= Yrjö Vesterinen =

Finnish motorcycle racer (born 1952)

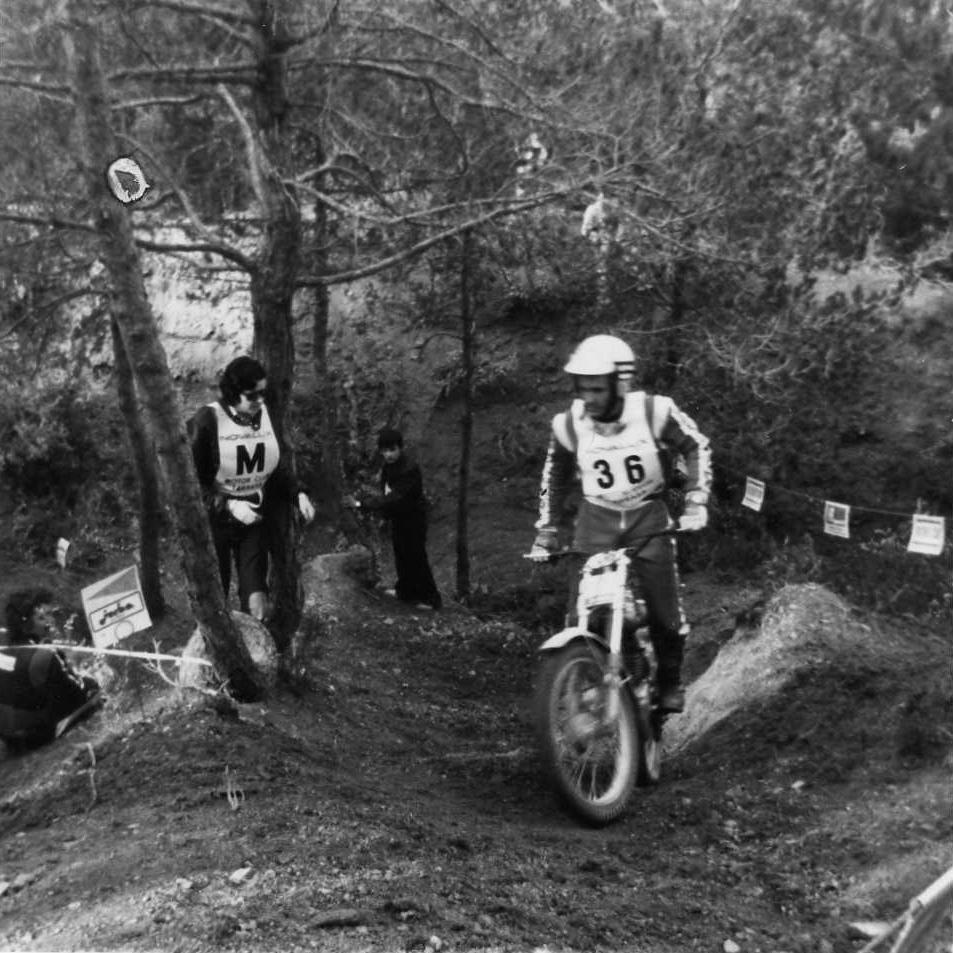
- Yrjö Vesterinen at the 1978 Trial Sant Lloreç
- Born: 7 December 1952 (age 73); Kokkola, Finland
- Occupation: Motorcycle trials rider

Championship titles
- FIM World Trials Champion (1976, 1977, 1978); Finnish National NATC Trials Champion (11 times 1970-1980); British National Trials Champion (1982)
Statistics
FIM Trial World Championship
Active years	1975-1983
Championships	3 (1976, 1977, 1978)
Team(s)	Bultaco, Montesa
Starts / Wins / Podiums / Points; 93 / 16 / 43 / 741
FIM European Trials Championship
Active years	1970-1974
Team(s)	Bultaco, Montesa
Best season (1974)	5th (62 pts)
Starts / Wins / Podiums / Points; 27 / 1 / 9 / 163

Yrjö Vesterinen (born 7 December 1952) is a Finnish former International motorcycle trials World Champion. Vesterinen won the FIM World Trials Championship three times from 1976 through 1978. He was also an 11-time Finnish National champion between 1970 and 1980, and British National champion in 1982.

== Biography ==
During 1970, Vesterinen won the Finnish National Trials championship and contested the FIM European Championships for the first time. He finished fourth in his home Finnish round and also scored a 10th place in Sweden, ending the season in 14th place.

Returning to the European championships in 1971, Vesterinen scored points at four rounds, his best being a third place podium finish in Finland behind Malcolm Rathmell and Mick Andrews, and a second in Sweden behind local rider Benny Sellman.

A switch to the Bultaco camp during the 1972 season saw Vesterinen retain his Finnish national title and take sixth in the European championship. Scoring a good fourth place in Finland and taking his first series win in Sweden.

Vesterinen slipped back to 7th in the standing for 1973, standing on the podium twice, with third place in Finland again behind Rathmell and Andrews, and third in Germany behind Martin Lampkin and Rob Edwards.

A best of second at the 1974 British round behind Rathmell but ahead of Andrews was to be the highlight of the season, with podiums in the US, Germany and Czechoslovakia helping him to 5th overall.

1975 was the first year of the re-titled FIM World Trials Championships. Vesterinen finished second to Martin Lampkin at the third round in Spain, and by round eight when he won the Canadian round realized he was in with a chance of winning the championship. He finished second to Malcolm Rathmell at the following US round then took a welcome victory at his home Finnish round, closing in on championship leader Lampkin. A pair of wins in Switzerland and Germany closed the gap even further, but a fourth place at the final round in Czechoslovakia, with Lampkin in second handed the title to Lampkin by one point.

Not wanting the same outcome for the 1976 season, Vesterinen started out the season with a win at the opening Irish round. During the season he finished second to Rathmell in France, second to Mick Andrews in Italy and second to Ulf Karlson in Sweden, along with wins in Germany and Finland to take the title ahead of the British pair of Rathmell and Lampkin.

Vesterinen retained his FIM World title in 1977, scoring in all twelve rounds and taking wins in Spain and Czechoslovakia among his six podium finishes, becoming the first multiple trials world champion.

1978 was a season long battle between Vesterinen and Lampkin, with Vesterinen taking the title by a mere two points after twelve rounds. He took four wins during the season to Lampkin's three.

Although Vesterinen once again scored well during all rounds of the 1979 world championship, his podiums and win in Belgium were not quite enough to hold off determined American Bernie Schreiber who took four wins throughout the season and managed to edge out Vesterinen for the title.

Riding a Montesa for the 1980 season, Vesterinen again battled reigning champion Schreiber the whole season, taking a win at the German round. But it was Swede Ulf Karlson who became World Champion at season's end with Schreiber second and Vesterinen third. The Finn did make history during the 1980 season by becoming the first foreign winner of the Scottish Six-Day trial.

Switching back to Bultaco, Vesterinen was again third in 1981, taking a consolation win in Finland, and also retaining his national title.

1982 was the year Vesterinen started slipping down the ranks as new riders started working their way to the top. He finished tenth in the World championship which was won by young Belgian Honda rider Eddy Lejeune.

In 1983, having relocated to the UK, Vesterinen only contested the British, Irish and Finnish rounds. He was suffering from a reoccurring back injury that meant it sometimes took weeks to recover from riding an event and he decided it was time to retire from high-profile competition and start a trials based business with his wife Diane.

Vesterinen still competes in the occasional vintage trials events such as the Pre-65 Scottish and the Red Rose Classic.

== FIM European Trials Championship Career ==
Year	Machine	Class	1	2	3	4	5	6	7	8	9	10	11	12	13	Points	Rank
1970	Montesa	FIM European	GER -	FRA -	GBR -	BEL -	IRL -	SPA -	FIN; 4	SWE; 10	POL -					9	14th
1971	Montesa	FIM European	GER; 7	GBR -	BEL; 9	IRL -	FRA -	SPA -	SWI -	FIN; 3	SWE; 2					28	7th
1972	Bultaco	FIM European	BEL; 9	IRL -	FRA -	SPA -	GBR -	GER -	ITA -	FIN; 4	SWE; 1	SWI -				25	6th
1973	Bultaco	FIM European	IRL -	BEL; 5	SPA -	FRA -	POL; 4	ITA -	FIN; 3	SWE; 6	SWI -	GER; 3				39	7th
1974	Bultaco	FIM European	USA; 3	IRL; 4	BEL; 5	SPA; 6	GBR; 2	FRA; 6	ITA; 7	POL; 5	GER; 3	FIN; 5	SWE; 7	CZE; 3	SWI; 9	62	5th

== World Trials Championship Career ==
Year	Machine	Class	1	2	3	4	5	6	7	8	9	10	11	12	13	14	Points	Rank
1975	Bultaco	FIM World	IRL; 5	BEL; 5	SPA; 2	GBR; 5	FRA; 4	POL; 4	ITA; 4	CAN; 1	USA; 2	FIN; 1	SWE; 4	SWI; 1	GER; 1	CZE; 4	100	2nd
1976	Bultaco	FIM World	IRL; 1	BEL; 6	SPA; 5	GBR -	FRA; 2	GER; 1	ITA; 2	USA; 2	SWE; 2	FIN; 1	SWI; 2	CZE; 3			93	1st
1977	Bultaco	FIM World	IRL; 4	GBR; 6	BEL; 3	SPA; 1	FRA; 3	GER; 5	USA; 10	CAN; 2	SWE; 4	FIN; 2	CZE; 1	SWI; 6			107	1st
1978	Bultaco	FIM World	IRL; 1	GBR; 1	BEL; 3	FRA; 3	SPA; 6	GER; 8	USA; 2	ITA; 5	AUT; 1	FIN; 2	SWE; 1	CZE; 3			128	1st
1979	Bultaco	FIM World	IRL; 5	GBR; 2	BEL; 1	NED; 2	SPA; 4	FRA; 4	CAN; 4	USA; 6	ITA; 6	SWE; 4	FIN; 3	CZE; 4			105	2nd
1980	Montesa	FIM World	IRL; 3	GBR; 6	BEL; 3	SPA; 3	AUT; 6	FRA; 3	SWI -	GER; 1	ITA; 4	FIN; 6	SWE; 4	CZE; 4			94	3rd
1981	Bultaco	FIM World	SPA; 8	BEL; 3	IRL; 6	GBR; 7	FRA; 8	ITA; 6	AUT; 3	USA; 3	FIN; 1	SWE; 10	CZE; 3	GER; 3			86	3rd
1982	Bultaco	FIM World	SPA -	BEL; 8	GBR; 6	ITA; 8	FRA -	GER -	AUT -	CAN; 7	USA; 8	FIN; 6	SWE -	POL -			23	10th
1983	Bultaco	FIM World	SPA -	BEL -	GBR; 10	IRL; 8	USA -	FRA -	AUT -	ITA -	SWI -	FIN; 10	SWE -	GER -			5	17th

== Honors ==
- FIM World Trials Champion 1976, 1977, 1978
- Finnish National NATC Trials Champion 1970, 1971, 1972, 1973, 1974, 1975, 1976, 1977, 1978, 1979, 1980
- British National Trials Champion 1982

== Related Reading ==
- NATC Trials Championship
- FIM Trial European Championship
- FIM Trial World Championship
- Trial des Nations
