= 1980 FIM World Motorcycle Trials season =

Newtownards, Ireland

1980 FIM World motorcycle trials season

Seasons
- ← 1979 1981 →

The 1980 World trials season consisted of twelve trials events. It began on 9 February, with round one in Newtownards, Ireland and ended with round twelve in Ricany, Czechoslovakia on 14 September.

== Season summary ==
Ulf Karlson would claim his first World trials championship in 1980, the first World Championship for Montesa.

== 1980 World trials season calendar ==
Round	Date	Trial	Venue	Trial GP
1	9 February	(Republic of Ireland) Ireland	Newtownards	1) Ulf Karlson; 2) Rob Shepherd; 3) Yrjo Vesterinen
2	16 February	(United Kingdom) Great Britain	Bovey Tracy	1) Mick Andrews; 2) Ulf Karlson; 3) Malcolm Rathmell
3	24 February	Belgium	Bilstain	1) Eddy Lejeune; 2) Martin Lampkin; 3) Yrjo Vesterinen
4	9 March	Spain	Olot	1) Bernie Schreiber; 2) Ulf Karlson; 3) Yrjo Vesterinen
5	20 April	Austria	Heinrich Am Weitra	1) Eddy Lejeune; 2) Ulf Karlson; 3) Martin Lampkin
6	1 June	France	St.Christophe	1) Bernie Schreiber; 2) Manuel Soler; 3) Yrjo Vesterinen
7	23 June	Switzerland	Fully	1) Eddy Lejeune; 2) Ulf Karlson; 3) Christian Desnoyers
8	30 June	Germany	Kiefersfelden	1) Yrjo Vesterinen; 2) Martin Lampkin; 3) Ulf Karlson
9	13 July	Italy	Chiesa in Valmalenco	1) Bernie Schreiber; 2) Martin Lampkin; 3) Ulf Karlson
10	24 August	Finland	Tervakovski	1) Bernie Schreiber; 2) Ulf Karlson; 3) Manuel Soler
11	31 August	Sweden	Karlskoga	1) Bernie Schreiber; 2) Ulf Karlson; 3) Eddy Lejeune
12	14 September	(Czech Republic) Czechoslovakia	Ricany	1) Bernie Schreiber; 2) Jaime Subira; 3) Antonio Gorgot

=== Scoring system ===
Points were awarded to the top ten finishers. All twelve rounds counted for the World Trials class.

Position	1st	2nd	3rd	4th	5th	6th	7th	8th	9th	10th
Points	15	12	10	8	6	5	4	3	2	1

=== World Trials final standings ===
Pos	Rider	Machine	IRL (Republic of Ireland)	GBR (United Kingdom)	BEL (Belgium)	SPA (Spain)	FRA (Austria)	GER (France)	USA (Switzerland)	CAN (Germany)	SWE (Italy)	FIN (Finland)	CZE (Sweden)	SWI (Czech Republic)	Pts	Notes
1	(Sweden) Ulf Karlson	Montesa	1	2	4	2	2	10	2	3	3	2	2	6	121	
2	(United States) Bernie Schreiber	Bultaco	4	8	5	1	7	1	-	-	1	1	1	1	111	
3	(Finland) Yrjo Vesterinen	Montesa	3	6	3	3	6	3	-	1	4	6	4	4	94	1980 Finnish Champion
4	(Belgium) Eddy Lejeune	HRC Honda	-	10	1	8	1	4	1	6	7	7	3	5	86	1980 Belgian Champion
5	(United Kingdom) Martin Lampkin	Bultaco	5	-	2	-	3	-	6	2	2	-	7	-	61	1980 British Champion
6	(Spain) Manuel Soler	Bultaco	9	4	7	5	8	2	-	-	-	3	9	-	47	
7	(Spain) Antonio Gorgot	Bultaco	-	-	-	4	4	-	-	8	-	5	5	3	41	1980 Spanish Champion
8	(United Kingdom) Malcolm Rathmell	Montesa	6	3	8	7	5	-	5	5	-	-	-	-	40	
9	(United Kingdom) Rob Shepherd	HRC Honda	2	5	-	10	9	-	4	-	5	-	-	7	39	
10	(Spain) Jaime Subira	Fantic	-	9	-	6	-	9	9	10	6	-	-	2	29	
11	(Belgium) Gilles Burgat	SWM	-	-	-	-	-	5	8	7	-	-	6	-	18	1980 French Champion
12	(United Kingdom) Mick Andrews	Yamaha	-	1	-	-	-	-	-	-	-	-	-	-	15	
13	(France) Christian Desnoyers	SWM	-	-	-	-	-	7	3	-	-	-	-	-	14	
14	(France) Charles Coutard	SWM / Montesa	8	-	-	9	-	6	-	9	10	-	-	-	13	
15	(Austria) Joe Wallman	Bultaco	-	-	-	-	-	-	10	4	-	-	-	-	9	
16	(Italy) Danilo Galeazzi	SWM	-	-	-	-	-	-	7	-	9	9	10	-	9	1980 Italian Champion
17	(Spain) Alberto Juvanteny	Ossa	-	-	-	-	-	-	-	-	-	4	-	-	8	
18	(Belgium) Jean Marie Lejeune	Montesa	-	-	6	-	-	-	-	-	-	-	-	-	5	
19	(United Kingdom) John Reynolds	Suzuki	-	7	-	-	-	-	-	-	-	-	-	-	4	
19	(United Kingdom) Chris Myers	Bultaco	7	-	-	-	-	-	-	-	-	-	-	-	4	
21	(Finland) Timo Ryysy	Bultaco	-	-	-	-	-	-	-	-	-	10	8		4	
22	(Belgium) Jean-Luc Colson	Montesa	-	-	-	-	-	-	-	-	-	-	-	8	3	
22	(Italy) Ettore Baldini	Bultaco	-	-	-	-	-	-	-	-	-	8	-	-	3	
22	(Italy) Fulvio Adamoli	Montesa	-	-	-	-	-	-	-	-	8	-	-	-	3	
22	(France) Fred Michaud	Ossa	-	-	-	-	-	8	-	-	-	-	-	-	3	
26	(Japan) Kiyoteru Hattori	HRC Honda	-	-	-	-	-	-	-	-	-	-	-	9	2	
26	(Belgium) Claude Goset	SWM	-	-	9	-	-	-	-	-	-	-	-	-	2	
28	(Spain) Xavier Miguel	Fantic	-	-	-	-	-	-	-	-	-	-	-	10	1	
28	(Spain) Pedro Olle	Montesa	-	-	-	-	10	-	-	-	-	-	-	-	1	
28	(United Kingdom) Nigel Birkett	Montesa	10	-	-	-	-	-	-	-	-	-	-	-	1	
