= 1978 FIM World Motorcycle Trials season =

1978 FIM World motorcycle trials season

Seasons
- ← 1977 1979 →

The 1978 World trials season consisted of twelve trials events. It began on 11 February, with round one in Newtownards, Ireland and ended with round twelve in Říčany, Czechoslovakia on 24 September.

== Season summary ==
Yrjo Vesterinen would claim his third World trials championship in 1978, repeating his 1976 and 1977 titles.

== 1978 World trials season calendar ==
Round	Date	Trial	Venue	Trial GP
1	11 February	(Republic of Ireland) Ireland	Newtownards	1) Yrjo Vesterinen; 2) Martin Lampkin; 3) Rob Shepherd
2	18 February	(United Kingdom) Great Britain	Rhayader	1) Yrjo Vesterinen; 2) Ulf Karlson; 3) Mick Andrews
3	26 February	Belgium	Bilstain	1) Martin Lampkin; 2) Rob Shepherd; 3) Yrjo Vesterinen
4	5 March	France	Sommieres	1) Bernie Schreiber; 2) Martin Lampkin; 3) Yrjo Vesterinen
5	12 March	Spain	Matadepera	1) Bernie Schreiber; 2) Martin Lampkin; 3) Mick Andrews
6	28 May	Germany	Gefrees	1) Martin Lampkin; 2) Bernie Schreiber; 3) Ulf Karlson
7	11 June	United States	Roaring Branch	1) Bernie Schreiber; 2) Yrjo Vesterinen; 3) Ulf Karlson
8	16 July	Italy	Pinerolo	1) Bernie Schreiber; 2) Martin Lampkin; 3) Antonio Gorgot
9	23 July	Austria	Spital Am Semmering	1) Yrjo Vesterinen; 2) Bernie Schreiber; 3) Ulf Karlson
10	20 August	Sweden	Molndal	1) Ulf Karlson; 2) Yrjo Vesterinen; 3) Bernie Schreiber
11	27 August	Finland	Ekenas	1) Yrjo Vesterinen; 2) Ulf Karlson; 3) Timo Ryysy
12	24 September	(Czech Republic) Czechoslovakia	Říčany	1) Martin Lampkin; 2) Bernie Schreiber; 3)Yrjo Vesterinen

=== Scoring system ===
Points were awarded to the top ten finishers. All twelve rounds counted for the World Trials class.

Position	1st	2nd	3rd	4th	5th	6th	7th	8th	9th	10th
Points	15	12	10	8	6	5	4	3	2	1

=== World Trials final standings ===
Pos	Rider	Machine	IRL (Republic of Ireland)	GBR (United Kingdom)	BEL (Belgium)	FRA (France)	SPA (Spain)	GER (Germany)	USA (United States)	ITA (Italy)	AUT (Austria)	SWE (Sweden)	FIN (Finland)	CZE (Czech Republic)	Pts	Notes
1	(Finland) Yrjo Vesterinen	Bultaco	1	1	3	3	6	8	2	5	1	2	1	3	128	1978 Finnish champion
2	(United Kingdom) Martin Lampkin	Bultaco	2	4	1	2	2	1	4	2	6	7	4	1	126	1978 British champion
3	(United States) Bernie Schreiber	Bultaco	9	8	-	1	1	2	1	1	2	3	6	2	116	1978 US NATC Champion
4	(Sweden) Ulf Karlson	Montesa	6	2	6	5	4	3	3	6	3	1	2	5	104	1978 Swedish Champion
5	(United Kingdom) Rob Shepherd	HRC Honda	3	-	2	6	5	4	-	-	5	6	5	6	63	
6	(United Kingdom) Mick Andrews	Yamaha / Ossa	4	3	7	7	3	6	8	-	-	-	-	-	44	
7	(Spain) Antonio Gorgot	Bultaco	-	-	-	8	9	7	9	3	-	-	-	4	29	1978 Spanish Champion
8	(Belgium) Jean Marie LeJeune	Montesa	8	-	4	-	-	5	-	-	4	-	-	-	25	1978 Belgian champion
9	(Spain) Jaime Subira	Montesa	-	-	-	4	-	-	-	7	-	4	10	7	25	
10	(Spain) Manuel Soler	Bultaco	-	-	-	-	-	-	-	4	7	5	7	-	22	
11	(Finland) Timo Ryysy	SWM	-	-	-	-	-	9	-	-	9	8	3	10	18	
12	(France) Charles Coutard	SWM	5	-	-	-	10	-	10	-	8	10	9	-	14	
13	(Austria) Joe Wallman	Bultaco	7	9	-	-	-	-	-	10	-	9	8	-	12	
14	(United Kingdom) Malcolm Rathmell	Suzuki	10	10	8	9	-	-	7	-	-	-	-	-	11	
15	(Belgium) Jean-Luc Colson	Montesa	-	-	5	-	7	-	-	-	-	-	-	-	10	
16	(United States) Marland Whaley	Montesa	-	-	-	-	-	-	5	8	10	-	-	-	10	
17	(United Kingdom) Nigel Birkett	Montesa	-	-	9	-	8	-	-	9	-	-	-	8	10	
18	(United Kingdom) John Reynolds	Suzuki	-	5	-	-	-	-	-	-	-	-	-	-	6	
19	(United States) Curt Comer	Montesa	-	-	-	-	-	-	6	-	-	-	-	-	5	
19	(United Kingdom) Rob Edwards	Montesa	-	6	-	-	-	-	-	-	-	-	-	-	5	
21	(France) Christian Desnoyers	Montesa	-	7	-	-	-	-	-	-	-	-	-	-	4	1978 French Champion
22	(Italy) Ettore Baldini	Bultaco	-	-	-	-	-	-	-	-	-	-	-	9	2	
23	(Germany) Felix Krahnstover	KTM	-	-	-	-	-	10	-	-	-	-	-	-	1	1978 German Champion
23	(Spain) Joaquim Abad	Ossa	-	-	-	10	-	-	-	-	-	-	-	-	1	
23	(Belgium) Claude Goset	Montesa	-	-	10	-	-	-	-	-	-	-	-	-	1	
