= 1977 FIM World Motorcycle Trials season =

1977 FIM World motorcycle trials season

Seasons
- ← 1976 1978 →

The 1977 World trials season consisted of twelve trials events. It began on 12 February, with round one in Newtownards, Ireland and ended with round twelve in Oberiberg, Switzerland on 25 September.

== Season summary ==
Yrjo Vesterinen would claim his second World trials championship in 1977, repeating his 1976 title.

== 1977 World trials season calendar ==
| Round | Date | Trial | Venue | Trial GP |
|---|---|---|---|---|
| 1 | 12 February | (Republic of Ireland) Ireland | Newtownards | 1) Malcolm Rathmell; 2) John Reynolds; 3) Rob Edwards |
| 2 | 19 February | (United Kingdom) Great Britain | Rhayader | 1) Malcolm Rathmell; 2) Manuel Soler; 3) Dave Thorpe |
| 3 | 27 February | Belgium | Bilstain | 1) Malcolm Rathmell; 2) Ulf Karlson; 3) Yrjo Vesterinen |
| 4 | 6 March | Spain | Matadepera | 1) Yrjo Vesterinen; 2) Martin Lampkin; 3) Bernie Schreiber |
| 5 | 13 March | France | Sancerre | 1) Ulf Karlson; 2) Martin Lampkin; 3) Yrjo Vesterinen |
| 6 | 20 March | Germany | Bielefeld | 1) Martin Lampkin; 2) Bernie Schreiber; 3) Rob Shepherd |
| 7 | 29 May | United States | Port Huron | 1) Charles Coutard; 2) Marland Whaley; 3) Mike Griffitts |
| 8 | 5 June | Canada | Chicoutimi | 1) Charles Coutard; 2) Yrjo Vesterinen; 3) Malcolm Rathmell |
| 9 | 28 August | Sweden | Huddingen | 1) Ulf Karlson; 2) Bo Nilsson; 3) Malcolm Rathmell |
| 10 | 4 September | Finland | Ekenas | 1) Rob Shepherd; 2) Yrjo Vesterinen; 3) Martin Lampkin |
| 11 | 18 September | (Czech Republic) Czechoslovakia | Ricany | 1) Yrjo Vesterinen; 2) Rob Shepherd; 3) Martin Lampkin |
| 12 | 25 September | Switzerland | Oberiberg | 1) Ulf Karlson; 2) Malcolm Rathmell; 3) Rob Shepherd |

=== Scoring system ===
Points were awarded to the top ten finishers. All twelve rounds counted for the World Trials class.

| Position | 1st | 2nd | 3rd | 4th | 5th | 6th | 7th | 8th | 9th | 10th |
|---|---|---|---|---|---|---|---|---|---|---|
| Points | 15 | 12 | 10 | 8 | 6 | 5 | 4 | 3 | 2 | 1 |

=== World Trials final standings ===
| Pos | Rider | Machine | IRL (Republic of Ireland) | GBR (United Kingdom) | BEL (Belgium) | SPA (Spain) | FRA (France) | GER (Germany) | USA (United States) | CAN (Canada) | SWE (Sweden) | FIN (Finland) | CZE (Czech Republic) | SWI (Switzerland) | Pts | Notes |
|---|---|---|---|---|---|---|---|---|---|---|---|---|---|---|---|---|
| 1 | (Finland) Yrjo Vesterinen | Bultaco | 4 | 6 | 3 | 1 | 3 | 5 | 10 | 2 | 4 | 2 | 1 | 6 | 107 | 1977 Finnish champion |
| 2 | (Sweden) Ulf Karlson | Montesa | 5 | 8 | 2 | 4 | 1 | 6 | 8 | 6 | 1 | 5 | 4 | 1 | 101 | 1977 Swedish champion |
| 3 | (United Kingdom) Malcolm Rathmell | Montesa | 1 | 1 | 1 | 7 | - | 4 | 9 | 3 | 3 | 8 | 5 | 2 | 100 | |
| 4 | (United Kingdom) Martin Lampkin | Bultaco | 9 | 5 | 8 | 2 | 2 | 1 | 4 | 4 | 5 | 3 | 3 | 5 | 98 | winner of 1977 Scottish 6 day & scott trials |
| 5 | (United Kingdom) Rob Shepherd | HRC Honda | 8 | - | 4 | 8 | 9 | 3 | - | - | 6 | 1 | 2 | 3 | 68 | 1977 British champion |
| 6 | (France) Charles Coutard | Bultaco | 6 | 9 | - | 5 | 4 | - | 1 | 1 | 7 | 4 | - | - | 63 | 1977 French champion |
| 7 | (United States) Bernie Schreiber | Bultaco | - | - | 5 | 3 | 5 | 2 | - | 7 | 8 | 6 | 8 | 7 | 53 | |
| 8 | (Spain) Manuel Soler | Bultaco | - | 2 | - | 6 | 8 | 8 | - | 9 | - | - | 6 | - | 30 | 1977 Spanish champion |
| 9 | (United Kingdom) Nigel Birkett | Montesa | 7 | - | 6 | 9 | 7 | 7 | - | 8 | 10 | - | 10 | 9 | 26 | |
| 10 | (United States) Marland Whaley | HRC Honda | - | - | - | - | - | - | 2 | - | - | - | - | 4 | 20 | 1977 US NATC champion |
| 11 | (United Kingdom) John Reynolds | Suzuki | 2 | 4 | - | - | - | - | - | - | - | - | - | - | 20 | |
| 12 | (Belgium) Jean Marie LeJeune | Montesa | - | 7 | 7 | - | 6 | 9 | - | 10 | - | - | - | 8 | 19 | 1977 Belgian champion |
| 13 | (United Kingdom) Mick Andrews | Yamaha | - | 10 | 10 | - | - | 10 | - | - | 9 | 7 | 7 | - | 13 | |
| 14 | (Sweden) Bo Nilsson | Ossa | - | - | - | - | - | - | - | - | 2 | - | - | - | 12 | |
| 15 | (United States) Don Sweet | Montesa | - | - | - | - | - | - | 6 | 5 | - | - | - | - | 11 | |
| 16 | (United States) Mike Griffitts | Montesa | - | - | - | - | - | - | 3 | - | - | - | - | - | 10 | |
| 16 | (United Kingdom) Dave Thorpe | Bultaco | - | 3 | - | - | - | - | - | - | - | - | - | - | 10 | |
| 16 | (United Kingdom) Rob Edwards | Montesa | 3 | - | - | - | - | - | - | - | - | - | - | - | 10 | |
| 19 | (United States) Mark Eggar | Honda | - | - | - | - | - | - | 5 | - | - | - | - | - | 6 | |
| 20 | (United States) Lane Leavitt | Bultaco | - | - | - | - | - | - | 7 | - | - | - | - | - | 4 | |
| 21 | (Belgium) Jean-Luc Colson | Montesa | - | - | 9 | - | - | - | - | - | - | - | 9 | - | 4 | |
| 22 | (Finland) Timo Ryysy | Bultaco | - | - | - | - | - | - | - | - | - | 9 | - | - | 2 | |
| 23 | (Sweden) Tore Evertsson | Bultaco | - | - | - | 10 | 10 | - | - | - | - | - | - | - | 2 | |
| 24 | (Italy) Fulvio Adamoli | Montesa | - | - | - | - | - | - | - | - | - | - | - | 10 | 1 | |
| 24 | (Spain) Jaime Subira | Montesa | - | - | - | - | - | - | - | - | - | 10 | - | - | 1 | |
| 24 | (United Kingdom) Alan Lampkin | Bultaco | 10 | - | - | - | - | - | - | - | - | - | - | - | 1 | |
