= 1979 FIM World Motorcycle Trials season =

1979 FIM World motorcycle trials season

Seasons
- ← 1978 1980 →

The 1979 World trials season consisted of twelve trials events. It began on 10 February, with round one in Newtownards, Ireland and ended with round twelve in Ricany, Czechoslovakia on 16 September.

== Season summary ==
Bernie Schreiber would claim his first World trials championship in 1979, the first American to win the FIM World Trials Championship.

== 1979 World trials season calendar ==
Round	Date	Trial	Venue	Trial GP
1	10 February	(Republic of Ireland) Ireland	Newtownards	1) Rob Shepherd; 2) John Reynolds; 3) Martin Lampkin
2	17 February	(United Kingdom) Great Britain	Rhayader	1) Malcolm Rathmell; 2) Yrjo Vesterinen; 3) Martin Lampkin
3	25 February	Belgium	Bilstain	1) Yrjo Vesterinen; 2) Martin Lampkin; 3) Malcolm Rathmell
4	4 March	Netherlands	Norg	1) Ulf Karlson; 2) Yrjo Vesterinen; 3) Nigel Birkett
5	11 March	Spain	Matadepera	1) Bernie Schreiber; 2) Jaime Subira; 3) Marlan Whaley
6	18 March	France	Montbelliard	1) Ulf Karlson; 2) Bernie Schreiber; 3) Charles Coutard
7	10 June	Canada	Calgary	1) Malcolm Rathmell; 2) Martin Lampkin; 3) Bernie Schreiber
8	17 June	United States	Pueblo	1) Bernie Schreiber; 2) Rob Shepherd; 3) Martin Lampkin
9	15 July	Italy	Mezzo Lago	1) Charles Coutard; 2) Bernie Schreiber; 3) Rob Shepherd
10	19 August	Sweden	Boras	1) Bernie Schreiber; 2) Ulf Karlson; 3) Antonio Gorgot
11	26 August	Finland	Espoo	1) Manuel Soler; 2) Ulf Karlson; 3) Yrjo Vesterinen
12	16 September	(Czech Republic) Czechoslovakia	Ricany	1) Bernie Schreiber; 2) Ulf Karlson; 3) Martin Lampkin

=== Scoring system ===
Points were awarded to the top ten finishers. All twelve rounds counted for the World Trials class.

Position	1st	2nd	3rd	4th	5th	6th	7th	8th	9th	10th
Points	15	12	10	8	6	5	4	3	2	1

=== World Trials final standings ===
Pos	Rider	Machine	IRL (Republic of Ireland)	GBR (United Kingdom)	BEL (Belgium)	NED (Netherlands)	SPA (Spain)	FRA (France)	CAN (Canada)	USA (United States)	ITA (Italy)	SWE (Sweden)	FIN (Finland)	CZE (Czech Republic)	Pts	Notes
1	(United States) Bernie Schreiber	Bultaco	-	7	6	4	1	2	3	1	2	1	7	1	115	first American to win a trials world championship
2	(Finland) Yrjo Vesterinen	Bultaco	5	2	1	2	4	4	4	6	6	4	3	4	105	1979 Finnish champion
3	(Sweden) Ulf Karlson	Montesa	9	-	9	1	6	1	7	5	4	2	2	2	93	1979 Swedish Champion
4	(United Kingdom) Martin Lampkin	Bultaco	3	3	2	6	5	5	2	3	-	5	-	3	87	
5	(United Kingdom) Malcolm Rathmell	Montesa	4	1	3	7	-	7	1	4	8	9	4	-	77	1979 British champion
6	(United Kingdom) Rob Shepherd	HRC Honda	1	-	8	-	7	6	6	2	3	8	9	-	59	
7	(France) Charles Coutard	SWM	-	5	4	9	-	3	9	10	1	-	-	10	45	1979 French Champion
8	(Spain) Manuel Soler	Bultaco	10	-	-	-	9	-	-	-	5	7	1	9	30	
9	(United States) Marland Whaley	Montesa	-	-	10	-	3	9	5	8	9	-	-	-	24	1979 US NATC Champion
10	(Belgium) Jean-Marie Lejeune	Montesa	8	9	5	5	-	-	8	7	-	-	-	-	24	
11	(Spain) Jaime Subira	Montesa	-	8	-	-	2	-	-	-	10	-	10	6	22	
12	(United Kingdom) Nigel Birkett	Montesa	7	4	-	3	-	-	-	-	-	-	-	-	22	
13	(Spain) Antonio Gorgot	Bultaco	6	10	-	-	-	-	-	-	-	3	6	-	21	1979 Spanish Champion
14	(United Kingdom) John Reynolds	Suzuki	2	-	-	-	-	-	-	-	-	-	-	-	12	
15	(Belgium) Eddy Lejeune	HRC Honda	-	-	-	-	-	-	10	9	-	6	-	7	12	
16	(United Kingdom) Mick Andrews	Ossa	-	-	7	-	-	8	-	-	-	10	-	8	11	
17	(Finland) Timo Ryysy	SWM	-	-	-	10	-	-	-	-	-	-	5	-	7	
18	(Belgium) Jean-Luc Colson	Montesa	-	-	-	-	-	-	-	-	-	-	-	5	6	1979 Belgian Champ
19	(Austria) Joe Wallman	Bultaco	-	6	-	-	-	-	-	-	-	-	-	-	5	
20	(Italy) Danilo Galeazzi	SWM	-	-	-	-	-	-	-	-	7	-	-	-	4	
21	(Finland) Anttoni Vesterinen	Bultaco	-	-	-	-	-	-	-	-	-	-	8		3	
21	(Spain) Jo Jose	Bultaco	-	-	-	-	8	-	-	-	-	-	-	-	3	
21	(Belgium) Claude Goset	Montesa	-	-	-	8	-	-	-	-	-	-	-	-	3	
24	(Italy) Ettore Baldini	Bultaco	-	-	-	-	-	10	-	-	-	-	-	-	1	1979 Italian Champion
24	(Germany) Felix Krahnstover	Montesa	-	-	-	-	10	-	-	-	-	-	-	-	1	1979 German Champion
