= Malcolm Rathmell =

English motorcycle rider (born 1949)

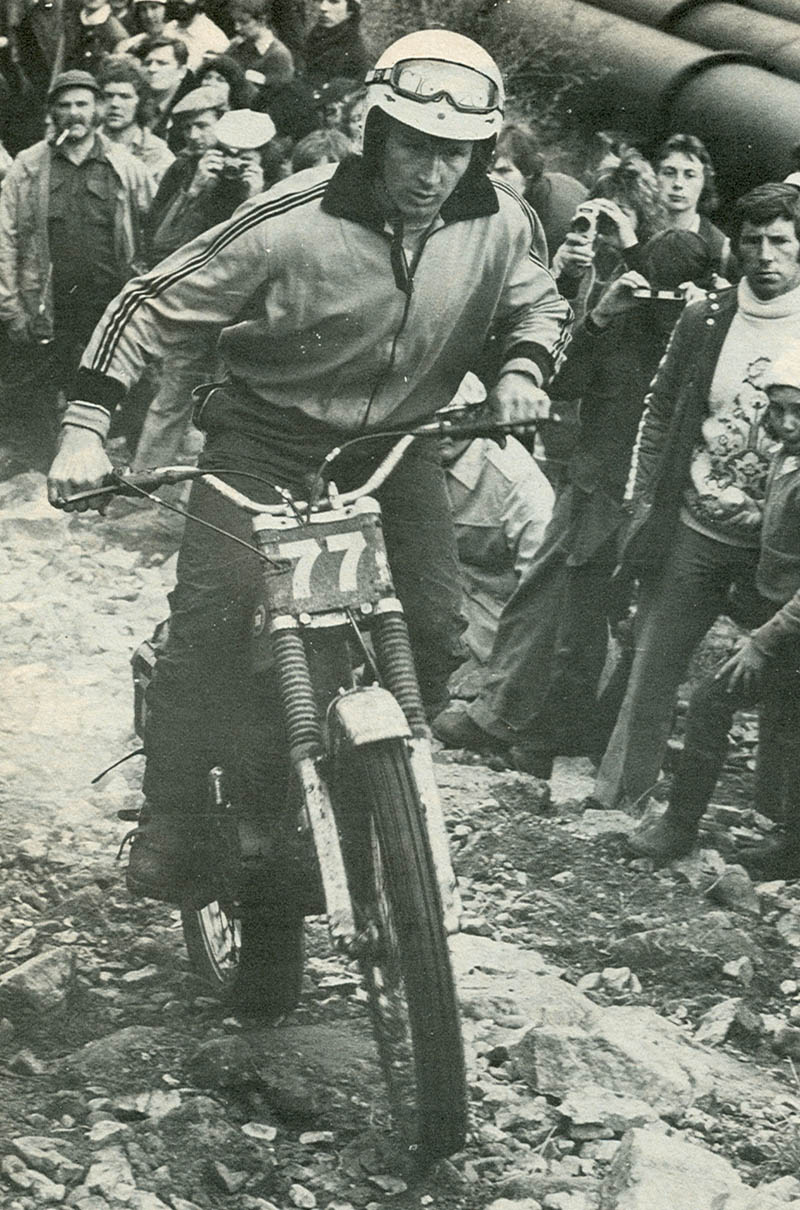
- Nationality: British
- Born: 18 June 1949 (age 77); Otley, West Yorkshire, England
- Current team: Retired
- Website: http://www.mrsltd.co.uk

Malcolm Rathmell (born 18 June 1949), is an English former international motorcycle trials rider. He won the Scottish Six Days Trial in 1973 and 1979, and clinched the FIM Trans America Trials Championship in 1974 (The series was to become FIM Trial World Championship in 1975). Rathmell is a six-time winner of the British Trials Championship between 1971 and 1981 and six-time winner of the Scott Trial between 1971 and 1980. In 2013, Rathmell was named an FIM Legend for his motorcycling achievements.

== Biography ==
Born in Otley, West Yorkshire, England, Rathmell first contested the FIM European Championship in 1970 before finishing runner up to Mick Andrews in the 1971 championship,McManus, Peter, ed. (2013). Derbyshire Motorcycle Maestros. MEP Publishers. pp. 167–177. ISBN 978-0-9542912-7-3. a year in which he also won the Scott Trial for the first time. Though rarely off the podium in 1972 the championship was a repeat to the previous season, followed by a 3rd-place finish on the factory supported Bultaco for 1973. In 1974 Rathmell almost switched camps from Bultaco to Ossa but found himself facing legal action from Bultaco for breach of contract.Whyte, Norrie, ed. (1974). MCN Annual 1975. Patrick Stephens Limited. pp. 13–19. ISBN 0-85059-182-1. Sticking with Bultaco for 1974 worked out for Rathmell as he won the FIM Trans America Trials Championship. He did however switch to Montesa for the 1975 season for the first year of the FIM Trial World Championship and added world round wins in Belgium, Poland and the United States and finish 3rd in the championship. A Runner up position to Bultaco rider Yrjo Vestarinen in 1976 and a 3rd place in 1977 were to be Rathmell's best attempts at recapturing the title on the Montesa.Ward, Frank, ed. (1977). MCN Yearbook 1976/77. Patrick Stephens Limited. pp. 45–48. ISBN 0-85059-244-5. For 1978 a Suzuki ride could only yield a 14th-place finish after which Rathmell rounded out his international career back with Montesa through the 1982 season.Morrison, Ian, ed. (1991). Guinness Motorcycle Fact Book. Guinness Publishing. pp. 161–164. ISBN 0-85112-953-6. Malcolm Rathmell Sports Limited opened in the UK in 1991 as an Aprilia importer and is currently the sole UK distributor for many off-road products.

== British Trials Championship career ==
Year	Team	1	2	3	4	5	6	7	8	9	10	Points	Rank
1970	Bultaco	STD -	VIC; 5	LOM -	TRA -	SSD; 6	BEM -	WEL; 5	SCO -	PER -	KNU -	20	11th
1971	Bultaco	VIC; 1	COL; 2	KIC; 9	CLE; 5	SSD; 3	AJE; 8	DUL -	RED; 2	SCO; 1	HOA; 2	76	2nd
1977	Montesa	COT; 6	STD; 7	CLE; 3	WYE; 2	LOM; 1	ALA; 3	WOE; 1	TRA; 2	WEL; 3	HOA; 4	101	3rd
1978	Suzuki	VIC; 2	KIC; 4	COT; 2	ALL; 6	PRE; 1	DIC; 7	SCO; 2	PER; 1	PEA; 2		95	3rd
1979	Montesa	COL; 1	EAS; 2	COT; 1	VIC; 2	LYN; 2	ALA; 2	WOE; 1	JOH; 1	HOA; 3	PEA; 5	124	1st
1980	Montesa	STD; 2	COL; 3	CLE; 2	LOM; 3	MIT; 1	ALL -	RED; 2	TRA; 4	PRE; 1	WEL; 2	106	2nd

== European Trials Championship career ==
Year	Team	1	2	3	4	5	6	7	8	9	10	11	12	13	Points	Rank
1970	Greeves / Bultaco	GER -	FRA -	GBR; 2	BEL -	IRL; 2	SPA; 6	FIN -	SWE -	POL -					29	5th
1971	Bultaco	GER -	GBR; 4	BEL; 2	IRL; 2	FRA; 3	SPA; 3	SUI -	FIN; 1	SWE; 6					59	2nd
1972	Bultaco	BEL; 2	IRL; 2	FRA; 1	SPA; 5	GBR -	GER; 2	ITA; 3	FIN; 2	SWE; 3	SUI -				73	2nd
1973	Bultaco	IRL; 6	BEL; 1	SPA; 6	FRA; 8	POL; 2	ITA; 10	FIN; 1	SWE; 10	SUI; 10	GER; 5				58	3rd
1974	Bultaco	USA; 2	IRL; 7	BEL; 2	SPA; 2	GBR; 1	FRA; 10	ITA; 1	POL; 2	GER; 2	FIN; 2	SWE; 3	CZE; 7	SUI; 1	93	1st

== World Trials Championship career ==
Year	Team	1	2	3	4	5	6	7	8	9	10	11	12	13	14	Points	Rank
1975	Montesa	IRL; 8	BEL; 1	SPA; 3	GBR; 2	FRA; 2	POL; 1	ITA; 3	CAN; 4	USA; 1	FIN; 5	SWE; 8	SUI; 3	GER; 6	CZE; 3	99	3rd
1976	Montesa	IRL; 5	BEL; 1	SPA; 4	GBR; 1	FRA; 1	GER -	ITA; 4	USA; 3	SWE; 6	FIN; 2	SUI; 5	CZE; 2			87	2nd
1977	Montesa	IRL; 1	GBR; 1	BEL; 1	SPA; 7	FRA -	GER; 4	USA; 9	CAN; 2	SWE; 2	FIN; 8	CZE; 5	SUI; 2			100	3rd
1978	Suzuki	IRL; 10	GBR; 10	BEL; 8	FRA; 9	SPA -	GER -	USA; 7	ITA -	AUT -	SWE -	FIN -	CZE -			11	14th
1979	Montesa	IRL; 4	GBR; 1	BEL; 3	NED; 7	SPA -	FRA; 7	CAN; 1	USA; 4	ITA; 8	SWE; 9	FIN; 4	CZE -			77	5th
1980	Montesa	IRL; 6	GBR; 3	BEL; 8	SPA; 7	AUT; 5	FRA -	SUI; 5	GER; 5	ITA -	FIN -	SWE -	CZE -			40	8th
1981	Montesa	SPA -	BEL; 6	IRL; 4	GBR; 3	FRA -	ITA; 9	AUT; 8	USA -	FIN -	SWE -	CZE -	GER -			28	11th
1982	Montesa	SPA -	BEL -	GBR; 9	ITA -	FRA -	GER -	AUT -	CAN -	USA -	FIN -	SWE -	POL -			2	23rd

== Honors ==
- Trans America Champion 1974 - (Was called World Championship from the following Year on)
- 6 Times British Trials Champion (1972,74,75,76,79,81)
- 6 Times Scott Trial Winner
- 2 Times SSDT winner
- F.I.M Legend Award (2013)

== Related reading ==
- FIM Trial World Championship
- Scott Trial
- Scottish Six Days Trial
