= Francesc Xavier Bultó =

Catalan motorcycle industrialist

- Francesc Xavier Bultó Marquès
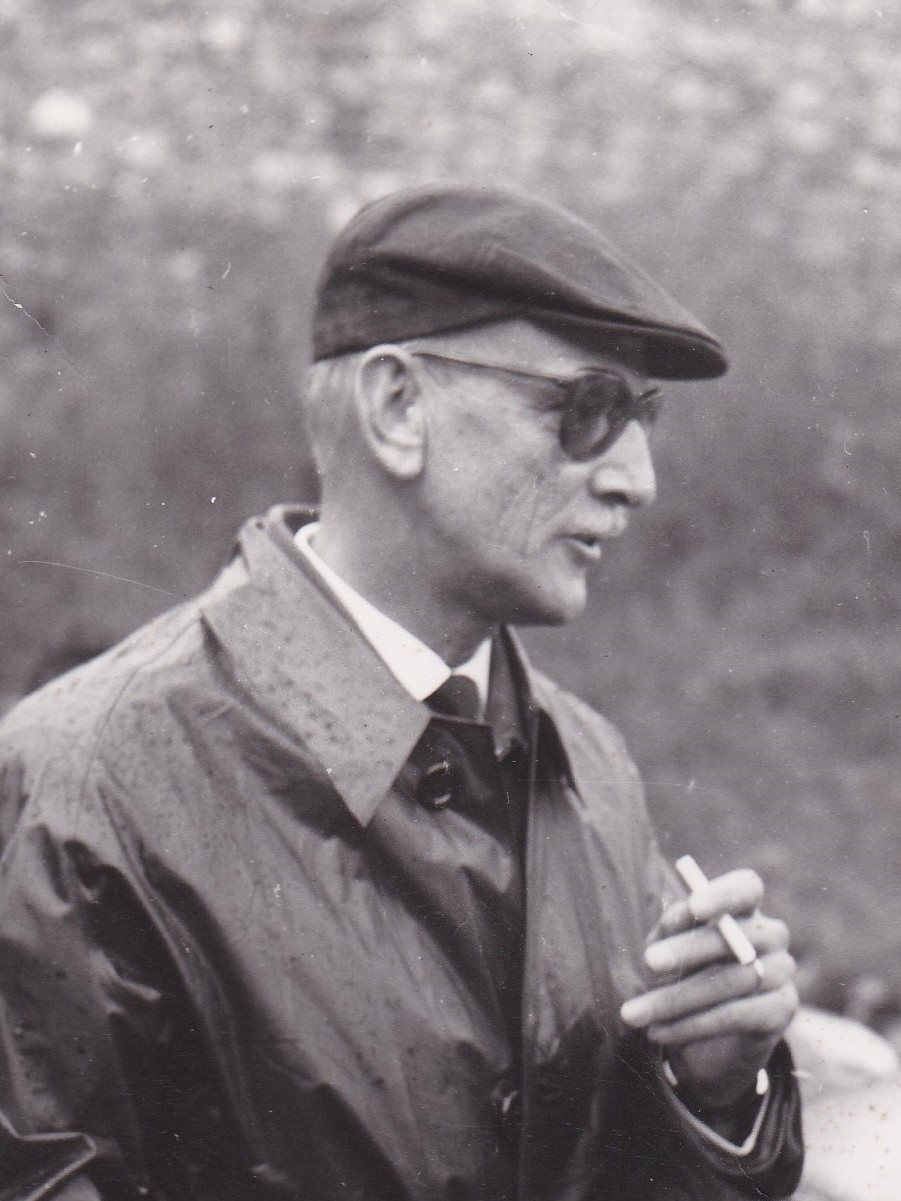
- Bulto in 1963
- Born: 17 May 1912; Barcelona
- Died: 3 August 1998 (aged 86)
- Occupation: Industrialist
- Known for: Motorbikes Montesa and Bultaco

Francesc Xavier Bultó Marquès (Barcelona, 17 May 1912 – Barcelona, 3 August 1998), popularly known as Paco Bultó, was a Spanish Catalan businessman, founder of Montesa along with Peter Permanyer, and of Bultaco. He was born into a family of Catalan bourgeoisie dedicated mainly to textiles. He is known as a motorcycle engineer and designer.

In the first company, Permanyer was the businessman and manager, and Bultó had experience with motorcycles. They produced light bikes with two-stroke engines, which outperformed heavier English bikes with four-stroke engines. In 1958, the Spanish government demanded some cuts from industry, and Permanyer wanted to abandon the sport-bike branch. Bultó coined his famous motto "the market follows the chequered flag" and left the company. Together with some former employees, he started his own venture called Bultaco. The first model, Bultaco Tralla 101, came to the market in 1959. The bikes were manufactured at the Bultó family farm, and his children acted as test drivers for all prototypes. Francisco Xavier Bultó died on 3 August 1998, at age 86.

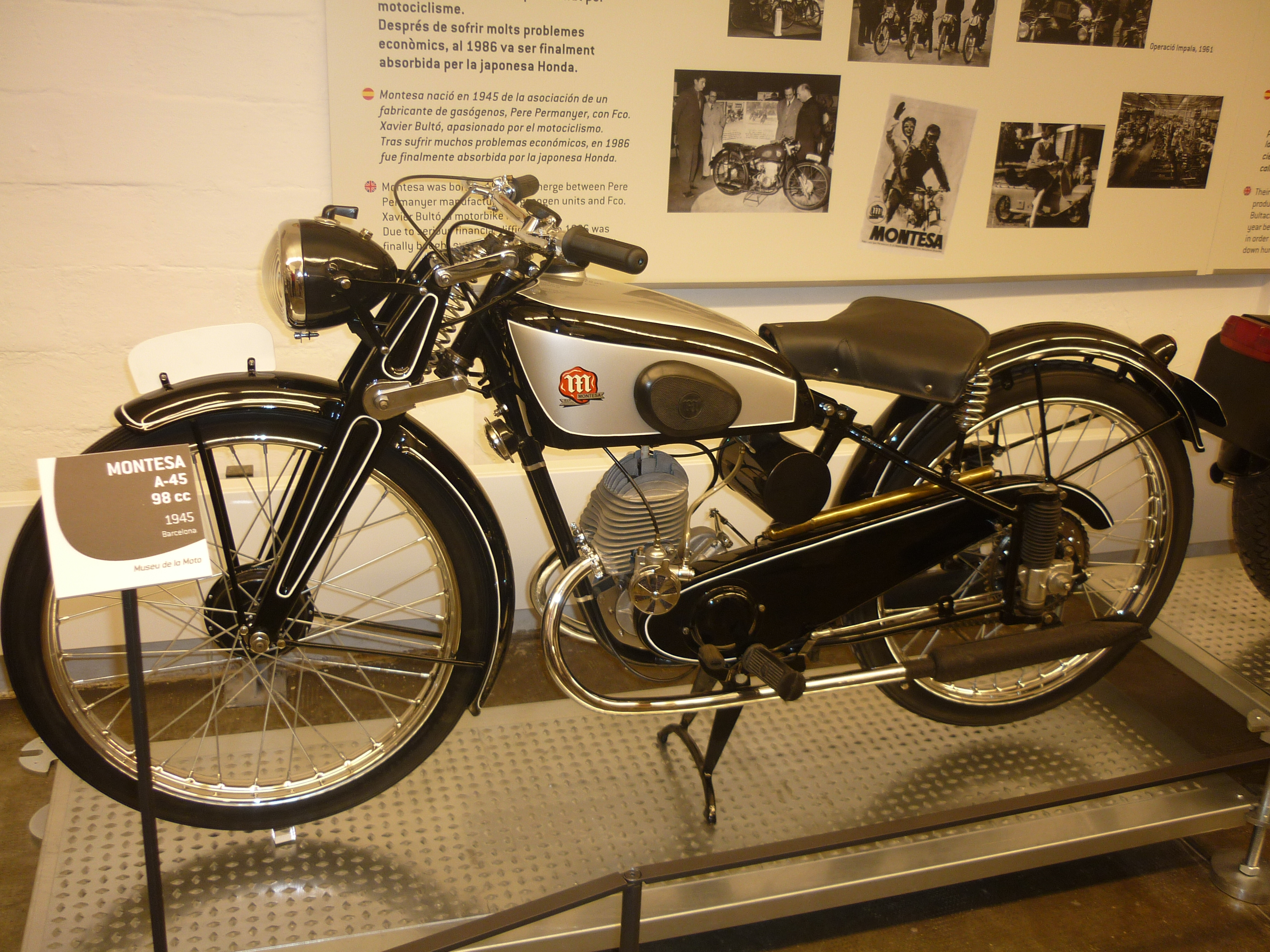
Montesa A-45 98 cc (1945)

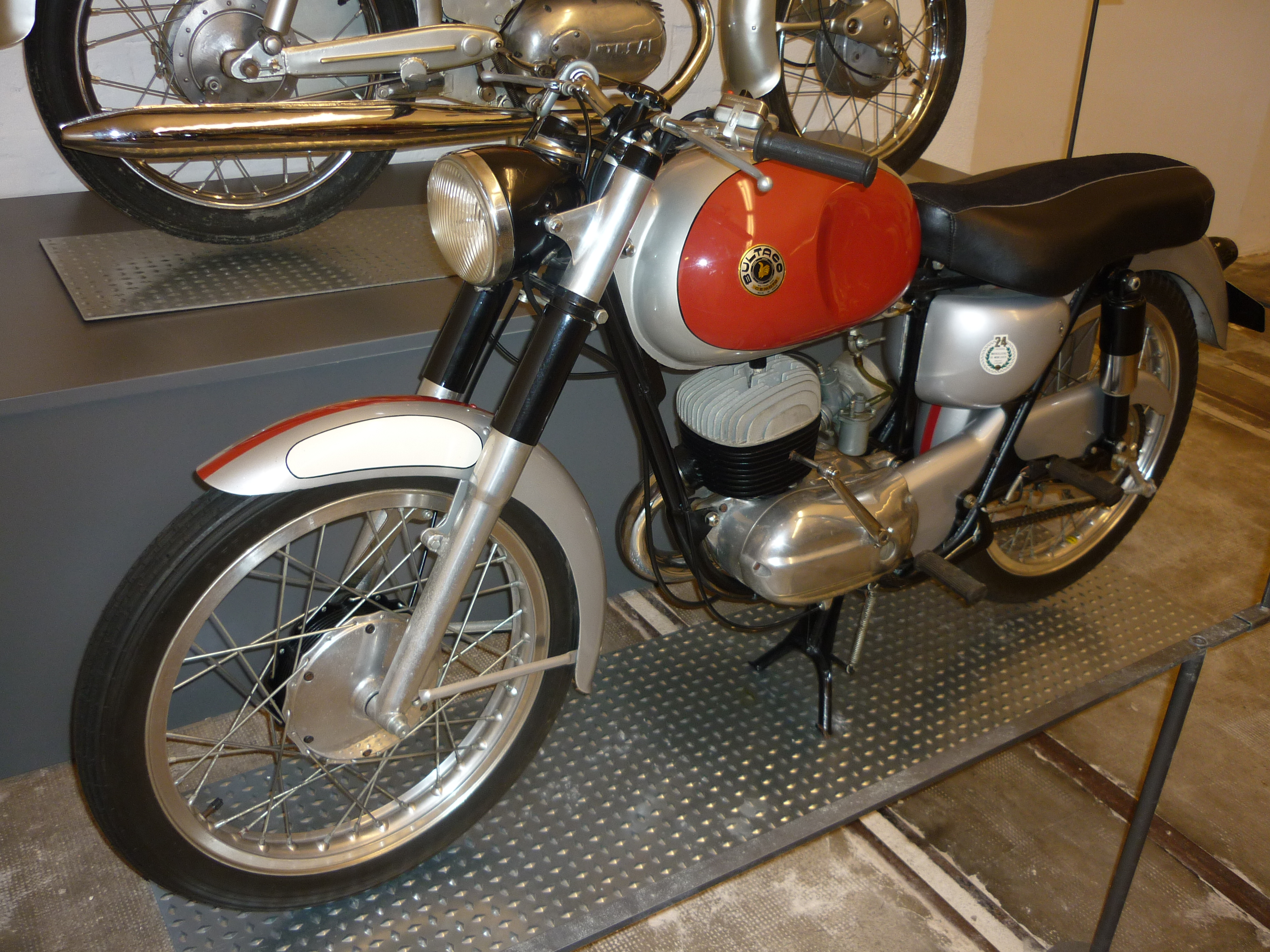
Bultaco Tralla 101 125 cc (1959)
