= Bernie Schreiber =

American motorcycle racer (born 1959)

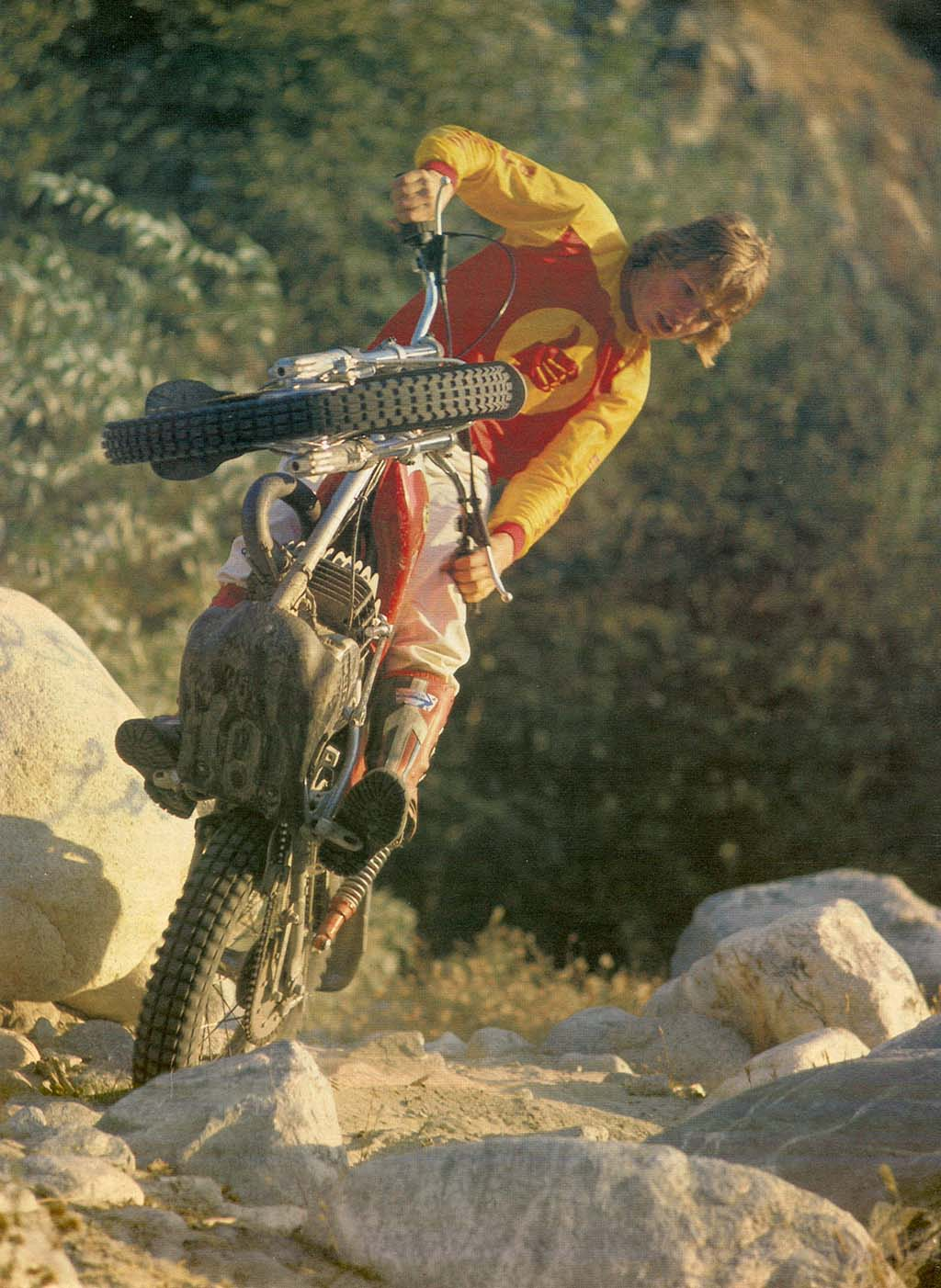
- Schreiber on a Bultaco Sherpa in 1976
- Nationality: (United States) American
- Born: January 20, 1959 (age 67); Los Angeles, California, United States
- Current team: Retired
- Website: https://www.bernieschreiber.com

Bernard Schreiber (born January 20, 1959), is an American former international motorcycle trials rider. He became the only American to win the FIM Trial World Championship in 1979. Schreiber is also four-time winner of the NATC Trials Championship, winning the title in 1978, 1982, 1983 and 1987. In 2000 he was inducted into the AMA Motorcycle Hall of Fame and, in 2020 he was named an FIM Legend.

== Biography ==
Born in Los Angeles, California, Schreiber started competing in trials at the age of 10 in 1969. Within a few years he had established himself as a top contender in Southern California and began competing in the FIM Trial World Championship in 1977 at 17 years of age. In 1978, he won the US national title and finished third in the World Trials Championship behind defending champion Yrjo Vesterinen and Martin Lampkin, racking up victories in France, Spain, the United States and Italy in the process.

Schreiber made history in 1979 when he became the first American to win the World Trials Championship. After a slow start to the season Schreiber put together four wins and three additional podiums out of the last eight rounds to take the title. A midseason switch from Bultaco to Italjet during 1980 helped Schreiber end the season on a high, winning the last four rounds, but not quite enough to retain the title finishing second behind Swede Ulf Karlsson.

A mixed season followed in 1981 and prompted a switch to SWM for 1982. Only missing the podium twice all 1982 saw him again runner up, this time to emerging Belgian talent Eddy Lejeune. 1982 also marked Schreiber's only victory at the prestigious Scottish Six Days Trial, coming from behind to overtake Lejeune on the last day of the competition. His good riding paid dividends in the US Nationals with Schreiber taking back-to-back national championship titles in 1982 and 1983. Schreiber and Lejeune battled for the world title over the next couple of years with Lejeune edging out the American both years. After returning to the US national championship, Schreiber took his fourth and final US title in 1987 riding a Fantic.

== National Trials Championship Career ==
Year	Class	Machine	Rd 1	Rd 2	Rd 3	Rd 4	Rd 5	Rd 6	Rd 7	Rd 8	Rd 9	Rd 10	Points	Pos	Notes
1980	(United Kingdom) British Championship	Bultaco	STD; 10	COL; 7	CLE -	LOM -	MIT -	ALL -	RED -	TRA -	PRE -	WEL -	5	17th	
1982	(United States) NATC Champ	SWM	FL -	CA; 1	MT; 1	MT; 1	RI; 1	MA; 1	NY -	TN -			75	1st	NATC US National Champion
1983	(United States) NATC Champ	SWM	TX; 1	TX; 1	TX; 1	CA -	AZ -	PN -	MI; 1	IL; 1			75	1st	NATC US National Champion

== International Trials Championship Career ==
Year	Class	Machine	Rd 1	Rd 2	Rd 3	Rd 4	Rd 5	Rd 6	Rd 7	Rd 8	Rd 9	Rd 10	Rd 11	Rd 12	Points	Pos	Notes
1977	FIM World Championship	Bultaco	IRL -	GBR -	BEL; 5	SPA; 3	FRA; 5	GER; 2	USA -	CAN; 7	SWE; 8	FIN; 6	CZE; 8	SUI; 7	53	7th	
1978	FIM World Championship	Bultaco	IRL; 9	GBR; 8	BEL -	FRA; 1	SPA; 1	GER; 2	USA; 1	ITA; 1	AUT; 2	SWE; 3	FIN; 6	CZE; 2	116	3rd	
1979	FIM World Championship	Bultaco	IRL -	GBR; 7	BEL; 6	NED; 4	SPA; 1	FRA; 2	CAN; 3	USA; 1	ITA; 2	SWE; 1	FIN; 7	CZE; 1	115	1st	FIM World Champion
1980	FIM World Championship	Bultaco / Italjet	IRL; 4	GBR; 8	BEL; 5	SPA; 1	AUT; 7	FRA; 1	SUI -	GER -	ITA; 1	FIN; 1	SWE; 1	CZE; 1	111	2nd	
1981	FIM World Championship	Italjet	SPA; 3	BEL; 8	IRL -	GBR -	FRA; 4	ITA; 3	AUT; 6	USA; 8	FIN; 5	SWE; 3	CZE; 2	GER -	66	6th	
1982	FIM World Championship	SWM	SPA; 2	BEL; 2	GBR; 1	ITA; 2	FRA; 3	GER; 2	AUT; 3	CAN; 1	USA; 3	FIN; 10	SWE; 4	POL; 3	127	2nd	
1983	FIM World Championship	SWM	SPA; 1	BEL; 4	GBR; 3	IRL; 2	USA; 6	FRA; 2	AUT; 2	ITA; 4	SUI; 3	FIN; 5	SWE; 1	GER; 3	123	2nd	
1984	FIM World Championship	SWM	SPA; 3	BEL; 8	GBR; 1	IRL; 4	FRA; 4	GER; 1	USA; 10	CAN; 6	AUT; 6	ITA; 5	FIN; 4	SWE; 4	152	3rd	
1986	FIM World Championship	Yamaha	BEL -	GBR; 8	IRL; 11	SPA; 8	FRA; 9	USA; 8	CAN; 12	GER; 9	AUT; 11	ITA; 12	SWE; 5	FIN; 8	75	7th	
1987	FIM World Championship	Fantic	SPA; 8	BEL -	GBR -	IRL -	GER -	FRA -	USA; 13	AUT -	ITA -	CZE -	SUI -	SWE -	11	20th	

== Honors ==
- US NATC Trials Champion 1978, 1982, 1983, 1987
- FIM Trials World Champion 1979
- Scottish Six Day Trial Winner 1982
- BBC Kick Start Champion 1982, 1983
