= Mick Andrews =

English international motorcycle trials rider

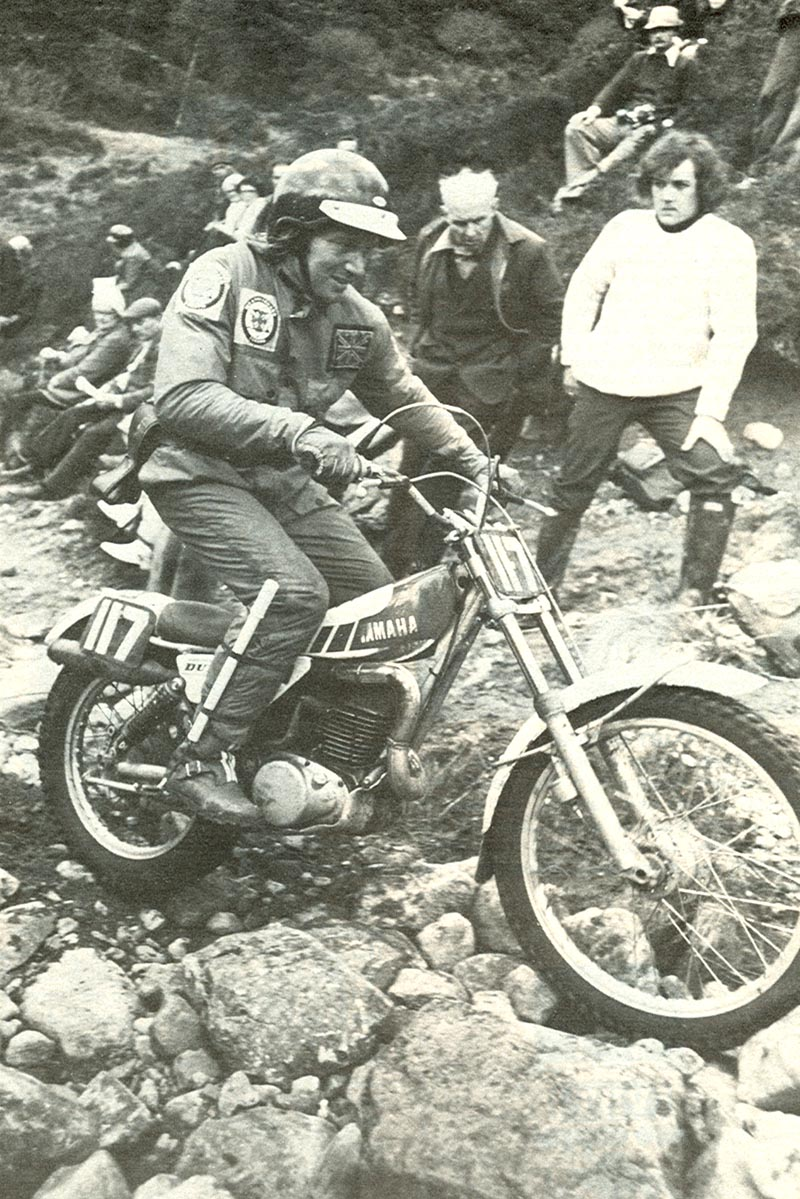
- Andrews on a Yamaha in 1975
- Nationality: British
- Born: 5 July 1944 (age 82); Buxton, Derbyshire, England
- Current team: Retired

Mick Andrews (born 5 July 1944), is an English former international motorcycle trials rider. He was FIM European Trials Champion in 1971 and 1972 (The series became FIM Trial World Championship in 1975) and is a five times winner of the Scottish Six Days Trial, taking the laurels in 1970, 1971, 1972, 1974 and 1975, equalling the record set by Sammy Miller. In 2015, Andrews was named an FIM Legend for his motorcycling achievements.

== Biography ==
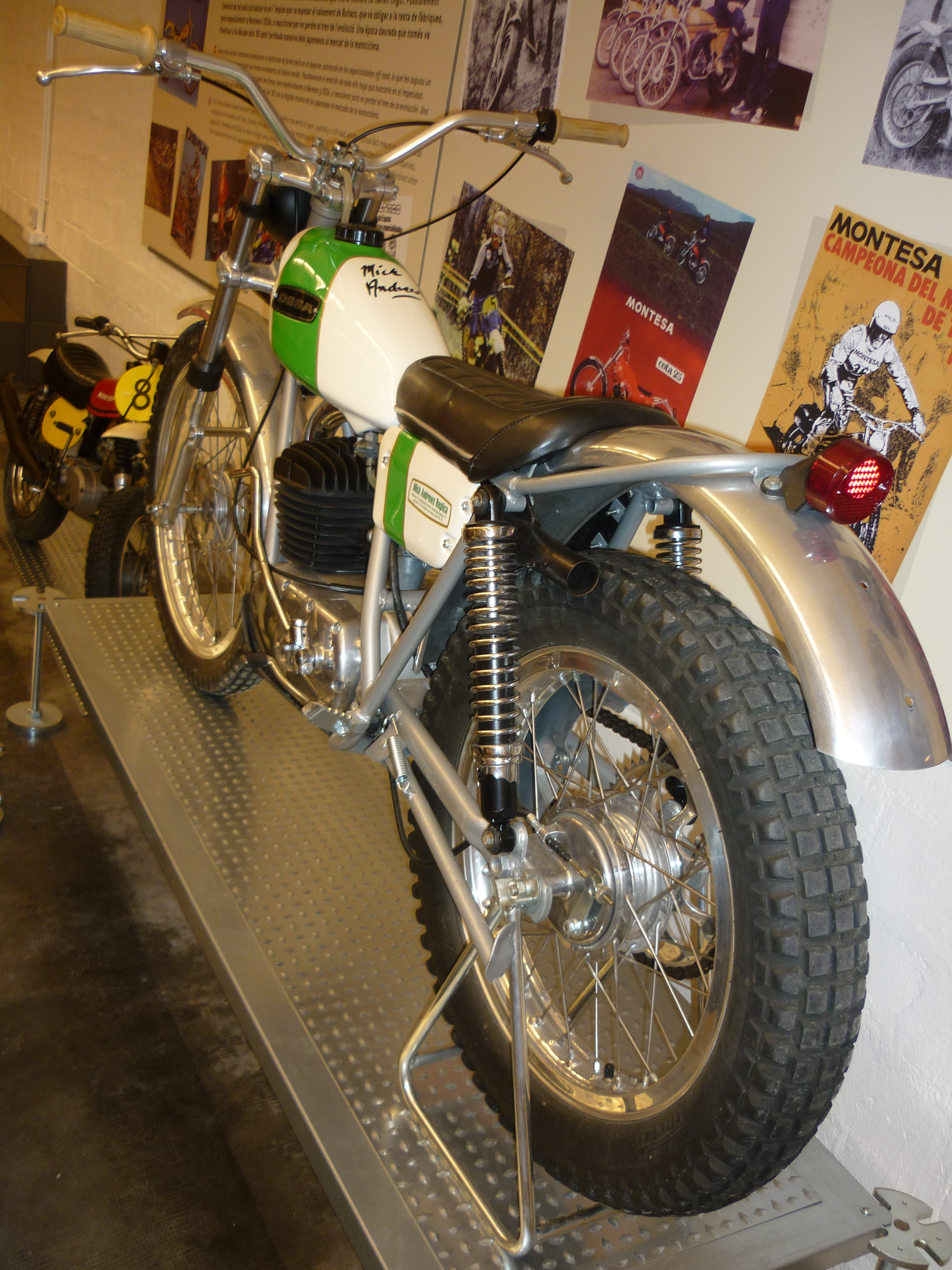
1972 Ossa Mick Andrews Replica

Born in Buxton, Derbyshire, Andrews began competing in trials events during 1959 at the age of 15 riding a 197cc James before moving up to a Matchless 350 the following year.

In 1961, Andrews' talent was spotted by AMC Competition Manager and former three time Scottish Six Day winner Hugh Viney, who offered him a factory-sponsored AJS ride. He competed on the AJS models until 1965 when the AMC company purchased the James and Francis-Barnett companies, switching their works riders to the more competitive 250cc James machines.

After AMC went out of business in 1966, Andrews picked up a ride with the Rickman brothers before gaining a factory-backed ride with the Ossa factory in 1967. He was to spend six years with Ossa, during which time Andrews won the Scottish Six Days Trial three years in a row and won the European Trials Championship twice, all on a bike designed and developed by himself. The Ossa MAR (Mick Andrews Replica) is a well known machine used in vintage competition the world over.

In 1973, he signed to ride and develop a bike for Yamaha. The bike was the TY250 and Andrews went on to add two more Scottish Six Days wins to his tally with victory in 1974 and 1975. During this time, he also designed the TY80 and TY175 models on which so many top riders had their first taste of trials riding. Andrews competed in the FIM Trial World Championship until 1980, and still rides in select events including the occasional visit the AHRMA Vintage days in the United States.

== British Trials Championship ==
Year	Team	1	2	3	4	5	6	7	8	9	10	Points	Rank
1970	Ossa	STD; 5	VIC; 10	LOM; 5	TRA; 3	SSD; 1	BEM -	WEL -	SCO -	PER; 7	KNU; 8	45	6th
1971	Ossa	VIC -	COL -	KIC -	CLE; 1	SSD; 1	AJE -	DUL -	RED -	SCO -	HOA -	30	8th
1977	Yamaha	COT; 9	STD; 5	CLE; 4	WYE; 4	LOM; 2	ALA -	WOE -	TRA; 4	WEL; 2	HOA; 3	67	4th
1978	Yamaha	VIC; 5	KIC; 7	COT; 9	ALL; 3	PRE; 8	DIC; 2	SCO; 4	PER; 6	PEA; 8		53	4th
1979	Ossa	COL -	EAS; 5	COT -	VIC -	LYN -	ALA -	WOE -	JOH -	HOA -	PEA -	6	14th
1980	Yamaha	STD -	COL -	CLE; 4	LOM; 6	MIT; 4	ALL; 9	RED -	TRA -	PRE -	WEL; 3	31	9th
1981	Yamaha	COL; 10	STD -	COS -	CLE -	MIT; 10	WAI; 10	ALL; 3	WOE; 6	RED; 1	WYE -	33	8th

== European Trials Championship ==
Year	Team	1	2	3	4	5	6	7	8	9	10	11	12	13	Points	Rank
1970	Ossa	GER -	FRA -	GBR -	BEL -	IRL -	SPA; 1	FIN -	SWE -	POL -					15	10th
1971	Ossa	GER; 1	GBR; 2	BEL; 1	IRL; 10	FRA; 1	SPA; 1	SUI; 1	FIN; 2	SWE -					75	1st
1972	Ossa	BEL; 1	IRL; 1	FRA; 2	SPA; 1	GBR; 1	GER; 1	ITA; 4	FIN; 3	SWE -	SUI -				87	1st
1973	Yamaha	IRL; 4	BEL; 6	SPA -	FRA; 1	POL; 5	ITA; 1	FIN; 2	SWE; 2	SUI; 4	GER -				70	2nd
1974	Yamaha	USA -	IRL; 2	BEL; 1	SPA; 7	GBR; 3	FRA; 1	ITA; 2	POL; 6	GER; 6	FIN; 6	SWE; 5	CZE; 4	SUI; 2	84	3rd

== World Trials Championship ==
Year	Team	1	2	3	4	5	6	7	8	9	10	11	12	13	14	Points	Rank
1975	Yamaha	IRL -	BEL; 8	SPA; 4	GBR; 10	FRA; 1	POL; 5	ITA; 2	CAN; 9	USA; 10	FIN; 4	SWE; 3	SUI; 5	GER; 4	CZE; 1	82	4th
1976	Yamaha	IRL; 7	BEL; 4	SPA; 7	GBR; 4	FRA -	GER -	ITA; 1	USA; 6	SWE; 3	FIN; 3	SUI; 3	CZE; 4			69	4th
1977	Yamaha	IRL -	GBR; 10	BEL; 10	SPA -	FRA -	GER; 10	USA -	CAN -	SWE; 9	FIN; 7	CZE; 7	SUI -			13	13th
1978	Yamaha / Ossa	IRL; 4	GBR; 3	BEL; 7	FRA; 7	SPA; 3	GER; 6	USA; 8	ITA -	AUT -	SWE -	FIN -	CZE -			44	6th
1979	Ossa	IRL -	GBR -	BEL; 7	NED -	SPA -	FRA; 8	CAN -	USA -	ITA -	SWE; 10	FIN -	CZE; 8			11	16th
1980	Ossa	IRL -	GBR; 1	BEL -	SPA -	AUT -	FRA -	SUI -	GER -	ITA -	FIN -	SWE -	CZE -			15	12th

== Honors ==
- FIM European Trials Champion 1971, 1972
- Scottish Six Day Trial Winner 1970, 1971, 1972, 1974, 1975
