= Martin Lampkin =

English motorcycle racer (1950–2016)

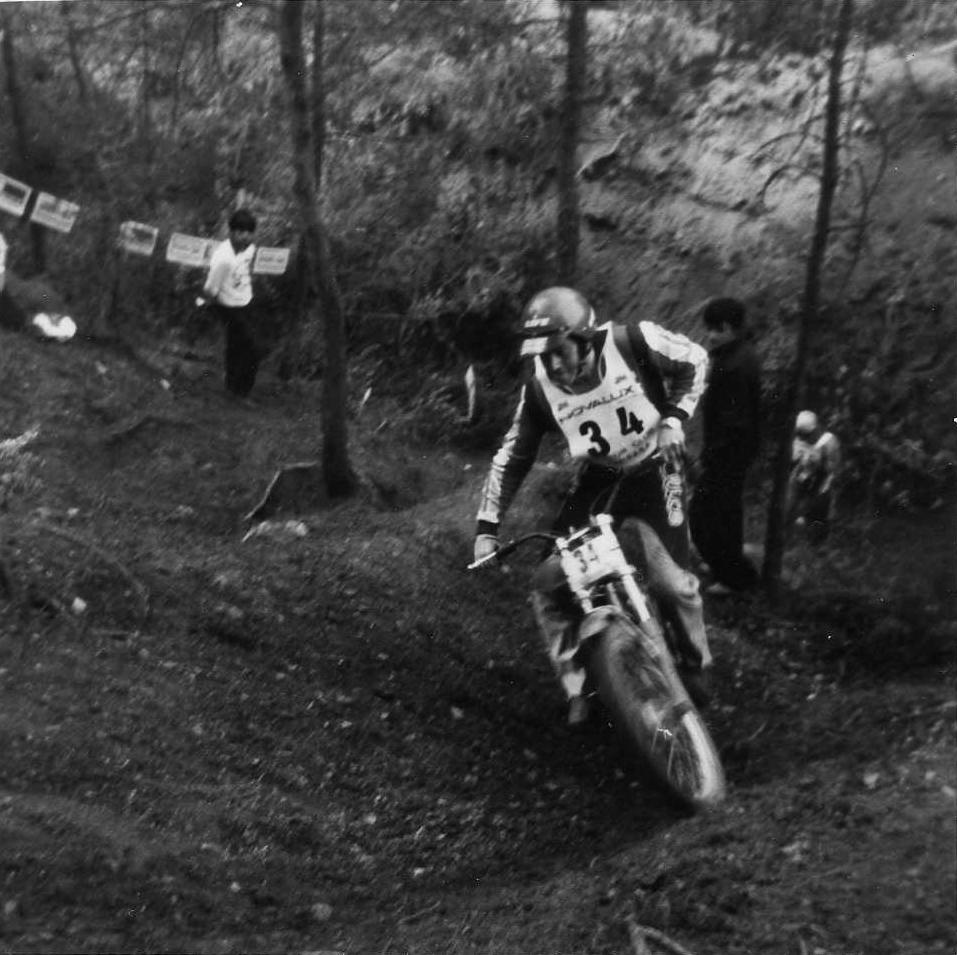
- Lampkin on a Bultaco Sherpa in 1978
- Nationality: British
- Born: 28 December 1950; Silsden, England
- Died: 2 April 2016 (aged 65)

Harold Martin Lampkin (28 December 1950 – 2 April 2016) was an English professional motorcycle competitor. He competed in a variety of off-road motorcycle events, but specialized in observed trials competitions, winning the inaugural FIM Trial World Championship held in 1975. In a genre of motorcycling competition that features balletic grace and acrobatic finesse, Lampkin was an iconoclast, using sheer momentum and physical strength to assault trials course sections. He died in 2016 of cancer.

== Motorcycling career ==
The third son in a Yorkshire motorcycling dynasty, Lampkin was raised in Silsden, where he began riding motorcycles at an early age. His older brothers Arthur and Alan Lampkin were successful motorcycle racers and became members of the BSA factory racing team in the 1960s. In the early 1970s, Lampkin established himself as one of the top competitors in motorcycle trials, gaining the attention of Francisco Bultó, the owner of the Bultaco motorcycle company. Bultó offered him a job as a member of the Bultaco factory trials team, and in 1973, he won the European trials championship as well as the British trials national championship. The European championship was considered to be the world championship at the time, as the sport of trials had yet to develop outside of Europe.

In 1975, the European championship was upgraded to world championship status and Lampkin claimed the title to become the first-ever trials world champion. He continued to experience success in the world championships until 1980, when the Bultaco factory began to experience financial troubles. Lampkin then joined the SWM factory team until he retired from professional competition in 1982. Besides his European and World Championship titles, Lampkin was also a four-time winner of the Scott Trial (1977, 1978, 1981, 1982), a three-time winner of the British trials national championship (1973, 1978, 1980) and won the grueling Scottish Six Days Trial three consecutive times (1976, 1977, 1978).

Lampkin is the father of twelve-time trials world champion, Dougie Lampkin. After retiring from competition, Lampkin supported his son as he embarked on a successful professional motorcycle trials career.
