= Montesa Honda =

Spanish subsidiary of Honda

Montesa Honda is a subsidiary business of Honda, which assembles several models of motorcycles and bicycles in Barcelona, Spain. It was formed in 1944 by Pere Permanyer and Francesc Xavier "Paco" Bultó. The business was Spanish-owned until entering into an association with Honda.

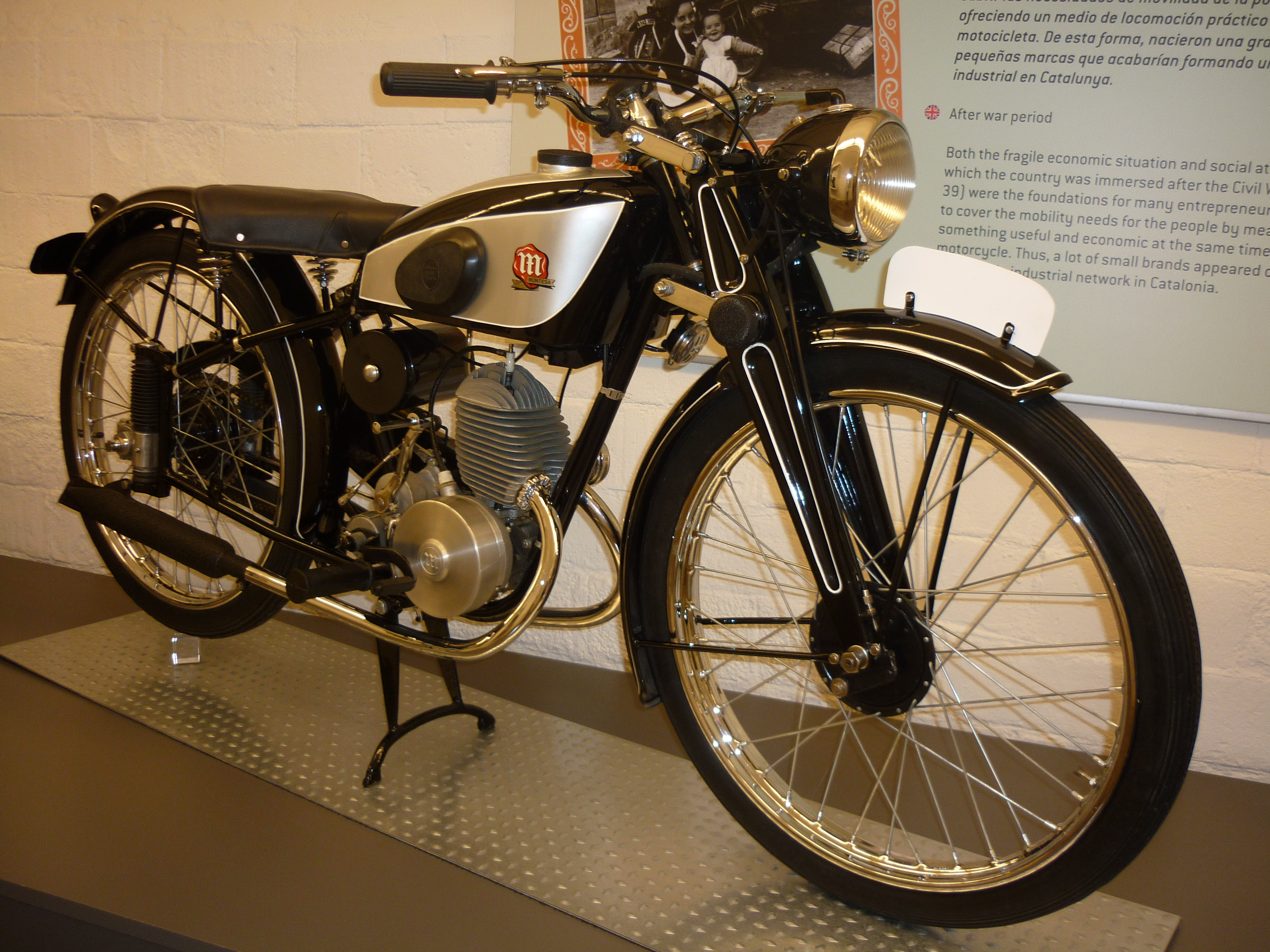
The first montesa ever, the A 45

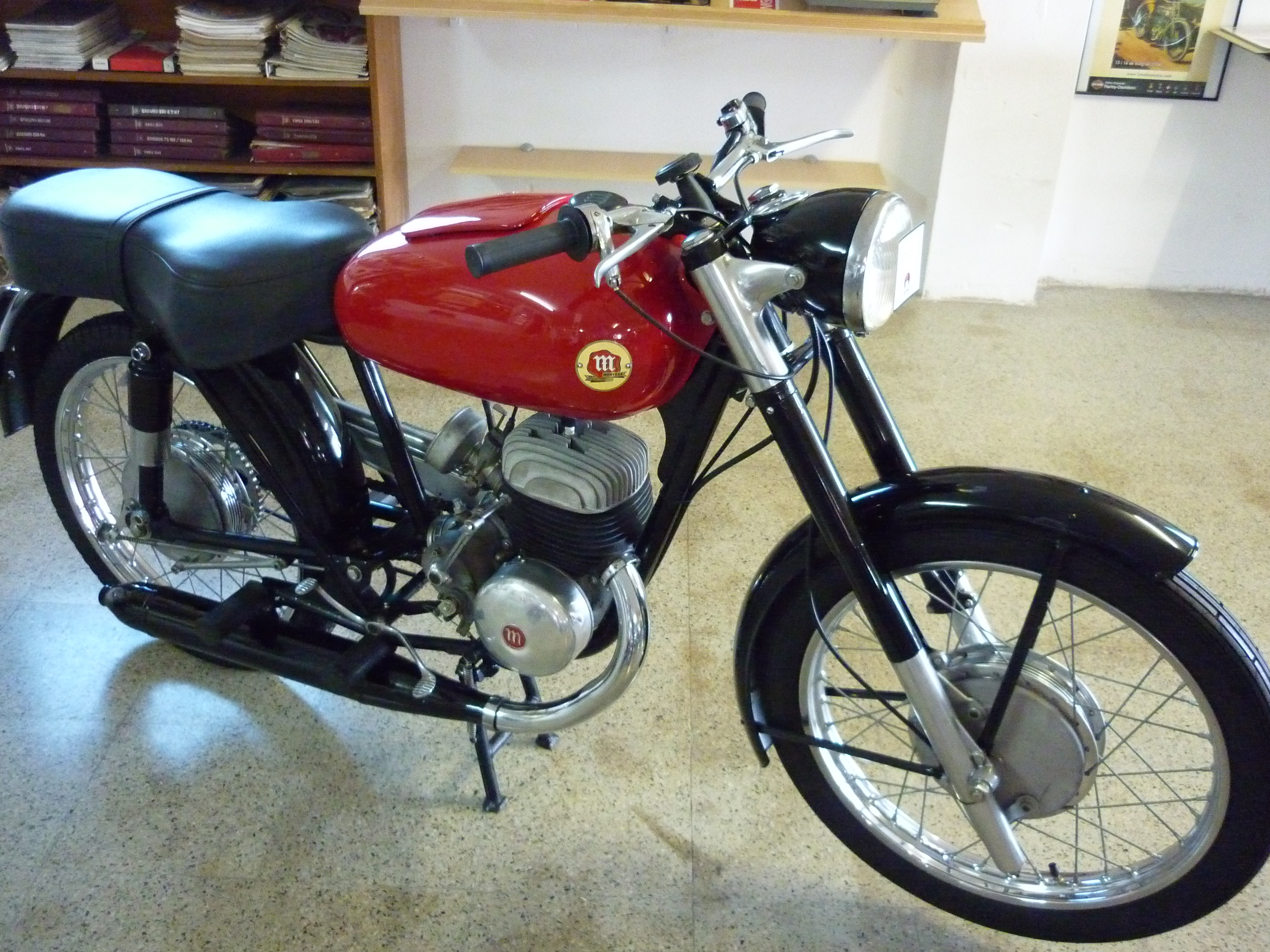
Brio 110 (125cc) 1959-62

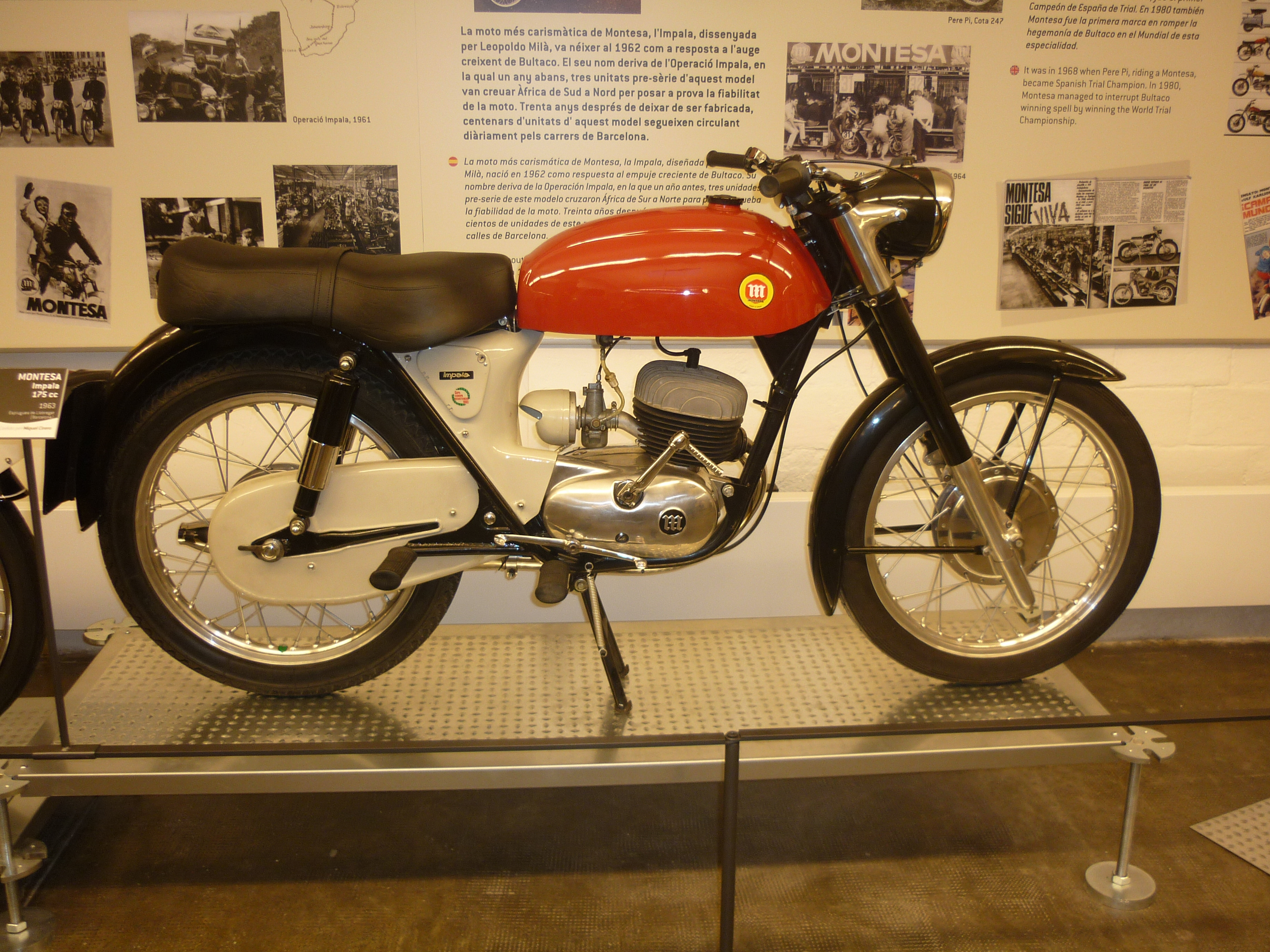
The Impala (1962-70)(175cc)

== Permanyer and Bultó ==
Their first Montesa prototype was based upon the French Motobécane models of that time. Permanyer began to produce his own gas engines, which allowed for a new area in motorcycles to be explored and expanded into. Permanyer and Bultó teamed up in Barcelona and created a light-weight motorcycle. This led to the creation of a bike powered by a 95cc two-stroke engine with no sprung rear suspension. Despite some setbacks, they sold 22 of these units in the first year of production. The next year, the partnership focused on production improvements and meeting the growing demand for their bike. As a successor to the previous model, Bultó designed a new 125cc roadster, which was tested in many of the trail-type rallies and semi-enduros that were popular in Spain at the time.

This model went on to enter the 1951 International Six Day Trials. The bike was entered by the factory, being ridden by Bultó and G. Cavestany. In the early 1950s, Montesa entered many races in the 125cc class of road racing. These bikes featured six-speed, bolt on gearboxes, in semi-unit construction, with all gears running on needle-roller bearings. By 1956, these Montesa 125s were very competitive and took second, third and fourth places in the Ultra-Lightweight race at the Isle of Man TT.

The most successful Montesa street bike of the 1950s was the Brio 80, of which more than 12,000 were produced. The success of the Brio and the other models, led to the opening of a new, larger factory in Espluges de Llobregat. The Brio 80 and Brio 90 models contained many new advances, such as moving the carburetor behind the cylinder, and a handbrake. However, a slump in the Spanish economy had forced Permanyer to cut back on the company's racing activities. Permanyer wanted to pull out of road racing, but Bultó insisted that they stay the course. In May 1958, chief designer Bultó left, taking with him several of Montesa's vital personnel to form a competitive firm, Bultaco. Permanyer had not only lost the brilliant designer Bultó, but also his 30% share of the company.

== Growth and success in the 1960s and 1970s ==
Spain's economy began to improve. Permanyer promoted the all-around champion motorcyclist Pedro Pi from head test rider to chief development engineer. Leopold Milà was made Technical Director and Permanyer's son Xavier, was to be Sports Assistant. Work began right away on designing a brand new all-unit-construction 175cc engine that by 1960, would power the latest Impala sports roadster model. This engine would form the basis of the company's future trials and motocross machines. To promote sales of this model, three Impalas were taken to Africa where they covered over 12,000 miles of terrain, most of it being off-road. Back in Spain, Pi was busy winning the Spanish motocross and road race championships and working on a new 250cc version.

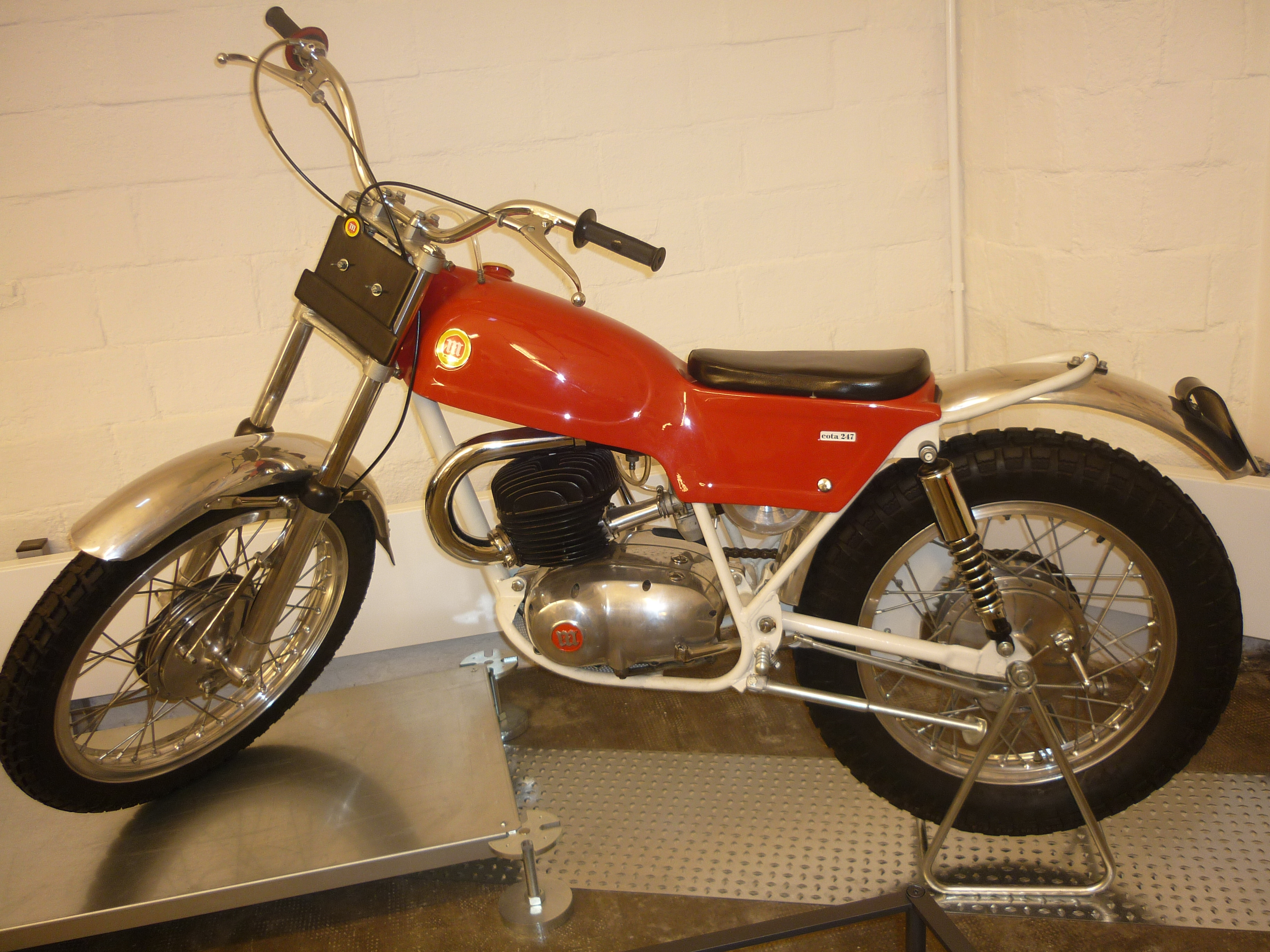
Montesa Cota 247

Following its introduction in 1965, the 250 engine would be the cornerstone of the company's future success. Mounted on the new 250 Scorpion scrambler, Pi won the Spanish championship again in 1966 and the similarly engined Sport roadster won the Barcelona 24-hour endurance road race. In 1967 the first Montesa trials models appeared and in 1968, the motorcycle now retitled the Cota, Pi won the Spanish Trials Championship. After adding this title to go along with the road race and six motocross titles, he retired from competition to devote his full energy to bike development.

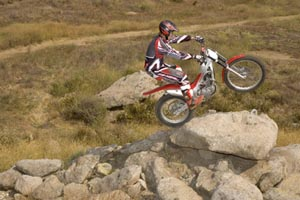
Montesa Cota 4RT

In the decade following, Montesa had unprecedented growth around the world. Unlike Bulto's bike, the Bultaco, Montesa only sent a small percentage of its production to the United States, concentrating mostly on the European market. Trials models were offered in many different sizes 25, 49, 125, 175, 250, 348 and 349, as were motocrossers 125, 175, 250, 360 and 414. This also included a line of street and Enduro models also. In 1973, the VR (Vehkonen Replica) was released and set the standard for 1974, as did the 348 Cota did in 1976. Ulf Karlsson won the World Trials Championship on a Cota in 1980.

The 1974 film Freebie and the Bean directed by Richard Rush features a famous urban trail chase action scene, where the main character Freebie (James Caan), an unorthodox policeman, takes a Montesa Cota 247 from a casual bypassing rider. Freebie then exclaims "It's a Montesa!", and starts a chase after the bad guys, running over cars, stairs, public fountains, etc., until the bike is lost and damaged, lasting for more than three minutes in total.

== Honda partnership ==
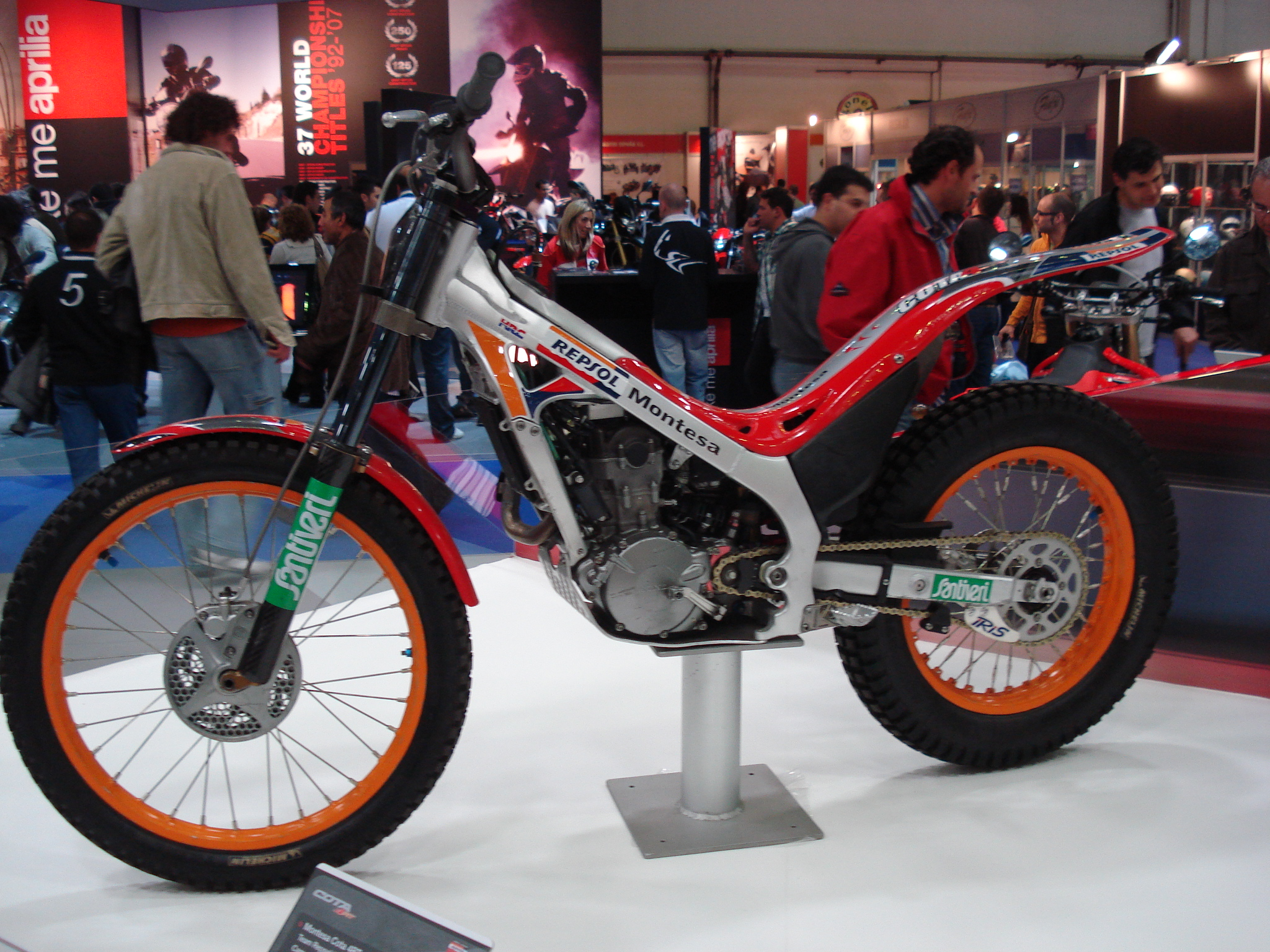
2008 Montesa COTA 4RT

By 1981, another round of economic unrest in Spain began to hinder motorcycle manufacturers. Strikes and a shrinking market left Montesa as the only major motorcycle concern in the country; however they were in need of a major influx of capital in order to continue to survive. A loan from the government and shares sold to Honda (to establish a European manufacturing base for their commuter bikes) helped production continue. Indeed, one of the government's stipulations was that Honda would guarantee that production would not stop. Honda was prepared to stockpile trial bikes and to sell them off at a loss in an effort to reach Europe's more profitable market and to bypass restrictive import tariffs.

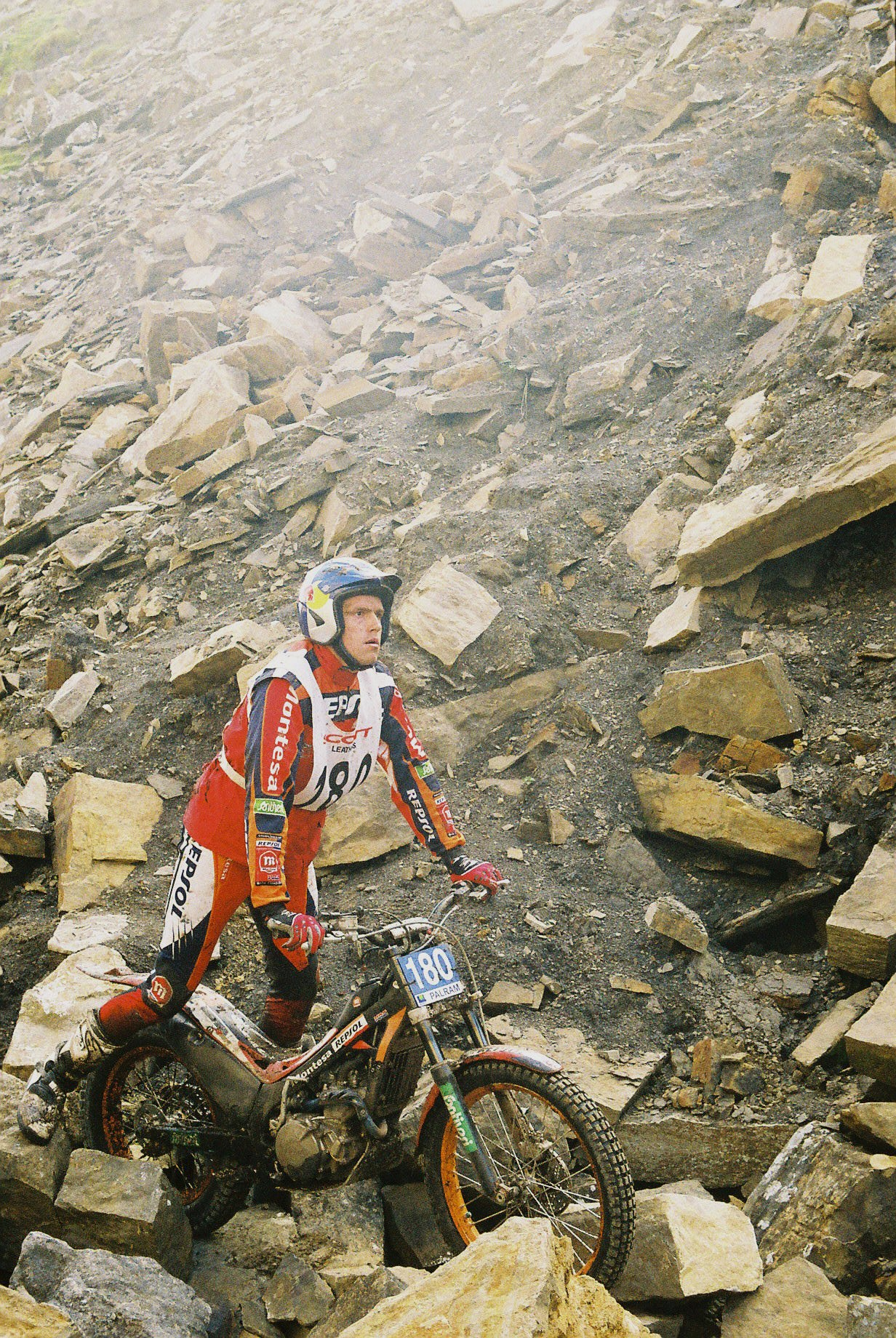
Dougie Lampkin, on a Repsol Montesa 4RT 249, on his way to win the 2007 Scott Trial

In July 1985, a major reorganization took place and a large amount of money from Honda was received. By then, only two trials models were offered and the workforce had dwindled to 152 employees. A year later, there were further financial moves between Honda, Spain's government and the Permanyer family, leading to Honda buying the majority of the family's remaining shares. Honda now had an 85% holding and spent another $5 million on modifying and updating the factory.

Montesa was still active in World Trials competition throughout the 1980s and into the 1990s. Even though reduced to only offering one model, the Cota, such riders like former World Champion Eddy Lejeune and Andrew Codina rode the bike to good results in the mid-'80s. In 1992–93, the liquid-cooled Cota 311 was produced; this was to be the last "real" Montesa. In 1994, a new model, the 314R, was introduced. This model featured an HRC Honda powerplant with many other components from Honda. Montesa-mounted Marc Colomer won the World title in 1996 and the 315R followed in early '97. The 315R had a run of 7 years, taking Dougie Lampkin to many world championships and Takahisa Fujinami for his world championship in 2004 for the bikes last year. It was replaced by the technically advanced four-stroke Cota 4RT in 2005. Spanish trials rider Toni Bou has dominated the world circuit with Montesa Honda since 2007, having won a total of 40 World Championship titles,and various wins at the Trial des Nations.

== See also ==
- Grand Prix motorcycle racing
- List of Honda motorcycles
- Motorcycle engine
