= Bultaco =

Spanish motorcycle manufacturer

Bultaco Compañía Española de Motores S.A.
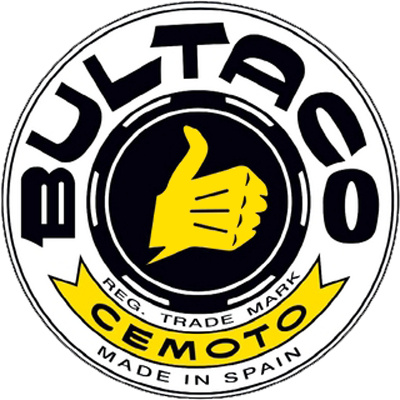

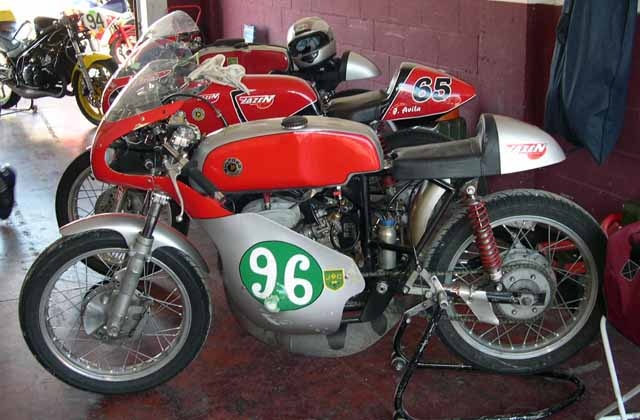
- Bultaco TSS125 road racer
- Industry: Motorcycle; Electric motorcycles
- Founded: 1958
- Defunct: closed in 1983, reopened in 2014
- Headquarters: Barcelona, Spain
- Key people: Francisco Xavier Bultó
- Products: Trials bikes, Motocross bikes

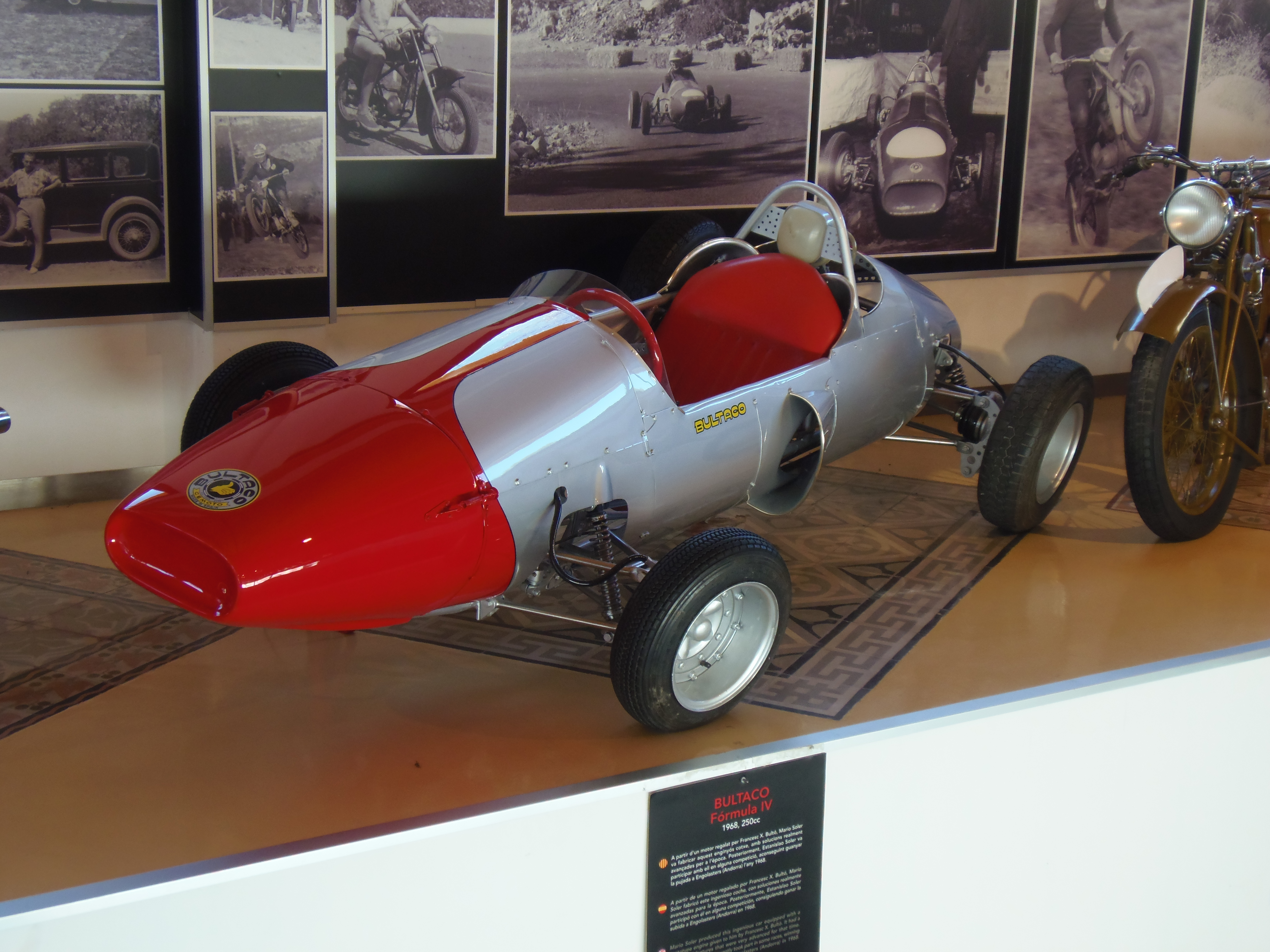
Bultaco Formula IV 1968

Bultaco was a Spanish manufacturer of two-stroke motorcycles from 1958 to 1983.

Former MotoGP star Sete Gibernau is the grandson of Paco Bultó.

== Origins ==
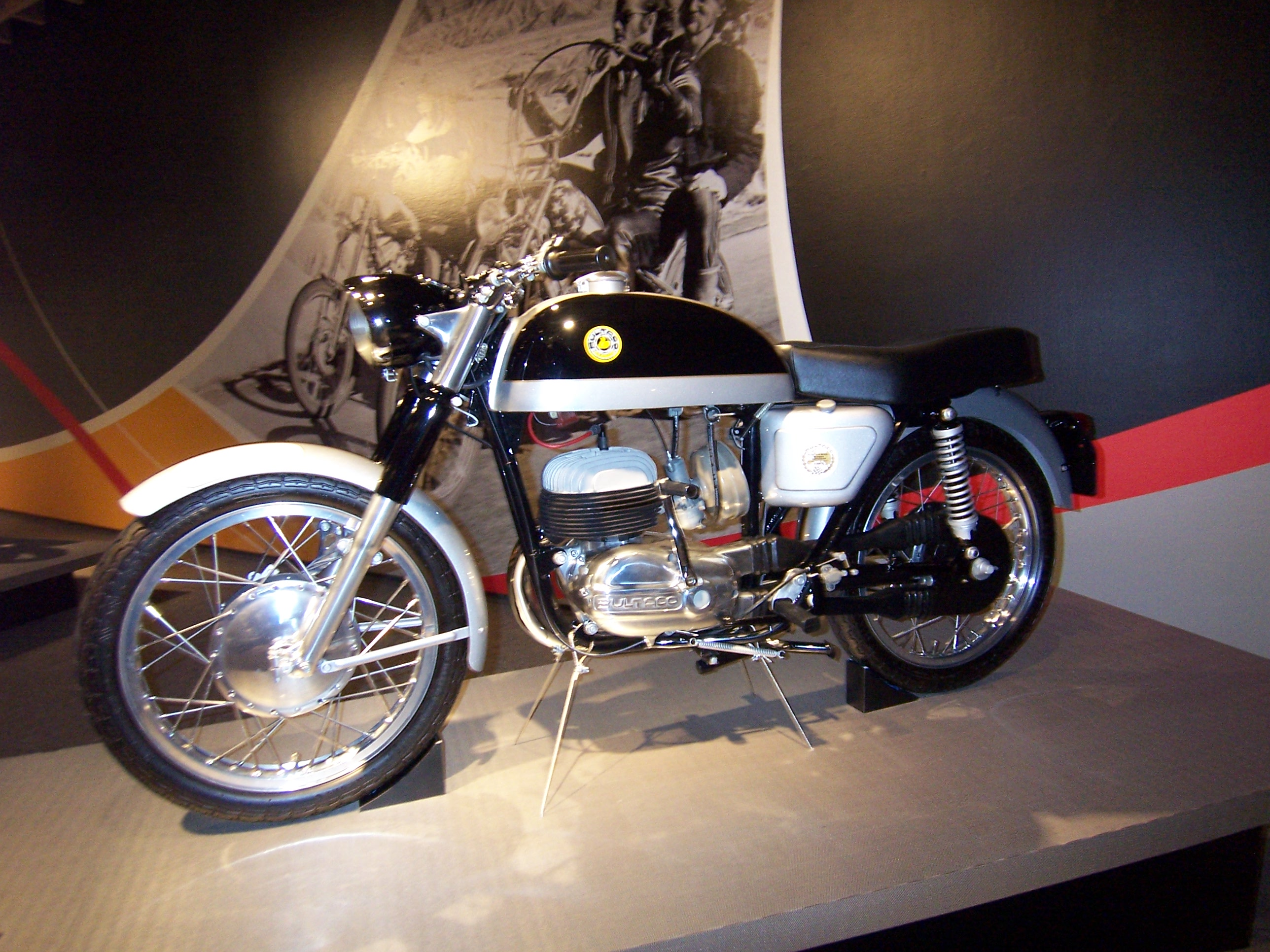
Metralla MK2, 250 cc,1966

Built in Barcelona, Spain, Bultaco motorcycles were exported throughout the world, but their largest market ultimately became the USA, allowing aspiring racers to purchase legitimately competitive motorcycles without modification. The Bultaco engine and transmission were universally interchangeable between models and engine capacities; one could replace the cylinder from a 175 cc engine with a 200 cc, 250 cc, 350 cc, or even 360 cc capacity Bultaco cylinder. As Bultaco produced the cylinders, pistons, rings, and cylinder heads for all engine capacities, no aftermarket parts were required, as with other brands. Due to industrial unrest and market pressures, Bultaco production closed in 1979. The factory reopened in 1980, but closed again in 1983. A new series of electric Bultacos was announced mid-2014, and it began sales in 2015. Sherco motorcycle company, founded in 1998 in Barcelona, derives its name from an amalgamation of two words, Sherpa and Bultaco.

The origin of the Bultaco motorcycle company dates from May 1958. Francesc "Paco" Bultó was a director of the Montesa motorcycle company, founded in 1944. After several years of steady growth and road-racing success, in 1957, Montesa moved to larger facilities. The move was protracted, disrupting production, and was followed by a downturn in the Spanish economy. This slump brought to a head disagreements between Bultó and the other senior director, Pere Permanyer. As an economy measure, Permanyer (the majority shareholder) felt that the company should withdraw from racing. Bultó, the driving force behind the racing program and responsible for much of the company’s technical expertise, was vehemently opposed. Failing to reach a compromise, Bultó decided to leave Montesa to concentrate on his other business interests. Perhaps unsurprisingly, the majority of Montesa's racing department left shortly afterwards, as well.

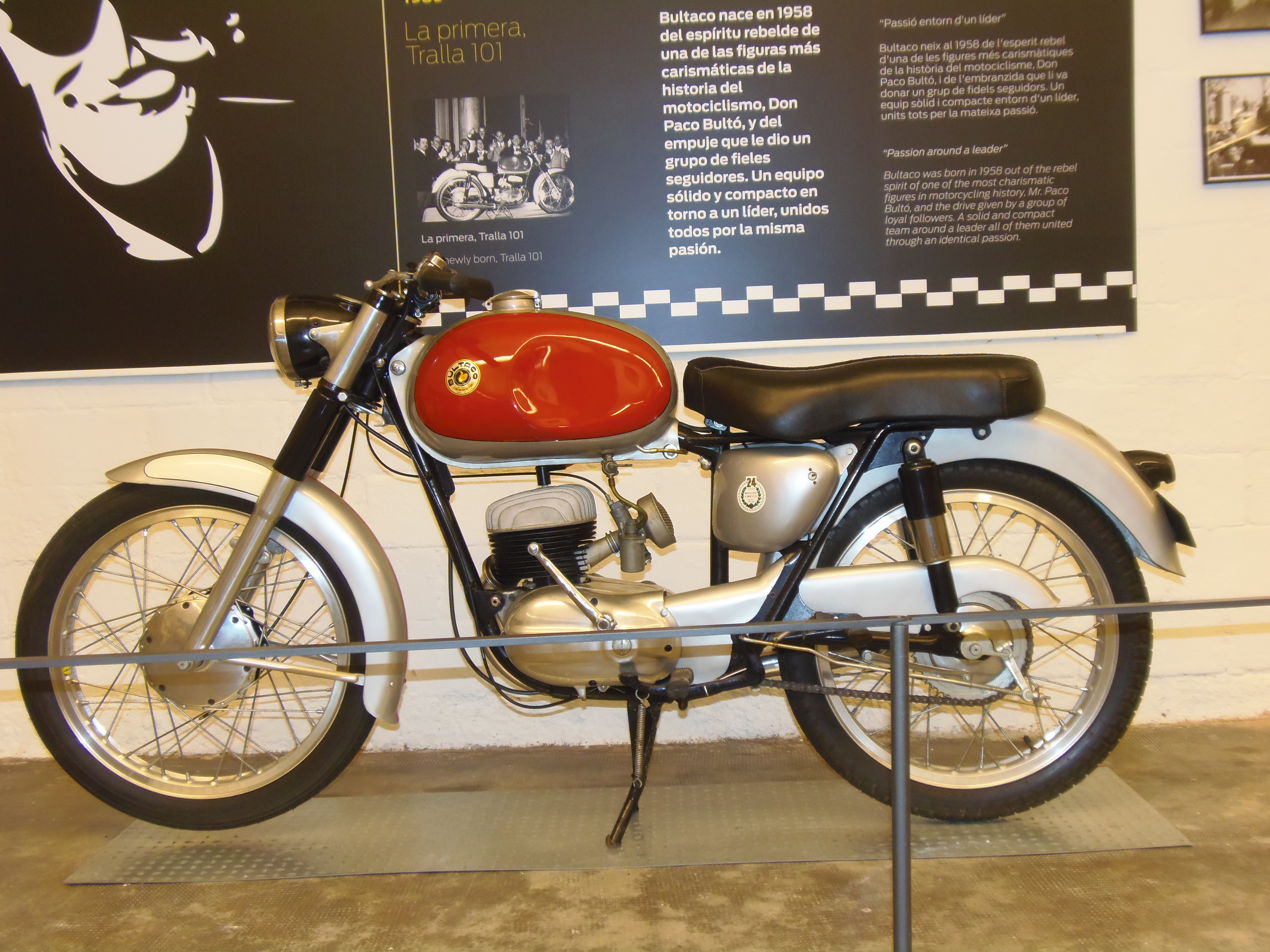
Tralla 101, the first model, launched 1959

The suggestion to form a new company is said to have come a few days later when Sr. Bultó was invited to a meeting by several of the former staff of Montesa's racing department. Keen to return to racing, they persuaded him that their greatest hope lay in forming a new company. Setting up shop in very primitive conditions at an old farm owned by Bultó, things developed quickly. On 24 March 1959, Bultaco held a press day and launched its first motorcycle, the road-going 125 cc Bultaco Tralla 101, named after a Spanish word for whip. Just two months later, Bultaco entered its first Spanish Grand Prix, taking seven of the first ten places.

== Company name and logo ==
"Bultaco" comes from combining the first four letters of Sr. Bultó's surname with the last three of his nickname "Paco". The name was a suggestion of one of Bultaco's premier racers, and close friend of Sr. Bultó, John Grace from Gibraltar. CEMOTO is an acronym for "Compañia Española de Motores". The other part of the company logo, the "Thumbs up" symbol, came after Sr. Bultó witnessed British motorcycle racer David Whitworth giving the signal to his pit crew to signify that all was well. Sete Gibernau had this on the back of his crash helmet when he raced MotoGP.

In 1998, rights to the Bultaco name were purchased by Marc Tessier, who used it to help launch a range of purpose-built trials motorcycles from his company Sherco Moto S.A.R.L. The bikes were initially named Bultaco Shercos. In 2000, the bikes became Sherco by Bultaco, and in 2001, the Bultaco name was dropped altogether. The US trademark is now owned by HDW Enterprises, parent company of a parts and repair specialist for vintage Bultacos.

Bultaco produces electric motorbikes in Barcelona, Catalonia, Spain, also the site of the original 1958 factory.

== Notable products ==
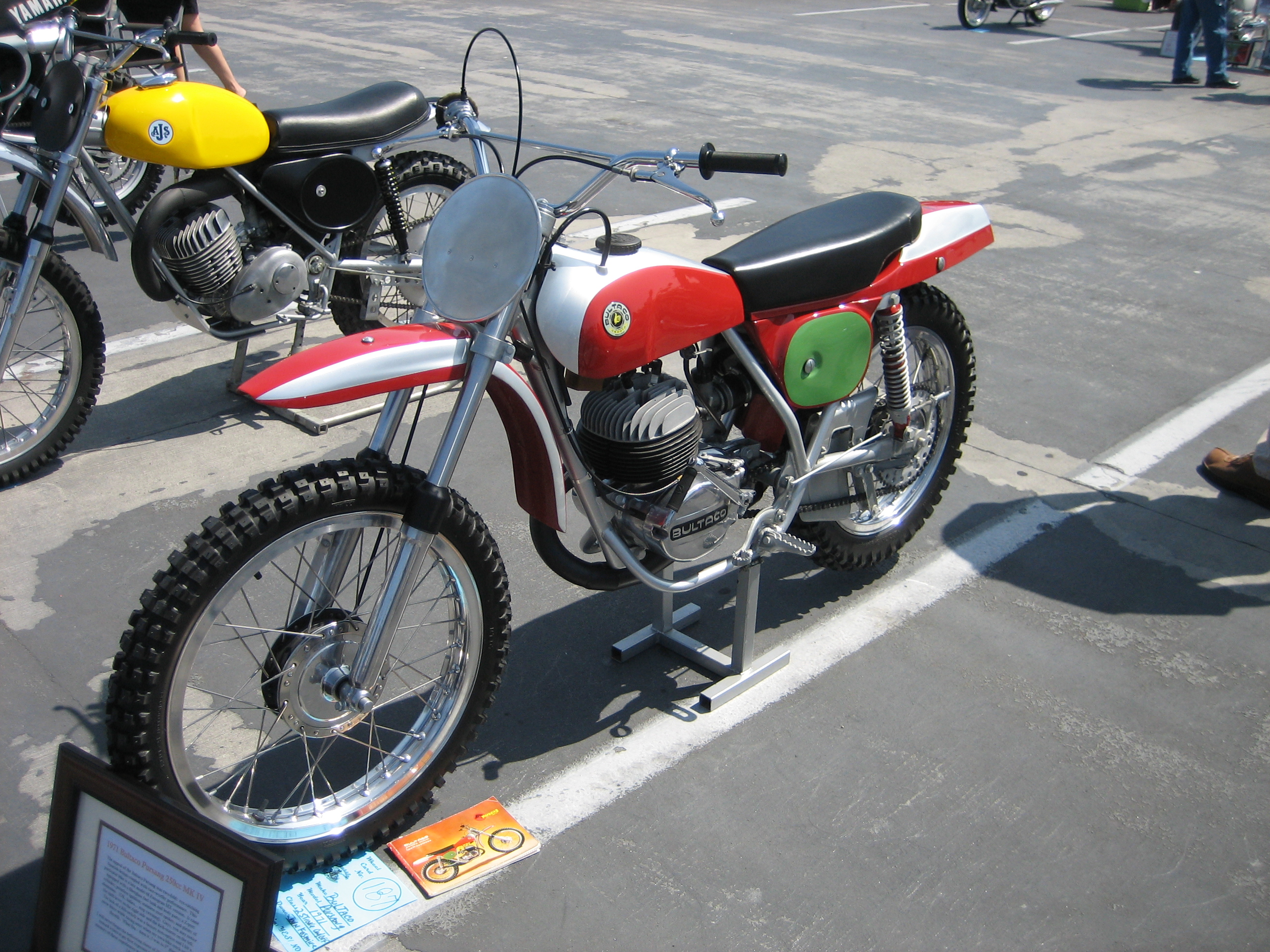
Pursang 250 motocross model

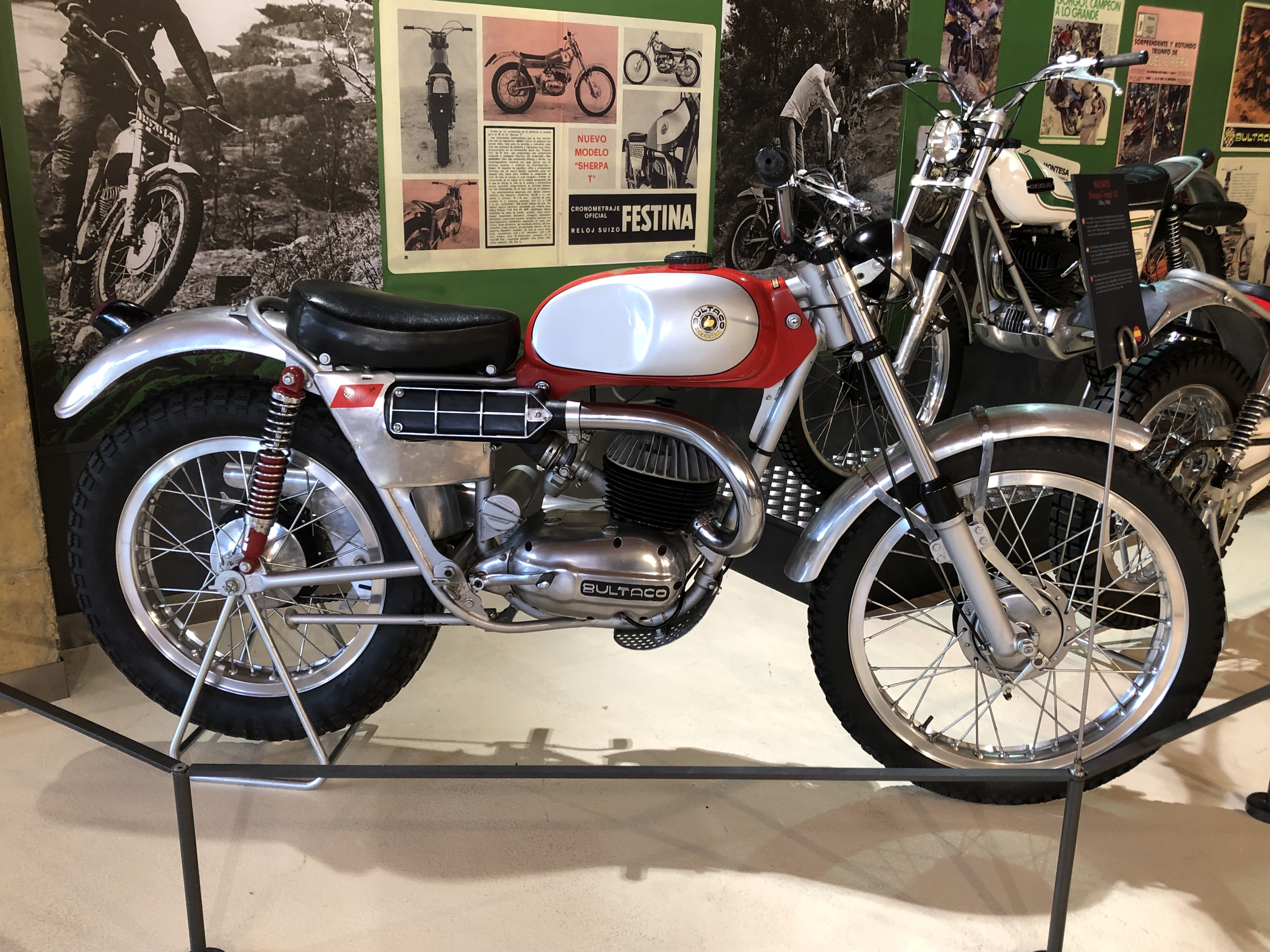
Sherpa T, the first Trials machine, launched 1965

Although they made road and successful road-racing motorcycles, (50cc Grand Prix racing champions in 1976, 1977, 1978 and 1981 with Ángel Nieto and Ricardo Tormo), the company had its greatest success with models for off-road competition - the Pursang for motocross, the Matador for enduros, the Sherpa T for observed trials competition, and the Astro for short flat-track. Perhaps the most famous Bultaco model, the Sherpa T trials bike, revolutionised the sport in the 1960s. At that time, trials were almost exclusively a British sport using big, heavy, four-stroke machines. Irish trials ace Sammy Miller teamed with Bultó to produce a lightweight, two-stroke machine, which, overnight, rendered the heavy four-strokes obsolete.

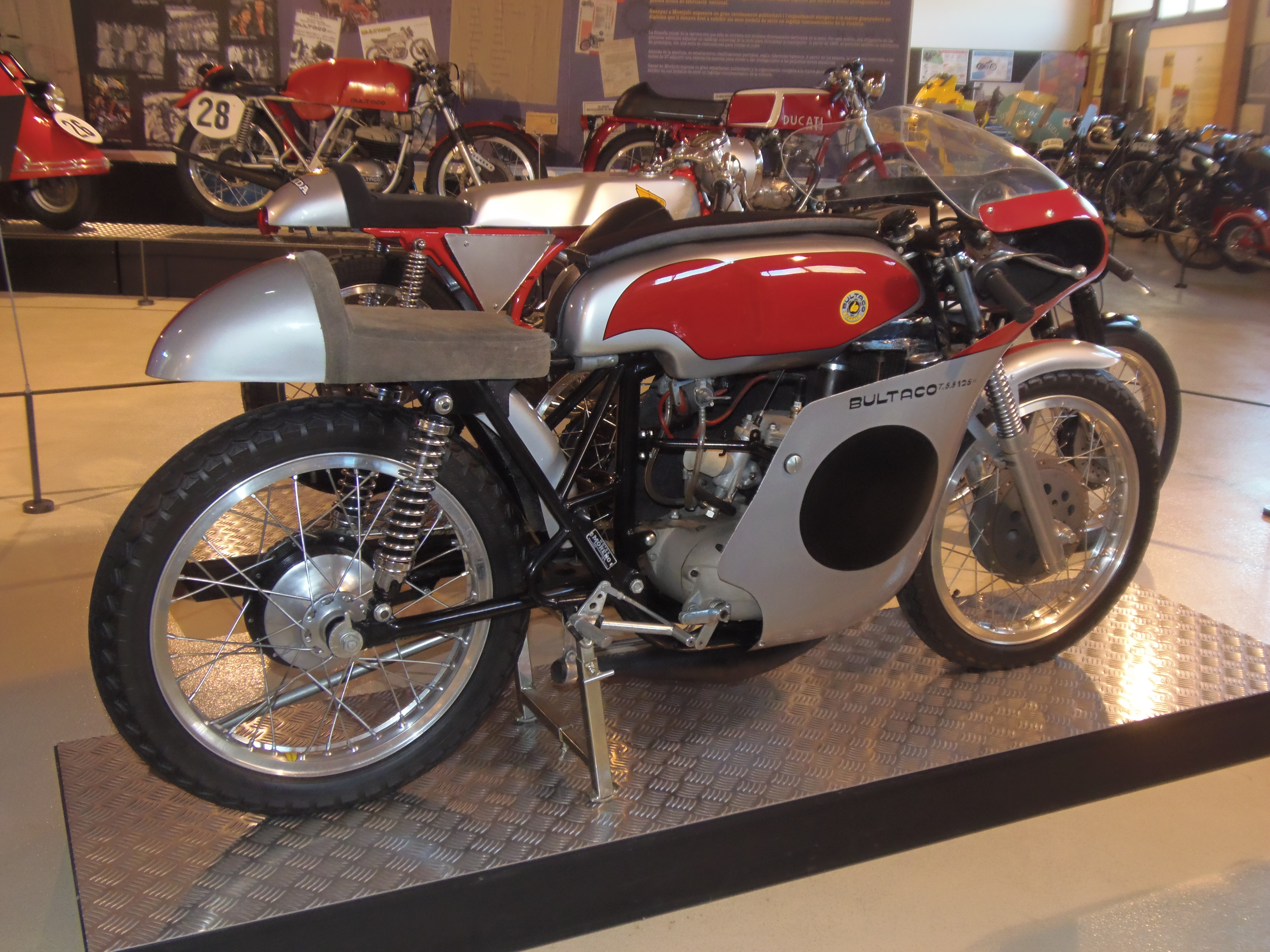
TSS 125, customer racer

Miller won the gruelling Scottish Six Days Trial in 1965, and then repeated the feat with wins in 1967 and 1968. He also claimed the European Trials Championship in 1968 and 1970. This coincided with, and perhaps stimulated, the growth in the popularity of trials in Europe and later the USA, which provided a lucrative market for Bultaco in the years to come. Bultaco dominated the World Trials Championship in the 1970s, winning the title eight times, and winning the Scottish Six Days Trial four times. Bultaco's premier model in the USA, the Pursang, was an excellent-handling and powerful 250 cc competition model that was competitive in virtually any type of speed-based off-road competition.

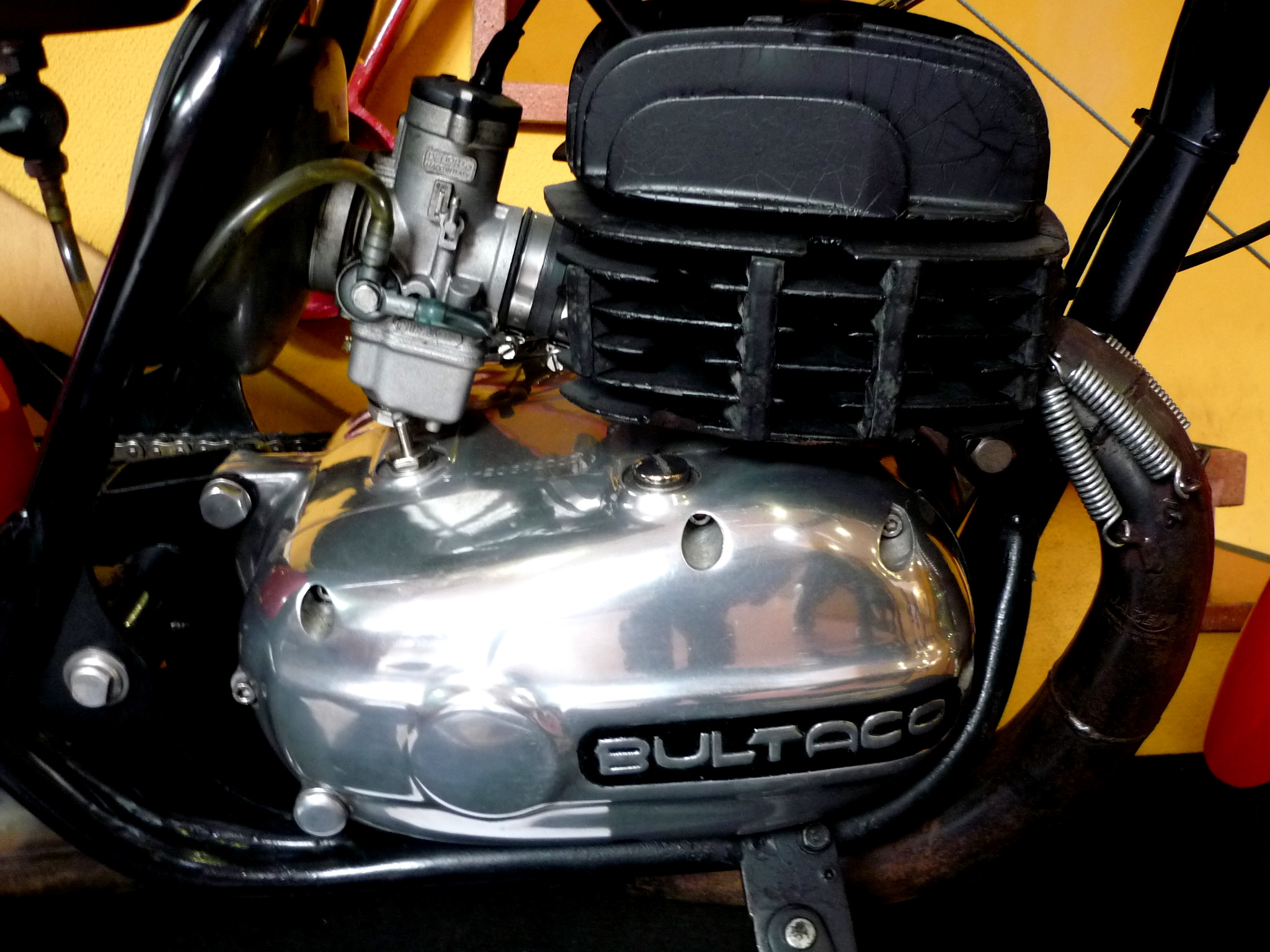
Bultaco engine detail

The Pursang range was later expanded to 125, 360, and 370 cc. The Bultaco Astro was a very popular short-track racer in the United States, and was used by many AMA Grand National riders in the US in pursuit of their championships, including Mike Kidd, Terry Poovey, Bubba Rush, and hundreds of other top-class competitors. The Astro had a superb power band, perfectly suited for short tracks, and some half-miles, as well. Bultaco motorcycles were mainly powered by single-cylinder, air-cooled, two-stroke engines, but they also made water-cooled powerplants. The rider was required to mix the oil and gasoline manually.
