= 2019 NATC Motorcycle Trials season =

The 2019 NATC trials season was the 46th season. It consisted of eight trials events in three main classes: Pro, Expert and Women's Pro. It began on 25 May, with round one in Nebraska and ended with round 8 in Oregon on 23 June.

== Season summary ==
Patrick Smage would claim his eleventh NATC championship in 2019, passing Geoff Aaron as the all time championship leader.

New trials manufacturers Vertigo signed Venezuelen seven-times champion David Avendano to ride the series.

British world championship contender Donna Fox competed in the opening Women's Pro round.

== 2019 NATC trials season calendar ==
Round	Date	Trial	Venue	Pro class	Expert class	Women's Pro
1	25 May	Nebraska	Nehawke	1) Patrick Smage; 2) Jan Peters; 3) David Avendano	1) Will Myers; 2) Jess Kempkes; 3) Ty Cullins	1) Madeleine Hoover; 2) Donna Fox; 3) Kylee Sweeten
2	26 May	Nebraska	Nehawke	1) Patrick Smage; 2) Alexander Myers; 3) Alexander Niederer	1) Will Myers; 2) Jerome Gregorowicz; 3) Ty Cullins	1) Madeleine Hoover; 2) Kylee Sweeten
3	1 June	Minnesota	Gilbert	1) Patrick Smage; 2) Karl Davis; 3) David Avendano	1) Will Myers; 2) Micah Hertrich; 3) Nigel Parker	1) Madeleine Hoover; 2) Kylee Sweeten
4	2 June	Minnesota	Gilbert	1) Patrick Smage; 2) Daniel Blanc-Gonnet; 3) Karl Davis	1) Will Myers; 2) Nigel Parker; 3) Ty Cullins	1) Madeleine Hoover; 2) Kylee Sweeten
5	15 June	Colorado	Howard	1) Patrick Smage; 2) Daniel Blanc-Gonnet; 3) Karl Davis	1) Will Myers; 2) Micah Hertrich; 3) Nigel Parker	1) Madeleine Hoover; 2) Louise Forsley; 3) Kylee Sweeten
6	16 June	Colorado	Howard	1) Patrick Smage; 2) Alexander Niederer; 3) David Avendano	1) Will Myers; 2) Micah Hertrich; 3) Nigel Parker	1) Madeleine Hoover; 2) Louise Forsley; 3) Kylee Sweeten
7	22 June	Oregon	Diamond Mill	1) Patrick Smage; 2) Karl Davis; 3) Josh Roper	1) Will Myers; 2) Keith Sweeten; 3) Nigel Parker	1) Louise Forsley
8	23 June	Oregon	Diamond Mill	1) Patrick Smage; 2) Alexander Niederer; 3) Josh Roper	1) Oliver Smith; 2) Jerome Gregorowicz; 3) Micah Hertrich	1) Louise Forsley

=== Scoring system ===
Points were awarded to the top twenty finishers in each class. All eight rounds counted for the Pro class, and the best of seven in Expert and Women's Pro classes were counted.

Position	1st	2nd	3rd	4th	5th	6th	7th	8th	9th	10th	11th	12th	13th	14th	15th	16th	17th	18th	19th	20th
Points	30	25	21	18	16	15	14	13	12	11	10	9	8	7	6	5	4	3	2	1

=== NATC Pro final standings ===
Pos	Rider	Machine	NE (Nebraska)	NE (Nebraska)	MN (Minnesota)	MN (Minnesota)	CO (Colorado)	CO (Colorado)	OR (Oregon)	OR (Oregon)	Pts	notes
1	(United States) Patrick Smage	Sherco	1	1	1	1	1	1	1	1	240	
2	(Austria) Alexander Niederer	Gas Gas	4	3	7	4	6	2	5	2	152	
3	(United States) Karl Davis Jr	Scorpa	6	8	2	3	3	5	2	6	151	winner of 2019 Ute Cup (RMTA)
4	(United States) Daniel Blanc-Gonnet	Gas Gas	8	9	4	2	2	4	4	4	147	
5	(United States) Josh Roper	Sherco	5	5	5	5	5	8	3	3	135	
6	(United States) Alexander Myers	Scorpa	7	2	6	7	4	6	7	5	131	
7	(Venezuela) David Avendano	Vertigo	3	4	3	6	-	3	8	7	123	
8	(United States) Samuel Fastle	Sherco	10	6	8	9	7	7	6	8	107	
9	(Austria) Andreas Niederer	Beta	9	10	9	8	8	9	10	10	95	
10	(Germany) Jan Peters	TSR	2	7	-	-	-	-	-	-	39	
11	(United States) Will Myers	Scorpa	-	-	-	-	-	-	-	9	12	
12	(United Kingdom) Oliver Smith	Sherco	-	-	-	-	-	-	9	-	12	

=== NATC Expert final standings ===
Pos	Rider	Machine	NE (Nebraska)	NE (Nebraska)	MN (Minnesota)	MN (Minnesota)	CO (Colorado)	CO (Colorado)	OR (Oregon)	OR (Oregon)	Pts	notes
1	(United States) Will Myers	Scorpa	1	1	1	1	1	1	1	-	210	
2	(United States) Micah Hertrich	Montesa	6	5	2	5	2	2	3	3	149 (164)	
3	(United States) Jerome Gregorowicz	Beta	4	2	4	4	5	4	4	2	140 (156)	
4	(United States) Nigel Parker	Sherco	7	6	3	2	3	3	5	4	139 (151)	
5	(United States) Nick Fonzi	Montesa	8	7	7	7	4	5	-	-	89	
6	(United States) Ty Cullins	Gas Gas	3	3	6	3	-	-	-	-	78	
7	(Canada) Jonathan English	Beta	5	4	5	6	-	-	-	-	65	
8	(United States) Keith Sweeten	Montesa	-	-	-	-	-	-	2	5	41	
9	(United States) Madeleine Hoover	Gas Gas	-	-	-	-	-	-	6	6	30	
10	(United Kingdom) Oliver Smith	Sherco	-	-	-	-	-	-	-	1	30	
11	(United States) Jess Kempkes	TRS	2	-	-	-	-	-	-	-	25	
12	(United States) Randy Gibson	TRS	-	-	-	-	6	-	-	-	15	

=== NATC Women's Pro final standings ===
Pos	Rider	Machine	NE (Nebraska)	NE (Nebraska)	MN (Minnesota)	MN (Minnesota)	CO (Colorado)	CO (Colorado)	OR (Oregon)	OR (Oregon)	Pts	notes
1	(United States) Madeleine Hoover	Gas Gas	1	1	1	1	1	1	-	-	180	
2	(United States) Kylee Sweeten	Sherco	3	2	2	2	3	3	-	-	138	
3	(United States) Louise Forsley	Scorpa	-	-	-	-	2	2	1	1	110	
4	(United Kingdom) Donna Fox	Montesa	2	-	-	-	-	-	-	-	25	

== See also ==
- Trial des Nations
- Scott Trial
- FIM Trial World Championship
- FIM Trial European Championship
