= Gustav Franke =

German motorcycle racer

- Nationality: German
- Born: 4 December 1937 (age 88); Grottkau, Germany (today Grodków in Poland)
- Current team: Retired

Gustav Franke (born 4 December 1937 in Grottkau, Germany), is a former German International motorcycle trials rider. He was FIM Trial Challenge Henry Groutars Champion in 1965 and 1966.

== Biography ==
Franke was the top trials rider in Germany throughout most of the 1960s. He won his first national title in 1962 and defended it in 1963.

Franke competed in the inaugural Challenge Henry Groutars Championship in 1964 finishing runner up to British Greeves rider Don Smith. Franke had won the opening round in Belgium but the French and German rounds went Smith, and with them the title. On the national scene, Franke was once again German Trials Champion.

In 1965, Franke won the championship ahead of fellow Zündapp rider Andreas Brandl. He retained the title in 1966, this time holding off Don Smith. He won the German national title both years.

The pair resumed their rivalry in 1967, this time with Smith taking the win ahead of Franke by ten points.

The Challenge Henry Groutars was renamed the European Championship for the 1968 season, and with it came a new winner. Irishman Sammy Miller took his Bultaco to victory with Franke finishing a strong second place. Franke competed in the European championships until his final international year in 1971.

Franke added the 1967, 1968 and 1969 German Trials Championships to his tally before his eight-year run was ended in 1970 by Ludwig Terne, although Franke did add one final title to his name by winning once again in 1971.

== International Trials Championship Career ==
| Year | Class | Machine | Rd 1 | Rd 2 | Rd 3 | Rd 4 | Rd 5 | Rd 6 | Rd 7 | Rd 8 | Rd 9 | Points | Pos | Notes |
|---|---|---|---|---|---|---|---|---|---|---|---|---|---|---|
| 1964 | Challenge Henry Groutars | Zündapp | BEL; 1 | FRA; 5 | GER; 3 | | | | | | | 61 | 2nd | |
| 1965 | Challenge Henry Groutars | Zündapp | FRA; 1 | BEL; 1 | | | | | | | | 50 | 1st | Trophy winner |
| 1966 | Challenge Henry Groutars | Zündapp | GER; 1 | FRA; 13 | BEL; 2 | | | | | | | 55 | 1st | Trophy winner |
| 1967 | Challenge Henry Groutars | Zündapp | SWI; 3 | BEL; 3 | GER; 3 | FRA; 2 | | | | | | 82 | 2nd | |
| 1968 | FIM European Championship | Zündapp | SWI; 4 | GER; 2 | BEL; 4 | FRA; 5 | GBR; 2 | | | | | 15 | 2nd | |
| 1969 | FIM European Championship | Zündapp | SWI; 5 | FRA - | GER; 1 | BEL; 6 | GBR - | SWE - | | | | 26 | 4th | |
| 1970 | FIM European Championship | Zündapp | GBR; 7 | FRA - | GBR - | BEL - | IRL - | SPA - | FIN - | SWE - | POL - | 4 | 28th | |
| 1971 | FIM European Championship | Zündapp | GER; 2 | GBR - | BEL - | IRL - | FRA; 6 | SPA - | SWI - | FIN - | SWE - | 17 | 9th | |

== Honors ==
- German Trials Champion 1962, 1963, 1964, 1965, 1966, 1967, 1968, 1969, 1971
- Challenge Henry Groutars Trials Champion 1965, 1966 (later renamed the World Championship)

== Related Reading ==
- FIM Trial European Championship
- FIM Trial World Championship
