= Takahisa =

- Gender: Male

Origin
- Origin: Japanese
- Meaning: Different meanings depending on the kanji used

Takahisa (written: 貴久, 貴永, 敬久, 孝久, 高久 or 隆久) is a masculine Japanese given name. Notable people with the name include:

- Takahisa Fujinami (藤波 貴久; born 1980), Japanese motorcycle trials rider
- Takahisa Kawakami (川上 隆久; born 1950), Japanese United Nations official
- Takahisa Maeyama (前山 剛久; born 1991), Japanese former actor
- Takahisa Masuda (増田 貴久; born 1986), Japanese singer and actor
- Takahisa Nishiyama (西山 貴永; born 1985), Japanese footballer
- Takahisa Oguchi (小口 貴久; born 1979), Japanese luger
- Shimazu Takahisa (島津 貴久; 1514–1571), Japanese daimyō
- Shinagawa Takahisa (品川 高久; 1576–1639), Japanese samurai
- Takahisa Yoshida (吉田 孝久; born 1970), Japanese high jumper
- Takahisa Zeze (瀬々 敬久; born 1960), Japanese film director and screenwriter
