= Maria Conway =

British motorcycle racer

- Nationality: (United Kingdom) British
- Born: 19 May 1984 (age 42); Oxford, England
- Current team: Retired

Maria Conway (born 19 May 1984 in Oxford, England), is a former British Women's International motorcycle trials rider. Conway was British Women's Trials Champion in 2002 and a member of the winning British Women's TDN team in 2006 and 2007.

== Biography ==
Conway competed in the inaugural Women's World Trials Championship in 2000 placing ninth in the series.

In 2001, Conway again competed in the World Championships, narrowly missing out on the podium finishing in fourth place, the top placed British rider in the event.

2002 was to be Conway's year, taking the first ever British Women's Trials Championship ahead of Donna Fox and placing fifth in the World Championships that year held in Portugal.

The best finish in the World Championships for Conway was to come the following year in 2003 when she ended the season in third place behind Laia Sanz and Iris Kramer at the event in San Marino. In the European Women's Championship, the finish was to be identical with a podium of Sanz, Kramer and Conway. During the season, she also ventured over to the US to compete in the final two rounds of the NATC Trials Championship winning both events ahead of US Champion Christy Williams. To top off a busy season, Conway was a member of the British Women's TDN team which finished runner-up to the German team in Italy.

Conway returned to Italy with the TDN team in 2005 and again finished runner-up to a strong German team. Add to this a fourth place in the European Championships and a fifth in the World Championships; it can be chalked up as another successful season for Conway.

The highlight of 2006 was being a member of the British Women's TDN Team that took the win ahead of the Spanish team. The other members of the team that took victory in France were Donna Fox and Rebekah Cook.

With the British TDN team now being heralded as one of the favourites, they once again took the win in 2007, this time on home soil as the event was held on the Isle of Man. Runners up were the German team. She also finished fifth in the World Championship after placing sixth in the Czech round and fifth in the British round.

2008 again produced a fifth place in the World Championship. Conway was again a member of the TDN team which finished third behind the Spanish and German teams .

== International Trials Championship career ==
Year	Class	Machine	Rd 1	Rd 2	Rd 3	Points	Pos	Notes
2000	FIM World Women's	Montesa	SPA; 9			7	9th	
2001	FIM European Women's	Montesa	SPA; 7	ITA; 5		20	5th	
2001	FIM World Women's	Montesa	ITA; 4			13	4th	
2002	FIM European Women's	Montesa	NOR; 11	SPA; 5		16	9th	
2002	FIM World Women's	Montesa	POR; 5			11	5th	
2003	FIM European Women's	Beta	FRA; 4	ITA; 3	RSM; 3	43	3rd	
2003	FIM World Women's	Beta	RSM; 3			15	3rd	
2004	FIM European Women's	Beta	FRA; 3	GER; 3	SPA -	30	7th	
2005	FIM European Women's	Beta	ITA; 3	NOR; 6	ITA; 4	38	4th	
2005	FIM World Women's	Beta	ITA; 3	ITA; 5		24	4th	
2006	FIM World Women's	Beta	AND -	BEL; 6	FRA; 7	19	7th	
2007	FIM World Women's	Beta	CZE; 6	BEL -	GBR; 5	21	5th	
2008	FIM World Women's	Beta	LUX; 4	SPA; 6	AND; 7	23	5th	

== Honors ==
- British Women's Trials Champion 2002
- Women's TDN Winning Team Member 2006, 2007

== Related reading ==
- FIM Trial European Championship
- FIM Trial World Championship
