= Alexz =

Alexz is a unisex (though more often masculine) given name, a variant of Alexander, which means 'defending men'. Notable people with the given name or nickname include:

- Alexz Johnson (born 1986), Canadian singer-songwriter, record producer, actress, and philanthropist
- Alexz Wigg (born 1989), English international motorcycle trials rider

== See also ==
- Alex
