= Ina Wilde =

German motorcycle racer

- Nationality: German
- Born: 8 March 1990 (age 36); Schwerte, Germany
- Current team: Gas Gas

Ina Wilde (born 8 March 1990) is a German woman's international motorcycle trials rider. She is a four-time German Women's Trials Champion, winning in 2010, 2012, 2013 and 2014. In 2014, she also won the European Women's Championship.

== Biography ==
Wilde was runner-up to Gas-Gas rider Rosita Leotta in the 2008 German Women's Trials Championship, and again in 2009 before clinching the title in 2010. In 2011, she contested only the FIM Trial European Championship and the FIM Trial World Championship before returning to domestic competition in 2012, winning the German Women's title in 2012, 2013 and again in 2014. Wilde scored her best World Championship finish in the final round of the 2014 series in Andorra, scoring a fourth place which landed her 6th in the championship final standings.

== National Trials Championship Career ==
Year	Class	Machine	Rd 1	Rd 2	Rd 3	Rd 4	Rd 5	Rd 6	Rd 7	Rd 8	Rd 9	Rd 10	Points	Pos	Notes
2006	(Germany) German Women's		HER -	HER -	DRE -	DRE -	PIE; 1	PIE; 3					123.3	3rd	
2007	(Germany) German Women's	Sherco	GRO -	GRO -	HOL -	ROS -	SCH -	SCH -	ROH -	ROH; 3	NEU -	NEU -	18.8	3rd	
2008	(Germany) German Women's	Sherco	GRO; 2	GRO; 2	DRE; 2	DRE; 2	OSN; 2	OSN; 1					517.4	2nd	
2009	(Germany) German Women's	Sherco	ROH; 3	ROH; 2	NEU; 2	NEU; 1	OSN -	OSN -					151.1	2nd	
2010	(Germany) German Women's	Sherco	GRO; 1	GRO; 1	SCH; 1	SCH; 1	RUN; 2	RUN; 1	SCH; 1	SCH; 1	OSN; 1	OSN; 1	1011.8	1st	German Women's champion
2012	(Germany) German Women's	Sherco	SCH; 1	SCH; 1	OSN; 1	OSN; 1							80	1st	German Women's champion
2013	(Germany) German Women's	Sherco	SPE; 1	SPE; 1	KIE; 1	KIE; 2							77	1st	German Women's champion
2014	(Germany) German Women's	Gas Gas	SCH; 2	SCH; 2	KIE; 2	KIE; 1	WER; 2	WER; 1	OSN; 1	OSN; 1			148	1st	German Women's champion
2014	(Netherlands) Dutch National	Gas Gas	MAA -	NUN -	SLE -	ZEL -	SCH; 6	MAA -	ROT -	ZEL -	ZEL -		10	19th	
2015	(Germany) German Women's	Gas Gas	ROH; 1	ROH; 2	WIE; 2	WIE; 2	WIL; 2	WIL; 4	OSN; 2	OSN; 2			135	2nd	
2016	(Germany) German Women's	Gas Gas	SCH; 2	SCH; 1	OSN; 2	OSN; 3							69	2nd	
2017	(Germany) German Women's	Gas Gas	FRA -	FRA -	SCH -	SCH -	OSN; 2	OSN; 2	WUS; 1	WUS; 2			71	6th	

== International Trials Championship Career ==
Year	Class	Machine	Rd 1	Rd 2	Rd 3	Rd 4	Rd 5	Points	Pos	Notes
2007	FIM World Women's	Sherco	CZE; 14	BEL -	GBR -			2	15th	
2008	FIM European Women's	Sherco	FRA; 13	ITA -	CZE; 10			9	12th	
2008	FIM World Women's	Sherco	LUX; 10	SPA -	AND; 5			17	8th	
2009	FIM European Women's	Sherco	POL -	ITA; 6	CZE; 6			20	6th	
2009	FIM World Women's	Sherco	AND -	FRA; 8	ITA; 9			15	9th	
2010	FIM World Women's	Sherco	FRA; 8	CZE; 6	POL; 10			18	7th	
2011	FIM European Women's	Sherco	ITA -	GER; 9	CZE; 11			12	11th	
2011	FIM World Women's	Sherco	GER; 8	CZE; 8	ITA; 6			18	8th	
2012	FIM European Women's	Sherco	ITA -	CZE; 4	NED; 5			24	8th	
2012	FIM World Women's	Sherco	AND -	AND -	SWI; 12	SWI -	SWI; 10	10	15th	
2013	FIM World Women's	Sherco	AND -	AND -	FRA; 5	FRA; 7	FRA; 14	22	11th	
2014	FIM European Women's	Sherco	ITA; 1	POL; 2	POL; 2	BEL; 1		370	1st	FIM European Women's champion
2014	FIM World Women's	Gas Gas	BEL; 7	SPA; 4	SPA; 6	AND; 4		36	6th	
2015	FIM World Women's	Gas Gas	CZE; 7	CZE; 2	SPA; 3	SPA; 7	SPA; 10	41	4th	
2016	FIM World Women's	Gas Gas	GBR -	GBR -	ITA -	ITA -	FRA; 8	8	17th	
2017	FIM World Women's	Gas Gas	USA; 6	USA; 7	CZE; 3	ITA; 7		43	5th	

== Honors ==
- German Women's Trials Champion 2010, 2012, 2013, 2014
- European Women's Trials Champion 2014
