= Jordi Tarrés =

Jordi Tarrés may refer to:

- Jordi Tarrés (motorcycle trials rider) (born 1966), Spanish motorcycle trials rider in off-road competitions
- Jordi Tarrés (footballer) (born 1981), Hong Kong footballer
