= Claire Bertrand =

French motorcycle racer

- Nationality: (France) French
- Born: 7 September 1982 (age 44); Antibes, France
- Current team: Retired

Claire Bertrand (born 7 September 1982), is a former French Women's International motorcycle trials rider. She is a seven-time French Women's Trials Champion, winning the title in 2000 through 2006 inclusive and was a member of the winning French Women's TDN team in 2004.

== Biography ==
In 2000, Bertrand won the French Women's Trials Championship, this was to be the start of a seven-year unbeaten run. She was also a member of the French TDN team that finished runner-up to a strong Spanish team. To round out the season Bertrand finished third in the Inaugural Women's Trials World Championship behind Laia Sanz and Iris Kramer.

Another French title went to Bertrand in 2001, along with third place once again in the World Championships. A feat repeated in 2002.

In 2003, Bertrand again won the French Championship, this time ahead of Marlene Satge.

2004 was to be a successful year for Bertrand. She not only added another French title to her haul but also led the French TDN Women's team of Satge and Marilyn Journet to victory over the Japanese and Spanish teams in Spain. She was also to score her best International positions by finishing runner-up to Sanz in both the European and World Championships.

The 2005 defence of the TDN title didn't go exactly as planned with the French team rolling home in 5th place. A sixth French title was added in 2005 when she won ahead of TDN teammate Journet. A seventh French National title was won in 2006, and Bertrand once again found herself amongst the top in the European Championships, returning to third place once more behind Sanz and Kramer.

== International Trials Championship Career ==
Year	Class	Machine	Rd 1	Rd 2	Rd 3	Points	Pos	Notes
1999	FIM European Women's	Montesa	ITA; 4			13	4th	
2000	FIM European Women's	Montesa	GBR; 3	ITA; 3	NOR; 3	45	3rd	French Women's Champion
2000	FIM World Women's	Montesa	SPA; 3			15	3rd	
2001	FIM European Women's	Gas Gas	SPA; 4	ITA; 4		26	3rd	French Women's Champion
2001	FIM World Women's	Montesa	ITA; 3			15	3rd	
2002	FIM European Women's	Gas Gas	NOR; 3	SPA; 4		28	4th	French Women's Champion
2002	FIM World Women's	Gas Gas	POR; 3			15	3rd	
2003	FIM European Women's	Gas Gas	FRA; 3	ITA -	RSM -	15	11th	French Women's Champion
2004	FIM European Women's	Gas Gas	FRA; 5	GBR; 4	SPA; 2	41	2nd	French Women's Champion
2004	FIM World Women's	Gas Gas	SPA; 2	SPA; 3		32	2nd	
2005	FIM European Women's	Gas Gas	ITA; 6	NOR; 3	ITA; 5	36	5th	French Women's Champion
2005	FIM World Women's	Gas Gas	ITA; 5	FRA; 3		24	4th	
2006	FIM European Women's	Gas Gas	FRA; 3	ITA; 4	SPA; 3	43	3rd	French Women's Champion
2006	FIM World Women's	Gas Gas	AND; 4	BEL; 4	FRA; 10	26	4th	
2007	FIM European Women's	Montesa	SPA; 5	ITA; 4	NOR -	24	6th	
2007	FIM World Women's	Montesa	CZE; 7	BEL -	GBR; 7	18	8th	

== Honors ==
- French Women's Trials Champion 2000, 2001, 2002, 2003, 2004, 2005, 2006
- Women's TDN Winning Team Member 2004

== Related Reading ==
- FIM Trial European Championship
- FIM Trial World Championship
