= Don Smith (motorcyclist) =

British motorcycle racer

- Nationality: (United Kingdom) British
- Born: 29 December 1937; London, England
- Died: 6 October 2004 (aged 66); Addenbrookes Hospital, Cambridge
- Current team: Retired

Don Smith (29 December 1937 – 6 October 2004), was a British International motorcycle trials rider. He was born in East London. Smith was the first FIM Trials World Champion in 1964 when the championship was known by its original title of Challenge Henry Groutars. Smith again won the title in 1967, before winning a final time in 1969. He died in Addenbrookes Hospital, Cambridge on 6 October 2004 at the age of 66.

== Biography ==
Smith was the winner of what is regarded as the Inaugural FIM Trial World Championship in 1964, at the time known as the Challenge Henry Groutars Championship. He won ahead of German rider Gustav Franke, taking wins at the French and German rounds. The following year, he finished in eighth place in the championship. 1966 saw Smith back on form with a second place finish behind rival Franke.

For the 1967 season, Smith turned the tables on Franke, taking his factory Greeves to wins in Switzerland and Belgium and taking back the title. Smith left the Greeves camp at the end of 1967 and switched to the Montesa for the 1968 season, finishing sixth.

The Challenge Henry Groutars was renamed the European Trials Championship for 1969, and this year saw Smith take his final championship title win, this time ahead of countryman Denis Jones and Sammy Miller. 1970 was to be Smith's final year of competing in the European Championships and he ended the season in eighth place, with a season best of third in Belgium behind Miller and Laurence Telling.

In the early 1970's, Smith travelled to Japan and the giant Kawasaki heavy industries to design, develop and build the very first trials machine for them. During his stay, Smith insisted on staying at the local pure Japanese Hotel rather than the more American style hotel which was 18 miles distant. He declared he was there to work and so needed to be close by. Within a week he had the hotel making tea English - style and they gave him the friendly nickname 'crazy Don'.

In 1974, Smith undertook a 4-month promotional tour of the US with Kawasaki and was credited with being the perfect ambassador for the sport of trials. He appeared as the interval attraction at Anaheim Stadium during a football game between LA and Miami Dolphins.

During the mid 1970's, Smith designed and built an off road push bike which he named 'The Springer' and was a very early forerunner of the BMX bike. Despite much pressing, he could not engage manufacturers to produce the bike. He would later return to BMX in the early 1980s, forming his own team 'Ace' and discovered some local East London lads who joined the team and enjoyed great success- winning all there was to win in the emerging BMX scene. Smith and his star riders were engaged by Mongoose and went on to International success ( Andy Ruffell being the stand out rider ). Smith designed and built BMX tracks and is credited with being responsible for bringing BMX to the fore in the UK.

Another innovative design and build by Smith was a safety footrest for Speedway machines. As a former Speedway rider for West Ham and Hackney, Smith had witnessed many serious injuries inflicted by rigid footrests. In his workshop at his Chingford home, Smith produced a very simple hinged design which would simply fold when met with force and therefore not become an additional part of the rider's body. Riders were immediately impressed and many used the new foot rest. As a result of trials with the great speedway champion Ivan Mauger (six-time world champion), Smith's safety footrest became mandatory equipment in 1971 on all speedway motorcycles. This device saved many riders from serious injury. As a result of his prowess as a motorcycle champion and his services to his sport, his picture was included on an Isle of Man postage stamp.

Smith also ran Trials Schools for riders wishing to improve. These were a great success as Smith's gift for communication came to the fore once again.

Smith returned to the trials scene in the early 2000s, having not been involved for many years. He commented that "he could not do things by halves" and this was the reason he was absent for many years. His partner Rene had died in 2002 aged only 59 and Smith needed a focus. He led the parade on the 2003 Scottish Six Day Trial and spent time with top rider Peter Gaunt and his former competition manager Bill Brooker. Smith and Brooker had known each other since Smith completed his National Service serving in the Parachute Regiment and Brooker was his senior. (Smith overcame a fear of heights to complete many parachute jumps as this also enabled him to compete in trials events for the army).

Smith's enthusiasm was re ignited and he planned to ride in the 2005 Pre 65 SSDT -declaring he intended to win. Sadly this was not to be as he suffered a stroke in October 2004 at home in Suffolk. Smith fought a brave fight but succumbed to a second stroke on October 6, 2004. Smith has three children, Paul, Karen and Amanda and they travelled to the 2005 Pre 65 SSDT, where, joined by many friends of Smith, scattered some of his ashes on the infamous 'Devil's Staircase' section.

== International Trials Championship career ==
Year	Class	Machine	Rd 1	Rd 2	Rd 3	Rd 4	Rd 5	Rd 6	Rd 7	Rd 8	Rd 9	Points	Pos	Notes
1964	FIM Challenge Henry Groutars	Greeves	BEL; 3	FRA; 1	GER; 1							70	1st	Henry Groutars champion
1965	FIM Challenge Henry Groutars	Greeves	FRA; 5	BEL; 21								19	8th	
1966	FIM Challenge Henry Groutars	Greeves	GER -	FRA; 2	BEL; 1							47	2nd	
1967	FIM Challenge Henry Groutars	Greeves	SWI; 1	BEL; 1	GER; 2	FRA; 3						92	1st	Henry Groutars champion
1968	FIM Challenge Henry Groutars	Montesa	SWI; 3	GER -	BEL -	FRA -	GBR; 4					7	6th	
1969	FIM European Championship	Montesa	SUI; 2	FRA; 5	GER; 2	BEL; 1	GBR; 2	SWE; 6				51	1st	FIM European champion
1970	FIM European Championship	Montesa	GER; 4	FRA -	GBR; 6	BEL; 3	IRL -	SPA; 10	FIN -	SWE -	POL -	24	8th	

== Honors ==
- Challenge Henry Groutars Trials Champion 1964, 1967 (later to become the World Championship)
- European Trials Champion 1969

== Related Reading ==
- FIM Trial European Championship
- FIM Trial World Championship

Ride It The Complete Book Of Motorcycle Trials ( Don Smith) Ride It The Complete Book of BMX
