= Albert Cabestany =

Spanish motorcycle racer

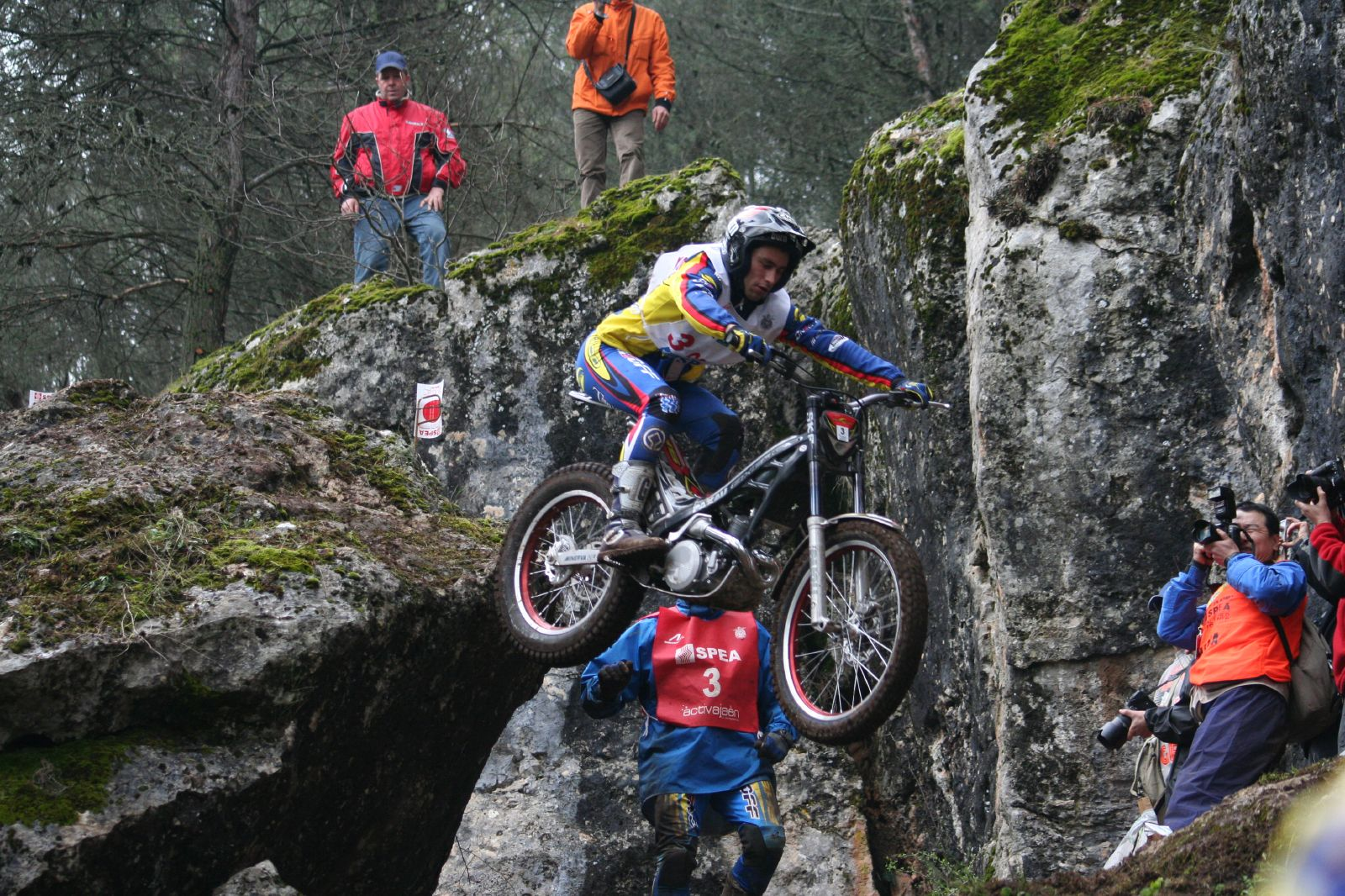
- Albert Cabestany 2007
- Nationality: Spanish
- Born: 26 June 1980 (age 46); Tarragona, Spain
- Current team: factory gasgas team manager

Albert Cabestany (born 26 June 1980 in Tarragona, Spain), is an International motorcycle trials rider. He was Spanish Outdoor Trials Champion in 2002, and Indoor Champion in 2002, 2003 and 2006.

== Biography ==
Cabestany competed in his first international competition in 1997 at the age of 16, riding his Beta in the Portuguese round of the FIM Trial European Championship and finishing in eighth place. At the second round in Spain, he narrowly missed the podium with a fourth-place finish. After competing for the full season, he ended the year seventh in the standings. He also rode in the Spanish round of the FIM Trial World Championship scoring two points for a 14th-place finish.

In 2002, Cabestany took the Spanish Championship Title after a season long battle with Adam Raga. It came down to the final round in Terrassa, with Cabestany finishing second and Raga finishing fourth, giving Cabestany the title with 131 points to 129 for the season.

== European Trials Championship career ==
Year	Team	Class	1	2	3	4	5	6	Points	Rank
1997	Beta	Pro	POR; 8	SPA; 4	FRA; 6	POL; 9	ITA; 13	GER; 5	52	7th
1998	Beta	Pro	SPA; 2	POR; 5	POL; 1	ITA; 9	FRA; 2	GER; 2	89	2nd

== World Trials Championship career ==
Year	Team	1	2	3	4	5	6	7	8	9	10	11	12	13	14	15	16	17	18	19	20	Points	Rank
1997	Beta	SPA; 14	SPA -	LUX -	LUX -	BEL -	BEL -	RSM -	RSM -	ITA -	ITA -	FRA -	FRA -	AND -	AND -	USA -	USA -	CZE -	CZE -	GER -	GER -	2	21st
1998	Beta	SPA; 12	SPA; 15	GBR; 15	GBR; 13	RSM; 15	RSM; 12	CZE; 9	CZE -	GER -	GER -	FRA; 13	FRA; 13	AND; 14	AND; 6	FIN; 13	FIN -	NOR; 8	NOR -			50	14th
1999	Gas-Gas	SPA; 9	SPA; 8	POR; 8	POR; 4	BEL; 10	BEL; 15	GBR; 9	GBR; 6	GER; 2	GER; 2	FRA; 6	FRA; 14	USA; 7	USA; 9	USA; 9	USA; 7	SUI; 14	SUI; 13	ITA; 6	ITA; 3	168	8th
2000	Beta	SPA; 9	SPA; 7	POR; 4	POR; 8	BEL; 10	BEL; 7	GBR; 6	GBR; 7	CZE -	CZE -	GER; 8	GER; 10	JAP; 8	JAP -	FRA; 13	FRA; 4	ITA; 1	ITA; 2	AND; 9	AND; 5	164	6th
2001	Beta	SPA; 4	SPA; 8	POR; 7	POR; 7	BEL; 8	BEL; 6	JAP; 8	JAP; 7	USA; 5	USA; 4	ITA; 10	ITA; 5	FRA; 11	FRA; 8	AND; 14	AND; 7	CZE; 3	CZE; 3			169	7th
2002	Beta	SPA; 3	SPA; 3	GBR; 3	GBR; 4	USA; 4	USA; 5	AND; 1	AND; 5	FRA; 1	FRA; 2	ITA; 5	ITA; 3	FRA; 6	FRA; 4	JAP; 11	JAP; 7					213	3rd
2003	Beta	IRL; 7	IRL; 3	LUX -	LUX -	GER; 6	GER; 9	JAP -	JAP -	AND; 9	AND; 8	SPA; 6	SPA; 1	ITA; 5	ITA; 3	FRA; 4	FRA; 4	EUR; 4	EUR; 5			162	7th
2004	Beta	IRL; 3	IRL; 2	POR; 4	POR; 4	JAP; 8	JAP; 8	USA; 5	USA; 4	FRA; 4	FRA; 4	AND; 3	ITA; 5	ITA; 6	SPA; 5	SUI; 5	SUI; 5					195	4th
2005	Sherco	POR; 3	SPA; 2	JAP; 3	JAP; 1	USA; 6	USA; 2	AND; 3	FRA; 3	FRA; 2	ITA; 3	ITA; 9	GBR; 3	GER; 5	GER; 6	BEL; 5						210	4th
2006	Sherco	SPA; 4	POR; 6	USA; 5	USA; 4	JAP; 3	JAP; 1	FRA; 5	FRA; 2	POL; 3	GBR; 3	AND; 1	BEL; 2									177	3rd
2007	Sherco	SPA; 5	GUA; 5	GUA; 7	FRA; 5	JAP; 4	JAP; 4	ITA; 5	POL; 3	CZE; 3	GBR; 4	AND; 4										135	4th
2008	Sherco	IRL; 5	IRL; 4	USA; 3	USA; 7	JAP; 7	JAP; 7	FRA; 6	ITA; 4	CZE; 4	SWE; 7	POR; 5	SPA; 5									133	5th
2009	Sherco	IRL; 4	IRL; 3	POR; 3	GBR; 5	GBR; 3	JAP; 7	JAP; 8	ITA; 5	AND; 7	SPA; 5	FRA; 5										128	5th
2010	Sherco	SPA; 5	POR; 2	POR; 2	JAP; 7	JAP; 5	JAP; 7	GBR; 6	GBR; 2	FRA; 4	RSM; 3	ITA; 7	CZE; 4									142	5th
2011	Sherco	GER; 2	FRA; 4	FRA; 2	SPA; 3	AND; 4	ITA; 5	GBR; 4	JAP -	JAP -	FRA; 3	FRA; 3										129	4th
2012	Sherco	FRA; 3	FRA; 3	AUS; 3	AUS; 5	JAP; 3	JAP; 2	SPA; 2	SPA; 7	AND; 5	AND; 1	ITA; 3	GBR; 6	GBR; 5								181	4th
2013	Sherco	JAP; 3	JAP; 6	USA; 4	USA; 5	AND; 3	AND; 3	SPA; 3	ITA; 5	CZE; 3	GBR; 5	GBR; 5	FRA; 5	FRA; 2								170	4th
2014	Sherco	AUS; 6	AUS; 4	JAP; 4	JAP; 3	EUR -	EUR; 3	ITA; 3	BEL; 3	GBR; 3	GBR; 7	FRA; 4	SPA; 2	SPA; 4								163	3rd
2015	Sherco	JAP; 5	JAP; 5	CZE; 3	CZE; 6	SWE; 5	SWE; 3	GBR; 3	GBR; 4	FRA; 4	FRA; 5	AND; 4	AND; 3	USA; 4	USA; 4	POR; 5	POR; 3	SPA; 3	SPA; 4			233	4th
2016	Sherco	SPA; 1	SPA; 7	JAP; 5	JAP; 4	GER; 3	GER; 11	AND; 5	AND; 5	FRA; 10	FRA; 5	BEL; 3	GBR; 4	GBR; 3	ITA; 4	ITA; 4						181	4th
2017	Sherco	SPA; 3	JAP; 8	JAP; 3	AND; 7	FRA; 6	GBR; 8	USA; 6	USA; 6	CZE; 6	ITA; 9											102	6th

== Related Reading ==
- FIM Trial European Championship
- FIM Trial World Championship
- Scottish Six Days Trial
