= Sara Trentini =

Italian motorcycle racer

- Nationality: Italian
- Born: 24 June 1991 (age 35); Riva Del Garda, Italy
- Current team: Vertigo
- Website: offroadpark.it

Sara Trentini (born 24 June 1991 in Riva Del Garda, Italy), is an Italian Women's International motorcycle trials rider. Trentini is a 5 times Italian Women's Trials Champion, winning the National title in 2010 thru 2012, and again in 2016 and 2017.

== Biography ==
Trentini first competed in the Italian Women's Trials Championship in 2006, finishing in fifth place. In 2007, she repeated the finish of fifth, and in 2008, finished a creditable third place in the championship behind champion Martina Balducchi and Michela Bonnin. Trentini competed on the international circuit during 2008 as a member of the Italian Women's Trial Des Nations team in Andorra alongside Balducchi and Bonnin. She also competed in the European Championships, placing 18th.

In 2009, Trentini was once again a member of the Italian TDN team, and finished runner-up in the Italian Championship, once more behind Martina Balducchi. She took charge of the 2010 championship taking her first Italian title ahead of TDN teammate Balducchi. A step up into the FIM Women's World Championship produced a 15th-place finished at the end of the season, with a best finish of 12th in Poland.

The Italian title was successfully defended in 2011, once more ahead of Balducchi after the title race went down to the last round at Lazzate. The pair started the final round even on points, Trentini took the win and with it the title. In 2012, Trentini made it three titles in a row, though had to give up second best to Balducchi in 2013. The World Championships proved more fruitful for Trentini after finishing in 8th place, her best finish to date.

2015 saw Trentini finish an excellent second place in the FIM Trial European Championship behind German rider Theresa Bauml, after winning the opening round held in Italy. She topped off the season with runner-up spot in the Italian championships.

== National Trials Championship Career ==
Year	Class	Machine	Rd 1	Rd 2	Rd 3	Rd 4	Rd 5	Rd 6	Rd 7	Rd 8	Rd 9	Points	Pos	Notes
2006	(Italy) Italian Women's	Gas Gas	GIA; 5	SON; 4	GAR; 5	CRO; 5						46	5th	
2007	(Italy) Italian Women's	Sherco	CAM; 4	BAR; 5	VIL; 6	POL; 6	BAR; 4	MON; 6	FOP; 1	GRO; 4		105	5th	
2008	(Italy) Italian Women's	Beta	GVP; 3	BAL; 4	CHI; 3	REC; 3	BAR; 4	GUA; 1	SES; 4	BRA; 1		137	3rd	
2009	(Italy) Italian Women's	Gas Gas	LOA; 2	CET; 1	ARN; 2	SCO; 1	COU; 3	APR; 2	MAG; 2			146	2nd	member of Italian Women's Trial des Nations team
2010	(Italy) Italian Women's	Beta	LOA; 1	SAN; 2	MON; 1	CRO; 1	MOR; 1	BER; 1				117	1st	Italian Women's Champion
2011	(Italy) Italian Women's	Beta	GIA; 1	BAR; 1	MON -	STS; 2	POZ; 2	APR; 1				94	1st	Italian Women's Champion
2012	(Italy) Italian Women's	Beta	OLI; 1	CRE; 1	BRA; 1	MON; 1	LAN; 1	BER; 2				117	1st	Italian Women's Champion
2013	(Italy) Italian Women's	Beta	BOS; 2	CAM; 1	DBT; 1	MON -	CHI; 1	SPM; 2	PDF; 1	ALA; 1	DBT; 1	154	2nd	
2016	(Italy) Italian Women's	Beta	GIA; 1	TOL; 2	BOA; 1	ABE; 1	TER; 1	VER; 1	SPO; 1			137	1st	Italian Women's Champion
2017	(Italy) Italian Women's	Beta	GIA; 1	TOL; 1	BOA; 1	ABE; 1	TER; 1	VER; 2	SPO; 1			137	1st	Italian Women's Champion

== International Trials Championship Career ==
Year	Class	Machine	Rd 1	Rd 2	Rd 3	Rd 4	Rd 5	Points	Pos	Notes
2008	FIM Women's European Championship	Beta	FRA -	ITA; 15	CZE -			1	18th	
2009	FIM Women's European Championship	Gas Gas	POL -	ITA; 8	CZE -			8	10th	
2010	FIM Women's World Championship	Beta	FRA; 15	CZE -	POL; 12			5	15th	
2011	FIM Women's European Championship	Beta	ITA; 6	GER; 14	CZE; 15			13	9th	
2011	FIM Women's World Championship	Beta	GER -	CZE -	ITA; 15			1	21st	
2012	FIM Women's European Championship	Beta	ITA; 6	CZE; 5	NED; 6			31	5th	
2012	FIM Women's World Championship	Beta	AND; 8	AND; 9	SWI; 11	SWI; 15	SWI; 12	20	10th	
2013	FIM Women's European Championship	Beta	CZE; 3	NOR; 5	SWE; 3			200	3rd	
2013	FIM Women's World Championship	Beta	AND; 6	AND; 12	FRA; 15	FRA; 10	FRA; 8	24	8th	
2014	FIM Women's European Championship	Ossa	ITA; 2	POL; 3	POL; 5	BEL -		210	5th	
2014	FIM Women's World Championship	Ossa	BEL; 4	SPA; 13	SPA; 13	AND -		19	10th	
2015	FIM Women's European Championship	Sherco	ITA; 2	POL; 3	POL; 2			210	5th	
2015	FIM Women's World Championship	Sherco	CZE; 12	CZE; 9	SPA; 12	SPA; 9	SPA; 13	18	11th	
2016	FIM Women's European Championship	Beta	ITA; 2	POL; 2	POL; 5	GER; 6		275	3rd	
2016	FIM Women's World Championship	Beta	GBR; 10	GBR; 11	ITA; 7	ITA; 9	FRA; 11	27	9th	
2017	FIM Women's World Championship	Beta	USA; 10	USA; 10	CZE; 13	ITA; 13		18	12th	

== Honors ==
- Italian Women's Trials Champion 2010, 2011, 2012, 2016, 2017

== Related Reading ==
- FIM Trial European Championship
- FIM Trial World Championship
