= Donna Fox =

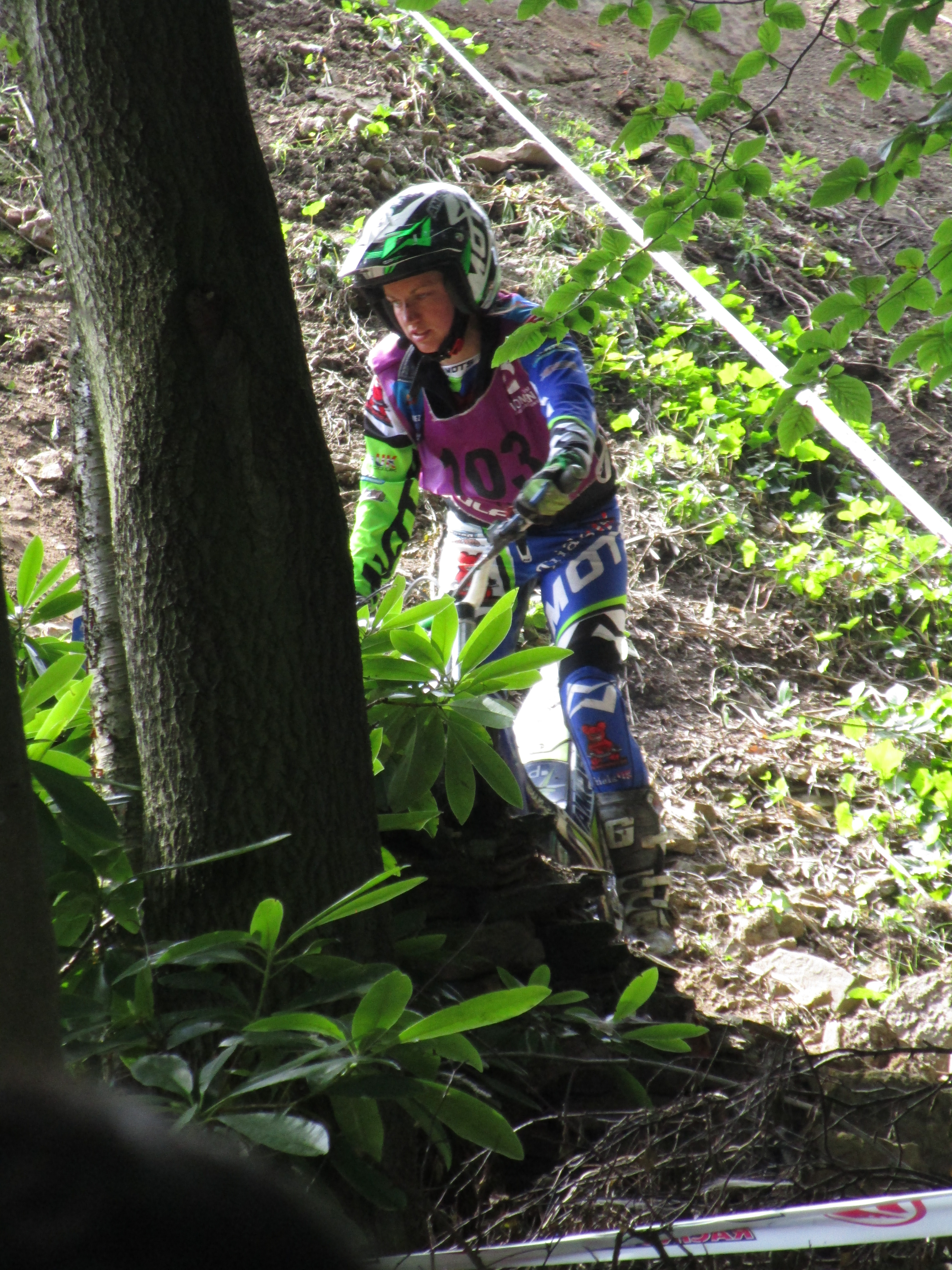
- Fox riding at the British World round - July 2016.
- Nationality: (United Kingdom) British
- Born: 22 October 1984 (age 42); Doncaster, England
- Current team: Sherco

Donna Fox (born 22 October 1984) is a British Women's International motorcycle trials rider. Fox was a member of the winning British Women's TDN team in 2006–2007 and 2015.

== Biography ==
Fox finished runner up to Maria Conway in the inaugural British Women's Trials Championship in 2002, losing out by a mere 5 points. That year she made her international debut competing in both the FIM Women's World Trials Championship and as a member of the British team at the annual FIM Trial Des Nations, held in Portugal. She placed 6th in the World Championships.

In 2005 Fox was again runner up in the British Championship, this time to TDN teammate Rebekah Cook. She rode with Cook again in 2006 as a member of the British TDN Team along with Maria Conway and lifted her first major silverware as the British Women's team took the title in France ahead of a strong Spanish team. The British team composed of the same riders repeated the victory in 2007 when the TDN was held on the Isle of Man, this time heading off the German team.

Fox continued to ride in both the British and World rounds for the following years, finishing runner up once again to Cook in 2009 and taking 3rd spot in 2011, 2012, 2013 and 2015. 2015 also saw Fox return to the British TDN team where, alongside teammates Emma Bristow and Rebekah Cook they won the event, this time held in Spain. The trio of British riders also stole the show in the FIM Women's World Championships with Bristow taking the title followed by Cook and Fox taking a career best 3rd in the championship.

== National Trials Championship Career ==
Year	Class	Machine	Rd 1	Rd 2	Rd 3	Rd 4	Rd 5	Rd 6	Rd 7	Rd 8	Points	Pos	Notes
2005	(United Kingdom) British Women's	Sherco	MIT; 1	WOE; 2	MCK; 3	IRE; 2	LOC; 2	BRA; 2			88	2nd	
2011	(United Kingdom) British Women's	Sherco	MOO; 3	SCA; 3	LIN; 3	SOU; 4	MAN; 3	YEA; 4	RIC; 3		88	3rd	
2012	(United Kingdom) British Women's	Beta	LOC; 3	DIR; 3	SCA; 3	WES -	MCK; 3	ESW; 3			75	3rd	
2013	(United Kingdom) British Women's	Sherco	COL; 3	CHR; 3	VIC; 3	WAI; 4	AST; 3	POW; 4	IOM; 3		88	3rd	
2015	(United Kingdom) British Women's	Sherco	NBE; 3	LUT; 2	ZON; 2	ZON; 3	MAN; 3	IOM; 3	IOM; 3		94	3rd	
2017	(United Kingdom) British Women's	Sherco	NBE; 6	SOU; 4	TOR; 6	BEX; 6	NOE; 7	NOE; 7			52	6th	
2019	(United States) NATC Women's Pro	Montesa	NE; 2	NE -	MN -	MN -	CO -	CO -	OR -	OR -	25	4th	

== International Trials Championship Career ==
Year	Class	Machine	Rd 1	Rd 2	Rd 3	Rd 4	Rd 5	Points	Pos	Notes
2002	FIM World Women's	Sherco	POR; 6					10	6th	
2003	FIM European Women's	Sherco	FRA; 5	ITA; 6	RSM; 9			28	5th	
2003	FIM World Women's	Sherco	RSM; 9					7	9th	
2004	FIM European Women's	Sherco	FRA; 5	GBR; 9	SPA; 3			22	4th	
2004	FIM World Women's	Sherco	SPA; 6	SPA; 13				13	9th	
2005	FIM European Women's	Sherco	ITA; 6	NOR; 9	ITA; 8			26	7th	
2005	FIM World Women's	Sherco	ITA; 14	ITA; 3				17	7th	
2006	FIM European Women's	Sherco	FRA; 6	ITA; 5	SPA; 5			32	5th	
2006	FIM World Women's	Sherco	AND; 5	BEL; 7	FRA; 4			24	5th	
2007	FIM European Women's	Sherco	SPA; 6	ITA; 6	NOR; 5			31	5th	
2007	FIM World Women's	Sherco	CZE; 4	BEL -	GBR; 4			26	4th	
2008	FIM European Women's	Sherco	FRA; 7	ITA; 5	CZE; 5			31	5th	
2008	FIM World Women's	Sherco	LUX; 5	SPA; 4	AND; 10			24	4th	
2011	FIM European Women's	Beta	ITA -	GER; 4	CZE; 9			20	7th	
2011	FIM World Women's	Gas Gas	GER; 5	CZE; 7	ITA -			20	7th	
2012	FIM World Women's	Beta	AND -	AND -	SWI; 6	SWI; 6	SWI; 6	30	6th	
2015	FIM World Women's	Sherco	CZE; 4	CZE; 5	SPA; 4	SPA; 3	SPA; 2	45	3rd	
2016	FIM World Women's	Sherco	GBR; 7	GBR; 10	ITA; 5	ITA; 2	FRA; 4	50	5th	
2018	FIM World Women's	Montesa	JAP -	JAP -	FRA -	GBR; 4		13	12th	

== Honors ==
- British Women's Trial Des Nations Winning Team Member 2006, 2007, 2015, 2016, 2018
