= Tommi Ahvala =

Finnish motorcycle racer

- Nationality: (Finland) Finnish
- Born: November 13, 1971 (age 55); Helsinki, Finland
- Current team: Retired
- Website: Tommi Ahvala Supertrial site

Tommi Ahvala (born November 13, 1971) is a Finnish former world champion motorcycle trials rider. He won the 1992 World Motorcycle Trials Championship and the 1993 Indoor Trials World Championship.

== Biography ==
Born in Helsinki, Finland, Ahvala began practicing trial as a hobby at the age of six in his backyard. He participated in the first competition at the age of ten. When he was 15, he began to compete internationally and he participated in the World Trial Championship for the first time in 1988. He was not yet an adult, so when competing in Finland he had to use a 125-cc motorcycle, and when abroad a 250 cc one. He was granted a special driving permission at the age of 17.

In 1989, Ahvala finished in sixth place at the World Championship, fourth in 1990, and second in 1991. He also won the gold medal in 1990 and 1991 in the Finnish Championship, which he then left due to lack of time. In 1992, Ahvala won the World Motorcycle Trials Championship. The following year he won the indoor title.

In 1995, Ahvala was the first foreigner to win the Italian Trials Championship.

In 1998, Ahvala was hired by the Spanish motorcycle manufacturer Gas Gas to compete in the United States. He competed in the A.M.A. National Championship in 1998 and 1999, winning the 1999 title. Afterwards, he began teaching in a series of trials schools, in an effort to raise the level of competitiveness, as well as the level of public awareness of the sport in the United States.

Finland printed a postage stamp in Ahvala's honor in 1995.

== International Trials Championship career ==
Year	Class	Machine	Rd 1	Rd 2	Rd 3	Rd 4	Rd 5	Rd 6	Rd 7	Rd 8	Rd 9	Rd 10	Rd 11	Rd 12	Points	Pos	Notes
1988	FIM World Championship	Aprilia	SPA -	GBR -	IRL -	LUX; 13	GER -	AUT; 11	FRA; 13	BEL; 11	ITA; 14	SWE; 11	FIN; 4	POL; 13	39	13th	
1989	FIM World Championship	Aprilia	GBR; 7	IRL; 9	ITA; 13	USA; 4	CAN; 7	FRA; 8	SWI; 6	SPA; 6	AUT; 4	CZE; 6	GER; 2	LUX; 7	118	6th	
1990	FIM World Championship	Aprilia	IRL; 3	GBR; 3	USA; 3	CAN; 3	BEL; 4	GER; 4	SWE; 4	FIN; 6	SPA; 2	ITA; 5	POL; 3	SWI; 3	167	4th	
1991	FIM World Championship	Aprilia	LUX; 5	GBR; 4	IRL; 2	BEL; 2	FRA; 7	SPA; 4	POL; 2	AUT; 4	ITA; 2	FIN; 1	SWE; 4	CZE; 1	180	2nd	
1992	FIM World Championship	Aprilia	SPA; 1	BEL; 2	GBR; 3	IRL; 2	FRA; 1	AND; 11	CZE; 2	POL; 2	GER; 2	ITA; 2	CAN; 1	USA; 2	199	1st	World Champion
1993	FIM World Championship	Aprilia	LUX; 3	BEL; 2	GER; 7	CZE; 3	POL; 6	ITA; 6	FRA; 3	AND; 1	SPA; 7	SWE; 3	FIN; 4	GBR; 4	161	3rd	
1994	FIM World Championship	Fantic	IRL; 2	GBR; 6	BEL; 1	GER; 13	CZE; 2	FRA; 4	USA; 3	SPA; 2	ITA; 5	SWI; 2			140	2nd	
1995	FIM World Championship	Fantic	LUX; 1	GBR; 3	IRL; 4	BEL; 7	POL; 4	ITA; 6	SPA; 3	FRA; 3	AND; 9	FIN; 4			130	3rd	
1996	FIM World Championship	Fantic	SPA; 9	GBR; 9	IRL -	USA; 14	CAN; 6	FRA; 11	ITA; 10	GER; 5	CZE; 6	BEL; 7			67	8th	

== Honors ==
- FIM World Trials Champion 1992
- Finnish Trials Champion 1989, 1990, 1991, 2005
- Italian Trials Champion 1995
- US NATC Trials Champion 1999
- Best sportsman in the metropolitan area in 1991 (elected by the sportswriters of Helsinki)
- Driver Badges awarded by Finnish Motorcycling Federation :
  - Bronze driver badge in 1986
  - Silver driver badge in 1986
  - Masterdriver badge in 1990
  - Masterdriver badge with grandmaster symbols in 1991
- Honorary Member of Canzo, Italy, in 1992
