= Alexz Wigg =

British motorcycle racer

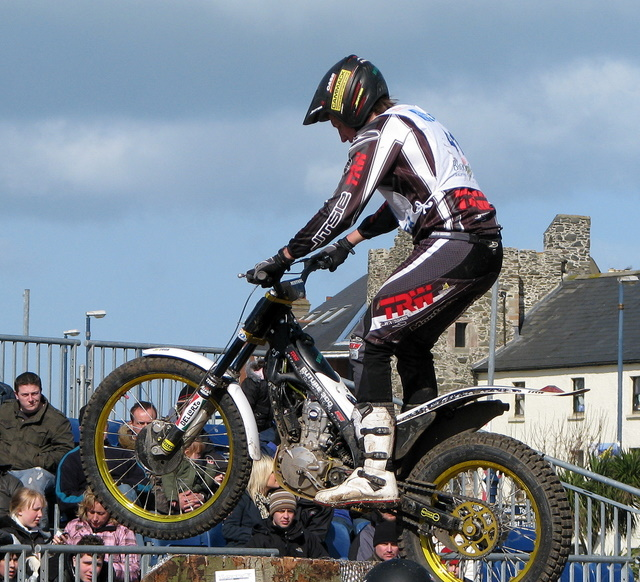
- 2008 SPEA FIM European Trial Motorcycle Championship, Bangor
- Nationality: (United Kingdom) British
- Born: 11 November 1989 (age 37); Aylesbury, Buckinghamshire, England
- Current team: Gas-Gas
- Website: Alexz Wigg official site

Alexz Wigg (born 11 November 1989), is an English International motorcycle trials rider.

== Biography ==
Born in Aylesbury, United Kingdom, Wigg started riding at 4 years of age. He progressed through the schoolboy trials ranks and was European Youth Champion in 2004. For 2006 Wigg rode a Gas Gas motorcycle and contested the Youth World Championships and European Junior Championships, emerging as winner of both titles. 2007 saw him finish runner up in the Junior World Championships. For the 2008 season he was again runner-up in the Junior World Championship, and that year also in the Junior European Championship. Wigg finally clinched the Junior World title in 2010, along with the European Title and a win at the famous Scottish Six Days Trial. In 2011 he switched to riding for the Sherco factory team, contesting the FIM Trial World Championship. He hit problems mid-season and in 2012 he went back to riding in the world championships for the Gas Gas factory.

== International Trials Championship Career ==
Year	Class	Machine	Rd 1	Rd 2	Rd 3	Rd 4	Rd 5	Rd 6	Rd 7	Rd 8	Rd 9	Rd 10	Rd 11	Rd 12	Rd 13	Points	Pos	Notes
2006	FIM European Junior Championship	Gas Gas	SPA; 2	POR; 3	FRA; 1	ITA; 1	POL; 1	CZE; 3								107	1st	European Junior Champion
2007	FIM European Championship	Gas Gas	SPA; 15	FRA; 15	ITA; 15	POL; 10	NOR -									9	17th	
2008	FIM European Championship	Montesa	IRL; 4	ITA -	POL; 2	CZE; 2	SWE; 2	POR; 1								84	2nd	
2009	FIM European Championship	Beta	POR; 10	ITA; 3	POL; 1	CZE; 3	SPA; 2									73	3rd	
2009	FIM World Championship	Beta	IRL -	IRL -	POR -	GBR -	GBR -	JAP -	JAP -	ITA -	AND -	SPA; 10	FRA; 11			11	14th	
2010	FIM European Championship	Beta	ITA; 2	SPA; 4	POL; 1	AND; 2	ITA; 3	CZE; 1								97	1st	European Champion
2010	FIM World Championship	Beta	SPA; 12	POR; 13	POR; 12	JAP; 12	JAP; 12	GBR; 10	GBR; 10	FRA; 14	RSM; 12	ITA; 11	CZE; 9			49	12th	
2011	FIM World Championship	Sherco	GER; 13	FRA; 12	FRA; 11	SPA; 11	AND; 10	ITA; 15	GBR -	JAP -	JAP -	FRA -	FRA -			24	12th	
2012	FIM World Championship	Gas Gas	FRA; 13	FRA; 12	AUS; 13	AUS; 13	JAP; 8	JAP; 14	SPA; 12	SPA; 10	AND; 11	AND; 13	ITA; 14	GBR; 10	GBR; 8	57	11th	
2014	FIM World Championship	Gas Gas	AUS; 12	AUS; 11	JAP; 12	JAP -	EUR -	EUR; 12	ITA; 13	BEL; 12	GBR; 10	GBR; 13	FRA; 11	SPA; 13	SPA; 13	44	12th	

== Honors ==
- FIM European Youth Champion 2004
- FIM European Junior Champion 2006
- FIM European Champion 2010

== Related Reading ==
- FIM Trial European Championship
- FIM Trial World Championship
- Scottish Six Days Trial
