= FIM Trial World Championship =

Motorcycle trials world championship

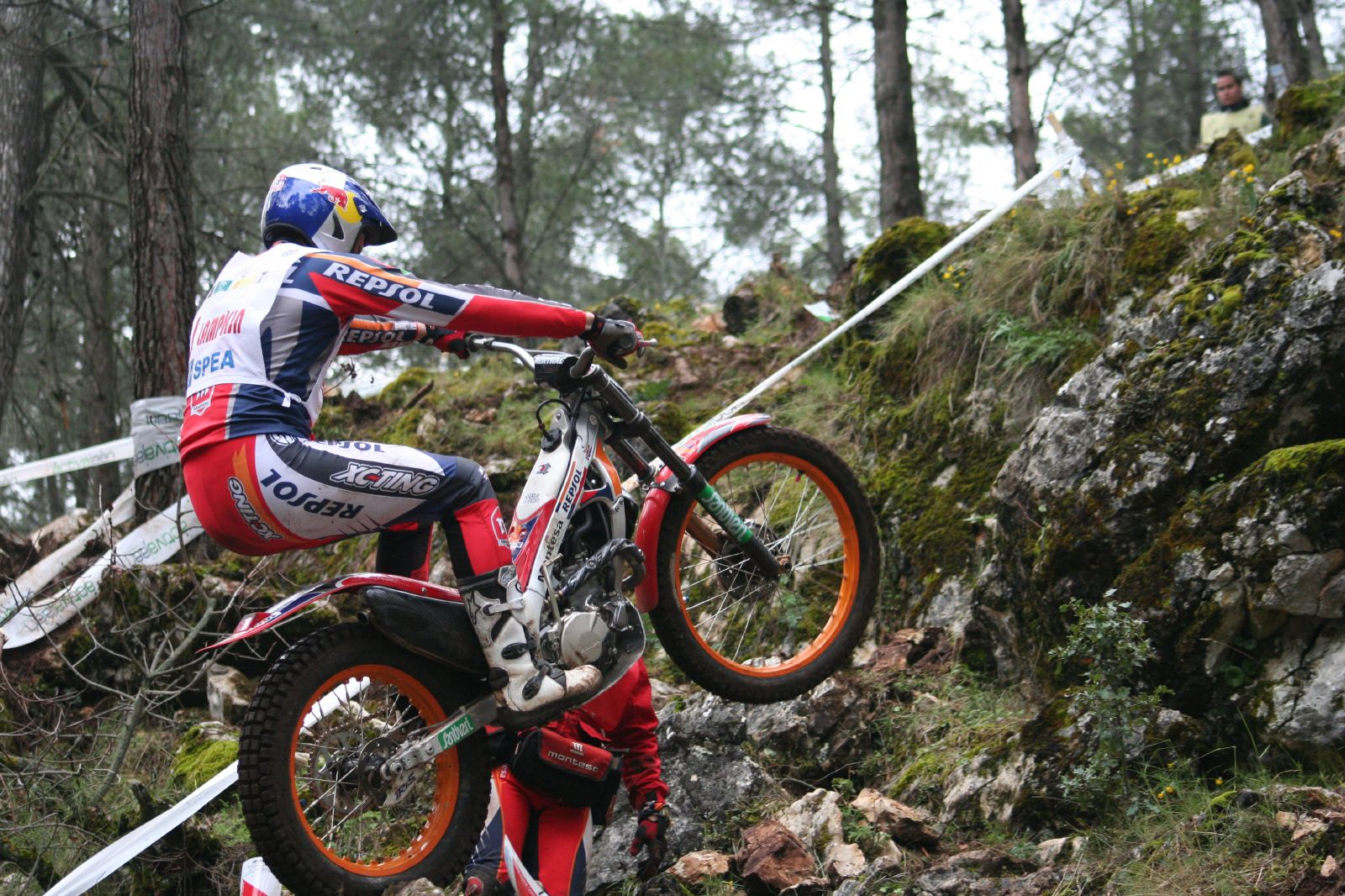
Dougie Lampkin at the Spanish round in 2007

The FIM Trial World Championship and FIM X-Trial World Championship are the most prestigious motorcycle trials tournaments of the world, organised by the Fédération Internationale de Motocyclisme. The outdoor championship is held since 1964 and the indoor (X-Trial) since 1993.

From 1964 to 1967 the championship was named Challenge Henry Groutars. From 1968 to 1974, it was the Trial European Championship, and from 1975 onwards it has been known as the World Championship.

Up until 2010, the outdoor world trial championship has been won by 6 different pilots from the UK, 5 from Spain, 2 from Finland and France, and 1 from Belgium, Germany, United States, Japan and Sweden. Since 2005, only Spanish pilots have won the outdoor and the indoor world trial championships.

== World Trials Champions ==
"Note: Green background denotes Challenge Henry Groutars" "Note: Pink background denotes European Championship."

Year	Outdoor Series	—N/a			
1964	1) (United Kingdom) Don Smith (Greeves); 2) (Germany) Gustav Franke(Zundapp); 3) (Germany) Andreas Brandl (Zundapp)	—N/a			
1965	1) (Germany) Gustav Franke (Zundapp); 2) (Germany) Andreas Brandl (Zundapp); 3) (Germany) Gunter Sengfelder (Zundapp)	—N/a			
1966	1) (Germany) Gustav Franke (Zundapp); 2) (United Kingdom) Don Smith (Greeves); 3) (United Kingdom) Sammy Miller (Bultaco)	—N/a			
1967	1) (United Kingdom) Don Smith (Greeves); 2) (Germany) Gustav Franke (Zundapp); 3) (Germany) Andreas Brandl (Zundapp)	—N/a			
1968	1) (United Kingdom) Sammy Miller (Bultaco); 2) (Germany) Gustav Franke (Zundapp); 3) (United Kingdom) Bill Wilkinson (Greeves)	—N/a			
1969	1) (United Kingdom) Don Smith (Montesa); 2) (United Kingdom) Denis Jones (Suzuki); 3) (United Kingdom) Sammy Miller (Bultaco)	—N/a			
1970	1) (United Kingdom) Sammy Miller (Bultaco); 2) (United Kingdom) Gordon Farley (Montesa); 3) (United Kingdom) Laurence Telling (Montesa)	—N/a			
1971	1) (United Kingdom) Mick Andrews (Ossa); 2) (United Kingdom) Malcolm Rathmell (Bultaco); 3) (United Kingdom) Gordon Farley (Montesa)	—N/a			
1972	1) (United Kingdom) Mick Andrews (Ossa); 2) (United Kingdom) Malcolm Rathmell (Bultaco); 3) (United Kingdom) Martin Lampkin (Bultaco)	—N/a			
1973	1) (United Kingdom) Martin Lampkin (Bultaco); 2) (United Kingdom) Mick Andrews (Yamaha); 3) (United Kingdom) Malcolm Rathmell (Bultaco)	—N/a			
1974	1) (United Kingdom) Malcolm Rathmell (Bultaco); 2) (Sweden) Ulf Karlsson (Montesa); 3) (United Kingdom) Mick Andrews (Yamaha)	—N/a			
1975	1) (United Kingdom) Martin Lampkin (Bultaco); 2) (Finland) Yrjö Vesterinen (Bultaco); 3) (United Kingdom) Malcolm Rathmell (Montesa)	—N/a			
1976	1) (Finland) Yrjö Vesterinen (Bultaco); 2) (United Kingdom) Malcolm Rathmell (Montesa); 3) (United Kingdom) Martin Lampkin (Bultaco)	—N/a			
1977	1) (Finland) Yrjö Vesterinen (Bultaco); 2) (Sweden) Ulf Karlsson (Montesa); 3) (United Kingdom) Malcolm Rathmell (Montesa)	—N/a			
1978	1) (Finland) Yrjö Vesterinen (Bultaco); 2) (United Kingdom) Martin Lampkin (Bultaco); 3) (United States) Bernie Schreiber (Bultaco)	—N/a			
1979	1) (United States) Bernie Schreiber (Bultaco); 2) (Finland) Yrjö Vesterinen (Bultaco); 3) (Sweden) Ulf Karlsson (Montesa)	—N/a			
1980	1) (Sweden) Ulf Karlsson (Montesa); 2) (United States) Bernie Schreiber (Bultaco); 3) (Finland) Yrjö Vesterinen (Montesa)	—N/a			
1981	1) (France) Gilles Burgat (SWM); 2) (Sweden) Ulf Karlsson (Montesa); 3) (Finland) Yrjö Vesterinen (Montesa)	—N/a			
1982	1) (Belgium) Eddy Lejeune (Honda); 2) (United States) Bernie Schreiber (SWM); 3) (France) Gilles Burgat (SWM)	—N/a			
1983	1) (Belgium) Eddy Lejeune (Honda); 2) (United States) Bernie Schreiber (SWM); 3) (France) Thierry Michaud (Honda)	—N/a			
1984	1) (Belgium) Eddy Lejeune (Honda); 2) (France) Thierry Michaud (Fantic); 3) (United States) Bernie Schreiber (SWM)	—N/a			
1985	1) (France) Thierry Michaud (Fantic); 2) (Belgium) Eddy Lejeune (Honda); 3) (United Kingdom) Steve Saunders (Honda)	—N/a			
1986	1) (France) Thierry Michaud (Fantic); 2) (United Kingdom) Steve Saunders (Honda); 3) (Belgium) Eddy Lejeune (Honda)	—N/a			
1987	1) (Spain) Jordi Tarrés (Beta); 2) (Italy) Diego Bosis (Aprilia); 3) (France) Thierry Michaud (Fantic)	—N/a			
1988	1) (France) Thierry Michaud (Fantic); 2) (Spain) Jordi Tarrés (Beta); 3) (Italy) Donato Miglio (Fantic)	—N/a			
1989	1) (Spain) Jordi Tarrés (Beta); 2) (France) Thierry Michaud (Fantic); 3) (Italy) Diego Bosis (Aprilia)	—N/a			
1990	1) (Spain) Jordi Tarrés (Beta); 2) (Italy) Diego Bosis (Aprilia); 3) (Italy) Donato Miglio (Fantic)	—N/a			
1991	1) (Spain) Jordi Tarrés (Beta); 2) (Finland) Tommi Ahvala (Aprilia); 3) (Italy) Diego Bosis (Fantic)	—N/a			
1992	1) (Finland) Tommi Ahvala (Aprilia); 2) (Spain) Marc Colomer (Beta); 3) (Italy) Diego Bosis (Fantic)	—N/a			
Year	Outdoor Series	Indoor Series	—N/a		
1993	1) (Spain) Jordi Tarrés (Gas Gas); 2) (Spain) Marc Colomer (Beta); 3) (Finland) Tommi Ahvala (Aprilia)	1) (Finland) Tommi Ahvala (Aprilia); 2) (Italy) Diego Bosis (Fantic); 3) (Spain) Marc Colomer (Beta)	—N/a		
1994	1) (Spain) Jordi Tarrés (Gas Gas); 2) (Finland) Tommi Ahvala (Fantic); 3) (Spain) Joan Pons (Gas Gas)	1) (Spain) Marc Colomer (Beta); 2) (Spain) Jordi Tarrés (Gas Gas); 3) (Finland) Tommi Ahvala (Fantic)	—N/a		
1995	1) (Spain) Jordi Tarrés (Gas Gas); 2) (Spain) Marc Colomer (Montesa); 3) (Finland) Tommi Ahvala (Fantic)	1) (Spain) Marc Colomer (Beta); 2) (Spain) Jordi Tarrés (Gas Gas); 3) (Finland) Tommi Ahvala (Fantic)	—N/a		
1996	1) (Spain) Marc Colomer (Montesa); 2) (United Kingdom) Dougie Lampkin (Beta); 3) (Spain) Jordi Tarrés (Gas Gas)	1) (Spain) Marc Colomer(Montesa); 2) (Finland) Tommi Ahvala (Fantic); 3) (United Kingdom) Dougie Lampkin (Beta)	—N/a		
1997	1) (United Kingdom) Dougie Lampkin (Beta); 2) (Spain) Marc Colomer (Montesa); 3) (Japan) Kenichi Kuroyama (Beta)	1) (United Kingdom) Dougie Lampkin (Beta); 2) (Spain) Marc Colomer (Montesa); 3) (Spain) Amos Bilbao (Gas Gas)	—N/a		
1998	1) (United Kingdom) Dougie Lampkin (Beta); 2) (Spain) Marc Colomer (Montesa); 3) (Japan) Kenichi Kuroyama (Beta)	1) (United Kingdom) Dougie Lampkin (Beta); 2) (Spain) Marc Colomer (Montesa); 3) (United Kingdom) Steve Colley (Gas Gas)	—N/a		
1999	1) (United Kingdom) Dougie Lampkin (Beta); 2) (Japan) Takahisa Fujinami (Montesa); 3) (Spain) Marc Colomer (Montesa)	1) (United Kingdom) Dougie Lampkin (Beta); 2) (Spain) Marc Colomer (Montesa); 3) (United Kingdom) Steve Colley (Gas Gas)	—N/a		
Year	Outdoor Series	Indoor Series	—N/a	FIM Women's	—N/a
2000	1) (United Kingdom) Dougie Lampkin (Montesa); 2) (Japan) Takahisa Fujinami (Montesa); 3) (Spain) Marc Colomer (Montesa)	1) (United Kingdom) Dougie Lampkin (Beta); 2) (Spain) Marc Colomer (Montesa); 3) (United Kingdom) Steve Colley (Gas Gas)	—N/a	1) (Spain) Laia Sanz (Beta); 2) (Germany) Iris Kramer (Gas Gas); 3) (France) Claire Bertrand (Montesa)	—N/a
2001	1) (United Kingdom) Dougie Lampkin (Montesa); 2) (Japan) Takahisa Fujinami (Montesa); 3) (Spain) Marc Freixa (Sherco)	1) (United Kingdom) Dougie Lampkin (Montesa); 2) (Spain) Marc Freixa (Sherco); 3) (Spain) Marc Colomer (Gas Gas)	—N/a	1) (Spain) Laia Sanz (Beta); 2) (Germany) Iris Kramer (Gas Gas); 3) (France) Claire Bertrand (Montesa)	—N/a
2002	1) (United Kingdom) Dougie Lampkin (Montesa); 2) (Japan) Takahisa Fujinami (Montesa); 3) (Spain) Albert Cabestany (Beta)	1) (Spain) Albert Cabestany (Beta); 2) (United Kingdom) Dougie Lampkin (Montesa); 3) (Spain) Adam Raga (Gas Gas)	—N/a	1) (Spain) Laia Sanz (Beta); 2) (Germany) Iris Kramer (Gas Gas); 3) (France) Claire Bertrand (Gas Gas)	—N/a
2003	1) (United Kingdom) Dougie Lampkin (Montesa); 2) (Japan) Takahisa Fujinami (Montesa); 3) (Spain) Marc Freixa (Montesa)	1) (Spain) Adam Raga (Gas Gas); 2) (United Kingdom) Dougie Lampkin (Montesa); 3) (Spain) Albert Cabestany (Beta)	—N/a	1) (Spain) Laia Sanz (Beta); 2) (Germany) Iris Kramer (Gas Gas); 3) (United Kingdom) Maria Conway (Beta)	—N/a
2004	1) (Japan) Takahisa Fujinami (Montesa); 2) (United Kingdom) Dougie Lampkin (Montesa); 3) (Spain) Adam Raga (Gas Gas)	1) (Spain) Adam Raga (Gas Gas); 2) (Japan) Takahisa Fujinami (Montesa); 3) (United Kingdom) Dougie Lampkin (Montesa)	—N/a	1) (Spain) Laia Sanz (Montesa); 2) (France) Claire Bertrand (Gas Gas); 3) (Germany) Rosita Leotta (Gas Gas)	—N/a
2005	1) (Spain) Adam Raga (Gas Gas); 2) (Japan) Takahisa Fujinami (Montesa); 3) (United Kingdom) Dougie Lampkin (Montesa)	1) (Spain) Adam Raga (Gas Gas); 2) (Spain) Albert Cabestany (Sherco); 3) (Spain) Jeroni Fajardo (Gas Gas)	—N/a	1) (Spain) Laia Sanz (Montesa); 2) (Germany) Iris Kramer (Gas Gas); 3) (Germany) Rosita Leotta (Gas Gas)	—N/a
2006	1) (Spain) Adam Raga (Gas Gas); 2) (Japan) Takahisa Fujinami (Montesa); 3) (Spain) Albert Cabestany (Sherco)	1) (Spain) Adam Raga (Gas Gas); 2) (Spain) Albert Cabestany (Sherco); 3) (Spain) Toni Bou (Beta)	—N/a	1) (Spain) Laia Sanz (Montesa); 2) (Germany) Iris Kramer (Gas Gas); 3) (United Kingdom) Rebekah Cook (Gas Gas)	—N/a
Year	Outdoor Series	Indoor Series	FIM Junior	FIM Women's	—N/a
2007	1) (Spain) Toni Bou (Montesa); 2) (Spain) Adam Raga (Gas Gas); 3) (Japan) Takahisa Fujinami (Montesa)	1) (Spain) Toni Bou (Montesa); 2) (Spain) Adam Raga (Gas Gas); 3) (Spain) Albert Cabestany (Sherco)	1) (United Kingdom) Michael Brown (Beta); 2) (United Kingdom) Alexz Wigg (Gas Gas); 3) (France) Nicolas Gontard (Gas Gas)	1) (Germany) Iris Kramer (Scorpa); 2) (Spain) Laia Sanz (Montesa); 3) (United Kingdom) Rebekah Cook (Gas Gas)	—N/a
2008	1) (Spain) Toni Bou (Montesa); 2) (Spain) Adam Raga (Gas Gas); 3) (Japan) Takahisa Fujinami (Montesa)	1) (Spain) Toni Bou (Montesa); 2) (Spain) Adam Raga (Gas Gas); 3) (Spain) Albert Cabestany (Sherco)	1) (France) Loris Gubian (Sherco); 2) (United Kingdom) Alexz Wigg (Montesa); 3) (Spain) Alfredo Gomez (Montesa)	1) (Spain) Laia Sanz (Montesa); 2) (United Kingdom) Rebekah Cook (Gas Gas); 3) (Germany) Iris Kramer (Scorpa)	—N/a
2009	1) (Spain) Toni Bou (Montesa); 2) (Spain) Adam Raga (Gas Gas); 3) (Japan) Takahisa Fujinami (Montesa)	1) (Spain) Toni Bou (Montesa); 2) (Spain) Albert Cabestany (Sherco); 3) (Spain) Adam Raga (Gas Gas)	1) (United Kingdom) Alexz Wigg (Beta); 2) (Spain) Alfredo Gomez (Montesa); 3) (Italy) Matteo Grattarola (Sherco)	1) (Spain) Laia Sanz (Montesa); 2) (United Kingdom) Rebekah Cook (Gas Gas); 3) (Germany) Iris Kramer (Scorpa)	—N/a
2010	1) (Spain) Toni Bou (Montesa); 2) (Spain) Adam Raga (Gas Gas); 3) (Japan) Takahisa Fujinami (Montesa)	1) (Spain) Toni Bou (Montesa); 2) (Spain) Albert Cabestany (Sherco); 3) (Spain) Adam Raga (Gas Gas)	1) (United Kingdom) Jack Challoner (Beta); 2) (Spain) Alfredo Gomez (Montesa); 3) (France) Alexandre Ferrer (Sherco)	1) (Spain) Laia Sanz (Montesa); 2) (United Kingdom) Rebekah Cook (Sherco); 3) (United Kingdom) Joanne Coles (Gas Gas)	—N/a
2011	1) (Spain) Toni Bou (Montesa); 2) (Spain) Adam Raga (Gas Gas); 3) (Japan) Takahisa Fujinami (Montesa)	1) (Spain) Toni Bou (Montesa); 2) (Spain) Albert Cabestany (Sherco); 3) (Spain) Adam Raga (Gas Gas)	1) (Spain) Alfredo Gomez (Montesa); 2) (Spain) Pol Tarres (Gas Gas); 3) (Spain) Francesc Moret (Montesa)	1) (Spain) Laia Sanz (Montesa); 2) (United Kingdom) Emma Bristow (Ossa); 3) (United Kingdom) Rebekah Cook (Sherco)	—N/a
2012	1) (Spain) Toni Bou (Montesa); 2) (Spain) Adam Raga (Gas Gas); 3) (Spain) Jeroni Fajardo (Beta)	1) (Spain) Toni Bou (Montesa); 2) (Spain) Albert Cabestany (Sherco); 3) (Spain) Adam Raga (Gas Gas)	1) (France) Alexandre Ferrer (Sherco); 2) (Spain) Francesc Moret (Montesa); 3) (France) Benoit Dagnicourt (Beta)	1) (Spain) Laia Sanz (Gas Gas); 2) (United Kingdom) Emma Bristow (Ossa); 3) (Spain) Sandra Gómez (Gas Gas)	—N/a
2013	1) (Spain) Toni Bou (Montesa); 2) (Spain) Adam Raga (Gas Gas); 3) (Spain) Jeroni Fajardo (Beta)	1) (Spain) Toni Bou (Montesa); 2) (Spain) Adam Raga (Gas Gas); 3) (Spain) Albert Cabestany (Sherco)	1) (Spain) Jorge Casales (Gas Gas); 2) (Spain) Pol Tarres (Sherco); 3) (Spain) Francesc Moret (Gas Gas)	1) (Spain) Laia Sanz (Montesa); 2) (United Kingdom) Emma Bristow (Sherco); 3) (United Kingdom) Rebekah Cook (Beta)	—N/a
2014	1) (Spain) Toni Bou (Montesa); 2) (Spain) Adam Raga (Gas Gas); 3) (Spain) Albert Cabestany (Sherco)	1) (Spain) Toni Bou (Montesa); 2) (Spain) Albert Cabestany (Sherco); 3) (Spain) Adam Raga (Gas Gas)	1) (Spain) Jaime Busto (Beta); 2) (Germany) Franz Kadlec (Beta); 3) (France) QC DeCaudemberg (Beta)	1) (United Kingdom) Emma Bristow (Sherco); 2) (United Kingdom) Rebekah Cook (Beta); 3) (Spain) Sandra Gómez (Ossa)	—N/a
2015	1) (Spain) Toni Bou (Montesa); 2) (Spain) Adam Raga (Gas Gas); 3) (Spain) Jeroni Fajardo (Beta)	1) (Spain) Toni Bou (Montesa); 2) (Spain) Adam Raga (Gas Gas); 3) (Spain) Albert Cabestany (Sherco)	1) (France) QC DeCaudemberg (Beta); 2) (Spain) Miquel Gelabert (Sherco); 3) (United Kingdom) Iwan Roberts (Beta)	1) (United Kingdom) Emma Bristow (Sherco); 2) (United Kingdom) Rebekah Cook (JGas); 3) (United Kingdom) Donna Fox (Sherco)	—N/a
Year	Outdoor Series	Indoor Series	FIM Trial 2	FIM Women's	FIM Women's Trial 2
2016	1) (Spain) Toni Bou (Montesa); 2) (Spain) Adam Raga (TRRS); 3) (Japan) Takahisa Fujinami (Montesa)	1) (Spain) Toni Bou (Montesa); 2) (Spain) Adam Raga (TRRS); 3) (Spain) Albert Cabestany (Sherco)	1) (United Kingdom) Jack Price (Gas Gas); 2) (United Kingdom) Iwan Roberts (Beta); 3) (United Kingdom) Dan Peace (Gas Gas)	1) (United Kingdom) Emma Bristow (Sherco); 2) (Spain) Sandra Gómez (Gas Gas); 3) (United Kingdom) Rebekah Cook (TRRS)	—N/a
2017	1) (Spain) Toni Bou (Montesa); 2) (Spain) Adam Raga (TRRS); 3) (Spain) Jaime Busto (Montesa)	1) (Spain) Toni Bou (Montesa); 2) (Spain) Adam Raga (TRRS); 3) (Spain) Jeroni Fajardo (Vértigo)	1) (United Kingdom) Iwan Roberts (Beta); 2) (Spain) Gabriel Marcelli (Montesa); 3) (Spain) Francesc Moret (Montesa)	1) (United Kingdom) Emma Bristow (Sherco); 2) (Spain) Sandra Gómez (Gas Gas); 3) (Germany) Theresa Bauml (Beta)	1) (Spain) Neus Murcia (Beta); 2) (Germany) Jules Teinert (TRRS); 3) (Spain) Carla Caballe (Gas Gas)
2018	1) (Spain) Toni Bou (Montesa); 2) (Spain) Jeroni Fajardo (Gas Gas); 3) (Spain) Adam Raga (TRRS)	1) (Spain) Toni Bou (Montesa); 2) (Spain) Adam Raga (TRRS); 3) (Spain) Jaime Busto (Gas Gas)	1) (Italy) Matteo Grattarola (Honda); 2) (United Kingdom) Toby Martyn (Montesa); 3) (Spain) Gabriel Marcelli (Montesa)	1) (United Kingdom) Emma Bristow (Sherco); 2) (Spain) Berta Abellán (Vértigo); 3) (Spain) Sandra Gómez (Gas Gas)	1) (Italy) Alex Brancati (Beta); 2) (United States) Madeleine Hoover (Gas Gas); 3) (Germany) Sophia Ter Jung (Beta)
2019	1) (Spain) Toni Bou (Montesa); 2) (Spain) Adam Raga (TRRS); 3) (Japan) Takahisa Fujinami (Montesa)	1) (Spain) Toni Bou (Montesa); 2) (Spain) Adam Raga (TRRS); 3) (Spain) Jaime Busto (Gas Gas)	1) (Spain) Gabriel Marcelli (Montesa); 2) (Italy) Matteo Grattarola (Honda); 3) (France) Alexandre Ferrer (Sherco)	1) (United Kingdom) Emma Bristow (Sherco); 2) (Spain) Berta Abellán (Vértigo); 3) (Spain) Sandra Gómez (TRRS)	1) (Germany) Vivien Wachs (TRRS); 2) (United Kingdom) Alice Minta (Scorpa); 3) (France) Caroline Moreon (Sherco)
2020	1) (Spain) Toni Bou (Montesa); 2) (Spain) Adam Raga (TRRS); 3) (Spain) Jaime Busto (Vértigo)	1) (Spain) Toni Bou (Montesa); 2) (Spain) Adam Raga (TRRS); 3) (Spain) Jeroni Fajardo (Sherco)	1) (Italy) Matteo Grattarola (Beta); 2) (France) Alexandre Ferrer (TRRS); 3) (United Kingdom) Toby Martyn (TRRS)	1) (United Kingdom) Emma Bristow (Sherco); 2) (Spain) Berta Abellán (Vértigo); 3) (Spain) Sandra Gómez (TRRS)	1) (France) Naomi Monnier (Beta); 2) (United Kingdom) Alicia Robinson (Beta); 3) (Italy) Andrea Rabino (TRRS)
2021	1) (Spain) Toni Bou (Montesa); 2) (Spain) Adam Raga (TRRS); 3) (Spain) Jaime Busto (Vértigo)	1) (Spain) Toni Bou (Montesa); 2) (Spain) Adam Raga (TRRS); 3) (Spain) Jaime Busto (Vértigo)	1) (United Kingdom) Toby Martyn (TRRS); 2) (United Kingdom) Jack Peace (Sherco); 3) (Spain) Aniol Gelabert (Beta)	1) (Spain) Laia Sanz (Gas Gas); 2) (United Kingdom) Emma Bristow (Sherco); 3) (Spain) Berta Abellán (Vértigo)	1) (Italy) Andrea Sofia Rabino (Beta); 2) (Italy) Sara Trentini (Vértigo); 3) (United Kingdom) Kaytlyn Adshead (TRRS)
2022	1) (Spain) Toni Bou (Montesa); 2) (Spain) Jaime Busto (Vértigo); 3) (Spain) Adam Raga (TRRS)	1) (Spain) Toni Bou (Montesa); 2) (Spain) Adam Raga (TRRS); 3) (Spain) Jaime Busto (Vértigo)	1) (Norway) Sondre Haga (Beta); 2) (Spain) Pablo Suárez (Montesa); 3) (Spain) Arnau Farré (Sherco)	1) (United Kingdom) Emma Bristow (Sherco); 2) (Spain) Berta Abellán (Scorpa); 3) (Italy) Andrea Sofia Rabino (Beta)	1) (Czech Republic) Denisa Pecháčková (Beta); 2) (Germany) Theresa Bauml (Vértigo); 3) (United Kingdom) Kaytlyn Adshead (TRRS)
2023	1) (Spain) Toni Bou (Montesa); 2) (Spain) Jaime Busto (Gas Gas); 3) (Spain) Gabriel Marcelli (Montesa)	1) (Spain) Toni Bou (Montesa); 2) (Spain) Jaime Busto (Gas Gas); 3) (Spain) Gabriel Marcelli (Montesa)	1) (United Kingdom) Billy Green (Scorpa); 2) (Spain) Pablo Suárez (Montesa); 3) (United Kingdom) Jack Peace (Sherco)	1) (United Kingdom) Emma Bristow (Sherco); 2) (Spain) Berta Abellán (Scorpa); 3) (Italy) Andrea Sofia Rabino (Beta)	1) (France) Alycia Soyer (TRRS); 2) (Italy) Alessia Bacchetta (Gas Gas); 3) (Spain) Laia Pi (Beta)
2024	1) (Spain) Toni Bou (Montesa); 2) (Spain) Gabriel Marcelli (Montesa); 3) (Spain) Jaime Busto (Gas Gas)	1) (Spain) Toni Bou (Montesa); 2) (Spain) Jaime Busto (Gas Gas); 3) (Spain) Gabriel Marcelli (Montesa)	1) (United Kingdom) Jack Peace (Sherco); 2) (Spain) Arnau Farré (Sherco); 3) (United Kingdom) Billy Green (Scorpa)	1) (United Kingdom) Emma Bristow (Sherco); 2) (Spain) Berta Abellán (Scorpa); 3) (Italy) Andrea Sofia Rabino (Beta)	1) (Italy) Martina Brandani (Sherco); 2) (Spain) Laia Pi (Beta); 3) (Italy) Sara Trentini (TRRS)
2025	1) (Spain) Toni Bou (Montesa); 2) (Spain) Jaime Busto (Gas Gas); 3) (Spain) Gabriel Marcelli (Montesa)	1) (Spain) Toni Bou (Montesa); 2) (Spain) Jaime Busto (Gas Gas); 3) (Spain) Gabriel Marcelli (Montesa)	1) (United Kingdom) Harry Hemingway (Beta); 2) (Spain) Miquel Gelabert (Honda); 3) (Spain) Gabriel Marcelli (Sherco)	1) (Spain) Berta Abellán (Scorpa); 2) (Italy) Andrea Sofia Rabino (Beta); 3) (Czech Republic) Denisa Pecháčková (TRRS)	1) (Italy) Sara Trentini (TRRS); 2) (France) Margaux Pena (Electric Motion); 3) (Spain) Daniela Hernando (Beta)
2026	1) (Spain) Toni Bou (Montesa); 2) (Spain) Gabriel Marcelli (Montesa); 3) (Spain) Jaime Busto (Beta)	1) (Spain) Toni Bou (Montesa); 2) (Spain) Gabriel Marcelli (Montesa); 3) (Spain) Jaime Busto (Gas Gas)	1) (Spain) Arnau Farré (Sherco); 2) (United Kingdom) George Hemingway (Beta); 3) (Spain) Alex Canales (Montesa)	1) (Spain) Berta Abellán (Scorpa); 2) (Italy) Andrea Sofia Rabino (Beta); 3) (United Kingdom) Alice Minta (Beta)	1) (Spain) Abril Montserrat (Beta); 2) (Spain) Daniela Hernando (Beta); 3) (United Kingdom) Matilda Arbon (Sherco)

== Championships per rider ==
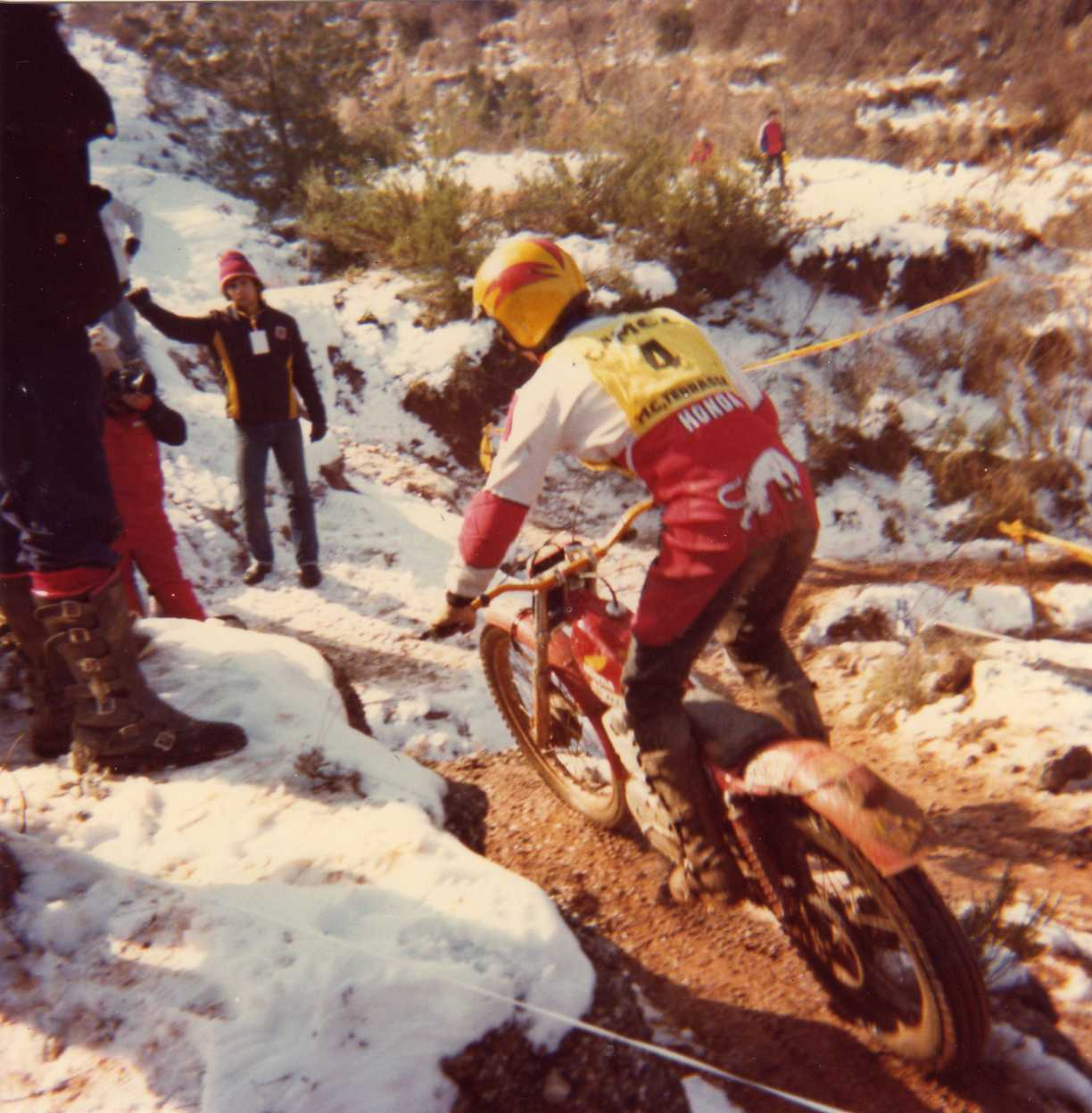
Eddy Lejeune at the 1981 Trial de Sant Llorenç

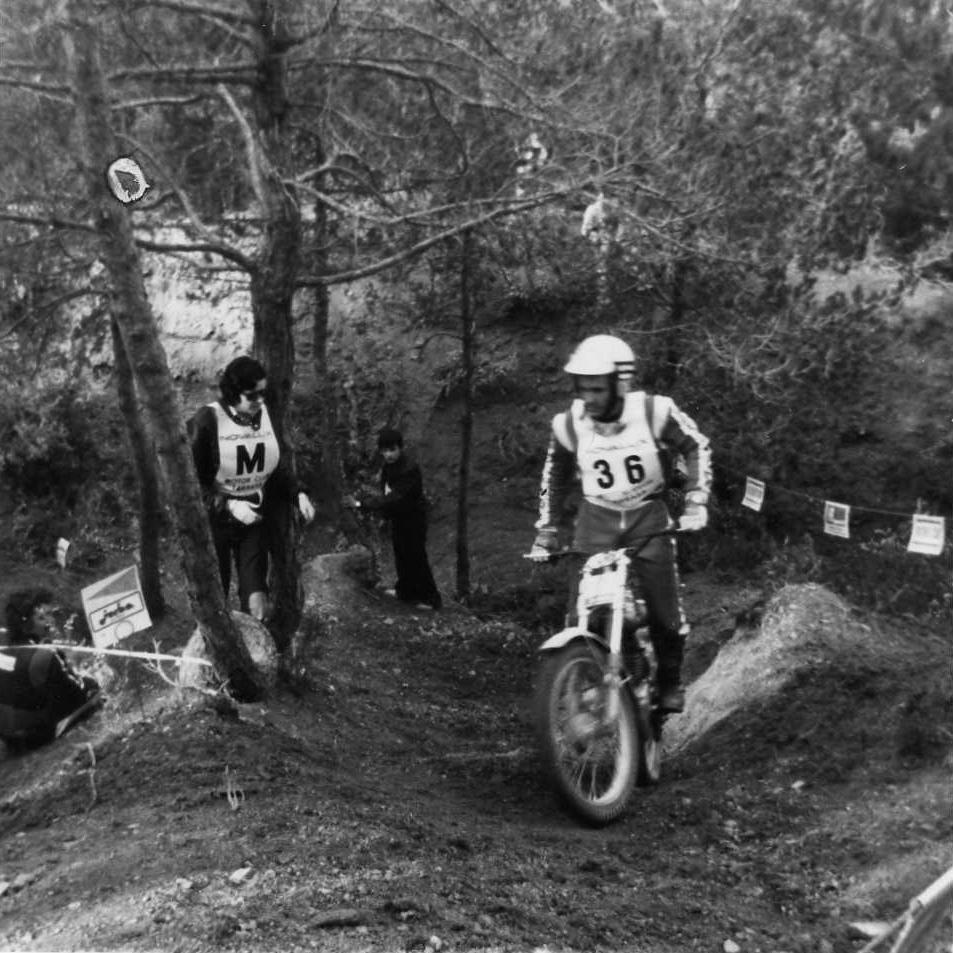
Yrjö Vesterinen at the 1978 Trial de Sant Llorenç

As of April 2025, the following ranking shows the riders with most world titles, in outdoor, indoor and total:

Rank	Rider	Country	Championships		
Rank	Rider	Country	Outdoor	Indoor	Total
1	Toni Bou	Spain	20	20	40
2	Dougie Lampkin	UK	7	5	12
3	Jordi Tarrés	Spain	7	0	7
4	Don Smith	UK	3	0	3
4	Yrjö Vesterinen	Finland	3	0	3
4	Eddy Lejeune	Belgium	3	0	3
4	Thierry Michaud	France	3	0	3
8	Adam Raga	Spain	2	4	6
9	Gustav Franke	Germany	2	0	2
9	Sammy Miller	UK	2	0	2
9	Mick Andrews	UK	2	0	2
9	Martin Lampkin	UK	2	0	2
13	Marc Colomer	Spain	1	3	4
14	Tommi Ahvala	Finland	1	1	2
15	Malcolm Rathmell	UK	1	0	1
15	Bernie Schreiber	United States	1	0	1
15	Ulf Karlson	Sweden	1	0	1
15	Gilles Burgat	France	1	0	1
15	Takahisa Fujinami	Japan	1	0	1
20	Albert Cabestany	Spain	0	1	1

== Championships per country ==
As of April 2025, the following ranking shows the countries with most world titles, in outdoor, indoor and total:

Rank	Country	Championships		
Rank	Country	Outdoor	Indoor	Total
1	Spain	30	28	58
2	UK	17	5	22
3	Finland	4	1	5
4	France	4	0	4
5	Belgium	3	0	3
6	Germany	2	0	2
7	Japan	1	0	1
7	Sweden	1	0	1
7	United States	1	0	1

== See also ==
- FIM Trial European Championship
- Trial des Nations
- Scott Trial
- Scottish Six Days Trial
- NATC Trials Championship
