= Jordi Tarrés (motorcycle trials rider) =

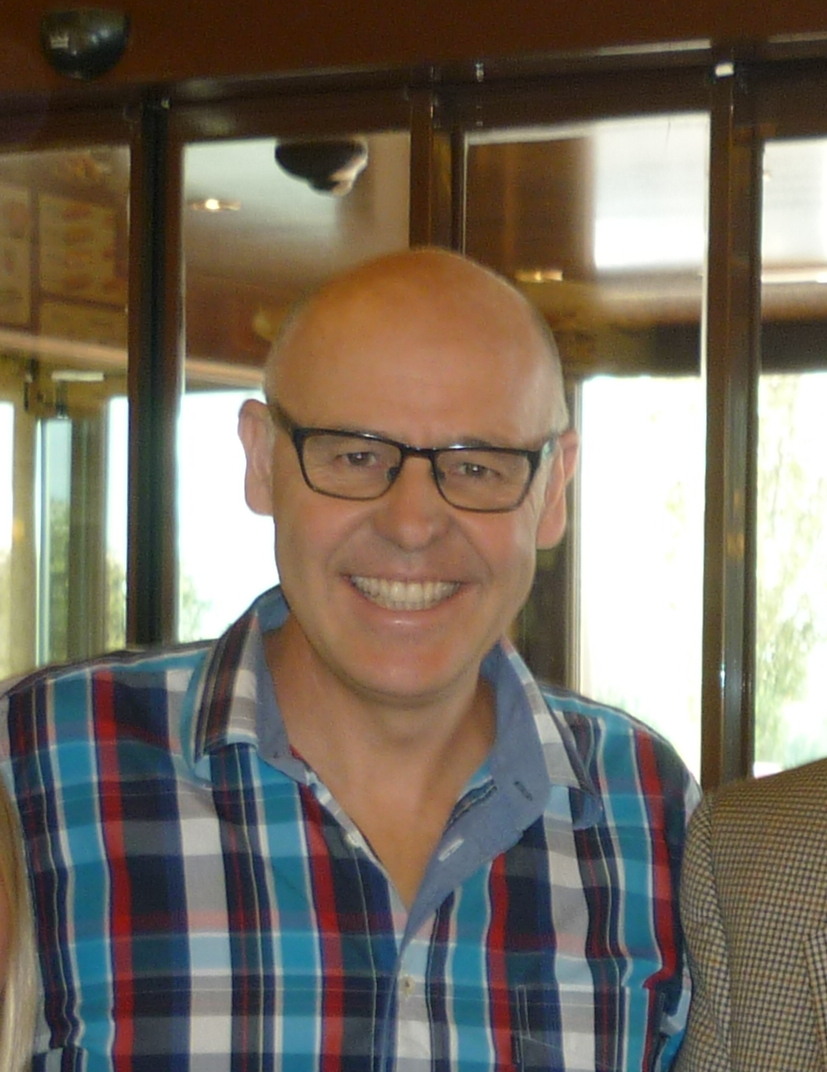
- Nationality: Spanish
- Born: 10 September 1966 (age 60); Rellinars, Spain
- Current team: Retired
- Website: Jordi Tarrés official site

Jordi Tarrés (born 10 September 1966 in Rellinars, Spain) is a Spanish former international motorcycle trials rider. He competed in the FIM Trial World Championships from 1985 to 1997. Tarrés is notable for being a seven-time motorcycle trials world champion. He is the third most successful trials rider in history, after Dougie Lampkin with 12 titles (7 outdoor and 5 indoor) and Toni Bou with 40 (20 outdoor and 20 indoor). In 2010, Tarrés was named an FIM Legend for his motorcycling achievements.
