= Takahisa Kawakami =

Japanese United Nations official (1950–2010)

Takahisa Kawakami (川上 隆久, Kawakami Takahisa, born 5 January 1950 in Hamamatsu, Shizuoka, Japan) was the United Nations Deputy Special Representative of the Secretary-General for Security Sector Support and Rule of Law, United Nations Integrated Mission in Timor-Leste (UNMIT). He was appointed to this position by United Nations Secretary-General Ban Ki-moon on 2 September 2008.

== Education ==
Kawakami obtained his degree in political science from Waseda University in Tokyo.

== Career ==
Prior to his appointment to East Timor, he was Chief of Staff in the United Nations Assistance Mission in Afghanistan (UNAMA). Between 1995 and 2000, he worked at the United Nations Department of Peacekeeping Operations.

In between his service with the UN, he had been posted to the Permanent Mission of Japan to the United Nations in New York City twice, from 1987 to 1991 and 2003 to 2007.

== Death ==
Kawakami died while serving in Dili, East Timor, on 14 March 2010.
