= Takahisa Fujinami =

Japanese motorcycle racer

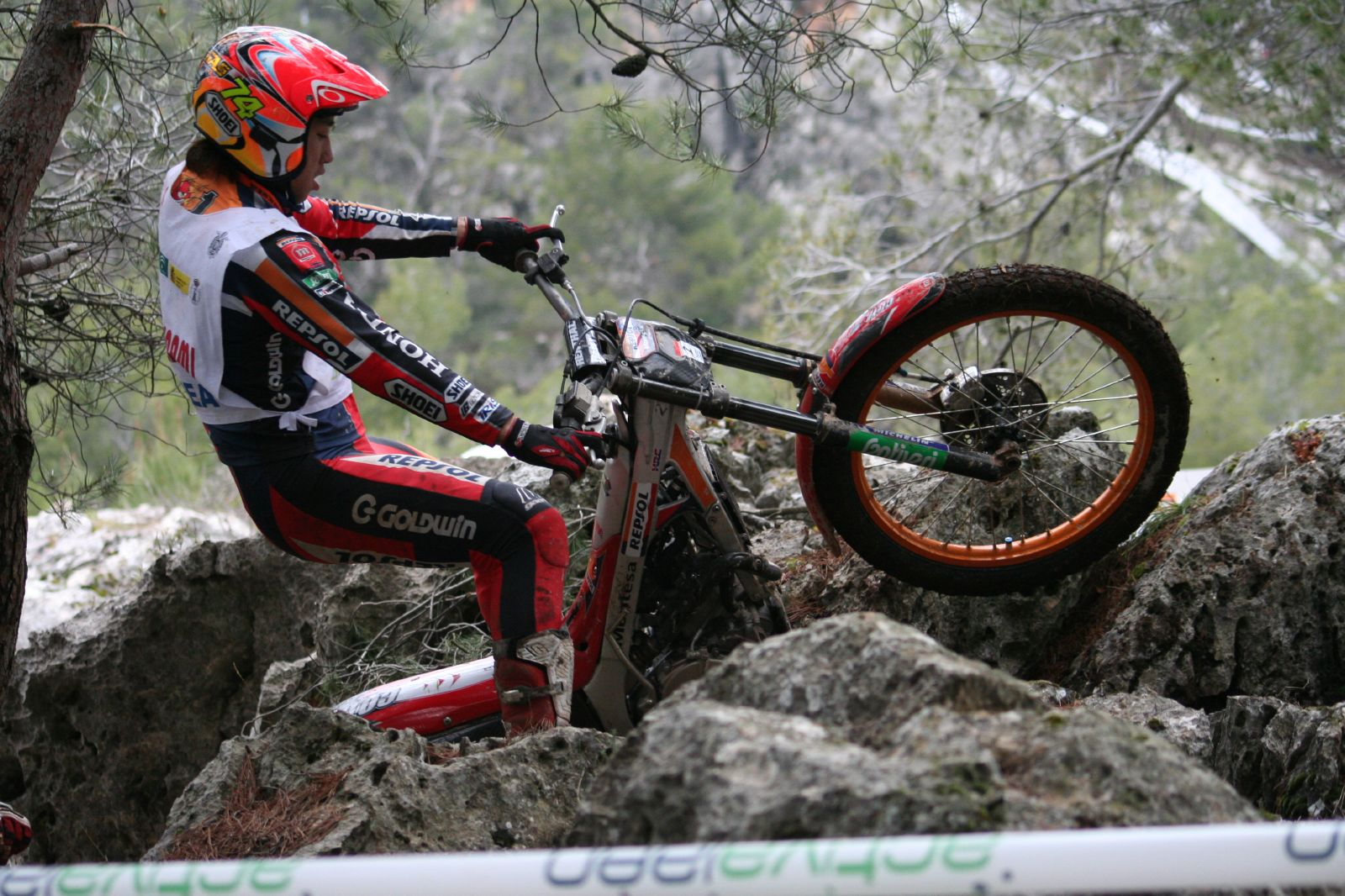
- Takahisa Fujinami at the 2007 FIM Trial World Championship opening round
- Nationality: Japanese
- Born: January 13, 1980 (age 46); Yokkaichi, Mie, Japan
- Current team: Montesa Honda
- Website: fujigas.net

Takahisa Fujinami (藤波貴久, Takahisa Fujinami; born 13 January 1980 in Yokkaichi, Mie, Japan), nicknamed Fujigas, is a Japanese retired motorcycle trials rider. Fujinami competed in motorcycle trial riding from a young age and became a FIM world champion in 2004. Fujinami retired from trial riding after the 2021 TrialGP season to take up the role of team manager of the Repsol Honda Trial Team; his seat would be taken by Gabriel Marcelli, who would ride for the team from 2022 onward.

== Major titles ==
- 1995
  - 1st All Japan Trial Championship
- 1998
  - 1st All Japan Trial Championship
- 1999
  - 1st All Japan Trial Championship (Grand Slam)
  - 2nd World Trial Championship
- 2000
  - 2nd World Trial Championship
  - 1st All Japan Trial Championship
- 2001
  - 2nd World Trial Championship
  - 1st All Japan Trial Championship
- 2002
  - 2nd World Trial Championship
- 2003
  - 2nd World Trial Championship
- 2004
  - World Trial Champion
  - 2nd World Indoor Trial Championship
- 2005
  - 2nd World Trial Championship
- 2006
  - 2nd World Trial Championship

== World Trials Championship career ==
Year	Team	1	2	3	4	5	6	7	8	9	10	11	12	13	14	15	16	17	18	Points	Rank
1996	Honda	SPA -	GBR; 6	IRL; 9	USA; 4	CAN; 10	FRA; 8	ITA; 11	GER; 8	CZE; 13	BEL; 9									67	7th
2001	Honda	SPA; 10	SPA; 3	POR; 2	POR; 3	BEL; 1	BEL; 3	JAP; 2	JAP; 2	USA; 3	USA; 3	ITA; 2	ITA; 3	FRA; 8	FRA; 2	AND; 4	AND; 4	CZE; 7	CZE; 5	255	2nd
2005	Honda	POR; 5	SPA; 4	JAP; 1	JAP; 3	USA; 2	USA; 1	AND; 4	FRA; 5	FRA; 8	ITA; 2	ITA; 1	GBR; 2	GER; 8	GER; 3	BEL; 3				220	2nd
2006	Montesa	SPA; 6	POR; 1	USA; 6	USA; 5	JAP; 4	JAP; 4	FRA; 2	ITA; 1	POL; 1	GBR; 1	AND; 2	BEL; 4							184	2nd
2007	Montesa	SPA; 4	GUA; 2	GUA; 3	FRA; 4	JAP; 3	JAP; 3	ITA; 3	POL; 4	CZE; 4	GBR; 3	AND; 5								155	3rd
2008	Montesa	IRL; 3	IRL; 3	USA; 1	USA; 2	JAP; 3	JAP; 3	FRA; 3	ITA; 3	CZE; 3	SWE; 3	POR; 4	SPA; 4							183	3rd
2009	Montesa	IRL; 3	IRL; 5	POR; 6	GBR -	GBR; 4	JAP; 2	JAP; 2	ITA; 2	AND; 4	SPA; 2	FRA; 2								147	3rd
2010	Montesa	SPA; 4	POR; 4	POR; 1	JAP; 4	JAP; 4	GBR; 3	GBR; 1	FRA; 2	RSM; 5	ITA; 3	CZE; 5								161	3rd
2011	Montesa	GER; 3	FRA; 5	FRA; 4	SPA; 4	AND; 2	ITA; 3	GBR; 3	JAP; 3	JAP; 2	FRA; 5	FRA; 4								155	3rd
2012	Montesa	FRA; 5	FRA; 4	AUS; 4	AUS; 3	JAP; 4	JAP; 3	SPA; 5	SPA; 4	AND; 3	AND; 5	ITA; 2	GBR; 2	GBR; 6						174	5th
2013	Montesa	JAP; 4	JAP; 1	AUS; 5	AUS; 3	AND; 5	AND; 5	SPA; 4	ITA; 3	SPA; 6	GBR; 2	GBR; 4	FRA; 6	FRA; 6						169	5th
2014	Montesa	AUS; 1	AUS; 6	JAP; 3	JAP; 4	EUR -	EUR; 6	ITA; 6	BEL; 4	GBR; 5	GBR; 5	FRA; 6	SPA; 5	SPA; 5						145	5th
2015	Montesa	JAP; 4	JAP; 2	CZE; 6	CZE; 4	SWE; 3	SWE; 5	GBR; 7	GBR; 6	FRA; 3	FRA; 4	AND; 8	AND; 5	USA; 6	USA; 5	POR; 8	POR; 9	SPA; 10	SPA; 7	196	5th
2016	Montesa	SPA; 7	SPA; 5	JAP; 3	JAP; 3	GER; 4	GER; 5	AND; 3	AND; 6	FRA; 2	FRA; 1	BEL; 5	GBR; 5	GBR; 5	ITA; 6	ITA; 5				190	3rd
2017	Montesa	SPA; 5	JAP; 3	JAP; 5	AND; 5	FRA; 4	GBR; 2	USA; 8	USA; 7	CZE; 5	ITA; 10									112	5th
