= Rebekah Cook =

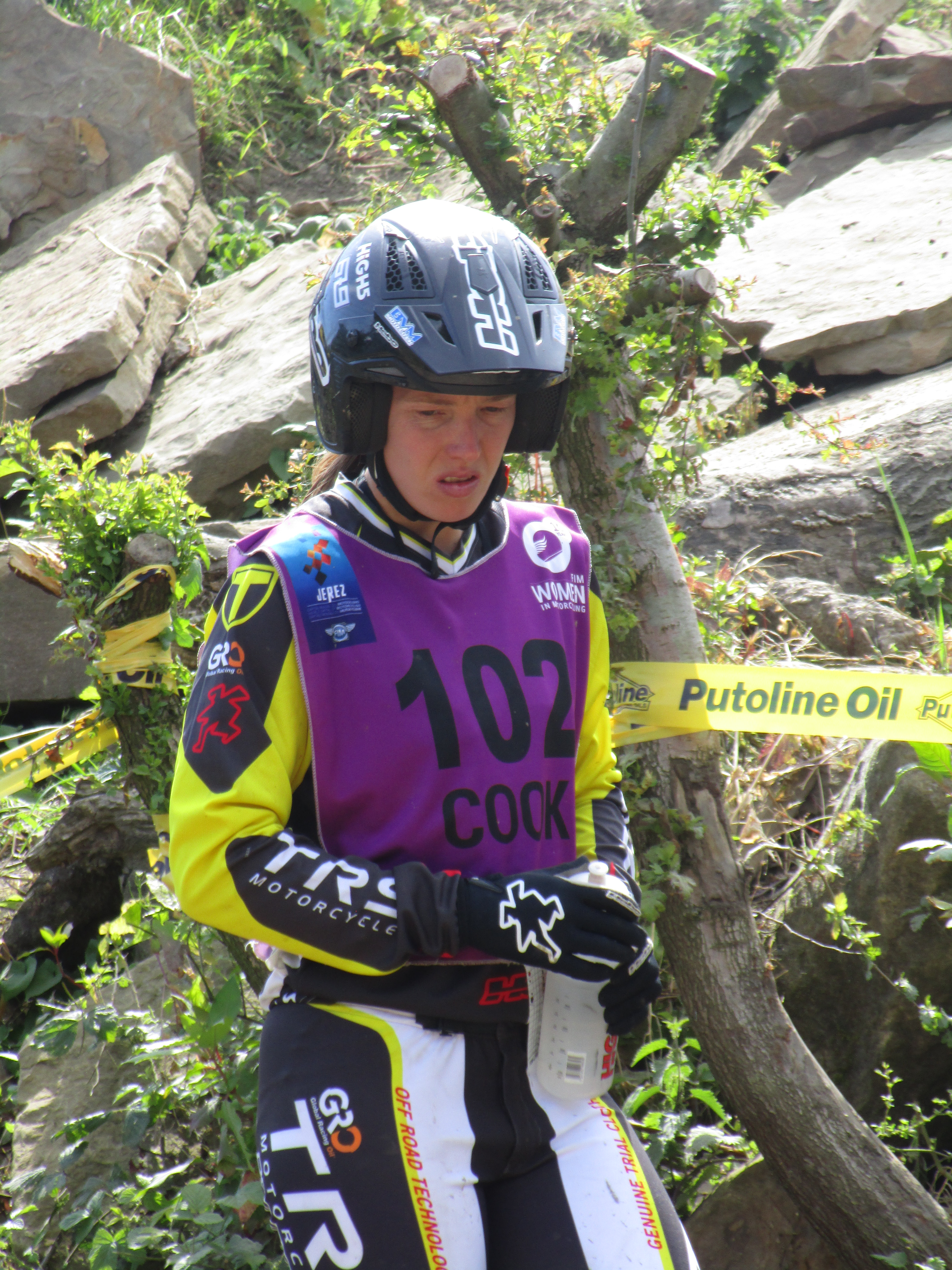
- Nationality: (United Kingdom) British
- Born: 3 August 1986 (age 40); Newport, Isle of Wight, England
- Current team: Beta

Rebekah Cook Talbot (born 3 August 1986) is an English woman's international motorcycle trials rider. Rebekah is nine times British Women's Trials Champion, winning in 2004, 2005, 2006, 2007, 2008, 2009, 2011, 2012 and 2013. In 2012, she was also European Women's Trials Champion.

== Biography ==
Cook has been competing in the British Women's Trials Championship class since 2004 and won the championship in her first year. This started a six-year run of championship wins until she finished runner-up to Gas Gas rider Joanne Coles in 2010. In 2011 Cook was back to her winning ways, repeating in 2012 and 2013 until she was beaten in 2014 by current Women's World Champion Emma Bristow. On the world scene she was runner-up in 2008, 2009 and 2010 to Laia Sanz and then again to Emma Bristow in 2014.

== British Women's Trials Championship ==
Year	Team	1	2	3	4	5	6	7	Points	Rank
2005	Gas Gas	MIT; 3	WOE; 1	MCK; 1	IRE; 1	LOC; 1	BRA; 1		100	1st
2011	Sherco	MOO; 1	SCA; 2	LIN; 1	SOU; 1	MAN; 2	YEA; 1	RIC; 2	114	1st
2012	Beta	LOC; 2	DIR; 1	SCA; 1	WES; 2	MCK; 1	ESW; 1		97	1st
2013	Sherco	COL; 1	CHR; 2	VIC; 1	WAI; 1	AST; 2	POW; 1	TRA; 2	114	1st
2014	Beta	OTT; 2	SOU; 1	SCA; 3	ART; 2	STE; 2	STE; 2	PID; 2	105	2nd
2015	J Gas	NBE; 2	LUT; 1	ZON; 3	ZON; 2	MAN; 2	IOM; 2	IOM; 2	105	2nd
2017		NBE -	SOU -	TOR -	BEX -	NOE -	NOE; 2		17	8th

== European Women's Trials Championship ==
Year	Team	1	2	3	Points	Rank
2004	Gas Gas	FRA; 7	GBR; 11	SPA; 9	21	9th
2005	Gas Gas	ITA; 4	NOR; 4	ITA; 3	41	3rd
2006	Gas Gas	FRA; 5	ITA; 2	SPA; 4	41	4th
2007	Gas Gas	SPA; 3	ITA; 3	NOR; 2	47	3rd
2008	Gas Gas	FRA; 3	ITA; 2	CZE; 3	47	3rd
2009	Sherco	POL; 2	ITA; 2	CZE; 2	51	2nd
2010	Sherco	ITA; 2	AND; 3	CZE; 3	47	3rd
2011	Sherco	ITA; 3	GER; 2	CZE; 3	47	3rd
2012	Beta	ITA; 2	CZE; 1	NED; 1	57	1st

== World Trials Championship ==
Year	Team	1	2	3	4	5	Points	Rank
2004	Gas-Gas	SPA; 13	SPA; 10				9	13th
2005	Gas-Gas	ITA; 6	ITA; 8				18	6th
2006	Gas-Gas	AND; 3	BEL; 2	FRA; 3			32	3rd
2007	Gas Gas	CZE; 3	BEL -	GBR; 3			30	3rd
2008	Gas Gas	LUX; 2	SPA; 3	AND; 2			35	2nd
2009	Sherco	AND; 2	FRA; 3	ITA; 2			34	2nd
2010	Sherco	FRA; 4	CZE; 2	POL; 2			34	2nd
2011	Sherco	GER; 3	CZE; 3	ITA; 2			32	3rd
2012	Beta	AND; 5	AND; 3	SWI; 3	SWI; 3	SWI; 3	45	4th
2013	Beta	AND; 1	AND; 2	FRA; 3	FRA; 3	FRA; 10	52	3rd
2014	Beta	BEL; 2	SPA; 6	SPA; 1	AND; 3		52	2nd
2015	JGas	CZE; 1	CZE; 3	SPA; 2	SPA; 2	SPA; 3	54	2nd
2016	T R S	GBR; 2	GBR; 2	ITA -	ITA; 5	FRA; 9	52	3rd

== Honors ==
- British Women's Trials Champion 2004, 2005, 2006, 2007, 2008, 2009, 2011, 2012, 2013
- European Women's Trials Champion 2012
- British Women's Team Trial Des Nations Champion 2006, 2007, 2009, 2013, 2014, 2015, 2016

== See also ==
- FIM Trial World Championship
- FIM Trial European Championship
