= Iris Kramer =

German motorcycle racer

- Nationality: German
- Born: 22 June 1981 (age 45); Darmstadt, Germany

Iris Kramer (born 22 June 1981) is a German International motorcycle trials rider. Kramer is notable for winning six German Women's Trials Championships, three Women's FIM Trial European Championships and the 2007 Women's FIM Trial World Championship. In 2011, Kramer was named an FIM Legend for her motorcycling achievements.

== Biography ==
Born in Darmstadt, Germany, Kramer first competed in the German Women's Trials Championship in 2002, winning the title that year and successfully defending in for the next six years. She competed in the FIM European Championships in 1999, becoming the first Women's European Champion after finishing ahead of Norwegian rider Linda Meyer. In 2000, she again took the championship ahead of Spanish superstar Laia Sanz. Kramer's third European title came in 2001, narrowly beating Laia Sanz again before Sanz turned the tables on her in 2002. Kramer was runner up to Sanz in 2003, 2005, 2006, 2007, and 2008 and finished her final season in international competition third in 2009. In the FIM Trial World Championship, Kramer finished second in 2000 through 2006 before taking the title in 2007.

== National Trials Championship career ==
| Year | Class | Machine | Rd 1 | Rd 2 | Rd 3 | Rd 4 | Rd 5 | Rd 6 | Rd 7 | Rd 8 | Rd 9 | Rd 10 | Points | Pos | Notes |
|---|---|---|---|---|---|---|---|---|---|---|---|---|---|---|---|
| 2005 | (Germany) German Women's | Gas Gas | GRO; 1 | GRO; 1 | KIE; 1 | KIE; 1 | ROH; 1 | ROH; 1 | SCH; 1 | SCH; 2 | OSN - | OSN - | 831.9 | 1st | German Women's Champion |
| 2006 | (Germany) German Women's | Gas Gas | HER - | HER - | DRE - | DRE - | PIE; 2 | PIE; 2 | | | | | 157.1 | 1st | German Women's Champion |
| 2007 | (Germany) German Women's | Scorpa | GRO; 2 | GRO; 2 | HOL; 1 | ROS; 1 | SCH; 1 | SCH; 1 | ROH; 1 | ROH; 1 | NEU; 1 | NEU; 1 | 1046 | 1st | German Women's Champion |

== International Trials Championship career ==
| Year | Class | Machine | Rd 1 | Rd 2 | Rd 3 | Points | Pos | Notes |
|---|---|---|---|---|---|---|---|---|
| 1999 | European Women's Championship | Gas Gas | ITA; 1 | | | 20 | 1st | European Women's Champion |
| 2000 | European Women's Championship | Gas Gas | GER; 1 | ITA; 2 | NOR; 1 | 57 | 1st | European Women's Champion |
| 2000 | FIM World Women's Championship | Gas Gas | SPA; 2 | | | 17 | 2nd | |
| 2001 | European Women's Championship | Gas Gas | SPA; 2 | ITA; 1 | | 37 | 1st | European Women's Champion |
| 2001 | FIM World Women's Championship | Gas Gas | ITA; 2 | | | 17 | 2nd | |
| 2002 | European Women's Championship | Gas Gas | NOR; 2 | SPA; 2 | | 34 | 2nd | |
| 2002 | FIM World Women's Championship | Gas Gas | POR; 2 | | | 17 | 2nd | |
| 2003 | European Women's Championship | Gas Gas | FRA; 2 | ITA; 2 | RSM; 2 | 51 | 2nd | |
| 2003 | FIM World Women's Championship | Gas Gas | RSM; 2 | | | 17 | 2nd | |
| 2004 | European Women's Championship | Gas Gas | FRA; 2 | GBR; 2 | SPA - | 34 | 3rd | |
| 2005 | European Women's Championship | Gas Gas | ITA; 2 | NOR; 2 | ITA; 2 | 51 | 2nd | |
| 2005 | FIM World Women's Championship | Gas Gas | ITA; 2 | ITA; 2 | | 34 | 2nd | |
| 2006 | European Women's Championship | Gas Gas | FRA; 2 | ITA; 3 | SPA; 2 | 49 | 2nd | |
| 2006 | FIM World Women's Championship | Gas Gas | AND; 2 | BEL; 3 | FRA; 2 | 34 | 2nd | |
| 2007 | European Women's Championship | Scorpa | SPA; 2 | ITA; 2 | NOR; 3 | 49 | 2nd | |
| 2007 | FIM World Women's Championship | Scorpa | CZE; 2 | BEL - | GBR; 1 | 37 | 1st | FIM Women's World Champion |
| 2008 | European Women's Championship | Scorpa | FRA; 2 | ITA; 3 | CZE; 2 | 49 | 2nd | |
| 2008 | FIM World Women's Championship | Scorpa | LUX; 3 | SPA; 2 | AND; 3 | 32 | 3rd | |
| 2009 | European Women's Championship | Scorpa | POL; 3 | ITA; 3 | CZE; 3 | 45 | 3rd | |
| 2009 | FIM World Women's Championship | Gas Gas | AND; 4 | FRA; 2 | ITA; 3 | 32 | 3rd | |

== Honors ==
- German Women's Trials Champion 2002, 2003, 2004, 2005, 2006, 2007
- FIM European Women's Trials Champion 1999, 2000, 2001
- FIM World Women's Trials Champion 2007

== See also ==
- FIM Trial European Championship
- FIM Trial World Championship
