= FIM Trial European Championship =

The FIM Trials European Championship is organised by the Fédération Internationale de Motocyclisme and has been held since 1992. The championship gives up and coming riders a chance to compete at international level against top class riders, many who have progressed to become champions in the FIM Trial World Championship such as current champion Toni Bou and past champions Dougie Lampkin and Adam Raga

== History ==
The Inaugural championship was held in 1992 with a single class format. In 1999 a women's class was added in part due to the addition of a women's class In the FIM Trial World Championship series the previous year. In 2004 a European Junior class was added, with many riders starting in the junior class before progressing through to the Pro class main series. An example of this is British rider Alexz Wigg who won the Junior title in 2006 and after moving up won the Pro series in 2010.

== FIM European Trials Champions ==
Year	Pro Series	Junior Series	Women's Series
1992	1) (Spain) Joan Pons (Beta); 2) (France) Gilles Ciamin (Aprilia); 3) (Czech Republic) Miroslav Lisy (Gas Gas)		
1993	1) (United Kingdom) Dougie Lampkin (Beta); 2) (Spain) Cesar Panicot (Gas Gas); 3) (Italy) Dario Re Delle Gandine (Beta)		
1994	1) (Spain) Jose Antonio Benitez (Beta); 2) (United Kingdom) Graham Jarvis (Scorpa); 3) (Spain) Jordi Picola (Montesa)		
1995	1) (Spain) Marcel Justribo (Beta); 2) (Japan) Kenichi Kuroyama (Beta); 3) (Spain) Gabriel Reyes (Montesa)		
1996	1) (Spain) Gabriel Reyes (Montesa); 2) (Spain) David Cobos (Gas Gas); 3) (France) Christophe Camozzi (Gas Gas)		
1997	1) (Spain) Marc Catlla (Gas Gas); 2) (Spain) Marc Freixa (Gas Gas); 3) (France) Christophe Camozzi (Gas Gas)		
1998	1) (Spain) Jordi Pascuet (Montesa); 2) (Spain) Albert Cabestany (Beta); 3) (Spain) Marc Freixa (Gas Gas)		
1999	1) (Spain) Jose Manuel Alcaraz (Montesa); 2) (Spain) Adam Raga (Gas Gas); 3) (Belgium) Fred Crosset (Gas Gas)		1) (Germany) Iris Kramer (Gas Gas); 2) (Norway) Linda Meyer (Gas Gas); 3) (Italy) Simona Chauvie (Beta)
2000	1) (Spain) Adam Raga (Gas Gas); 2) (Spain) Josep Manzano (Sherco); 3) (Italy) Dario Re Delle Gandine (Montesa)		1) (Germany) Iris Kramer (Gas Gas); 2) (Spain) Laia Sanz (Gas Gas); 3) (France) Claire Bertrand (Montesa)
2001	1) (Spain) Josep Manzano (Sherco); 2) (United Kingdom) Sam Connor (Gas Gas); 3) (Spain) Jose Maria Saez (Montesa)		1) (Germany) Iris Kramer (Gas Gas); 2) (Spain) Laia Sanz (Beta); 3) (France) Claire Bertrand (Gas Gas)
2002	1) (Spain) Jeroni Fajardo (Gas Gas); 2) (Spain) Sergio Leon (Montesa); 3) (United Kingdom) Sam Connor (Gas Gas)		1) (Spain) Laia Sanz (Beta); 2) (Germany) Iris Kramer (Gas Gas); 3) (Norway) Linda Meyer (Gas Gas)
2003	1) (Spain) Toni Bou (Beta); 2) (Poland) Tadeusz Blazusiak (Gas Gas); 3) (Italy) Fabio Lenzi (Gas Gas)		1) (Spain) Laia Sanz (Beta); 2) (Germany) Iris Kramer (Gas Gas); 3) (United Kingdom) Maria Conway (Beta)
2004	1) (Poland) Tadeusz Blazusiak (Gas Gas); 2) (Italy) Michele Orizio (Beta); 3) (Italy) Fabio Lenzi (Gas Gas)	1) (Italy) Matteo Grattarola (Sherco); 2) (Italy) Simone Comi (Gas Gas); 3) (France) Bertrand Dagnicourt (Sherco)	1) (Spain) Laia Sanz (Montesa); 2) (France) Claire Bertrand (Gas Gas); 3) (Germany) Iris Kramer (Gas Gas)
2005	1) (United Kingdom) Shaun Morris (Gas Gas); 2) (France) Jerome Bethune (Gas Gas); 3) (Italy) Fabio Lenzi (Gas Gas)	1) (Spain) Daniel Oliveras (Gas Gas); 2) (Italy) Matteo Grattarola (Sherco); 3) (Italy) Alessandro Mondo (Gas Gas)	1) (Spain) Laia Sanz (Montesa); 2) (Germany) Iris Kramer (Gas Gas); 3) (United Kingdom) Rebekah Cook (Gas Gas)
2006	1) (United Kingdom) James Dabill (Beta); 2) (France) Jerome Bethune (Gas Gas); 3) (Spain) Daniel Oliveras (Gas Gas)	1) (United Kingdom) Alexz Wigg (Gas Gas); 2) (France) Loris Gubian (Sherco); 3) (Italy) Matteo Grattarola (Sherco)	1) (Spain) Laia Sanz (Montesa); 2) (Germany) Iris Kramer (Gas Gas); 3) (France) Claire Bertrand (Gas Gas)
2007	1) (Spain) Daniel Gibert (Montesa); 2) (Italy) Fabio Lenzi (Montesa); 3) (France) Jerome Bethune (Beta)	1) (Spain) Alfredo Gomez (Gas Gas); 2) (United Kingdom) Ross Danby (Gas Gas); 3) (Spain) David Millan (Sherco)	1) (Spain) Laia Sanz (Montesa); 2) (Germany) Iris Kramer (Scorpa); 3) (United Kingdom) Rebekah Cook (Gas Gas)
2008	1) (United Kingdom) Michael Brown (Beta); 2) (United Kingdom) Alexz Wigg (Montesa); 3) (Spain) Alfredo Gomez (Montesa)	1) (France) Alexandre Ferrer (Sherco); 2) (United Kingdom) Jack Challoner (Beta); 3) (Spain) Francesc Moret (Gas Gas)	1) (Spain) Laia Sanz (Montesa); 2) (Germany) Iris Kramer (Scorpa); 3) (United Kingdom) Rebekah Cook (Gas Gas)
2009	1) (France) Loris Gubian (Gas Gas); 2) (Spain) Alfredo Gomez (Montesa); 3) (United Kingdom) Alexz Wigg (Beta)	1) (United Kingdom) Jonathan Richardson (Sherco); 2) (Italy) Luca Cotone (Beta); 3) (Spain) Pere Borrellas (Gas Gas)	1) (Spain) Laia Sanz (Montesa); 2) (United Kingdom) Rebekah Cook (Sherco); 3) (Germany) Iris Kramer (Scorpa)
2010	1) (United Kingdom) Alexz Wigg (Beta); 2) (Italy) Matteo Grattarola (Sherco); 3) (United Kingdom) Jack Challoner (Beta)	1) (Spain) Pol Tarres (Gas Gas); 2) (United Kingdom) Jack Sheppard (Beta); 3) (Italy) Giacomo Saleri (Beta)	1) (Spain) Laia Sanz (Montesa); 2) (United Kingdom) Joanne Coles (Gas Gas); 3) (United Kingdom) Rebekah Cook (Sherco)
2011	1) (United Kingdom) Jack Challoner (Beta); 2) (Spain) Alfredo Gomez (Montesa); 3) (Italy) Matteo Grattarola (Gas Gas)	1) (United Kingdom) Jack Sheppard (Beta); 2) (Italy) Giacomo Saleri (Beta); 3) (France) Steven Coquelin (Gas Gas)	1) (Spain) Laia Sanz (Montesa); 2) (United Kingdom) Emma Bristow (Ossa); 3) (United Kingdom) Rebekah Cook (Sherco)
2012	1) (Italy) Matteo Grattarola (Gas Gas); 2) (Italy) Daniele Maurino (Ossa); 3) (Italy) Matteo Poli (Ossa)	1) (Italy) Francesco Cabrini (Beta); 2) (Norway) Sverre Lundevold (Beta); 3) (Italy) Pietro Petrangeli (Beta)	1) (United Kingdom) Rebekah Cook (Beta); 2) (United Kingdom) Emma Bristow (Ossa); 3) (France) Sandrine Juffet (JTG)
2013	1) (Sweden) Eddie Karlsson (Montesa); 2) (Italy) Luca Cotone (Sherco); 3) (Spain) Pere Borrellas (Gas Gas)	1) (United Kingdom) Iwan Roberts (Beta); 2) (Finland) Timo Myohanen (Beta); 3) (Italy) Gabriele Giarba (Beta)	1) (United Kingdom) Emma Bristow (Sherco); 2) (Germany) Theresa Bauml (Ossa); 3) (Italy) Sara Trentini (Beta)
2014	1) (Germany) Franz Kadlec (Beta); 2) (Belgium) Maxime Warenghien (Sherco); 3) (Italy) Luca Cotone (Sherco)	1) (Germany) Sascha Neumann (Gas Gas); 2) (Italy) Marco Fioletti (Beta); 3) (Sweden) Marcus Eliasson (Beta)	1) (Germany) Ina Wilde (Sherco); 2) (Germany) Theresa Bauml (Ossa); 3) (Germany) Sarah Bauer (Sherco)
2015	1) (Italy) Gianluca Tournour (Gas Gas); 2) (Spain) Francesc Moret (Vertigo); 3) (France) Steven Coquelin (Gas Gas)	1) (France) Pierre Sauvage (Sherco); 2) (Italy) Luca Corvi (Scorpa); 3) (Germany) Max Faude (Beta)	1) (Germany) Theresa Bauml (Ossa); 2) (Italy) Sara Trentini (Sherco); 3) (Germany) Bianca Huber (Gas Gas)
2016	1) (Spain) Miquel Gelabert (Sherco); 2) (United Kingdom) Dan Peace (Gas Gas); 3) (United Kingdom) Iwan Roberts (Beta)	1) (United Kingdom) Jack Peace (Gas Gas); 2) (Italy) Luca Corvi (Scorpa); 3) (Italy) Sergio Piardi (Beta)	1) (Germany) Theresa Bauml (Beta); 2) (Norway) Ingveig Hakonsen (Beta); 3) (Italy) Sara Trentini (Beta)
2017	1) (Spain) Arnau Farré (Gas Gas); 2) (United Kingdom) Iwan Roberts (Beta); 3) (United Kingdom) Toby Martyn (Vértigo)	1) (Italy) Manuel Copetti (Vértigo); 2) (Italy) Sergio Piardi (Beta); 3) (France) Kieran Touly (Sherco)	1) (United Kingdom) Emma Bristow (Beta); 2) (Germany) Theresa Bauml (Beta); 3) (Norway) Ingveig Håkonsen (Beta)
2018	1) (Italy) Matteo Grattaola (Montesa); 2) (Spain) Francesc Moret (Montesa); 3) (United Kingdom) Dan Peace (Gas Gas)	1) (Italy) Sergio Piardi (Beta); 2) (France) Kieran Touly (Sherco); 3) (France) Hugo Dufrese (Gas Gas)	1) (Spain) Berta Abellan (Vertigo); 2) (Germany) Theresa Bauml (Montesa); 3) (Norway) Ingveig Håkonsen (TRRS)
2019	1) (Spain) Gabriel Marcelli (Montesa); 2) (Italy) Gianluca Tournour (Gas Gas); 3) (Spain) Francesc Moret (Montesa)	1) (Austria) Marco Mempor (Beta); 2) (Norway) Jarand Vold Gunvaldsen (TRS); 3) (Italy) Andrea Gabutti (Gas Gas)	1) (Norway) Ingveig Hakonsen (TRRS); 2) (Italy) Alex Brancati (Beta); 3) (United States) Madeleine Hoover (Gas Gas)
2021	1) (Norway) Sondre Haga (Beta); 2) (Italy) Gianluca Tournour (Gas Gas); 3) (France) Teo Colairo (Beta)	1) (United Kingdom) Harry Hemmingway (Beta); 2) (Czech Republic) David Fabian (Beta); 3) (Germany) Rodney Bereiter (Beta)	1) (United Kingdom) Alice Minta (Scorpa); 2) (France) Naomi Monnier (Beta); 3) (Germany) Vivian Wachs (TRRS)
2022	1) (United Kingdom) Harry Hemmingway (Beta); 2) (Spain) Pau Martinez (Vertigo); 3) (Austria) Marco Mempor (Gas Gas)	1) (Poland) Milosz Zyznoski (Gas Gas); 2) (Norway) Jone Sandvik (Sherco); 3) (Germany) Jarmil Smith (Beta)	1) (France) Naomi Monnier (Gas Gas); 2) (United Kingdom) Kaytlyn Adshead (TRRS); 3) (Germany) Vivian Wachs (TRRS)
2023	1) (Norway) Gunvaldsen Vold (TRRS); 2) (France) Teo Colairo (Beta); 3) (Switzerland) Noe Pretalli (Gas Gas)	1) (Italy) Giacomo Brunisso (Beta); 2) (Norway) Sander Bjoraa (Beta); 3) (Sweden) Noel Johansson (Gas Gas)	1) (United Kingdom) Alice Minta (Scorpa); 2) (Norway) Huldeborg Barkved (TRRS); 3) (United Kingdom) Kaytlyn Adshead (TRRS)

== Wins per country ==
As of November 2023, the following ranking shows the countries with most European titles, in Pro, Junior, Women's and total:

Rank	Country	Wins (Pro)	Wins (Junior)	Wins (Women's)	Wins (Total)
1	Spain	15	3	11	29
2	UK	7	6	5	18
3	Italy	3	6	0	9
4	Germany	1	1	6	8
5	Norway	2	0	1	3
5	France	1	1	1	3
7	Poland	1	1	0	2
8	Sweden	1	0	0	1
8	Austria	0	1	0	1

== See also ==
- Trial des Nations
- Scott Trial
- FIM Trial World Championship
- NATC Trials Championship
- Scottish Six Days Trial
