= 2020 FIM World Motorcycle Trials season =

The 2020 World trials season consisted of eight trials events with four main classes: Trial GP, Trial 2, Women's and Women's 2. It began on 5 September, with round one in Isola, France and ended with round 8 in Lazzate, Italy on 11 October.

== Season summary ==
Toni Bou would claim his fourteenth outdoor World trials championship in 2020.

Matteo Grattarola would claim his second World outdoor title, winning the Trial 2 championship in 2020.

Emma Bristow would claim her seventh outdoor World trials championship in 2020.

== 2020 World trials season calendar ==
Round	Date	Trial	Venue	Trial GP	Trial 2	Women's	Women's 2
1	5 September	France	Isola 2000	1) Toni Bou; 2) Jaime Busto; 3) Jeroni Fajardo	1) Matteo Grattarola; 2) Alexandre Ferrer; 3) Pablo Suarez	1) Emma Bristow; 2) Berta Abellan; 3) Sandra Gomez	1) Naomi Monnier; 2) Carla Rabino; 3) Lenna Volpe
2	6 September	France	Isola 2000	1) Adam Raga; 2) Jaime Busto; 3) Toni Bou	1) Alexandre Ferrer; 2) Matteo Grattarola; 3) Toby Martyn	1) Emma Bristow; 2) Berta Abellan; 3) Sandra Gomez	1) Carla Rabino; 2) Naomi Monnier; 3) Lenna Volpe
3	12 September	Spain	Pobladura de las Regueras	1) Toni Bou; 2) Jaime Busto; 3) Adam Raga	1) Matteo Grattarola; 2) Pablo Suarez; 3) Alexandre Ferrer	1) Emma Bristow; 2) Sandra Gomez; 3) Berta Abellan	1) Carla Rabino; 2) Alicia Robinson; 3) Lenna Volpe
4	13 September	Spain	Pobladura de las Regueras	1) Toni Bou; 2) Adam Raga; 3) Gabriel Marcelli	1) Aniol Gelabert; 2) Matteo Grattarola; 3) Sondre Haga	1) Emma Bristow; 2) Sandra Gomez; 3) Berta Abellan	1) Alicia Robinson; 2) Naomi Monnier; 3) Lenna Volpe
5	20 September	Andorra	Saint Julia de Loria	1) Adam Raga; 2) Toni Bou; 3) Jorge Casales	1) Matteo Grattarola; 2) Alexandre Ferrer; 3) Jack Peace	1) Emma Bristow; 2) Sandra Gomez; 3) Berta Abellan	1) Naomi Monnier; 2) Alicia Robinson; 3) Martina Gallieni
6	21 September	Andorra	Saint Julia de Loria	1) Toni Bou; 2) Adam Raga; 3) Jorge Casales	1) Matteo Grattarola; 2) Jack Peace; 3) Toby Martyn	1) Emma Bristow; 2) Berta Abellan; 3) Sandra Gomez	1) Naomi Monnier; 2) Alicia Robinson; 3) Carla Rabino
7	10 October	Italy	Lazzate	1) Toni Bou; 2) Jorge Casales; 3) Jaime Busto	1) Matteo Grattarola; 2) Aniol Gelabert; 3) Sondre Haga		
8	11 October	Italy	Lazzate	1) Toni Bou; 2) Jeroni Fajardo; 3) Jorge Casales	1) Toby Martyn; 2) Gianluca Tournour; 3) Matteo Grattarola		

=== Scoring system ===
Points were awarded to the top fifteen finishers in each class. All eight rounds counted for the World GP and Trial 2 classes, all six rounds in Women's and Women's 2 classes were counted.

Position	1st	2nd	3rd	4th	5th	6th	7th	8th	9th	10th	11th	12th	13th	14th	15th
Points	20	17	15	13	11	10	9	8	7	6	5	4	3	2	1

=== Trial GP final standings ===
Pos	Rider	Machine	FRA (France)	FRA (France)	SPA (Spain)	SPA (Spain)	AND (Andorra)	AND (Andorra)	ITA (Italy)	ITA (Italy)	Pts	Notes
1	(Spain) Toni Bou	Montesa	1	3	1	1	2	1	1	1	152	2019 Spanish Champion
2	(Spain) Adam Raga	TRS	4	1	3	2	1	2	7	6	121	
3	(Spain) Jaime Busto	Vertigo	2	2	2	6	6	6	3	7	105	
4	(Spain) Jorge Casales	Gas Gas	5	5	10	8	3	3	2	3	98	
5	(Spain) Jeroni Fajardo	Sherco	3	4	6	-	9	7	5	2	82	
6	(Spain) Gabriel Marcelli	Montesa	12	10	4	3	4	8	6	4	82	
7	(Japan) Takahisa Fujinami	Montesa	6	6	8	9	7	4	4	8	78	
8	(Spain) Miquel Gelabert	Gas Gas	8	7	5	5	10	5	8	5	75	
9	(United Kingdom) James Dabill	Beta	9	11	7	7	5	9	9	9	62	
10	(United Kingdom) Dan Peace	Sherco	11	12	9	10	11	10	10	10	45	
11	(France) Benoit Bincaz	Beta	7	8	12	4	8	-	-	-	42	2019 French Champion
12	(United Kingdom) Jack Price	Vertigo	10	9	11	11	12	11	-	-	32	2019 British Champion

=== Trial 2 final standings ===
Pos	Rider	Machine	FRA (France)	FRA (France)	SPA (Spain)	SPA (Spain)	AND (Andorra)	AND (Andorra)	ITA (Italy)	ITA (Italy)	Pts	Notes
1	(Italy) Matteo Grattarola	Beta	1	2	1	2	1	1	1	3	139	2019 Italian Champion
2	(France) Alexandre Ferrer	TRS	2	1	3	11	2	4	12	10	97	
3	(United Kingdom) Toby Martyn	TRS	11	3	5	9	6	3	4	1	96	
4	(Spain) Aniol Gelabert	TRS	15	6	7	1	4	12	2	4	87	
5	(United Kingdom) Jack Peace	Sherco	10	4	4	6	3	2	7	13	85	
6	(Norway) Sondre Haga	TRS	4	7	8	3	11	9	3	8	80	
7	(Italy) Luca Petrella	Beta	9	9	6	8	13	6	6	6	65	
8	(Spain) Arnau Farre	TRS	8	11	12	4	10	8	5	12	59	
9	(Italy) Lorenzo Gandola	Vertigo	5	12	10	7	9	10	9	7	59	
10	(Spain) Pablo Suarez	Montesa	3	8	2	12	7	-	11	-	58	
11	(Spain) Francesc Moret	Montesa	7	5	15	5	5	11	14	11	55	
12	(France) Hugo Dufrese	TRS	6	10	-	10	12	7	15	5	47	
13	(United Kingdom) Billy Green	Montesa	14	13	14	15	8	5	-	14	29	
14	(Italy) Gianluca Tournour	TRS	-	-	-	-	-	-	10	2	23	
15	(Italy) Andrea Riva	TRS	-	-	13	14	-	-	8	9	20	
16	(Spain) Eric Miquel	TRS	-	14	9	13	14	13	13	-	17	
17	(Spain) Sergio Ribau	Scorpa	12	-	11	-	-	-	-	-	9	
18	(Italy) Carloalberto Rabino	Beta	13	-	-	-	15	-	-	15	5	
19	(Spain) Gerard Trueba	Beta	-	-	-	-	-	14	-	-	2	
20	(Spain) Pol Medina	TRS	-	-	-	-	-	15	-	-	1	
20	(Austria) Marco Mempor	TRS	-	15	-	-	-	-	-	-	1	2019 Austrian Champion

=== Women's final standings ===
Pos	Rider	Machine	FRA (France)	FRA (France)	SPA (Spain)	SPA (Spain)	AND (Andorra)	AND (Andorra)	Pts	
1	(United Kingdom) Emma Bristow	Sherco	1	1	1	1	1	1	120	
2	(Spain) Berta Abellan	Vertigo	2	2	3	3	3	2	96	
3	(Spain) Sandra Gomez	TRS	3	3	2	2	2	3	96	
4	(United States) Madeleine Hoover	Gas Gas	5	4	4	-	-	-	37	2019 United States Women's Champion
5	(France) Caroline Moreon	Sherco	4	5	5	-	-	-	35	

=== Women's 2 final standings ===
Pos	Rider	Machine	FRA (France)	FRA (France)	SPA (Spain)	SPA (Spain)	AND (Andorra)	AND (Andorra)	Pts	Notes
1	(France) Naomi Monnier	Beta	1	2	4	2	1	1	107	
2	(United Kingdom) Alicia Robinson	Beta	4	4	2	1	2	2	97	
3	(Italy) Carla Rabino	Beta	2	1	1	4	5	3	96	
4	(France) Lenna Volpe	TRS	3	3	3	3	4	4	86	2019 French Women's Champion
5	(Italy) Martina Gallieni	TRS	5	5	5	5	3	5	70	
6	(France) Marine Aurieres	Gas Gas	6	6	6	6	7	7	58	
7	(Spain) Laia Pi	Sherco	7	7	7	7	8	8	56	
8	(Portugal) Mariana Afonso	Sherco	8	8	8	8	8	8	48	
9	(Portugal) Sofia Porfirio	TRS	-	-	9	9	10	9	27	
10	(Andorra) Alexia Llado	Sherco	-	-	-	-	9	10	13	
