= 2021 FIM World Motorcycle Trials season =

The 2021 World trials season consisted of six trials events with six main classes: Trial GP, Trial2, Trial 125cc, Trial E-Cup, Women's Trial and Women's Trial2.

The X-Trial season was contested over two events in November and was won by Toni Bou, who won both events and claimed his 15th consecutive title.

== Season summary ==
Toni Bou won his 15th consecutive Trial and X-Trial championships.

Laia Sanz returned to Trials after 7 years and won her 14th title.

== 2021 World trials season calendar ==
Round	Date	Trial	Venue	Trial GP	Trial 2	Trial 125cc	Trial E-Cup	Women's	Women's 2
1	13 June	Italy	Tolmezzo	1) Toni Bou; 2) Adam Raga; 3) Matteo Grattarola	1) Jack Peace; 2) Toby Martyn; 3) Lorenzo Gandola	1) Jack Dance; 2) Harry Hemingway; 3) David Fabian	-	1) Laia Sanz; 2) Emma Bristow; 3) Berta Abellan	1) Sara Trentini; 2) Andrea Sofia Rabino; 3) Alicia Robinson
2	14 June	Italy	Tolmezzo	1) Takahisa Fujinami; 2) Toni Bou; 3) Adam Raga	1) Toby Martyn; 2) Jack Peace; 3) Aniol Gelabert Roura	1) Harry Turner; 2) Jack Dance; 3) Adria Mercade Canals	-	1) Emma Bristow; 2) Laia Sanz; 3) Berta Abellan	1) Andrea Sofia Rabino; 2) Sara Trentini; 3) Kaytlyn Adshead
3	3 July	France	Charade	1) Toni Bou; 2) Matteo Grattarola; 3) Adam Raga	1) Jack Peace; 2) Toby Martyn; 3) Billy Green	-	1) Gael Chatagno; 2) Julien Perret; 3) Martin Riobo Hermelo	1) Emma Bristow; 2) Laia Sanz; 3) Berta Abellan	1) Andrea Sofia Rabino; 2) Sara Trentini; 3) Kaytlyn Adshead
4	20 August	Andorra	Sant Juliá de Loriá	1) Toni Bou; 2) Adam Raga; 3) Matteo Grattarola	1) Toby Martyn; 2) Jack Peace; 3) Lorenzo Gandola	1) Harry Hemingway; 2) Jack Dance; 3) Harry Turner	1) Gael Chatagno; 2) Julien Perret; 3) Martin Riobo Hermelo	-	-
5	21 August	Andorra	Sant Juliá de Loriá	1) Adam Raga; 2) Jaime Busto; 3) Toni Bou	1) Aniol Gelabert Roura; 2) Arnau Farre; 3) Jack Peace	1) Jack Dance; 2) Harry Hemingway; 3) Harry Turner	1) Gael Chatagno; 2) Julien Perret; 3) Martin Pochez	-	-
6	28 August	France	Cahors	1) Toni Bou; 2) Adam Raga; 3) Jaime Busto	1) Toby Martyn; 2) Aniol Gelabert Roulas; 3) Alexandre Ferrer	1) Jack Dance; 2) Gaudi Vall Ingles; 3) Rodney Bereiter	1) Gael Chatagno; 2) Julien Perret; 3) Martin Pochez	-	-
7	12 September	Spain	Pobladura de las Regueras	1) Toni Bou; 2) Adam Raga; 3) Jaime Busto	1) Aniol Gelabert Roura; 2) Pablo Suarez Jambrina; 3) Toby Martyn	-	-	1) Laia Sanz; 2) Berta Abellan; 3) Emma Bristow	1) Petra Budinova; 2) Andrea Sofia Rabino; 3) Sophia Ter Jung
8	13 September	Spain	Pobladura de las Regueras	1) Toni Bou; 2) Jaime Busto; 3) Adam Raga	1) Lorenzo Gandola; 2) Pablo Suarez Jambrina; 3) Toby Martyn	-	-	1) Emma Bristow; 2) Laia Sanz; 3) Berta Abellan	1) Andrea Sofia Rabino; 2) Kaytlyn Adshead; 3) Sophia Ter Jung
9	17 September	Portugal	Gouveia	1) Toni Bou; 2) Adam Raga; 3) Jaime Busto	1) Lorenzo Gandola; 2) Alexandre Ferrer; 3) Toby Martyn	-	-	1) Laia Sanz; 2) Berta Abellan; 3) Emma Bristow	1) Andrea Sofia Rabino; 2) Sara Trentini; 3) Kaytlyn Adshead

=== Trial GP final standings ===
Pos	Rider	Machine	Pts	Notes
1	(Spain) Toni Bou	Montesa	172	
2	(Spain) Adam Raga	TRS	150	
3	(Spain) Jaime Busto	Vertigo	122	
4	(Italy) Matteo Grattarola	Beta	112	
5	(Spain) Miquel Gelabert	Gas Gas	95	
6	(Japan) Takahisa Fujinami	Montesa	94	
7	(Spain) Gabriel Marcelli	Montesa	92	
8	(Spain) Jeroni Fajardo	Sherco	80	
9	(Spain) Jorge Casales	Gas Gas	57	
10	(France) Benoit Bincaz	Beta	38	
11	(United Kingdom) Dan Peace	Sherco	20	
12	(France) Teo Colairo	Beta	0	

=== Women's Trial final standings ===
Pos	Rider	Machine	Pts	Notes
1	(Spain) Laia Sanz	Gas Gas	111	
2	(United Kingdom) Emma Bristow	Sherco	107	
3	(Spain) Berta Abellan	Vertigo	94	
4	(Spain) Sandra Gomez Cantero	TRRS	74	
5	(Norway) Ingveig Hakonsen	TRRS	64	
6	(France) Naomi Monnier	Beta	61	
7	(United Kingdom) Alice Minta	Scorpa	55	
8	(Germany) Vivian Wachs	TRRS	46	
9	(Italy) Martina Gallieni	TRRS	39	
10	(Germany) Julie Steinert	TRRS	31	

=== Trial E-Cup final standings ===
Pos	Rider	Machine	Pts	Notes
1	(France) Gael Chatagno	Electric Motion	80	
2	(France) Julien Perret		68	
3	(Spain) Martin Riobo Hermelo	Electric Motion	56	
4	(France) Martin Pochez	Electric Motion	43	
5	(Czech Republic) Marek Wünsch	TP Project	35	
6	(United Kingdom) Samuel Robinson	Electric Motion	11	

== 2021 World X-Trials season calendar ==
Round	Date	Trial	Venue	X-Trials
1	6 November	Andorra	Andorra La Vella	1) Toni Bou; 2) Adam Raga; 3) Jaime Busto
2	21 November	Spain	Barcelona	1) Toni Bou; 2) Gabriel Marcelli; 3) Adam Raga

=== X-Trial final standings ===
Pos	Rider	Machine	Pts	Notes
1	(Spain) Antoni Bou	Montesa	40	
2	(Spain) Adam Raga	TRS	27	
3	(Spain) Jaime Busto	Vertigo	21	
4	(Spain) Gabriel Marcelli	Montesa	18	
5	(Italy) Matteo Grattarola	Beta	13	
6	(Spain) Miquel Gelabert	Gas Gas	10	
7	(Spain) Jeroni Fajardo	Sherco	9	
8	(United Kingdom) Toby Martyn	TRRS	4	
9	(Spain) Jorge Casales	Gas Gas	2	
