= 2019 FIM World Motorcycle Trials season =

The 2019 World trials season consisted of eight trials events with four main classes: Trial GP, Trial 2, Women's and Women's 2. It began on 26 May, with round one in Pietramurata, Italy and ended with round 8 in La Nucia, Spain on 22 September.

== Season summary ==
Toni Bou would claim his thirteenth outdoor World trials championship in 2019.

Gabriel Marcelli would claim his first World outdoor title, winning the Trial 2 championship in 2019.

Emma Bristow would claim her sixth outdoor World trials championship in 2019.

== 2019 World trials season calendar ==
Round	Date	Trial	Venue	Trial GP	Trial 2	Women's	Women's 2
1	26 May	Italy	Pietramurata	1) Toni Bou; 2) Adam Raga; 3) Benoit Bincaz	1) Matteo Grattarola; 2) Jack Peace; 3) Toby Martyn		
2	8 June	Japan	Twin Ring Motegi	1) Toni Bou; 2) Adam Raga; 3) Takahisa Fujinami	1) Matteo Grattarola; 2) Toby Martyn; 3) Gabriel Marcelli	1) Emma Bristow; 2) Sara Gomez; 3) Ingveig Hakonsen	
3	9 June	Japan	Twin Ring Motegi	1) Toni Bou; 2) Adam Raga; 3) Takahisa Fujinami	1) Alexandre Ferrer; 2) Gabriel Marcelli; 3) Matteo Grattarola	1) Emma Bristow; 2) Berta Abellan; 3) Neus Murcia	
4	23 June	Netherlands	Zelhem	1) Toni Bou; 2) Adam Raga; 3) Takahisa Fujinami	1) Gabriel Marcelli; 2) Matteo Grattarola; 3) Toby Martyn		
5	30 June	Belgium	Comblain Au Pont	1) Toni Bou; 2) Adam Raga; 3) Takahisa Fujinami	1) Matteo Grattarola; 2) Toby Martyn; 3) Gabriel Marcelli		
6	14 July	Portugal	Gouveia	1) Toni Bou; 2) Adam Raga; 3) Jorge Casales	1) Gabriel Marcelli; 2) Alexandre Ferrer; 3) Lorenzo Gandola	1) Emma Bristow; 2) Berta Abellan; 3) Sara Gomez	1) Vivien Wachs; 2) Alice Minta; 3) Lenna Volpe
7	21 July	France	Auron	1) Toni Bou; 2) Jaime Busto; 3) Adam Raga	1) Alexandre Ferrer; 2) Gabriel Marcelli; 3) Matteo Grattarola	1) Emma Bristow; 2) Berta Abellan; 3) Sara Gomez	1) Vivien Wachs; 2) Alice Minta; 3) Lenna Volpe
8	22 September	Spain	La Nucia	1) Toni Bou; 2) Adam Raga; 3) Takahisa Fujinami	1) Gabriel Marcelli; 2) Luca Petrella; 3) Aniol Gelabert	1) Emma Bristow; 2) Berta Abellan; 3) Sara Gomez	1) Alicia Robinson; 2) Alice Minta; 3) Caroline Moreon

=== Scoring system ===
Points were awarded to the top fifteen finishers in each class. All ten rounds counted for the World GP and Trial 2 classes, all five rounds in Women's and all three in Women's 2 classes were counted.

Position	1st	2nd	3rd	4th	5th	6th	7th	8th	9th	10th	11th	12th	13th	14th	15th
Points	20	17	15	13	11	10	9	8	7	6	5	4	3	2	1

=== Trial GP final standings ===
Pos	Rider	Machine	ITA (Italy)	JAP (Japan)	JAP (Japan)	NED (Netherlands)	BEL (Belgium)	POR (Portugal)	FRA (France)	SPA (Spain)	Pts	Notes
1	(Spain) Toni Bou	Montesa	1	1	1	1	1	1	1	1	160	
2	(Spain) Adam Raga	TRS	2	2	2	2	2	2	3	2	134	member of Spanish 2019 TDN winning team
3	(Japan) Takahisa Fujinami	Montesa	5	3	3	3	3	4	4	3	112	
4	(Spain) Jaime Busto	Vertigo	4	6	7	4	4	6	2	5	96	
5	(Spain) Jorge Casales	Vertigo	12	7	5	5	5	3	5	7	81	
6	(United Kingdom) James Dabill	Beta	8	4	4	6	7	5	7	9	80	
7	(France) Benoit Bincaz	Beta	3	10	10	8	6	8	8	8	69	
8	(Spain) Miquel Gelabert	Sherco	6	8	8	12	9	7	6	6	66	
9	(Germany) Franz Kadlec	TRS	7	5	6	7	8	11	9	11	64	2019 German Champion
10	(United Kingdom) Jack Price	Gas Gas	10	9	9	9	12	10	10	10	49	
11	(United Kingdom) Dan Peace	Sherco	13	12	11	14	11	12	13	12	30	
12	(Spain) Arnau Farre	TRS	11	-	-	13	10	9	11	-	26	
13	(Spain) Jeroni Fajardo	Gas Gas	-	-	-	-	-	-	-	4	13	member of Spanish 2019 TDN winning team
14	(Spain) Oriol Noguera	TRS	9	-	-	11	-	-	-	-	12	
15	(Italy) Andrea Riva	TRS	14	-	-	10	-	-	12	-	12	
16	(Japan) Kenichi Kuroyama	Yamaha	-	11	12	-	-	-	-	-	9	
17	(Japan) Tomoyuki Ogawa	HRC Honda	-	14	13	-	-	-	-	-	5	2019 Japanese Champion
18	(Japan) Fumitaka Nozaki	Yamaha	-	13	14	-	-	-	-	-	5	

=== Trial 2 final standings ===
Pos	Rider	Machine	ITA (Italy)	JAP (Japan)	JAP (Japan)	NED (Netherlands)	BEL (Belgium)	POR (Portugal)	FRA (France)	SPA (Spain)	Pts	Notes
1	(Spain) Gabriel Marcelli	Montesa	5	3	2	1	3	1	2	1	135	
2	(Italy) Matteo Grattarola	Honda	1	1	3	2	1	7	3	5	127	2019 Italian Champion, 2018 Trial 2 Champ
3	(France) Alexandre Ferrer	Sherco	6	5	1	6	6	2	1	8	106	
4	(United Kingdom) Toby Martyn	Beta	3	2	4	3	2	10	4	6	106	
5	(Spain) Francesc Moret	Montesa	8	4	5	4	5	5	7	4	89	
6	(Spain) Aniol Gelabert	Scorpa	7	8	6	7	4	9	5	3	82	
7	(United Kingdom) Jack Peace	Sherco	2	9	7	11	7	4	6	7	79	
8	(Italy) Luca Petrella	Beta	4	6	10	5	12	6	10	2	77	
9	(Italy) Lorenzo Gandola	Vertigo	13	12	9	14	14	3	13	10	42	
10	(Norway) Hakon Pedersen	Gas Gas	9	13	13	10	9	15	9	9	41	2019 Norwegian Champion
11	(Norway) Sondre Haga	TRS	11	10	11	9	13	8	-	13	37	
12	(France) Teo Colairo	Gas Gas	-	11	12	12	11	-	8	12	30	
13	(United Kingdom) Billy Green	Montesa	12	14	8	-	8	11	14	-	29	
14	(Spain) Pablo Suarez	Gas Gas	14	-	-	8	10	13	11	-	24	
15	(France) Julien Perret	Gas Gas	15	-	-	-	-	12	12	14	11	
16	(Japan) Akira Shibata	Vertigo	-	7	15	-	-	-	-	-	10	
17	(Italy) Sergio Piardi	Beta	10	15	-	15	-	-	15	-	9	
18	(Spain) Eric Miquel	TRS	-	-	-	-	15	-	-	11	6	
19	(Italy) Pietro Petrangeli	Sherco	-	-	-	13	-	-	-	-	3	
20	(Spain) Sergio Ribau	Sherco	-	-	-	-	-	14	-	-	2	
21	(Japan) Seiya Ujikawa	Gas Gas	-	-	14	-	-	-	-	-	2	
22	(Venezuela) David Avendano	Vertigo	-	-	-	-	-	-	-	15	1	

=== Women's final standings ===
Pos	Rider	Machine	NE (Japan)	NE (Japan)	MN (Portugal)	MN (France)	CO (Spain)	Pts	Notes
1	(United Kingdom) Emma Bristow	Sherco	1	1	1	1	1	100	
2	(Spain) Berta Abellan	Vertigo	4	2	2	2	2	81	member of Spanish 2019 TDN winning team
3	(Spain) Sara Gomez	TRS	2	4	3	3	3	75	member of Spanish 2019 TDN winning team
4	(Spain) Neus Murcia	Gas Gas	5	3	6	5	6	57	2019 Spanish Women's Champion
5	(Norway) Ingveig Hakonsen	TRS	3	6	5	7	5	56	2019 Norwegian Women's Champion
6	(Spain) Maria Giro	Montesa	6	5	8	4	7	51	
7	(Italy) Alex Brancati	Beta	8	7	4	6	8	48	2019 Italian Women's Champion
8	(Germany) Sarah Bauer	TRS	7	8	9	8	4	45	2019 German Women's Champion
9	(United States) Madeleine Hoover	Gas Gas	10	10	7	9	10	34	2019 US NATC Champion
10	(Germany) Jule Steinert	TRS	11	11	10	10	9	29	
11	(Japan) Aya Nishimura	Beta	9	9	-	-	-	14	2019 Japanese Women's Champion
12	(Norway) Erika Melchior	Sherco	12	12	-	-	-	8	

=== Women's 2 final standings ===
Pos	Rider	Machine	POR (Portugal)	FRA (France)	SPA (Spain)	Pts	Notes
1	(Germany) Vivien Wachs	TRS	1	1	5	51	
2	(United Kingdom) Alice Minta	Scorpa	2	2	2	51	
3	(France) Caroline Moreon	Sherco	4	4	3	41	
4	(France) Lenna Volpe	Sherco	3	3	8	38	2019 French Women's Champion
5	(United Kingdom) Alicia Robinson	Beta	6	9	1	37	
6	(Norway) Erika Melchior	Sherco	7	6	4	32	
7	(Germany) Sophia Ter Jung	TRS	5	7	6	30	
8	(Italy) Martina Gallieni	TRS	10	8	7	23	
9	(Norway) Seline Meling	Beta	8	-	9	15	
10	(Spain) Eva Munoz	Sherco	12	10	11	15	
11	(United Kingdom) Gabby Whitham	Beta	9	-	10	13	
12	(France) Naomi Monnier	Beta	-	5	-	11	
13	(Australia) Lille Yiatrou	TRS	13	12	13	10	
14	(Portugal) Sofia Porfirio	TRS	14	-	12	6	
15	(Portugal) Leonor Moreira	Gas Gas	-	11	-	5	
16	(Portugal) Rita Vieira	Ossa	11	-	-	5	2019 Portuguese Consagrados Champion
17	(Australia) Jenna Lupo	Gas Gas	-	-	14	2	
18	(Portugal) Martina Afonso	Sherco	15	-	-	1	
