= Trial des Nations =

Motorcycle trials competition

Trial des Nations is the most important Motorcycle trials competition of national teams organized by the International Motorcycling Federation (FIM). After the experiment of Myślenice, Poland, the first official trial of Nations was held in Canzo, Italy, and managed by the Moto Club Canzo. The Italian club also proposed to maintain this event as a yearly competition. Since then, it has been held annually at different countries. Each team is composed of four riders in the male category, and since 2000, three riders in the female category. The team with fewest total penalties is awarded the title. An Indoor Trial des Nations championship was also disputed during 7 years, from 2002 to 2008, and was restarted again in 2012 with the new name FIM X-trial des nations.

The FIM made a significant change in 1995. They recognized that they could not grow the sport having only a single-competition class structure, given that most entrants were not professional trials riders. The FIM added a second, class called the “B” class, or "International", with the “A” class being intended for the top teams of the world. There are typically 5 countries entered in the prestigious “A” class, and about 15 countries in the “B” class.

The competition has been dominated by Spain winning 21 out of 31 tournaments in male category.

== Winners ==
Year	Host Country	City	Winners (Men)	Riders	Winners (International)	Riders	Winners (Women)	Riders
1984	Poland	Myślenice	France	Philippe Berlatier (Italjet)				
1984	Poland	Myślenice	France	Gilles Burgat (Fantic)				
1984	Poland	Myślenice	France	Fred Michaud (Fantic)				
1984	Poland	Myślenice	France	Thierry Michaud (Fantic)				
1985	Italy	Piano Rancio	France	Philippe Berlatier (Aprilia)				
1985	Italy	Piano Rancio	France	Gilles Burgat (Yamaha)				
1985	Italy	Piano Rancio	France	Pascal Couturier (Beta)				
1985	Italy	Piano Rancio	France	Thierry Michaud (Fantic)				
1986	Austria	Limberg	France	Philippe Berlatier (Aprilia)				
1986	Austria	Limberg	France	Gilles Burgat (Yamaha)				
1986	Austria	Limberg	France	Pascal Couturier (JCM)				
1986	Austria	Limberg	France	Thierry Michaud (Fantic)				
1987	Finland	Tampere	Italy	Diego Bosis (Aprilia)				
1987	Finland	Tampere	Italy	Renato Chiaberto (Beta)				
1987	Finland	Tampere	Italy	Carlo Franco (Beta)				
1987	Finland	Tampere	Italy	Donato Miglio (Garelli)				
1988	Czechoslovakia	Revnice	France	Philippe Berlatier (Beta)				
1988	Czechoslovakia	Revnice	France	Pascal Couturier (JCM)				
1988	Czechoslovakia	Revnice	France	Thierry Girard (Yamaha)				
1988	Czechoslovakia	Revnice	France	Thierry Michaud (Fantic)				
1989	Belgium	Bertrix	Spain	Amós Bilbao (Fantic)				
1989	Belgium	Bertrix	Spain	Andreu Codina (Gas Gas)				
1989	Belgium	Bertrix	Spain	Gabino Renales (Montesa)				
1989	Belgium	Bertrix	Spain	Jordi Tarrés (Beta)				
1990	France	Massais	France	Philippe Berlatier (Beta)				
1990	France	Massais	France	Bruno Camozzi (Fantic)				
1990	France	Massais	France	Pascal Couturier (Beta)				
1990	France	Massais	France	Thierry Girard (Montesa)				
1991	Germany	Grossheubach	Spain	Amós Bilbao (Gas Gas)				
1991	Germany	Grossheubach	Spain	Marc Colomer (Montesa)				
1991	Germany	Grossheubach	Spain	Gabino Renales (Montesa)				
1991	Germany	Grossheubach	Spain	Jordi Tarrés (Beta)				
1992	United States	Watkins Glen	Spain	Amós Bilbao (Gas Gas)				
1992	United States	Watkins Glen	Spain	Marc Colomer (Montesa)				
1992	United States	Watkins Glen	Spain	Joan Pons (Beta)				
1992	United States	Watkins Glen	Spain	Jordi Tarrés (Beta)				
1993	Ireland	Kilbroney Park	Spain	Amós Bilbao (Montesa)				
1993	Ireland	Kilbroney Park	Spain	Marc Colomer (Beta)				
1993	Ireland	Kilbroney Park	Spain	Joan Pons (Gas Gas)				
1993	Ireland	Kilbroney Park	Spain	Jordi Tarrés (Gas Gas)				
1994	Andorra	La Rabassa	Spain	Marc Colomer (Beta)				
1994	Andorra	La Rabassa	Spain	Angel Garcia (Gas Gas)				
1994	Andorra	La Rabassa	Spain	Joan Pons (Gas Gas)				
1994	Andorra	La Rabassa	Spain	Jordi Tarrés (Gas Gas)				
1995	Austria	Piesting	Spain	Amós Bilbao (Beta)	Netherlands	Jan Cepicka (Scorpa)		
1995	Austria	Piesting	Spain	Marc Colomer (Montesa)	Netherlands	Alex Van Den Broek (Montesa)		
1995	Austria	Piesting	Spain	Joan Pons (Gas Gas)	Netherlands	Rene Opstals (Fantic)		
1995	Austria	Piesting	Spain	Jordi Tarrés (Gas Gas)	Netherlands	Mark Van Der Linden (Beta)		
1996	Sweden	Kinna	Spain	Amós Bilbao (Gas Gas)	Germany	Horst Hoffmann (Fantic)		
1996	Sweden	Kinna	Spain	Marc Colomer (Montesa)	Germany	Jens Ter Jung (Gas Gas)		
1996	Sweden	Kinna	Spain	Marcel Justribó (Beta)	Germany	Andreas Lettenbichler (Beta)		
1996	Sweden	Kinna	Spain	Jordi Tarrés (Gas Gas)	Germany	Bjorn Wisniewski (Beta)		
1997	Isle of Man	Douglas	Great Britain	Dan Clark (Beta)	Germany	Markus Gorig (Gas Gas)		
1997	Isle of Man	Douglas	Great Britain	Steve Colley (Gas Gas)	Germany	Jens Ter Jung (Gas Gas)		
1997	Isle of Man	Douglas	Great Britain	Graham Jarvis (Scorpa)	Germany	Andreas Lettenbichler (Gas Gas)		
1997	Isle of Man	Douglas	Great Britain	Dougie Lampkin (Beta)	Germany	Bjorn Wisniewski (Beta)		
1998	Italy	Chiesa Valmalenco	Spain	Amós Bilbao (Gas Gas)	Germany	Andreas Lettenbichler (Montesa)		
1998	Italy	Chiesa Valmalenco	Spain	Marc Colomer (Montesa)	Germany	Jens Ter Jung (Gas Gas)		
1998	Italy	Chiesa Valmalenco	Spain	Marcel Justribó (Gas Gas)	Germany	Carsten Stranghoner (Montesa)		
1998	Italy	Chiesa Valmalenco	Spain	Jordi Pascuet (Gas Gas)	Germany	Bjorn Wisniewski (Beta)		
1999	Luxembourg	Ettelbruck	Great Britain	Steve Colley (Gas Gas)	Belgium	Olivier Colson (Gas Gas)		
1999	Luxembourg	Ettelbruck	Great Britain	Martin Crosswaite (Gas Gas)	Belgium	Hugues Lambion (Beta)		
1999	Luxembourg	Ettelbruck	Great Britain	Graham Jarvis (Sherco)	Belgium	Arnaud Dermine (Scorpa)		
1999	Luxembourg	Ettelbruck	Great Britain	Dougie Lampkin (Beta)	Belgium	Michael Vukcevic (Sherco)		
2000	Spain	Seva	Spain	Albert Cabestany (Beta)	United States	Geoff Aaron (Beta)	Spain	Dolores Sanchez (Gas Gas)
2000	Spain	Seva	Spain	Marc Colomer (Montesa)	United States	Ray Peters (Sherco)	Spain	Laia Sanz (Gas Gas)
2000	Spain	Seva	Spain	Marc Freixa (Gas Gas)	United States	Jess Kempkes (Gas Gas)	Spain	
2000	Spain	Seva	Spain	Marcel Justribó (Montesa)	United States	Cory Pincock (Gas Gas)	Spain	
2001	France	La Bresse	Spain	Albert Cabestany (Beta)	Germany	Markus Gorig (Beta)	Norway	Kjersty Fla (Sherco)
2001	France	La Bresse	Spain	Marc Colomer (Gas Gas)	Germany	Carsten Stranghoner (Sherco)	Norway	Linda Meyer (Gas Gas)
2001	France	La Bresse	Spain	Marc Freixa (Sherco)	Germany	Andreas Lettenbichler (Sherco)	Norway	Siri Minken (Gas Gas)
2001	France	La Bresse	Spain	Adam Raga (Gas Gas)	Germany	Jens Ter Jung (Gas Gas)	Norway	
2002	Portugal	Paços de Ferreira	Great Britain	Steve Colley (Gas Gas)	Norway	Lars Erik Fremstad (Montesa)	Spain	Merce Ribera (Sherco)
2002	Portugal	Paços de Ferreira	Great Britain	Sam Connor (Gas Gas)	Norway	Kenneth Larsen (Montesa)	Spain	Dolores Sanchez (Beta)
2002	Portugal	Paços de Ferreira	Great Britain	Graham Jarvis (Sherco)	Norway	Henning Hauge Nilsen (Scorpa)	Spain	Laia Sanz (Beta)
2002	Portugal	Paços de Ferreira	Great Britain	Dougie Lampkin (Montesa)	Norway	Ola Andre Svendsen (Gas Gas)	Spain	
2003	Italy	Lavarone	Great Britain	Sam Connor (Gas Gas)	Finland	Henri Himmanen (Montesa)	Germany	Iris Kramer (Gas Gas)
2003	Italy	Lavarone	Great Britain	Ben Hemingway (Beta)	Finland	Samuli Magga (Gas Gas)	Germany	Ute Kramer (Gas Gas)
2003	Italy	Lavarone	Great Britain	Graham Jarvis (Sherco)	Finland	Jussi Jokinen (Gas Gas)	Germany	Rosita Leotta (Beta)
2003	Italy	Lavarone	Great Britain	Dougie Lampkin (Montesa)	Finland	Saku Suvantu (Beta)	Germany	
2004	Spain	Córdoba	Spain	Albert Cabestany (Beta)	Ireland	Gareth Andrews (Beta)	France	Claire Bertrand (Gas Gas)
2004	Spain	Córdoba	Spain	Jeroni Fajardo (Gas Gas)	Ireland	Robert Crawford (Beta)	France	Marilyne Journet (Gas Gas)
2004	Spain	Córdoba	Spain	Marc Freixa (Montesa)	Ireland	Michael Burton (Gas Gas)	France	Marlene Satge (Sherco)
2004	Spain	Córdoba	Spain	Adam Raga (Gas Gas)	Ireland	Andrew Perry (Sherco)	France	
2005	Italy	Sestriere	Spain	Toni Bou (Beta)	United States	Geoff Aaron (Gas Gas)	Germany	Iris Kramer (Gas Gas)
2005	Italy	Sestriere	Spain	Albert Cabestany (Sherco)	United States	Cody Webb (Gas Gas)	Germany	Rosita Leotta (Gas Gas)
2005	Italy	Sestriere	Spain	Marc Freixa (Montesa)	United States	Chris Florin (Gas Gas)	Germany	Sabrina Weindl (Gas Gas)
2005	Italy	Sestriere	Spain	Adam Raga (Gas Gas)	United States	Keith Wineland (Sherco)	Germany	
2006	Brittany	Bréal-sous-Montfort; Breal-Moñforzh	Spain	Toni Bou (Beta)	Ireland	Gareth Andrews (Beta)	Great Britain	Maria Conway (Beta)
2006	Brittany	Bréal-sous-Montfort; Breal-Moñforzh	Spain	Albert Cabestany (Sherco)	Ireland	Robert Crawford (Gas Gas)	Great Britain	Rebekah Cook (Gas Gas)
2006	Brittany	Bréal-sous-Montfort; Breal-Moñforzh	Spain	Jeroni Fajardo (Gas Gas)	Ireland	Michael Burton (Gas Gas)	Great Britain	Donna Fox (Sherco)
2006	Brittany	Bréal-sous-Montfort; Breal-Moñforzh	Spain	Adam Raga (Gas Gas)	Ireland	Andrew Perry (Gas Gas)	Great Britain	
2007	Isle of Man	Douglas	Spain	Toni Bou (Montesa)	Belgium	Jan Cardinaels (Montesa)	Great Britain	Maria Conway (Beta)
2007	Isle of Man	Douglas	Spain	Albert Cabestany (Sherco)	Belgium	Jordane Vandekateele (Gas Gas)	Great Britain	Rebekah Cook (Gas Gas)
2007	Isle of Man	Douglas	Spain	Jeroni Fajardo (Beta)	Belgium	Maxime Mathy (Gas Gas)	Great Britain	Donna Fox (Sherco)
2007	Isle of Man	Douglas	Spain	Adam Raga (Gas Gas)	Belgium	Michael Vukcevic (Sherco)	Great Britain	
2008	Andorra	La Rabassa	Spain	Toni Bou (Montesa)	Czech Republic	Pavel Balas (Gas Gas)	Spain	Mireia Conde (Beta)
2008	Andorra	La Rabassa	Spain	Albert Cabestany (Sherco)	Czech Republic	Petr Masek (Montesa)	Spain	Sandra Gómez (Gas Gas)
2008	Andorra	La Rabassa	Spain	Jeroni Fajardo (Beta)	Czech Republic	Martin Křoustek (Beta)	Spain	Laia Sanz (Montesa)
2008	Andorra	La Rabassa	Spain	Adam Raga (Gas Gas)	Czech Republic	Jiri Svoboda (Beta)	Spain	
2009	Italy	Darfo Boario Terme	Spain	Toni Bou (Montesa)	Germany	Jan Junklewitz (Sherco)	Great Britain	Emma Bristow (Gas Gas)
2009	Italy	Darfo Boario Terme	Spain	Albert Cabestany (Sherco)	Germany	Jochen Schafer (Gas Gas)	Great Britain	Joanne Coles (Gas Gas)
2009	Italy	Darfo Boario Terme	Spain	Jeroni Fajardo (Beta)	Germany	Timon Oster (Beta)	Great Britain	Rebekah Cook (Sherco)
2009	Italy	Darfo Boario Terme	Spain	Adam Raga (Gas Gas)	Germany	Carsten Stranghoner (Gas Gas)	Great Britain	
2010	Poland	Myślenice	Spain	Toni Bou (Montesa)	Norway	Ib Andersen (Gas Gas)	Spain	Mireia Conde (Beta)
2010	Poland	Myślenice	Spain	Adam Raga (Gas Gas)	Norway	Moi Mardon (Beta)	Spain	Sandra Gómez (Gas Gas)
2010	Poland	Myślenice	Spain	Albert Cabestany (Sherco)	Norway	Kristoffer Leirvaag (Sherco)	Spain	Laia Sanz (Montesa)
2010	Poland	Myślenice	Spain	Jeroni Fajardo (Beta)	Norway	Håkon Pedersen (Sherco)	Spain	
2011	Italy	Tolmezzo	Spain	Toni Bou (Montesa)	Germany	Mirco Kammel (Beta)	Spain	Mireia Conde (Beta)
2011	Italy	Tolmezzo	Spain	Adam Raga (Gas Gas)	Germany	Jan Peters (Beta)	Spain	Sandra Gómez (Gas Gas)
2011	Italy	Tolmezzo	Spain	Albert Cabestany (Sherco)	Germany	Christian Kregeloh (Gas Gas)	Spain	Laia Sanz (Montesa)
2011	Italy	Tolmezzo	Spain	Jeroni Fajardo (Beta)	Germany	Carsten Stranghoner (Gas Gas)	Spain	
2012	Switzerland	Moutier	Spain	Toni Bou (Montesa)	Czech Republic	Pavel Balas (Gas Gas)	Spain	Mireia Conde (Beta)
2012	Switzerland	Moutier	Spain	Adam Raga (Gas Gas)	Czech Republic	Martin Matějíček (Gas Gas)	Spain	Sandra Gómez (Gas Gas)
2012	Switzerland	Moutier	Spain	Albert Cabestany (Sherco)	Czech Republic	Martin Křoustek (Beta)	Spain	Laia Sanz (Gas Gas)
2012	Switzerland	Moutier	Spain	Jeroni Fajardo (Beta)	Czech Republic	Jiri Svoboda (Beta)	Spain	
2013	France	La Châtre	Spain	Toni Bou (Montesa)	Germany	Jan Junklewitz (Sherco)	Great Britain	Emma Bristow (Sherco)
2013	France	La Châtre	Spain	Adam Raga (Gas Gas)	Germany	Christian Kregeloh (Ossa)	Great Britain	Joanne Coles (Gas Gas)
2013	France	La Châtre	Spain	Albert Cabestany (Sherco)	Germany	Mirco Kammel (TRS)	Great Britain	Rebekah Cook (Beta)
2013	France	La Châtre	Spain	Jeroni Fajardo (Beta)	Germany	Jan Peters (Beta)	Great Britain	
2014	Andorra	Sant Julià de Lòria	Spain	Toni Bou (Montesa)	Germany	Jan Junklewitz (Sherco)	Great Britain	Emma Bristow (Sherco)
2014	Andorra	Sant Julià de Lòria	Spain	Adam Raga (Gas Gas)	Germany	Mirco Kammel (TRS)	Great Britain	Joanne Coles (Gas Gas)
2014	Andorra	Sant Julià de Lòria	Spain	Albert Cabestany (Sherco)	Germany	Franz Kadlec (Beta)	Great Britain	Rebekah Cook (Beta)
2014	Andorra	Sant Julià de Lòria	Spain	Jeroni Fajardo (Beta)	Germany	Jan Peters (Beta)	Great Britain	
2015	Spain	Tarragona	Spain	Toni Bou (Montesa)	Czech Republic	Martin Křoustek (Beta)	Great Britain	Emma Bristow (Sherco)
2015	Spain	Tarragona	Spain	Adam Raga (TRS)	Czech Republic	Jiri Svoboda (Beta)	Great Britain	Rebekah Cook (TRS)
2015	Spain	Tarragona	Spain	Albert Cabestany (Sherco)	Czech Republic	Martin Matějíček (Gas Gas)	Great Britain	Donna Fox (Sherco)
2015	Spain	Tarragona	Spain	Jeroni Fajardo (Beta)	Czech Republic	Marek Wunsch (Gas Gas)	Great Britain	
2016	France	Isola 2000	Spain	Toni Bou (Montesa)	Germany	Jan Junklewitz (Sherco)	Great Britain	Emma Bristow (Sherco)
2016	France	Isola 2000	Spain	Adam Raga (TRS)	Germany	Franz Kadlec (Beta)	Great Britain	Rebekah Cook (TRS)
2016	France	Isola 2000	Spain	Albert Cabestany (Sherco)	Germany	Jarmo Robrahn (Beta)	Great Britain	Donna Fox (Sherco)
2017	Spain	Baiona	Spain	Toni Bou (Montesa)	Australia	Chris Bayles (Gas Gas)	Spain	Berta Abellan (Beta)
2017	Spain	Baiona	Spain	Adam Raga (TRS)	Australia	Kyle Middleton (Gas Gas)	Spain	Maria Giro (Montesa)
2017	Spain	Baiona	Spain	Jaime Busto (Montesa)	Australia	Connor Hogan (Sherco)	Spain	Sandra Gómez (Gas Gas)
2018	Czech Republic	Sokolov	Spain	Toni Bou (Montesa)	Czech Republic	Dominik Wunsch (Gas Gas)	Great Britain	Emma Bristow (Sherco)
2018	Czech Republic	Sokolov	Spain	Jeroni Fajardo (Gas Gas)	Czech Republic	Martin Matějíček (Gas Gas)	Great Britain	Donna Fox (Montesa)
2018	Czech Republic	Sokolov	Spain	Jaime Busto (Gas Gas)	Czech Republic	Martin Křoustek (TRRS)	Great Britain	Jess Bown (Scorpa)
2019	Spain	Ibiza	Spain	Toni Bou (Montesa)	Germany	Hendrik Binder (Beta)	Spain	Sandra Gómez (TRRS)
2019	Spain	Ibiza	Spain	Adam Raga (TRRS)	Germany	Franz Kadlec (TRRS)	Spain	Berta Abellán (Vértigo)
2019	Spain	Ibiza	Spain	Jeroni Fajardo (Gas Gas)	Germany	Paul Reumschüssel (TRRS)	Spain	Neus Murcia (Gas Gas)
2021	Portugal	Gouveia	Spain	Toni Bou (Montesa)	Norway	Jarand-Matias Vold Gunvaldsen (TRRS)	Spain	Berta Abellán (Vértigo)
2021	Portugal	Gouveia	Spain	Adam Raga (TRRS)	Norway	Håkon Pedersen (Gas Gas)	Spain	Sandra Gómez (TRRS)
2021	Portugal	Gouveia	Spain	Jaime Busto (Vértigo)	Norway	Sondre Haga (Beta)	Spain	Laia Sanz (Gas Gas)
2022	Italy	Monza	Spain	Toni Bou (Montesa)	Czech Republic	Martin Křoustek (TRRS)	Spain	Berta Abellán (Scorpa)
2022	Italy	Monza	Spain	Jaime Busto (Vértigo)	Czech Republic	Martin Matějíček (Gas Gas)	Spain	Sandra Gómez (TRRS)
2022	Italy	Monza	Spain	Adam Raga (TRRS)	Czech Republic	David Fabián (Beta)	Spain	Alba Villegas (Sherco)
2023	France	Auron	Spain	Toni Bou (Montesa)	Japan	Tomoyuki Ogawa (Honda)	Great Britain	Emma Bristow (Sherco)
2023	France	Auron	Spain	Jaime Busto (Gas Gas)	Japan	Seiya Ujikawa (Honda)	Great Britain	Alice Minta (Scorpa)
2023	France	Auron	Spain	Gabriel Marcelli (Montesa)	Japan	Tsuyoshi Ogawa (Beta)	Great Britain	Kaytlyn Adshead (TRRS)
2024	Spain	Pobladura de las Regueras	Spain	Toni Bou (Montesa)	Japan	Tsuyoshi Ogawa (Beta)	Great Britain	Emma Bristow (Sherco)
2024	Spain	Pobladura de las Regueras	Spain	Gabriel Marcelli (Montesa)	Japan	Shinya Hirohata (Montesa)	Great Britain	Alice Minta (Scorpa)
2024	Spain	Pobladura de las Regueras	Spain	Adam Raga (Sherco)	Japan	Jin Kuroyama (Sherco)	Great Britain	Kaytlyn Adshead (TRRS)
2025	Italy	Tolmezzo	Spain	Toni Bou (Montesa)	United States	Josh Roper (Gas Gas)	Spain	Berta Abellán (Scorpa)
2025	Italy	Tolmezzo	Spain	Jaime Busto (Gas Gas)	United States	Alex Myers (Scorpa)	Spain	Laia Pi (Beta)
2025	Italy	Tolmezzo	Spain	Gabriel Marcelli (Montesa)	United States	Will Myers (Sherco)	Spain	Daniela Hernando (Beta)
2026	Spain	Arteixo	Spain	Toni Bou (Montesa)	Norway	Sondre Haga (Gas Gas)	Great Britain	Emma Bristow (Sherco)
2026	Spain	Arteixo	Spain	Jaime Busto (Beta)	Norway	Jarand Gunvaldsen (TRRS)	Great Britain	Alice Minta (Beta)
2026	Spain	Arteixo	Spain	Gabriel Marcelli (Montesa)	Norway	Jone Sandvik (Sherco)	Great Britain	Kaytlyn Adshead (TRRS)
Year	Host Country	City	Winners (Men)	Riders	Winners (International)	Riders	Winners (Women)	Riders

== Titles per country (male) ==
As of September 2026, the following ranking shows the countries with most Trial des Nations wins, in male category:

Rank	Country	Titles (male category)
1	Spain	32
2	France	5
3	UK	4
4	Italy	1

== Titles per country (female) ==
As of September 2026, the following ranking shows the countries with most Trial des Nations wins, in female category:

Rank	Country	Titles (female category)
1	Spain	11
=	UK	11
3	Germany	2
4	France	1
=	Norway	1
