= Roberto Puente =

Spanish footballer (born 1986)

Personal information
- Full name: Roberto García Puente
- Date of birth: 28 December 1986 (age 39)
- Place of birth: Quintana de Fuseros, Spain
- Height: 1.80 m (5 ft 11 in)
- Position: Striker

Team information
- Current team: Toreno

Senior career*
Years	Team	Apps	(Gls)
2005–2007	CA Bembibre		
2007–2009	Ponferradina B		
2009–2011	Barco		
2011–2013	CA Bembibre		
2013–2020	Atlético Astorga	162	(101)
2020–2022	CA Bembibre	45	(17)
2022–	Toreno	25	(23)

International career
- Castile and León
- * Club domestic league appearances and goals

Roberto García Puente (born 28 December 1986) is a Spanish footballer who plays as a striker for Toreno.

== Early life ==
Puente started playing football at the age of seven to eight.

== Club career ==
In 2013, Puente signed for Spanish side Atlético Astorga, where he was regarded as one of the club's most important players. He helped them earn promotion.

== International career ==
Puente played for the Castile and León autonomous football team.

== Style of play ==
Puente mainly operates as a striker and is known for his aggression.

== Post-playing career ==
Puente has worked as a bus driver.

== Personal life ==
Puente is a native of Quintana de Fuseros, Spain.
