= Colinas =

Colinas may refer to:

== People ==
- Antonio Colinas (born 1946), Spanish writer
- Julen Colinas (born 1988), Spanish footballer

== Places ==
Brazil

- Colinas, Maranhão
- Colinas, Rio Grande do Sul
- Colinas do Tocantins
- Colinas do Sul, Goiás

Spain

- Colinas del Campo de Martín Moro Toledano

== See also ==
- Las Colinas
