= Urdiales de Colinas =

- Minor local entity
- Location within Province of León Location within Castile and León Location within Spain
- Coordinates: 42°46′27″N 6°22′44″W
- Country: Spain
- Autonomous community: Castile and León
- Province: Province of León
- Municipality: Igüeña
- Elevation: 1,242 m (4,075 ft)

Population
  - Total: 0

Urdiales de Colinas is a deserted locality and minor local entity located in the municipality of Igüeña, in the province of León, Castile and León, Spain. As of 2020, it has a population of 0.
