= Rodrigatos de las Regueras =

- Minor local entity
- Location within Province of León Location within Castile and León Location within Spain
- Coordinates: 42°42′19″N 6°14′34″W
- Country: Spain
- Autonomous community: Castile and León
- Province: Province of León
- Municipality: Igüeña
- Elevation: 1,040 m (3,410 ft)

Population
  - Total: 9

Rodrigatos de las Regueras is a minor local entity in the municipality of Igüeña, in the Province of León, Spain. As of 2020, it has a population of 9.

== Geography ==
Rodrigatos de las Regueras is located 96km west-northwest of León, Spain.
