= Tremor de Arriba =

- Minor local entity
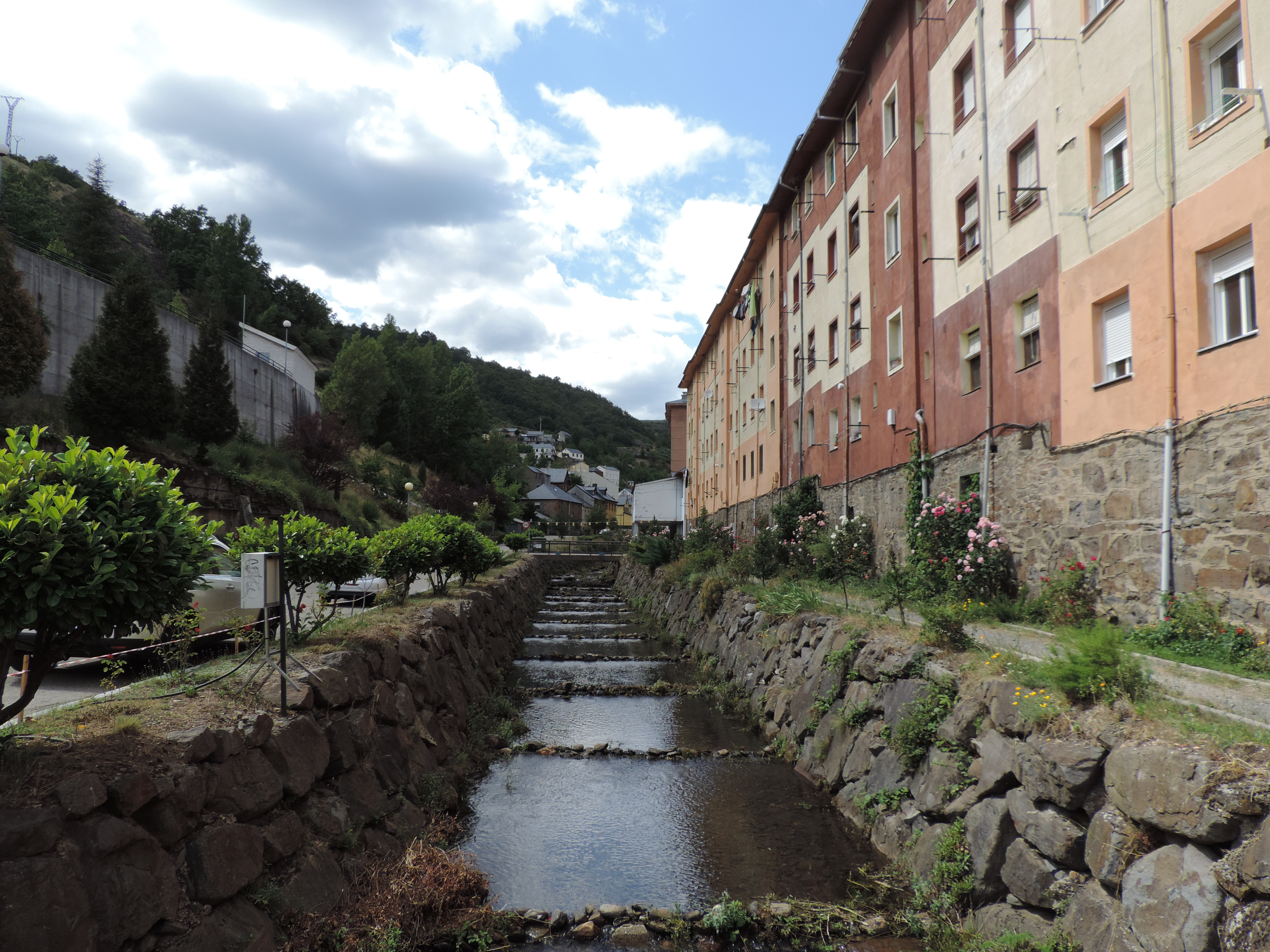

- Location within Province of León Location within Castile and León Location within Spain
- Coordinates: 42°43′36″N 6°12′31″W
- Country: Spain
- Autonomous community: Castile and León
- Province: Province of León
- Municipality: Igüeña
- Elevation: 1,033 m (3,389 ft)

Population
  - Total: 324

Tremor de Arriba is a locality and minor local entity located in the municipality of Igüeña, in the province of León, Castile and León, Spain. As of 2020, it has a population of 324.

== Geography ==
Tremor de Arriba is located 96km west-northwest of León, Spain.
