= Almagarinos =

- Minor local entity
- Location within Province of León Location within Castile and León Location within Spain
- Coordinates: 42°40′12″N 6°15′13″W
- Country: Spain
- Autonomous community: Castile and León
- Province: Province of León
- Municipality: Igüeña
- Elevation: 916 m (3,005 ft)

Population
  - Total: 72

Almagarinos is a locality and minor local entity located in the municipality of Igüeña, in the province of León, Castile and León, Spain. As of 2020, it has a population of 72.

== Geography ==
Almagarinos is located 88km west of León, Spain.
