= Espina de Tremor =

- Minor local entity
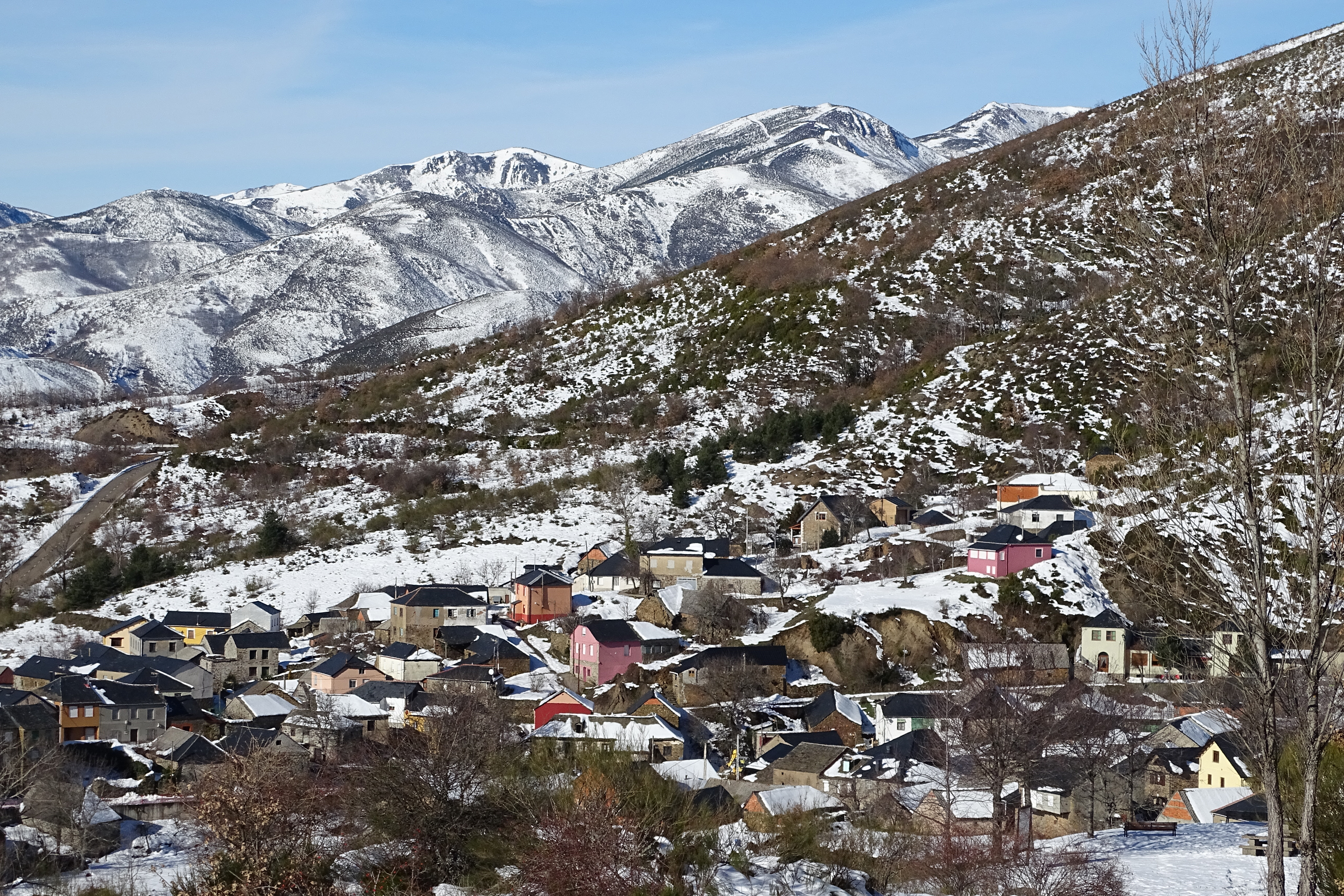

- Location within Province of León Location within Castile and León Location within Spain
- Coordinates: 42°43′38″N 6°9′18″W
- Country: Spain
- Autonomous community: Castile and León
- Province: Province of León
- Municipality: Igüeña
- Elevation: 1,241 m (4,072 ft)

Population
  - Total: 44

Espina de Tremor is a locality and minor local entity located in the municipality of Igüeña, in the province of León, Castile and León, Spain. As of 2020, it has a population of 44.

== Geography ==
Espina de Tremor is located 79km west-northwest of León, Spain.
