= Los Montes de la Ermita =

- Minor local entity
- Location within Province of León Location within Castile and León Location within Spain
- Coordinates: 42°46′44″N 6°20′20″W
- Country: Spain
- Autonomous community: Castile and León
- Province: Province of León
- Municipality: Igüeña
- Elevation: 1,299 m (4,262 ft)

Population
  - Total: 0

Los Montes de la Ermita is a deserted locality and minor local entity located in the municipality of Igüeña, in the province of León, Castile and León, Spain. As of 2020, it has a population of 0.

== Geography ==
Los Montes de la Ermita is located 110km west-northwest of León, Spain.
