= Igüeña =

Igüeña Igüeña
- Coat of arms

- Location within Spain
- Coordinates: 42°43′44″N 6°16′35″W
- Country: Spain
- Autonomous community: Castile and León
- Province: León
- Comarca: El Bierzo
- Municipality: Igüeña

Government
  - Mayor: Antonio Alider Presa Iglesias (PSOE)

Area
  - Total: 206.10 km^{2} (79.58 sq mi)
- Elevation: 911 m (2,989 ft)

Population (2025-01-01)
  - Total: 1,012
  - Density: 4.910/km^{2} (12.72/sq mi)
- Demonym: igüeñés
- Time zone: UTC+1 (CET)
  - Summer (DST): UTC+2 (CEST)
- Postal Code: 24312
- Telephone prefix: 987
- Climate: Csb

Igüeña (Spanish pronunciation: [iˈɣweɲa]) is a village and municipality located in the region of El Bierzo (province of León, Castile and León, Spain).

== Population ==
According to the 2010 census (INE), Igüeña's population was 1,424 (728 males and 696 females).

== Villages ==
Igüeña's municipality has ten villages, two of which are uninhabited (Astur-Leonese / Spanish):

- Almagarinos
- Colinas / Colinas del Campo de Martín Moro
- Espina / Espina de Tremor
- Igüeña
- Puebladura / Pobladura de las Regueras
- Quintana de Fuseiros / Quintana de Fuseros
- Rodrigatos / Rodrigatos de las Regueras
- Tremor d'Arriba / Tremor de Arriba
- Los Montes / Los Montes de la Ermita (uninhabited)
- Urdiales / Urdiales de Colinas (uninhabited)
