= Sandra Gómez (motorcycle trials rider) =

Spanish motorcycle racer

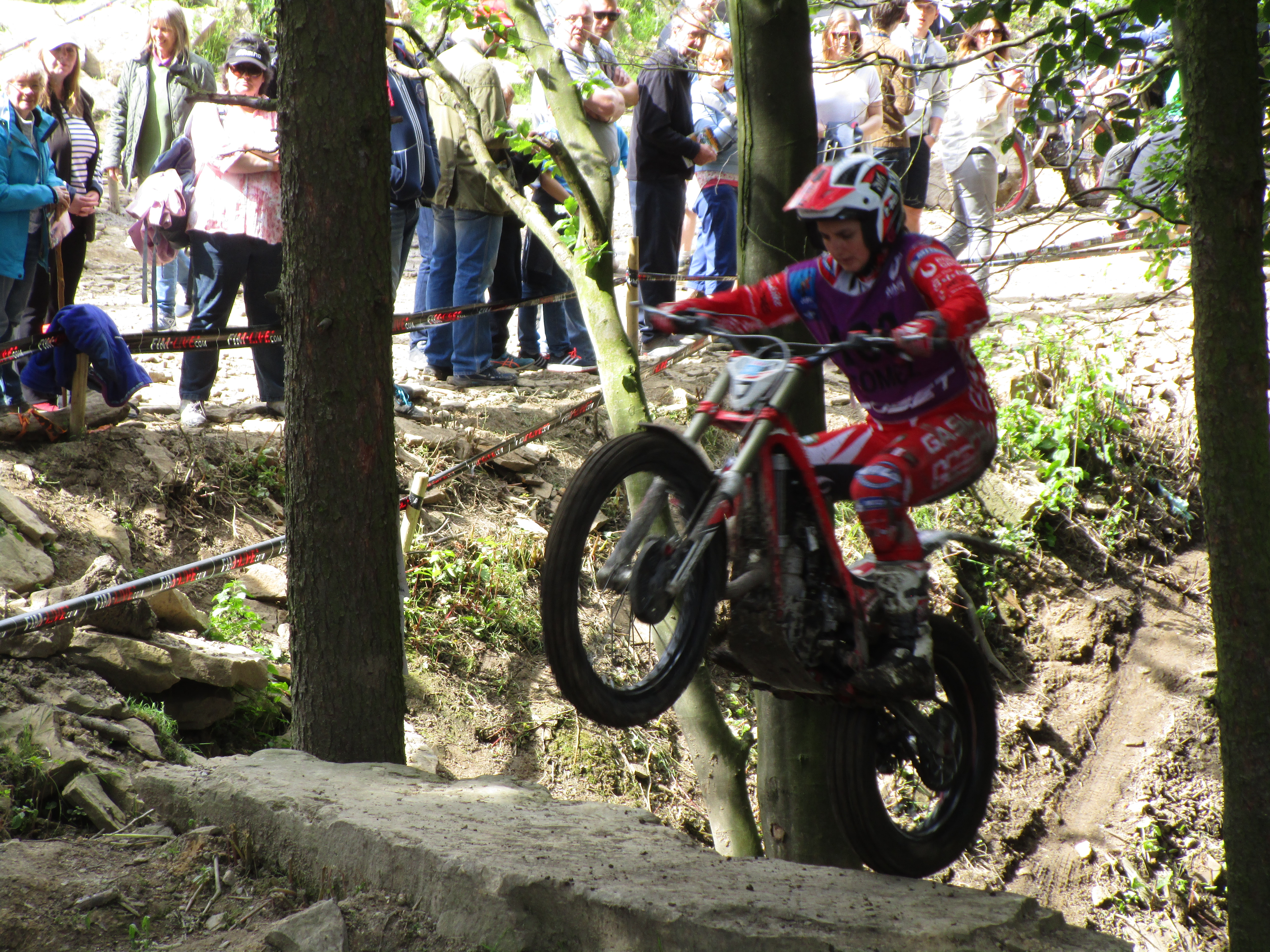
- FIM World Trials 2016, Tong UK
- Nationality: Spanish
- Born: 23 January 1993 (age 33); Madrid, Spain
- Current team: TRS & Husqvarna

Sandra Gómez Cantero (born in Madrid, Spain), is a Spanish Women's International motorcycle trials rider. Gomez has twice been Spanish Women's Trials Champion and a member of the Spanish Trial Des Nations winning team on five occasions, including 2017.

== Biography ==
Gómez first competed in Spanish National series in 2003, finishing in fourth position. Though quite young and competing against more experienced riders, she put in consistent performances throughout the next several years.

In 2008, Gómez finished third in the Spanish National Women's A class behind reigning Women's World Champion Laia Sanz and Mireia Conde. This earned her a place on the Spanish Trial Des Nations team alongside Sanz and Conde. The event was held in Andorra and the Spanish team came home victorious.

2009 was a carbon copy of the previous season, ending with the same 1-2-3 in the Spanish Series. Gomez had secured herself what was to be a regular place on the TDN team though this year they were bested by the British team.

A third and two second places saw Gómez step up to second place in the 2010 Spanish series, once again behind Sanz. She also added her second TDN title as the familiar team of Sanz, Gómez and Conde won the event, this year held in Poland.

2011 was to be an excellent year, as Gómez won all three national events to become Spanish Champion for the first time, then the team headed off to Italy and repeated their TDN victory once more.

Mireia Conde held off Gómez in 2012, by a mere four points, but they still shared the silverware, along with Sanz, winning the TDN Women's title for the third year running in Switzerland. Gómez also featured prominently in the FIM World Women's Trials Championship throughout the year, taking runner-up places in Andorra and Switzerland and ending the season in third place.

After signing a deal with the Ossa factory in 2013, Gómez was second in the Spanish series behind Conde, this time by six points, but she made no mistake in 2014 taking the wins in all three rounds to regain her Spanish Women's title. She also placed third in the FIM World Championships after being on the podium for three out of the four rounds.

In 2015, Gómez slipped back to eighth in the World standings.

Moving up another step, Gómez ended the 2016 season as the second highest ranked female trials rider in the world, finishing runner-up to Emma Bristow in the FIM World Trials Championship. A feat she repeated in 2017, along with adding another TDN title to her list after the Spanish team stopped the British from taking a fifth straight TDN victory.

Starting out 2018 with a strong second place in the opening FIM World Women's Championship round held in Japan, Gómez continued to put in good placings including a podium in France, and ended the season with second place in the Championship behind Bristow.

== Spanish Women's Trials Championship ==
Year	Class	Team	1	2	3	4	5	6	Points	Rank
2007	Spanish Women's A	Gas Gas	SQE; 5	VAL; 6	MON; 6	SOT; 4			44	5th
2009	Spanish Women's A	Gas Gas	VIL; 2	SAN; 5	LAP; 3				43	3rd
2010	Spanish Women's A	Gas Gas	CAS; 3	POB; 2	CAI; 2				49	2nd
2011	Spanish Women's A	Gas Gas	TON; 1	POB; 1	POB; 1				60	1st
2012	Spanish Women's A	Gas Gas	POS; 2	VIL; 2	VAL; 2				51	2nd
2013	Spanish Women's A	Ossa	BOC; 2	POB; 1	LAN; 2	CAB; 2			71	2nd
2014	Spanish Women's A	Ossa	PAR; 1	CAN; 1	POB; 1				60	1st
2016	Spanish Women's A	Ossa	LAN -	STJ -	BOC -	POB; 1	CAR; 1	VAL -	40	7th

== Women's European Trials Championship ==
Year	Team	1	2	3	Points	Rank
2007	Gas Gas	SPA; 14	ITA; 14	NOR; 12	8	16th
2009	Gas Gas	POL; 5	ITA; 5	CZE; 5	33	5th
2010	Gas Gas	ITA -	AND; 4	CZE -	13	11th
2011	Gas Gas	ITA; 5	GER; 8	CZE; 5	30	5th
2013	Ossa	CZE; 2	NOR -	SWE -	85	9th

== Women's World Trials Championship ==
Year	Team	1	2	3	4	5	Points	Rank
2008	Gas Gas	LUX -	SPA; 13	AND; 8			11	13th
2009	Gas Gas	AND; 9	FRA; 7	ITA; 7			18	8th
2010	Beta	FRA; 6	CZE; 4	POL; 4			26	5th
2011	Gas Gas	GER; 4	CZE; 5	ITA; 5			24	5th
2012	Gas Gas	AND; 3	AND; 2	SWI; 5	SWI; 5	SWI; 2	49	3rd
2013	Ossa	AND; 2	AND; 3	FRA; 4	FRA; 6	FRA; 4	45	4th
2014	Ossa	BEL; 3	SPA; 2	SPA; 5	AND; 2		49	3rd
2015	Scorpa	CZE; 3	CZE; 4	SPA -	SPA -	SPA -	28	8th
2016	Gas Gas	GBR; 3	GBR; 4	ITA; 2	ITA; 6	FRA; 2	62	2nd
2017	Gas Gas	USA; 4	USA; 2	CZE; 2	ITA; 3		62	2nd
2018	Gas Gas	JAP; 2	JAP; 7	FRA; 3	GBR; 6		51	2nd

== Honors ==
- Spanish Women's Trials Champion 2011, 2014
- Women's TDN Winning Team Member 2008, 2010, 2011, 2012, 2017, 2019, 2021

== Related Reading ==
- FIM Trial European Championship
- FIM Trial World Championship
