= Colinas del Campo de Martín Moro Toledano =

Colinas del Campo de Martín Moro Toledano Colinas
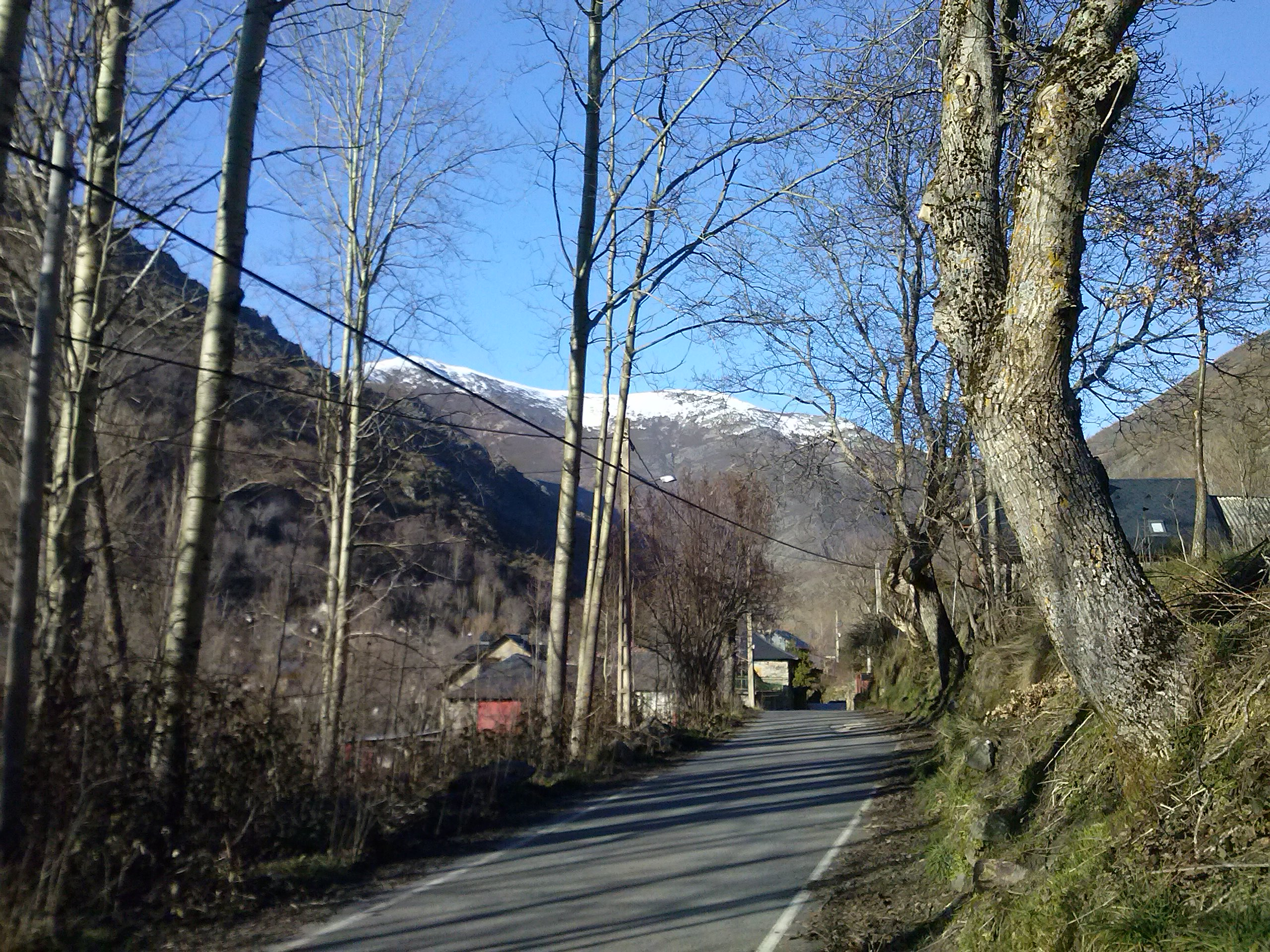

- Location within Spain
- Coordinates: 42°46′7″N 6°17′30″W
- Country: Spain
- Autonomous community: Castile and León
- Province: León
- Comarca: El Bierzo
- Municipality: Igüeña
- Elevation: 1,087 m (3,566 ft)

Population (2017)
  - Total: 7,377
- Time zone: UTC+1 (CET)
  - Summer (DST): UTC+2 (CEST)
- Postal Code: 24313
- Telephone prefix: 987
- Climate: Csb

Colinas del Campo de Martín Moro Toledano, commonly known as Colinas del Campo or simply Colinas, is a locality in the municipality of Igüeña, in the comarca of El Bierzo, in the province of León, in the autonomous community of Castile and León, Spain.

Known officially as Colinas del Campo de Martín Moro Toledano, it is the town with the third longest administrative name in Spain.
