= Joanne Coles =

English motorcycle rider

- Nationality: (United Kingdom) British
- Born: 25 June 1992 (age 34); Derby, Derbyshire, England
- Current team: Gas Gas

Joanne Coles (born 25 June 1992) is an English woman's international motorcycle trials rider. She was British Women's Trials Champion in 2010.

== Biography ==
Coles was a member of the winning British Women's Teams at the Trial de Nations in 2009, 2013 and 2014. In 2010, she won the British Women's Trials Championship as well as being runner-up to Laia Sanz in the European Championships that year and 3rd in the World Championships.

== National Trials Championship Career ==
Year	Class	Machine	Rd 1	Rd 2	Rd 3	Rd 4	Rd 5	Rd 6	Rd 7	Points	Pos	Notes
2014	(United Kingdom) British Women's	Gas Gas	OTT; 3	SOU -	SCA; 2	ART -	STE; 3	STE -	PID -	47	7th	

== European Women's Trials Championship ==
Year	Team	1	2	3	Points	Rank
2007	Sherco	SPA; 9	ITA; 7	NOR; 11	21	8th
2008	Sherco	FRA; 4	ITA; 4	CZE; 4	36	4th
2010	Gas Gas	ITA; 3	AND; 2	CZE; 2	49	2nd

== World Trials Championship ==
Year	Team	1	2	3	4	5	Points	Rank
2008	Sherco	LUX -	SPA -	AND; 4			13	11th
2009	Gas Gas	AND; 3	FRA; 4	ITA; 5			28	4th
2010	Gas Gas	FRA; 2	CZE; 3	POL; 3			32	3rd
2013	Beta	AND -	AND -	FRA -	FRA -	FRA; 3	15	16th
2014	Beta	BEL -	SPA -	SPA -	AND; 12		4	18th

== Honors ==
- British Women's Trials Champion 2010

== See also ==
- FIM Trial World Championship
- FIM Trial European Championship
