= Quintana de Fuseros =

- Minor local entity
- Location within Province of León Location within Castile and León Location within Spain
- Coordinates: 42°42′22″N 6°19′49″W
- Country: Spain
- Autonomous community: Castile and León
- Province: Province of León
- Municipality: Igüeña
- Elevation: 941 m (3,087 ft)

Population
  - Total: 228

Quintana de Fuseros is a locality and minor local entity located in the municipality of Igüeña, in the province of León, Castile and León, Spain. As of 2020, it has a population of 228.

== Geography ==
Quintana de Fuseros is located 98km west of León, Spain.
