= Pobladura de las Regueras =

- Minor local entity
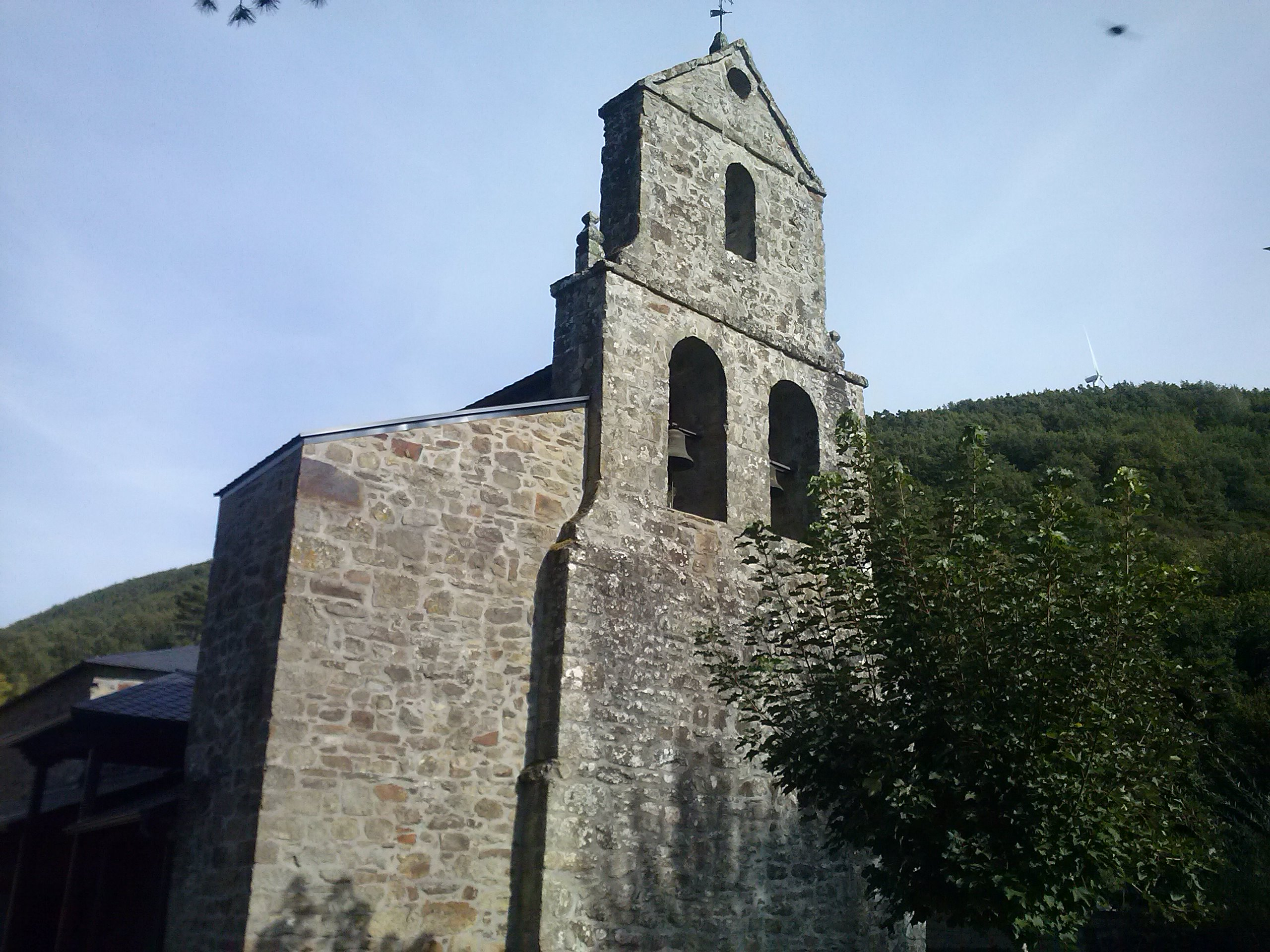

- Location within Province of León Location within Castile and León Location within Spain
- Coordinates: 42°41′48″N 6°13′49″W
- Country: Spain
- Autonomous community: Castile and León
- Province: Province of León
- Municipality: Igüeña
- Elevation: 894 m (2,933 ft)

Population (2021)
  - Total: 182

Pobladura de las Regueras is a locality and minor local entity located in the municipality of Igüeña, in the province of León, Castile and León, Spain. As of 2020, it has a population of 184.

== Geography ==
Pobladura de las Regueras is located 92km west-northwest of León, Spain.
