= Toni Bou =

Spanish motorcycle trials rider

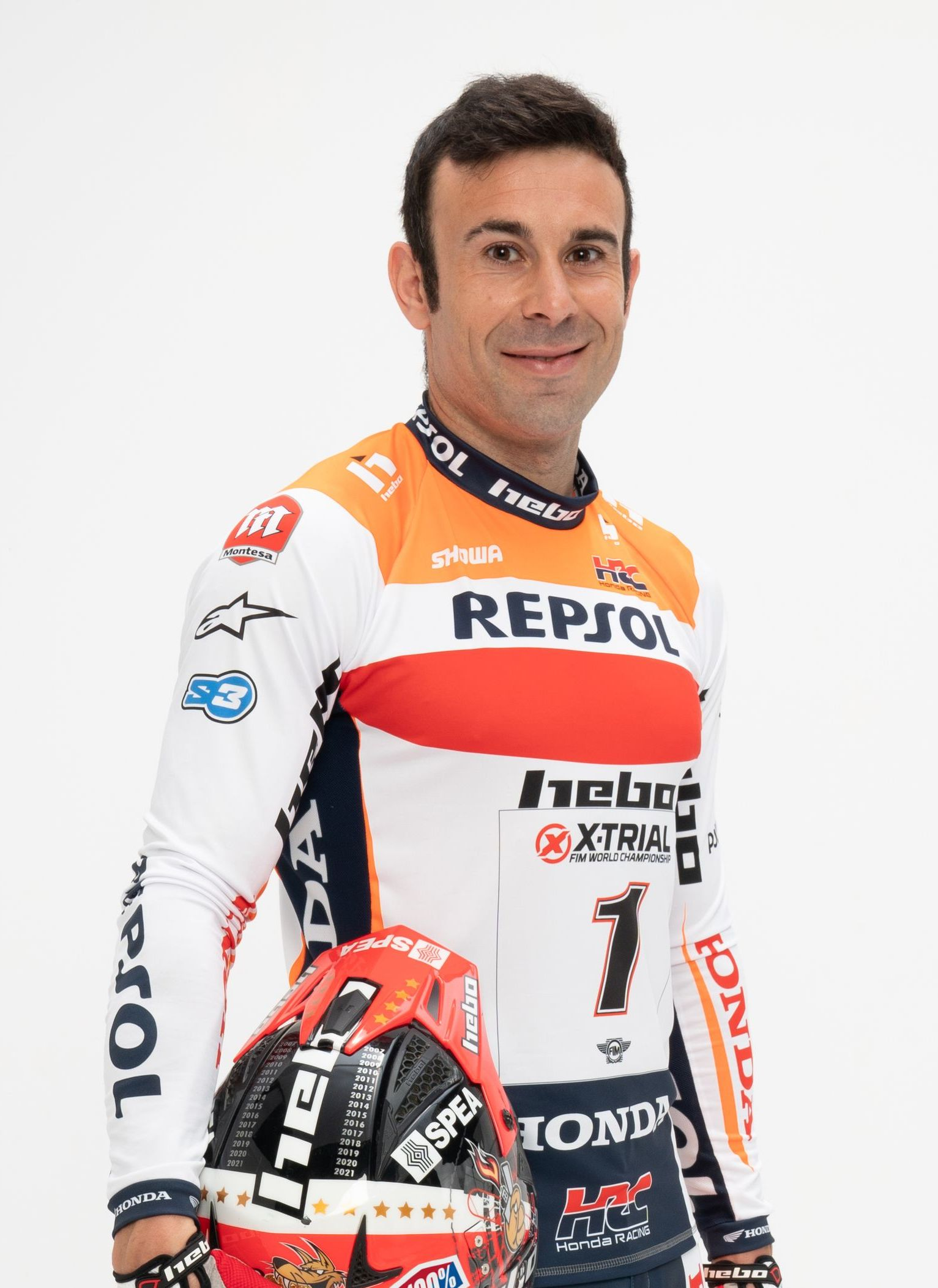
- Bou in 2022
- Nationality: Spanish
- Born: 17 October 1986 (age 40); Piera, Spain
- Current team: Repsol Montesa
- Website: www.tonibou.es

Antoni Bou i Mena (Catalan pronunciation: [ənˈtɔni ˈβɔw]) (born 17 October 1986) is a Spanish professional motorcycle trials rider. He has been the sole outdoor and indoor FIM Trial World Championship champion from 2007 to 2026. With these 40 world titles (20 outdoor and 20 indoor), he is the most successful rider in history, surpassing Dougie Lampkin (7 outdoor and 5 indoor) and Jordi Tarrés who is third with seven outdoor titles. At the age of 20 years and 5 months, Bou was the second youngest rider ever to win the World Indoor Title, and the youngest to do it on a 4-stroke motorbike.

== Biography ==
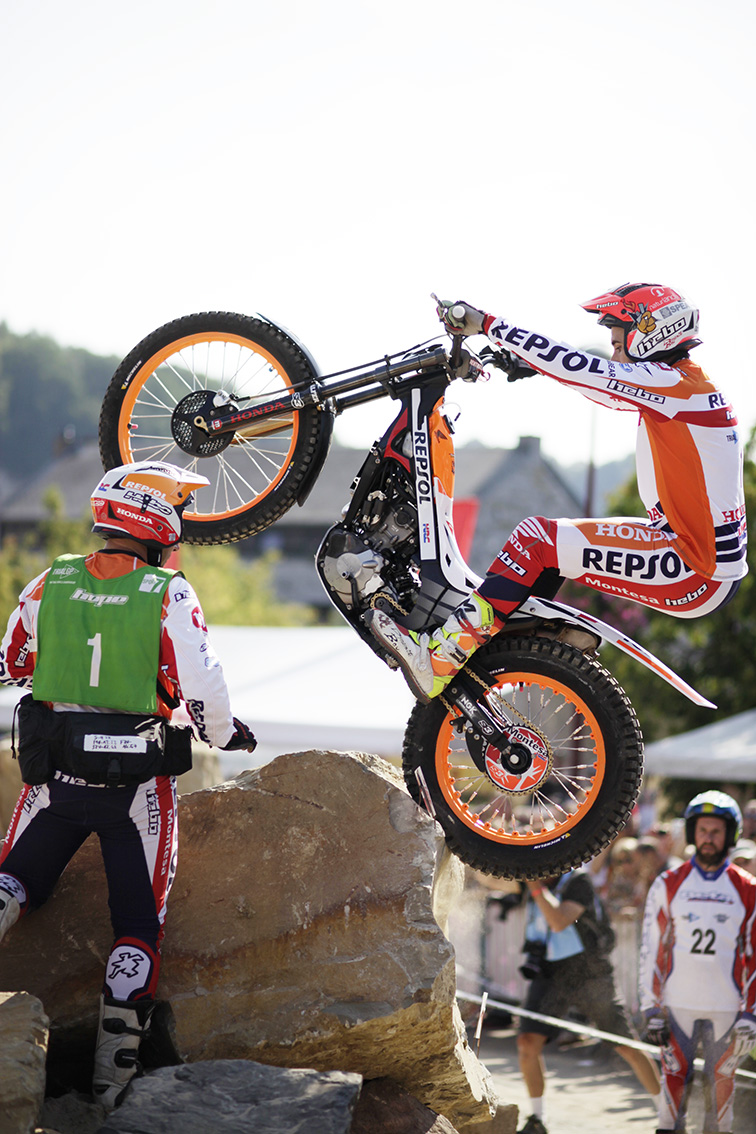
Comblain-au-Pont/Belgium 2018

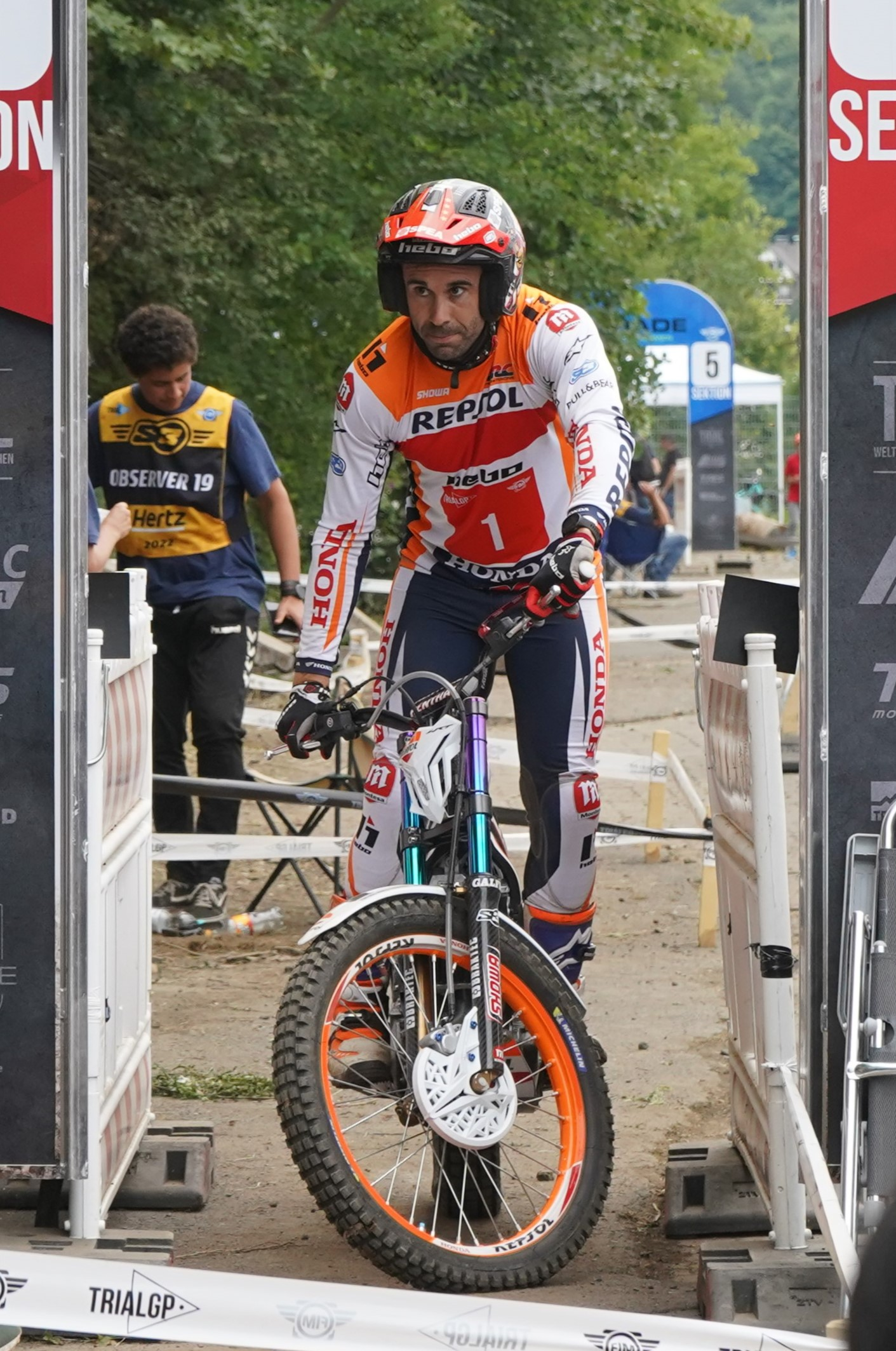
Bou at Trial GP Germany 2022

Bou's first race win was in 1999, when he obtained the Catalan Cadet Trials Championship title at the age of 12. In 2001 he was the Spanish Junior Trials Champion. His World Trials debut was a 2003 appearance in Bangor, Ireland, he ended the season 13th in the World Outdoor Trials Championship, and first in the European Outdoor Trials Championship. His first World Trials win was in 2006 when he ended fifth in the outdoor championship, and third in the indoor one. In the same year, he was the Spanish Outdoor Trials Champion.

In 2007, Bou was World Trials Champion for the first time, both in the indoor and outdoor Championships. He has repeated this feat every year from 2008 to 2025.

In terms of National Team achievements, Bou has been part of the Spanish team, that obtained Trial des Nations wins in the years 2005, 2006, 2007, 2008 and 2009. He also achieved the same in the indoor version of the competition in the years 2006, 2007 and 2008.

The 2009 season was a perfect one for Bou, achieving all his objectives, as he won all the major five titles, including the indoor and outdoor world titles, the indoor and outdoor Spanish titles, and the Trial des Nations title. This feat was only achieved once before, by Adam Raga in 2005.

At the end of the 2017 season, Bou signed an extended contract that will keep him with the Repsol Honda team until the year 2021, another three years.

In 2018, whilst facing stiff competition from his fellow countrymen Jeroni Fajardo and Adam Raga, Bou once again retained both his indoor and outdoor World titles.

Bou rides a Repsol Montesa HRC bike.

== International Trials Championship Career ==
Year	Class	Machine	Rd 1	Rd 2	Rd 3	Rd 4	Rd 5	Rd 6	Rd 7	Rd 8	Rd 9	Rd 10	Rd 11	Rd 12	Rd 13	Rd 14	Rd 15	Rd 16	Rd 17	Rd 18	Points	Pos	Notes
2007	FIM World Championship	Montesa	ESP; 1	GUA; 1	GUA; 1	FRA; 1	JPN; 1	JPN; 2	ITA; 1	POL; 1	CZE; 2	GBR; 1	AND; 1								214	1st	FIM World champion
2008	FIM World Championship	Montesa	LUX; 1	IRL; 2	USA; 2	USA; 1	JPN; 1	JPN; 1	FRA; 2	ITA; 1	CZE; 2	SWE; 2	POR; 1	ESP; 1							225	1st	FIM World champion
2009	FIM World Championship	Montesa	IRL; 2	IRL; 1	POR; 1	GBR; 1	GBR; 1	JPN; 1	JPN; 1	ITA; 3	AND; 3	ESP; 1	FRA; 4								200	1st	FIM World champion
2010	FIM World Championship	Montesa	ESP; 1	POR; 1	POR; 4	JPN; 1	JPN; 2	GBR; 1	GBR; 3	FRA; 1	RSM; 1	ITA; 1	CZE; 3								200	1st	FIM World champion
2011	FIM World Championship	Montesa	GER; 1	FRA; 3	FRA; 1	ESP; 1	AND; 1	ITA; 1	GBR; 2	JPN; 1	JPN; 3	FRA; 2	FRA; 1								204	1st	FIM World champion
2012	FIM World Championship	Montesa	FRA; 2	FRA; 1	AUS; 1	AUS; 1	JPN; 1	JPN; 1	ESP; 1	ESP; 1	AND; 1	AND; 4	ITA; 1	GBR; 1	GBR; 1						250	1st	FIM World champion
2013	FIM World Championship	Montesa	JPN; 1	JPN; 3	USA; 2	USA; 2	AND; 2	AND; 1	ESP; 1	ITA; 1	CZE; 2	GBR; 1	GBR; 1	FRA; 3	FRA; 1						238	1st	FIM World champion
2014	FIM World Championship	Montesa	AUS; 2	AUS; 1	JPN; 2	JPN; 2	EUR -	EUR; 2	ITA; 1	BEL; 1	GBR; 1	GBR; 1	FRA; 2	ESP; 1	ESP; 1						225	1st	FIM World champion
2015	FIM World Championship	Montesa	JPN; 1	JPN; 1	CZE; 1	CZE; 1	SWE; 1	SWE; 1	GBR; 1	GBR; 1	FRA; 1	FRA; 2	AND; 2	AND; 2	USA; 1	USA; 1	POR; 1	POR; 1	ESP; 2	ESP; 2	345	1st	FIM World champion
2016	FIM World Championship	Montesa	SPA; 2	SPA; 1	JPN; 2	JPN; 1	GER; 1	GER; 1	AND; 1	AND; 1	FRA; 1	FRA; 3	BEL; 1	GBR; 1	GBR; 1	ITA; 1	ITA; 1				289	1st	FIM World champion
2017	FIM World Championship	Montesa	SPA; 1	JPN; 1	JPN; 1	AND; 3	FRA; 1	GBR; 1	USA; 1	USA; 1	CZE; 2	ITA; 1									192	1st	FIM World champion
2018	FIM World Championship	Montesa	SPA; 1	JPN; 4	JPN; 2	AND; 1	POR; 1	FRA; 1	BEL; 1	GBR; 1	ITA; 1										170	1st	FIM World champion
2019	FIM World Championship	Montesa	ITA; 1	JPN; 1	JPN; 1	NED; 1	BEL; 1	POR; 1	FRA; 1	ESP; 1											160	1st	FIM World champion
2020	FIM World Championship	Montesa	FRA; 1	FRA; 3	ESP; 1	ESP; 1	AND; 2	AND; 1	ITA; 1	ITA; 1											152	1st	FIM World champion
2021	FIM World Championship	Montesa	ITA; 1	ITA; 2	FRA; 1	AND; 1	AND; 3	FRA; 1	ESP; 1	ESP; 1	POR; 1										172	1st	FIM World champion
2022	FIM World Championship	Montesa	SPA; 2	SPA; 1	AND; 2	AND; 1	GER; 1	GER; 1	BEL; 1	FRA; 1	ITA; 2	ITA; 1									191	1st	FIM World champion
2023	FIM World Championship	Montesa	SPA; 2	SPA; 1	POR; 1	POR; 2	JPN; 1	JPN; 2	RSM; 1	RSM; 1	AND; 1	AND; 1	ITA; 1	ITA; 1	FRA; 1	FRA; 1					271	1st	FIM World champion
2024	FIM World Championship	Montesa	JPN; 1	JPN; 1	AND; 1	AND; 1	ITA; 1	ITA; 2	GER; 1	GER; 1	BEL; 1	FRA; 1	ESP; 1	ESP; 1							237	1st	FIM World champion
2025	FIM World Championship	Montesa	ESP; 1	ESP; 2	POR; 1	POR; 1	JPN; 1	JPN; 1	FRA; 1	FRA; 1	RSM; 1	RSM; 1	USA; 1	USA; 2	GBR; 1	GBR; 1					556	1st	FIM World champion

(*) Season still in progress.

== World Indoor Trials Championship Career ==
Year	Team	1	2	3	4	5	6	7	8	Points	Rank
2007	Montesa	ESP; 1	RUS; 1	FRA; 6	ESP; 1	POR; 1	ITA; 2	ESP; 2	ESP; 2	67	1st
2008	Montesa	FRA; 1	ESP; 2	ESP; 1	ITA; 1	ESP; 1				48	1st
2009	Montesa	GBR; 1	FRA; 2	ESP; 1	ITA; 1	ESP; 1				38	1st
2010	Montesa	GBR; 1	FRA; 2	ESP; 1	ESP; 1	ESP; 1				95	1st
2011	Montesa	ITA; 1	FRA; 1	ESP; 1	SUI; 1	ESP; 1	ITA; 1			120	1st
2012	Montesa	FRA; 1	SUI; 1	FRA; 1	ESP; 1	ESP; 1	ITA; 1	FRA; 1		140	1st
2013	Montesa	GBR; 1	ESP; 1	ESP; 1	GER; 1	FRA; 1				100	1st
2014	Montesa	GBR; 1	FRA; 1	ESP; 1	ITA; 1	ESP; 1				100	1st
2015	Montesa	GBR; 1	FRA; 1	FRA; 2	ESP; 1	AUT; 1	ESP; 3			107	1st
2016	Montesa	GBR; 2	ESP; 1	FRA; 1	AUT; 1					75	1st
2017	Montesa	ESP; 1	AUT; 1	FRA; 1	FRA; 1					80	1st
2018	Montesa	VEN; 1	MON; 1	TOU; 1	STR; 1	BAR; 1	PAR; 5	BUD -		106	1st
2019	Montesa	HUN; 1	BAR; 2**	BIL; 1	GRA; 1	MAR; 1	AND; 1			100	1st
2020	Montesa	REU; 1	REN; 1	BUD; 1	BAR; 1	BIL; 1				100	1st
2021	Montesa	AND; 1	BAR; 1							40	1st
2022	Montesa	NIC; 1	CHA; 1	MAD; 1	BAR; 1	AND; 2				104	1st
2023	Montesa	BAR; 1	WIE; 2	PAM; 1	BOR; 1	AND; 1	MAD; 1	VEN; 1		127	1st
2024	Montesa	BAR; 1	CHA; 1	NIC; 1	GEN; 1	AND; 1	TAL; 4	PAM; 1		128	1st
2025	Montesa	MAD; 2	CHA; 1	CLE; 1	BAR; 1	STA; 1	WIE; 1	CAH; 2	TAL; 1	135	1st

(*) Season still in progress.

(**) Worst result discounted.

== Honours ==
- Spanish Trials Champion 2006, 2009, 2011, 2012, 2013, 2014, 2015, 2016, 2017, 2018, 2019
- Spanish Indoor Trials Champion 2008, 2009, 2010, 2011, 2012, 2013, 2014, 2015, 2016, 2017, 2018
- FIM European youth cup Champion 2002
- FIM European Trials Champion 2003
- FIM World Trials Champion 2007, 2008, 2009, 2010, 2011, 2012, 2013, 2014, 2015, 2016, 2017, 2018, 2019, 2020, 2021, 2022, 2023, 2024, 2025, 2026
- FIM World Indoor Trials Champion 2007, 2008, 2009, 2010, 2011, 2012, 2013, 2014, 2015, 2016, 2017, 2018, 2019, 2020, 2021, 2022, 2023, 2024, 2025, 2026
- Member of Spanish Trial des Nations winning team 2005, 2006, 2007, 2008, 2009, 2010, 2011, 2012, 2013, 2014, 2015, 2016, 2017, 2018, 2019, 2021, 2022, 2023, 2024, 2025, 2026
- Member of Spanish Indoor Trial des Nations winning team 2006, 2007, 2008, 2012, 2015, 2017, 2018, 2019, 2020, 2025, 2026
