= Jeroni Fajardo =

Spanish motorcycle racer

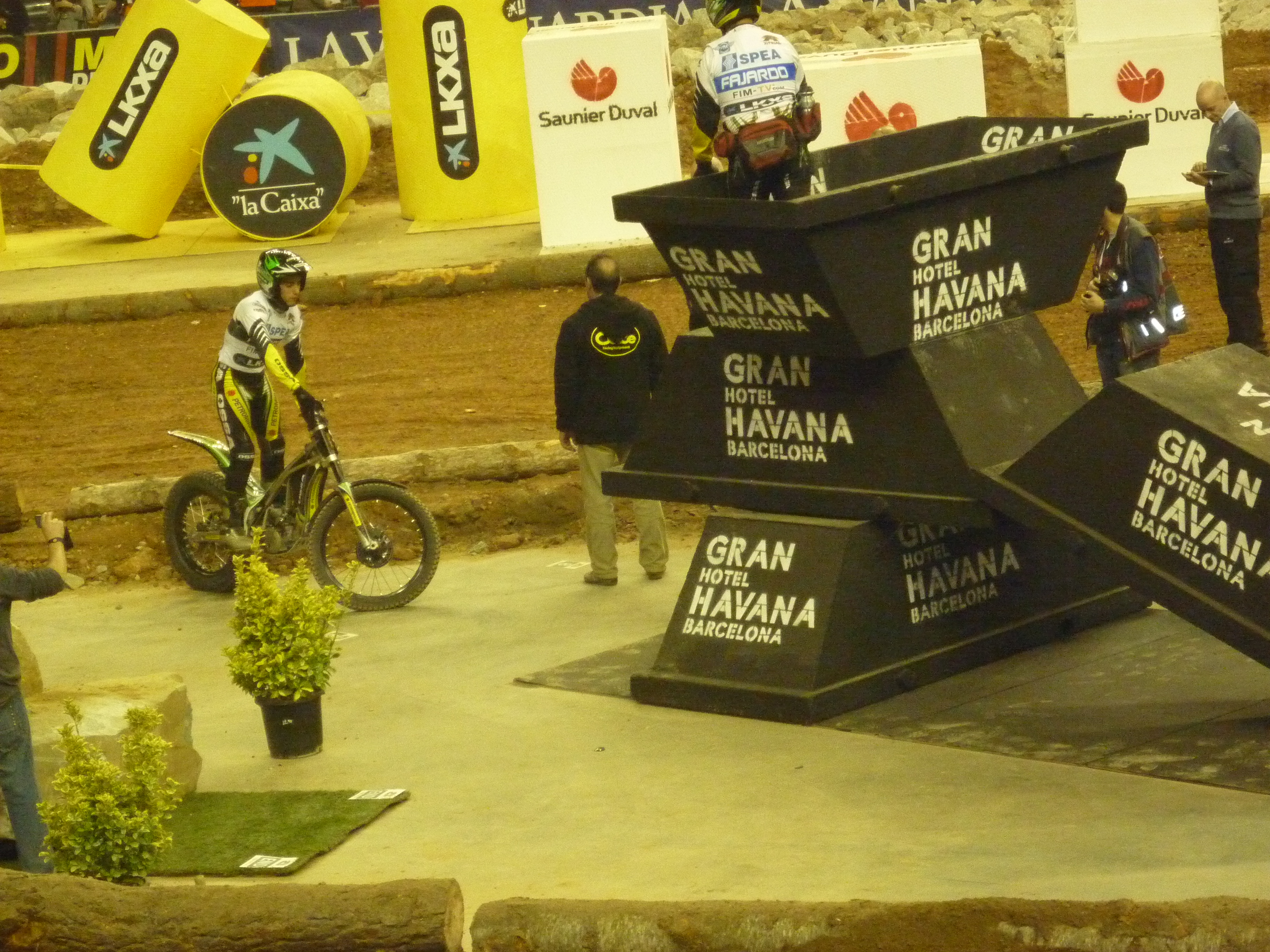
- Indoor Trial, Barcelona 2011
- Nationality: Spanish
- Born: 5 April 1985 (age 41); Caldes De Malavella, Spain
- Current team: Sherco
- Bike number: 4
- Website: https://www.jeronifajardo.com

Jeroni Fajardo (born 5 April 1985) is a Spanish International motorcycle trials rider. Fajardo was the 2002 FIM European Trials champion and member of the winning Spanish TDN team in 2004 and 2006 through 2015.

== Biography ==
Fajardo made his international debut in the FIM European Championship in 2002, winning the title after victories in Italy, Norway and Poland. He also made his FIM Trial World Championship debut the same year, and by 2004, he was included in the Spanish TDN winning team, the world's top Trial De Nations team alongside Albert Cabestany, Max Freixa and Adam Raga. In the Spanish Championships, Fajardo started making a name for himself, winning round 6 held in Vellameca, his first national win.

In 2008, Fajardo finished fourth in the world championships, a feat repeated in 2009 along with Fajardo's first World win in Andorra. He also finished in runner-up spot in the 2009 Spanish Trials Championship behind Toni Bou.

Fajardo made in onto the end of season podium in 2012, finishing third in the World Championship behind Champion Toni Bou and runner-up Adam Raga. 2013 was a repeat finish of 2012 with the top three places identical as the Spaniards took control of the championship.

In 2014, Fajardo slipped back to fourth place overall, and was once again runner-up to Bou in the Spanish Championship.

2015 saw the World Championship results return to normal with a Spanish 1-2-3 of Bou, Raga and Fajardo. This was also how the Spanish Championship ended. From 2006 to 2015, Fajardo has been a member of the Spanish TDN Team alongside Bou and Raga. They remain undefeated for the past 10 years.

For the 2016 season, Fajardo moved away from the Beta camp and signed with the Vertigo team.

== International Trials Championship Career ==
Year	Class	Machine	Rd 1	Rd 2	Rd 3	Rd 4	Rd 5	Rd 6	Rd 7	Rd 8	Rd 9	Rd 10	Rd 11	Rd 12	Rd 13	Rd 14	Rd 15	Rd 16	Rd 17	Rd 18	Points	Pos	Notes
2005	FIM World Championship	Gas Gas	POR -	SPA; 9	JAP; 12	JAP -	USA -	USA -	AND; 7	FRA; 2	FRA; 3	ITA; 9	ITA; 2	GBR; 8	GER; 4	GER; 9	BEL; 6				114	9th	
2006	FIM World Championship	Beta	SPA; 5	POR; 5	USA; 4	USA; 3	JAP; 9	JAP; 8	FRA; 6	ITA; 3	POL; 6	GBR; 7	AND; 5	BEL; 5							131	6th	
2007	FIM World Championship	Beta	SPA; 7	GUA; 7	GUA; 8	FRA; 6	JAP; 5	JAP; 5	ITA; 8	POL; 8	CZE; 5	GBR; 7	AND; 6								104	6th	
2008	FIM World Championship	Beta	IRL; 6	IRL; 5	USA; 6	USA; 4	JAP; 5	JAP; 5	FRA; 5	ITA; 5	CZE; 5	SWE; 5	POR; 2	SPA; 3							142	4th	
2009	FIM World Championship	Beta	IRL; 5	IRL; 4	POR; 4	GBR; 7	GBR; 7	JAP; 6	JAP; 5	ITA; 6	AND; 1	SPA; 3	FRA; 3								136	4th	
2010	FIM World Championship	Beta	SPA; 3	POR; 7	POR; 6	JAP; 2	JAP; 3	GBR; 5	GBR; 8	FRA; 3	RSM; 4	ITA; 4	CZE; 2								143	4th	
2011	FIM World Championship	Ossa	GER; 5	FRA; 2	FRA; 5	SPA; 5	AND; 6	ITA; 4	GBR; 7	JAP; 4	JAP; 9	FRA; 4	FRA -								115	5th	
2012	FIM World Championship	Beta	FRA; 4	FRA; 2	AUS; 5	AUS; 2	JAP; 2	JAP; 4	SPA; 4	SPA; 3	AND; 2	AND; 2	ITA; 6	GBR; 4	GBR; 4						186	3rd	
2013	FIM World Championship	Beta	JAP; 5	JAP; 2	AUS; 3	AUS; 4	AND; 4	AND; 6	SPA; 6	ITA; 4	SPA; 5	GBR; 4	GBR; 3	FRA; 2	FRA; 4						171	3rd	
2014	FIM World Championship	Beta	AUS; 3	AUS; 3	JAP; 5	JAP; 5	EUR -	EUR; 9	ITA; 4	BEL; 5	GBR; 4	GBR; 3	FRA; 3	SPA; 4	SPA; 3						154	4th	
2015	FIM World Championship	Beta	JAP; 2	JAP; 3	CZE; 7	CZE; 3	SWE; 2	SWE; 4	GBR; 4	GBR; 3	FRA; 5	FRA; 3	AND; 3	AND; 4	USA; 5	USA; 3	POR; 3	POR; 5	SPA; 5	SPA; 3	246	3rd	
2016	FIM World Championship	Vertigo	SPA; 5	SPA; 6	JAP; 7	JAP; 5	GER; 5	GER; 6	AND; 6	AND; 3	FRA; 6	FRA; 6	BEL; 4	GBR; 6	GBR; 4	ITA; 3	ITA; 3				173	5th	
2017	FIM World Championship	Vertigo	SPA; 4	JAP; 4	JAP; 4	AND; 6	FRA; 5	GBR; 5	USA; 7	USA; 3	CZE; 4	ITA; 5									119	4th	
2018	FIM World Championship	Gas Gas	SPA; 3	JAP; 1	JAP; 4	AND; 3	POR; 2	FRA; 2	BEL; 6	GBR; 6	ITA; 3										132	2nd	

== Honors ==
- European Trials Champion 2002
- TDN Winning Team Member 2004, 2006, 2007, 2008, 2009, 2010, 2011, 2012, 2013, 2014, 2015, 2018, 2019

== Related Reading ==
- FIM Trial European Championship
- FIM Trial World Championship
