= Emma Bristow =

British motorcycle racer

Emma Bristow MBE
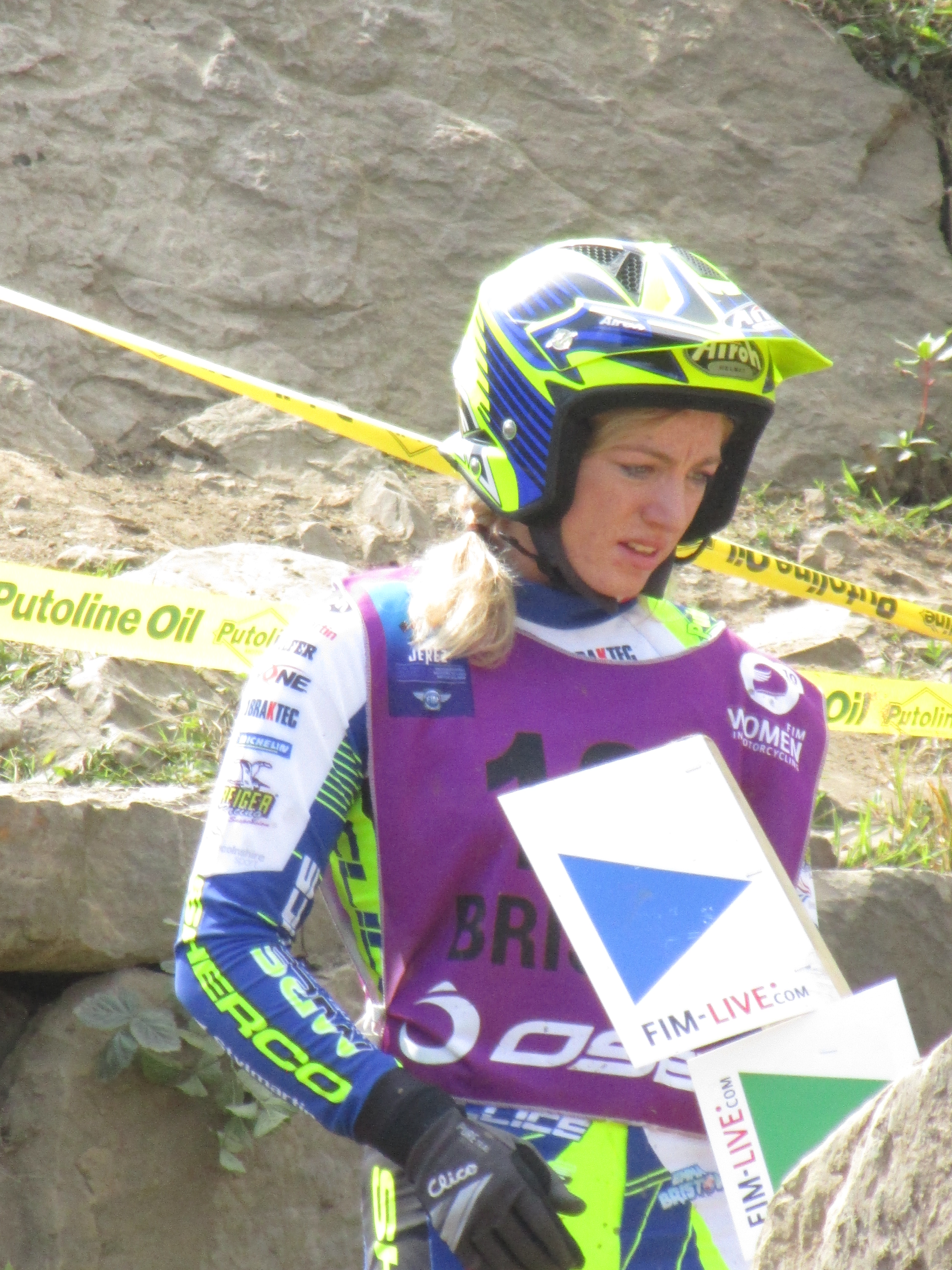
- Born: 29 October 1990 (age 35); Boston, Lincolnshire, United Kingdom
- Nationality: (United Kingdom) British
- Current team: Sherco Factory Racing
- Website: Emma Bristow official site

Championship titles
- 5x British Women's Trials Champion; 5x British Women's Indoor Trials Champion; 2x European Women's Trials Champion; 8x FIM World Women's Trials Champion

Awards
- 2022 Torrens Trophy Award; 2023 MHT Trophy; Order of the British Empire

Emma Elizabeth Fry MBE (née Bristow; born 29 October 1990) is a British professional motorcycle trials rider and nine-times Women’s World Championship rider in World Trials. In 2014, Bristow became the first British rider to win the Women's FIM Trial World Championship. She also has two FIM SuperEnduro World Championships (2014 and 2015), a two-time European champion in the Women's FIM Trial European Championship in 2013 and 2017 and ten British women's titles.

== Biography ==
Bristow began riding at the age of four and became a four time British Youth Champion.

She started her international career at the 2006 World Championships, riding to 9th place in the Andorra round at the age of 16. Competing on a Gas Gas, Bristow contested the European and World rounds over the next few seasons.

Bristow signed for the Ossa factory in 2011 and rode to runner up position in the World Championships, a result she repeated in 2012. At the end of the season, Bristow left her factory ride at Ossa to join Sherco.

In 2013, Bristow won her first Women's FIM Trial European Championship title. In 2014, she won both the British Women's Title and the Women's FIM Trial World Championship title.. In 2015, she was awarded Lincolnshire's sports personality of the year award and best sports woman. She then won the FIM Trial World Championship every year from 2014 to 2020.

Bristow married fellow rider James Fry on 10 November 2018.

In 2020, she became the first female ever to win the prestigious Torrens Trophy Award and made history when she also become the first person to ride into the Royal Automobile Club on two wheels. In 2022, she won her eighth World Trials Championship.

In 2023, Emma Bristow finished in 40th place due to mechanical difficulties but again won the MHT Trophy for the "best performance by a lady rider".

Bristow was appointed Member of the Order of the British Empire (MBE) in the 2023 Birthday Honours for services to motor sports and women in sport.

== National Trials Championship Career ==
Year	Class	Machine	Rd 1	Rd 2	Rd 3	Rd 4	Rd 5	Rd 6	Rd 7	Points	Pos	Notes
2011	(United Kingdom) British Women's	Ossa	MOO; 2	SCA; 1	LIN; 2	SOU; 2	MAN; 1	YEA; 2	RIC; 1	111	2nd	
2012	(United Kingdom) British Women's	Ossa	LOC; 1	DIR; 2	SCA; 2	WES; 1	MCK; 2	ESW; 2		91	2nd	
2013	(United Kingdom) British Women's	Ossa	COL; 2	CHR; 1	VIC; 2	WAI; 2	AST; 1	POW; 2	TRA; 1	111	2nd	
2014	(United Kingdom) British Women's	Sherco	OTT; 1	SOU; 2	SCA; 1	ART; 1	STE; 1	STE; 1	PID; 1	120	1st	British Women's champion
2014	(United Kingdom) British Expert	Sherco	LAK -	RIC -	TEA; 9	EDI -	STD; 10	WOE; 14	RPM; 13	18	16th	
2015	(United Kingdom) British Women's	Sherco	NBE; 1	LUT -	ZON; 1	ZON; 1	MAN; 1	IOM; 1	IOM; 1	120	1st	British Women's champion
2017	(United Kingdom) British Women's	Sherco	NBE; 1	SOU -	TOR; 1	BEX; 1	NOE; 1	NOE; 1		100	1st	British Women's champion

== International Trials Championship Career ==
Year	Class	Machine	Rd 1	Rd 2	Rd 3	Rd 4	Rd 5	Points	Pos	Notes
2006	FIM European Women's	Gas Gas	FRA; 11	ITA; 8	SPA; 7			22	9th	
2006	FIM World Women's	Gas Gas	AND; 9	BEL -	FRA; 13			10	13th	
2007	FIM European Women's	Gas Gas	SPA; 7	ITA; 8	NOR; 10			23	7th	
2007	FIM World Women's	Gas Gas	CZE; 10	BEL -	GBR -			6	14th	
2008	FIM European Women's	Gas Gas	FRA; 6	ITA; 6	CZE; 8			20	6th	
2008	FIM World Women's	Gas Gas	LUX; 6	SPA; 10	AND; 6			20	6th	
2009	FIM World Women's	Gas Gas	AND; 7	FRA; 5	ITA; 12			20	6th	
2010	FIM World Women's	Gas Gas	FRA; 3	CZE; 5	POL; 7			26	4th	
2011	FIM European Women's	Ossa	ITA; 2	GER; 3	CZE; 2			49	2nd	
2011	FIM World Women's	Ossa	GER; 2	CZE; 2	ITA; 4			34	2nd	
2012	FIM European Women's	Ossa	ITA; 3	CZE; 2	NED; 2			49	2nd	
2012	FIM World Women's	Ossa	AND; 2	AND; 4	SUI; 2	SUI; 2	SUI; 4	51	2nd	
2013	FIM European Women's	Ossa	CZE; 1	NOR; 1	SWE; 1			300	1st	FIM European Women's champion
2013	FIM World Women's	Sherco	AND; 3	AND; 1	FRA; 2	FRA; 2	FRA; 2	54	2nd	
2014	FIM World Women's	Sherco	BEL; 1	SPA; 1	SPA; 2	AND; 1		60	1st	FIM World Women's champion
2015	FIM World Women's	Sherco	CZE; 2	CZE; 1	SPA; 1	SPA; 1	SPA; 1	60	1st	FIM World Women's champion
2016	FIM World Women's	Sherco	GBR; 1	GBR; 1	ITA; 1	ITA; 1	FRA; 1	80	1st	FIM World Women's champion
2017	FIM European Women's	Sherco	NED; 1	LET; 1	LET; 2	ITA; 1		385	1st	FIM European Women's champion
2017	FIM World Women's	Sherco	USA; 1	USA; 1	CZE; 1	ITA; 2		77	1st	FIM World Women's champion
2018	FIM World Women's	Sherco	JAP; 1	JAP; 1	FRA; 1	GBR; 1		80	1st	FIM World Women's champion
2019	FIM World Women's	Sherco	JAP; 1	JAP; 1	POR; 1	FRA; 1	SPA; 1	100	1st	FIM World Women's champion

== Honors ==
- British Women's Trials Champion 2014, 2015, 2016, 2017, 2018
- British Women's Indoor Trials Champion 2014, 2015, 2016, 2017, 2018.
- European Women's Trials Champion 2013, 2017
- FIM World Women's Trials Champion 2014, 2015, 2016, 2017, 2018, 2019, 2020, 2022, 2023, 2024.
- Trial des Nations (2009, 2013, 2014, 2015, 2016, 2018, 2023, 2024)

== Related Reading ==
- FIM Trial European Championship
- FIM Trial World Championship
