= Adam Raga =

Spanish motorcycle racer

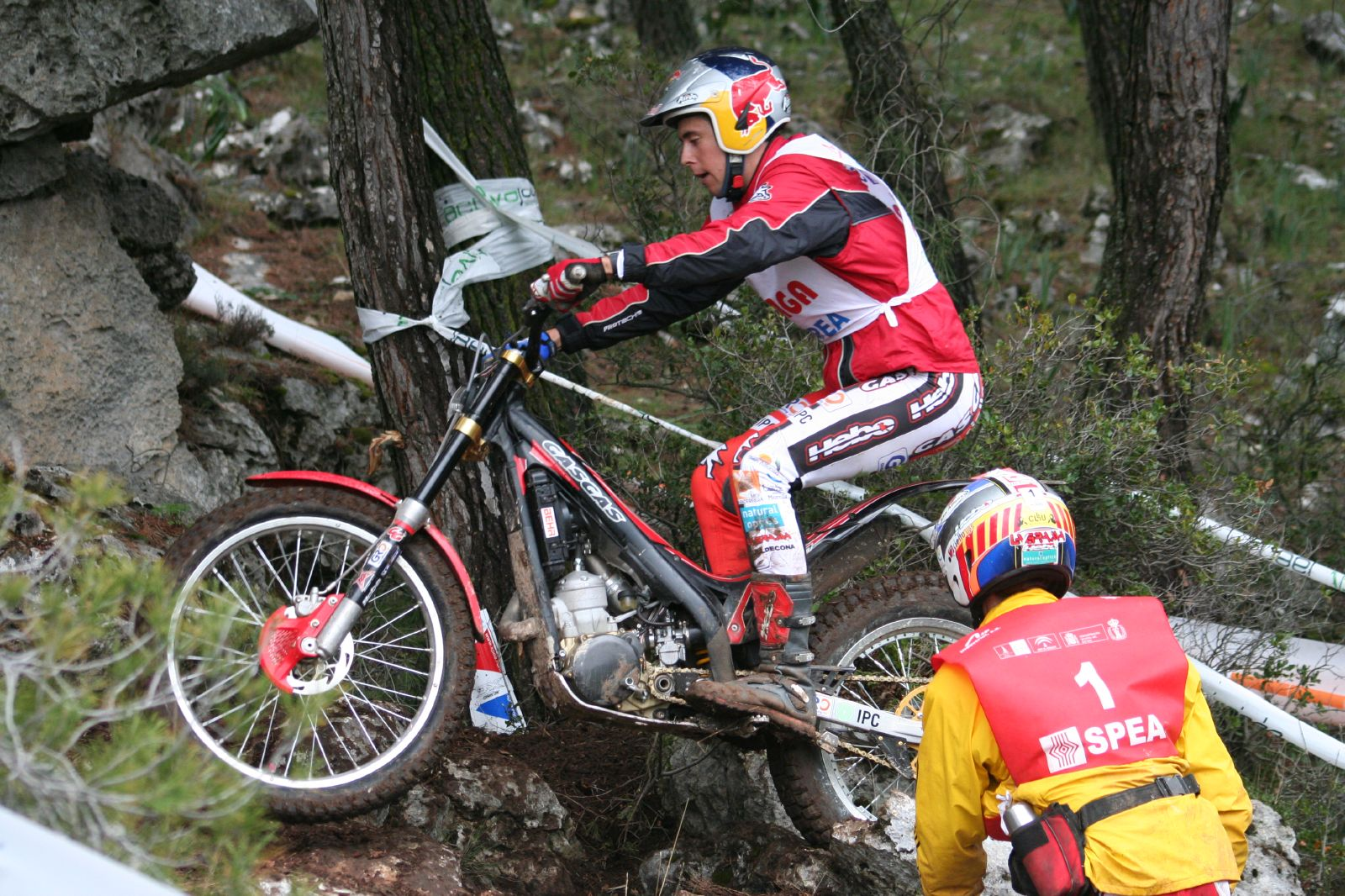
- Adam Raga at the FIM Trial World Championships 2007 opening round.
- Nationality: Spanish
- Born: 6 April 1982 (age 44); Ulldecona, province of Tarragona, Catalonia, Spain
- Current team: TRS Motorcycles UK
- Website: Official website

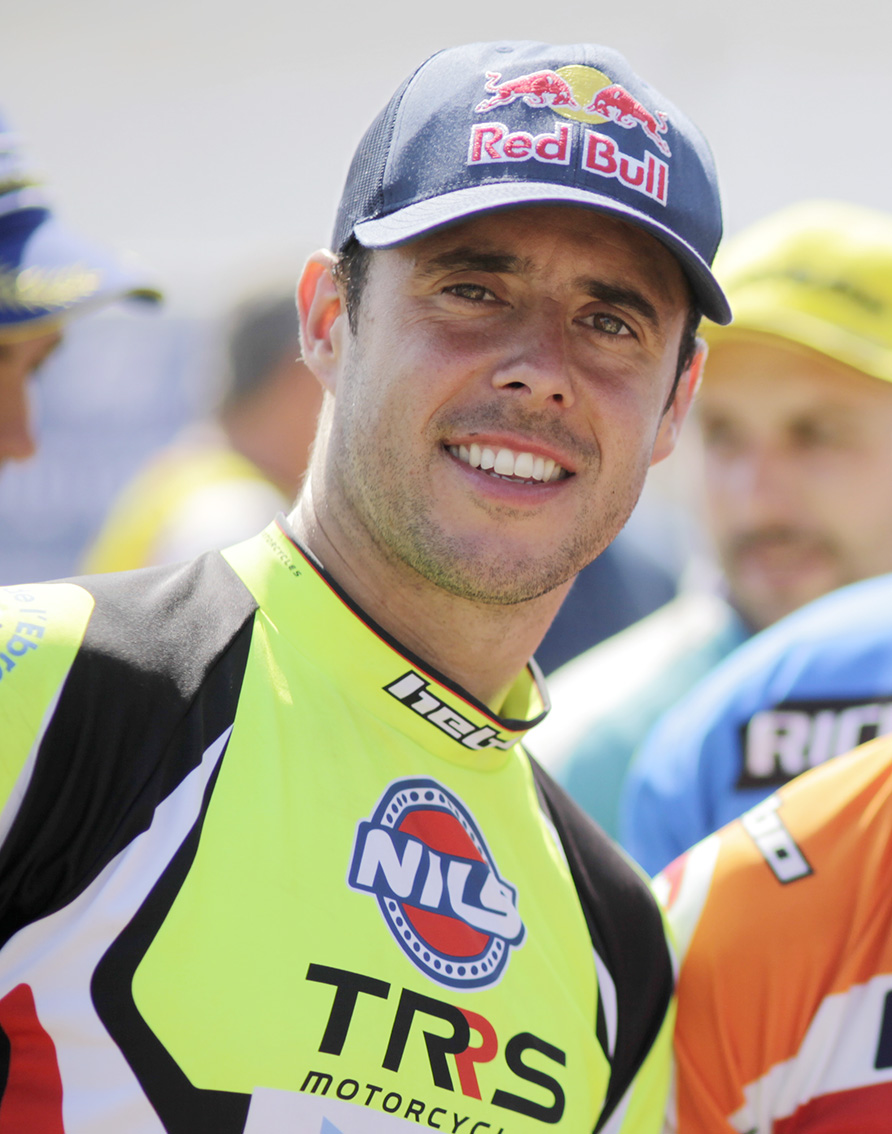
Comblain-au-Pont, Belgium 2018

Adam Raga (born 6 April 1982) in Ulldecona, province of Tarragona, Catalonia, Spain) is a Spanish Motorcycle trials rider.

Raga has won four Indoor World Championships and two Outdoor World Championships.

== Sporting achievements ==
- 1999 – 2nd in the European Championship (280 cc)
- 2000 – Junior world champion (280 cc) and European champion (280 cc)
- 2001 – Nations world champion
- 2003 – Trial Indoor World champion (280 cc) and 4th in the Trial Outdoor World Championship
- 2004 – Trial Indoor World champion (300 cc) and 3rd in the Trial Outdoor World Championship
- 2005 – Trial Indoor World champion (300 cc) and Trial Outdoor World champion
- 2006 – Trial Indoor World champion (300 cc) and Trial Outdoor World Champion
- 2007 – 2nd place in the Trial Indoor World Championship; 2nd place in the Trial Outdoor World Championship.
- 2008 – 2nd place in the Trial Indoor World Championship; 2nd place in the Trial Outdoor World Championship.
- 2009 – 2nd place in the Trial Indoor World Championship; 3rd place in the Trial Outdoor World Championship.
- 2010 – 2nd place in the Trial Indoor World Championship; 3rd place in the Trial Outdoor World Championship.
- 2011 – 2nd place in the Trial Indoor World Championship; 3rd place in the Trial Outdoor World Championship.
- 2012 – 2nd place in the Trial Indoor World Championship; 3rd place in the Trial Outdoor World Championship.
- 2013 – 2nd place in the Trial Indoor World Championship; 2nd place in the Trial Outdoor World Championship.

== Titles ==
- 2 World Motorcycle Trials Champion (2005, 2006)
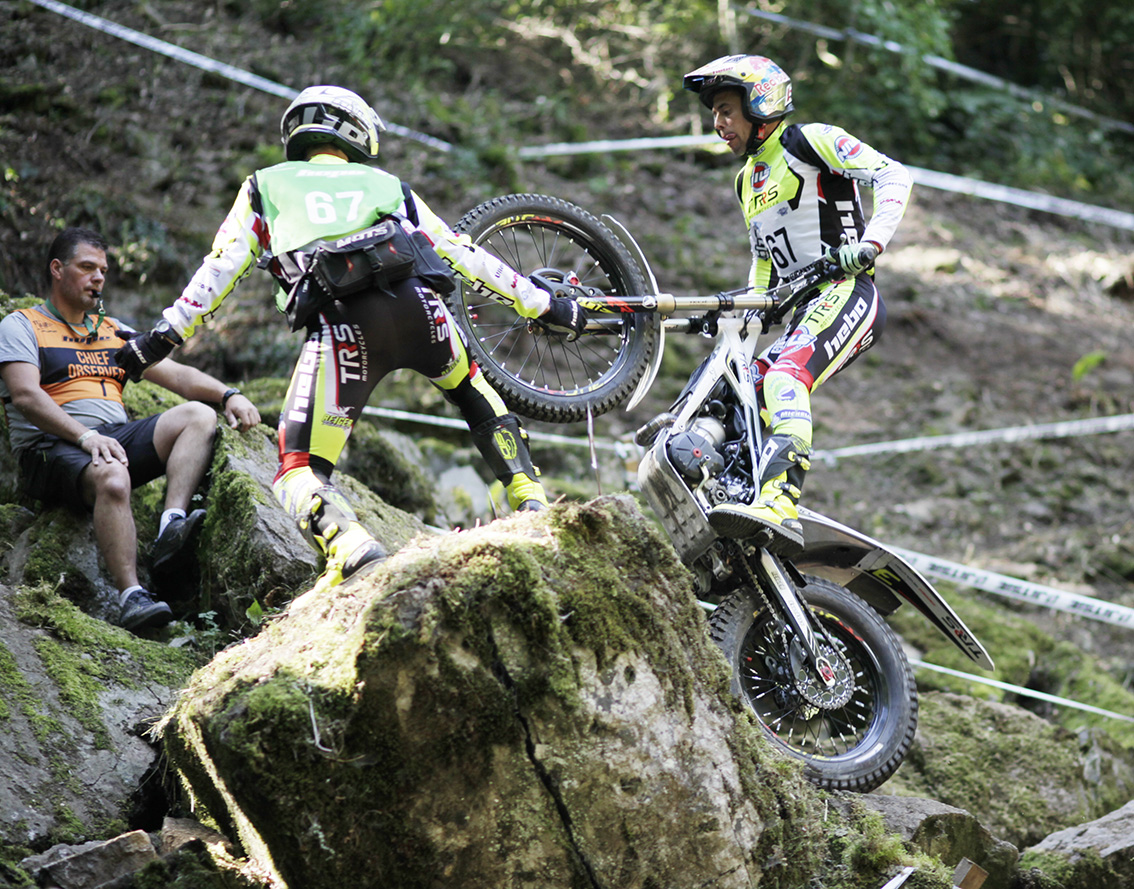
- Comblain-au-Pont, Belgium 2018
  4 World Motorcycle Trials Indoor Champion (2003, 2004, 2005, 2006)
- 6 Spanish Trials Champion (2004, 2005, 2007, 2008, 2010, 2020)
- 4 Spanish Trials Indoor Champion (2003, 2004, 2005, 2007)
- 16 Trial des Nations (2001, 2004, 2005, 2006, 2007, 2008, 2009, 2010, 2011, 2012, 2013, 2014, 2015, 2016, 2017, 2021)

== World Motorcycle Trials results ==
Year	Team	1	2	3	4	5	6	7	8	9	10	11	12	13	14	15	16	17	18	Points	Position
2005	Gas Gas	POR; 2	SPA; 1	JAP; 4	JAP; 4	USA; 4	USA; 4	AND; 1	FRA; 1	FRA; 1	ITA; 1	ITA; 4	GBR; 4	GER; 1	GER; 1	BEL; 1				255	1st
2006	Gas Gas	SPA; 2	POR; 2	USA; 1	USA; 1	JPN; 2	JPN; 2	FRA; 4	ITA; 5	POL; 2	GBR; 2	AND; 3	BEL; 1							201	1st
2007	Gas Gas	SPA; 2	GUA; 3	GUA; 2	FRA; 2	JPN; 2	JPN; 1	ITA; 2	POL; 2	CZE; 1	GBR; 2	AND; 2								191	2nd
2008	Gas Gas	IRL; 2	IRL; 1	USA; 4	USA; 3	JPN; 2	JPN; 2	FRA; 1	ITA; 2	CZE; 1	SWE; 1	POR; 3	ESP; 2							208	2nd
2009	Gas Gas	IRL; 1	IRL; 2	POR; 2	GBR; 2	GBR; 2	JPN; 3	JPN; 3	ITA; 1	AND; 2	ESP; 4	FRA; 1								188	2nd
2010	Gas Gas	ESP; 2	POR; 3	POR; 3	JPN; 3	JPN; 1	GBR; 4	GBR; 4	FRA; 6	RSM; 2	ITA; 2	CZE; 1								172	2nd
2011	Gas Gas	GER; 4	FRA; 1	FRA; 3	ESP; 2	AND; 3	ITA; 2	GBR; 1	JPN; 2	JPN; 1	FRA; 1	FRA; 2								191	2nd
2012	Gas Gas	FRA; 1	FRA; 5	AUS; 2	AUS; 4	JPN; 6	JPN; 5	ESP; 3	ESP; 2	AND; 4	AND; 3	ITA; 4	GBR; 3	GBR; 2						187	2nd
2013	Gas Gas	JPN; 2	JPN; 4	USA; 1	USA; 1	AND; 1	AND; 2	ESP; 2	ITA; 2	CZE; 1	GBR; 3	GBR; 2	FRA; 1	FRA; 3						228	2nd
2014	Gas Gas	AUS; 4	AUS; 2	JPN; 1	JPN; 1	EUR –	EUR; 1	ITA; 2	BEL; 2	GBR; 2	GBR; 2	FRA; 1	ESP; 3	ESP; 2						210	2nd
2015	Gas Gas	JAP; 3	JAP; 4	CZE; 2	CZE; 2	SWE; 4	SWE; 2	GBR; 2	GBR; 2	FRA; 2	FRA; 1	AND; 1	AND; 1	USA; 2	USA; 2	POR; 2	POR; 2	ESP; 1	ESP; 1	311	2nd
2016	T R S	SPA; 3	SPA; 2	JAP; 1	JAP; 2	GER; 2	GER; 2	AND; 2	AND; 2	FRA; 3	FRA; 2	BEL; 2	GBR; 3	GBR; 2	ITA; 2	ITA; 2				252	2nd
2017	T R S	SPA; 2	JAP; 5	JAP; 2	AND; 1	FRA; 2	GBR; 3	USA; 2	USA; 4	CZE; 1	ITA; 2									164	2nd

== World Indoor Trials Championship results ==
Year	Team	1	2	3	4	5	6	7	8	Points	Position
2005	Gas Gas										
2006	Gas Gas										
2007	Gas Gas										
2008	Gas Gas										
2009	Gas Gas										
2010	Gas Gas										
2011	Gas Gas										
2012	Gas Gas										
2013	Gas Gas										
2014	Gas Gas										
2015	Gas Gas										
2016	T R S	GBR; 1	SPA; 2	AUT; 3	FRA; 3						
2017	T R S	SPA; 2	AUT; 2	FRA; 2	FRA; 2						
2018	T R S										
2019	T R S	HUN; 2	SPA; 1								
