= Slammin' Sammy =

The nickname Slammin' Sammy can refer to:

- Sam Snead (1912–2002), American golfer
- Sammy Sosa (born 1968), Dominican Republican baseball player
- Sammy Swindell (born 1955), American race car driver
- Samuel Dalembert (born 1981) Haitian basketball player
- Sammy Miller (1945–2002), American race car driver
