= Scottish Six Days Trial =

Motorcycle competition

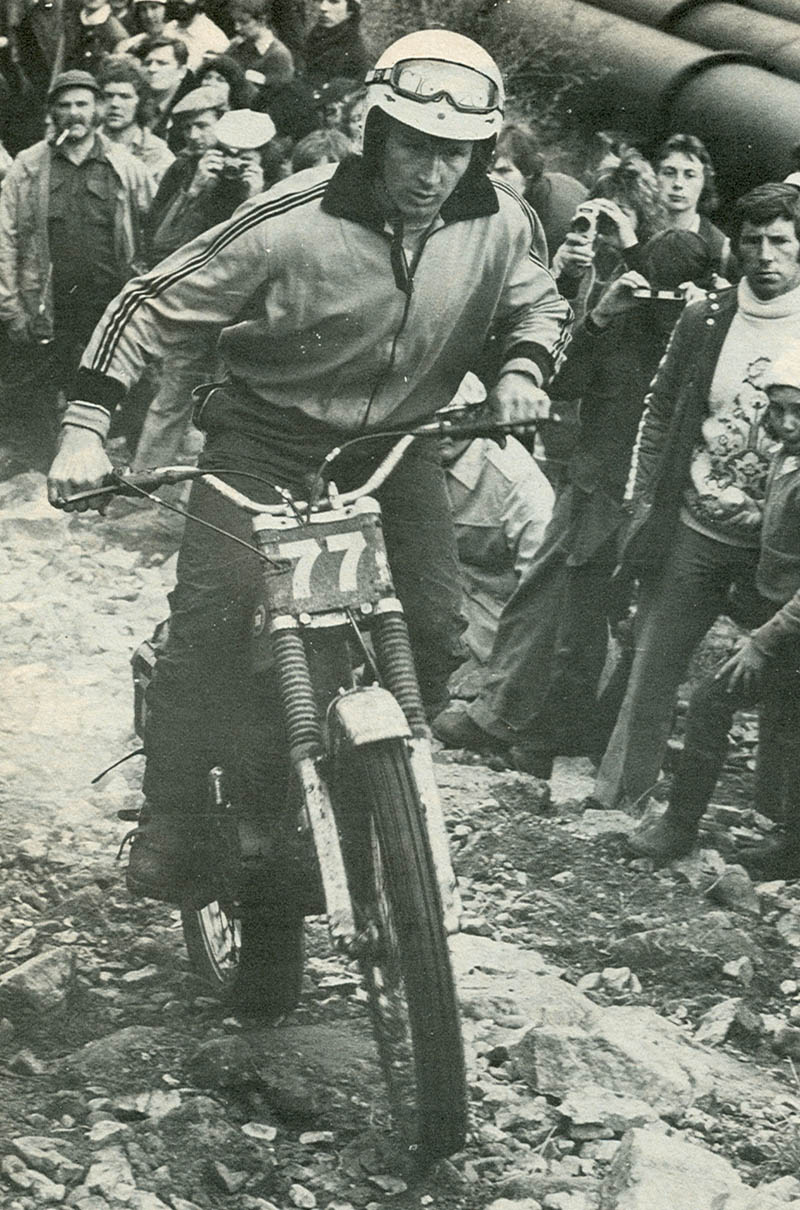
Malcolm Rathmell competing in the Scottish Six Days Trial, 1977

The Scottish Six Days Trial is an internationally recognised Motorcycle trials competition, which has been running since 1909 (with breaks for the two world wars) making it the oldest motorcycle trials event in the world. Motorcycle riders from all over the world compete in this extreme sport, covering as much as 100 miles a day on road and off-road routes around Lochaber on each of the six days. The event is a trial of the skill, consistency and endurance of the riders, as well as a test of the specialised motorcycles used.

== History ==
The inaugural Scottish motorcycle trial was held in July 1909 and was a five-day event devised by Campbell McGregor of the Edinburgh Motor Cycle Club.

Originally, the trial started in Edinburgh, going to John O'Groats before returning to Edinburgh. It aimed to be the most challenging motorcycle trial ever held. The Edinburgh & District Club organised the event from 1911. Prior to that event the organisers were a combination of local clubs in the Edinburgh area.

By 1912 the event was known as the "Scottish Six Days Open Reliability Trial" and by 1914 rules were agreed together with a marking system and time penalties for machine faults. The outbreak of the First World War halted competition but the Six Days Trial returned in 1919. Problems with following the route were solved by marking the course with yellow ochre from a barrel mounted on a car (a system which stayed in place until the mid-1970s, when the present system of marker arrows and orange flags for off-road sections was introduced). The scoring system was updated in 1926 to allow for condition, hillclimbing and brake testing but the event was still a test of motorcycle reliability.

From the 1930s factory teams became more prevalent and in 1932 the results system was further amended to identify an outright winner. In 1938, Fort William was chosen as the central point of the trial although, it still started and ended in Edinburgh. The outbreak of World War II stopped competition until 1947, when 108 competitors took part.

In 1977, the event broke its link with Edinburgh and the event started and finished in Fort William. This was due to the Gathering of the Clans taking up a sizeable amount of accommodation in the Capital. The organisers were forced to move the start and finish to Fort William, but it proved very popular move, as it assisted the logistics of the trial for both competitors and officials. During the 1970s and 1980s, the Scottish Six Days Trial grew in popularity and was established as the most important event for trials motorcycles.

== The club ==
The Edinburgh & District Motor Club Ltd is based in Edinburgh and was formed through the amalgamation of several Edinburgh based motor clubs in 1911. The headquarters of the Edinburgh & District Motor Club Ltd and hence the SSDT was at 28 Nelson Street, Edinburgh until 2001 when the premises were sold for redevelopment. It is the recognised organisation responsible body for the Scottish Six Days Trial. The club decided to celebrate 100 years of the event in 2011, this resulted in a massive over-subscription of the trial. Since the 1940s the event has been known as "A Sporting Holiday in The Highlands" but in reality it is a truly competitive event.

== The 1950s and 1960s ==
Over the years particular makes of machine appear to have dominated the trial. One such make was the AJS. Manufactured by Associated Motor Cycles (AMC) in Plumstead, South East London, England, the rugged and reliable AJS Model 16 was considered ideal for the demands of the Scottish Trial, with modifications including upgrading the frame to a welded duplex tubular frame with an engine cradle to reduce weight and redesigned exhaust and footrests to improve ground clearance. In 1957 it was further redesigned to increase clearance from 7 inches to 10 inches. Hugh Viney led the AJS works team in the post war years and won the challenging 1947 Trial on an AJS 16MC at his first attempt – then repeated the achievement the following year and made it three in a row in 1949. In the 1950s this record was beaten by another AJS Works Team rider Gordon Jackson, who won the Scottish four times, in the 1961 event he won the trial losing only one mark. The SSDT, up until 1976, started on the Monday morning from the Gorgie Cattle Market (Now called 'The Corn Exchange') and finished on the Saturday at the Observatory at Blackford Hill, Edinburgh. The event being based at Fort William during the week.

== Present day ==
The "Scottish" has been completely based at Fort William since the 1977 event and is so popular that there are usually over 500 entries for the 275 places available. Of the 275 places, 30 are reserved for factory teams and a further 50 for allocation by the club. The remaining places are allocated through a ballot system. Following a period of private refuelling services and the increase in health and safety regulations, the British Army were invited and made use of the SSDT as a live refuelling exercise called 'Operation Highland Trot'. The future of the SSDT was put into temporary jeopardy in 2003 when the Army reluctantly announced in late 2002 that they were no longer able to provide a refuelling service. However, the SSDT was able to continue through 2003 with another branch of the Army taking over the refuelling services. Since the 1960s it has been customary for a Scotsman to be allocated the riding number 1. The trial celebrated its 'Official Centenary' in 2011, 100 years since the 1911 event, which was the first organised by the Edinburgh & District Motor Club Ltd. The majority of the event takes place on private ground, connected by public highway. Following the event by motorcycle on private land is strictly prohibited, as permission for the competitors and officials is only granted under this caveat. Spectators at observed sections are welcome, but those spectating are asked to park sensibly at or near sections. Observing these requirements will thus ensure the future of this prestigious event. The trial organisers work very closely with landowners and government agencies to ensure that the environment is protected during not only the event itself, but the preparations prior to it on an annual basis.

== SSDT winners ==
(No outright winners were identifiable prior to 1932)

Year	Name	Notes
1932	Bob MacGregor	499cc Rudge (First Scot to win the SSDT)
1933	Len Heath	497cc Ariel
1934	Jack Williams	348cc Norton
1935	Bob MacGregor	Rudge (Last win by a Scotsman)
1936	Billy Tiffen	343cc Velocette
1937	Jack Williams	348cc Norton
1938	Fred Povey	348cc Ariel
1939	Allan Jeffries	Triumph
1947	Hugh Viney	AJS Model 16
1948	Hugh Viney	AJS
1949	Hugh Viney	AJS (First SSDT "Hat trick")
1950	Artie Ratcliffe	350cc Matchless
1951	John Draper	350cc BSA
1952	Johnny Brittain	Royal Enfield
1953	Hugh Viney	AJS
1954	Artie Ratcliffe	Matchless (OLH 721)
1955	Jeff Smith	500cc BSA Gold Star
1956	Gordon Jackson	AJS
1957	Johnny Brittain	350cc Royal Enfield Bullet – HNP 331
1958	Gordon Jackson	350cc AJS
1959	Roy Peplow	199cc Triumph Tiger Cub (First time a small capacity motorcycle won)
1960	Gordon Jackson	350cc AJS
1961	Gordon Jackson	350cc AJS (187 BLF – Won on 1 mark lost)
1962	Sammy Miller	500cc Ariel – GOV 132
1963	Arthur Lampkin	Factory 250cc BSA
1964	Sammy Miller	500cc Ariel GOV 132
1965	Sammy Miller	Bultaco two-stroke (669 NHO)
1966	Alan Lampkin	250cc BSA (last four-stroke win until 2007)
1967	Sammy Miller	Bultaco
1968	Sammy Miller	Bultaco
1969	Bill Wilkinson	250cc Greeves Anglian (WWC 169F)
1970	Mick Andrews	Ossa
1971	Mick Andrews	Ossa
1972	Mick Andrews	Ossa
1973	Malcolm Rathmell	250cc Bultaco (XWW 34L)
1974	Mick Andrews	Yamaha OW10 Yamaha
1975	Mick Andrews	Yamaha
1976	Martin Lampkin	Bultaco
1977	Martin Lampkin	Bultaco
1978	Martin Lampkin	Bultaco
1979	Malcolm Rathmell	Montesa 310 Cota
1980	Yrjö Vesterinen	Montesa (First win by an overseas rider)
1981	Gilles Burgat	280cc SWM
1982	Bernie Schreiber	280cc SWM
1983	Tony Gorgot	Montesa
1984	Thierry Michaud	Fantic
1985	Thierry Michaud	Fantic
1986	Thierry Michaud	Fantic
1987	Jordi Tarres	Beta
1988	Steve Saunders	Fantic
1989	Steve Saunders	Fantic
1990	Steve Saunders	Beta
1991	Steve Saunders	260cc Beta
1992	Steve Colley	260cc Beta
1993	Steve Colley	260cc Beta
1994	Dougie Lampkin	250cc Beta
1995	Dougie Lampkin	250cc Beta
1996	Dougie Lampkin	250cc Beta
1997	Steve Colley	270cc Gas Gas
1998	Graham Jarvis	250cc Scorpa
1999	Graham Jarvis	250cc Bultaco Sherco
2000	Steve Colley	280cc Gas Gas
2001	No SSDT	Due to Foot and Mouth Disease, the Scottish Six Days Trial was suspended
2002	Amós Bilbao	249cc Montesa
2003	Joan Pons	290cc Sherco
2004	Graham Jarvis	290cc Sherco
2005	Sam Connor	290cc Sherco
2006	Graham Jarvis	290cc Sherco
2007	James Dabill	300cc Future TRW Montesa (First four-stroke win since Alan Lampkin in 1966)
2008	Dougie Lampkin	270cc Beta
2009	Dougie Lampkin	290cc Beta
2010	Alexz Wigg	290cc Beta
2011	James Dabill	290cc Beta
2012	Dougie Lampkin	Gas Gas
2013	Dougie Lampkin	Gas Gas
2014	Dougie Lampkin	DL12 – Gas Gas
2015	Dougie Lampkin	Vertigo
2016	Dougie Lampkin	Vertigo
2017	Dougie Lampkin	Vertigo
2018	Dougie Lampkin	Vertigo
2019	James Dabill	Beta
2020	No SSDT	Due to COVID-19 pandemic, the Scottish Six Days Trial was cancelled
2021	No SSDT	Due to COVID-19 pandemic, the Scottish Six Days Trial was cancelled
2022	Dougie Lampkin	Vertigo
2023	Dougie Lampkin	Vertigo
2024	Jack Price	Sherco
2025	Jack Peace	Sherco

== See also ==
- Scott Trial
- FIM Trial World Championship
