= Johnny Brittain =

English motorcycle racer (1931–2019)

- Born: 1932; UK
- Died: 7 March 2019 (aged 86–87)
- Occupation: Motorcycle Trials Rider

John V. Brittain (1932 − 7 March 2019) was an English motorcycle trials and enduro rider. His father Vic Brittain was also a famous trials rider and winner of the British Experts Trial in 1936 and 1938.

== Biography ==
Originally riding for DMW and then James motorcycles, Brittain beat the three James works riders in his first International Six Days' Trial (ISDT) in the 125cc class. He moved to Royal Enfield riding the Royal Enfield Bullet 350cc. 1950 was his first full year riding the Bullet, at the very young age of eighteen when he won a gold medal in the ISDT held that year in Wales, as well as the first class gold award in the Scottish Six Days Trial, a nine hundred mile endurance competition.

Overall, Brittain won more than 50 trade sponsored championship events. These wins included the tough Scott and British Experts trials, which he won twice. In 1956 he won the ACU star and was runner up or third place in several other competitions. Johnny competed in the International Six Days Trials for fifteen consecutive years, winning 13 gold medals. He was a member of the last British team to win the event in Czechoslovakia in 1953.

He also followed his father Vic's success at the British Experts Trial, winning after completing two 30 mile laps of the course in Stroud, Gloucestershire in blizzard conditions.

John Brittain died in March 2019.
