= 1961 Motocross World Championship =

Motocross championship season

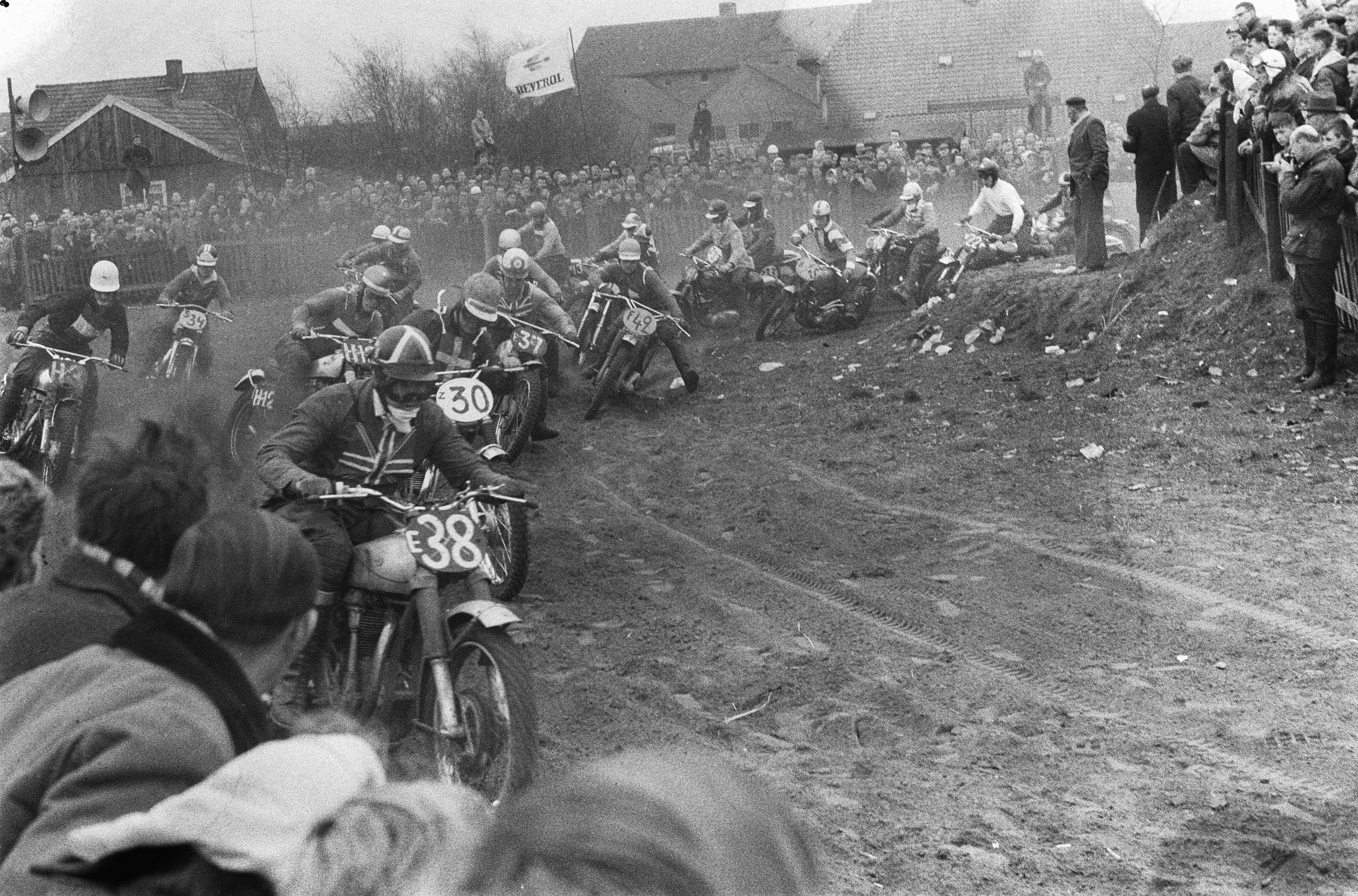
- Start of the Motocross der Azen pre-season invitational race on 12 March 1961 in Sint Anthonis, Holland.
- Organizer: FIM
- Duration: 8 April/3 September
- Number of races: 11
- Number of manufacturers: 15

Champions
- 500cc: (Sweden) Sten Lundin
- 250cc (Note: Now called the European Championship.): (United Kingdom) Dave Bickers

Motocross World Championship
- ← 1960 1962 →

The 1961 Motocross World Championship was the 5th edition of the Motocross World Championship organized by the FIM and reserved for 500cc and 250cc motorcycles.

== Summary ==
Sten Lundin, riding a Monark motorcycle rebadged as a Lito, took an early championship lead by winning the first three Grand Prix races of the year, then held off a challenge from Husqvarna's Bill Nilsson to claim his second 500cc Motocross World Championship. Dave Curtis swept both races of the 500cc British Grand Prix, while Broer Dirkx repeated his 1959 success in the 500cc Dutch Grand Prix.

Dave Bickers, riding for the Greeves factory racing team claimed his second consecutive 250cc European Motocross Championship over his countrymen, BSA teammates Arthur Lampkin and Jeff Smith. Bickers dominated the season, winning 6 out of 13 Grand Prix races and setting a season record with 14 individual race victories. Lampkin actually scored more points overall than Bickers, but fell victim to FIM scoring rules, which only recognize the top seven of thirteen results. The rules would be changed in 1977. Future four-time 250cc world champion Torsten Hallman won the first world championship race of his career at the 1961 250cc Finnish Grand Prix.

Future three-time World Champion Paul Friedrichs makes his first World Championship appearance at the 250cc East German Grand Prix. Due to the Berlin Crisis of 1961 at the height of the Cold War, few western European riders attend the season ending East German Grand Prix in Apolda.

== Grands Prix ==
=== 500cc ===
Round	Date	Grand Prix	Location	Race 1 Winner	Race 2 Winner	Overall Winner	Report
1	April 9	(Switzerland) Swiss Grand Prix	Payerne	(Sweden) Sten Lundin	(Sweden) Bill Nilsson	(Sweden) Sten Lundin	Report
2	April 30	(Austria) Austrian Grand Prix	Sittendorf	(Sweden) Sten Lundin	(Sweden) Sten Lundin	(Sweden) Sten Lundin	Report
3	May 28	(France) French Grand Prix	Jonzac	(Sweden) Sten Lundin	(Sweden) Sten Lundin	(Sweden) Sten Lundin	Report
4	June 4	(Czech Republic) Czechoslovak Grand Prix	Přerov	(Sweden) Bill Nilsson	(Sweden) Bill Nilsson	(Sweden) Bill Nilsson	Report
5	June 11	(Italy) Italian Grand Prix	Imola	(Sweden) Bill Nilsson	(Sweden) Bill Nilsson	(Sweden) Bill Nilsson	Report
6	July 2	(United Kingdom) British Grand Prix	Hawkstone Park	(United Kingdom) Dave Curtis	(United Kingdom) Dave Curtis	(United Kingdom) Dave Curtis	Report
7	July 24	(Netherlands) Dutch Grand Prix	Dreumel	(Netherlands) Broer Dirkx	(Sweden) Bill Nilsson	(Netherlands) Broer Dirkx	Report
8	August 5	(Belgium) Belgian Grand Prix*	Namur	-	-	(Sweden) Sten Lundin	Report
9	August 13	Luxembourg Grand Prix	Ettelbruck	(Sweden) Sten Lundin	(Sweden) Sten Lundin	(Sweden) Sten Lundin	Report
10	August 20	(Sweden) Swedish Grand Prix	Uddevalla	(Sweden) Bill Nilsson	(Sweden) Bill Nilsson	(Sweden) Bill Nilsson	Report
11	September 3	(Germany) West German Grand Prix	Immenstadt	(Sweden) Bill Nilsson	(Sweden) Sten Lundin	(Sweden) Sten Lundin	Report
*Organizers of the Belgian Grand Prix hold qualifying heat races for a single final round. Sources:

=== 250cc ===
Round	Date	Grand Prix	Location	Race 1 Winner	Race 2 Winner	Overall Winner	Report
1	April 23	(Belgium) Belgian Grand Prix	Aywaille	(United Kingdom) Dave Bickers	(United Kingdom) Dave Bickers	(United Kingdom) Dave Bickers	Report
2	May 7	(France) French Grand Prix	Thomer-la-Sôgne	(United Kingdom) Dave Bickers	(United Kingdom) Dave Bickers	(United Kingdom) Dave Bickers	Report
3	May 11	(Netherlands) Dutch Grand Prix	Markelo	(United Kingdom) Jeff Smith	(United Kingdom) Jeff Smith	(United Kingdom) Jeff Smith	Report
4	May 21	(Czech Republic) Czechoslovak Grand Prix	Divoká Šárka	(United Kingdom) Dave Bickers	(United Kingdom) Jeff Smith	(United Kingdom) Jeff Smith	Report
5	May 28	(Poland) Polish Grand Prix	Katowice-Zabrze	(United Kingdom) Dave Bickers	(United Kingdom) Dave Bickers	(United Kingdom) Dave Bickers	Report
6	June 4	Luxembourg Grand Prix	Schifflange	(United Kingdom) Jeff Smith	(United Kingdom) Dave Bickers	(United Kingdom) Dave Bickers	Report
7	June 18	(Finland) Finnish Grand Prix	Tikkurila	(United Kingdom) Dave Bickers	(United Kingdom) Arthur Lampkin	(Sweden) Torsten Hallman	Report
8	June 25	(Italy) Italian Grand Prix	Settimo	(United Kingdom) Jeff Smith	(Italy) Lanfranco Angelini	(United Kingdom) Arthur Lampkin	Report
9	July 2	(Germany) West German Grand Prix	Ühlingen	(United Kingdom) Arthur Lampkin	(Sweden) Torsten Hallman	(United Kingdom) Arthur Lampkin	Report
10	July 15	(United Kingdom) British Grand Prix	Shrubland Park	(United Kingdom) Dave Bickers	(United Kingdom) Dave Bickers	(United Kingdom) Dave Bickers	Report
11	August 13	(Switzerland) Swiss Grand Prix	Wohlen	(United Kingdom) Arthur Lampkin	(United Kingdom) Dave Bickers	(United Kingdom) Arthur Lampkin	Report
12	September 3	(Sweden) Swedish Grand Prix	Knutstorp	(United Kingdom) Dave Bickers	(United Kingdom) Dave Bickers	(United Kingdom) Dave Bickers	Report
13	September 10	(East Germany) East German Grand Prix	Apolda	(Czech Republic) Jaromír Čížek	(Czech Republic) Jaromír Čížek	(Czech Republic) Jaromír Čížek	Report

== Final standings ==
Points are awarded to the top 6 classified finishers. For the final championship standings, half of the competitors' results + 1 are retained. Thus with 11 500cc Grands Prix, the 6 best results are retained. With 13 250cc Grands Prix, the 7 best results are retained.

Position	1st	2nd	3rd	4th	5th	6th
Points	8	6	4	3	2	1

=== 500cc ===
(Results in italics indicate overall winner)

Pos	Rider	Machine	CH (Switzerland)		AUT (Austria)		FRA (France)		TCH (Czech Republic)		ITA (Italy)		UK (United Kingdom)		NED (Netherlands)		BEL (Belgium)	LUX (Luxembourg)		SWE (Sweden)		GER (West Germany)		Pts
Pos	Rider	Machine	R1	R2	R1	R2	R1	R2	R1	R2	R1	R2	R1	R2	R1	R2	R1*	R1	R2	R1	R2	R1	R2	Pts
1	(Sweden) Sten Lundin	Lito	1	2	1	1	1	1	4	3	2	2	-	-	2	3	1	1	1	3	2	2	1	48
2	(Sweden) Bill Nilsson	Husqvarna	2	1	3	-	2	-	1	1	1	1	-	-	5	1	-	-	-	1	1	1	10	36
3	(Sweden) Gunnar Johansson	Lito	3	4	4	5	21	-	-	-	3	3	4	2	4	11	2	4	-	2	3	5	7	25
4	(Czech Republic) Miloslav Soucek	ESO	5	6	5	3	-	-	2	2	9	9	-	-	18	15	12	5	3	-	-	10	13	19
5	(Sweden) Rolf Tibblin	Husqvarna	-	-	-	-	-	-	5	4	5	4	-	6	-	-	-	2	10	6	7	3	2	15
6	(United Kingdom) John Burton	BSA	-	-	2	2	-	-	-	-	7	-	6	4	8	-	10	7	2	8	5	-	-	13
7	(Netherlands) Broer Dirk	BSA	-	-	-	-	-	-	-	-	-	-	5	-	1	2	-	-	-	-	-	4	5	12
8	(United Kingdom) David Curtis	Matchless	-	-	-	-	-	-	-	-	-	-	1	1	-	-	-	-	-	-	-	-	-	8
9	(Sweden) Ove Lundell	Monark	-	-	-	-	8	2	6	5	-	-	-	-	-	-	-	-	-	5	-	-	-	7
10	(Czech Republic) Ervín Krajčovič	ESO	4	12	6	4	-	-	3	6	-	-	-	-	-	-	5	-	-	-	-	7	8	7
11	(Sweden) Lars Gustavsson	Lito	-	-	-	-	4	-	-	-	-	-	2	3	-	-	-	-	-	-	-	-	-	6
12	(United Kingdom) Jeff Smith	BSA	-	-	-	-	-	-	-	-	4	5	-	-	3	-	3	-	-	-	-	-	-	6
13	(Belgium) Herman De Soete	Matchless	-	-	-	-	10	3	-	-	6	7	8	12	-	-	4	3	-	-	-	-	-	6
14	(United Kingdom) Derek Rickman	Triumph-Métisse	-	-	-	-	5	5	-	-	-	-	9	15	-	-	-	-	-	-	-	-	-	4
15	(France) Guy Bertrand	BSA	-	-	-	-	7	4	-	-	-	-	-	-	-	-	-	-	-	-	-	-	-	3
16	(Netherlands) Jan Clijnk	BSA	-	-	-	-	12	-	-	-	-	-	-	-	6	4	-	-	-	-	-	-	-	3
17	(Sweden) Per Olaf Persson	Monark	-	-	-	-	-	-	-	-	-	-	-	-	-	-	-	-	-	4	6	-	-	3
18	(United Kingdom) Gordon Blakeway	Triumph	-	-	-	-	-	-	-	-	-	-	-	11	13	-	-	-	-	-	-	6	4	3
19	(Australia) Tim Gibbes	AJS	15	-	-	-	15	-	-	-	-	-	-	-	-	-	-	-	-	-	-	13	11	2
20	(United Kingdom) John Harris	BSA	-	-	-	-	-	-	-	-	-	-	7	7	-	-	-	-	-	-	-	-	-	2
21	(Belgium) Frans Slechten	BSA	-	-	-	-	-	-	-	-	-	-	-	-	7	6	-	-	-	-	-	-	-	2
22	(Belgium) Hubert Scaillet	Triumph	-	-	-	-	-	-	-	-	-	-	-	-	-	-	-	6	9	-	-	-	-	2
23	(Sweden) Roine Lööf	BSA	-	-	-	-	-	-	-	-	-	-	-	-	-	-	-	-	-	7	4	-	-	2
24	(France) Georges Delpeyrat	Triumph	15	9	-	-	6	8	-	-	-	-	12	17	-	-	-	-	-	-	-	-	-	1
25	(Czech Republic) Josef Hrebecek	ESO	-	-	-	6	-	-	-	-	-	-	-	-	19	17	7	-	-	-	-	-	-	1
26	(Switzerland) Florian Thevenaz	Triumph	10	5	-	-	22	17	-	-	-	-	-	-	-	-	-	-	-	-	-	-	-	1
27	(Belgium) Roger Vanderbecken	Triumph	-	-	-	-	-	-	-	-	16	8	11	8	-	-	-	-	-	-	-	-	-	1
28	(Belgium) Jef Teuwissen	BSA	-	-	-	-	-	-	-	-	-	-	-	-	-	-	6	-	-	-	-	12	12	1
29	(Switzerland) Jacques Langel	BSA	-	-	-	-	27	-	-	-	-	-	-	14	-	16	16	10	4	-	-	-	-	1
-	(United Kingdom) Donald Rickman	Triumph-Métisse	-	-	-	-	3	-	-	-	-	-	3	-	-	-	-	-	-	-	-	-	-	0
-	(United Kingdom) Les Archer Jr.	Norton	-	-	-	-	-	-	-	-	-	-	-	5	-	-	-	-	-	-	-	-	3	0
-	(Switzerland) Pierre André Rapin	Monark	-	3	-	-	16	-	-	-	-	-	-	-	-	-	-	-	-	-	-	-	-	0
-	(United Kingdom) Arthur Lampkin	BSA	-	-	-	-	-	-	-	-	10	6	-	-	-	-	-	-	-	-	-	-	-	0
*Organizers of the Belgian Grand Prix hold qualifying heat races for a single final round. Sources:

=== 250cc ===
(Results in italics indicate overall winner)

Pos	Rider	Machine	BEL (Belgium)		FRA (France)		NED (Netherlands)		TCH (Czech Republic)		POL (Poland)		LUX (Luxembourg)		FIN (Finland)		ITA (Italy)		GER (Germany)		UK (United Kingdom)		CH (Switzerland)		SWE (Sweden)		GDR (East Germany)		Pts
Pos	Rider	Machine	R1	R2	R1	R2	R1	R2	R1	R2	R1	R2	R1	R2	R1	R2	R1	R2	R1	R2	R1	R2	R1	R2	R1	R2	R1	R2	Pts
1	(United Kingdom) Dave Bickers	Greeves	1	1	1	1	5	2	1	-	1	1	2	1	1	-	-	-	2	-	1	1	-	1	1	1	-	-	51
2	(United Kingdom) Arthur Lampkin	BSA	2	-	-	-	2	4	4	2	3	2	3	4	5	1	2	2	1	2	2	2	1	2	2	2	-	-	48
3	(United Kingdom) Jeff Smith	BSA	-	-	3	2	1	1	3	1	2	6	1	3	3	4	1	3	4	3	-	-	3	3	11	-	-	-	40
4	(Sweden) Torsten Hallman	Husqvarna	6	4	2	3	3	3	-	4	-	-	4	2	2	3	-	-	5	1	3	4	2	6	3	-	-	-	33
5	(Czech Republic) Jaromír Čížek	Jawa	4	5	6	15	-	-	2	5	-	-	8	5	-	-	-	-	-	-	6	6	-	-	-	5	1	1	19
6	(Finland) Aarno Erola	Husqvarna	-	-	14	11	4	5	-	-	4	-	-	-	4	2	-	-	-	-	5	3	-	-	4	3	-	-	17
7	(Czech Republic) Vlastimil Válek	ČZ	9	7	24	-	-	-	-	7	5	3	7	7	6	5	-	-	-	-	-	-	-	-	6	7	2	2	14
8	(Sweden) Lennart Dahlén	Jawa	5	3	10	8	-	-	-	6	-	-	9	9	-	-	-	-	-	6	-	9	-	-	8	4	-	-	10
9	(Netherlands) Fritz Selling	Greeves	-	11	16	7	6	6	-	-	-	-	15	12	-	-	3	5	-	-	-	-	-	-	-	-	3	3	9
10	(West Germany) Fritz Betzelbacher	Maico	7	6	8	9	9	8	-	-	-	-	5	6	-	-	-	4	-	-	-	-	4	4	-	-	-	-	7
11	(Sweden) Sivert Eriksson	Husqvarna	10	8	13	12	-	10	-	-	-	-	-	-	7	8	-	-	7	4	9	-	7	7	9	6	5	4	7
12	(United Kingdom) John Draper	Cotton	3	10	4	4	7	13	-	-	-	-	6	8	-	-	-	-	3	-	7	7	-	-	-	-	-	-	6
13	(Belgium) Nic Jansen	Greeves	11	-	5	5	10	7	-	-	-	-	12	10	-	-	4	6	-	-	14	10	-	-	-	-	-	-	5
14	(Czech Republic) Miloslav Soucek	ESO	12	13	-	-	-	-	5	3	6	5	-	-	-	-	-	-	-	-	-	-	-	-	-	-	-	-	3
14	(East Germany) Fred Willamowski	MZ	-	-	-	-	-	-	-	-	-	-	-	-	-	-	-	-	-	-	-	-	-	-	-	-	4	5	3
16	(Czech Republic) Josef Chara	Jawa	-	9	9	10	-	-	6	-	-	4	10	11	8	9	-	-	-	5	-	-	-	-	-	-	-	-	4
17	(Italy) Luciano Conti	Aermacchi	-	-	-	-	-	-	-	-	-	-	-	-	-	-	5	7	-	-	-	-	-	-	-	-	-	-	2
17	(West Germany) Gerhard Stauch	Maico	-	-	-	-	-	-	-	-	-	-	-	-	-	-	-	-	6	8	-	-	-	-	-	-	-	-	2
17	(West Germany) Otto Walz	Maico	-	-	-	-	-	-	-	-	-	-	-	-	-	-	-	-	-	-	-	-	8	5	-	-	-	-	2
20	(Italy) Vincenzo Soletti	Parilla	-	-	-	-	-	-	-	-	-	-	-	-	-	-	6	8	-	-	-	-	-	-	-	-	-	-	1
20	(United Kingdom) Bryan Sharp	Greeves	-	-	7	6	-	-	-	-	7	-	11	-	-	-	-	-	-	-	8	-	-	-	-	-	-	-	1
20	(Sweden) Jan Johansson	Husqvarna	-	-	-	-	-	-	-	-	-	-	-	-	-	-	-	-	-	-	-	-	-	-	5	8	-	-	1
20	(East Germany) Paul Friedrichs	ESO	-	-	-	-	-	-	-	-	-	-	-	-	-	-	-	-	-	-	-	-	-	-	-	-	6	6	1
-	(Sweden) Stig Rickardsson	Greeves	-	2	28	-	-	-	-	-	-	-	-	-	-	10	-	-	-	-	-	-	-	-	10	-	-	-	-
-	(Italy) Lanfranco Angelini	Aermacchi	-	-	-	-	-	-	-	-	-	-	-	-	-	-	-	1	-	-	-	-	-	-	-	-	-	-	-
-	(United Kingdom) Don Rickman	Greeves	-	-	-	-	-	-	-	-	-	-	-	-	-	-	-	-	-	-	4	-	-	-	-	-	-	-	-
