= Dougie Lampkin =

British motorcycle racer (born 1976)

Dougie Lampkin MBE
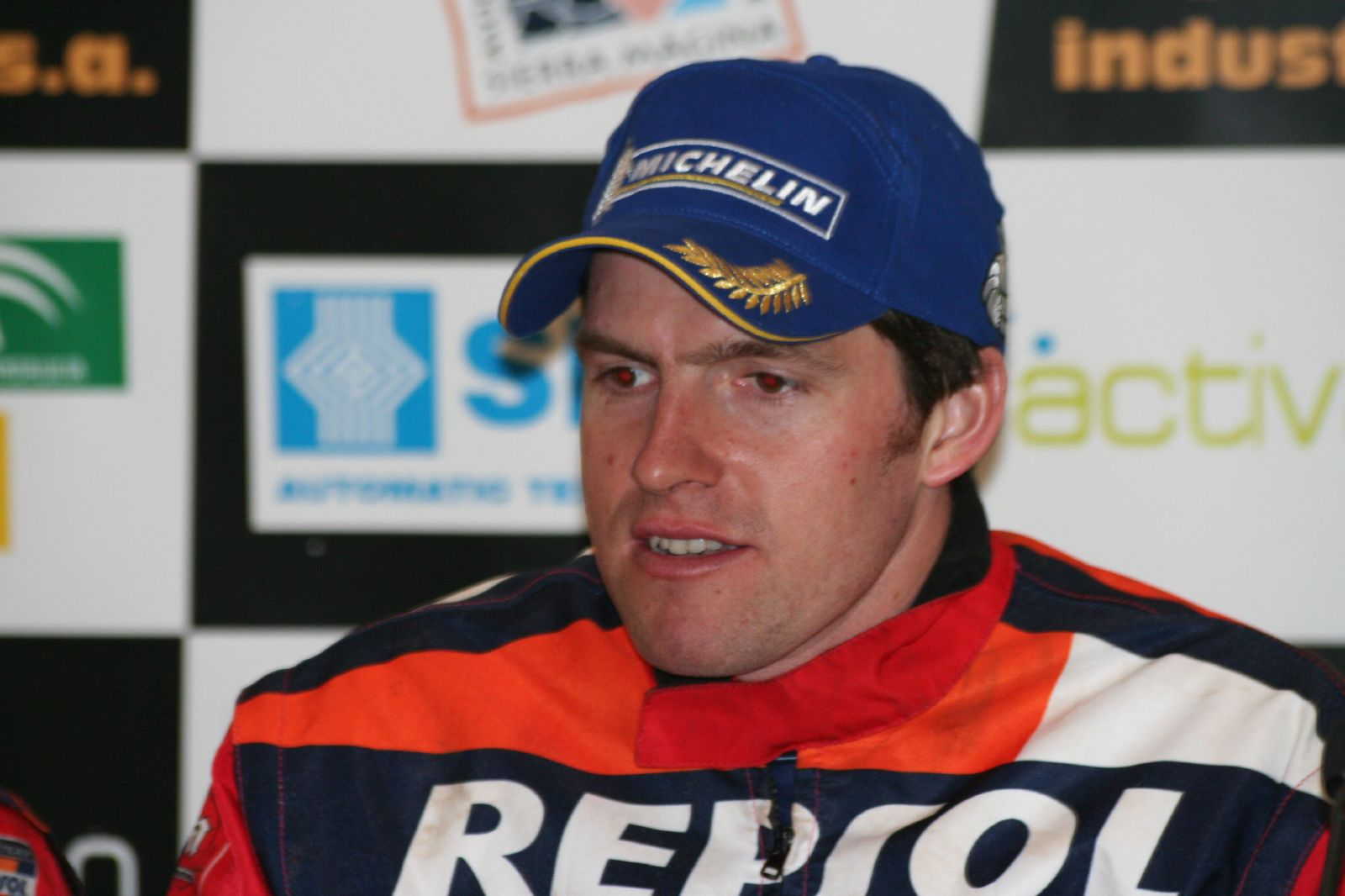
- Nationality: British
- Born: 23 March 1976 (age 50); Silsden, West Yorkshire, England
- Website: Dougie Lampkin

Douglas Martin Lampkin MBE (born 23 March 1976) is an English former professional motorcycle trials and endurocross rider. He competed in the FIM Trial World Championships from 1994 to 2006. Lampkin is notable for being a seven-time motorcycle trials world outdoor champion. He is the second most successful trials rider in history, after Toni Bou with 39 (19 outdoor and 20 indoor). In 2012, Lampkin was named an FIM Legend for his motorcycling achievements.

== Career ==
Lampkin was born in Silsden, West Yorkshire into a family steeped in motorcycle sport. His father, Martin Lampkin, was the first FIM Trial World Championship winner in 1975, and his Uncle, Arthur Lampkin, was also a regular winner on the British circuit in the 1960s.

Lampkin is the first person to have won five consecutive World Indoor (1997–2001) and seven consecutive World Outdoor Championships (1997–2003). He has also won four World Team Championships (Trial des Nations) in years 1997, 1999, 2002 and 2003, six British Adult Championships, two Spanish Adult Championships and the Scottish Six Days Trial on fourteen occasions.

Lampkin now lives on the Isle of Man. In the 2002 New Year Honours, he was appointed a Member of the Order of the British Empire (MBE) for services to Motorcycle Trials Riding.

In 2013, Lampkin participated in Red Bull City Trails event in Manchester, United Kingdom, and later in the Red Bull Sea to Sky event in Turkey.

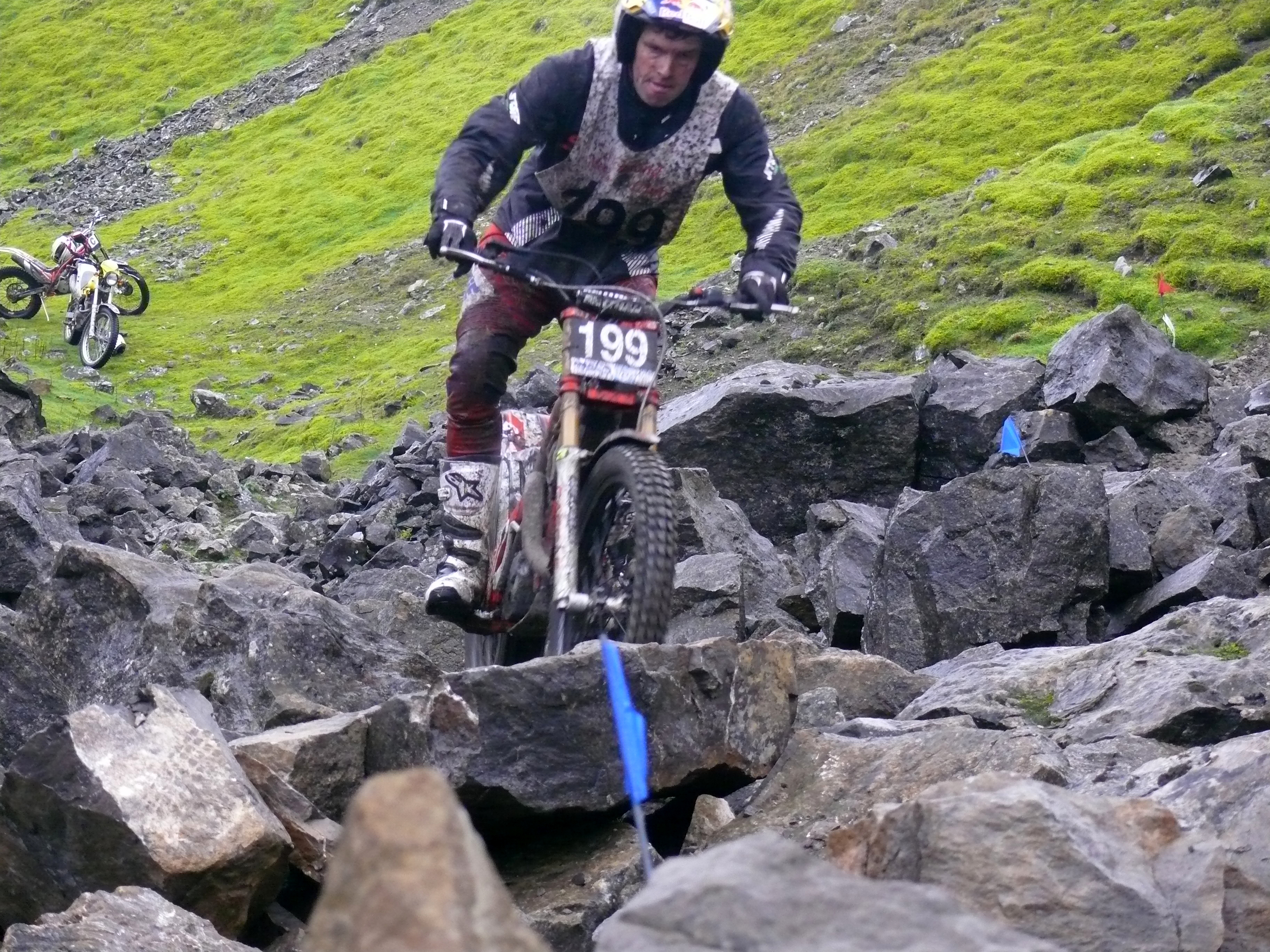
Lampkin winning 2013 Scott Trial

National and international results.
Year	Event	Result
1991	Schoolboy B Class British championship	1st
1992	Schoolboy A Class British championship	1st
1993	European championship	1st
1994	British Adult championship	1st
1994	World championship	6th
1994	Scottish Six Day Trial	1st
1995	British Adult championship	2nd
1995	World championship	4th
1996	World championship	2nd
1996	Scottish Six Day Trial (2)	1st
1997	World championship Indoor	1st
1997	World championship Outdoor	1st
1997	World Team championship	1st
1997	British Adult championship (2)	1st
1998	World championship Indoor (2)	1st
1998	World championship Outdoor (2)	1st
1998	British Adult championship (3)	1st
1999	World championship Indoor (3)	1st
1999	World championship Outdoor (3)	1st
1999	World Team championship (2)	1st
1999	British Adult championship (4)	1st
2000	World championship Indoor (4)	1st
2000	World championship Outdoor (4)	1st
2000	British Adult championship (5)	1st
2001	World championship Indoor (5)	1st
2001	World championship Outdoor (5)	1st
2001	Spanish Adult championship	1st
2002	World championship Outdoor (6)	1st
2002	British Adult championship (6)	1st
2002	World Team championship (3)	1st
2002	World championship Indoor	2nd
2003	World championship Outdoor (7)	1st
2003	World Team championship (4)	1st
2003	Spanish Adult championship (2)	1st
2003	World championship Indoor	2nd
2004	World championship Indoor	3rd
2004	World championship Outdoor	2nd
2005	World championship Indoor	4th
2005	World championship Outdoor	3rd
2006	World championship Indoor	6th
2006	World championship Outdoor	4th

== Honours ==
- British Trials Champion 1994, 1996, 1997, 1998, 1999, 2000, 2001
- Spanish Trials Champion 2001, 2003
- FIM Trials European Champion 1993
- FIM Trials World Champion 1997, 1998, 1999, 2000, 2001, 2002, 2003
- FIM Trials Indoor World Champion 1997, 1998, 1999, 2000, 2001
- Scottish Six Day Trial Winner 1994, 1995, 1996, 2008, 2009, 2012, 2013, 2014, 2015, 2016, 2017, 2018, 2022, 2023
- Scott Trial Winner 1994, 2006, 2007, 2013, 2017, 2018
