= AJS Model 16 =

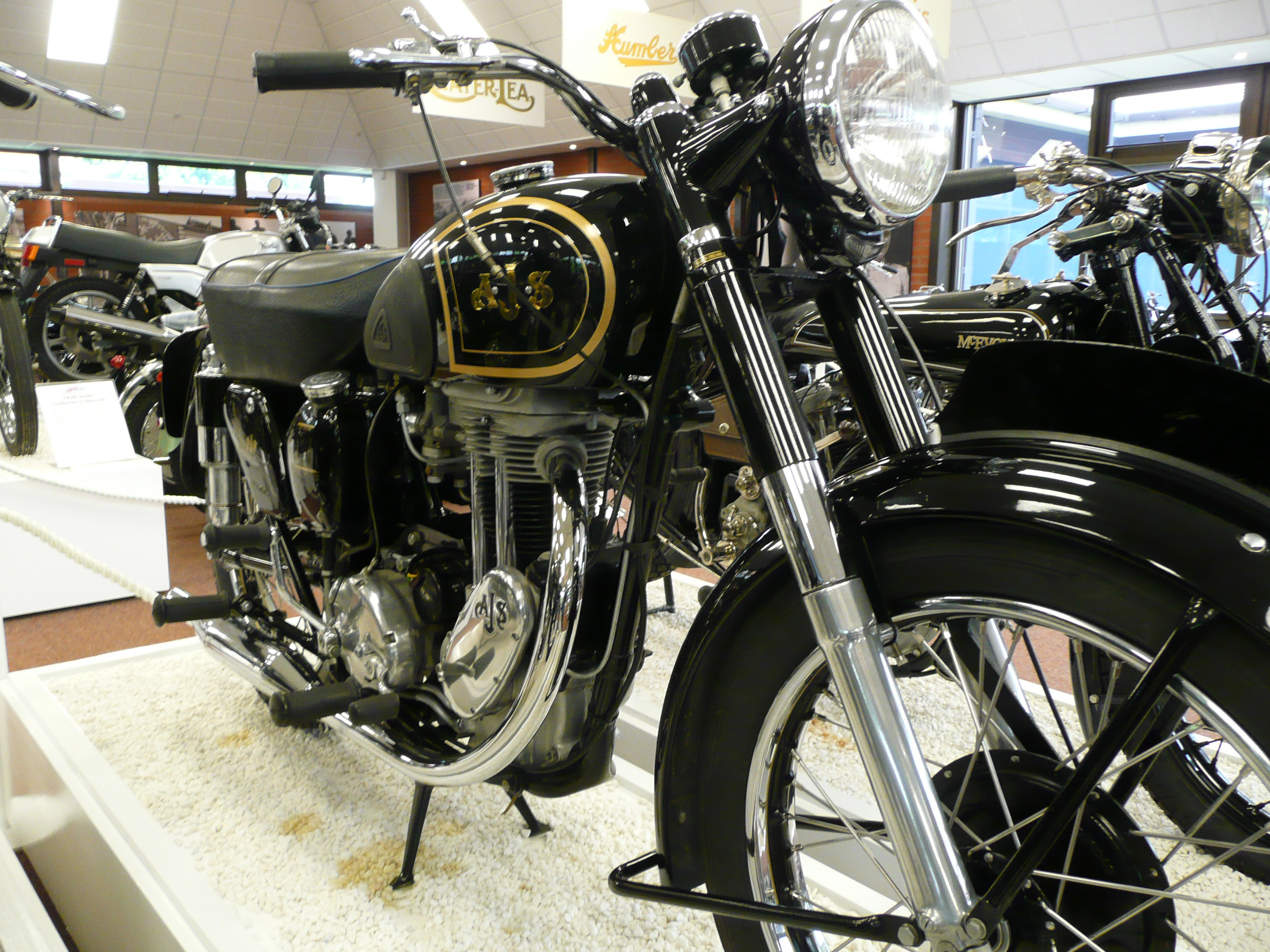
- Manufacturer: Associated Motorcycles Plumstead, London
- Also called: Sceptre Sports
- Engine: 348 cc OHV air cooled single
- Top speed: 78 mph (126 km/h)
- Power: 16 bhp (12 kW) @5,600 rpm
- Transmission: Four speed gearbox to chain final drive
- Suspension: teledraulic forks, swinging arm rear
- Brakes: drum brakes
- Tires: 19 in front and rear
- Wheelbase: 56 inches (140 cm)
- Seat height: 32 inches (81 cm)
- Weight: 382 pounds (173 kg) (dry)

The AJS Model 16 was a British motorcycle made by Associated Motorcycles at the former Matchless works in Plumstead, London.

== Development ==
The rigid framed AJS Model 16M 350 cc single was developed in 1945 from the military Matchless G3/L World War II motorcycle. Well proven in war service, the 350 cc single remained in production selling large numbers to the civilian market well into the 1960s. Simple and practical, the Model 16 needed minimal maintenance and was very economical—ideal during petrol rationing. The company also produced an almost identical motorcycle under the Matchless name as the Matchless G3L. The only difference between the two was that the Matchless carried a magneto at the rear of the cylinder barrel, whereas the AJS magneto was at the front.

In 1953, the Model 16M was modernised with a dual seat replacing the saddle and rear pillion seat. In 1956 the Burman gearbox was replaced with a new four speed unit of AMC's own design and in 1957 further improvements included replacement of the outdated generator with a crankshaft mounted Lucas alternator. The leaky pressed-steel primary drive cover was replaced with an alloy casing.

== AJS Model 16MS ==
Neither AJS or Matchless opted for plunger type rear springing, and the Model 16 retained a rigid rear frame until 1949, when pivoted rear suspension controlled by hydraulically dampened spring units designed and made by Matchless became available. The difference was indicated by the S (for springer) designation.

== AJS Model 16MC ==
The rugged and reliable AJS Model 16 was ideal for the increasingly popular sport of motorcycle trials. Gaining a C (for competition) designation, modifications included upgrading the frame to a welded duplex tubular frame with an engine cradle to reduce weight and redesigned exhaust and footrests to improve ground clearance. In 1957 it was further redesigned to increase clearance from 7 to 10 inches (180 to 250 millimetres). Hugh Viney led the AJS works team in the post war years and won the challenging 1947 Scottish Six Days Trial on an AJS 16MC at his first attempt—then repeated the achievement the following year and made it three in a row in 1949. In the 1950s this record was beaten by another AJS Works Team rider Gordon Jackson, who won the Scottish Trial four times.

== AJS Model 16C ==
In 1964 the AJS Model 16C was launched with a completely redesigned 348 cc engine in which the pushrods were housed in cast cylinder barrel 'tunnels'. The 16C also had a Norton-designed geared oil pump to improve lubrication.

== AJS 16 Sceptre ==
To boost US sales the AMC marketing team rebranded the ageing export Model 16 with the new name The Sceptre with new metal tank badges and steel flywheels instead of the old cast iron ones. The compression ratio was also raised to 9:1 and the competition also Norton designed geared oil pump was also fitted as standard.

== See also ==
- List of motorcycles of the 1940s
- List of motorcycles of the 1950s
