= Graham Jarvis (motorcyclist) =

British motorcyclist

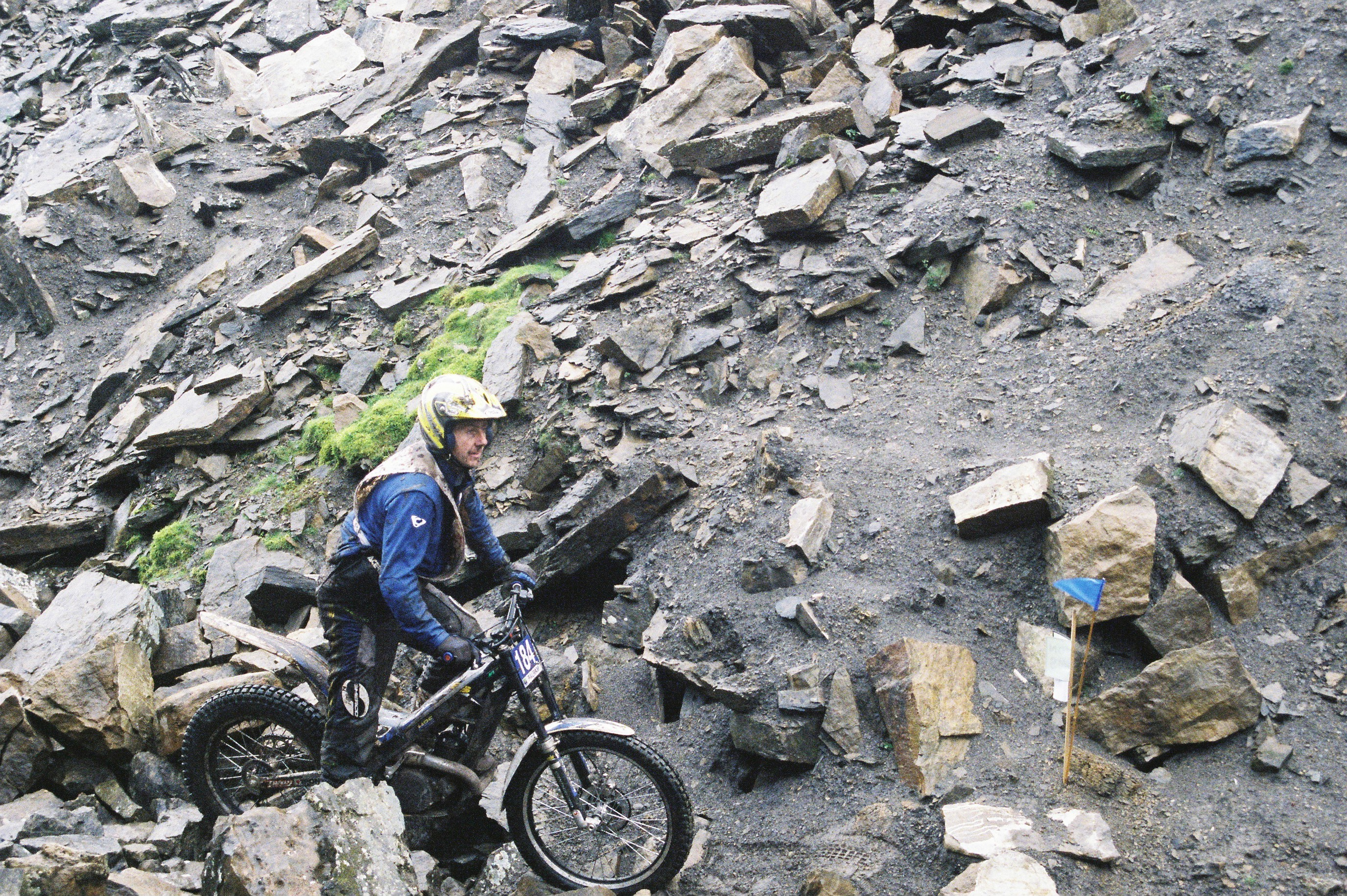
- Scott Trial, 2008
- Born: 21 April 1975 (age 51); Ripon, North Yorkshire, U.K.
- Current team: Husqvarna
- Bike number: 1
- Website: Official web site

Graham Jarvis (born 21 April 1975) is a British former professional enduro and trials competitor.

His achievements include winning the Scottish Six Days Trial four times and the Scott Trial nine times, more times than any competitor in the event's history. He has been the British Trials Champion five times, and the British Enduro champion five times.

More recently he has continued on to success within the Extreme Enduro segment placing prominently in several high-profile events. He has been the winner of Red Bull Romaniacs seven times, the Erzberg Rodeo Red Bull Hare Scramble five times, the Red Bull Sea to Sky six times, Hells Gate five times, and Roof of Africa four times.

As of August 2018 Graham Jarvis is a Factory Team Rider for Husqvarna Motorcycles riding a Husqvarna Factory Racing TE 300i.

== Results podium ==
Red Bull Romaniacs
Year	Place	Machine
2022	1	Husqvarna TE 300 2 stroke
2020	2	Husqvarna TE 300 2 stroke
2019	3	Husqvarna TE 300 2 stroke
2017	1	Husqvarna TE 300 2 stroke
2016	1	Husqvarna TE 300 2 stroke
2015	2	Husqvarna TE 300 2 stroke
2014	2	Husqvarna TE 300 2 stroke
2013	1	Husaberg 300
2012	1	Husaberg 300
2011	1	Husaberg 300
2010	2	Sherco 300
2008	1	Sherco 300

Red Bull Erzberg Rodeo
Year	Place	Machine
2024	4	GBR – Husqvarna
2019	1	Husqvarna TE 300 2 stroke
2018	1	Husqvarna TE 300 2 stroke
2017	2	Husqvarna TE 300 2 stroke
2016	1	Husqvarna TE 300 2 stroke
2015	1	Husqvarna TE 300 2 stroke
2014	2	Husqvarna TE 300 2 stroke
2013	1	Husaberg 300

British Trials Championship
Year	Place	Machine
2005	1	Sherco
2002	1	
2000	1	
1999	1	
1998	1	
