= James Dabill =

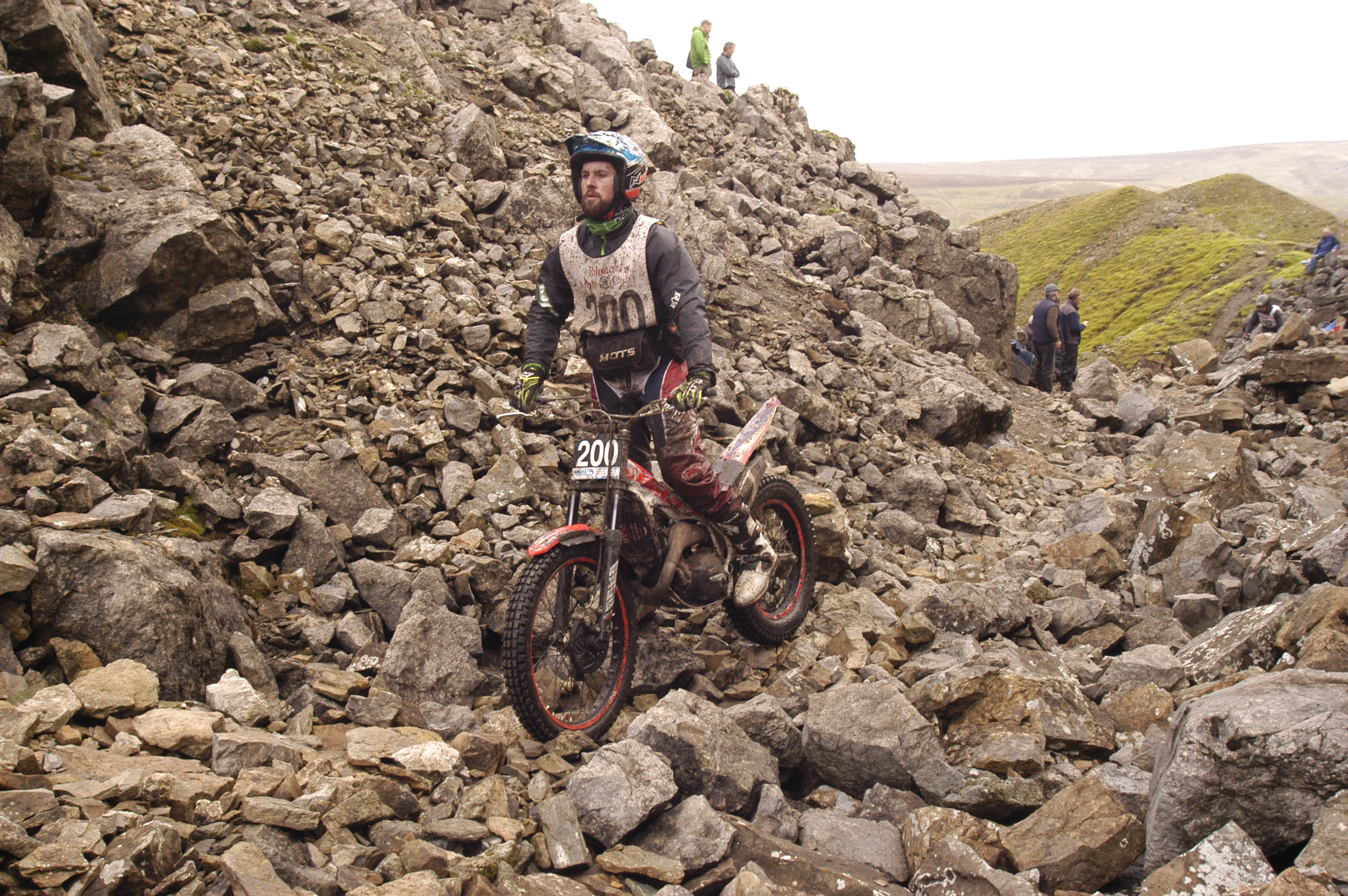
- Scott Trial 2014
- Nationality: (United Kingdom) British
- Born: 18 April 1986 (age 40)

James Dabill (born 18 April 1986) is an English professional motorcycle trials rider.

Dabill was the Junior World champion in 2005 and the European champion in 2006. His other achievements include winning the Scottish Six Days Trial twice and the Scott Trial three times. He has been the British Trials Champion seven times.
