= Scott Trial =

British motorcycle trials competition

Coordinates: 54°24′25″N 1°48′48″W

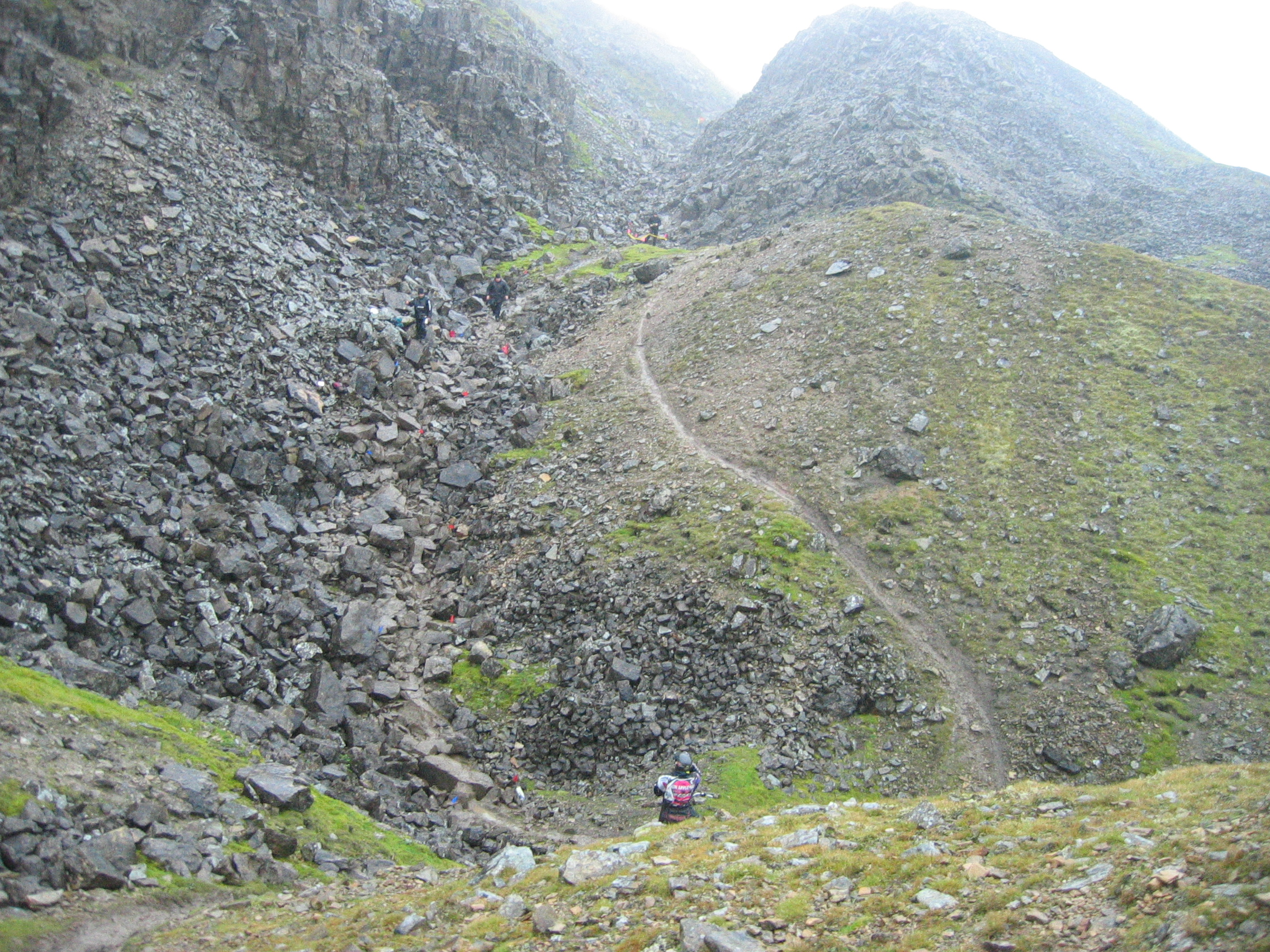
2009 Scott Trial, Section 39

The Scott Trial is a British motorcycle trials competition dating from 1914 run over an off-road course of approximately 70 miles (110 km). One of the most challenging trials events in the UK, its appeal is to clubman riders as well as international professional riders. The Scott raises money for the "Scott charities", a range of local non-profit making organisations.

== History ==
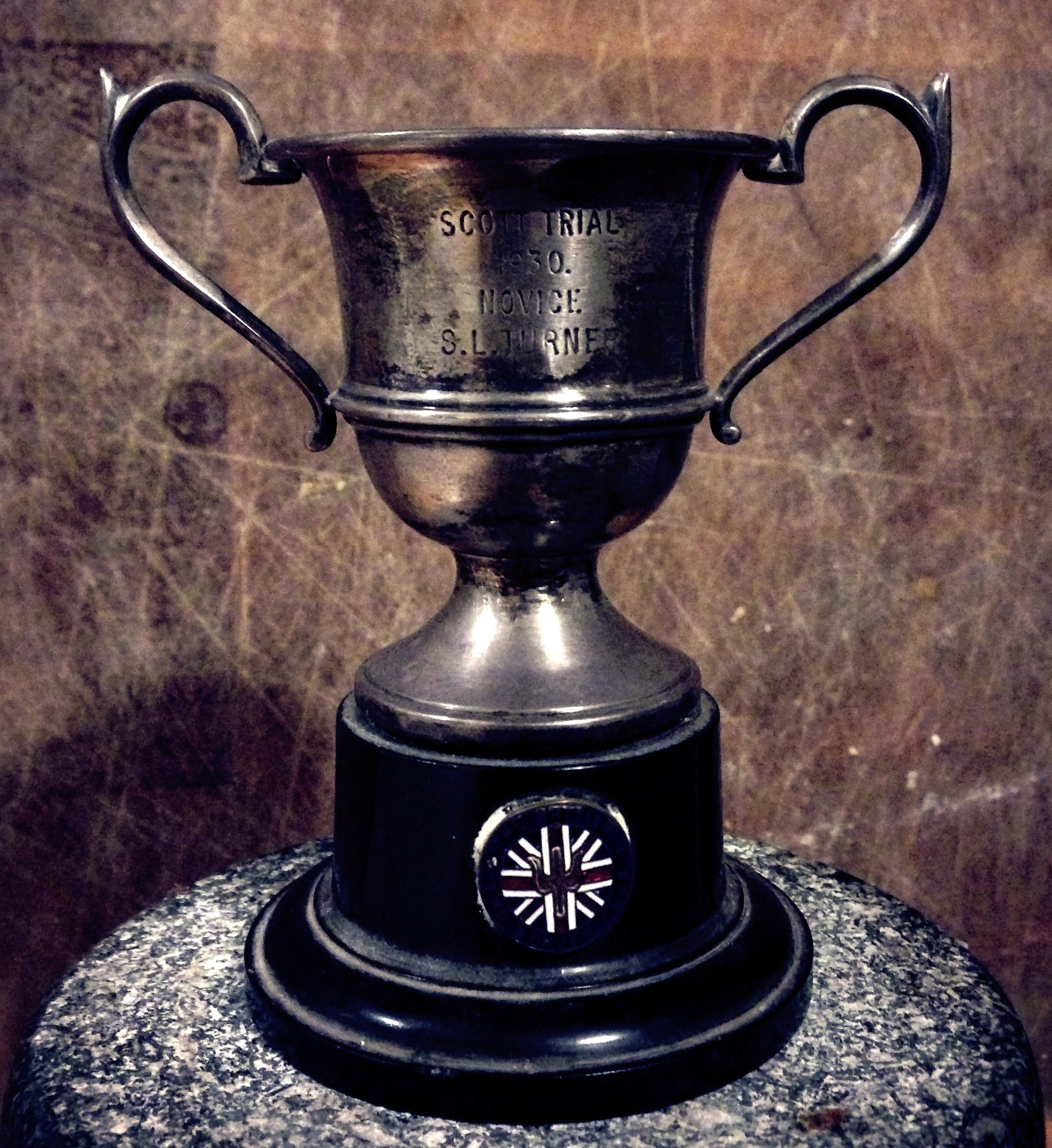
Scott Trial cup. 1930 Novice. S.L. Turner

The Scott Trial began in 1914 when Alfred Angas Scott, inventor and founder of the Scott Motorcycle Company challenged the workers at his factory to ride from the factory in Shipley through the Yorkshire Dales to Burnsall, a riverside village near Grassington. Of the 14 starters only 9 finished. The event was reintroduced after the First World War in 1919 and although Alfred Scott died in 1923 the event continued to be run by the Scott workers until 1926.

The Bradford and District Motor Club then took over the management of the event and moved the start and finish to Blubberhouses, a small village in the borough of Harrogate in North Yorkshire. In 1938 the land was owned by Leeds Corporation Waterworks which decided not to allow motorcycle trials on their property, so the trial was moved again to Swainby, on the north western corner of the North York Moors National Park in Cleveland and control was taken over by the Middlesbrough and Stockton Motor Clubs.

== Swaledale ==
In 1950 the Auto-Cycle Union, the governing body of motorcycle sport in Great Britain, divided the area into the North Eastern Centre and the Yorkshire Centre and the Scott Trial was moved to Swaledale, one of the northernmost dales in the Yorkshire Dales National Park, where it has remained to this day. The Darlington and District Motor Club took over the organisation until 1990, when the Richmond Motor Club took over. The competition was still running as of 2023, with 190 entrants that year.

== The 1962 Scott Trial ==
In his career of over 1000 wins trials champion Sammy Miller considers the 1962 Scott Trial as the greatest ever. A week of rain meant the course was muddy and dangerous. Conditions were so bad that only 40 finished from a field of 185 that started, with Miller's Ariel 500 cc a clear winner. This was Miller's second of seven Scott Trial wins.

== Present day ==
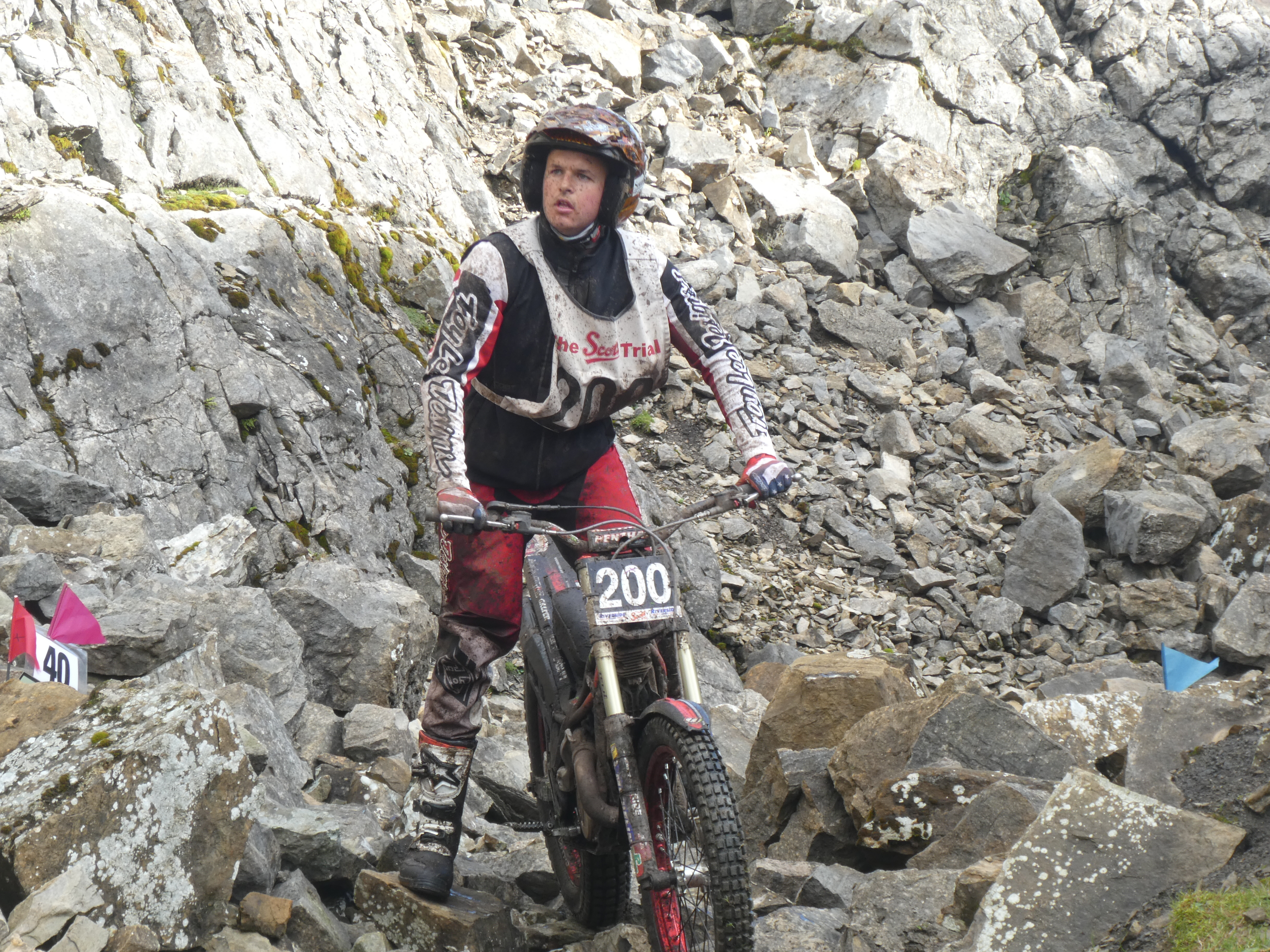
Jack Price was the winner in 2022, and also in 2023

The current Scott Trial continues to be a time and observation event run over an off-road course of 84 miles (135 km), divided into 76 sections. Riders lose marks for putting a foot down or "footing" in the observed sections and for finishing behind the fastest rider. Over the years a huge range of special awards and memorial trophies have become associated with the Scott Trial, including 'best performing Yorkshireman' and 'oldest official finisher'. As in 1962 the weather can be as harsh as the course. In 1998 only 27 of the 147 entries completed the course. On this occasion Graham Jarvis won for the third time with the fastest time of 5 hours 50 minutes. In 2008, rain reduced the finishers to 60 out of 200 with Jarvis winning for the 8th time. In 2009 Graham Jarvis won again despite being 28 minutes slower than the previous years runner-up James Dabill. His unique skill over the sections, losing him 22 points compared to Dabill's 38, gave him his ninth win.

The 2023 Trial, with 190 entrants, was won by Jack Price who scored the most points, although Jonathan Richardson was "the first rider home".

== Women competitors ==
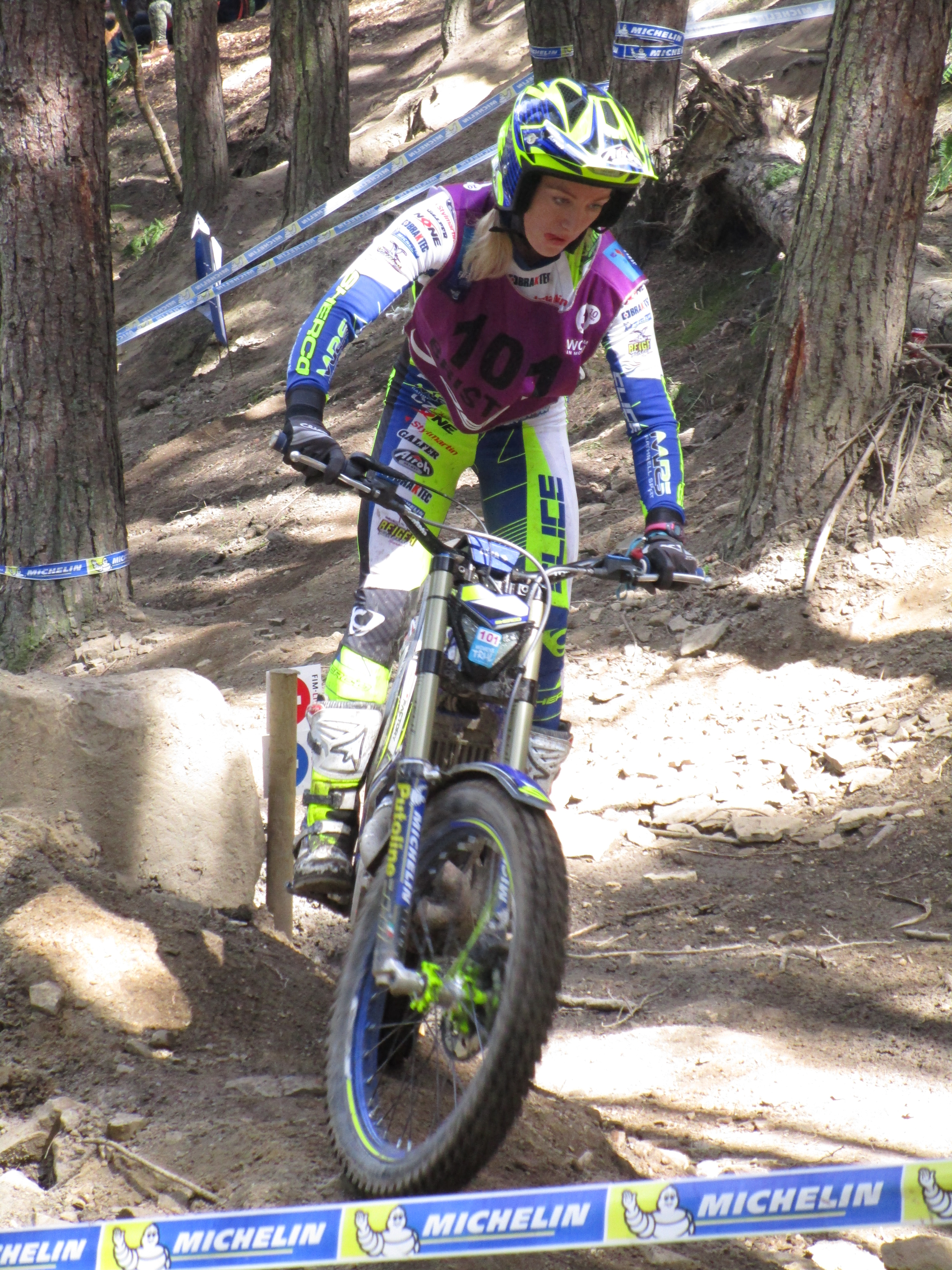
Emma Bristow, 2023 MHT Trophy winner (2016 photo)

The first woman to start a Scott Trial was Mrs E. Knowles in 1921. In 1926 Miss Majorie Cottle was the first female official finisher. It was her second attempt and she finished on a further three occasions, the last in 1931. From 1925 Miss E. Foley entered six times but never finished. Before 1940 a further eight women competed but none officially completed the course.

From 1950 to 2001 there were seven female riders, three making two attempts, and one entering three times, but none were successful.

Katy Sunter's first of fourteen attempts was in 2002, and since then she has had ten official finishes. The new wave of women competitors has seen twelve other women enter, of whom Emma Bristow has finished nine times, Chloe Richardson eight times and Maria Conway twice.

In 2023, Emma Bristow, who had been declared the Women’s World Championship rider on nine occasions, finished in 40th place due to mechanical difficulties, but again won the MHT Trophy for the "best performance by a lady rider".

== Gallery ==
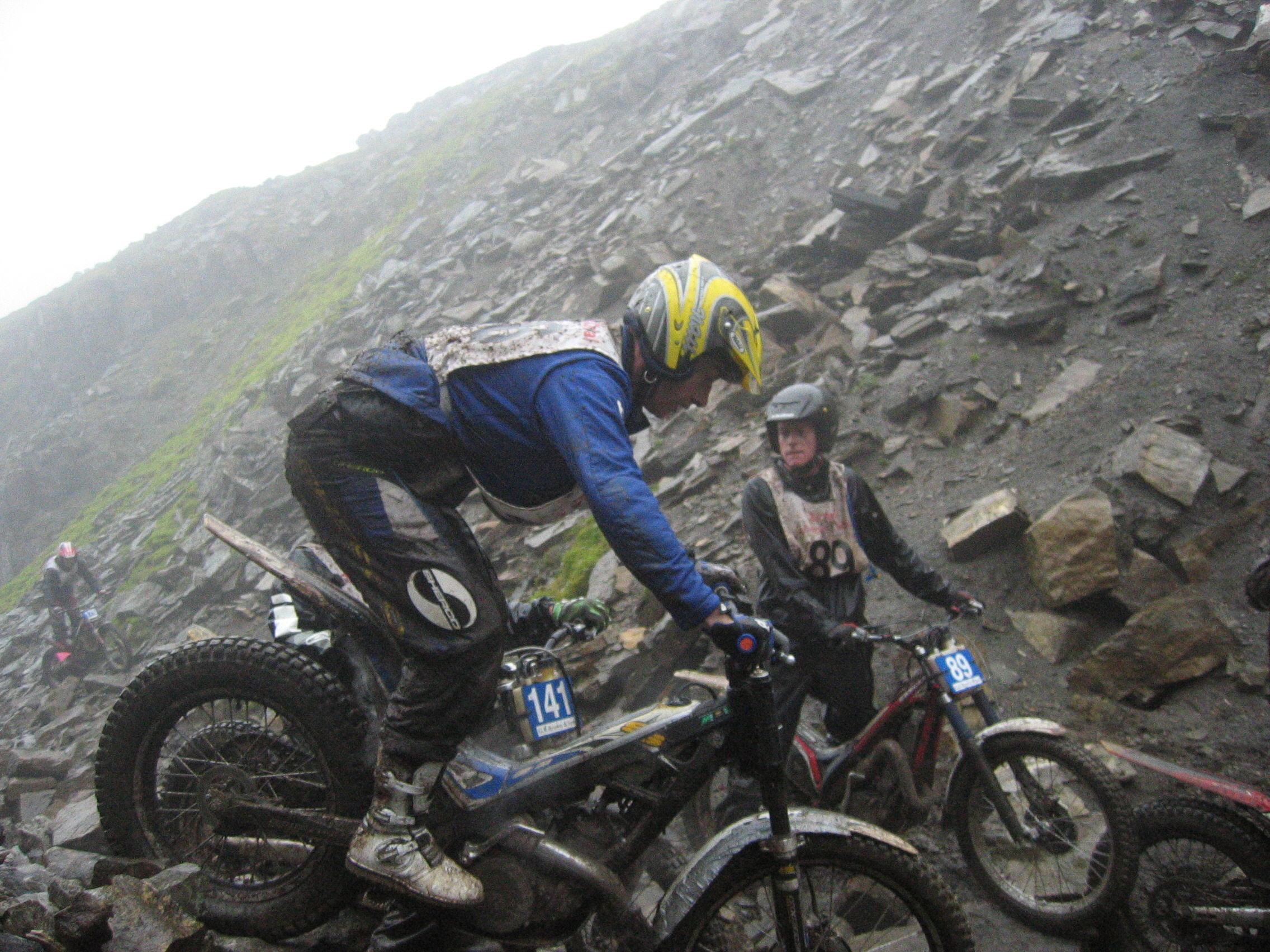
Graham Jarvis, winner 2009. Section 41.

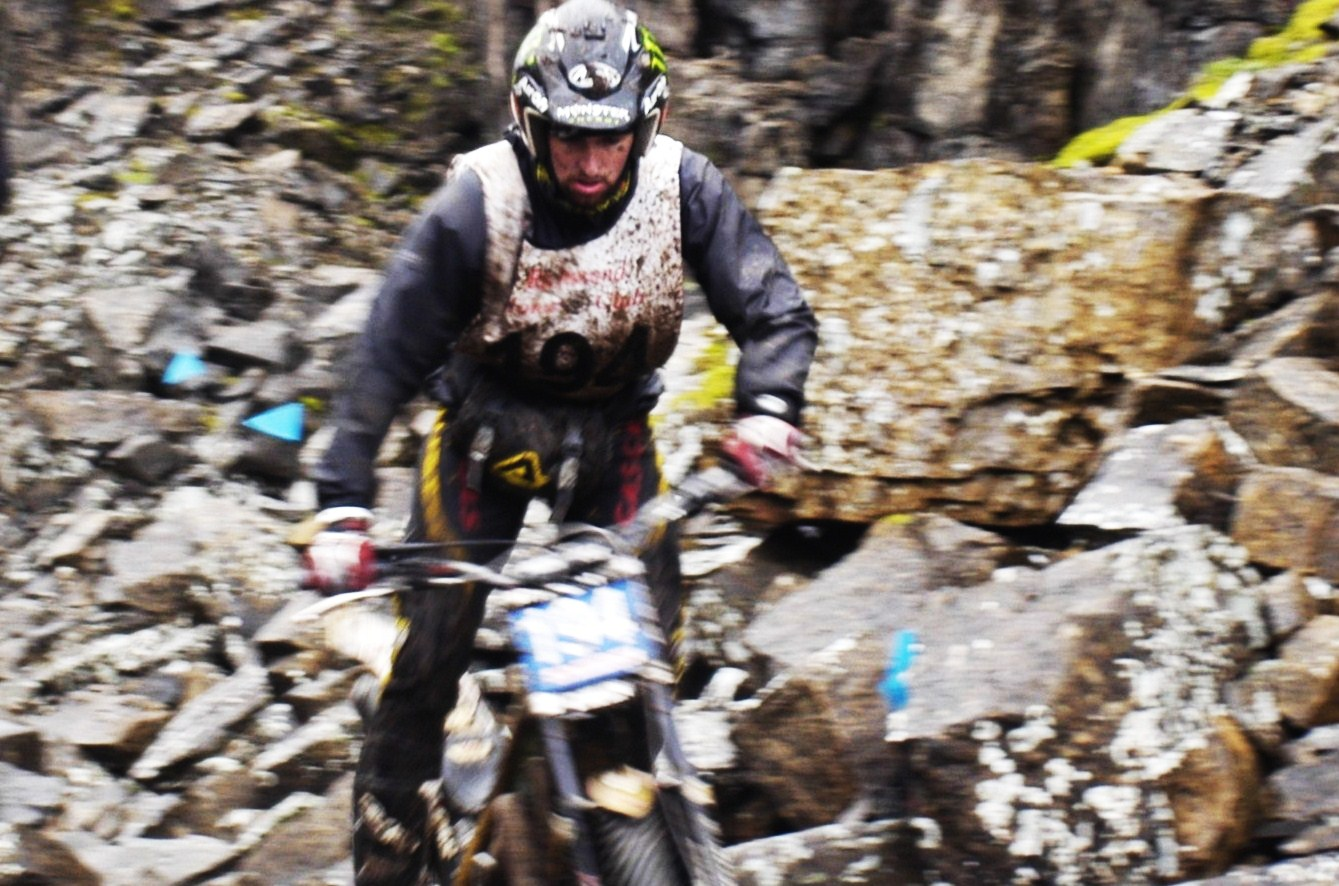
James Dabill, winner 2010.

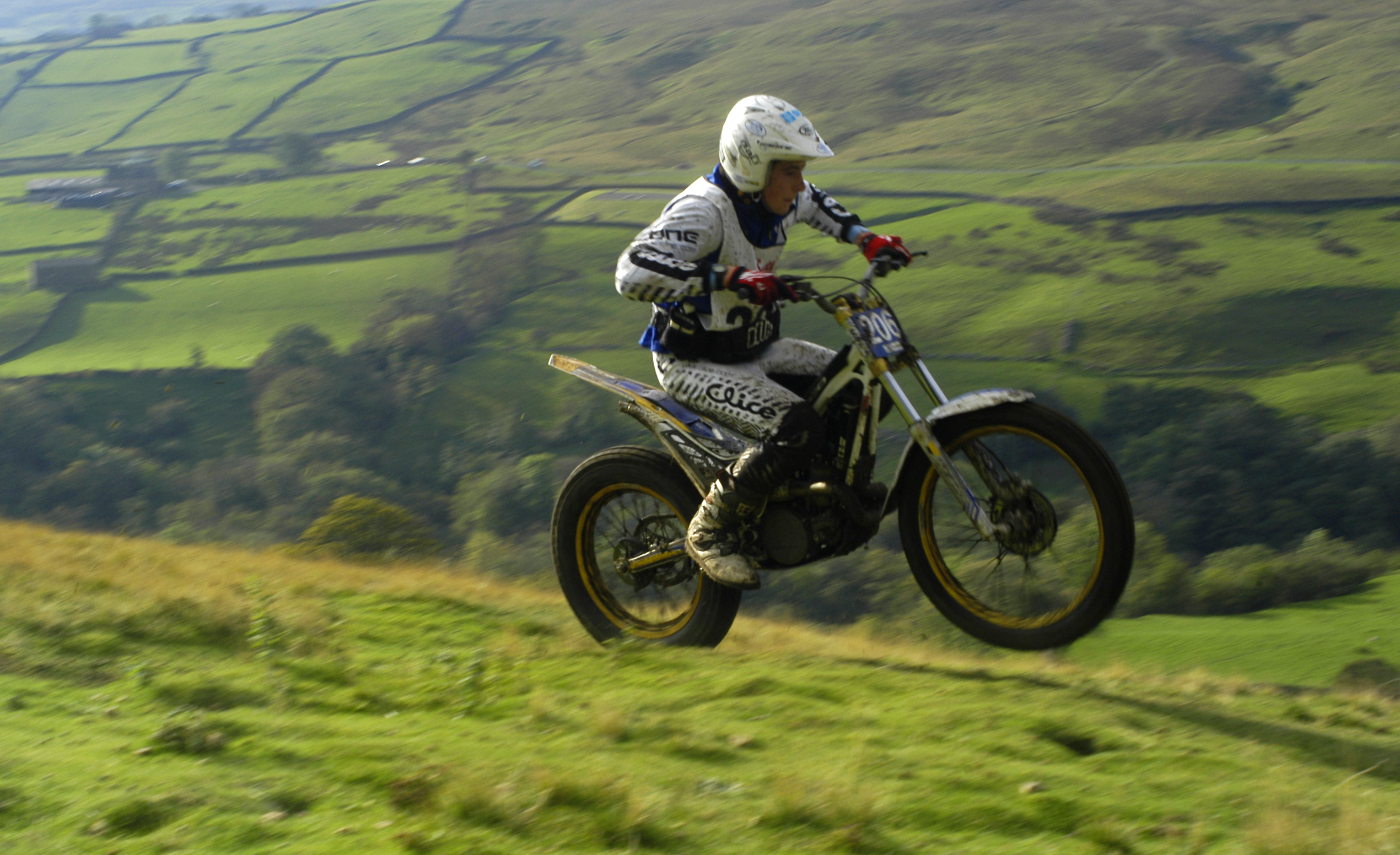
Jonathan Richardson, winner 2011.

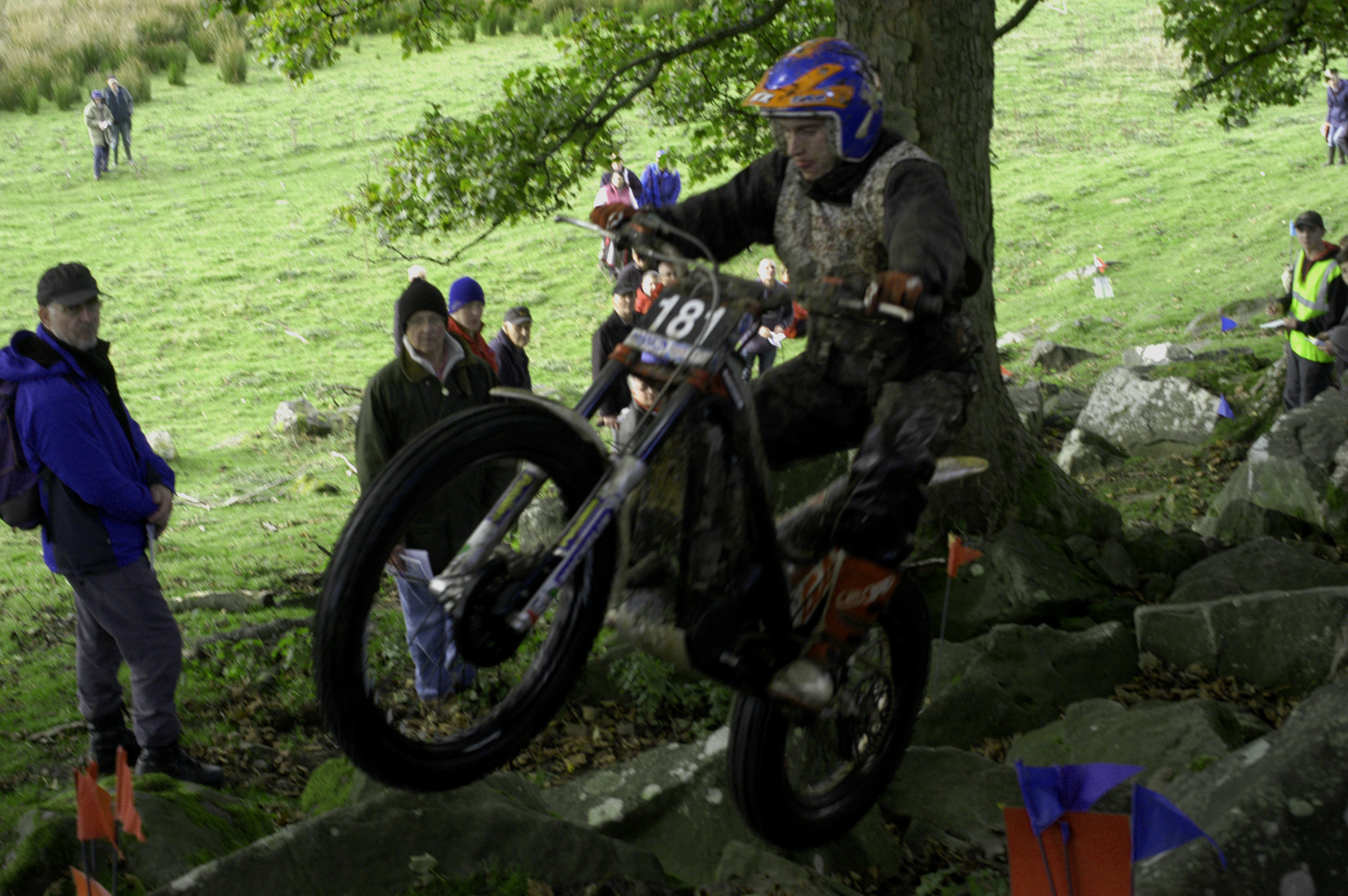
Michael Brown, winner 2012.

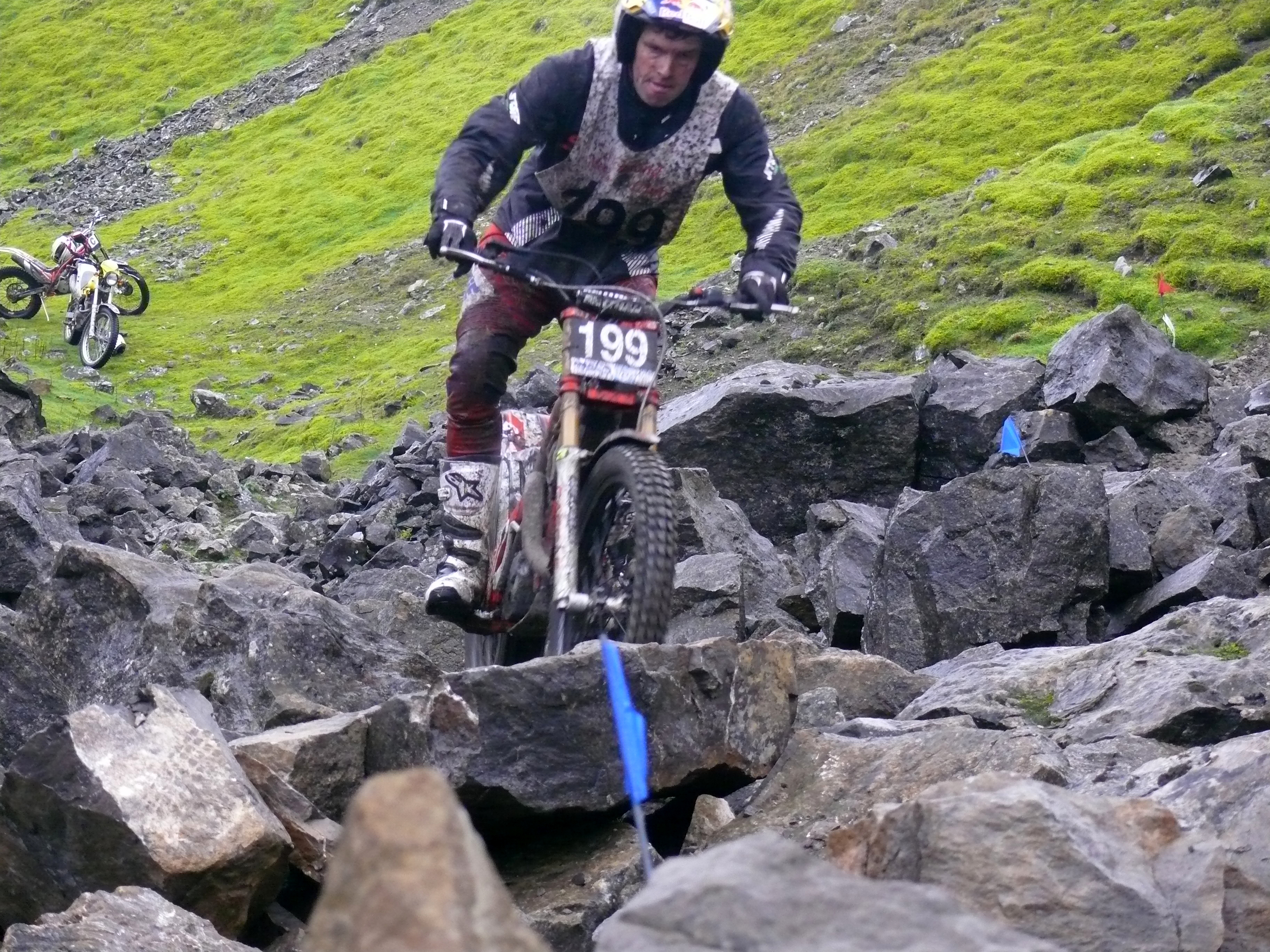
Dougie Lampkin, winner 2013. Section 40.

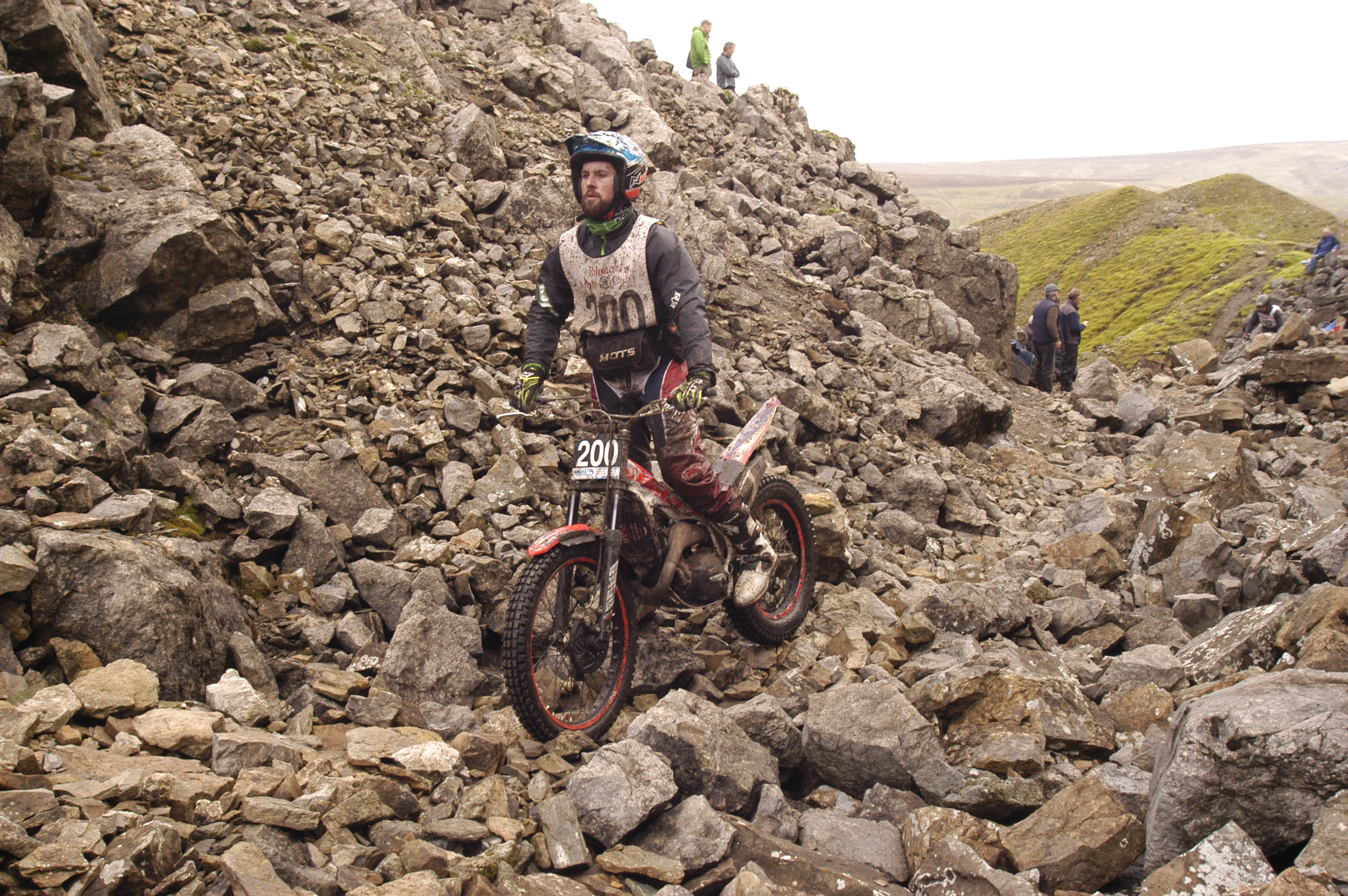
James Dabill, winner 2014. Section 41.

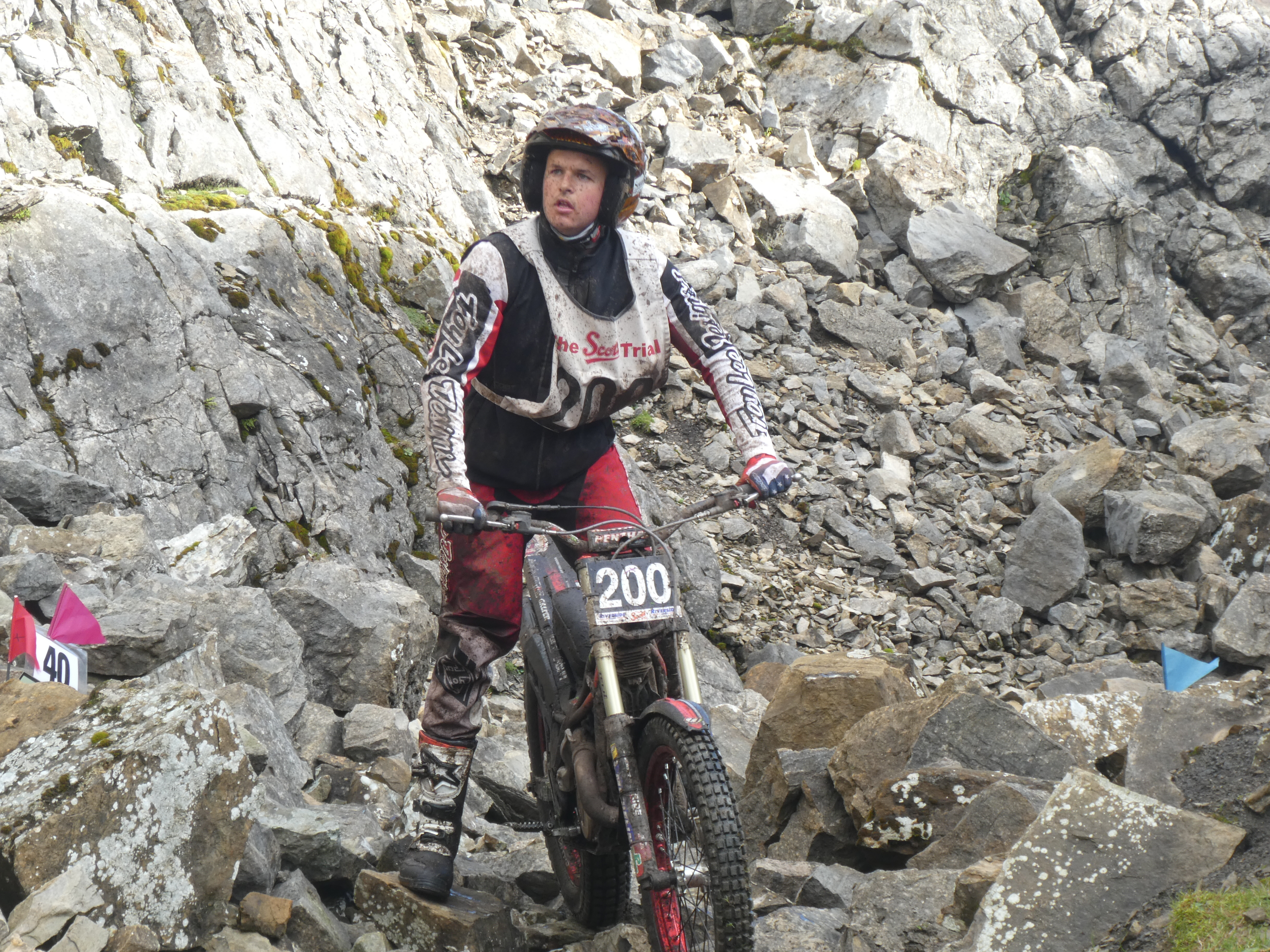
Jack Price, winner Scott Trial 2022. Section 40.

== Scott Trial Winners ==
Year	Entries	Finishers	%	Winner	Fastest	Fastest Time
1914	14	9	64	Frank Philip (Scott)	Frank Philip	
				World War I - 1914 to 1918		
1919	74	35	47	Geoff Hill (Triumph)	Geoff Hill	
1920	131	64	49	J.O. Vessey (Scott)	J.O.Vessey	
1921	50	29	58	Clarrie Wood (Scott)	Clarrie Wood	
1922	58	27	47	Harry Langman (Scott)	Billy Moore (Scott)	
1923	80	30	38	E. Mainwaring (Scott)	Clarrie Wood (Scott)	
1924	90	35	39	W.H. Clough (Scott)	W.H. Clough	
1925	117	64	54	Eddie Flintoff (Sunbeam)	A. Jackson (AJS)	
1926	134	30	23	Eddie Flintoff (Sunbeam)	W. Evans (Triumph)	19.75 mph
1927	145	60	41	Oliver Langton (Scott)	W. Evans (Triumph)	
1928	116	51	44	Eric Langton (Scott)	Eddie Flintoff (Sunbeam)	
1929	119	97	80	Vic Brittain (Sunbeam)	Eddie Flintoff (Sunbeam)	
1930	92	38	41	Len Heath (Ariel)	Allan Jefferies (AJS)	2:19:54
1931	100	63	63	Vic Brittain (Sunbeam)	Stanley Woods (Norton)	2:39:44
1932	94	70	74	Allan Jefferies (Scott)	Allan Jefferies	2:30:00
1933	69	32	46	Len Heath (Ariel)	Len Heath	
1934	69	38	55	Ken Wilson (Panther)	Ken Wilson	2:00:00
1935	74	42	57	Len Heath (Ariel)	Allan Jefferies	2:28:18
1936	80	38	48	Billy Tiffen (Velocette)	Allan Jefferies	2:58:00
1937	89	42	48	Allan Jefferies (Triumph)	Allan Jefferies	1:48:00
1938	86			Len Heath (Ariel)	W.J. Smith (Levis)	3:28:46
				World War 2 - 1939 to 1945		
1946	137			Bill Nicholson (BSA)	Bill Nicholson	3:16:58
1947	147			Bill Nicholson (BSA)	Bill Nicholson	
1948	100			Jim Alves (Triumph)	Jim Alves	3:27:45
1949	137			Bill Nicholson(BSA)	Bill Nicholson	2:40:00
1950	195			Bill Nicholson (BSA)	Bill Nicholson	3:08:00
1951	178			Bill Nicholson (BSA)	Bill Nicholson	3:54:00
1952	169			Johnny Draper (Norton)	David Tye (BSA)	
1953	156			Arthur Shutt (F-Barnett)	David Tye	
1954	140			Jeff Smith (BSA)	Jeff Smith	
1955	145			Johnny Brittain (Royal Enfield)	Gordon Jackson (AJS)	
1956	139			Johnny Brittain (Royal Enfield)	Gordon Jackson	
1957	163			Artie Ratcliffe (Triumph)	Brian Stonebridge (Greeves)	
1958	178			Sammy Miller (Ariel)	Jeff Smith (BSA)	
1959	197			Jeff Smith (BSA)	Jeff Smith	
1960	236			Arthur Lampkin (BSA)	Jeff Smith (BSA)	
1961	180			Arthur Lampkin (BSA)	Arthur Lampkin	
1962	201			Sammy Miller (Ariel)	Sammy Miller	
1963	223			Sammy Miller (Ariel)	Arthur Lampkin (BSA)	
1964	183	72	39	Bill Wilkinson (Greeves)	Bill Wilkinson	
1965	188			Arthur Lampkin (BSA)	Arthur Lampkin	
1966	193	43	22	Alan Lampkin	Arthur Lampkin	
1967	184	40	22	Sammy Miller (Bultaco)	Bill Wilkinsom (Greeves)	
1968	150	46	31	Sammy Miller (Bultaco)	Gordon Farley	
1969	176	44	31	Sammy Miller (Bultaco)	Malcolm Rathmell (Greeves)	
1970	147	61	41	Sammy Miller (Bultaco)	Alan Lampkin (Bultaco)	4:30:03
1971	185	76	41	Malcolm Rathmell (Bultaco)	Alan Lampkin (Bultaco)	4:41:35
1972	195			Rob Shepherd (Montesa)	Rob Shepherd	
1973	201	49	24	Malcolm Rathmell (Bultaco)	Malcolm Rathmell	4:42:35
1974	185	48	26	Rob Edwards (Montesa)	Malcolm Rathmell (Bultaco)	4:38:21
1975	198	44	22	Malcolm Rathmell (Montesa)	Malcolm Rathmell	4:25:00
1976	200	53	27	Malcolm Rathmell (Montesa)	Malcolm Rathmell	4:13:40
1977	195	60	31	Martin Lampkin (Bultaco)	Martin Lampkin	3:46:30
1978	183	76	42	Martin Lampkin (Bultaco)	Martin Lampkin	4:25:10
1979	200	42	21	Malcolm Rathmell (Montesa)	Malcolm Rathmell	4:52:27
1980	177	41	23	Malcolm Rathmell (Montesa)	Malcolm Rathmell	5:13:56
1981	178	62	35	Martin Lampkin (SWM)	Nigel Birkett (Fantic)	4:48:24
1982	140	50	36	Martin Lampkin (SWM)	Malcolm Rathmell (Montesa)	4:36:55
1983	128	70	55	Gerald Richardson (Armstrong)	Gerald Richardson	4:24:14
1984	152	50	33	Nigel Birkett (Yamaha)	Gerald Richardson (Yamaha)	4:32:20
1985	104	63	61	Gerald Richardson (Yamaha)	Gerald Richardson	4:15:45
1986	146	78	53	Tony Scarlett (Yamaha)	Philip Anderson (Yamaha)	4:57:16
1986	146	78	53	Tony Scarlett (Yamaha)	Philip Anderson (Yamaha)	4:57:16
1987	164	99	60	Philip Anderson (Yamaha)	Harold Crawford (Yamaha)	4:44:57
1988	151	71	47	Philip Anderson (Yamaha)	Harold Crawford (Yamaha)	4:32:20
1989	148	91	61	Philip Anderson (Yamaha)	Gerald Richardson (Yamaha)	4:41:02
1990	139	65	47	Robert Crawford (Beta)	Philip Anderson (Yamaha)	5:08:20
1991	145	62	43	Philip Anderson (Yamaha)	Philip Anderson	
1992	142	76	54	Steve Colley (Beta)	Wayne Braybrook (GasGas)	5:04:30
1993	140	69	49	Steve Colley (Beta)	Robert Crawford (Aprilia)	5:19:42
1994	166	68	41	Dougie Lampkin (Beta)	Dougie Lampkin	5:25:17
1995	142	80	56	Robert Crawford (Yamaha)	Robert Crawford	4:27:47
1996	129	74	57	Graham Jarvis (Scorpa)	Steve Colley (GasGas)	4:56:40
1997	138	78	57	Graham Jarvis (Mail Marketing Scorpa)	Graham Jarvis	5:20:08
1998	147	27	18	Graham Jarvis (Mail Marketing Scorpa)	Graham Jarvis	5:50:40
1999	175	76	43	Graham Jarvis (MM Bultaco)	Wayne Braybrook (Silkolene Montesa)	5:11:17
2000	195	83	43	Wayne Braybrook (Silkolene Montesa)	Henry Moorhouse (280 Haven GasGas)	5:22:13
2001				Foot and Mouth		
2002	200	86	43	Michael Philipson (Beta)	Ben Hemingway (Beta)	5:38:25
2003	200	83	42	Graham Jarvis (Sherco)	Graham Jarvis	4:45:28
2004	200	68	34	Graham Jarvis (Sherco)	Graham Jarvis	5:15:26
2005	200	78	39	Graham Jarvis (MRS Sherco 290)	Ian Austermuhle (Beta UK.com 270)	5:10:23
2006	200	80	40	Dougie Lampkin (Montesa)	Dougie Lampkin	4:56:49
2007	200	85	42	Dougie Lampkin (Repsol Montesa 4RT 249)	Dougie Lampkin	4:53:30
2008	180	60	33	Graham Jarvis (MRS Sherco 290)	James Dabill (Sandford Montesa 300)	5:02:48
2009	169	79	47	Graham Jarvis (MRS Sherco 290)	James Dabill (JST Montesa)	5:13:32
2010	200	73	37	James Dabill (JST GasGas UK 300)	Michael Brown (MRS Sherco)	5:08:48
2011	210	85	42	Jonathan Richardson (Sherco - MIAL MRS)	John Sunter (Montesa Appleyard)	4:41:58
2012	191	71	37	Michael Brown (Gas Gas 300-JST)	Michael Brown	5:00:09
2013	186	71	38	Dougie Lampkin (Gas Gas 300)	Jonathan Richardson (Ossa 280)	5:18:04
2014	200	94	47	James Dabill (Beta-uk.com 300)	John Sunter (Appleyard Montessa 250)	5:01:40
2015	197	101	51	Ian Austermuhle (Beta UK 300)	Jonathan Richardson (Beta UK)	4:42:22
2016	200	88	44	James Dabill (Vertigo)	Jonathan Richardson (Sherco)	5:00:29
2017	198	87	44	Dougie Lampkin (Vertigo)	James Dabill (Gas Gas)	5:15:19
2018	200	80	40	Dougie Lampkin (Vertigo)	Jack Price (Gas Gas)	5:07:17
2019	180	77	42	James Dabill (Beta)	Jonathan Richardson (Montesa)	4:59:14
				Covid		
2021	190	95	50	Jack Price (Vertigo)	Guy Kendrew (Gas Gas)	5:17:56
2022	200	126		Jack Price (Vertigo)	Jonathan Richardson (TRS UK)	5:00:18

== See also ==
- Scottish Six Days Trial
