= Arthur Lampkin =

English motorcycle racer (1938–2026)

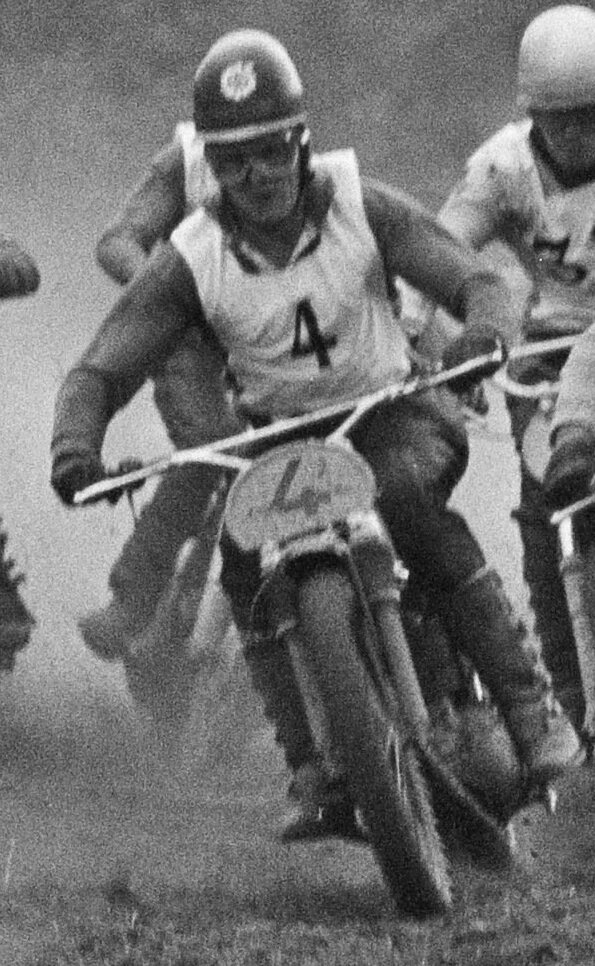
- Lampkin competing in the 1967 Motocross Des Nations
- Nationality: British
- Born: 30 May 1938 Kent, England
- Died: 21 February 2026 (aged 87)

Motocross career
- Years active: 1959–1968
- Teams: BSA
- Wins: 7

Arthur Lampkin (30 May 1938 – 21 February 2026) was an English professional motorcycle racer. The oldest son in a Yorkshire motorcycling dynasty, he competed in a variety of off-road motorcycle events such as observed trials, motocross and enduros. Lampkin, along with Dave Bickers and Jeff Smith, were part of a group British motorcyclists that dominated the sport of motocross in the early 1960s.

== Motorcycling career ==
Born in Kent, England, Lampkin's father moved the family to Silsden, West Yorkshire in 1941 to escape the German bombing campaign during The Blitz. He began riding his father's BSA motorcycle even before he was old enough to have a licence. Lampkin purchased his first motorcycle from money he had earned from his paper round, and by the age of 17, he became the youngest ever member of the BSA factory racing team. He remained with the BSA team for his entire racing career with the exception of 1964 when he rode a Cotton motorcycle. Lampkin won the 1956 British trials national championship at the age of 18. He was known for his successful performances during wintertime motorcycle off-road scrambles competitions that were televised by the BBC program Grandstand.

In the 1961 European motocross championships, Lampkin engaged in a season-long battle with Bickers (Greeves) for the 250cc championship. He won the Italian, German and Swiss Grands Prix and placed second five times but lost the championship to Bickers by 3 points. Lampkin actually scored more points overall than Bickers, but fell victim to FIM scoring rules which only recognize the top-seven of thirteen results.

The following year, the championship was upgraded to world championship status and Lampkin finished the year in third place behind Torsten Hallman (Husqvarna) and Jeff Smith (BSA). He was also a member of British motocross teams that won the 250cc Trophée des Nations events in 1961 and 1962, as well as the 1965 500cc Motocross des Nations event.

Lampkin continued to compete in other off-road motorcycle competitions, winning prestigious events such as the 1963 Scottish Six Days Trial, and the Scott Trial in 1960, 1961 and 1965. He also competed internationally in enduro events, representing Great Britain and earning a gold medal in the 1966 International Six Days Trial held in Sweden.

Lampkin won eight individual heat races and seven Grand Prix victories during his world championship racing career. He won the 500cc British motocross national championship in 1959 and the 250cc British motocross national championship in 1961, the same year that he was the 250cc World Vice Champion. He was a member of two victorious British Trophée des Nations teams (1961, 1962), and five consecutive victories as a member of the British Motocross des Nations team (1963-1967).

Lampkin's younger brothers, Alan and Martin Lampkin also experienced success in motorcycle competitions. Alan won the British trials championship while Martin became a British trials champion as well as winning the 1975 FIM Trial World Championship.

== Later life and death ==
After retiring from competition, Lampkin took over his father's engineering business. Lampkin's nephew, the son of Martin Lampkin, is twelve-time trials world champion, Dougie Lampkin.

Lampkin died on 21 February 2026, at the age of 87, after a battle with cancer.

== Motocross Grand Prix results ==
Points system from 1952 to 1968:

Position	1st	2nd	3rd	4th	5th	6th
Points	8	6	4	3	2	1

Denotes European motocross championship only.

Year	Class	Machine	1		2		3		4		5		6		7		8		9		10		11		12		13		14		15		Pos	Pts
Year	Class	Machine	R1	R2	R1	R2	R1	R2	R1	R2	R1	R2	R1	R2	R1	R2	R1	R2	R1	R2	R1	R2	R1	R2	R1	R2	R1	R2	R1	R2	R1	R2	Pos	Pts
1960	250cc	BSA	CH; 7	CH; 2	BEL; 1	BEL; 4	FRA -	FRA -	TCH -	TCH -	POL -	POL; 2	ITA; 11	ITA -	GDR; 6	GDR; 3	FIN; 1	FIN; 1	LUX; 19	LUX -	UK; 3	UK -	SWE; 3	SWE; 6	GER; 3	GER; 6							5th	25
1960	500cc	BSA	AUT -	AUT -	FRA -	FRA -	SWE -	SWE -	ITA -	ITA -	GER -	GER -	UK; 3	UK; 7	NED -	NED -	BEL -	BEL -	LUX -	LUX -													13th	3
1961	250cc	BSA	BEL; 2	BEL -	FRA -	FRA -	NED; 2	NED; 4	TCH; 4	TCH; 2	POL; 3	POL; 2	LUX; 3	LUX; 4	FIN; 5	FIN; 1	ITA; 2	ITA; 2	GER; 1	GER; 2	UK; 2	UK; 2	CH; 1	CH; 2	SWE; 2	SWE; 2	GDR -	GDR -					2nd	48
1961	500cc	BSA	CH -	CH -	AUT -	AUT -	FRA -	FRA -	TCH -	TCH -	ITA; 10	ITA; 6	UK -	UK -	NED -	NED -	BEL -	BEL -	LUX -	LUX -	SWE -	SWE -	GER -	GER -									-	0
1962	250cc	BSA	ESP; 3	ESP; 2	CH; 1	CH; 2	BEL; 2	BEL; 1	FRA; 7	FRA; 4	TCH -	TCH -	POL; 2	POL; 2	NED; 15	NED; 4	LUX; 4	LUX; 6	FIN; 8	FIN; 5	USR; 3	USR; 3	GER -	GER -	ITA; 6	ITA; 3	UK; 17	UK -	SWE; 2	SWE; 11	GDR; 2	GDR; 3	3rd	42
1962	500cc	BSA	AUT -	AUT -	FRA -	FRA -	CH -	CH -	ITA -	ITA -	TCH -	TCH -	UK -	UK -	NED -	NED -	BEL; 7	BEL; 3	LUX; 17	LUX -	SWE -	SWE -											12th	3
1963	500cc	BSA	AUT; 12	AUT; 9	CH -	CH -	DEN; 4	DEN; 5	NED; 8	NED; 10	FRA; 12	FRA; 34	ITA; 5	ITA; 3	TCH; 5	TCH; 9	USR; 4	USR; 5	UK; 3	UK; 3	BEL; 7	BEL -	LUX; 8	LUX; 5	GDR -	GDR -							5th	18
1965	500cc	BSA	AUT; 1	AUT -	CH -	CH -	FRA; 3	FRA; 5	FIN -	FIN -	SWE -	SWE -	GDR -	GDR -	TCH -	TCH; 5	URS -	URS; 5	UK; 4	UK; 5	ITA -	ITA; 4	GER -	GER -	NED -	NED -	LUX; 10	LUX; 2					7th	11
1966	500cc	BSA	CH -	CH -	AUT -	AUT -	ITA -	ITA -	DEN -	DEN -	SWE -	SWE -	FIN -	FIN -	GDR -	GDR -	TCH -	TCH -	URS -	URS -	UK; 11	UK; 11	NED -	NED -	BEL; 2	BEL; 2	LUX -	LUX -	GER -	GER -			8th	8
1967	500cc	BSA	AUT -	AUT -	ITA -	ITA -	SWE -	SWE -	TCH -	TCH -	USR -	USR -	FRA -	FRA -	GER -	GER -	UK; 15	UK; 6	BEL -	BEL -	LUX -	LUX -	CH -	CH -									20th	1
