= Sammy Miller =

British motorcycle racer

Sammy Miller MBE
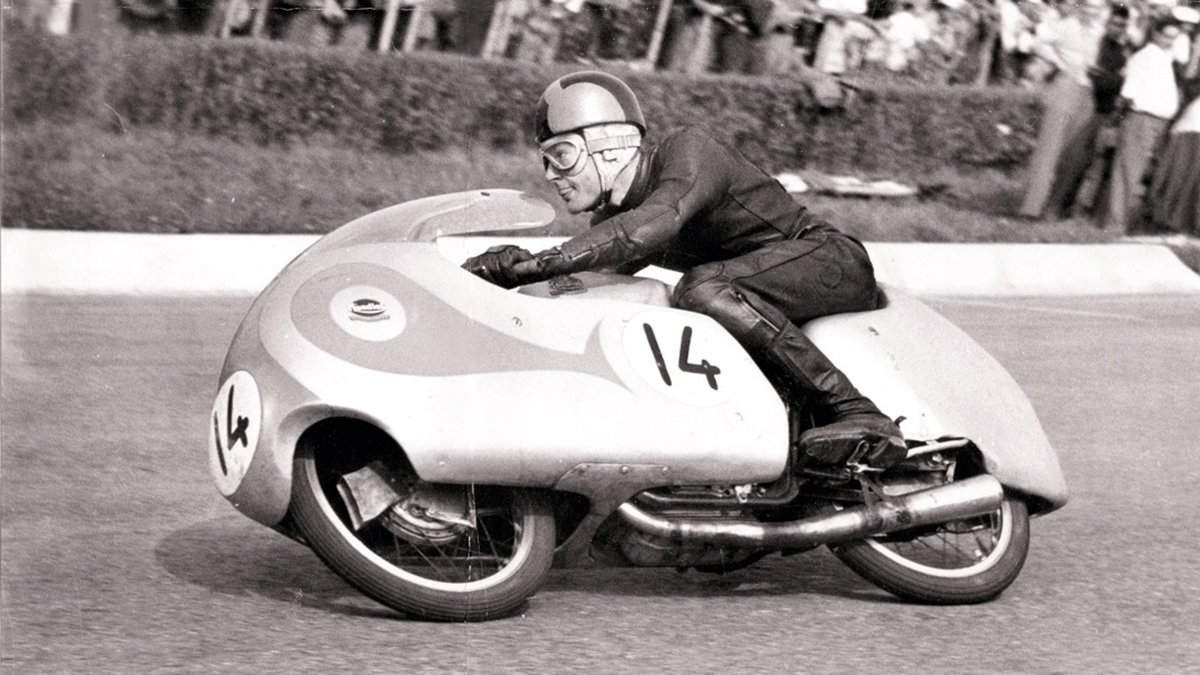
- Miller at the 1957 Nations Grand Prix in Monza
- Website: Sammy Miller
Motorcycle racing career statistics
Grand Prix motorcycle racing
| Active years | 1955 - 1958 |
| First race | 1955 250cc Ulster Grand Prix |
| Last race | 1958 Isle of Man TT 250cc Lightweight TT |
| Team(s) | NSU, Mondial, CZ, Ducati |
Starts / Wins / Podiums / Poles / F. laps / Points; 14 / 0 / 6 / 0 / 0 / 47

Samuel Hamilton Miller MBE (born 11 November 1933) is a Northern Irish championship winning motorcycle racer, in both road racing and trials. He was appointed a Member of the Order of the British Empire (MBE) in the 2009 New Year Honours for services to motorcycle heritage. In 2013, Miller was named an FIM Legend for his motorcycling achievements.

== Career ==
Miller was born in Belfast, Northern Ireland. After attending his first race at the age of 16 in 1951, he followed a career involving both road, dirt/grass track racing and observed trials. Miller became British Trials Champion 11 times and won the European Trials Championship twice. In his continuing career, Miller is a winner of over 1,300 trials, nine gold medals and the International Six Days Trial, as well as coming third in the 1957 250cc Grand Prix in championship. In racing he rode a variety of machines including AJS 7R, Mondial and NSU. Miller has won three 250cc North West 200 events (1956-1958).

Miller rode mainly Ariel Motorcycles, including both trials events and the Isle of Man TT races. When Ariel were absorbed by BSA in 1964, he formed a partnership with a Spanish firm, Bultaco, and went on to become the lead developer of modern two-stroke trials motorcycles. The bike he created was the Sherpa T. This was done in 12 days, realizing his success when he finally cleaned a section on the Sherpa that was uncleanable on his famous Ariel. In his later professional racing career, Miller was involved with Honda.

Miller is best known for the 500cc Ariel HT5 that he lightened considerably from standard ex-factory condition. The bike was famously known by its UK registration mark, GOV 132. It is now an exhibit in the Sammy Miller Museum (see below).

Miller parted from Ariel at the end of 1964, moving to Bultaco motorcycles, then newly imported by the Rickman brothers, a press photo-call with Ariel executive Ken Whistance and competition manager Ernie Smith ending his seven years of association.

During the 1960s, Miller won the Scott Trial six times, twice on an Ariel and four times on a Bultaco.

Miller set up his own motorcycle parts business in 1964 in New Milton, Hampshire, and put a few of his old racing motorcycles in the corner, later to become the Sammy Miller Motorcycle Museum. As of 2004, the museum had a collection of hundreds of bikes. In 2007 he was inducted into the AMA Motorcycle Hall of Fame. He sold his parts business as Sammy Miller Products in 2007.

Today, Miller still rides in demonstration events.

== Support for charity ==
Miller is a patron of the National Association for Bikers with a Disability.

== See also ==
- Scott Trial
