= Petteri Silván =

Finnish motorcycle racer

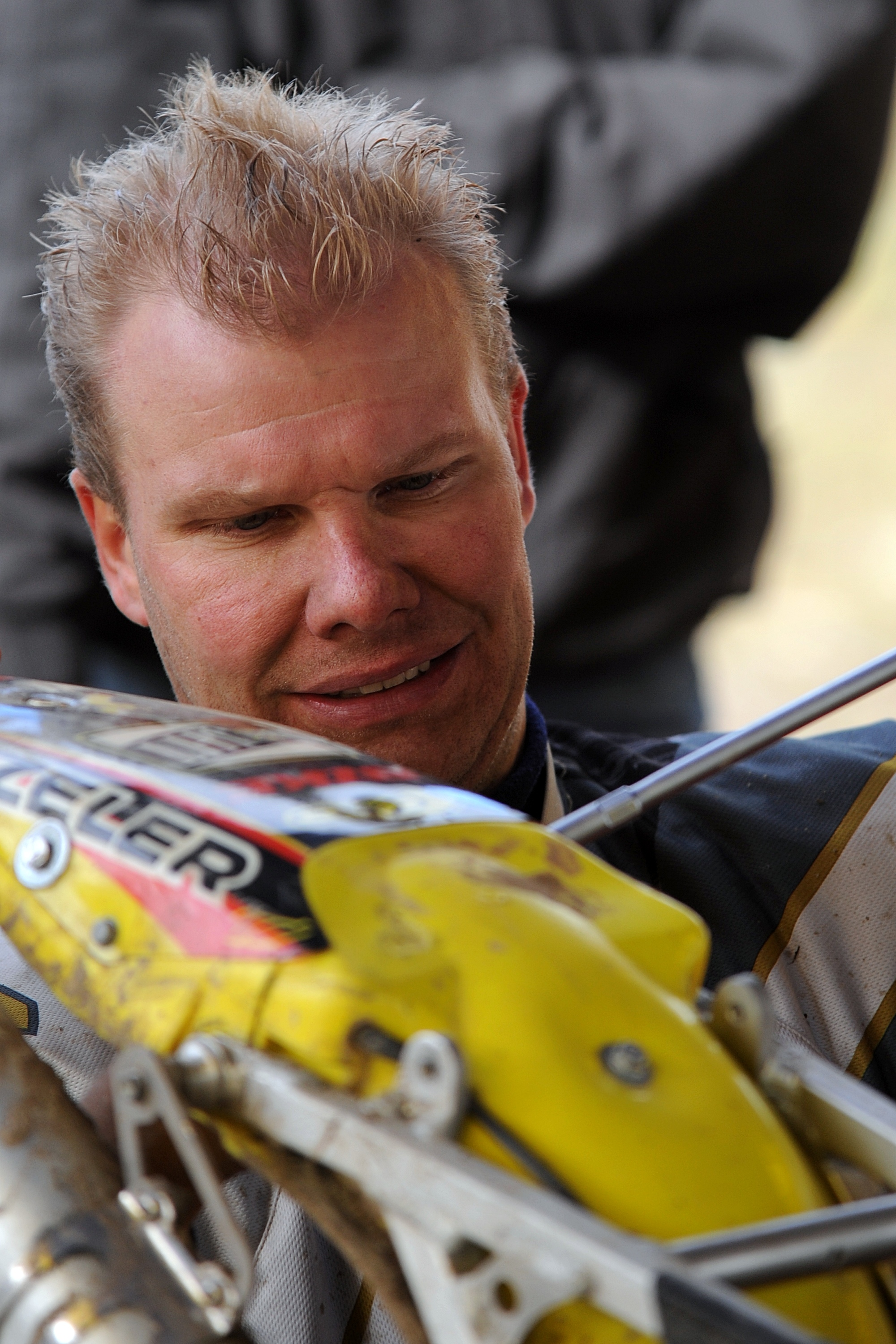
Silván at the final round of the 2010 Finnish Enduro Championship

Petteri Silván (born 21 October 1972) is a Finnish enduro rider and a five-time World Enduro Champion (including the overall world championship title in 1999). He is also a four-time winner of the International Six Days Enduro (ISDE) World Trophy with Team Finland.

Silván won the Finnish rounds of the World Enduro Championship in 1991, which earned him a factory team contract with Husqvarna for the following season. Riding in the 125 cc world championship for Husqvarna, he finished runner-up to Paul Edmondson in 1994 and then won his first world title in 1995. After an injury-filled 1996 season, Silván switched to Gas Gas and the 250 cc class, and won his second title in 1999. In 2000, he returned to Husqvarna and the smaller class, finishing second to KTM's dominant Juha Salminen who won all ten rounds of the season. In the following years, he won his third and fourth world championship titles with Husqvarna before moving to KTM. Silván retired from the World Enduro Championship after the 2005 season, and has since competed in the Finnish national championship. He was named a FIM Enduro Legend by Fédération Internationale de Motocyclisme in 2022.

== Career summary ==
Season	Series	Class	Team	Wins	Final placing
1991	World Enduro Championship	125 cc	Suzuki	2	11th
1992	World Enduro Championship	125 cc	Husqvarna	1	6th
1993	World Enduro Championship	125 cc	Husqvarna	1	8th
1994	World Enduro Championship	125 cc	Husqvarna	3	2nd
1995	World Enduro Championship	125 cc	Husqvarna	5	1st
1996	World Enduro Championship	125 cc	Husqvarna	3	5th
1997	World Enduro Championship	250 cc	Gas Gas	2	3rd
1998	World Enduro Championship	250 cc	Gas Gas	2	6th
1999	World Enduro Championship	250 cc	Gas Gas	5	1st
2000	World Enduro Championship	125 cc	Husqvarna	0	2nd
2001	World Enduro Championship	125 cc	Husqvarna	7	1st
2002	World Enduro Championship	125 cc	Husqvarna	5	1st
2003	World Enduro Championship	125 cc	KTM	4	2nd
2004	World Enduro Championship	E1	KTM	2	4th
2005	World Enduro Championship	E1	KTM	2	8th
2006	Finnish Enduro Championship	175 cc	KTM	2	2nd
2007	Finnish Enduro Championship	4-stroke	Suzuki	1	2nd
2008	Finnish Enduro Championship	250 cc	Suzuki	3	1st

=== ISDE ===
Season	Class	Team	Final placing
1992	Junior Trophy	Finland	8th
1994	World Trophy	Finland	5th
1995	World Trophy	Finland	3rd
1996	World Trophy	Finland	1st
1997	World Trophy	Finland	2nd
1998	World Trophy	Finland	1st
2000	World Trophy	Finland	18th
2001	World Trophy	Finland	16th
2002	World Trophy	Finland	1st
2004	World Trophy	Finland	1st
2005	World Trophy	Finland	2nd
