= Antoine Méo =

French motorcycle racer

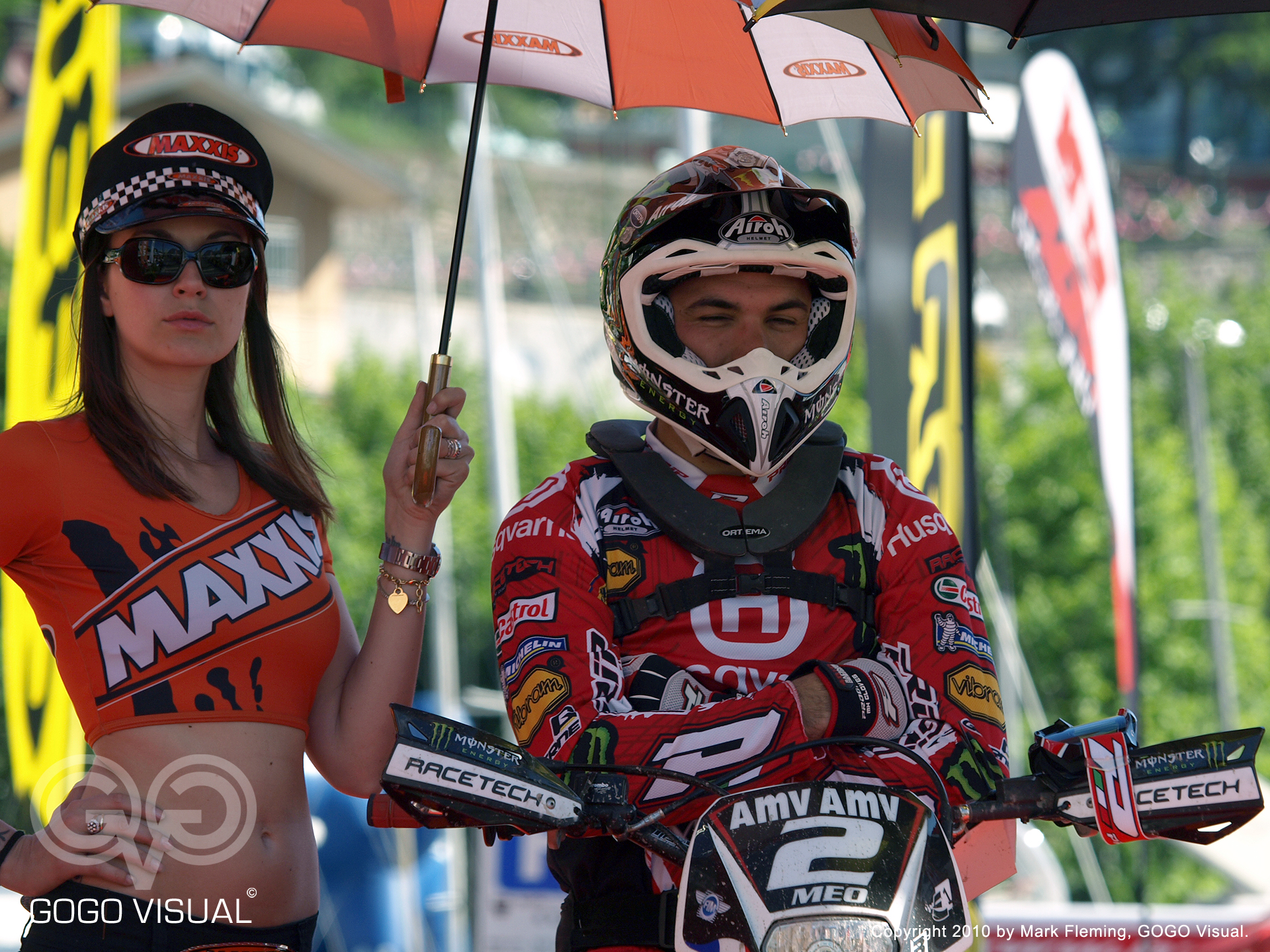
Méo at the 2010 WEC GP of Italy

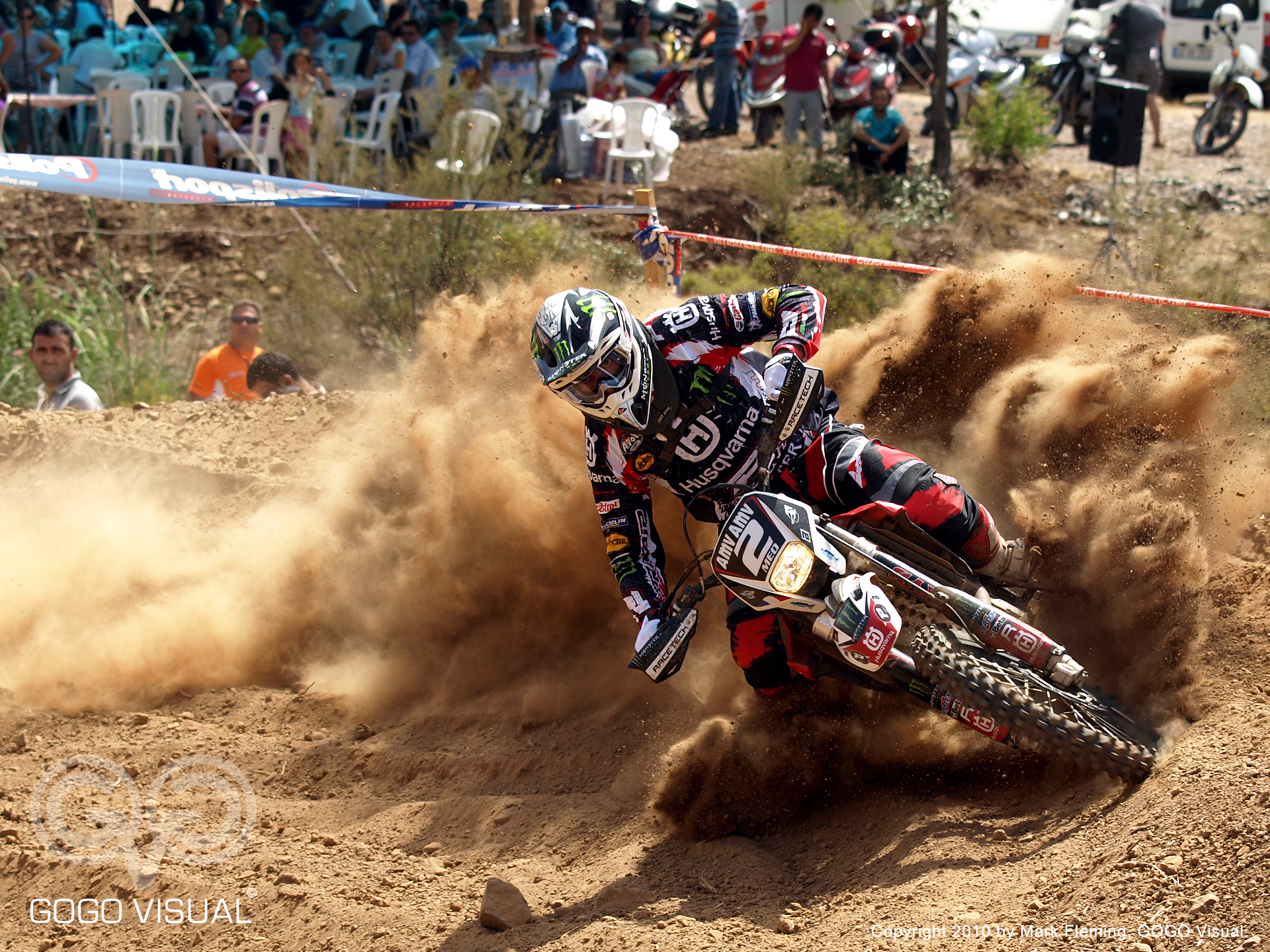
Méo at the 2010 WEC GP of Turkey

Antoine Méo (born 29 August 1984) is a French enduro rider and five-time world champion from 2010 to 2013 and 2015.

== Career ==
A former motocross rider, Méo debuted in the World Enduro Championship in 2008 with Husqvarna, where he placed fifth. In the following year, Méo finished second to Mika Ahola in the E1 category. Continuing with Husqvarna, he won the world title in 2010 ahead of countryman Johnny Aubert. For the 2011 season, Méo moved to the E2 class and claimed his second title. He returned to the E1 class, winning the 2012 and 2013 titles with KTM.

In 2009 and 2010, Méo won the International Six Days Enduro (ISDE) World Trophy with the French national team.

Méo also won the Italian round of the 2007/08 FIM Indoor Enduro World Cup. In 2009/10 he got a second-place finish at the first race in Great Britain.

Méo competed in the 2016 Dakar Rally, a rally raid competition which takes place annually in South America, riding for the factory Red Bull KTM team. In his first attempt he won the 11th stage and finished seventh overall. He returned in 2018, again winning a stage and improving to fourth overall.

== Career summary ==
Season	Series	Class	Team	Wins	Final placing
2002	European Supercross Championship	125 cc	Kawasaki	?	1st
2003	French Motocross Championship	250 cc	Kawasaki	?	2nd
2004	Motocross World Championship	MX1	Kawasaki	0	15th
2005	Motocross World Championship	MX1	Husqvarna	0	20th
2008	World Enduro Championship	E2	Husqvarna	0	5th
2009	World Enduro Championship	E1	Husqvarna	6	2nd
2010	World Enduro Championship	E1	Husqvarna	8	1st
2011	World Enduro Championship	E2	Husqvarna	8	1st
2012	World Enduro Championship	E1	KTM	12	1st
2013	World Enduro Championship	E1	KTM	12	1st
2014	World Enduro Championship	E2	KTM	4	6th
2015	World Enduro Championship	E2	KTM	8	1st

=== ISDE ===
Season	Location	Class	Team	Final placing
2009	Figueira da Foz, Portugal	World Trophy	France	1st
2010	Morelia, Mexico	World Trophy	France	1st
2012	Sachsenring, Germany	World Trophy	France	1st
2013	Olbia, Italy	World Trophy	France	1st

=== Dakar Rally ===
Year	Class	Vehicle	Position	Stages won
2016	Motorbike	KTM	7th	2
2018	Motorbike	KTM	4th	2

=== Erzberg Rodeo ===
Season	Location	Class	Team	Bike	Final placing
2023	Eisenerz, Austria	Twin Cylinder	Ducati	DesertX	1st
