= Stefan Merriman =

Australian motorcycle racer

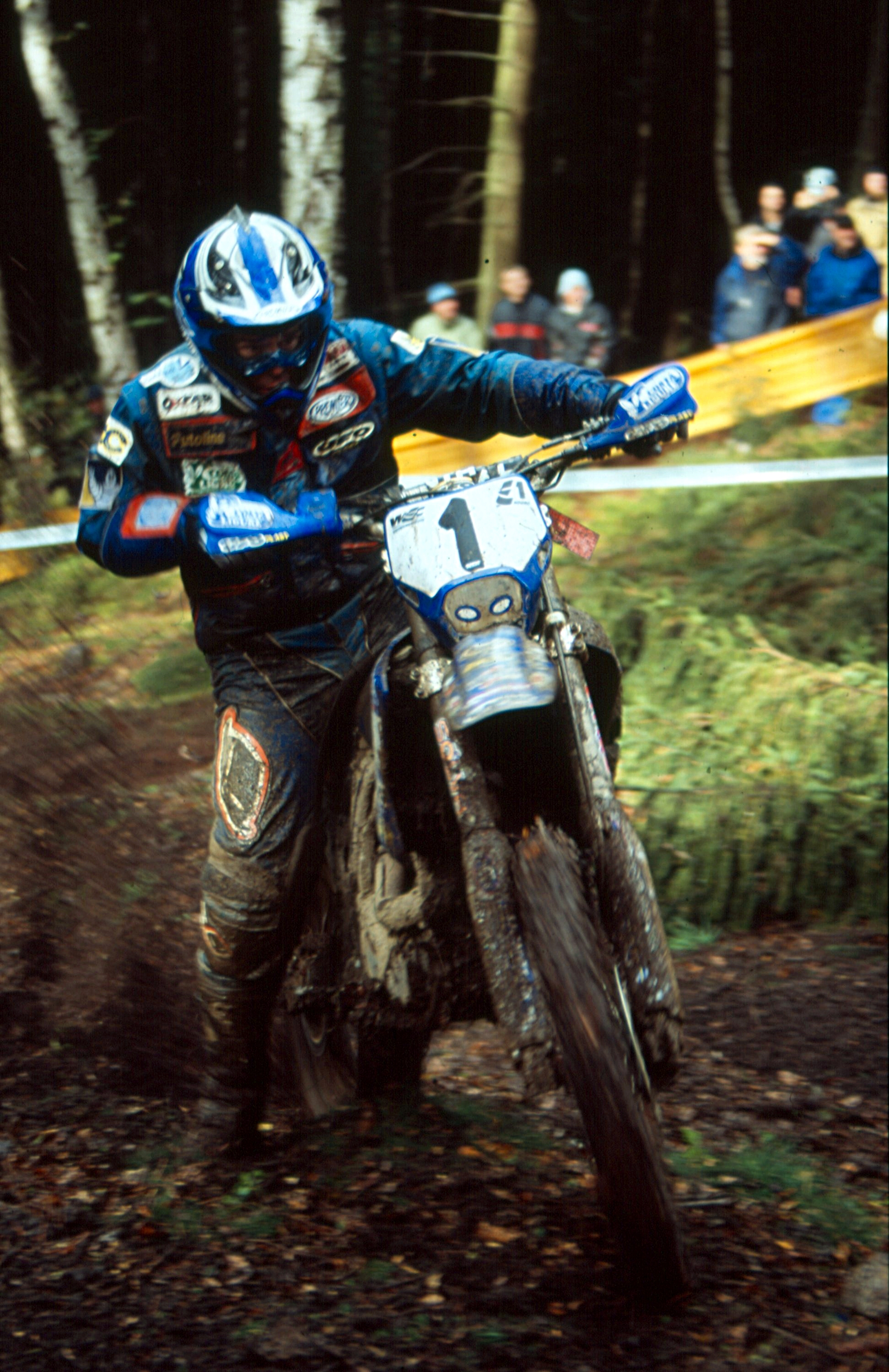
- Merriman at the German round of the 2004 World Enduro Championship
- Nationality: New Zealand
- Born: Stefan William Merriman; 24 March 1973 (age 53); Tauranga, New Zealand

Stefan William Merriman (born 24 March 1973 in Tauranga, New Zealand) is a former professional motorcycle trials and enduro rider. He won the World Enduro Championship in 2000 (250cc), 2001 (400cc), 2003 (250cc), and 2004 (Enduro 1).

== Career ==
Merriman began riding trials at an early age. In 1985 when he was 12 years old and competing against adult riders, he won the clubman class at the New Zealand Trials Championship riding a Fantic 80. Two years later when he was 14, he won the New Zealand Experts Championship. In August 1989, he won a two-day international youth trial at Scarborough. and while he was in England, he also finished second in the YMSA youth six days trial in Derbyshire. When he returned to New Zealand, he won the expert class at the 1989 New Zealand Trials Championship. In 1990, he moved to Yorkshire to live and in May was tenth in the Scottish Six Days Trial (SSDT) and received the award for best newcomer. The following year, he finished 15th in the SSDT and in 1992 he finished fourth. In the 1991 and 1992 SSDTs, he won best performance of the day awards. While living in England he rode in the British and World trials championships and received support from the UK Aprilia importers, Gerald Richardson and Malcolm Rathmell. He rode in 21 rounds of the World Championship from 1990 to 1992, with a best result of 16th at the Finnish round in 1991. He was also sixth in the British Championship that year. Merriman returned to New Zealand in 1992 then moved to Brisbane in 1993. Later that year, he won the Australian and the New Zealand Trials Championships. In 1994, he finished second to Graham Jarvis in the Australian Trials Championship, and he won it again in 1995. Around this time, he also competed in road racing and won the Australian Supersport 600 championship in 1995. From 1996, Merriman began competing in enduro events, riding on an Australian motorcycle competition licence when he competed in international events. He won the World Enduro Championship in the 250cc class in 2000, the 400cc in 2001, 250cc in 2003 and Enduro One in 2004. In 2003, Merriman also came close to beating Juha Salminen for the overall World title, finishing second in the overall championship only three points (266 vs. 269) behind Salminen. He led the championship before the final heat where he fell and finished second as Salminen took the win and the championship. In 2004, Merriman moved to Yamaha, winning his fourth world title and placing third overall, behind Salminen and Samuli Aro and ahead of David Knight. The following year, he won eleven of the 18 rounds in the Enduro 2 class, but with four retirements could not challenge KTM's Samuli Aro for the title. In 2006, he took three wins and placed third in the championship. Merriman signed with Aprilia to race their V-Twin machine in the 2007 World Enduro Championship, and placed fifth in the E2 championship, with one second place as his best event result. In the 2008 season, he competed in the E3 class, winning three of the last four events and again placed fifth in the standings.

== World Enduro Championship results ==
Season	Series	Class	Team	Wins	Final placing
1998	World Enduro Championship	250 cc	Husqvarna	0	4th
1999	World Enduro Championship	250 cc	Husqvarna	8	2nd
2000	World Enduro Championship	250 cc	Husqvarna	7	1st
2001	World Enduro Championship	400 cc	Husqvarna	7	1st
2002	World Enduro Championship	400 cc	Husqvarna	5	2nd
2003	World Enduro Championship	250 cc	Honda	9	1st
2004	World Enduro Championship	E1	Yamaha	13	1st
2005	World Enduro Championship	E2	Yamaha	11	2nd
2006	World Enduro Championship	E2	Yamaha	3	3rd
2007	World Enduro Championship	E2	Aprilia	0	5th
2008	World Enduro Championship	E3	Aprilia	3	5th
