= Kari Tiainen =

Finnish motorcycle racer

Kari Tapio Tiainen (born 26 August 1966 in Riihimäki) is a Finnish former professional enduro rider. He competed in the World Enduro Championships from 1989 to 2003. Tiainen is notable for being a seven-time World Enduro Champion and held the record for most wins in the world championship (77), until the record was broken by compatriot Juha Salminen during the 2008 season. In 2012, Tiainen was named an FIM Legend for his motorcycling achievements.

== Motorcycle racing career ==
Tiainen has also participated in several national championships, becoming a four-time German and two-time Finnish and Spanish champion. In addition to his personal world titles, he has won the International Six Days Enduro (ISDE) World Trophy for Finland in 1996, 1998, 1999 and 2003. He was the fastest rider in the 500 cc class in 1994, 1995, 1996, 1997 and 1999. In 1999, he also drove for Finland in the Race of Champions, alongside Tommi Mäkinen and JJ Lehto, and the team won the Nations' Cup.

Originally a motocross rider, Tiainen switched to enduro in 1989 and finished fourth in the European championship. The world championship was started the following year, and he took his first title with Suzuki in the 250 cc class. For the following year, he switched to Husqvarna and successfully defended his title. Tiainen then moved to the biggest 500 cc class, winning the title with Husqvarna in 1992, 1994, 1995 and 1997, and with KTM in 2000. From 1990 to 2000, even during the seasons that he finished runner-up, he led his class in the number of wins. The 2001 season, during which he finished third behind Anders Eriksson and Mika Ahola, was Tiainen's last full season in the world championship. After his racing career, Tiainen continued with KTM as the team principal from 2003 to 2005. In 2011, Tiainen became the team principal for Ice 1 Racing, Kimi Räikkönen's team in the Motocross World Championship.

== Career summary ==
Season	Series	Class	Team	Races	Wins	Final placing
1989	European Enduro Championship	250 cc	Suzuki	12	2	4th
1990	World Enduro Championship	250 cc	Suzuki	14	6	1st
1991	World Enduro Championship	250 cc	Husqvarna	16	8	1st
1992	World Enduro Championship	500 cc	Husqvarna	12	5	1st
1993	World Enduro Championship	500 cc	Husqvarna	14	7	2nd
1994	World Enduro Championship	500 cc	Husqvarna	12	5	1st
1995	World Enduro Championship	500 cc	Husqvarna	12	9	1st
1996	World Enduro Championship	500 cc	Husqvarna	12	6	2nd
1997	World Enduro Championship	500 cc	KTM	14	8	1st
1998	World Enduro Championship	500 cc	KTM	14	8	2nd
1999	World Enduro Championship	500 cc	KTM	14	7	2nd
2000	World Enduro Championship	500 cc	KTM	10	7	1st
2001	World Enduro Championship	500 cc	KTM	10	1	3rd
2002	World Enduro Championship	500 cc	KTM	6	0	11th
2003	World Enduro Championship	250 cc	KTM	2	0	19th

=== ISDE ===
Season	Location	Class	Team	Final placing
1989	Walldürn, Germany	Junior Trophy	Finland	1st
1990	Västerås, Sweden	World Trophy	Finland	2nd
1991	Považská Bystrica, Czechoslovakia	World Trophy	Finland	11th
1993	Assen, Netherlands	World Trophy	Finland	10th
1994	Tulsa, United States	World Trophy	Finland	5th
1995	Jelenia Góra, Poland	World Trophy	Finland	3rd
1996	Hämeenlinna, Finland	World Trophy	Finland	1st
1997	Brescia, Italy	World Trophy	Finland	2nd
1998	Traralgon, Australia	World Trophy	Finland	1st
1999	Coimbra, Portugal	World Trophy	Finland	1st
2000	Granada, Spain	World Trophy	Finland	18th
2001	Brive-la-Gaillarde, France	World Trophy	Finland	16th
2003	Fortaleza, Brazil	World Trophy	Finland	1st
2008	Serres, Greece	World Trophy	Finland	5th

Sporting positions
Preceded by Inaugural event	Race of Champions; Nations' Cup; 1999 with: JJ Lehto; Tommi Mäkinen	Succeeded by Régis Laconi; Yvan Muller; Gilles Panizzi
