= Paul Edmondson (motorcyclist) =

British motorcycle racer

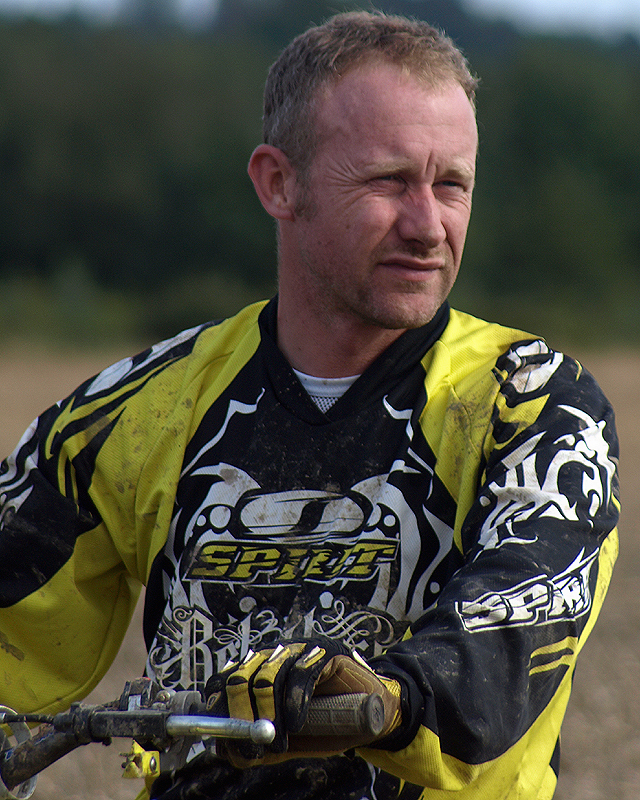
Edmondson at the 2008 GBXC.

Paul "Fast Eddy" Edmondson (born 17 July 1969) is a British former professional motorcycle enduro racer and a four-time World Enduro Champion. He is also a long-time member of the British team in the International Six Days Enduro (ISDE), was the fastest racer in the 125 cc class in 1989, 1990, 1991 and 1994 and holds the ISDE record for gold medals, taking his total to 16 in 2009's Portugal ISDE.

Edmondson took the 125 cc European championship title with KTM in 1989, and repeated his success when the world championship was started the following year. He won his second world title with Husqvarna in 1993, and then switched to Gas Gas, winning the 125 cc world championship in 1994 and the 250 cc in 1996. After competing in the United States for some years, Edmondson returned to the World Enduro Championship and finished runner-up to Peter Bergvall in the 250 cc 4-stroke class in 2002, and to Juha Salminen in the E2 class in 2004. After retiring from the series, he has continued racing in the British national championship (BEC), where he has won several titles. In the 2008 season, Edmondson returned to the WEC for the GP of Wales and finished fourth in both rounds.

Edmondson was one of the stunt double of Daniel Craig in No Time to Die performing the motorcycle action.

== Career summary ==
| Season | Series | Class | Team | Wins | Final placing |
|---|---|---|---|---|---|
| 1989 | European Enduro Championship | 125 cc | KTM | ? | 1st |
| 1990 | World Enduro Championship | 125 cc | KTM | 8 | 1st |
| 1991 | World Enduro Championship | 125 cc | Husqvarna | 5 | 2nd |
| 1992 | World Enduro Championship | 125 cc | Husqvarna | 3 | 3rd |
| 1993 | World Enduro Championship | 125 cc | Husqvarna | 3 | 1st |
| 1994 | World Enduro Championship | 125 cc | Gas Gas | 3 | 1st |
| 1995 | World Enduro Championship | 250 cc | Gas Gas | 0 | 4th |
| 1996 | World Enduro Championship | 250 cc | Gas Gas | 5 | 1st |
| 1998 | Grand National Cross Country | Bikes | Suzuki | ? | 10th |
| 1999 | Grand National Cross Country | Bikes | Suzuki | ? | 5th |
| 2000 | Grand National Cross Country | Bikes | Kawasaki | ? | 2nd |
| 2002 | World Enduro Championship | 250 cc | Husqvarna | 1 | 2nd |
| 2003 | World Enduro Championship | 125 cc | Yamaha | 1 | 6th |
| 2004 | World Enduro Championship | E2 | Honda | 2 | 2nd |
| 2005 | World Enduro Championship | E1 | Honda | 0 | 6th |
| 2006 | World Enduro Championship | E2 | Honda | 0 | 13th |
| 2007 | British Enduro Championship | Overall | Suzuki | 2 | 2nd |
| 2008 | British Enduro Championship | Overall | Suzuki | 1 | 2nd |

Paul Edmondson did has last race on Saturday 29 September 2012 for the ACU British ISDE Team.
