= Anders Eriksson (enduro rider) =

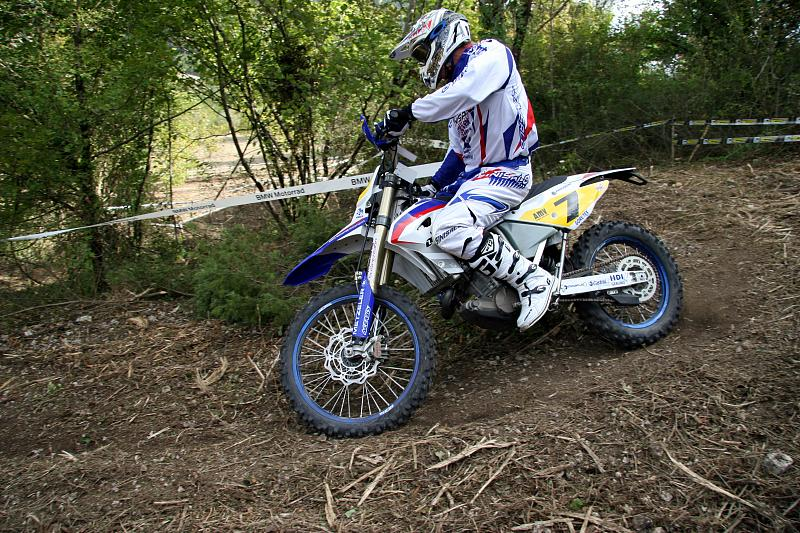
Eriksson with a BMW at the 2008 WEC Grand Prix of Italy.

Anders Eriksson (born 14 May 1973) is a Swedish enduro rider and a seven-time World Enduro Champion. He debuted in the World Enduro Championship with Kawasaki in 1991, and took his first world title with Husaberg in the 350 cc class in 1995. He then moved to Husqvarna for the 1996 season, and won the 400 cc world championship. In 2010, Eriksson was named an FIM Legend for his motorcycling achievements.

Debuting in the 500 cc category, Eriksson finished second to Kari Tiainen, and then beat him to the title in 1998 and 1999, despite not matching the Finn's win totals. After a third place in 2000, Eriksson edged Mika Ahola by one point to take his fifth world title in 2001. After winning the 500 cc world championship for the fourth time in 2002, he moved to the smaller 450 cc class for the 2003 season and became a seven-time world champion, equalling Tiainen's record. Eriksson continued with Husqvarna until the 2008 season, when he signed to the BMW team with a contract that runs through 2010.

== Career summary ==
Season	Series	Class	Team	Wins	Final placing
1991	World Enduro Championship	125 cc	Kawasaki	0	12th
1992	European Enduro Championship	125 cc	Kawasaki	?	2nd
1993	World Enduro Championship	350 cc	Husaberg	3	2nd
1994	World Enduro Championship	350 cc	Husaberg	1	4th
1995	World Enduro Championship	350 cc	Husaberg	5	1st
1996	World Enduro Championship	400 cc	Husqvarna	5	1st
1997	World Enduro Championship	500 cc	Husqvarna	5	2nd
1998	World Enduro Championship	500 cc	Husqvarna	6	1st
1999	World Enduro Championship	500 cc	Husqvarna	3	1st
2000	World Enduro Championship	500 cc	Husqvarna	1	3rd
2001	World Enduro Championship	500 cc	Husqvarna	2	1st
2002	World Enduro Championship	500 cc	Husqvarna	7	1st
2003	World Enduro Championship	450 cc	Husqvarna	4	1st
2004	World Enduro Championship	E3	Husqvarna	0	5th
2005	World Enduro Championship	E2	Husqvarna	0	7th
2006	World Enduro Championship	E3	Husqvarna	0	20th
2007	World Enduro Championship	E3	Husqvarna	0	7th
2008	World Enduro Championship	E3	BMW	0	10th

=== ISDE ===
Season	Location	Class	Team	Final placing
1992	Cessnock, Australia	Junior Trophy	Sweden	1st
1993	Assen, Netherlands	World Trophy	Sweden	19th
1994	Tulsa, United States	World Trophy	Sweden	2nd
1995	Jelenia Góra, Poland	World Trophy	Sweden	15th
1996	Hämeenlinna, Finland	World Trophy	Sweden	7th
1997	Brescia, Italy	World Trophy	Sweden	16th
1998	Traralgon, Australia	World Trophy	Sweden	2nd
1999	Coimbra, Portugal	World Trophy	Sweden	13th
2000	Granada, Spain	World Trophy	Sweden	2nd
2001	Brive-la-Gaillarde, France	World Trophy	Sweden	8th
2002	Jablonec nad Nisou, Czech Republic	World Trophy	Sweden	2nd
2003	Fortaleza, Brazil	World Trophy	Sweden	17th
2004	Kielce, Poland	World Trophy	Sweden	4th
