= World Endurance Championship =

World Endurance Championship may refer to:

- FIA World Endurance Championship, an auto racing series held since 2012
- World Sportscar Championship, an auto racing series which used the title World Endurance Championship from 1981 to 1985
- Endurance FIM World Championship, a motorcycle racing series since 1975
- World Enduro Championship, an off-road motorcycle racing series since 1990
