= David Knight (motorcyclist) =

Enduro rider from the Isle of Man

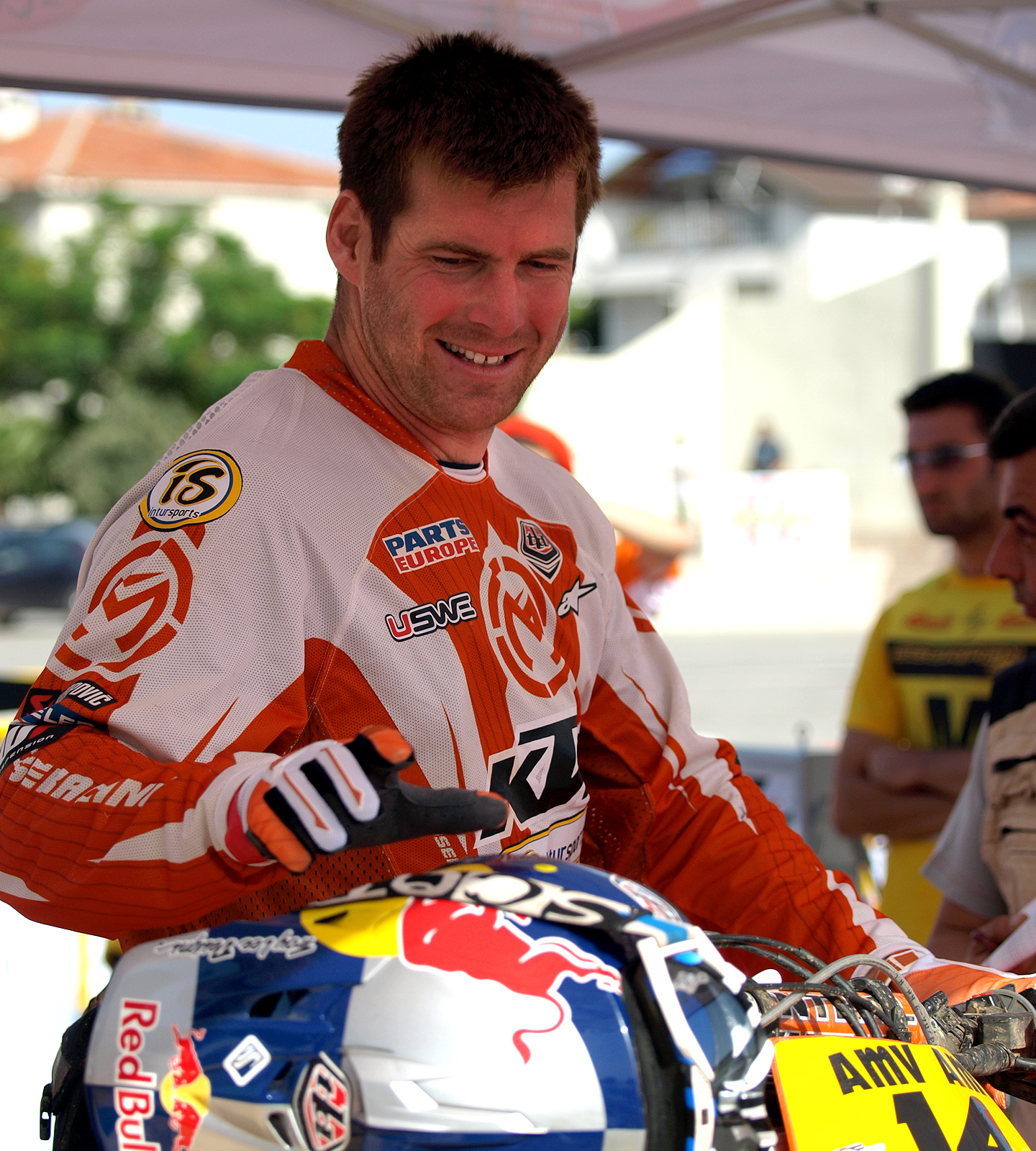
Knight at the 2010 WEC GP of Turkey.

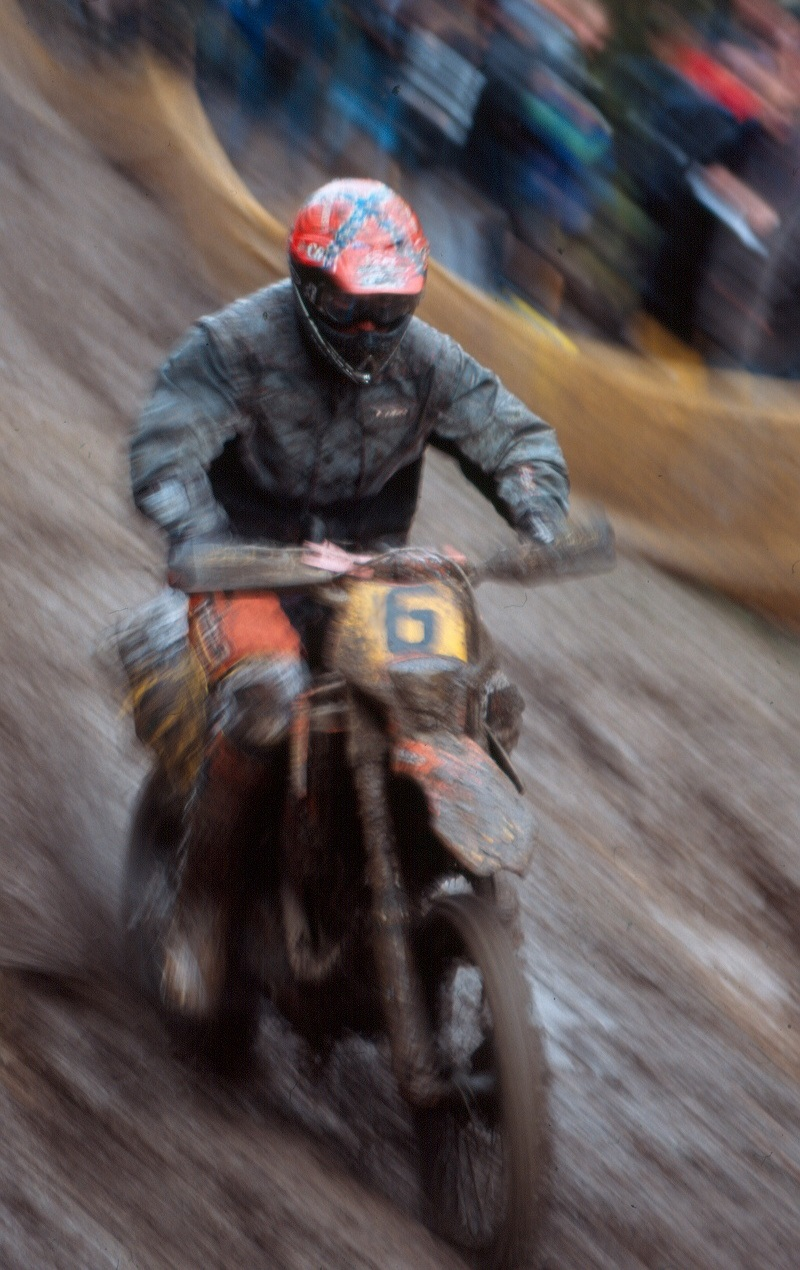
Knight on a KTM at the German round of the 2004 WEC season.

David "Knighter" Knight, MBE (born 31 May 1978), is a Manx three-time world champion enduro rider from the Isle of Man. He holds five world titles altogether.

== Early life ==
Knight is from the north side village of Ballaugh.

== Career ==
After competing in the Enduro FIM Junior Cup, Knight debuted in the World Enduro Championship riding for Yamaha. He finished runner-up in the 250 cc class to Juha Salminen in 2001 and to Samuli Aro in 2002. In 2003, he moved to the biggest 500 cc class and placed fourth.

For the 2004 season, Knight moved to the KTM team and finished second to his teammate Aro in the Enduro 3 class. In 2005, continuing in the E3 class, he took his first world title and also won the International Six Days Enduro outright. In 2006, he posted a "perfect" season, winning all 14 rounds of the E3 WEC season, also winning almost every special test at each event.

For 2007, Knight moved to the United States to take on the Grand National Cross Country (GNCC) series against the best in the US. He replaced Salminen, who in turn moved back to the world championship from the KTM USA team. Despite some mechanical difficulties and an injury, Knight still managed to take the GNCC title. After defending his title in the following season, he moved back to the World Enduro Championship. He won his third world title in 2010.

Knight also competes in a wide range of "extreme" enduro events, such as the Hells Gate extreme enduro in Italy, the Erzberg Rodeo in Austria, the AMA EnduroCross Championship in Las Vegas, Nevada and the "Tough One" in the UK (he has won all of these, even beating Salminen), and won (leading every lap of) the first and second annual Red Bull Last Man Standing events in Texas.

Knight won two races at the inaugural 2007/08 FIM Indoor Enduro World Cup, beating Taddy Blazusiak to claim the title. In 2009/10, he collected a win and three podiums. The rider got two wins and three podiums in 2012/13, resulting runner-up behind Blazusiak. He has won three editions of the Barcelona Indoor Enduro in 2003, 2006 and 2007, and resulted second six times in 2001, 2002, 2004, 2010, 2011 and 2013.

Knight is an accomplished all rounder, having won the British Expert trials championship, as well as competing with success in various motocross and beach racing events, including winning the Weston Beach Race six times. His all rounder status was confirmed by his winning of the "Moto 1" event in the UK, which got riders from several disciplines of motorcycle sport to compete against each other in several disciplines (including road racing, MX, enduro, trials, etc.).

Knight received an MBE, June 2011, in the Queens Birthday Honours list.

== Career summary ==
Season	Series	Class	Team	Wins	Final placing
1998	Enduro FIM Junior Cup	250 cc	Yamaha	2	12th
1999	Enduro FIM Junior Cup	250 cc	Yamaha	1	10th
2000	Enduro FIM Junior Cup	250 cc	Yamaha	5	2nd
2001	World Enduro Championship	250 cc	Yamaha	0	2nd
2002	World Enduro Championship	250 cc	Yamaha	2	2nd
2003	World Enduro Championship	500 cc	Yamaha	0	4th
2004	World Enduro Championship	E3	KTM	2	2nd
2005	World Enduro Championship	E3	KTM	17	1st
2006	World Enduro Championship	E3	KTM	14	1st
2007	Grand National Cross Country	Bikes	KTM	8	1st
2008	Grand National Cross Country	Bikes	KTM	7	1st
2009	World Enduro Championship	E3	BMW	0	14th
2010	World Enduro Championship	E3	KTM	8	1st
2011	World Enduro Championship	E3	KTM	1	18th
