= Iván Cervantes =

Spanish motorcycle racer (born 1982)

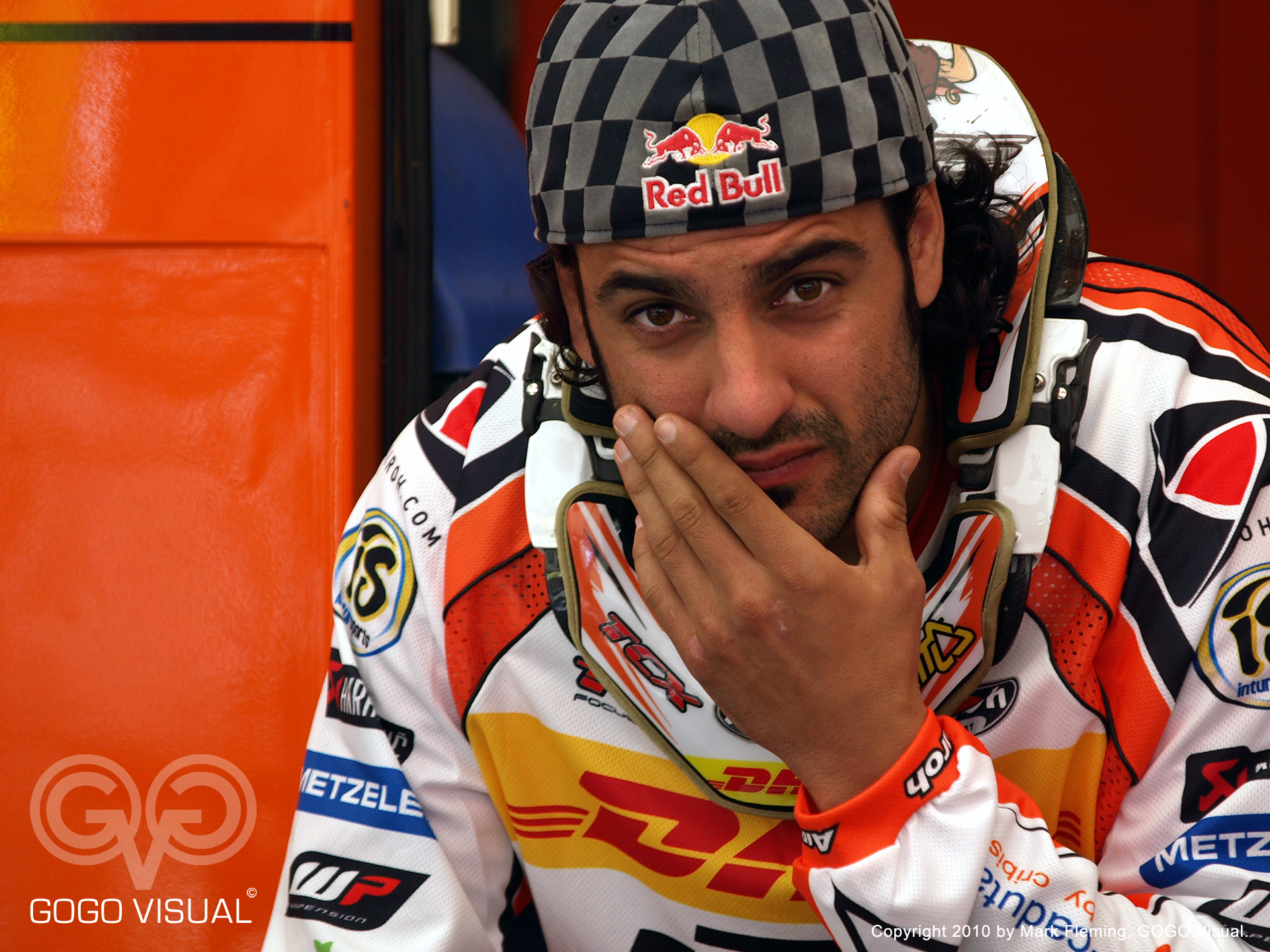
Cervantes at the 2010 WEC GP of Italy.

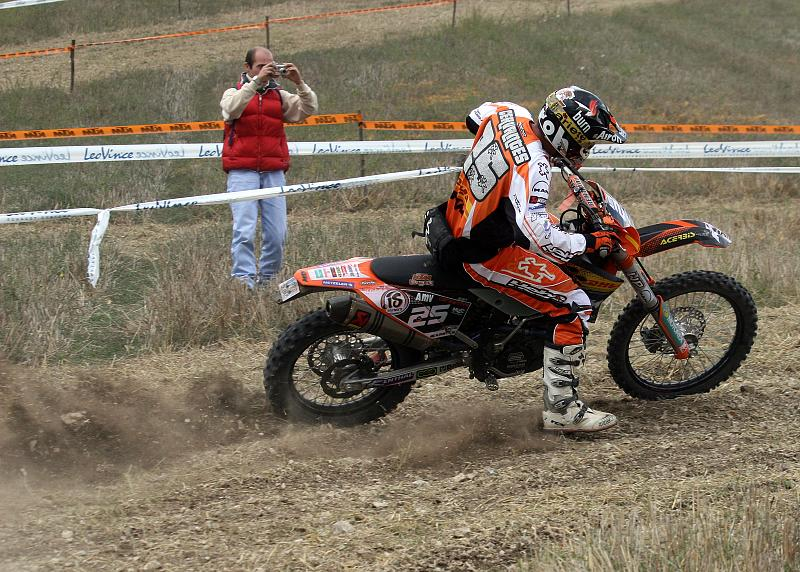
Cervantes at the 2008 WEC GP of Italy.

Iván Cervantes Montero (born 2 May 1982) is a Spanish motorcycle enduro racer from Cambrils (Tarragona) and a four-times world enduro champion.

== Career ==
Cervantes started out as a motocross rider, a discipline in which he holds five Spanish national titles, before moving on to enduro racing. In 2005, at the age of 23, he made motorcycle racing history by becoming the first Spanish enduro world champion in category E1 enduro (100 to 125 cc two-stroke or 175 - 250 cc four-stroke). In 2006, he successfully defended his title. The following year, he won the world championship in the E3 category (290 to 500 cc two-stroke or 475 - 650 cc four-stroke). In the 2008 season, continuing with KTM, he finished second to Honda's Mika Ahola.

Cervantes also won the 2008/09 FIM Indoor Enduro World Cup, winning five races. In 2009/10, he was runner-up with one win and six second-place finishes. He returned for the 2011/12 season, resulting in fifth with two podiums.

In 2011, Cervantes changed bike to GasGas.

In various press interviews, Cervantes has stated that his goal is to win two world titles in each of the three enduro categories, and then to try to win the Dakar Rally.

On 19 July 2021, Cervantes announced his brand-new partnership (along with Ricky Carmichael) with Triumph Motorcycles. They will act as brand ambassadors for the new line of off-road motorcycles being developed by Triumph for use in motocross/supercross racing.

On 9 June 2023, Iván Cervantes rode a Triumph Tiger Explorer 1200 GT the distance of 4,012.53 km (2,493.28 mi) in 24 hours at Nardò Ring to claim the record for ‘The greatest distance on a motorcycle in 24 hours (individual)’.

== Career summary ==
Season	Series:	Class	Team	Wins	Final placing
2002	World Enduro Championship	500 cc	KTM	0	12th
2003	World Enduro Championship	500 cc	KTM	2	2nd
2004	World Enduro Championship	E3	KTM	3	3rd
2005	World Enduro Championship	E1	KTM	14	1st
2006	World Enduro Championship	E1	KTM	9	1st
2007	World Enduro Championship	E3	KTM	11	1st
2008	World Enduro Championship	E1	KTM	5	2nd
2009	World Enduro Championship	E3	KTM	10	1st
2010	World Enduro Championship	E2	KTM	4	2nd
2011	World Enduro Championship	E2	Gas Gas	0	3rd
