= Mario Rinaldi =

Italian motorcycle racer (born 1966)

Mario Rinaldi (born 17 March 1966) is an Italian enduro rider and a four-time World Enduro Champion. He is also a four-time winner of the International Six Days Enduro (ISDE) World Trophy with Team Italy. Rinaldi won all his world championship titles with KTM; in 1992 and 1994 in the 350 cc class, and in 1997 and 2000 in the 400 cc class. He subsequently competed for Yamaha and Husaberg until retiring from the World Enduro Championship, and concentrating on the Italian national championship.

== Career summary ==
Season	Series	Class	Team	Wins	Final placing
1991	World Enduro Championship	350 cc	KTM	1	2nd
1992	World Enduro Championship	350 cc	KTM	3	1st
1993	World Enduro Championship	350 cc	KTM	1	4th
1994	World Enduro Championship	350 cc	KTM	6	1st
1995	World Enduro Championship	350 cc	KTM	4	2nd
1996	World Enduro Championship	400 cc	KTM	5	2nd
1997	World Enduro Championship	400 cc	KTM	8	1st
1998	World Enduro Championship	400 cc	KTM	1	3rd
1999	World Enduro Championship	400 cc	KTM	6	2nd
2000	World Enduro Championship	400 cc	KTM	4	1st
2001	World Enduro Championship	400 cc	Yamaha	3	2nd
2002	World Enduro Championship	500 cc	Yamaha	0	6th
2003	World Enduro Championship	450 cc	Yamaha	0	10th
2004	World Enduro Championship	E1	Yamaha	0	7th
2005	World Enduro Championship	E3	Husaberg	0	10th

=== ISDE ===
Season	Location	Class	Team	Final placing
1991	Považská Bystrica, Czechoslovakia	World Trophy	Italy	14th
1992	Cessnock, Australia	World Trophy	Italy	1st
1994	Tulsa, United States	World Trophy	Italy	1st
1996	Hämeenlinna, Finland	World Trophy	Italy	2nd
1997	Brescia, Italy	World Trophy	Italy	1st
1998	Traralgon, Australia	World Trophy	Italy	4th
1999	Coimbra, Portugal	World Trophy	Italy	2nd
2000	Granada, Spain	World Trophy	Italy	1st
2001	Brive-la-Gaillarde, France	World Trophy	Italy	2nd
2003	Fortaleza, Brazil	World Trophy	Italy	2nd
2004	Kielce, Poland	World Trophy	Italy	2nd
