= Triumph Tiger Explorer =

British motorcycle

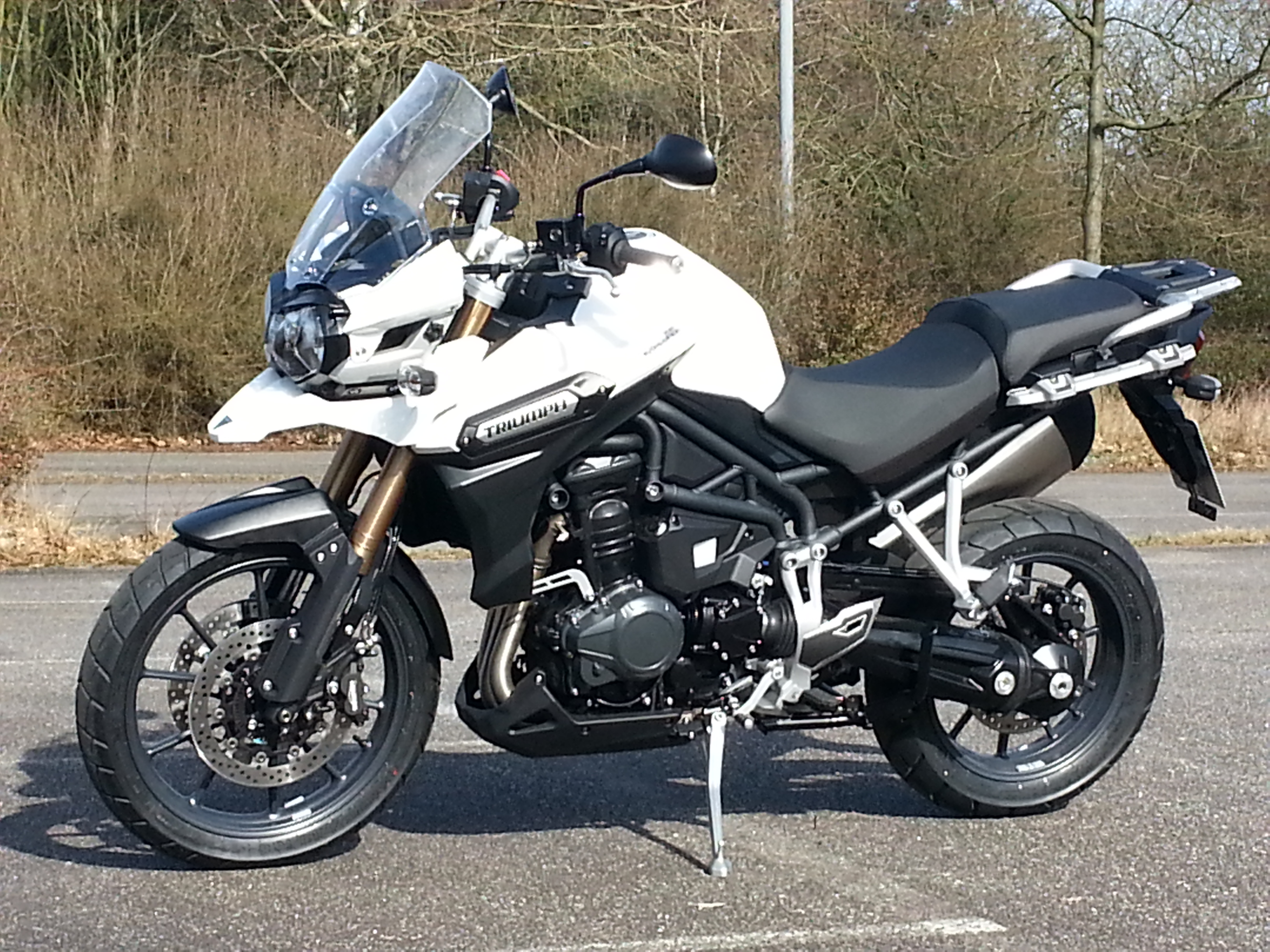
- Manufacturer: Triumph
- Production: 2012
- Engine: 1,215 cc (74.1 cu in); 1,160 cc (71 cu in) (2022), liquid-cooled, 12 valve, DOHC, straight-three
- Bore / stroke: 85 mm × 71.4 mm (3.35 in × 2.81 in); 90 mm × 60.7 mm (3.54 in × 2.39 in) (2022)
- Power: 139 bhp (104 kW) @ 9,350 rpm 147 bhp (110 kW) @ 9,000 rpm (2022)
- Torque: 122 N⋅m (90 lb⋅ft) @ 7,600 rpm 130 N⋅m (96 lb⋅ft) @ 7,000 rpm (2022)
- Transmission: 6-speed gearbox, shaft drive
- Brakes: Front: Dual 305 mm discs and Nissin 4-piston callipers Rear: Single 282 mm disc and 2-piston calliper Switchable ABS
- Tyres: Front: 110/80R19; Rear: 150/70R17
- Rake, trail: 23.9°/ 105.5 mm (4.15 in)
- Wheelbase: 1,520 mm (60 in)
- Dimensions: L: 2,248 mm (88.5 in); W: 885 mm (34.8 in); H: 1,410 mm (56 in)
- Seat height: 835–855 mm (32.87–33.66 in); Low seat version: 790–810 mm (31.10–31.89 in)
- Weight: XR: 242 kg (534 lb); XRx: 244 kg (538 lb) (dry)
- Fuel capacity: 20 L (4.4 imp gal; 5.3 US gal)
- Oil capacity: 4 L (4.2 US qt)

The Triumph Tiger Explorer (marketed as Triumph Tiger 1200 since November 2017) is a dual-sport motorcycle that was announced by British company Triumph Motorcycles at the EICMA show in November 2011. There are currently two model series available; the Tiger 1200 GT and Tiger 1200 Rally. Both models have similar specifications, but the Rally series comes with a set-up that is geared toward off-road riding with spoked wheels instead of the aluminium cast wheels found on the GT series. They are both powered by a 1,215 cc (74.1 cu in) straight-three engine with four valves per cylinder and a six-speed gearbox with shaft final drive.

On 9 June 2023, Iván Cervantes rode a 2023 Triumph Tiger Explorer 1200 GT 4,012.53 km (2,493.28 mi) in 24 hours at Nardò Ring to claim the record for 'The greatest distance on a motorcycle in 24 hours (individual)'.
