= FIM Enduro World Championship =

World championship series for enduro

FIM World Enduro Championship
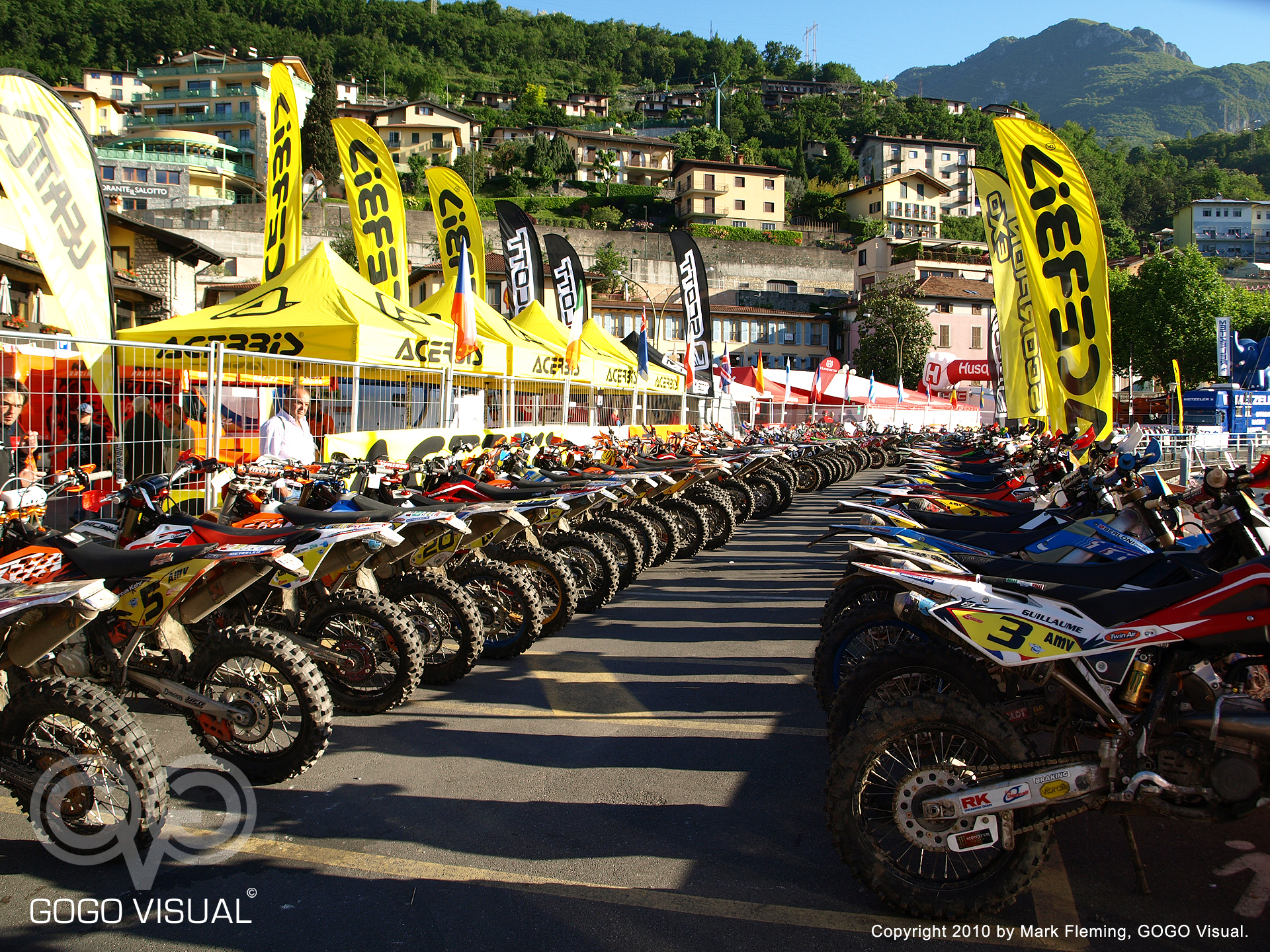
- Motorcycles lined up in Italy
- Category: Motorcycle racing
- Region: International
- Inaugural season: 1990
- Official website: endurogp.com

The FIM Enduro World Championship, formerly known as the World Enduro Championship, is the world championship series for enduro, a popular form of off-road motorcycle sport. The championship currently features three classes (E1, E2 and E3), along with separate categories for junior and female riders. The championship was first organized in 1990, and currently consists of 16 races based on eight two-day events. All rounds include an enduro test, a motocross test and an extreme test.

== History ==
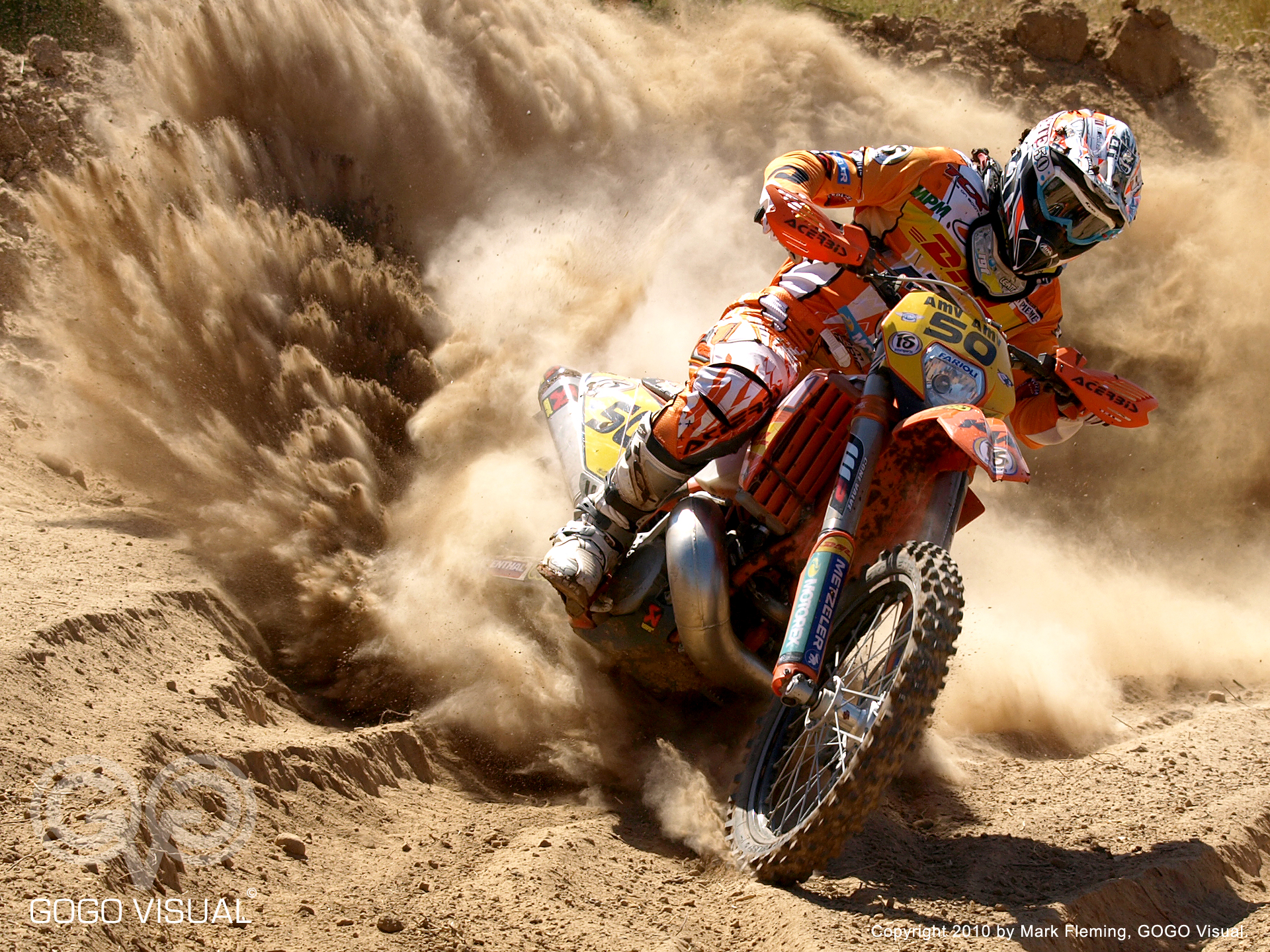
Simone Albergoni at the GP of Turkey

The World Enduro Championship began in 1990, replacing the FIM European Enduro Championship, which had been contested since 1968. The European championship was later restarted by the Union Européenne de Motocyclisme (UEM) in 1993. The WEC had six classes from 1990 to 1993, after which the 80 cc and 500 cc 2-stroke championships were discontinued. The series continued with four classes, 125, 250, 350 and 500 cc, until the 1998 season, which saw 250 cc 4-stroke as a new class and the 350 cc replaced by 400 cc. In 1998, all rounds also counted towards an overall championship, which was continued until 2004.

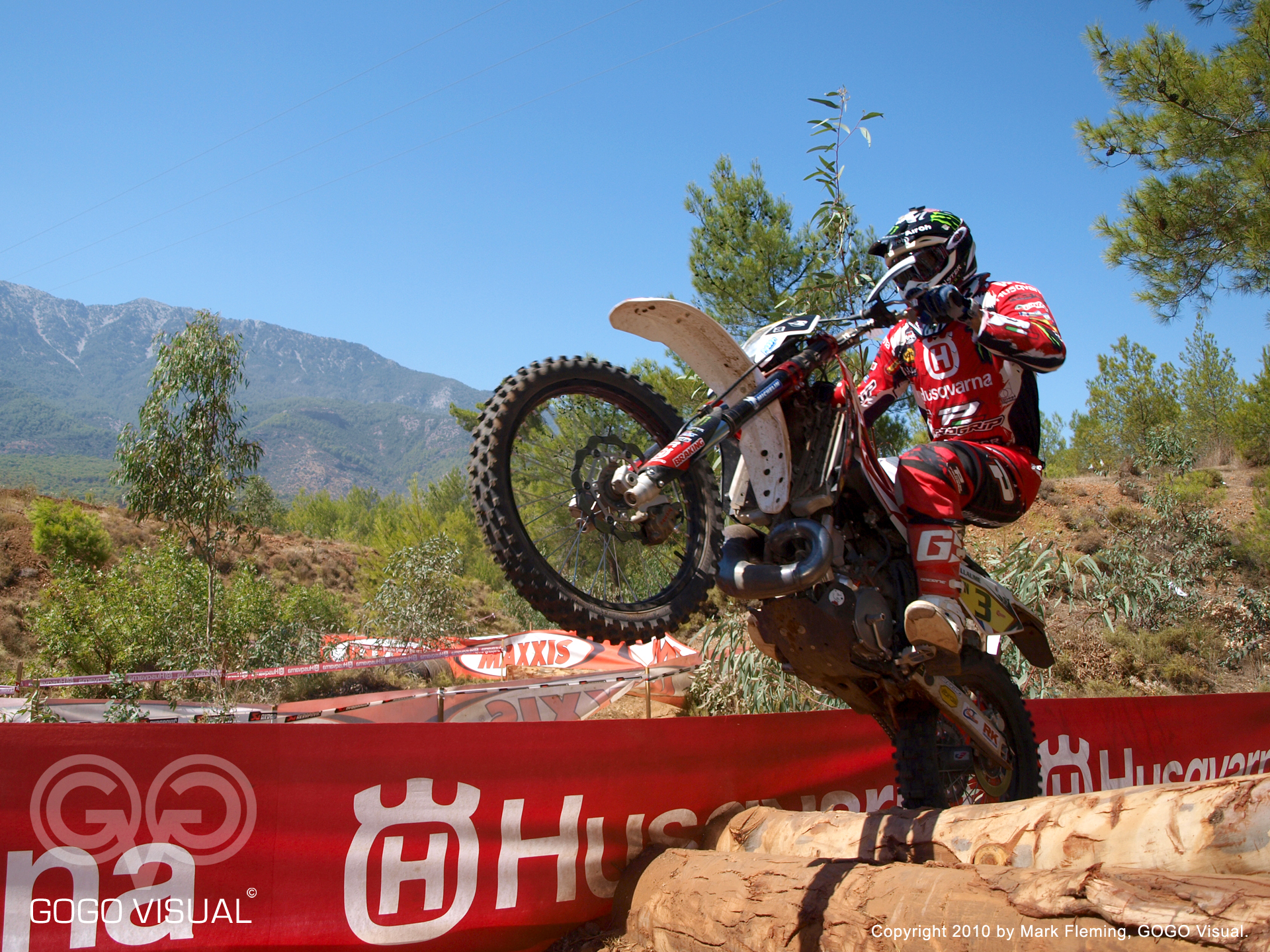
Sébastien Guillaume rides over logs

The competition classes of the WEC were revised for the 2004 season. The number of classes was reduced to three, and 2-stroke and 4-stroke machines were now competing in the same classes. The new classes were named Enduro 1, Enduro 2 and Enduro 3. The 2005 season saw a new addition; the Enduro Junior class (EJ). The age limit in the junior class was originally 21 years, but was later changed to 23. A class for female riders, Enduro Women, was started in 2010.

The points system of the WEC originally awarded points for 15 best riders in each class, starting with 20 for the winner, 17 for second place and 15 for third. Since the 2004 season, the twenty fastest riders have received points, with 25 going to the winner of each class, 22 for the second fastest and 20 for the third-placed rider.

The 2007 championship included six events in Europe, one in the United States and one in Canada. In the 2008 season, all eights rounds were held in Europe. The current main broadcaster of the championship is Eurosport 2. In South America and Oceania, the series is broadcast on ESPN and Fox Sports, respectively.

== Current classes ==
- Enduro 1 (E1) – Up to 250cc 2-stroke and 4-stroke.
- Enduro 2 (E2) – 255+ cc up to 450cc 4-stroke.
- Enduro 3 (E3) – 255+ cc 2-stroke and 450+ cc 4-stroke.
- Enduro GP – Rankings based on overall standings (E1-E2-E3).

== Champions ==
Season	80 cc two-stroke	125 cc two-stroke	250 cc two-stroke	350 cc four-stroke	500 cc two-stroke	+350 cc four-stroke
1990	(East Germany) Thomas Bieberbach (Simson)	(United Kingdom) Paul Edmondson (KTM)	(Finland) Kari Tiainen (Suzuki)	(Czech Republic) Otakar Kotrba (Husqvarna)	(Sweden) Peter Hansson (KTM)	(Sweden) Jimmie Eriksson (Husaberg)
1991	(Italy) Pierfranco Muraglia (Kawasaki)	(Sweden) Jeff Nilsson (KTM)	(Finland) Kari Tiainen (Husqvarna)	(Sweden) Kent Karlsson (Husaberg)	(Sweden) Sven-Erik Jönsson (Husqvarna)	(Slovakia) Jaroslav Katriňák (Husaberg)
1992	(Italy) Francesco Molinari (HRD)	(Sweden) Jeff Nilsson (KTM)	(Italy) Giorgio Grasso (Kawasaki)	(Italy) Mario Rinaldi (KTM)	(Italy) Tulio Pellegrinelli (Honda)	(Finland) Kari Tiainen (Husqvarna)
1993	(Italy) Gian-Marco Rossi (TM)	(United Kingdom) Paul Edmondson (Husqvarna)	(Italy) Giorgio Grasso (Kawasaki)	(Sweden) Sven-Erik Jönsson (Husqvarna)	(Italy) Giovanni Sala (KTM)	(Italy) Fabio Farioli (KTM)
						500 cc four-stroke
1994		(United Kingdom) Paul Edmondson (Gas Gas)	(Italy) Giovanni Sala (KTM)	(Italy) Mario Rinaldi (KTM)		(Finland) Kari Tiainen (Husqvarna)
1995		(Finland) Petteri Silván (Husqvarna)	(Italy) Giovanni Sala (KTM)	(Sweden) Anders Eriksson (Husaberg)		(Finland) Kari Tiainen (Husqvarna)
1996		(Italy) Fausto Scovolo (Honda)	(United Kingdom) Paul Edmondson (Gas Gas)	(Sweden) Anders Eriksson (Husqvarna)		(Sweden) Peter Jansson (Husaberg)
1997		(Australia) Shane Watts (KTM)	(France) Stéphane Peterhansel (Yamaha)	(Italy) Mario Rinaldi (KTM)		(Finland) Kari Tiainen (KTM)
	250 cc four-stroke	125 cc two-stroke	250 cc two-stroke	400 cc four-stroke		500 cc four-stroke
1998	(Italy) Gian-Marco Rossi (Honda)	(Czech Republic) Roman Michalík (TM)	(Italy) Giovanni Sala (KTM)	(Sweden) Björne Carlsson (Husaberg)		(Sweden) Anders Eriksson (Husqvarna)
1999	(Finland) Vesa Kytönen (Kawasaki)	(Finland) Juha Salminen (KTM)	(Finland) Petteri Silván (Gas Gas)	(Italy) Giovanni Sala (KTM)		(Sweden) Anders Eriksson (Husqvarna)
2000	(Italy) Matteo Rubin (KTM)	(Finland) Juha Salminen (KTM)	(Australia) Stefan Merriman (Husqvarna)	(Italy) Mario Rinaldi (KTM)		(Finland) Kari Tiainen (KTM)
2001	(France) Stéphane Peterhansel (Yamaha)	(Finland) Petteri Silván (Husqvarna)	(Finland) Juha Salminen (KTM)	(Australia) Stefan Merriman (Husqvarna)		(Sweden) Anders Eriksson (Husqvarna)
2002	(Sweden) Peter Bergvall (Yamaha)	(Finland) Petteri Silván (Husqvarna)	(Finland) Samuli Aro (Husqvarna)	(Finland) Juha Salminen (KTM)		(Sweden) Anders Eriksson (Husqvarna)
2003	(Sweden) Peter Bergvall (Yamaha)	(Finland) Petri Pohjamo (Gas Gas)	(Australia) Stefan Merriman (Honda)	(Sweden) Anders Eriksson (Husqvarna)		(Finland) Juha Salminen (KTM)
	E1		E2		E3	
2004	(Australia) Stefan Merriman (Yamaha)		(Finland) Juha Salminen (KTM)		(Finland) Samuli Aro (KTM)	
2005	(Spain) Iván Cervantes (KTM)		(Finland) Samuli Aro (KTM)		(United Kingdom) David Knight (KTM)	
2006	(Spain) Iván Cervantes (KTM)		(Finland) Samuli Aro (KTM)		(United Kingdom) David Knight (KTM)	
2007	(Finland) Juha Salminen (KTM)		(Finland) Mika Ahola (Honda)		(Spain) Iván Cervantes (KTM)	
2008	(Finland) Mika Ahola (Honda)		(France) Johnny Aubert (Yamaha)		(Finland) Samuli Aro (KTM)	
2009	(Finland) Mika Ahola (Honda)		(France) Johnny Aubert (KTM)		(Spain) Iván Cervantes (KTM)	
2010	(France) Antoine Méo (Husqvarna)		(Finland) Mika Ahola (Honda)		(United Kingdom) David Knight (KTM)	
2011	(Finland) Juha Salminen (Husqvarna)		(France) Antoine Méo (Husqvarna)		(Finland) Mika Ahola (Honda)	
2012	(France) Antoine Méo (KTM)		(France) Pierre-Alexandre Renet (Husaberg)		(France) Christophe Nambotin (KTM)	
2013	(France) Antoine Méo (KTM)		(Italy) Alex Salvini (Honda)		(France) Christophe Nambotin (KTM)	
2014	(France) Christophe Nambotin (KTM)		(France) Pierre-Alexandre Renet (Husqvarna)		(Australia) Matthew Phillips (KTM)	
2015	(Finland) Eero Remes (TM)		(France) Antoine Méo (KTM)		(France) Mathias Bellino (Husqvarna)	
2016	(Finland) Eero Remes (TM)		(Australia) Matthew Phillips (Sherco)		(United Kingdom) Steve Holcombe (Beta)	
	Enduro GP			Enduro 2		
2017	(United Kingdom) Steve Holcombe (Beta)			(Spain) Josep García (KTM)		
	Enduro GP			Enduro 1	Enduro 2	Enduro 3
2018	(United Kingdom) Steve Holcombe (Beta)			(United Kingdom) Brad Freeman (Beta)	(Finland) Eero Remes (TM)	(United Kingdom) Steve Holcombe (Beta)
2019	(United Kingdom) Brad Freeman (Beta)			(United Kingdom) Brad Freeman (Beta)	(France) Loïc Larrieu (TM)	(United Kingdom) Steve Holcombe (Beta)
2020	(United Kingdom) Steve Holcombe (Beta)			(Italy) Andrea Verona (TM)	(United Kingdom) Steve Holcombe (Beta)	(United Kingdom) Brad Freeman (Beta)
2021	(United Kingdom) Brad Freeman (Beta)			(Italy) Andrea Verona (Gas Gas)	(Spain) Josep García (KTM)	(United Kingdom) Brad Freeman (Beta)
2022	(Italy) Andrea Verona (Gas Gas)			(Italy) Andrea Verona (Gas Gas)	(Australia) Wil Ruprecht (TM)	(United Kingdom) Brad Freeman (Beta)
2023	(United Kingdom) Steve Holcombe (Beta)			(Spain) Josep García (KTM)	(United Kingdom) Steve Holcombe (Beta)	(United Kingdom) Brad Freeman (Beta)
2024	(Spain) Josep García (KTM)			(Spain) Josep García (KTM)	(Italy) Andrea Verona (Gas Gas)	(United Kingdom) Brad Freeman (Beta)
2025	(Spain) Josep García (KTM)			(Spain) Josep García (KTM)	(Italy) Andrea Verona (Gas Gas)	(New Zealand) Hamish MacDonald (Sherco)
2026	(Spain) Josep García (KTM)			(Spain) Josep García (KTM)	(Italy) Andrea Verona (KTM)	(United Kingdom) Steve Holcombe (Sherco)

=== Overall championship ===
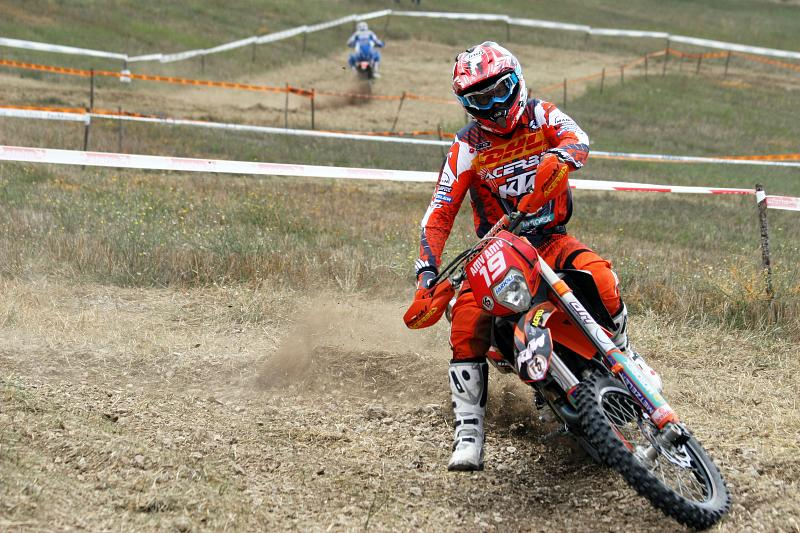
Eight-time class and five-time overall champion Salminen rides his KTM in 2008.

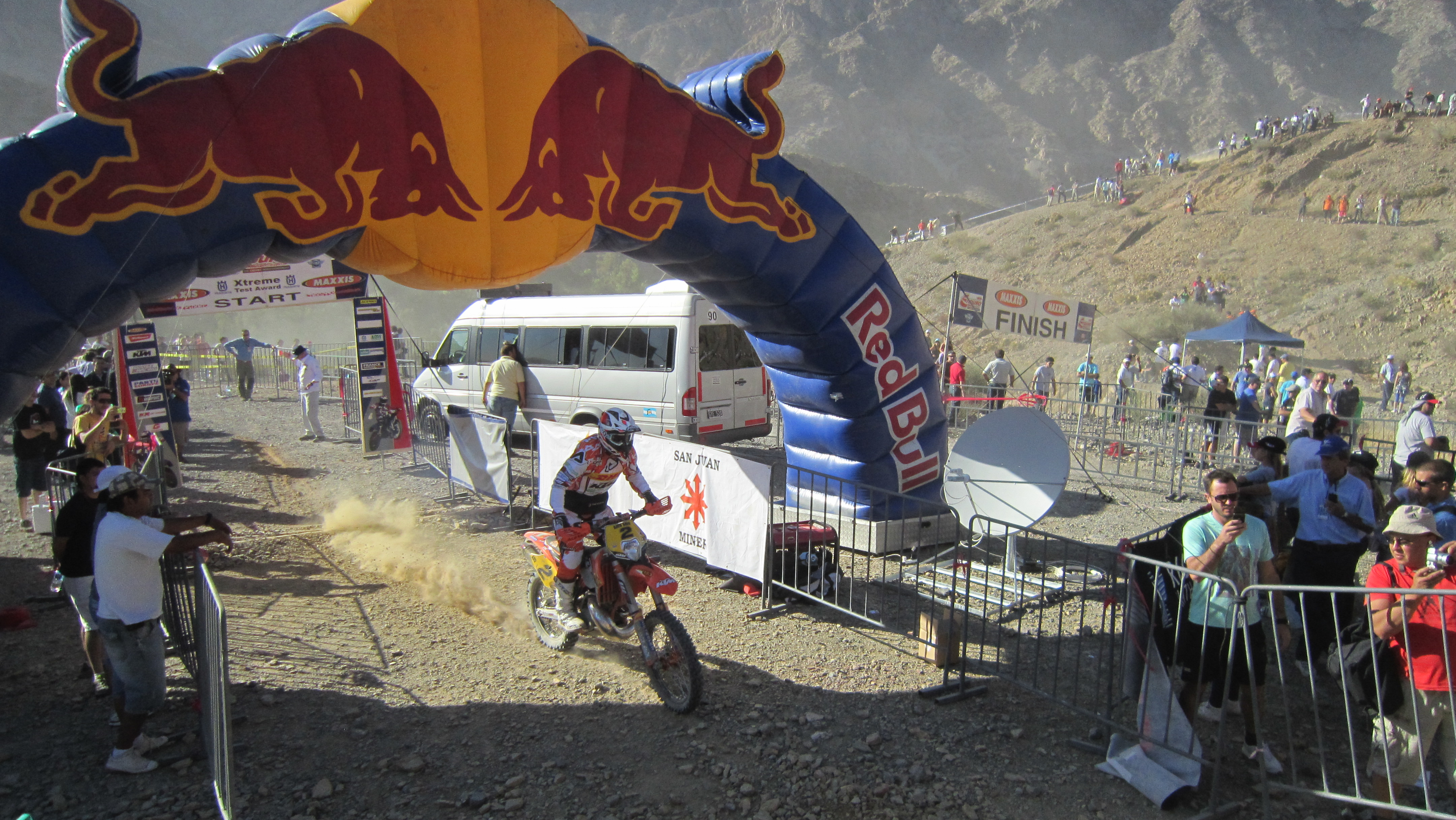
Cristophe Nambotin during 2012 World Enduro Championship in San Juan, Argentina

Season	Rider	Bike
1998	(Italy) Giovanni Sala	250 cc KTM
1999	(Finland) Petteri Silván	250 cc Gas Gas
2000	(Finland) Juha Salminen	125 cc KTM
2001	(Finland) Juha Salminen	250 cc KTM
2002	(Finland) Juha Salminen	400 cc KTM
2003	(Finland) Juha Salminen	500 cc KTM
2004	(Finland) Juha Salminen	E2 KTM

=== Junior championship ===
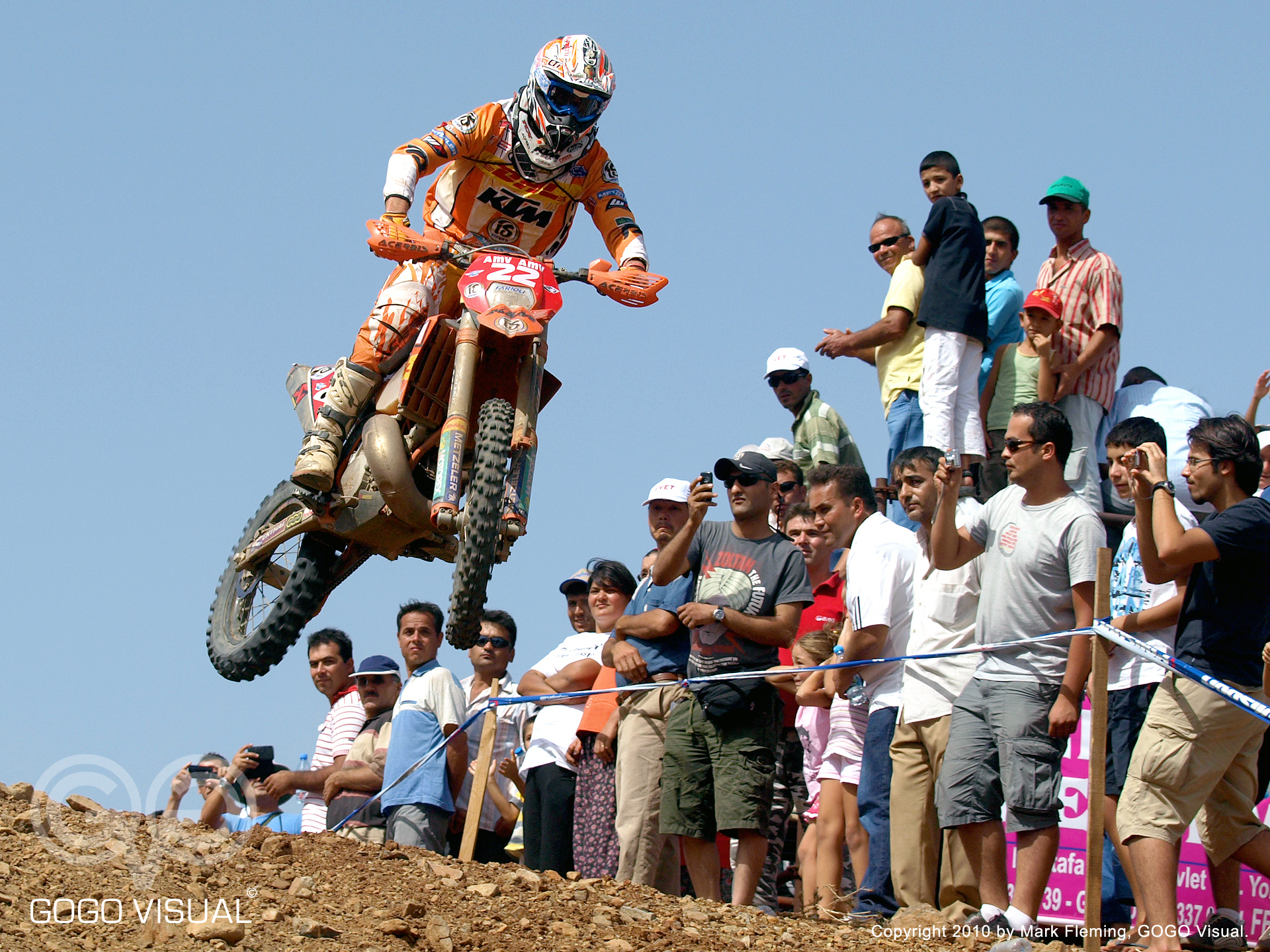
Thomas Oldrati in 2010

Season	Rider	Team
2005	(Spain) Cristóbal Guerrero	Gas Gas
2006	(Sweden) Joakim Ljunggren	Husaberg
2007	(Sweden) Joakim Ljunggren	Husaberg
2008	(Italy) Thomas Oldrati	KTM
2009	(Spain) Oriol Mena	Husaberg
2010	(Spain) Lorenzo Santolino	KTM
2011	(France) Jérémy Joly	Honda
2012	(France) Mathias Bellino	Husaberg
2013	(Australia) Matt Phillips	Husqvarna
2014	(United Kingdom) Daniel McCanney	Beta
2015	(United Kingdom) Jamie McCanney	Husqvarna
2016	(Italy) Giacomo Redondi	Honda
2017	(United Kingdom) Brad Freeman	Beta
2018	(Italy) Matteo Cavallo	Beta
2019	(Italy) Andrea Verona	TM
2020	(New Zealand) Hamish MacDonald	Sherco
2021	(Italy) Matteo Pavoni	TM
2022	(France) Zach Pichon	Sherco
2023	(United Kingdom) Jed Etchells	Fantic
2024	(Sweden) Max Ahlin	KTM
2025	(Sweden) Axel Semb	Fantic
2026	(Italy) Alberto Elgari	TM

=== Women championship ===
Season	Rider	Team
2010	(France) Ludivine Puy	Gas Gas
2011	(France) Ludivine Puy	Gas Gas
2012	(Spain) Laia Sanz	Gas Gas
2013	(Spain) Laia Sanz	Honda
2014	(Spain) Laia Sanz	Honda
2015	(Spain) Laia Sanz	KTM
2016	(Spain) Laia Sanz	KTM
2017	(Germany) Maria Franke	KTM
2018	(Finland) Sanna Karkkainen	KTM
2019	(United Kingdom) Jane Daniels	Husqvarna
2020	(United Kingdom) Jane Daniels	Husqvarna
2021	(Spain) Laia Sanz	Gas Gas
2022	(United Kingdom) Jane Daniels	Fantic
2023	(United Kingdom) Jane Daniels	Fantic
2024	(Spain) Mireia Badia	Rieju
2025	(United States) Rachel Gutish	Rieju
2026	(United States) Rachel Gutish	Rieju

=== Youth Championship ===
Season	Rider	Team
2009	(France) Romain Dumontier	Husqvarna
2010	(Spain) Mario Román	KTM
2011	(Italy) Jonathan Manzi	KTM
2012	(Italy) Giacomo Redondi	KTM
2013	(United Kingdom) Jamie McCanney	Husaberg
2014	(Italy) Davide Soreca	Yamaha
2015	(Sweden) Mikael Persson	Yamaha
2016	(United Kingdom) Jack Edmondson	KTM
2017	(Italy) Andrea Verona	TM
2018	(Chile) Ruy Barbosa	Husqvarna
2019	(New Zealand) Hamish MacDonald	Sherco
2020	(Spain) Sergio Navarro	Husqvarna
2021	(Sweden) Albin Norrbin	Fantic
2022	(United Kingdom) Harry Edmondson	Fantic
2023	(Italy) Kevin Cristino	Fantic
2024	(Italy) Manuel Verzeroli	KTM
2025	(France) Romain Dagna	KTM
2026	(Italy) Pietro Scardina	TM

== See also ==
- International Six Days Enduro, the team championship of enduro
- FIM SuperEnduro World Championship
