= Mika Ahola =

Finnish motorcycle racer

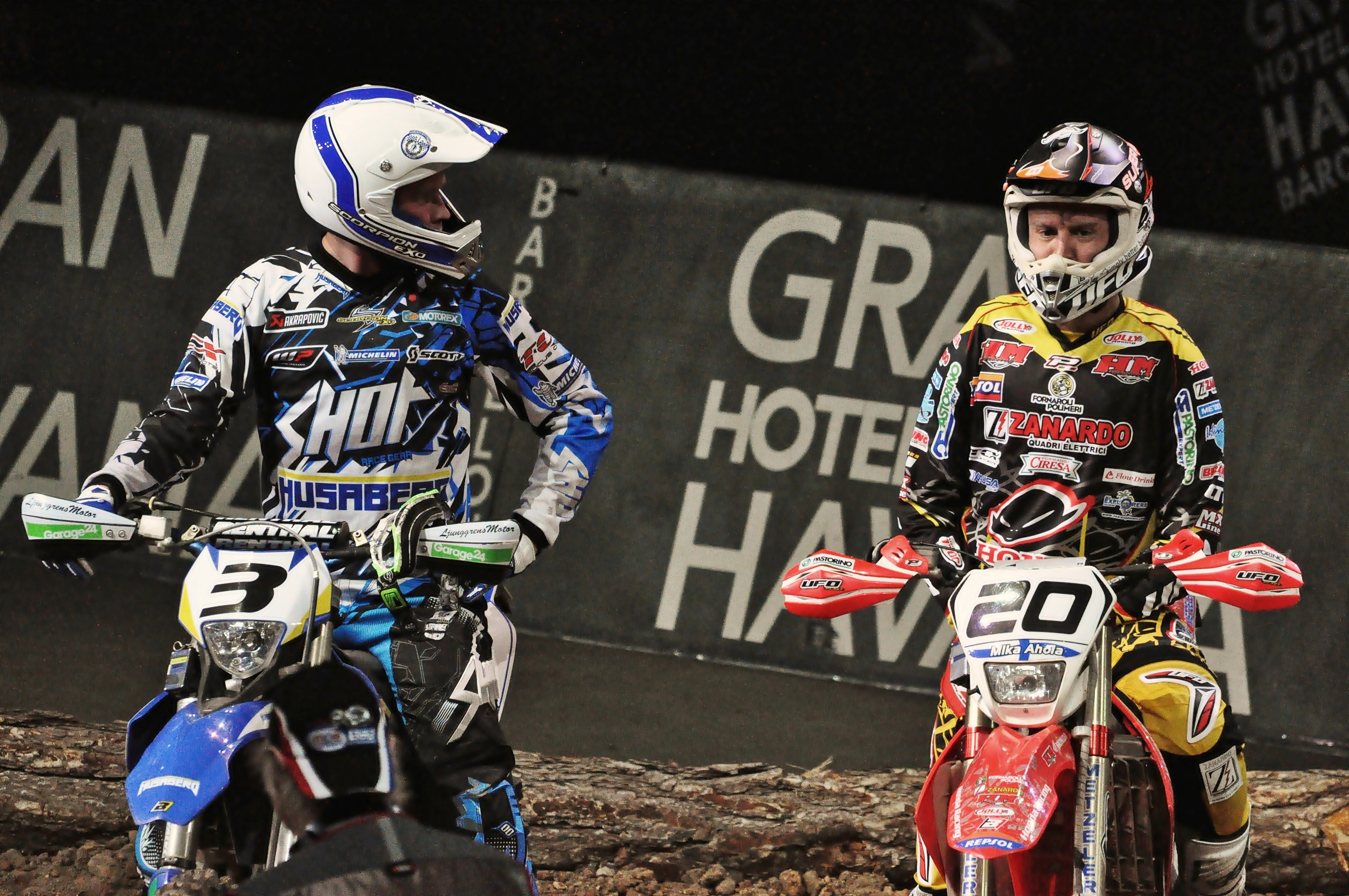
- Ahola (right) in 2011
- Nationality: (Finland) Finnish
- Born: December 13, 1974 Hämeenlinna, Finland
- Died: 15 January 2012 (aged 37) Barcelona, Spain

Motocross career
- Years active: 1993-2012
- Teams: Husqvarna, TM, Honda
- Championships: 5 Enduro World Championship; E1 (2008, 2009); E2 (2007, 2010); E3 (2011)
- Wins: 71

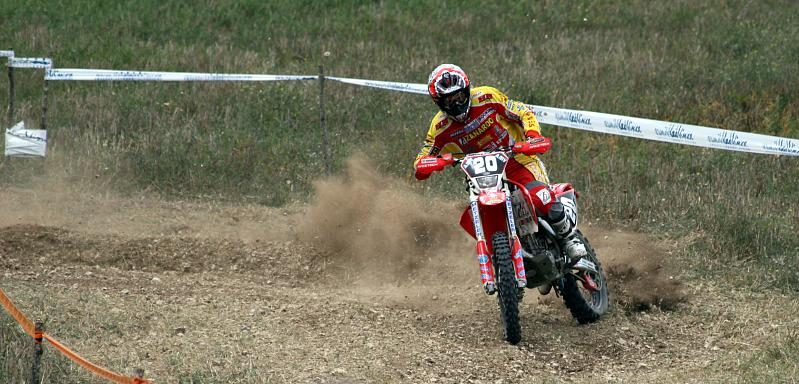
Ahola at the 2008 WEC GP of Italy.

Mika Ahola (13 December 1974 – 15 January 2012) was a Finnish enduro rider and a five-time world champion. He was also a seven-time winner of the International Six Days Enduro (ISDE) World Trophy with Team Finland, and was the fastest overall in the competition in 1999, 2001 and 2002.

Ahola debuted in the World Enduro Championship in a Husqvarna in 1993, and became a regular title contender after joining the TM factory team in 1997. In 2001, he finished runner-up for the third time, after losing the final round in Sweden and the 500 cc world title to Anders Eriksson by 0.06 seconds and a single point, respectively. Ahola took three more wins than Eriksson, but a mechanical problem in the second round in Slovakia proved costly for his title chase. After another second placing in 2002 and a third in 2003, he briefly moved to Husqvarna until signing for Honda for the 2006 season, which saw him finish second to KTM's Samuli Aro in the E2 class.

In 2007, Ahola took seven wins and finished on the podium in all but one event, beating compatriot Aro and Yamaha's Johnny Aubert to finally win the world championship. For the 2008 season, he moved to the E1 class and took his second world title ahead of KTM's Iván Cervantes. Ahola went on to win a fourth consecutive title in 2010. In 2011, he moved to the E3 class and became the first rider to win the world championship in all the three current categories.

Ahola debuted in the Barcelona Indoor Enduro in 2003, resulting fourth. He ended fourth again in 2004 and fifth in 2006. The rider entered the FIM Indoor Enduro World Cup in 2007/08, where he took two podiums and resulted third in points. In 2008/09 he got three podiums and ended fourth in the standings. The rider resulted sixth in 2009/10 with a best result of third. The Finn won a race and collected three podiums, to end third in points.

Ahola announced his retirement from enduro racing on New Year's Day 2012. Ahola died of internal injuries on 15 January 2012 at a hospital in Barcelona, a few weeks after crashing while training in Girona, Spain.

== Career summary ==
Season	Series	Class	Team	Wins	Final placing
1993	World Enduro Championship	125 cc	Husqvarna	0	10th
1994	World Enduro Championship	125 cc	Husqvarna	0	13th
1995	World Enduro Championship	125 cc	Husqvarna	0	15th
1996	World Enduro Championship	125 cc	Husqvarna	0	9th
1997	World Enduro Championship	125 cc	TM	5	2nd
1998	World Enduro Championship	250 cc	TM	3	9th
1999	World Enduro Championship	250 cc	TM	1	3rd
2000	World Enduro Championship	250 cc	TM	3	2nd
2001	World Enduro Championship	500 cc	VOR	5	2nd
2002	World Enduro Championship	500 cc	VOR	6	2nd
2003	World Enduro Championship	500 cc	VOR	2	3rd
2004	World Enduro Championship	E3	Husqvarna	0	4th
2005	World Enduro Championship	E3	Husqvarna	0	4th
2006	World Enduro Championship	E2	Honda	2	2nd
2007	World Enduro Championship	E2	Honda	7	1st
2008	World Enduro Championship	E1	Honda	9	1st
2009	World Enduro Championship	E1	Honda	9	1st
2010	World Enduro Championship	E2	Honda	10	1st
2011	World Enduro Championship	E3	Honda	9	1st

=== ISDE ===
Season	Location	Class	Team	Final placing
1993	Assen, Netherlands	World Trophy	Finland	10th
1994	Tulsa, United States	World Trophy	Finland	5th
1995	Jelenia Góra, Poland	World Trophy	Finland	3rd
1996	Hämeenlinna, Finland	World Trophy	Finland	1st
1997	Brescia, Italy	World Trophy	Finland	2nd
1998	Traralgon, Australia	World Trophy	Finland	1st
1999	Coimbra, Portugal	World Trophy	Finland	1st
2000	Granada, Spain	World Trophy	Finland	18th
2001	Brive-la-Gaillarde, France	World Trophy	Finland	16th
2002	Jablonec nad Nisou, Czech Republic	World Trophy	Finland	1st
2003	Fortaleza, Brazil	World Trophy	Finland	1st
2004	Kielce, Poland	World Trophy	Finland	1st
2005	Považská Bystrica, Slovakia	World Trophy	Finland	2nd
2006	Taupō, New Zealand	World Trophy	Finland	1st
