= Samuli Aro =

Finnish motorcycle racer (born 1975)

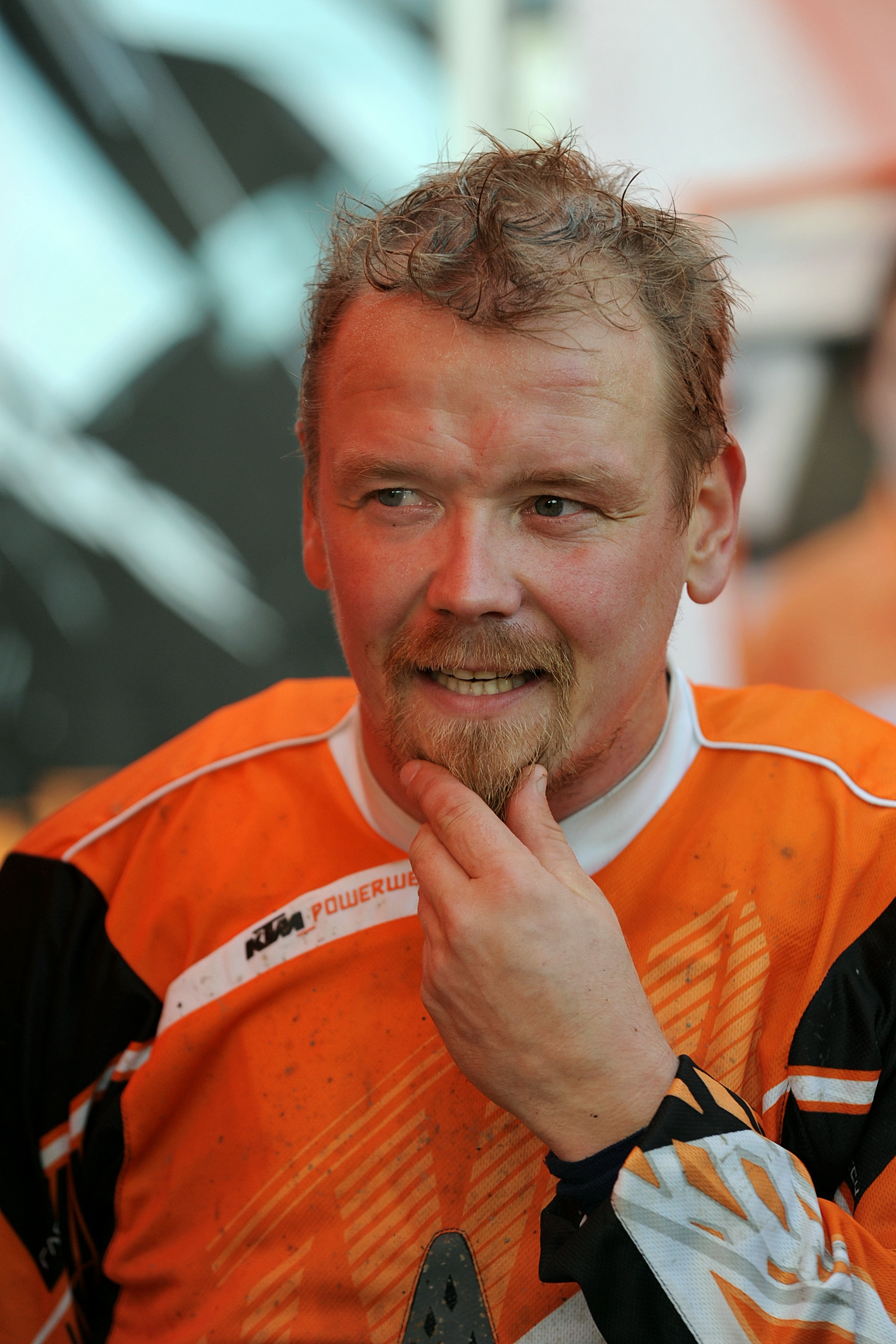
Aro at the final round of the 2010 Finnish Enduro Championship.

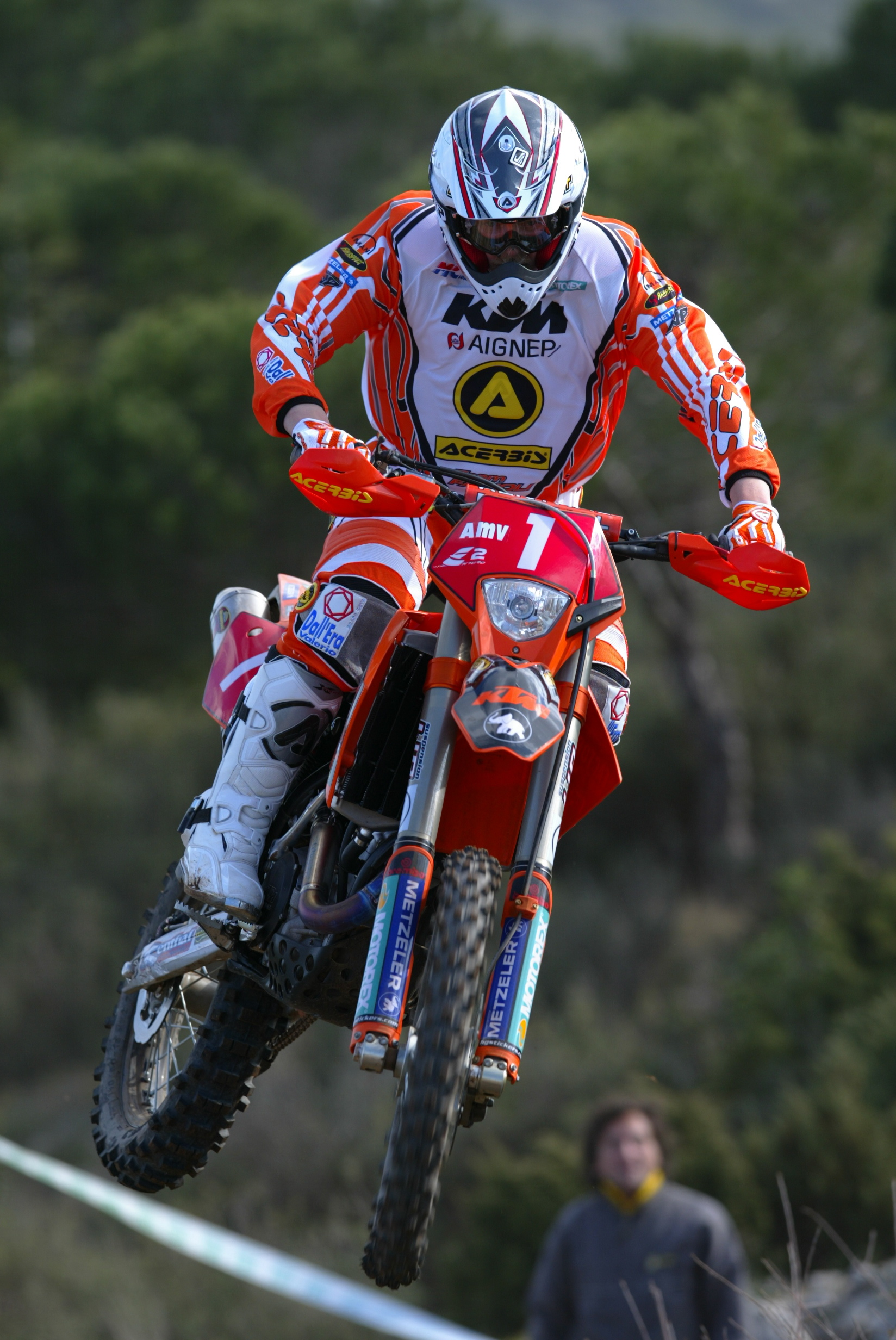
Aro riding his KTM bike.

Samuli Aro (born 12 April 1975 in Järvenpää) is a Finnish enduro rider. He is a five-time World Enduro Champion and has also won the International Six Days Enduro (ISDE) World Trophy with Team Finland five times.

Aro debuted in the World Enduro Championship in 1998, and took his first world title in 2002 with Husqvarna in the 250 cc class. After moving to KTM for the 2003 season, he placed second in the championship behind Honda's Stefan Merriman. He went on to win the World Enduro Championship three times in a row; in 2004 in the Enduro 3 class, and in 2005 and 2006 in the Enduro 2 class. In the 2008 season, after a second place to Honda rider Mika Ahola in 2007, Aro became one of the few enduro riders to win five world championship titles. He retired from the world championship after the 2009 season, during which he placed fourth in the standings.

== Career summary ==
Season	Series	Class	Team	Wins	Final placing
1998	World Enduro Championship	125 cc	Yamaha	0	19th
1999	World Enduro Championship	125 cc	Yamaha	0	9th
2000	World Enduro Championship	250 cc	Yamaha	0	8th
2001	World Enduro Championship	250 cc	Husqvarna	3	3rd
2002	World Enduro Championship	250 cc	Husqvarna	11	1st
2003	World Enduro Championship	250 cc	KTM	5	2nd
2004	World Enduro Championship	E3	KTM	11	1st
2005	World Enduro Championship	E2	KTM	5	1st
2006	World Enduro Championship	E2	KTM	6	1st
2007	World Enduro Championship	E2	KTM	2	2nd
2008	World Enduro Championship	E3	KTM	5	1st
2009	World Enduro Championship	E3	KTM	0	4th

=== ISDE ===
Season	Location	Class	Team	Final placing
1999	Coimbra, Portugal	World Trophy	Finland	1st
2000	Granada, Spain	World Trophy	Finland	18th
2001	Brive-la-Gaillarde, France	World Trophy	Finland	16th
2002	Jablonec nad Nisou, Czech Republic	World Trophy	Finland	1st
2003	Fortaleza, Brazil	World Trophy	Finland	1st
2004	Kielce, Poland	World Trophy	Finland	1st
2005	Považská Bystrica, Slovakia	World Trophy	Finland	2nd
2006	Taupō, New Zealand	World Trophy	Finland	1st
2009	Figueira da Foz, Portugal	World Trophy	Finland	3rd
