= 2008 World Enduro Championship =

Championship season

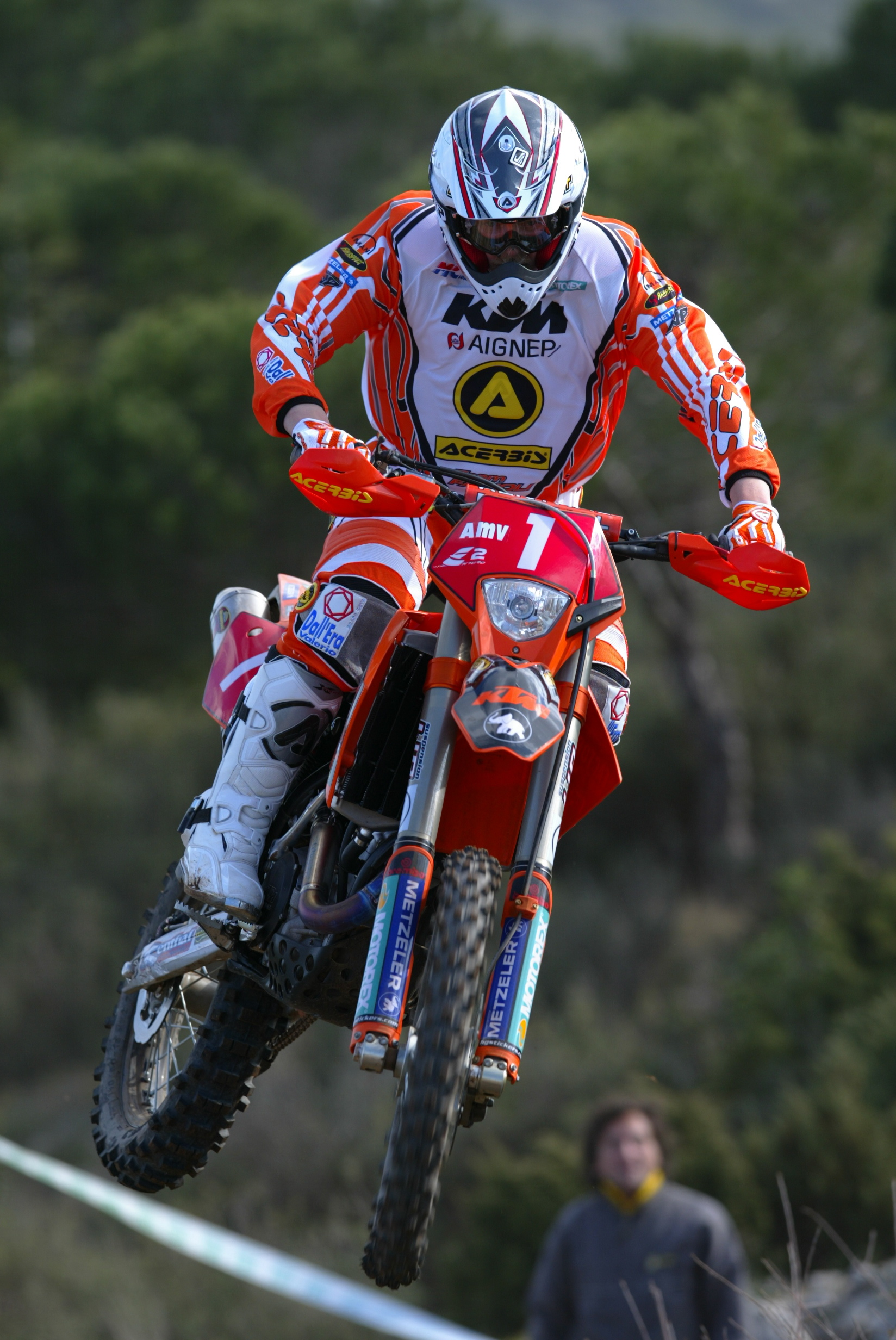
Samuli Aro won his fifth world championship title.

The 2008 World Enduro Championship was the 19th season in the FIM World Enduro Championship. The season consisted of eight events and 16 races.

Last season's Enduro 2 champion, Honda's Mika Ahola, took his second world championship title now racing in the Enduro 1 class. In the Enduro 2 class, Yamaha's Johnny Aubert won his first world championship, becoming the first racer to defeat Juha Salminen since the 1998 season. With nine wins, Salminen broke compatriot Kari Tiainen's record (77) for most wins in the series. In Enduro 3, KTM's Samuli Aro became the sixth enduro rider to win five world championship titles.

== Events ==
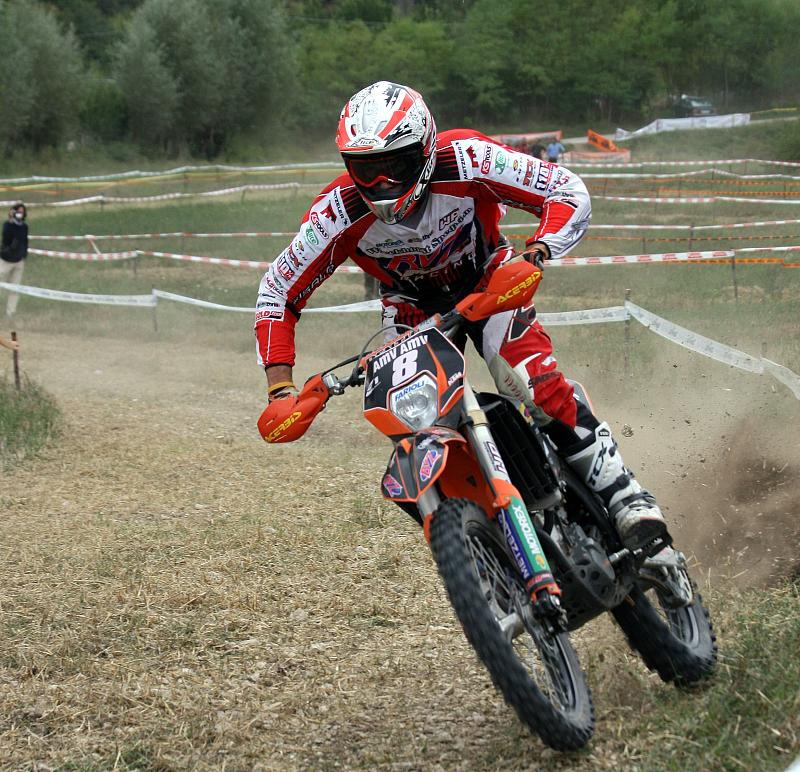
Mike Hartmann riding his KTM at the Grand Prix of Italy.

Round	Event	Location	Dates
1	WEC GP Maxxis of Sweden	Östersund	15–16 March
2	WEC GP Polisport of Portugal	Vale de Cambra	19–30 March
3	WEC GP AMV of Spain	Sitges	5–6 April
4	WEC GP Maxxis of Poland	Kwidzyn	14–15 June
5	WEC GP of Wales	Llanidloes	19–20 July
6	WEC GP AMV of France	Uzerche	25–27 July
7	WEC GP LeoVince of Italy	Piediluco	27–28 September
8	WEC GP AMV of Europe	Mende, France	11–12 October

== Riders' championship - top 10 ==
=== Enduro 1 ===
Pos	Driver	Team	SWE (Sweden)		POR (Portugal)		ESP (Spain)		POL (Poland)		GBR (United Kingdom)		FRA (France)		ITA (Italy)		EUR (Europe)		Pts
1	(Finland) Mika Ahola	Honda	1	1	2	3	1	1	2	2	3	1	2	2	1	1	1	1	375
2	(Spain) Iván Cervantes	KTM	6	2	3	1	2	2	1	1	4	2	1	1	4	3	3	2	346
3	(Italy) Simone Albergoni	Yamaha	2	3	1	2	4	3	4	3	2	4	5	5	5	6	4	5	302
4	(France) Marc Germain	Yamaha	4	6	6		5	5	3	6	1	3	3	4	2	2	2	3	284
5	(Italy) Maurizio Micheluz	Yamaha	7	7	5		7	7	6	5	8	8	6	7	3	4	7	7	224
6	(Spain) Cristóbal Guerrero	Yamaha	8	9	7	6	6	6	5	4	7	6	4	3	Inj	Inj	Inj	Inj	185
7	(Finland) Eero Remes	KTM	3	4	4	4	3	4	Inj	Inj	Inj	Inj	Inj	Inj	11	5	5	4	172
8	(United Kingdom) Tom Sagar	KTM			8	5	9		7	8	5	5	8	6	9		9	9	164
9	(Germany) Mike Hartmann	KTM	15	13	10		10	8	9	7	11	9	11	9	7	8		11	156
10	(France) Jordan Curvalle	Suzuki	10	12	11	8	12	11	8	10	12	10	10	8		10			141
Pos	Driver	Team	SWE (Sweden)		POR (Portugal)		ESP (Spain)		POL (Poland)		GBR (United Kingdom)		FRA (France)		ITA (Italy)		EUR (Europe)		Pts

=== Enduro 2 ===
Pos	Driver	Team	SWE (Sweden)		POR (Portugal)		ESP (Spain)		POL (Poland)		GBR (United Kingdom)		FRA (France)		ITA (Italy)		EUR (Europe)		Pts
1	(France) Johnny Aubert	Yamaha	2	3	1	2	1	1	2	2	3	1	2	2	1	2	2	3	361
2	(Finland) Juha Salminen	KTM	3	1	2	1		2	1	1	1	2	3	1	2	1	1	1	353
3	(Italy) Alessandro Belometti	KTM	7	7	4	4	3	6	3	5	11	11	6	6	4	3	4	4	259
4	(France) Rodrig Thain	TM	6	9	8	10	9	4	4	10		5	5	4	3	5	7	5	226
5	(France) Antoine Meo	Husqvarna	5	6			2	3		4	9	9	4	3	12	4	3	2	222
6	(Sweden) Joakim Ljunggren	Husaberg	1	2	3		4	7	8	7	5	8	11		9	9	5	9	217
7	(Italy) Fabrizio Dini	Yamaha	9	12	7	6	6	5	9	9	10	15	12	10	5	8	9	8	196
8	(France) Nicolas Paganon	Aprilia			6	5	13	16	11	13	6	7	10	8	7	7	6	6	173
9	(Italy) Fabio Mossini	Honda	16		5	9	10	9	13	8		16	7		6	6	14	7	147
10	(Finland) Simo Kirssi	BMW		8		7	8		5	3	8	10	8	5		11			139
Pos	Driver	Team	SWE (Sweden)		POR (Portugal)		ESP (Spain)		POL (Poland)		GBR (United Kingdom)		FRA (France)		ITA (Italy)		EUR (Europe)		Pts

=== Enduro 3 ===
Pos	Driver	Team	SWE (Sweden)		POR (Portugal)		ESP (Spain)		POL (Poland)		GBR (United Kingdom)		FRA (France)		ITA (Italy)		EUR (Europe)		Pts
1	(Finland) Samuli Aro	KTM	1	1	1	2	1	1	2	3	4	6	4	6	4	6	2	4	328
2	(Finland) Marko Tarkkala	KTM	2	2	2	5	4	3	4	1	3	2	5	2	8	5	1	3	317
3	(France) Sébastien Guillaume	Husqvarna	5	5	7	8	3	5	1	4	2	1	2	1	2	3	12	6	298
4	(France) Christophe Nambotin	Gas Gas	6	6	4	1	2	2	5	2	1	4	1	16	3	2	7	8	297
5	(New Zealand) Stefan Merriman	Aprilia	13	13	6	4	7	4	3		11	3	3	3	1	1		1	246
6	(Germany) Marcus Kehr	KTM	7	8	3	3	12	6	6	5	5	5	13	4	10	9	5	7	233
7	(Sweden) Björne Carlsson	Husaberg	3	3	8	7	9	7	9	8	6	11	9		9	10	10		189
8	(Spain) Xavier Galindo	KTM	11	10	9	10	6	8	8		7	7	6	5	7	8	8		184
9	(Italy) Alessandro Botturi	Honda	8	7	11		10	10	7	6			7	8	6	4	9	5	176
10	(Sweden) Anders Eriksson	BMW	4	4		9	11	14	13	7	8	9	10	9	11	11	6		170
Pos	Driver	Team	SWE (Sweden)		POR (Portugal)		ESP (Spain)		POL (Poland)		GBR (United Kingdom)		FRA (France)		ITA (Italy)		EUR (Europe)		Pts

== Manufacturers' championship ==
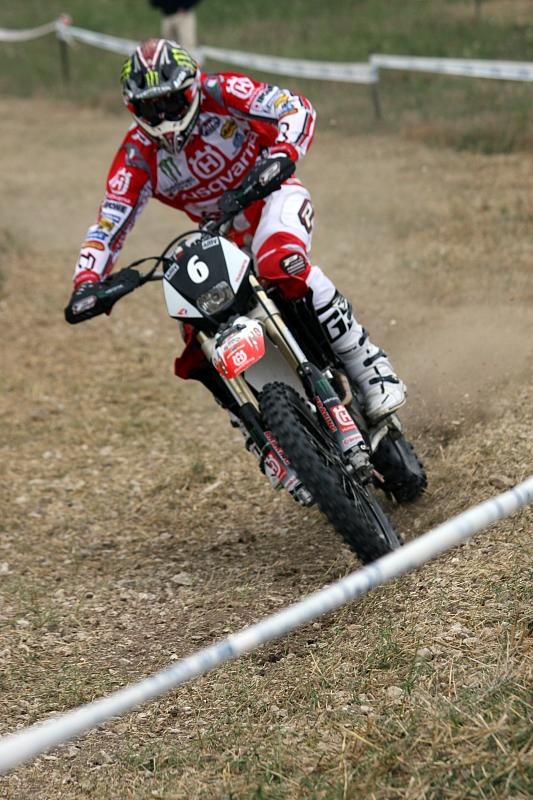
Bartosz Obłucki riding a Husqvarna.

Enduro 1
Pos	Manufacturer	Pts
1	(Japan) Honda	375
2	(Austria) KTM	351
3	(Japan) Yamaha	338
4	(Italy) Husqvarna	198
5	(Japan) Suzuki	154
6	(Italy) TM	102
7	(Japan) Kawasaki	57
8	(France) Sherco	12

Enduro 2
Pos	Manufacturer	Pts
1	(Austria) KTM	378
2	(Japan) Yamaha	361
3	(Italy) Husqvarna	248
4	(Sweden) Husaberg	243
5	(Italy) TM	226
6	(Japan) Honda	214
7	(Germany) BMW	191
8	(Italy) Aprilia	173
9	(Spain) Gas Gas	134
10	(Italy) Beta	66
11	(Japan) Suzuki	62
12	(Japan) Kawasaki	12

Enduro 3
Pos	Manufacturer	Pts
1	(Austria) KTM	355
2	(Italy) Husqvarna	298
3	(Spain) Gas Gas	297
4	(Italy) Aprilia	271
5	(Sweden) Husaberg	189
6	(Japan) Honda	179
7	(Germany) BMW	170
8	(Italy) TM	112
9	(Italy) Beta	61
10	(Japan) Yamaha	30
11	(France) Sherco	11
