= Juha Salminen =

Finnish motorcycle racer

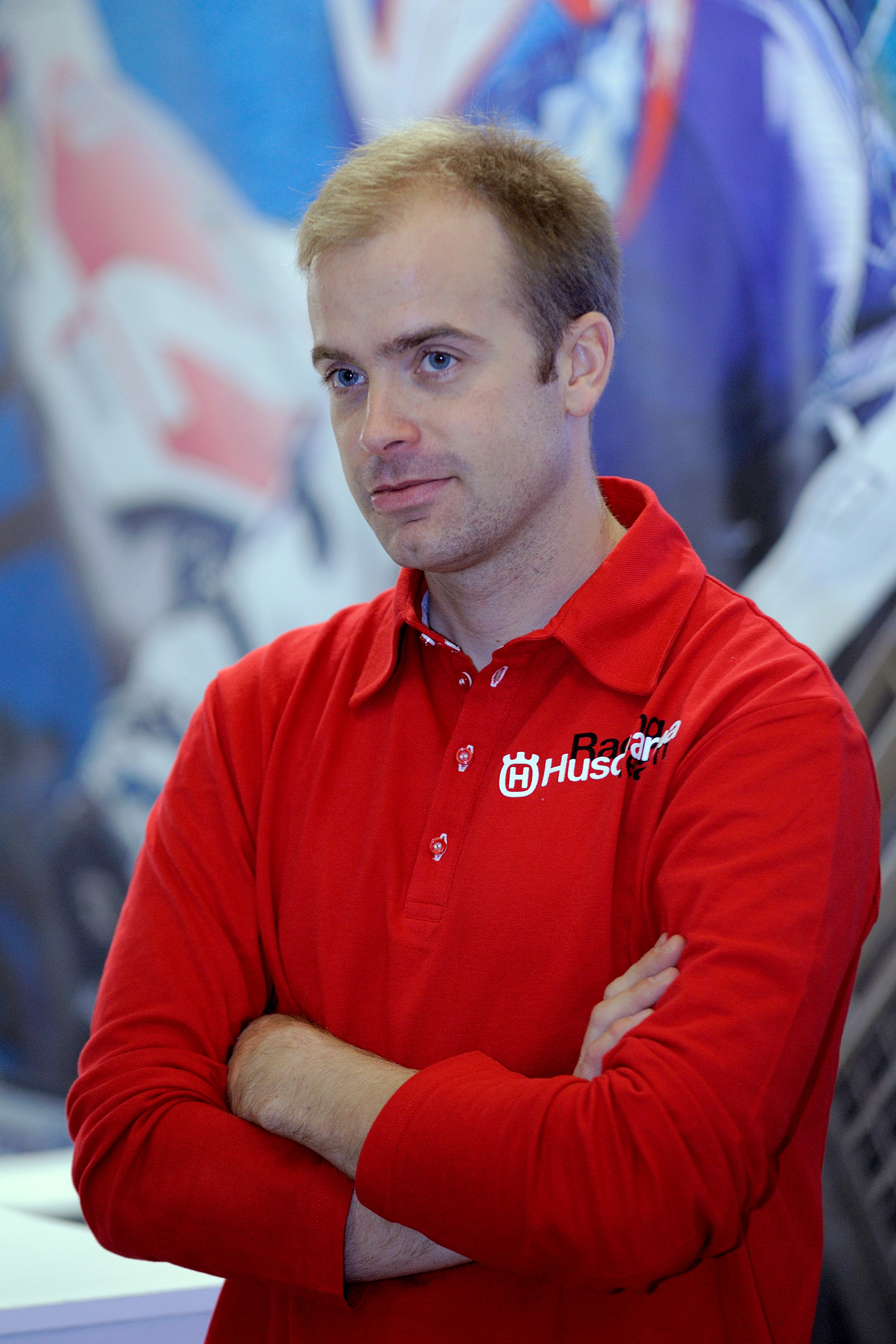
Salminen in January 2011.

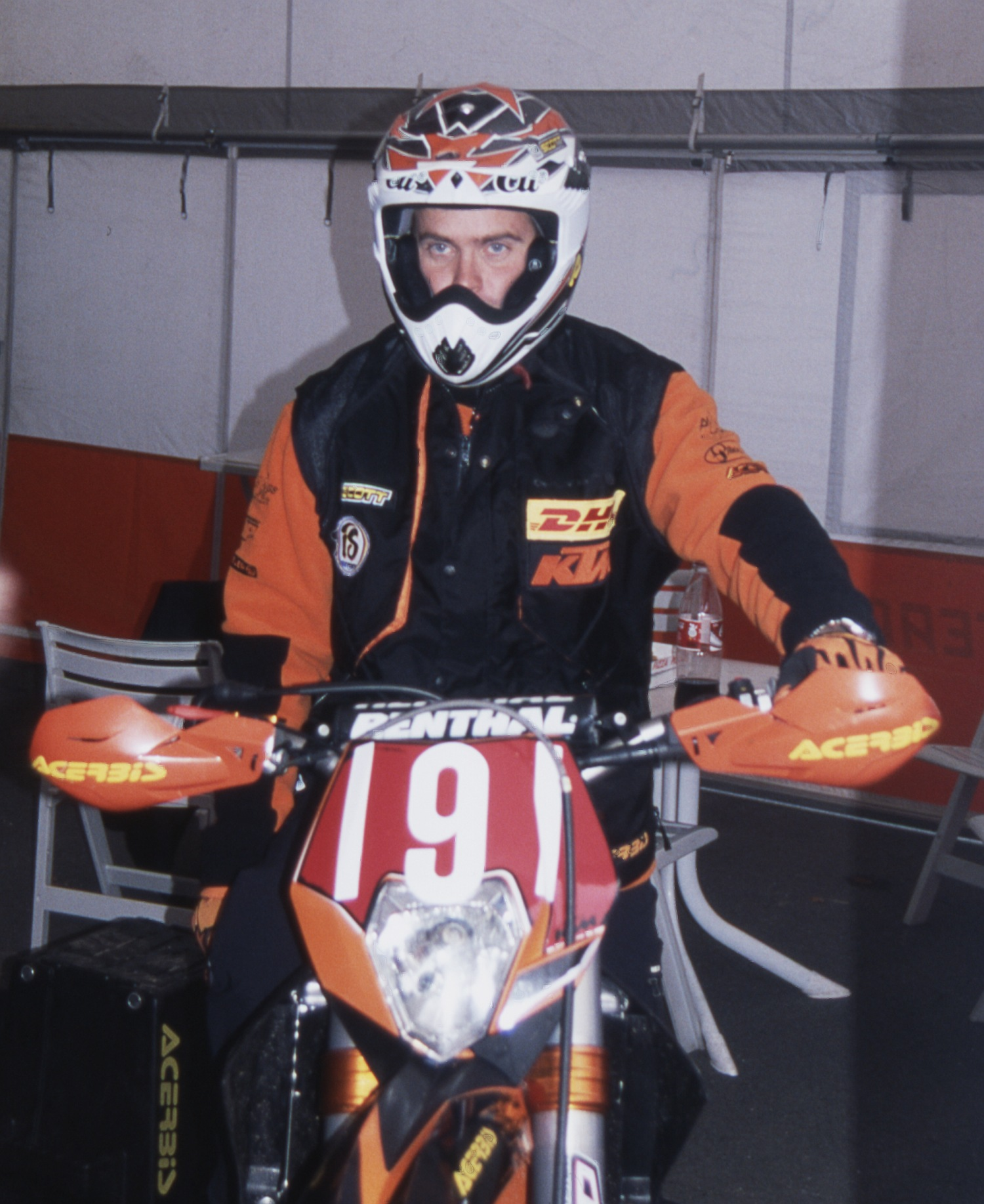
Salminen at the German enduro race Rund um Zschopau in 2007.

Juha Salminen (born 27 September 1976 in Vantaa) is a Finnish former professional motorcycle enduro racer. He is a 13-time World Enduro Champion (including the overall world championship titles from 2000 to 2004) and has also won the German championship (1998) and the Spanish championship (2000–2002).

Salminen also competed in motocross, where he won the Finnish championship in 2002, and endurocross, where he won four times the Barcelona Indoor Enduro in 2000, 2001, 2002 and 2004. In addition to his personal titles, Salminen is a six-time winner of the International Six Days Enduro (ISDE) World Trophy with Team Finland. In 2020, Salminen was named an FIM Enduro Legend.

== Racing career ==
Riding for KTM, Salminen won six world titles in a row from 1999 to 2004. After the 2004 season, he wanted a new challenge and moved to the United States to ride for KTM in the Grand National Cross Country series. He won nine of the series' thirteen races and became the GNCC champion in his debut year. He was crowned both "AMA Amateur Athlete of the Year" and "GNCC Rider of the Year", chosen by fellow competitors. In 2006, Salminen clinched his second GNCC title at the Yadkin Valley Stomp GNCC in Yadkinville, North Carolina.

Salminen returned to the World Enduro Championship for the 2007 season, with David Knight replacing him in the KTM factory team in the US. Salminen won the first twelve races of the season, but had to miss out the Slovakian rounds due to breaking his collarbone in a British championship race in Britain. He returned to race for the season-ending rounds in France and secured his 12th world title. In the 2008 season, Salminen won nine of the sixteen rounds and broke compatriot Kari Tiainen's record (77) for most wins in the world championship. However, a retirement in the first Spanish round proved costly for his title chase, and Yamaha's Johnny Aubert became the first man to beat Salminen to the title since the 1998 season.

For the 2009 season, Salminen signed a three-year contract with the new BMW factory team. As BMW withdrew from the championship after non-satisfactory results, Salminen moved to Husqvarna for 2011 and won a record eighth class title.

== Career summary ==
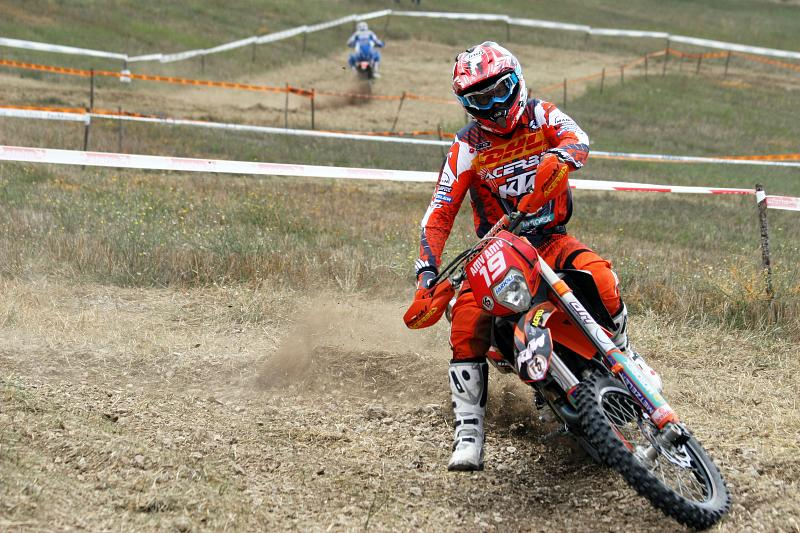
Salminen at the 2008 WEC GP of Italy.

Season	Series	Class	Team	Races	Wins	Final placing
1996	World Enduro Championship	125 cc	Husqvarna	6	0	13th
1997	World Enduro Championship	125 cc	Honda	8	0	7th
1998	World Enduro Championship	125 cc	KTM	14	2	3rd
1999	World Enduro Championship	125 cc	KTM	14	7	1st
2000	World Enduro Championship	125 cc	KTM	10	10	1st
2001	World Enduro Championship	250 cc	KTM	11	8	1st
2002	World Enduro Championship	400 cc	KTM	14	9	1st
2003	World Enduro Championship	500 cc	KTM	14	10	1st
2004	World Enduro Championship	E2	KTM	16	14	1st
2005	Grand National Cross Country	Bikes	KTM	13	9	1st
2006	Grand National Cross Country	Bikes	KTM	13	8	1st
2007	World Enduro Championship	E1	KTM	14	13	1st
2008	World Enduro Championship	E2	KTM	16	9	2nd
2009	World Enduro Championship	E2	BMW	16	2	2nd
2010	World Enduro Championship	E2	BMW	10	0	8th
2011	World Enduro Championship	E1	Husqvarna	16	10	1st

=== ISDE ===
Season	Location	Class	Team	Final placing
1995	Jelenia Góra, Poland	Junior Trophy	Finland	5th
1996	Hämeenlinna, Finland	Junior Trophy	Finland	1st
1997	Brescia, Italy	World Trophy	Finland	2nd
1998	Traralgon, Australia	World Trophy	Finland	1st
2000	Granada, Spain	World Trophy	Finland	18th
2001	Brive-la-Gaillarde, France	World Trophy	Finland	16th
2002	Jablonec nad Nisou, Czech Republic	World Trophy	Finland	1st
2003	Fortaleza, Brazil	World Trophy	Finland	1st
2004	Kielce, Poland	World Trophy	Finland	1st
2006	Taupō, New Zealand	World Trophy	Finland	1st
2007	La Serena, Chile	World Trophy	Finland	16th
2008	Serres, Greece	World Trophy	Finland	5th
2009	Figueira da Foz, Portugal	World Trophy	Finland	3rd
2010	Morelia, Mexico	World Trophy	Finland	3rd
2011	Kotka, Finland	World Trophy	Finland	1st
