= Johnny Aubert =

French motorcycle racer (born 1980)

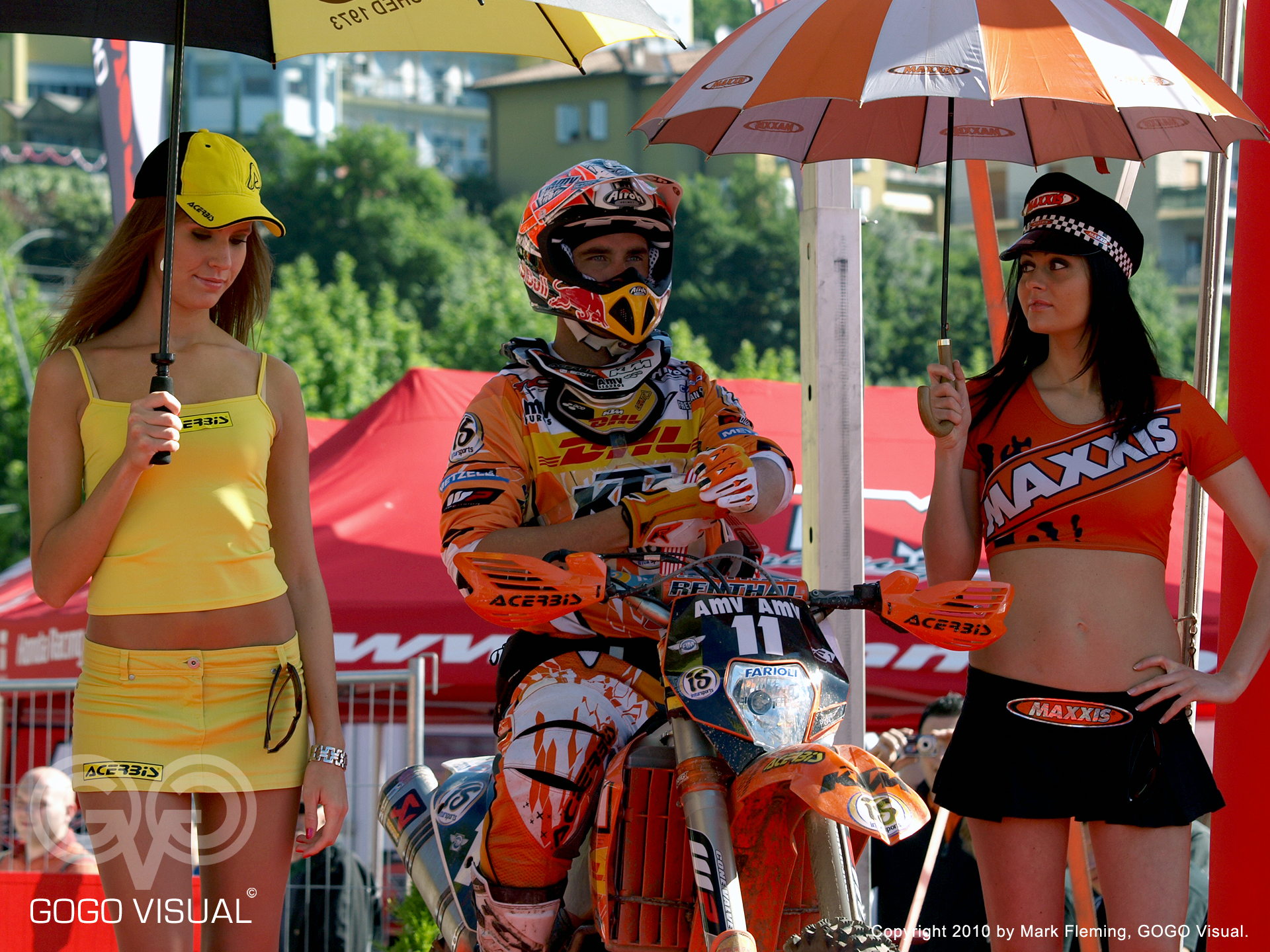
Aubert at the 2010 WEC GP of Italy

Johnny Aubert (born 31 May 1980) is a French enduro rider and two-time world-champion. A former motocross rider, Aubert debuted in the World Enduro Championship riding for Yamaha in 2006. He claimed the world championship in the E2 class in the 2008 season. After switching to KTM, he successfully defended his title in 2009. In 2010, Aubert won the International Six Days Enduro (ISDE) World Trophy with the French national team. He was the fastest rider overall in the competition in 2007 and 2010.

== Career summary ==
Season	Series	Class	Team	Wins	Final placing
1998	Motocross World Championship	125 cc	Kawasaki	0	22nd
1999	Motocross World Championship	125 cc	Husqvarna	0	15h
2000	Motocross World Championship	125 cc	Husqvarna	0	27th
2001	Motocross World Championship	250 cc	Yamaha	0	11th
2002	Motocross World Championship	250 cc	Yamaha	0	12th
2006	World Enduro Championship	E2	Yamaha	3	4th
2007	World Enduro Championship	E2	Yamaha	7	3rd
2008	World Enduro Championship	E2	Yamaha	5	1st
2009	World Enduro Championship	E2	KTM	13	1st
2010	World Enduro Championship	E1	KTM	4	2nd
2011	World Enduro Championship	E2	KTM	3	12th

=== ISDE ===
Season	Location	Class	Team	Final placing
2006	Taupō, New Zealand	World Trophy	France	2nd
2007	La Serena, Chile	World Trophy	France	2nd
2010	Morelia, Mexico	World Trophy	France	1st

=== Dakar Rally ===
Year	Class	Vehicle	Position	Stages won
2020	Bikes	(France) Sherco	DNF stage 6	0
