= Mrs Victor Bruce =

British record-breaking racing motorist, speedboat racer and aviator

The Hon. Mrs Victor Bruce
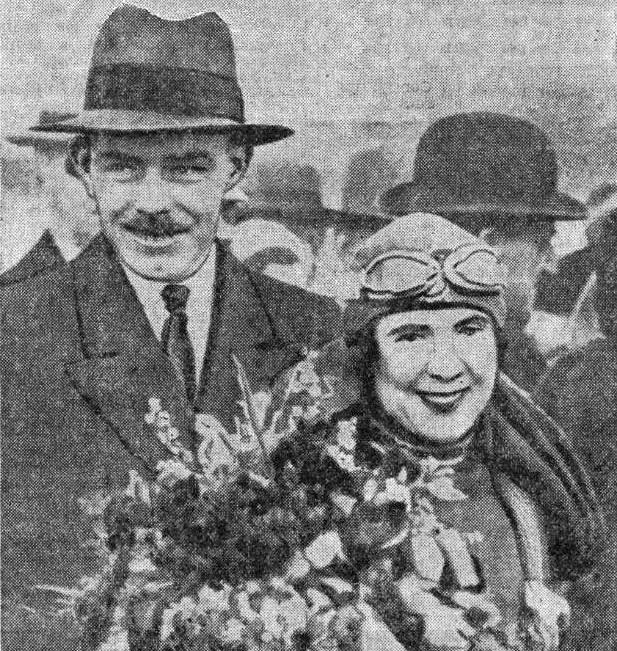
- Mr. and Mrs. Victor Bruce
- Born: Mildred Mary Petre; 10 November 1895; Chelmsford, Essex, England
- Died: 21 May 1990 (aged 94); Camden, London, England
- Occupations: Motorist, speedboat racer, aviator, businesswoman
- Known for: First woman to fly around the world (except oceans) solo
- Spouse: Victor Austin Bruce (m. 1926; div. 1941)
- Children: 1

Mildred Mary Petre (10 November 1895 – 21 May 1990) was a British record-breaking racing motorist, speedboat racer and aviator in the 1920s and 1930s, and later, successful businesswoman. Commonly referred to as Mrs Victor Bruce, she was also known in contemporary references as Mary Petre Bruce, Mildred Bruce, Mildred Mary Bruce and Mary Victor Bruce.

== Early life ==
Mildred Mary Petre was born at Coptfold Hall, Margaretting, Ingatestone, Chelmsford, Essex, England, on 10 November 1895, the daughter of Jennie Maginness (née Williams), a Shakespearean actress from Indiana and Lawrence Petre, a descendant of Sir William Petre. She had five brothers and was educated at the Convent of Notre Dame de Sion, in Bayswater, London.

Her childhood involved sailing, riding, and learning to ride a motorcycle, and drive a car. In 1911, aged 15, she began her passion for motor vehicles by riding her brother's Matchless motorcycle, travelling around Osterley, west London, with her collie dog Laddie in the sidecar, wearing a red bow on his collar to match those on her plaits. She was cited for a motoring offence and appeared in Hounslow police court, where the magistrate dismissed the charges, fined her court costs of 6 shillings, and banned her from riding the motorcycle until she was 16. In 1920, she purchased her first car, an Enfield-Allday, and was prosecuted many times for speeding, including three days running at Bow Street Magistrates' Court.

In 1920, her affair with wealthy landowner Stephen Easter (1874–1952) resulted in the birth of a son, originally named Anthony Billy Stephen Petre Easter, but she changed his name to Anthony Petre Easter-Bruce in 1933. In 1926, she married the Honourable Victor Austin Bruce, son of Henry Bruce, 2nd Baron Aberdare. He was a works driver for AC Cars Ltd., and won the 1926 Monte Carlo Rally in an AC car. She became known as The Hon. Mrs Victor Bruce and kept the name after she and her husband divorced in 1941. They had no children.

== Motor racing record breaking ==
Bruce borrowed an AC Six car (PF6465) from Selwyn Edge, and started the 1927 Monte Carlo Rally from John o' Groats. After travelling 1,700 miles (2,700 km) in 72 hours without sleeping, she finished sixth overall, and won the Coupe des Dames, for the women's class. On 28 January 1927, she departed Monte Carlo on an 8,000-mile (13,000 km) endurance trial through Italy, Sicily, Tunisia, Morocco, Spain, and France. She drove the car 1,000 miles (1,600 km) around the Montlhéry oval circuit near Paris, then finally returned to England. On 9 July 1927, she departed from London in the same car (PF6465), once again accompanied by her husband plus a journalist and an engineer. They drove through France, Belgium, the Netherlands, Germany, Denmark, Sweden, Finland, and finally planted a Union Jack about 250 miles (400 km) north of the Arctic Circle. It was farther north than anyone had previously driven, a record that remained unbroken until the 21st century.

On 9 December 1927, she and her husband, assisted by J. A. Joyce, started a 10-day endurance record in fog at Montlhéry, driving an AC Six fitted with a racing screen but minus roof, mudguards and lights. The average speed was 68 miles per hour (109 km/h) over about 15,000 miles (24,000 km). On 6 June 1929, she drove a Bentley 4½ Litre at Montlhéry for 24 hours, to capture the world record for single-handed driving, averaging over 89 miles per hour (143 km/h).

Bruce was a member of the London Ladies' Motor Club a motorcycle club for women based in London, founded in 1926/7 by racer and stunt rider Jessie Hole (later Jessie Ennis). The club president was Kathleen Pelham Burn (Countess of Drogheda), Betty Debenham was press secretary and other members included Nancy Debenham, Marjorie Cottle and Violette Cordery.

== Powerboats ==
In 1929, Bruce purchased an outboard speedboat, named it Mosquito, and raced it at events at the Welsh Harp reservoir. On 15 September 1929, she steered the boat from Dover across the English Channel to Calais, then decided to make it a non-stop double crossing back to Dover. The record-breaking round trip took 1 hour 47 minutes, and the manufacturer gave her a new boat to replace Mosquito that had almost destroyed itself. In October 1929, she borrowed a 23-foot boat named British Power Boats, and broke the 24-hour distance record by travelling 694 nautical miles (1,285 km; 799 mi) on a course around a lightship and a yacht moored in the Solent.

== Flying exploits ==
=== Round-the-world flight ===
Having set records on land and water, Bruce looked to the skies. As early as 1928 she joined the Mayfair Flying Club and by January 1930 was the owner of a Gipsy Moth. She did not take her first flying lesson until 25 May 1930, the day after Amy Johnson completed her record-setting flight to Australia. Bruce learned to fly at the Brooklands School of Flying; her instructors were G. E. Lowdell and Capt. H. Duncan Davis. Bruce soloed on 22 June 1930 and received her A-Licence #2855 on 26 July.

She purchased a Blackburn Bluebird IV (registered 'G-ABDS') with a de Havilland Gipsy II engine from Auto-Auctions Ltd. in Burlington Gardens, London, in July 1930. It was sent to the Blackburn factory in Brough, East Yorkshire, for modifications in preparation for an attempt to fly solo around the world.

In her 1931 work The Bluebird's Flight, Bruce claimed she had been in an aeroplane only once prior to purchasing the Bluebird and that she did not care for flying. She went on to claim she made the purchase, commenced training, went solo (in six days) and was licensed all within that same month of July 1930.

On 25 September 1930, she named the aircraft Bluebird and took off from Heston Aerodrome. She flew east with stops in Germany, Austria, Yugoslavia, Turkey, Syria and Iraq. An oil leak caused a forced landing on the shore of the Persian Gulf, where she was sheltered for two days by Baluchi tribesmen before a British rescue party reached her. After a delay of several days for repairs, she flew on to India, Burma, Siam (Thailand), and French Indo-China (Vietnam). Torrential monsoon rains forced a landing in a jungle clearing beside the Mekong River; she contracted malaria and her flight was further delayed. She flew on to Hanoi, Hong Kong, Shanghai, and Seoul, making the first flight across the Yellow Sea. On 24 November 1930, having covered 10,330 miles (16,620 km) in 25 flying days, she reached Tokyo. She crossed the Pacific aboard the Empress of Japan to Vancouver.

On her flight across North America an undercarriage failure on landing at Medford, Oregon caused extensive damage, and meant a delay of another week. She reached her announced destination of her mother's birthplace, New Albany, Indiana, by way of San Francisco, San Diego, St. Louis and Chicago. A one-week delay followed a crash on takeoff from Baltimore, and she finally reached New York City in early February 1931. She sailed on the Île de France to Le Havre, and on 19 February 1931 flew to Lympne Airport, having flown about 19,000 miles (31,000 km). On 20 February 1931, she was given an aerial escort by Amy Johnson, Winifred Spooner and others to Croydon Airport, where a reception of press and celebrities awaited her. She was the first person to fly from England to Japan, the first to fly across the Yellow Sea, and the first woman to fly around the world alone (crossing the oceans by ship).

=== Air-to-air refuelling ===
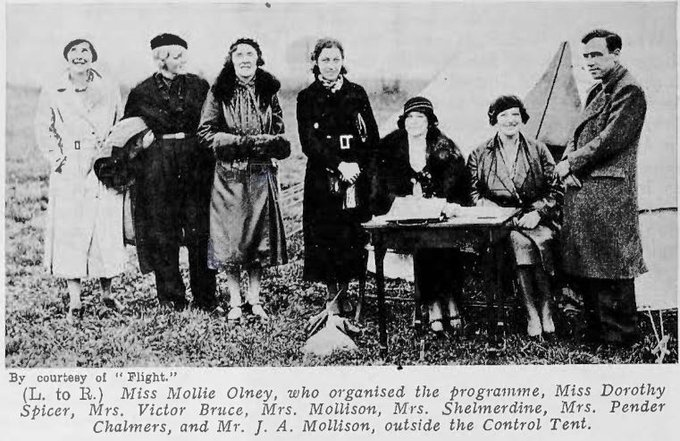
Mollie Olney, Dorothy Spicer, Mrs Victor Bruce, Amy Johnson, Lady Lillian Shelmerdine, Mrs Pender Chalmers & Jim Mollison at Atlantic Park Southampton in 1932.

In July 1932, Bruce purchased a Saro Windhover amphibious aircraft (G-ABJP), named it City of Portsmouth, and had the undercarriage temporarily removed. She also purchased a Bristol F.2 (G-ACXA), and had it converted as a refuelling tanker. During August 1932, over the Solent, she used the two aircraft in three failed attempts to break the world flight-refuelled endurance record by flying non-stop for four weeks. Her co-pilot was Flt. Lt. John B. W. Pugh, AFC, later employed by Luxury Air Tours and Air Dispatch.

=== Flying circus ===
In early 1933, she was invited to join the British Hospital Air Pageants flying circus, and purchased the sole Miles Satyr (G-ABVG) in the name of her company Luxury Air Tours Ltd., for use in aerobatic displays. She also purchased a Fairey Fox (G-ACAS) from a scrapyard for £2 10s, plus £10 for an engine, then had it modified at Hanworth Aerodrome for passenger-carrying duties. She then trained and qualified for her commercial pilot's 'B' licence. The Fox crashed in July 1933, and she left the flying circus.

=== Cape Town autogiro attempt ===
On 25 November 1934, Bruce took off from Lympne Airport in a Cierva C.30A autogiro (G-ACVX), headed for Cape Town, in an attempt on the record for the longest autogiro flight, but the aircraft was damaged at Nîmes in France after 610 miles (980 km).

== Commercial aviation 1934–1936 ==
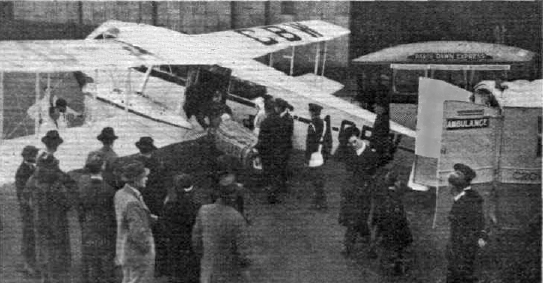
De Havilland DH.84 Dragon (G-ACBW) of Air Dispatch, 1935. Published caption: "Being Ill In Comfort: The Croydon demonstration of the D.H. Dragon which .... has been specially fitted up for permanent civil ambulance work by Air Dispatch Ltd."

On 7 August 1934, Bruce founded Commercial Air Hire Ltd., that immediately started newspaper delivery flights between Croydon and Paris, using two DH.84 Dragons. In 1935, Air Dispatch Ltd., that she had founded on 9 July 1934, started operating weekend freight (later also passenger) services from its base at Croydon Airport to Le Touquet and Le Bourget, Paris. In April, Commercial Air Hire started passenger shuttle services between Croydon and Heston airports, under the name Inner Circle Air Lines, using GAL Monospar ST-4s. The same year, Commercial Air Hire purchased an Avro 642 Eighteen 16-seat airliner (G-ACFV) for newspaper delivery contracts, and Air Dispatch shared its use for bullion-carrying, excursions, joy-riding flights and scheduled passenger services, until mid-1936. She was co-managing director, with Eric E. Noddings, of both closely linked companies, that were merged in 1936 as Air Dispatch Ltd. During this period, the combined fleets of Air Dispatch and Commercial Air Hire, plus those of associated companies International Air Freight Ltd. and Anglo European Airways, included GAL Monospar ST-4s, DH.84 Dragons, DH.89 Dragon Rapides, DH.90 Dragonflies, Airspeed AS.6 Envoys, plus other aircraft on lease, such as an Avro 618 Ten.

In late 1936, she sold two of the DH.84 Dragons for a large amount of cash to a mystery man, and they were covertly exported for use in the Spanish Civil War. From 1936, Commercial Air Hire operated many of its DH.84 Dragons on Territorial Army co-operation exercises under contract to the British Army, involving night flying and searchlights.

== Show jumping ==
In about 1938, Bruce renewed her childhood interest in horses, and purchased a show jumper named Grand Manor. She rode him in shows at Olympia and Windsor.

== World War II ==
On the outbreak of war on 3 September 1939, Air Dispatch moved with its fleets to Cardiff Municipal Airport, where, until April 1940, they operated under the control of the government's National Air Communications. Subsequently, as part of the Civilian Repair Organisation, Air Dispatch rebuilt damaged RAF aircraft wings and whole aircraft at Cardiff, eventually employing about 700 people.

In 1945, the company attempted to return to commercial air services, but was thwarted by the dominance of the nationalised airlines. Air Dispatch turned to repair and then manufacture of bus and trolley bodies, changing its name in 1947 to Air Dispatch (Coachbuilders) Ltd. In 1948, under the management of Mrs. Bruce's son Anthony, the company was renamed Bruce Coach Works Ltd., and continued until its closure in 1952. Mrs Bruce's fortunes subsequently increased further via property investments.

== Later life ==
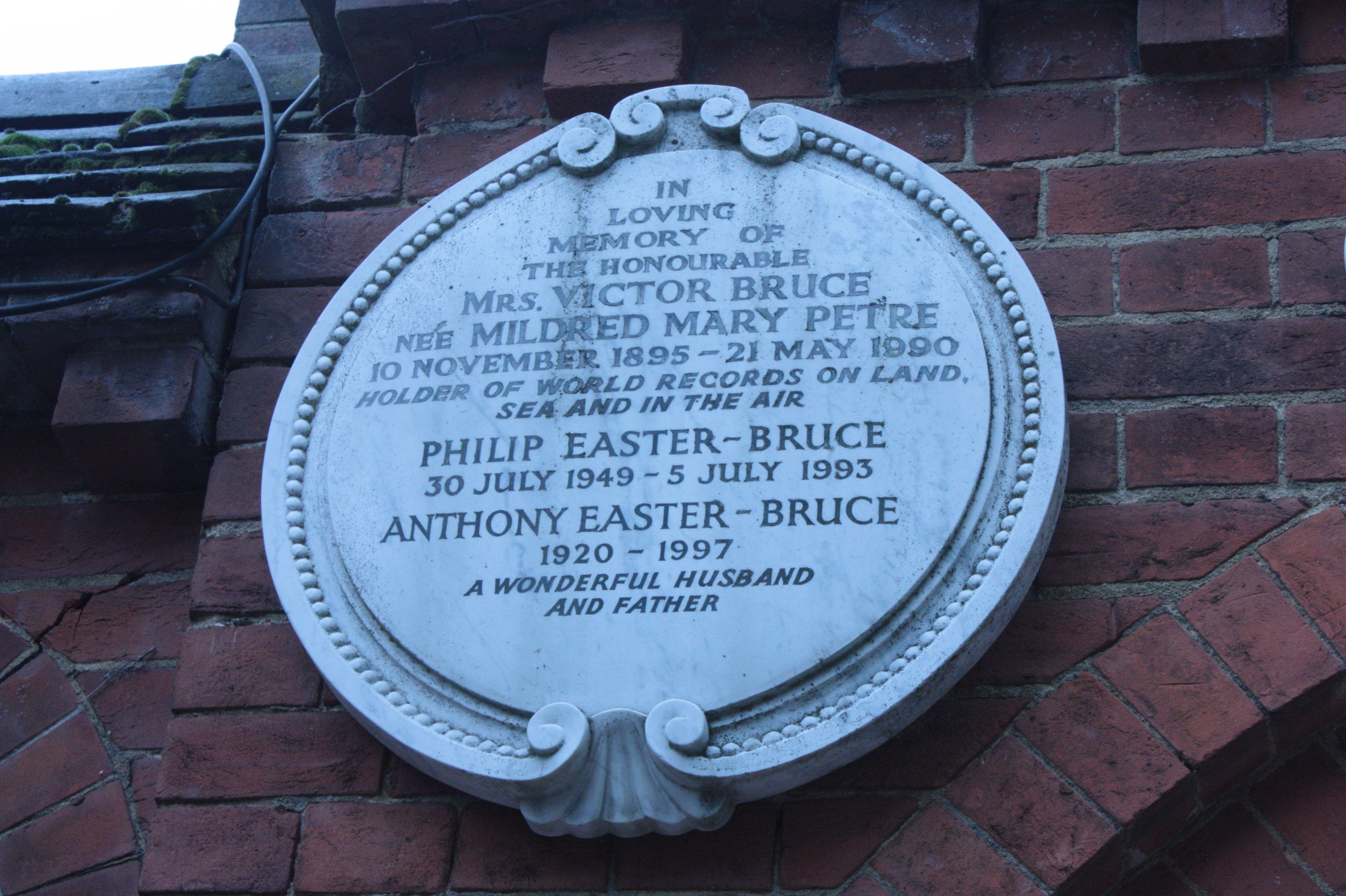
Memorial to the Hon. Mrs Victor Bruce, Golders Green Crematorium

In April 1974, at age 78, Bruce test-drove a Ford Capri Ghia at 110 miles per hour (180 km/h) at Thruxton circuit. At age 81, after a brief refresher course in flying, she performed a loop in a De Havilland Chipmunk. She died on 21 May 1990, at age 94 and was cremated at Golders Green Crematorium in London, where a memorial plaque was installed.

Bruce was survived by her son, Anthony Easter-Bruce (1920–1997) and one grandson, Michael Easter-Bruce (born 1952).

== Commemoration ==
The Oxford Dictionary of National Biography published an entry for her in 2004.

British television presenter Carol Vorderman named her plane 'Mildred' after Bruce, calling her "my heroine [and]... one of the most incredible women of the last century".

== Publications ==
- Bruce, The Hon. Mrs Victor (1927). Nine Thousand Miles in Eight Weeks: Being an Account of an Epic Journey by Motor-Car through Eleven Countries and Two Continents. Heath Cranton Limited.
- — (1928). The Woman Owner-Driver: Collection of 14 essays on motoring for women. Iliffe and Sons.
- — (1928). "Where Evening Joins the Dawn (An account of her drive north of the Arctic Circle)". The Oxford Annual for Girls, Tenth Year. Humphrey Milford; Oxford University Press: 9ff.
- — (1930). The Peregrinations of Penelope, with 40 drawings by Joyce Dennys. Heath Cranton Limited.
- — (1931). The Bluebird's Flight. Chapman & Hall Ltd.
- — (1977). Nine Lives Plus: Record Breaking on Land, Sea and in the Air: an autobiographical account. Pelham Books.

== See also ==
- List of defunct airlines of the United Kingdom
