= Marjorie Cottle =

British motorcycle racer

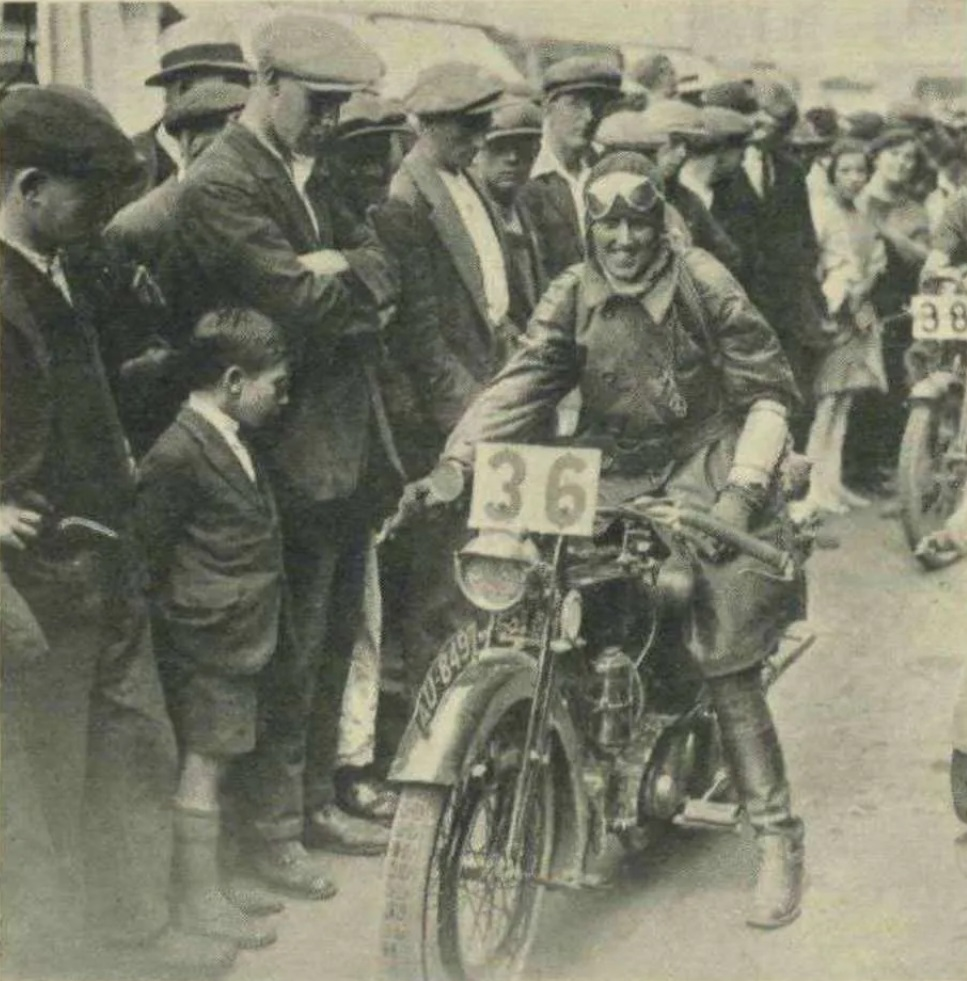
- Cottle at the 1925 International Six Days Trial
- Born: 5 September 1900
- Died: 17 July 1987 (aged 86)
- Other name: Mrs Watson-Bourne
- Occupation: Motorcycle Rider
- Known for: Winning 1927 ISDT Silver Vase and many other awards. She promoted motorcycling worldwide, particularly encouraging women to get involved.

Marjorie Cottle (5 September 1900 – 17 July 1987) was an English works supported motorcycle trials rider. She was one of Britain's best-known motorcyclists in the 1920s and 1930s. She competed regularly in reliability trials and was considered to be one of the best riders in the country, male or female. Her greatest success was the International Six Days Trial of 1927, in which the British Ladies' Team won the International Silver Vase. That year the trial was held in the Lake District, and attracted a large number of competitors. She was described as the "most famous girl rider in the world".

== Early life ==
Marjorie Cottle was born in Seacombe, Wallasey, Cheshire, on 5 September 1900 to Emily and William Cottle. She had a younger sister Eileen, and her father William, a manage of a confectionary factory was a keen motorcyclist. As soon as she could legally ride, at the age of 14, she persuaded her father to let her have a motorcycle. He acquired a pre World War 1 Premier from a scrapyard and Marjorie had to rebuild it before she could ride it. When she had proved her ability to ride and keep the motorcycle running her father gave her a Calthorpe which she later sold at profit in order to buy an ex WD Triumph 500 cc.

== Motorcycling ==
The Triumph was then used in a hill climb held by the Liverpool MCC. As the only female entrant and one of only two people out of 300 entrants to succeed in reaching the top of the hill she gained a lot of publicity. She rode in her first motorcycle trial in 1920, the Blake Amateur Trial. After winning a gold medal in the North Wales Open Trial a motorcycle manufacturer in Wrexham, Powell, gave her a works supported machine. She later had works support from Raleigh, BSA and Triumph. Works support ranged from a specially prepared new machine along with some financial support to a small discount on spares. British motorcycles were exported worldwide, and many were marketed on competition success. Therefore, the riders as well as the makes became famous.

== Raleigh ==
Marjorie first rode a Raleigh in a 24-hour trial from Birkenhead to Aberystwyth. It is unclear whether she was works supported by Raleigh for that event but it is likely as the machine was delivered to her by Hugh Gibson who was a famous rider and Raleigh's competition manager. She had no chance to familiarise herself with the motorcycle before starting the trial.

Hugh Gibson planned to ride round the coast of Great Britain on a 7 hp, 798 cc Raleigh and sidecar. It was deemed an impossible task as some of the roads were of poor quality and the reliability of motorcycles was not as good as they are now. It was to be the longest ACU observed test ever. Marjorie announced that "What man can do, woman can do" and that she would ride the same route at the same time but in the opposite direction so as not to interfere with the official test. She rode a 2 3/4 hp (348 cc) Raleigh. They both completed 3,429 miles, averaging 300 miles a day in 11 days and 10 hours on 12 June 1924. The ride started and finished in Liverpool. In 1984 Ken Hallworth, a Raleigh owner and friend of Marjorie recreated the trip on his own Raleigh.

From 5 to 15 July 1926 Marjorie undertook a 1,400-mile promotional ride on a 174 cc Raleigh. The object was to show how suitable the motorcycle is for female riders. Her route spelt out the word Raleigh in cursive script on a map of the UK. The first leg from London to Southampton was the upright (back) of the letter R. The finish, the bottom of the second down-stroke of the h, was in Edinburgh. It was a well publicised journey. Raleigh's adverts featured a similar machine which was to be awarded to whoever guessed correctly (or nearest to) the number of towns and villages that she passed through. One retailer's journal, The Garage and Motor Agent, was particularly enthusiastic about Miss Cottle's promotional activities on behalf of the motorcycle industry. She was, it declared, "undoubtedly one of the trade's most useful propagandists." Not only did she demonstrate that physical strength was not crucial for operating a motorcycle, but this magazine was especially impressed with "the fact that Miss Cottle always manages to look nice when engaged in her exploits, and not the least like a professional motor cyclist." In that way she "produces the best possible impression on the public" (Jones 532).

== Marriage ==
Cottle married Jack Watson-Bourne, who was a well-known trials rider, on 5 January 1927 at CerrigyDruidon in North Wales. Even after the marriage she was always referred to as Miss Cottle in press reports.

== International Six Days Trial (ISDT) ==
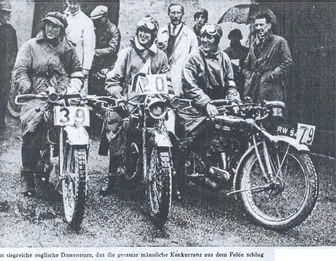
Cottle (#39) at the 1927 trial with teammates Louie McLean (#20), and Edyth Foley (#79)

She rode in the International Six Days Trial every year from 1925 to 1939 inclusive. The Auto Cycle Union selected female riders Marjorie Cottle, Louie McLean and Edyth Foley as British B squad for the International Six Days Trial (ISDT) in August 1927 as they had done the year before. The News of the World carried a picture of Cottle, Edyth Foley, Louie McLean and two other leading female motorcyclists, Mrs M Grenfell and Mrs Spokes. The five were described as "the British ladies who triumphed in the International Trials" on 20 August. This was the International Six Days' Trial of 1927, in which the British Ladies' Team won the International Silver Vase. The trials were held in the Lake District, and attracted a large number of competitor.

ISDT
year	where	no	machine	award	other women
1925	Wales	36	Raleigh	Gold medal	2
1926	England	24	Raleigh 348 cc	Gold medal and 3rd in Silver Vase	6
1927	England	39	Raleigh 348 cc	Gold medal and Silver Vase	4
1928	England	26	Raleigh 348 cc	Gold medal	5
1929	Germany	113	Raleigh 348 cc	Silver medal	7
1930	France	38	BSA	Gold medal	5
1931	Italy	78	BSA 500 cc	Gold medal	3
1932	Italy	19	BSA 250 cc	Gold medal	1
1933	Wales	94	BSA 250 cc	Silver medal	1
1934	Germany	80	BSA 250 cc	Gold medal	3
1935	Germany	197	BSA 348 cc	retired	3
1936	Germany		BSA 348 cc	retired	0
1937	Wales and England	25	BSA 250	Bronze medal	1
1938	Wales		Triumph 249 cc	Silver medal	1
1939	Austria	255	Triumph 249 cc	retired	1

Details above taken from various issues of The Motor Cycle and Motorcycling magazines.

- 1935 retired on 5th day due to marshal using concrete dust to extinguish a carburettor fire and thus preventing the engine from restarting
- 1936 retired due to seized big end on the final day.
- 1939 It was held in the last few days before England declared war on Germany. That year, Britain sent both a civilian and a military team to compete. After four days, when it seemed that war could break out at any minute, British officials told the civilian team to return to England immediately. Cottle refused to leave because she thought it was just gossip and as she had such a fine bike it seemed daft to give up, She competed on the fifth day alongside the British Army team. When they too were ordered to abandon competition, Cottle and the Army team rode their motorcycles to neutral territory in Switzerland.

== Scottish Six Days Trial (SSDT) ==
The Scottish Six Days like the International Six Days Trial is an extreme test of both rider and machine. A set number of miles are completed each day. It includes observed tests over tricky off-road sections and some road riding between sections. Cottle competed in the SSDT every year from 1923 to 1939. In the 1923 event, she was the only female rider. She won a gold medal and a special award from Raleigh for "her perseverance, endurance and expert riding ability in the most severe and difficult trial ever recorded". She won quite a few other Gold medals and awards over the years. Since then a number of women riders including Mary Driver in the sixties, Maria Conway and Katy Sunter have competed in this event.

== Women and motorcycling ==
By 1926, there were so many women participating in various races and trials throughout Britain that the Motor Cycle Manufacturers' Union, the industry's trade organisation, decided to honour some of the more prominent ones with a special banquet in London. The occasion was well publicised, not only in the mainstream press but also in motor cycle publications and even women's magazines such as Home Notes.

Cottle won the prize for the best performance by a "lady rider" in the 1927 Scott Trial. She was the only woman to complete the course. After competing in the famous Scott Trials, the magazine 'The Motor Cycle' had to admit she had successfully finished the grueling course "while burly men had given up from sheer exhaustion".

The fact that Cottle was often the only female entrant and very successful meant she often featured in daily newspapers, motorcycle magazines and general publications. Her riding skill and expertise were regularly praised such as "rode better than any mere man could hope to". At least one editor specifically said the Marjorie was judged not just for doing well as a woman but for riding better than most of the men. Marjorie also gained a lot of press attention and photographs because of her appearance and the importance she placed on it. Many event reports included comments like "smiling as happily as ever" or on how smart she looked when her fellow riders were disheveled and muddy. Marjorie wrote articles for various publications extolling the benefits of motorcycling and how to look smart whilst doing it. She wrote about how women riders are finding motorcycling is healthy and good for the complexion. She described herself as a fanatic about women motorcyclist doing themselves justice. She was concerned that all riders face prejudice, but females faced the most. Her advice was to never let yourself be photographed using the wrong spanner or donning make up whilst sat on the motorcycle or of being untidy and dirty. This was also extended to male riders. She was clear that you got filthy riding trials but you cleaned yourself up as much as possible before going into a bar or other public area.

On one occasion Cottle rode to Holyhead and got on a ferry. She arrived in Dublin at 4pm. The 5am start of the End to End Ireland regularity Trial was 250 miles away in County Cork. so she rode there and arrived with two hours to spare before riding the 260 miles of the first day of the trial.

Cottle was a member of the London Ladies' Motor Club a motorcycle club for women based in London, founded in 1926/7 by racer and stunt rider Jessie Hole (later Jessie Ennis). The club president was Kathleen Pelham Burn (Countess of Drogheda), Betty Debenham was press secretary and other members included Nancy Debenham, Violette Cordery and Mrs Victor Bruce.

== World War II ==
By 1940, Cottle was using her trials Triumph to ride as a Home Guard despatch rider. She was Group officer in the National Fire Service in charge of DR training in North Wales. She had also assisted her husband, Jack, who trained military despatch riders at 2nd Signals Training centre, Prestatyn, North Wales before his death in March 1943.

== Later life and legacy ==
According to Koerner: For several years after she gave up competing, she was employed by the BSA company as one of their motor cycle sales representatives although she seems to have been kept in the showrooms not where she wanted to be, out on the road or riding in competition events. She became very involved with the Vintage Motor Cycle Club attending meetings, giving talks and prizes as well as sitting on the Brains Trust panel, She did drive cars in car trials. She was interviewed and filmed riding a BSA Bantam by the BBC in 1968

Cottle died on 17 July 1987 in Chester hospital after a short illness. She left her trophy collection to a friend, on whose death it was put up for auction at Bonhams in 2010.
