= Dorothy Spicer =

Aviator and aeronautical engineer

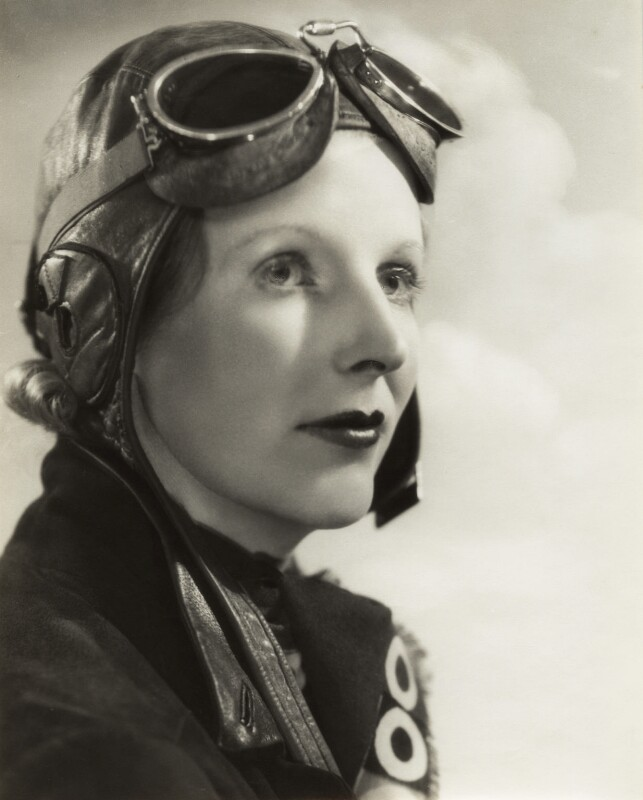
- Spicer in 1938
- Born: Dorothy Spicer; 31 July 1908; Hadley Wood, Middlesex, England
- Died: 23 December 1946 (aged 38); Argentina
- Spouse: Richard Pearse
- Children: Patricia Mary Pearse
- Parent(s): Norman Spicer, Hilda Mary Sisterson

Dorothy Norman Pearse née Spicer (31 July 1908 – 23 December 1946) was an English aviator, and the first woman to gain an advanced qualification in aeronautical engineering.

== Early life ==
Dorothy Spicer was born on 31 July 1908 at Hadley Wood, Middlesex, the only daughter of Hilda Mary Sisterson and stockbroker Norman Spicer (d. 1936). She attended the Godolphin School in Salisbury, Wiltshire and studied at University College, London.

== Career ==

Spicer learned to fly in 1929 at the London Aeroplane Club at Stag Lane Aerodrome. Here she met Pauline Gower who was studying for her commercial pilot's licence and who became her friend.

In 1931, they started a business together. Gower was licensed to carry passengers for 'hire or reward', and Spicer was qualified as a ground engineer and held an 'A' (private) pilot's licence. They hired a plane and later bought a Gypsy Moth for the business, but struggled to make a living so decided to join the Crimson Fleet air circus and later the British Hospitals' air pageant. Spicer had joined the Women's Engineering Society (WES) in 1932 in their Aeronautical Section, and is described as Ground Engineer to Miss Gower. The WES Journal The Woman Engineer for June 1933 records that Spicer and Gower were 'touring the country with a "circus" which is giving air pageants in two hundred towns this summer in aid of British Hospitals'.

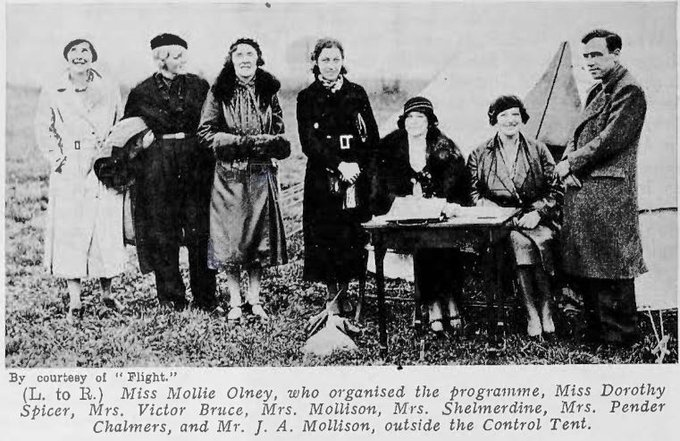
Mollie Olney, Dorothy Spicer, Mrs Victor Bruce, Amy Johnson, Lady Lillian Shelmerdine, Mrs Pender Chalmers & Jim Mollison at Atlantic Park Southampton in 1932.

Spicer studied for the Ground Engineers' (AME)'B' licence during this time, despite the fact that institutions offering advanced courses were restricted to men. She persuaded the manufacturers of the Spartan plane she and Gower flew in the circus to allow her to undertake the necessary practical and theoretical training at their workshops and earned her Ground Engineers' 'B' licence, becoming the first woman in the world to do so. She also held a Ground Engineers' 'C' licence, the second British woman to achieve this (her friend and fellow pilot Amy Johnson was the first) and became the first woman to achieve a Ground Engineers' 'D' licence in 1935.

Women were not usually allowed to study at such an advanced level and it took Air Vice-Marshal A. E. Borton to persuade Sir Harold Snagge, chairman of the Napier engineering company, to make special arrangements. The 'D' licence authorised her to inspect, pass out, and repair both engines and airframes, being qualified to build all aspects of an aircraft, airframe, and engine from scratch, and to approve the materials required for the work.

In a speech in 1937, Amy Johnson teased Dorothy: "amidst much laughter she then called upon Miss Spicer to admit or deny the report that she held every licence that it was possible to hold".

In September 1937, at the Women's Engineering Society conference, Spicer read a paper on the "Selection and Treatment of Steels for Aero-Engines".

In 1938 she accepted a position with the Air Registration Board in London, becoming the first woman in the British Empire to receive a technical appointment in civil aviation. The same year she and Pauline Gower jointly authored a book "Women with Wings", recounting their experiences flying together.

In late 1940, Dorothy took on flying work as an air observer and research assistant with the Royal Aircraft Establishment, Farnborough, and became involved in the development of a variety of new aircraft types and items of equipment.

== Personal life ==
On 2 March 1938, she became engaged to Flight Lieutenant Richard Pearse. They married on 26 April 1938 at Holy Trinity Brompton with Pauline Gower as chief bridesmaid. Their only child, Patricia Mary, was born at Farnham Common in Surrey in May 1939.

The Second World War broke out shortly after Patricia Mary's birth. In late 1940 Dorothy Pearse took on flying work as an air observer and research assistant at Royal Aircraft Establishment, Farnborough. She was involved in the development of a number of new aircraft and equipment. Her husband worked as a test pilot at the same organisation.

After the war, her husband Richard became South American representative of British Aviation Services in Rio de Janeiro. On 23 December 1946, the couple caught a flight to Rio de Janeiro but bad weather caused the plane to fly into a mountainside, killing all on board. A memorial service for Dorothy and Richard Pearse was held at All Saints' Church, St John's Wood on 8 January 1947. Their daughter went on to be a racing driver under the name Pat Sonnenschein.
