= Maysie Chalmers =

British engineer, aviator, actress (1894–1982)

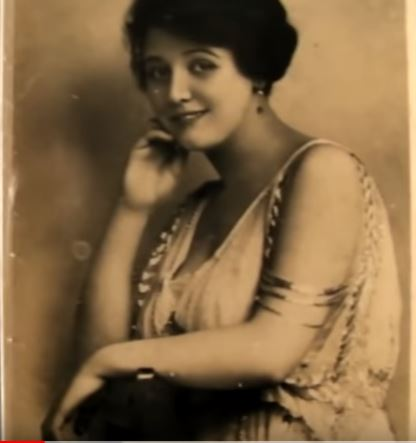
- Cigarette card during her stage career as Maysie Burlingham, April 1915
- Born: Edith May Burlingham; 13 March 1894; Hawarden, Flintshire, Wales
- Died: 29 July 1982 (aged 87); Lyme Regis, Dorset, England
- Other names: Maysie Burlingham; Mrs Pender Chalmers; Mrs Frank Forrest; Maysie Forrest; Edith May Forrest
- Education: The Queen's School, Chester
- Occupations: Actor, engineer, aircraft pilot
- Spouses: John William Pender Chalmers; Frank Forrest

Maysie Chalmers (13 March 1894 – 29 July 1982, née Burlingham), also known as Mrs Pender Chalmers, was a British electrical engineer and designer, and an aviator who competed in flying races, after an early career as an actress. In the 1920s and 1930s, she was a leading figure in the Electrical Association for Women, serving as vice chairman. In 1936, she became the first art adviser in electrical lighting to be appointed in the United Kingdom. She was known as Mrs Frank Forrest after remarrying in 1937.

== Early life ==
She was born Edith May Burlingham on 13 March 1894 in Hawarden, North Wales, the only child of Edith (née Rowlands) and Daniel Catlin Burlingham, a doctor, who were Quakers. She was later baptised on 5 April 1896 in Hawarden parish. She was educated at Queens School, Chester. After her father's death in 1912, she moved to London.

== Acting career ==
Burlingham toured with the Lewis Waller Players as Maysie Burlingham. In 1915, her performances included standing in for Evelyn D'Alroy in the Three Musketeers at the King's Theatre, Glasgow and on tour, and appearing in Gamblers All at the Wyndham's Theatre in London's West End. She is also mentioned as playing in The Other Side of Life in "The Stage" Year Book, 1915. A few months prior to her first marriage, her photo appeared on a cigarette card.

== Engineering career ==
During the First World War, she took a correspondence course in engineering. She was a specialist in decorative lighting and frequently worked with famous artists. She was director of Electric Super-Service Co. Ltd. She set up an electrical showroom in the Brompton Road, London and gave a tour to members of the Electrical Association for Women in 1932.

She was involved with the Home Workers' Campaign, organised by the Electrical Association for Women, which promoted the use of electricity in the home, and tried to raise the status of domestic service. Classes were organised in Derby by the Electrical Association for Women for those in domestic service, which Mrs Pender Chalmers took part in. In order to help achieve these aims she campaigned for the price of electricity to be reduced, especially for poorer households. She also promoted the use of electricity in factories in order to improve air quality. She often spoke at meetings of the Electrical Association for Women, which had 7,000 members in 20 branches in 1936.

In 1937 she was appointed as the first lighting art advisor to the British Thomson-Houston company, which was a subsidiary of the General Electric company. This role included travelling the country advising electrical companies and consumers on electric lighting.

== Flying ==
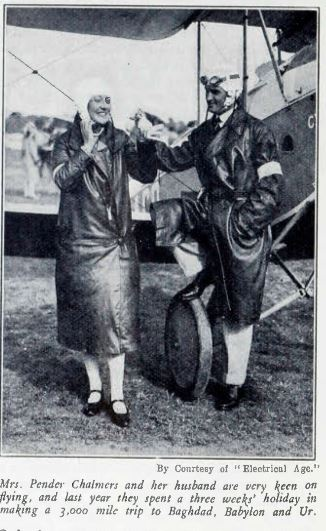

In 1930, Maysie Chalmers and her first husband went on a 10-day flying tour across Europe, with 21 other aeroplanes. They both enjoyed flying, and in 1932 made a 3,000 mile trip to Baghdad, Babylon and Ur. In 1932, she wrote an article in the Woman Engineer, the journal of the Women's Engineering Society, on "Aeronautical Training for Women". An earlier article in The Woman Engineer noted that Chalmers had completed a course on "Maintenance of Aircraft" at the London Aeroplane Club.

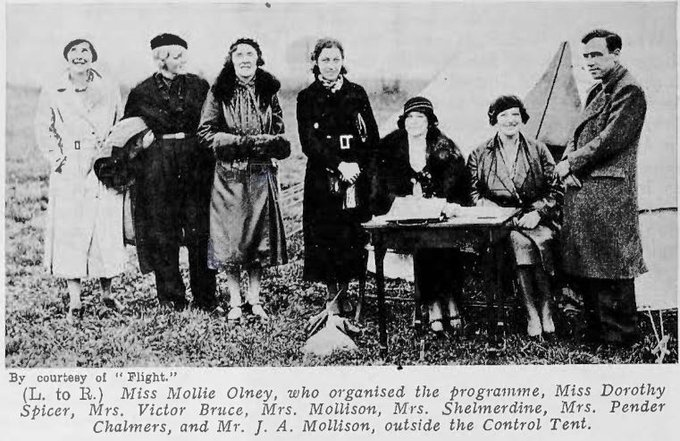
Mollie Olney, Dorothy Spicer, Mrs Victor Bruce, Amy Johnson, Lady Lillian Shelmerdine, Mrs Pender Chalmers & Jim Mollison at Atlantic Park Southampton in 1932.

In 1933, she gave a talk called "My Flying Visit" at the Minerva Club organised by the publication The Vote. In 1937, she gave a lecture arranged by the Electrical Association for Women entitled "By Air to Baghdad, Babylon and Ur". She twice took part in the King's Cup Race, a cross country air race.

At the annual dinner of the Women's Engineering Society in 1937, Sir Francis Shelmerdine, director general of civil aviation, paid tribute to Mrs Pender Chalmers, who was present at the dinner, for becoming 'air-minded' and demonstrating the general use of the light plane in the days before private aerodromes were developed.

She chaired meetings organised by the Women's Engineering Society, such as one in a series of six aeronautical debates and discussions on "The Airship and the Flying Boat" in 1935 and at least two of a spring 1935 series of debates on aviation called "The Flying Boat and the Airship" and "Possible Effects of Flying on Future Generations".

== Personal life ==
On 16 June 1915, Burlingham married Lieutenant John William Pender Chalmers (1889–1977). During this period, she was well known as Mrs Pender Chalmers. They later divorced.

On 23 December 1937, she married Frank Forrest (1879–1950), who was chief engineer and manager of the Birmingham Corporation Electricity Department. She continued her involvement with the Birmingham branch of the Electrical Association for Women as Mrs Frank Forrest. In 1939, she adjudicated a public speaking competition in Birmingham organised by the British Electrical Development Association.

Maysie Forrest died on 29 July 1982 and is buried along with her husband in the churchyard at Uplyme.

== Professional memberships ==
- Women's Engineering Society
- Vice Chairman of the Electrical Association for Women
- Chairman of Directors of the Forum Club

== Publications ==
=== Articles ===
- "Aeronautical Training for Women", The Woman Engineer, March 1932
- "Home Lighting", The Electrical Review, 8 October 1937

=== Lectures ===
- "By Air to Baghdad, Babylon & Ur", E.L.M.A. Lighting Service Bureau, 27 October 1931
- "My Flying Visit", Minerva Club, 29 June 1933
