= Jessie Ennis (motorcyclist) =

British motorcycle racer and stunt rider

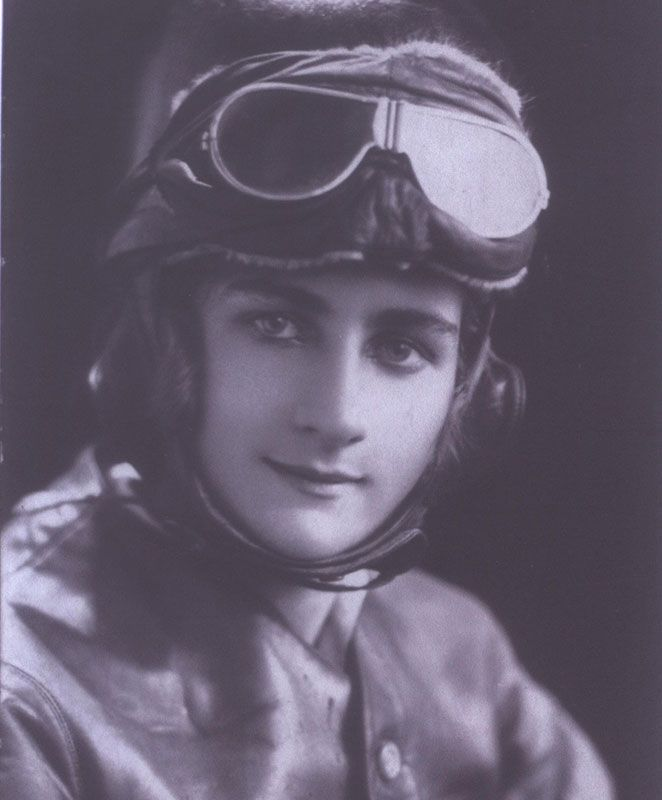
- Born: 19 September 1908
- Died: 2006
- Occupation: Stunt performer

Jessie Ennis born Jessie Rosina Hole (19 September 1908 – 2006) was a British motorcycle trials rider, stunt rider and founder of the London Ladies' Motor Club.

== Early life ==
Jessie Rosina Hole was born in Battersea on 19 September 1908. Her father was George Hole who managed the Gas Light and Coke Company gas works in Battersea. She had an elder brother, William George Hole, who was christened on the same day as his sister at St Mary Magdalene, Littleton, Shepperton, Surrey on 14 December 1913.

== Motorcycling ==
William decided to resurrect a Douglas motor bike. Jessie was eleven, the First World War was ending and that was where the motor bike had come from. The bike was coloured khaki and rust and it needed serious attention. She saw a lot as she watched her brother, who was five years older than her, restore the bike to working order.

Ennis' brother tested the bike on the cinder track of the gas works and then he allowed his younger sister to try it out. She was so small that her brother had to keep up with her so that he could catch the bike when she stopped.

Ennis had her own 600cc Scott Flying Squirrel motorbike when she was sixteen.

In 1926 or 1927, Ennis founded the London Ladies' Motor Club which was a women's motorcycle club. The club president was Kathleen Pelham Burn (Countess of Drogheda), and Betty Debenham acted as the press secretary. Other notable members included Betty's twin sister Nancy Debenham, Marjorie Cottle, Mrs Victor Bruce and Violette Cordery.

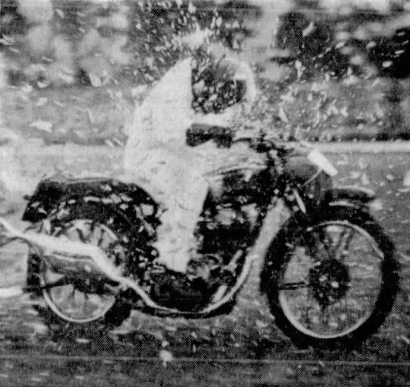
Jessie Hole riding through a plate of glass at Crystal Palace in 1936

Ennis was employed by Norman Downes of New Imperial Motors to be their trials rider in 1927. Downes hoped that her example would be followed, and his motorcycle company would attract more women owners. In 1928, the first motorcycle race organised exclusively for women at the Brooklands track took place. Nine of the ten women finished and Ennis took second place half a mile behind M Ruffell whose finishing speed was 78 mph. This competition was part of a meet organised by the Essex Motor Club and saw Jill Scott (under her married name Mrs W. B. Scott) record a speed of 114^{1/4} mph, a record at the time for a woman on that course.

Ennis was sponsored by New Imperial Motors until 1938 when the company closed.

Ennis met her husband William "Bill" Ennis when she asked him to fix her car at a race meeting. They married in 1939.

Ennis drove ambulances during the war and afterwards she formed a stunt team with her brother. She retired from motorcycling in 1951.

== Death and legacy ==
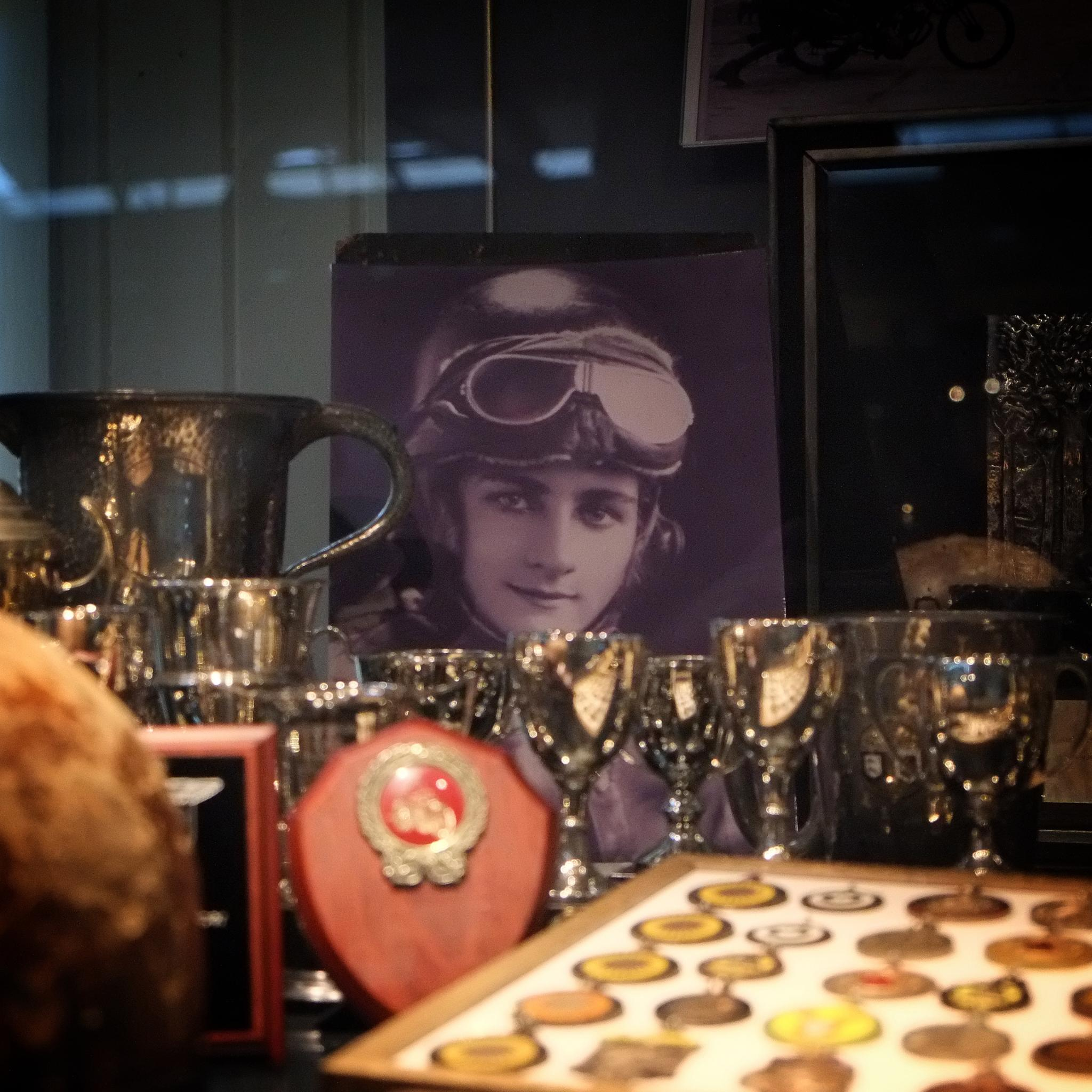
Brooklands Museum display

Ennis died in 2006. There is a display of her trophies at the Brooklands museum.
