= International Six Days Enduro =

Motorcycle classifications

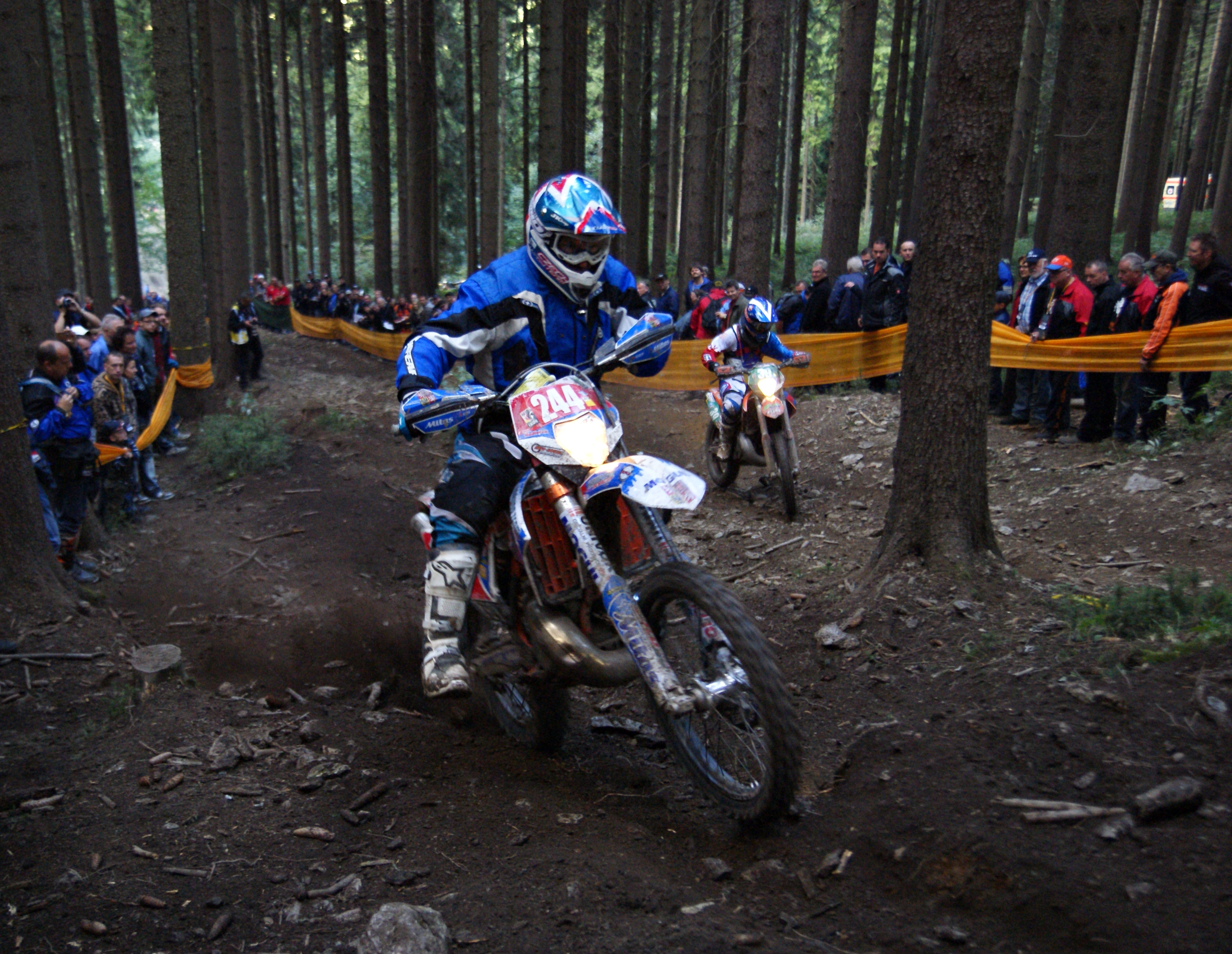
ISDE Saxony Steep hill Hormersdorf No. 244 Michal Kadlecek Trophy Team Czech.

The International Six Days Enduro (ISDE), formerly known as the International Six Days Trial (ISDT), is the oldest 'off-road' motorcycle event on the FIM Calendar.

The ISDT was first held in 1913 at Carlisle, England. It has occurred annually, apart from interruptions due to World War I and World War II, at various locations throughout the world. The early events were a true test of machine, rider skill and reliability. Held on the 'roads' of that era, today most of the routes are truly 'off-road'. Originally titled the International Six Days Trial, in 1981 the FIM decided to update the name to International Six Days Enduro, the name Enduro having been devised by the Americans and popularised by many motorcycle manufacturers also greater reflected the change in the event from a trial to more akin to a rally featuring skills more associated with cross country motocross.

The sport has been associated with many great motorcyclists before its 100th anniversary in 2013; this also includes women such as 1920s-30s star Marjorie Cottle. Up until 1973 the contest was always held in Europe. In 1973 it went outside continent for the first time, to the United States. Since then it has been outside Europe more frequently: twice in Australia (1992 and 1998), once more in the United States (1994), Brazil (2003), New Zealand in 2006, Chile in 2007 and 2018, and Mexico in 2010. The 2014 event was held from the 3 to 8 of November in San Juan, Argentina.

The event has attracted national teams from as many as 32 countries in recent years. Over its long history the rules and conditions have changed to keep in step with the developments in the sport, but it remains a supreme test of rider and machine. Over the six days and upwards of 1250 miles a rider must contend with strict rules about time allowances and restrictions on mechanical replacements, carrying out their own motorcycle repairs. The ISDE can attract entries of more than 500 riders, together with thousands of support crew and spectators. This has a major impact on tourist income for the venue in which it is based each year. For 2013, the 100th anniversary of the holding of the first ISDT, the FIM announced that there were a record number of pre-entry requests of 820 covering 35 nations from across the Globe with 600 entries being allowed to compete.

Usually referred to as the 'Olympics of Motorcycling' with trophies for best four-rider national, three-rider junior national, three-rider women's national, three-rider club national and three-rider manufacturing teams. Gold, silver and bronze medals are awarded on an individual level. The medals are typically awarded based on percentage of finishers, or relative to the best individual performance in the event within their specific class. Individual gold medals go to participants who finish within 10% of their class' top competitor's total elapsed time, silver medals are awarded for those who finish within 25%, and bronze medals are awarded to any rider who finishes all six days within their time allowance.

Most recently the ISDE has been embroiled in controversy. During the 2015 event held in Slovakia, the Australian team were leading the overall Men's World Trophy team classification on day 3. During this day, three of France's six competitors were disqualified from the event by the multinational ISDE committee for not completing the required course. Australia then rode the following days to manage their lead against second place Italy, until day 5 when the French team were reinstated into the event by the French-founded Fédération Internationale de Motocyclisme without any penalty, despite having not completed the assigned course. This put the French team into the lead and with only one short day of riding to go the Australian team was unable to cut the French lead down enough during the final day. The FIM ultimately gave the victory to France in highly controversial circumstances. Australia protested by walking off the podium and lodged a protest against the result due to the uncertainty of winning the ISDE actually requires riding the course.

However, on 2 November of that year, the FIM International Disciplinary Court (CDI) rejected the appeals lodged by the Fédération Française de Motocyclisme (FFM), the Real Federación de Motociclimo (RFME) and the Auto-Cycle Union (ACU) therefore, the decision made by the ISDE committee to disqualify the eight riders for missing a routine check was upheld meaning three of the French World Trophy team were disqualified resulting in team being reclassified to 23rd with Australia officially awarded as winner of the 2015 World Trophy title.

== Trivia ==
Hollywood actor Steve McQueen and his friends Bud Ekins, Dave Ekins, Cliff Coleman and John Steen represented United States at the 1964 ISDT held in East Germany. This would be the first United States team ever, organized by John Penton.

== Winners ISDT 1913–1980 ==
Edition	Year	Location	International Trophy	Silver Vase	Note
1.	1913	Carlisle, United Kingdom	United Kingdom W. B. Gibb; W. B. Little; Charlie Collier	Not awarded	
ND.	1914	Grenoble, France	-	-	The Second edition was abandoned as a result of the outbreak of World War I.
2.	1920	Grenoble, France	Switzerland J. Morand; A. Robert; Eduard Gex	Not awarded	
3.	1921	Geneva, Switzerland	Switzerland J. Morand; A. Rothenbach; Eduard Gex	Not awarded	
4.	1922	Geneva, Switzerland	Switzerland J. Morand; A. Robert; Eduard Gex	not awarded	
5.	1923	Stockholm, Sweden	Sweden Gustav Göthe; Yngve Eriksson; Bernhard Malmberg; J A Bylund	Not awarded	
6.	1924	Chaudfontaine, Belgium	United Kingdom G. S. Arter; C. Wilson; F. W. Giles	Norway C. Vaumund; O. Graff; J. Juberget	Silver Vase Award introduced.
7.	1925	Southampton, United Kingdom	United Kingdom Bert Kershaw; G. S. Arter; F. W. Giles	United Kingdom Bert Kershaw; G. S. Arter; F. W. Giles	
8.	1926	Buxton, United Kingdom	United Kingdom Graham Walker; J. Lidstone; P. Pike	United Kingdom Graham Walker; J. Lidstone; P. Pike	This was the first year a Ladies only team entered in the Vase contest and they were 3rd.
9.	1927	Ambleside, United Kingdom	United Kingdom L. Crisp; Graham Walker; F. W. Giles	United Kingdom Marjorie Cottle; Edyth Foley; Louie McLean	This is the only year the Silver Vase award was won by a Women's team
10.	1928	Harrogate, United Kingdom	United Kingdom V. C. King; F. W. Neill; H. G. Uzzell	United Kingdom L. Crisp; Graham Walker; F. W. Giles	
11.	1929	Munich, Germany - Geneva, Switzerland	United Kingdom G. R. Butcher; George Rowley; F. W. Neill	United Kingdom L. A. Welch; A. R. Edwards; H. S. Perrey	
12.	1930	Grenoble, France	Kingdom of Italy Rosolino Grana; Luigi Gilera; Miro Maffeis	France A. Sourdot; R. Debaissieux; N. Coulon	
13.	1931	Merano, Italy	Kingdom of Italy Rosolino Grana; Luigi Gilera; Miro Maffeis	Netherlands D. H. Eysink; G. Bakker-Schut; A.P. van Hammersveld	
14.	1932	Merano, Italy	United Kingdom Albert E. Perrigo; George Rowley; N. P. O. Bradley	United Kingdom Graham Walker; Jack Williams; R. MacGregor	
15.	1933	Llandrindod Wells, Wales	Nazi Germany Ernst Jakob Henne; Josef Stelzer; Josef Mauermayer; Wiggerl Kraus	United Kingdom Vic Brittain; Jack Williams; G. F. Povey	
16.	1934	Garmisch-Partenkirchen, Germany	Nazi Germany Ernst Jakob Henne; Josef Stelzer; Josef Mauermayer; Wiggerl Kraus	United Kingdom F.E. Thacker; R. MacGregor; L. Heath; G. A. Wolsey	
17.	1935	Oberstdorf, Germany	Nazi Germany Ernst Jakob Henne; Josef Stelzer; Wiggerl Kraus; J. Müller	Nazi Germany Arthur Geiss; Walfried Winkler; Ewald Kluge	
18.	1936	Freudenstadt, Germany	United Kingdom Vic Brittain; George Rowley; W.S. Waycott; E. Belsten	United Kingdom R. MacGregor; J.A.McL. Leslie; J.C. Edward	
19.	1937	Llandrindod Wells, Wales	United Kingdom Vic Brittain; George Rowley; W.S. Waycott; Gordon Wolsey	Netherlands A.P. van Hammersveld; G. Bakker-Schut; J. Moejes	
20.	1938	Llandrindod Wells, Wales	United Kingdom George Rowley; Jack Williams; Vic Brittain; W.S. Waycott; Gordon Wolsey	Nazi Germany Georg Meier; Rudolf Seltsam; Josef Forstner	
21.	1939	Salzburg, Austria	-	-	
22.	1947	Zlín, Czechoslovakia	Czechoslovakia Jaroslav Simandl; Richard Dusil; Václav Stanislav; Jan Bednář; Karl Hansl	Czechoslovakia Čeněk Kohlíček; Emanuel Marha; Josef Paštika	
23.	1948	San Remo, Italy	United Kingdom A. Jefferies; B.H.M. Viney; J. Williams; C.N. Rogers; Vic Brittain	United Kingdom P.H. Alves; C. M. Ray; W.J. Stocker	
24.	1949	Llandrindod Wells, Wales	United Kingdom P.H. Alves; C.M. Ray; C.N. Rogers; Frederick Maurice Rist; B.H.M. Viney	Czechoslovakia Emanuel Marha; František Bláha; J. Krcmar	
25.	1950	Llandrindod Wells, Wales	United Kingdom Frederick Maurice Rist; B.H.M. Viney; P.H. Alves; W.J. Stocker; C.M. Ray	United Kingdom D.S. Evans; E. Usher; A.F. Gaymer	
26.	1951	Varese, Italy	United Kingdom Frederick Maurice Rist; B.H.M. Viney; P.H. Alves; W.J. Stocker; C.M. Ray	Netherlands P. Haaker; C. van Rijssel; H. Veer	
27.	1952	Bad Aussee, Austria	Czechoslovakia Čeněk Kohlíček; Jaroslav Pudil; Richard Dusil; Jiří Kubeš; Jan Novotný	Czechoslovakia František Bláha; Vojtěch Kolář; Bohumil Kabát	
28.	1953	Gottwaldov, Czechoslovakia	United Kingdom Johnny Brittain; W.J. Stocker; S.B. Manns; P.H. Alves; B.H.M. Viney	Czechoslovakia František Bláha; Vojtěch Kolář; Bohumil Kabát	
29.	1954	Llandrindod Wells, Wales	Czechoslovakia Bohuslav Roučka; Jaroslav Pudil; Saša Klimt; Jiří Kubeš; Vladimír Šedina	Netherlands S. Schram; B.L. Jansema; M. den Haan	
30.	1955	Gottwaldov, Czechoslovakia	West Germany Johann Abt; Otto Brack; Udo Feser; Ernst Deike; Volker von Zitzewitz	Czechoslovakia Stanislav Štástka; Zdeněk Polánka; Miloslav Souček	
31.	1956	Garmisch-Partenkirchen, Germany	Czechoslovakia Miloslav Souček; Jaroslav Pudil; Bohuslav Roučka; Zdeněk Polánka; Vladimír Šedina; Saša Klimt	Netherlands J.S. van Hoek; B.L. Jansema; J. Th. Witberg; Fritz R. Selling	
32.	1957	Špindlerův Mlýn, Czechoslovakia	West Germany Lorenz Specht; Richard Heßler; Gernot Leistner; Walter Aukthun; Klaus Kämper; Volker von Zitzewitz	Czechoslovakia Vladimír Štěpán; Oldřich Hameršmíd; Antonín Matějka; Karel Buchnar	
33.	1958	Garmisch-Partenkirchen, Germany	Czechoslovakia Vladimír Šedina; Saša Klimt; Antonín Matějka; Zdeněk Polánka; Jaroslav Pudil; Bohuslav Roučka	Czechoslovakia Stanislav Štástka; František Darebný; Alois Roučka; Arnošt Zemen	
34.	1959	Gottwaldov, Czechoslovakia	Czechoslovakia Vladimír Šedina; Saša Klimt; Antonín Matějka; Zdeněk Polánka; Jaroslav Pudil; Bohuslav Roučka	Czechoslovakia Vladimír Štěpán; Oldřich Hameršmíd; František Hoffer; František Bouška	
35.	1960	Bad Aussee, Austria	Austria Karl Heinz Behrendt; Hans Leitner; Egon Dornaver; Josef Kleinschuster; Rupert Köberl; Siegfried Stuhlberger	Italy Luigi Gorini; Tullio Masserini; Eugenio Saini; Fausto Vergani	
36.	1961	Llandrindod Wells, Wales	West Germany Günter Dotterweich; Richard Heßler; Lorenz Müller; Sebastian Nachtmann; Erwin Schmider; Lorenz Specht	Czechoslovakia František Bouška; Oldřich Hameršmíd; Vladimír Štěpán	
37	1962	Garmisch-Partenkirchen, Germany	Czechoslovakia František Bouška; František Hoffer; Drahoslav Miarka; Zdeněk Polánka; Bohuslav Roucka; Vladimír Štěpán	West Germany Horst Rothermund; Heinz Klingenschmidt; Volker Kramer; Günter Sengfelder	
38.	1963	Špindlerův Mlýn, Czechoslovakia	East Germany Günter Baumann; Peter Uhlig; Hans Weber; Horst Lohr; Bernd Uhlmann; Werner Salevsky	Italy Luigi Gorini; Carlo Moscheni; Giuseppe Panarari; Nino Tagli	
39.	1964	Erfurt, East Germany	East Germany Günter Baumann; Peter Uhlig; Hans Weber; Horst Lohr; Bernd Uhlmann; Werner Salevsky	East Germany Gottfried Pohlan; Siegfried Rauhut; Lothar Schünemann; Ewald Schneidewind	
40.	1965	Isle of Man	East Germany Peter Uhlig; Hans Weber; Horst Lohr; Bernd Uhlmann; Werner Salevsky; Karlheinz Wagner	East Germany Günter Baumann; Klaus Teuchert; Horst Golz; Werner Stiegler	
41.	1966	Villingsberg, Sweden	East Germany Peter Uhlig; Hans Weber; Horst Lohr; Werner Salevsky; Karlheinz Wagner; Klaus Teuchert	West Germany Norbert Gabler; Klaus Kämper; Dieter Kramer; Erwin Schmider	
42.	1967	Zakopane, Poland	East Germany Peter Uhlig; Hans Weber; Werner Salevsky; Karlheinz Wagner; Klaus Teuchert; Klaus Halser	Czechoslovakia Arnošt Zemen; D. Miarka; M. Vytlacil; J. Jasansky	
43.	1968	San Pellegrino Terme, Italy	West Germany Andreas Brandl; Heinz Brinkmann; Siegfried Gienger; Dieter Kramer; Volker Kramer; Lorenz Specht	Italy Demetrio Bonini; Arnaldo Farioli; Francesco Foresti; Giuseppe Signorelli	
44.	1969	Garmisch-Partenkirchen, Germany	East Germany Peter Uhlig; Werner Salevsky; Karlheinz Wagner; Klaus Teuchert; Klaus Halser; Fred Williamowski	West Germany Helmut Beranek; Norbert Gabler; Hans Trinkner; Rolf Witthöft	
45.	1970	El Escorial, Spain	Czechoslovakia Josef Fojtík; Jaroslav Bříza; Květoslav Mašita; Zdeněk Češpiva; František Mrázek; Petr Čemus	Czechoslovakia Josef Císař; Jiří Jasanský; Miroslav Vytlačil; Josef Rabas	
46.	1971	Isle of Man	Czechoslovakia František Mrázek; Květoslav Mašita; Jaroslav Bříza; Petr Čemus; Zdeněk Češpiva; Josef Fojtík	Czechoslovakia Josef Císar; Jiří Jasanský; Miroslav Vytlačil; Josef Rabas	
47.	1972	Špindlerův Mlýn, Czechoslovakia	Czechoslovakia Jaroslav Bříza; Petr Čemus; Zdeněk Češpiva; Josef Císař; František Mrázek; Josef Fojtík	Czechoslovakia Pavel Cihelka; Josef Rabas; Milan Jedlička; Petr Válek	
48.	1973	Dalton, USA	Czechoslovakia Josef Fojtík; Zdeněk Češpiva; Josef Císař; Květoslav Mašita; František Mrázek; Petr Čemus	United States Dick Burleson; Malcolm Smith; Ed Schmidt; Ron Bohn	
49.	1974	Camerino, Italy	Czechoslovakia Josef Fojtík; Zdenek Češpiva; Josef Císař; Květoslav Mašita; Jiří Stodůlka; Petr Čemus	Czechoslovakia Josef Rabas; Pavel Cihelka; Milan Jedlička; Jaroslav Bříza	
50.	1975	Isle of Man	West Germany Josef Wolfgruber; Peter Neumann; Eberhard Weber; Jürgen Grisse; Rolf Witthöft; Eddy Hau	Italy Gualtiero Brissoni; Pietro Gagni; Attilio Petrogalli; Pierluigi Rottigni	
51.	1976	Zeltweg, Austria	West Germany Josef Wolfgruber; Peter Neumann; Eberhard Weber; Jürgen Grisse; Rolf Witthöft; Eddy Hau	Czechoslovakia Milan Jedlička; Pavel Cihelka; Jaroslav Kauler; Otakar Toman	
52.	1977	Považská Bystrica, Czechoslovakia	Czechoslovakia František Mrázek; Otakar Toman; Květoslav Mašita; Jiří Stodůlka; Stanislav Zloch; Jozef Císar	Czechoslovakia Pavel Cihelka; Milan Jedlička; Jiří Pošík; Petr Válek	
53.	1978	Värnamo, Sweden	Czechoslovakia František Mrázek; Jozef Chovančík; Květoslav Mašita; Jiří Pošík; Stanislav Zloch; Jiří Stodůlka	Italy Luigi Medardo; Gino Perego; Osvaldo Scaburri; Giuseppe Signorelli	
54.	1979	Neunkirchen, West Germany	Italy Elia Andrioletti; Franco Gualdi; Gualtiero Brissoni; Augusto Taiocchi; Guglielmo Andreini; Gianangelo Croci	Czechoslovakia Josef Kauler; Jaroslav Kmošťák; Zdeněk Runkas; Jiří Císař	
55.	1980	Brioude, France	Italy Guglielmo Andreini; Elia Andrioletti; Gualtiero Brissoni; Gianangelo Croci; Andrea Marinoni; Augusto Taiocchi	West Germany Arnulf Teuchert; Bert von Zitzewitz; Reinhard Christel; Rolf Witthöft	

== Winners ISDE since 1981 ==
Edition	Year	Location	World Trophy	Junior Trophy	Women's Trophy
56.	1981	Italy, Isola d'Elba	Italy Gualtiero Brissoni; Alessandro Gritti; Luigi Medardo; Gianangelo Croci; Franco Gualdi; Augusto Taiocchi	Italy Cesare Bernardi; Gianpiero Findanno; Andrea Marinoni; Angelo Signorelli	Not awarded
57.	1982	Czechoslovakia, Považská Bystrica	Czechoslovakia Jiří Císař; Zdeněk Bělský; Emil Čunderlík; Vladimír Janouš; Jozef Chovančík; Stanislav Zloch	East Germany Horst Geißenhöner; Steffen Mauersberger; Reinhard Klädtke; Uwe Weber	Not awarded
58.	1983	United Kingdom, Wales	Sweden Peter Jansson; Per Grönberg; Sven Erik Jönsson; Hans Hansson; Lindbom; Thomas Gustavsson	Sweden Jacobsson; Karlsson; Andersson; Zell	Not awarded
59.	1984	Netherlands, Assen	Netherlands Dinand Zijlstra; Henk van Mierlo; Martin Schalkwijk; Henk Poorte; Simon Schram; Gerrit Wolsink	East Germany Jens Thalmann; B. Lämmel; Reinhardt Kladtke; Andreas Cyffka	Not awarded
60.	1985	Spain, La Molina	Sweden Peter Jansson; Per Grönberg; Dick Wicksell; Svenerik Jönsson; Hålan Lundberg; Thomas Gustavsson	East Germany Andreas Cyffka; Mike Heydenreich; Jens Grüner Udo Grellmann	Not awarded
61.	1986	Italy, San Pellegrino Terme	Italy Angelo Signorelli; Renato Pegurri; Tullio Pellegrinelli; Gianangelo Croci; Gugliemo Andreini; Edi Orioli	Italy Paolo Fellegara; Giorgio Grasso; Stefano Passeri; Enrico Zuffa	Not awarded
62.	1987	Poland, Jelenia Góra	East Germany Jens Thalmann; Reinhard Klädtke; Uwe Weber; Harald Sturm; Jens Scheffler; Jens Grüner	East Germany Mike Heydenreich; Udo Grellmann; Thomas Bieberbach; Danielo Pörschke	Not awarded
63.	1988	France, Mende	France Thierry Charbonnier; Stéphane Peterhansel; Gilles Lalay; Jean Paul Charles; Alan Olivier; Marc Morales	Italy Luca Trussardi; Massimo Migliorati; Enrico Zuffa; Davide Trolli	Not awarded
64.	1989	Germany, Walldürn	Italy Gianmarco Rossi; Stefano Passeri; Angelo Signorelli; Luca Trussardi; Paolo Fellagara; Franco Gualdi	Finland Kari Tiainen; Juha-Pekka Leino; Jarkko Vainio; Jouni Sauren	Not awarded
65.	1990	Sweden, Västerås	Sweden Jeff Nilsson; Dick Wicksell; Kent Karlsson; Svenerik Jönsson; Peter Hansson; Jimmie Eriksson	Sweden Robert Grönlund; Robert Svensson; Peter Karlsson; Peter Lundfeldt	Not awarded
66.	1991	Czechoslovakia, Považská Bystrica	Sweden Jeff Nilsson; Joachim Hedendahl; Svenerik Jönsson; Dick Wicksell; Kent Karlsson; Bill Andersson	United States Steve Hatch; Jimmy Lewis; David Rhodes; Chris Smith	Not awarded
67.	1992	Australia, Cessnock	Italy Paolo Fellegara; Fabio Farioli; Stefano Passeri; Mario Rinaldi; Giovanni Sala; Arnaldo Nicoli	Sweden Anders Eriksson; Robert Grönlund; Peter Karlsson; Peter Jansson	Not awarded
68.	1993	Netherlands, Assen	Poland Marek Dabrowski; Maciej Wrobel; Wiktor Iwański; Wojciech Rencz; Andrzej Tomiczek; Ryszard Augustyn	Netherlands Peter Lenselink; Patrick Isfordink; Erik Davids; Hans Arends	Not awarded
69.	1994	United States, Tulsa	Italy Maurizio Carminati; Tullio Pellegrinelli; Mario Rinaldi; Fabio Farioli; Arnold Nicoli; Giovanni Sala	Sweden Rickard Larsson; Björn Carlsson; Linus Broaar; Morgan Jansson	Not awarded
70.	1995	Poland, Jelenia Góra	Italy Gianmarco Rossi; Paolo Fellegara; Giorgio Grasso; Giuseppe Gallino; Tullio Pellegrinelli; Arnaldo Nicoli	Australia Shawn Reed; Shane Watts; Ian Cunningham; Jamie Cunningham	Not awarded
71.	1996	Finland, Hämeenlinna	Finland Kari Tiainen; Jani Laaksonen; Pekka Viljakainen; Petteri Silván; Mika Ahola; Vesa Kytönen	Finland Tuomas Ahonen; Juha Salminen; Juha Laaksonen; Mika Marila	Not awarded
72.	1997	Italy, Brescia	Italy Fausto Scovolo; Stefano Passeri; Giovanni Sala; Jarno Boano; Mario Rinaldi; Fabio Farioli	Italy Pablo Peli; Ivan Boano; Alessio Paoli; Giovanni Genini	Not awarded
73.	1998	Australia, Traralgon	Finland Juha Salminen; Jani Laaksonen; Mika Ahola; Petteri Silván; Vesa Kytönen; Kari Tiainen	Spain Xavier Pons; Miki Arpa; Marc Coma; Gérard Farres	Not awarded
74.	1999	Portugal, Coimbra	Finland Samuli Aro; Mika Ahola; Jani Laaksonen; Vesa Kytönen; Kari Tiainen; Petri Pohjamo	Spain Arnau Vilanova; Xacob Agra; Gérard Farres; Miki Arpa	Not awarded
75.	2000	Spain, Granada	Italy Fausto Scovolo; Mario Rinaldi; Matteo Rubin; Arnaldo Nicoli; Giovanni Sala; Fabio Farioli	Spain Xavier Pons; Gérard Farrés; Xacob Agra; Jordi Duran	Not awarded
76.	2001	France, Brive la Gaillarde	France Marc Germain; Olivier Rebufie; Eric Bernard; David Fretigne; Sébastien Guillaume; Cyril Esquirol	Italy Simone Albergoni; Ivan Boano; Paolo Carrara; Giovanni Gritti	Not awarded
77.	2002	Czech Republic, Jablonec nad Nisou	Finland Mika Ahola; Juha Salminen; Petteri Silván; Samuli Aro; Jani Laaksonen; Petri Pohjamo	France Julien Dubac; Raphael André; Damien Miquel; Fabien Planet	Not awarded
78.	2003	Brazil, Fortaleza	Finland Juha Salminen; Mika Saarenkoski; Mika Ahola; Samuli Aro; Jani Laaksonen; Kari Tiainen	France Damien Miquel; Freddy Blanc; Herve Versace; Fabien Planet	Not awarded
79.	2004	Poland, Kielce	Finland Petteri Silván; Juha Salminen; Mika Saarenkoski; Samuli Aro; Jani Laaksonen; Mika Ahola	Finland Valtteri Salonen; Jari Mattila; Tomi Peltola; Marko Tarkkala	Not awarded
80.	2005	Slovakia, Považská Bystrica	Italy Alessandro Botturi; Alessandro Belometti; Simone Albergoni; Alessandro Zanni; Alessio Paoli; Giuliano Falgari	Italy Andrea Beconi; Maurizio Micheluz; Paolo Bernardi; Manuel Pievani	Not awarded
81.	2006	New Zealand, Taupō	Finland Juha Salminen; Samuli Aro; Mika Ahola; Marko Tarkkala; Petri Pohjamo; Jari Mattila	United States Kurt Caselli; Ricky Dietrick; Russell Bobbitt; David Pearson	Not awarded
82.	2007	Chile, La Serena	Italy Alessandro Belometti; Alex Salvini; Alessandro Botturi; Maurizio Micheluz; Fabrizio Dini; Andrea Belotti	Spain Cristóbal Guerrero; Oriol Mena; Lorenzo Santolino; Carlos Andreu	United States Nicole Bradford; Amanda Mastin; Lacy Jones
83.	2008	Greece, Serres	France Julien Gauthier; Jordan Curvalle; Rodrig Thain; Christophe Nambotin; Sebastien Guillaume; Nicolas Deparrois	Italy Thomas Oldrati; Oscar Balleti; Mirko Gritti; Vanni Cominotto	France Ludivine Puy; Audrey Rossat; Alice Geneste
84.	2009	Portugal, Figueira da Foz	France Julien Gauthier; Marc Germain; Marc Bourgeois; Rodrig Thain; Christophe Nambotin; Antoine Méo	Spain Victor Guerrero; Oriol Mena; Lorenzo Santolino; Mario Roman	France Ludivine Puy; Audrey Rossat; Stéphanie Bouisson
85.	2010	Mexico, Morelia	France Johnny Aubert; Nicolas Deparrois; Sébastien Guillaume; Rodrig Thain; Christophe Nambotin; Antoine Méo	Spain Victor Guerrero; Oriol Mena; Lorenzo Santolino; Mario Roman	France Ludivine Puy; Audrey Rossat; Blandine Dufrene
86.	2011	Finland, Kotka	Finland Eero Remes; Matti Seistola; Juha Salminen; Jari Mattila; Valtteri Salonen; Marko Tarkkala	France Alexandre Queyreyre; Benoit Fortunato; Mathias Bellino; Romain Dumontier	France Ludivine Puy; Blandine Dufrene; Juliette Berrez
87.	2012	Germany, Saxony	France Antoine Meo; Rodrig Thain; Johnny Aubert; Pierre-Alexandre Renet; Sebastien Guillaume; Cristophe Nambotin	France Jeremy Joly; Mathias Bellino; Alexandre Queyreyre; Kevin Rohmer	France Blandine Dufrene; Ludivine Puy; Audrey Rossat
88.	2013	Italy, Sardinia	France Pierre-Alexandre Renet; Jeremy Joly; Johnny Aubert; Antoine Meo; Rodrig Thain; Fabien Planet	France Swann Servajean; Kevin Rohmer; Mathias Bellino; Loic Larreau	Australia Jess Gardiner; Tayla Jones; Jemma Wilson
89.	2014	Argentina, San Juan	France Marc Bourgeois; Christophe Nambotin; Pierre-Alexandre Renet; Jeremy Tarroux; Anthony Boissiere; Fabien Planet	United States Grant Baylor; Steward Baylor; Trevor Bollinger; Justin Jones	Australia Jess Gardiner; Tayla Jones; Jemma Wilson
90.	2015	Slovakia, Košice	Australia Joshua Green; Daniel Milner; Matthew Phillips; Beau Ralston; Lachlan Stanford; Glen Kearney	Australia Broc Grabham; Tom Mason; Daniel Sanders; Tye Simmonds	Australia Jess Gardiner; Tayla Jones; Jemma Wilson
91.	2016	Spain, Navarre	United States Kailub Russell; Taylor Robert; Thad Duvall; Layne Michael	Sweden Mickel Persson; Albin Elowson; Jesper Börjesson	Australia Jess Gardiner; Tayla Jones; Jemma Wilson:
92.	2017	France, Brive-la-Gaillarde	France Jérémy Tarroux; Loïc Larrieux; Christophe Nambotin; Christophe Charlier	France Jérémy Miroir; Hugo Blanjoue; Anthony Geslin:	Australia Jess Gardiner; Tayla Jones; Jemma Wilson
93.	2018	Chile, Viña Del Mar	Australia Daniel Milner; Daniel Sanders; Lyndon Snodgrass; Joshua Strang	Italy Andrea Verona; Matteo Cavallo; Davide Soreca:	Australia Jess Gardiner; Tayla Jones; Machenzie Tricker
94.	2019	Portugal, Portimão	United States Stu Baylor; Taylor Robert; Kailub Russell; Ryan Sipes	Australia Michael Driscoll; Fraser Higlett; Lyndon Snodgrass	United States Tarah Gieger; Brandy Richards; Rebecca Sheets
ND.	2020	Italy, Lombardy and Piedmont	NO EVENT DUE TO COVID PANDEMIC		
95.	2021	Italy, Lombardy and Piedmont	Italy Andrea Verona; Davide Guarneri; Thomas Oldrati; Matteo Cavallo	Italy Lorenzo Macoritto; Manolo Morettini; Matteo Pavoni	United States Brandy Richards; Rachel Gutish; Britney Gallegos
96.	2022	France, Le-Puy-en-Velay	United Kingdom Steve Holcombe; Nathan Watson; Jed Etchells; Jamie McCanney	Italy Morgan Lesiardo; Enrico Rinaldi; Claudio Spanu	United Kingdom Jane Daniels; Rosie Rowett; Nieve Holmes
97.	2023	Argentina, San Juan	United States Taylor Robert; Johnny Girror; Dante Oliviera; Cole Martinez	France Thibaut Giraudon; Alix Antoine; Joyon Leo	United States Brandy Richards; Korrie Steede; Rachel Gutish
98.	2024	Spain, Galicia	France Theophile Espinasse; Hugo Blanjoue; Leo LeQuere; Julien Roussaly	Sweden Max Ahlin; Albin Norrbin; Axel Sem	United States Brandy Richards; Ava Silvestri; Rachel Gutish
99.	2025	Italy, Bergamo	Italy Andrea Verona; Samuele Bernardini; Morgan Lesiardo; Manolo Morettini	Italy Kevin Cristino; Alberto Elgari; Manuel Verzeroli	United States Brandy Richards; Korie Steede; Rachel Gutish
100.	2026	Portugal, Grândola	Italy Andrea Verona; Morgan Lesiardo; Samuele Bernardini; Matte Cavallo	Italy Alberto Elgari; Manuel Verzeroli; Kevin Cristino	United States Brandy Richards; Korie Steede; Rachel Gutish
