= Lindbom =

Lindbom or Lindbohm is a surname. Notable people with the surname include:

== Lindbom ==
- Alf Lindbom (1908–1987), Swedish chamber musician and painter
- Carl Lindbom (basketball) (born 1991), Finnish basketball player
- Carl Lindbom (ice hockey) (born 2003), Swedish ice hockey player
- Carl Georg Lindbom (1847–1922), Swedish chemist and lecturer
- Erik Lindbom (fl. c. 1920–1930), Swedish footballer
- Hans Lindbom (born 1953), Swedish football manager
- Johan Lindbom (born 1971), Swedish ice hockey player
- Johan Magnus Lindbom (1798–1862), Swedish priest
- Josef Lindbom (1889–1970), Swedish athlete
- Karl Petter Lindbom (1787–1849), Swedish restaurateur
- Kristian Lindbom (born 1989), Australian racing driver
- Lasse Lindbom (born 1949), Swedish artist, musician and music producer
- Mats Lindbom (born 1948), Swedish politician
- Olof Lindbom (born 2000), Swedish ice hockey player
- Oscar Lindbom (1883–1954), Swedish doctor and pathologist
- Otto Lindbom (1846–1905), Swedish naval officer
- Tage Lindbom (1909–2001), Swedish politician and conservative philosopher
- Tobias Lindbom (born 1979), Swedish swimmer
- Yvonne Lindbom (born 1954), Swedish painter and art educator

== Lindbohm ==
- Dénis Lindbohm (1927–2005), Swedish author and occultist
- Petteri Lindbohm (born 1993), Finnish ice hockey player
