= Mary E. Dillon =

American businesswoman (1886–1983)

- Born: June 15, 1885; Coney Island, New York
- Died: 20 October 1983 (aged 96–97); Honolulu, Hawaii
- Other names: Mrs Henry Farber
- Employer: Brooklyn Borough Gas Company
- Spouse: Henry Farber

Mary E. Dillon (June 15, 1885 – 20 October 1983) was an American businesswoman and president of Brooklyn Borough Gas Company. She was the first female president of any utility company in the world.

== Biography ==
Dillon was born in Coney Island, Brooklyn, one of 12 children. Dillon left Erasmus Hall High School in her senior year when she needed to replace her sister in her job at the Brooklyn Borough Gas Company in 1903 because of her family's limited income. She was 17 and started as a junior clerk. She was promoted within three years to office manager and went on to become general manager and vice president. In 1926, she was named president and chairman. She was the first woman to be the president of a utility.

In the early 1920s, Dillion joined the British Women's Engineering Society (WES) and the Electrical Association for Women, at the time the only such organisations in the world. She paid them a visit in London in 1925.

In the late 1920s, Dillon collaborated with another American member, Dr. Lillian Gilbreth, a leading expert in time and motion studies, on the creation of an efficient kitchen, equipped with gas powered appliances and named the "Kitchen Practical". Inspired by Dillon's criticisms of her own kitchen, it was designed on three principles: the correct and uniform height of working surfaces, a circular work place and a general "circular routing of working", all carefully analysed to reduce the time and effort required in the preparation of meals. It was unveiled in 1929 at a Women’s Exposition and formed the basis for Gilbraith's development of kitchen design principles which still underlie much of kitchen planning today.

Working in the Coney Island area, Dillon was also on the local school board. She was appointed to the Board of Education by Mayor Fiorello H. La Guardia in 1942 and was the first woman president of the board from 1944 to 1946. She was on the governing committee of the Brooklyn Institute of Arts and Sciences as well as a director of the Brooklyn and Coney Island Chambers of Commerce. During the Great Depression, in 1934, Dillon organised the Summer Portable Theater, known as the "theater on wheels". Dillon was also on the Mayor's Business Advisory Council and the War Council of the City of New York.

Dillon married Henry Farber in 1923 but always used her own name. Farber died in 1948. Dillon retired in 1949 and moved to Vermont until 1973 when she moved to Hawaii where she lived for the rest of her life.
