= Edna Mosley =

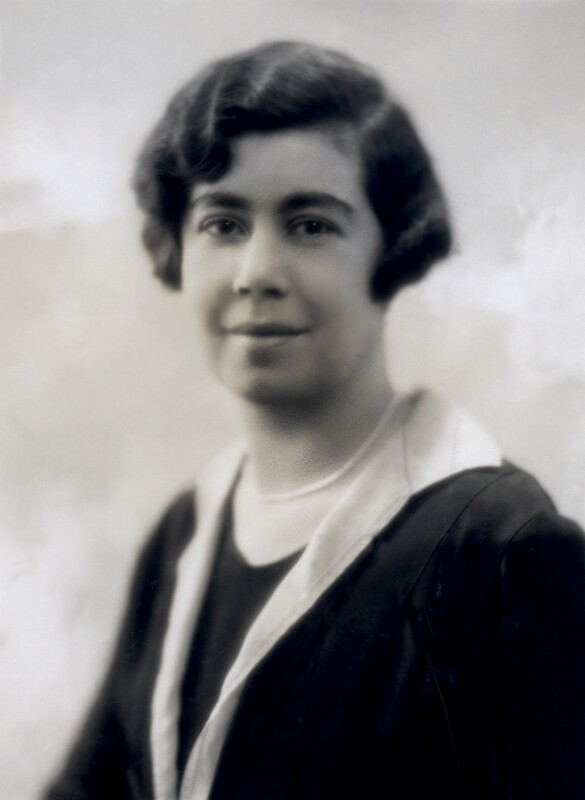
English architect Edna Mosley

Edna Mosley (20 December 1899 – 19 February 1954) was one of the first female professional architects in Britain, and was known for her designs for modern, labour-saving interiors, often aimed specifically at women.

== Career ==
Mosley was born in 1899 in St John's Wood, London, the daughter of Robert S. Mosley and his wife. She studied at the Architectural Association School of Architecture in London, and became an Associate member of the Royal Institute of British Architects.

Mosley worked for the Electrical Association for Women (EAW), of which she was also a member. These were specifically designs for domestic spaces that sought to persuade women of the benefits of using electricity in the home. Among these were the ‘Electrical Housecraft’ kitchen, where demonstrators for then-new appliances such as cookers, irons, and toasters could be trained. Mosley designed the Kitchen Cabinet Fitment which had “a control panel with one 15 amp. and three 5 amp. plug points above the working table; the wall behind the panel is hollow, and the wiring of the panel may be seen through a glass window; in the Demonstration Kitchen, strip and spot-lighting from a beam focus the attention on the lecturer’s table. She also designed the refurbishment of the joint EAW and Women's Engineering Society headquarters which opened at 20 Regent Street, London in 1933.

=== The Bachelor Girl's All-Electric Flat ===
In November 1930, there was an exhibition in the New Horticultural Hall, Westminster, London, entitled ‘The Bachelor Girls' Exhibition’. The EAW commissioned Mosley to design a demonstration flat that, according to the association, was the 'first public expression of a woman's idea of how the bachelor woman could live electrically'. The flat, designed as an exhibition stand but considered as a prototype for one unit of an accommodation block, was created in conjunction with the Electrical Development Association (absorbed into the Electricity Council in the 1960s).

The modernist flat comprised a small hall, a living room with a dining recess (including a fixed seat and sideboard), a kitchen, a bedroom, bathroom, toilet, and sun balcony. The flat was furnished with the most up-to-date electrical equipment, including a built-in electric fire.

=== Other designs ===
In 1946, Mosley also designed the 'kitchen of a cottage in a mining village' for the 'Britain Can Make It' exhibition of industrial and product design at the Victoria and Albert Museum, London, of 1946.

== Private life ==
Edna Mosley was married to Alfred Stocken Knott, and together they designed their own house at Peaslake in Surrey in 1932.
