= Louie McLean =

British motorcycle racer and trials rider

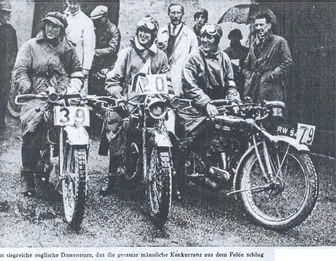
McLean (center) at the 1927 International Six Day Trial with Marjorie Cottle (left) and Edyth Foley (right)

Louie McLean née Ball (1900–1932) was a British motorcycle racer and trials rider. She was part of the team who won the Silver Vase at the 1927 International Six Days Trial: the only team of women to ever do so.

== Early life ==
She was born Louie Ball in 1900 and her father was a bicycle and motorcycle agent in Birmingham. At 15, she was featured in an article in The Motor Cycle which reported that she sometimes helped her father pick up machines from the Scott Motorcycle factory some 120 miles (190 km) distant by driving him there in a sidecar so he could ride the new motorcycle back to Birmingham. The magazine also printed a photo spread of the teenager helping her father in the garage and riding a motorcycle around the city.

== Career and marriage ==
Her first competition was the 1919 Auto-Cycle Union Stock Machine Trial (in which she rode a Scott motorcycle) and in 1923 she became a works rider for Scott. In 1924 she also obtained support from the James Cycle Co and began riding one of their twin-vee machines.

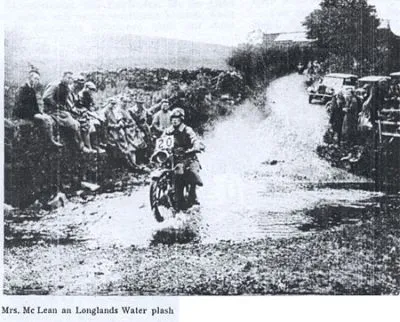
Crossing the Longlands watersplash at the 1927 ISDT

In 1926 she married fellow race rider George McLean and, shortly after their wedding, the couple both competed in that year's International Six Days Trial (ISDT). Although the British women didn't place in the competition, the team returned in 1927 when the event was held in the Lake District. The team, consisting of McLean, Marjorie Cottle, and Edyth Foley, won the Silver Vase by two marks over the second place Danish team. A Dutch barrister was so impressed by the team's performance that he organized a sort of victory tour where the women rode approximately 7,000 miles (11,000 km) through Belgium, France, Italy, Switzerland, Germany, Sweden, Norway, Denmark and the Netherlands. The team reunited to challenge for the vase again in 1929, and in the 1931 trial she won Best Lady Competitor.

In addition to her ISDT victory, McLean earned a second place at the 1927 Dunelt Trophy competition, and first place at the 1928 Holoway Cup.

== Death ==
McLean died in 1932 while giving birth to her second daughter.
