= Edyth Foley =

British motorcycle racer (1900–1985)

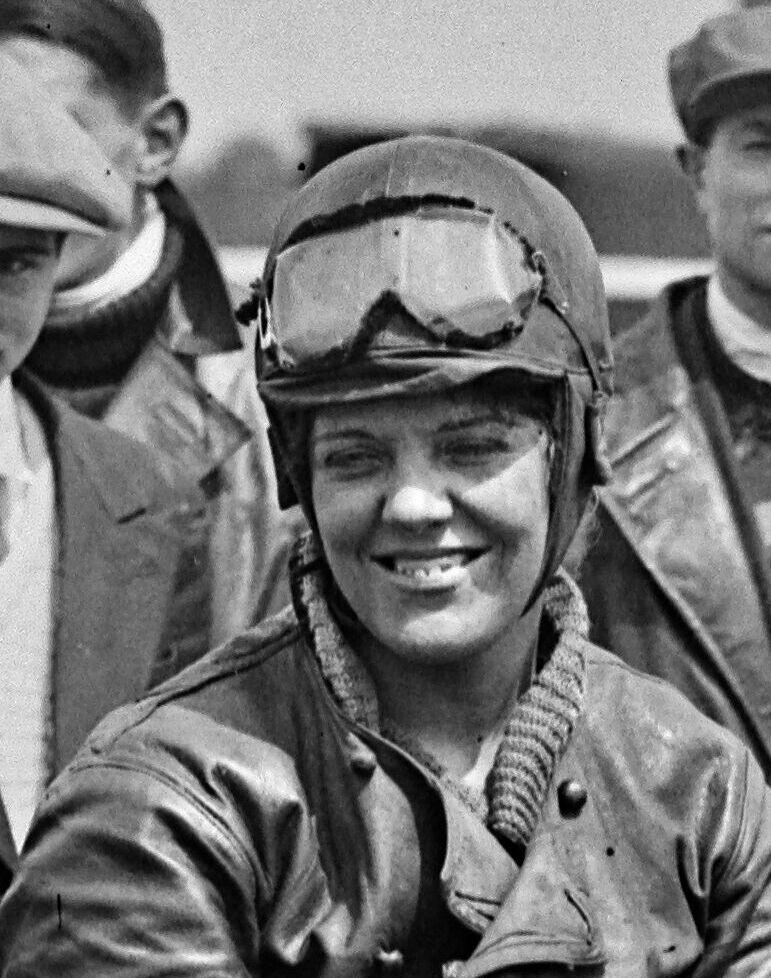
- Foley in 1931
- Born: 9 October 1900
- Died: May 1985 (aged 84)
- Occupation: Motorcycle racer
- Known for: Winning 1927 ISDT Silver Vase

Edyth Foley (9 October 1900 – May 1985) was a British motorcycle racer. Together with Marjorie Cottle and Louie McLean she won the International Silver Vase at the 1927 International Six Days Trial, held in the Lake District.

== Biography ==
Foley was born in Stockport, the second child of businessman Robert Foley and Amy Sharples. She had four siblings.

Foley began racing motorcycles at the age of 18 and quickly became one of the best female riders in England. She participated in various competitions, first gaining attention by completing the Daily Dispatch Trophy Trial.

In 1926 she teamed up with Marjorie Cottle and Louie McLean to compete in the 8th International Six Days Trial, finishing third. The following year they took part in the 9th International Six Day Trial and won the Silver Vase competition. Following this they then took part in a promotion tour through Europe.

In the following years the women's team participated in multiple Six Days events but could not repeat the success. In 1930 Foley competed in the 12th Six Days event teaming up again with Louie McLean and Betty Lermitte, achieving fourth place in the Silver Vase category. In the following years they again took part in the Six Days event but were not part of the national team. In 1934 she took part in the 16th International Six Days even in Garmisch-Partenkirchen riding a Zundapp, but withdrew.

On 28 September 1936 she married Daniel Stafford (28 March 1910–December 2000).
