= Ludivine Puy =

French motorcycle racer (born 1983)

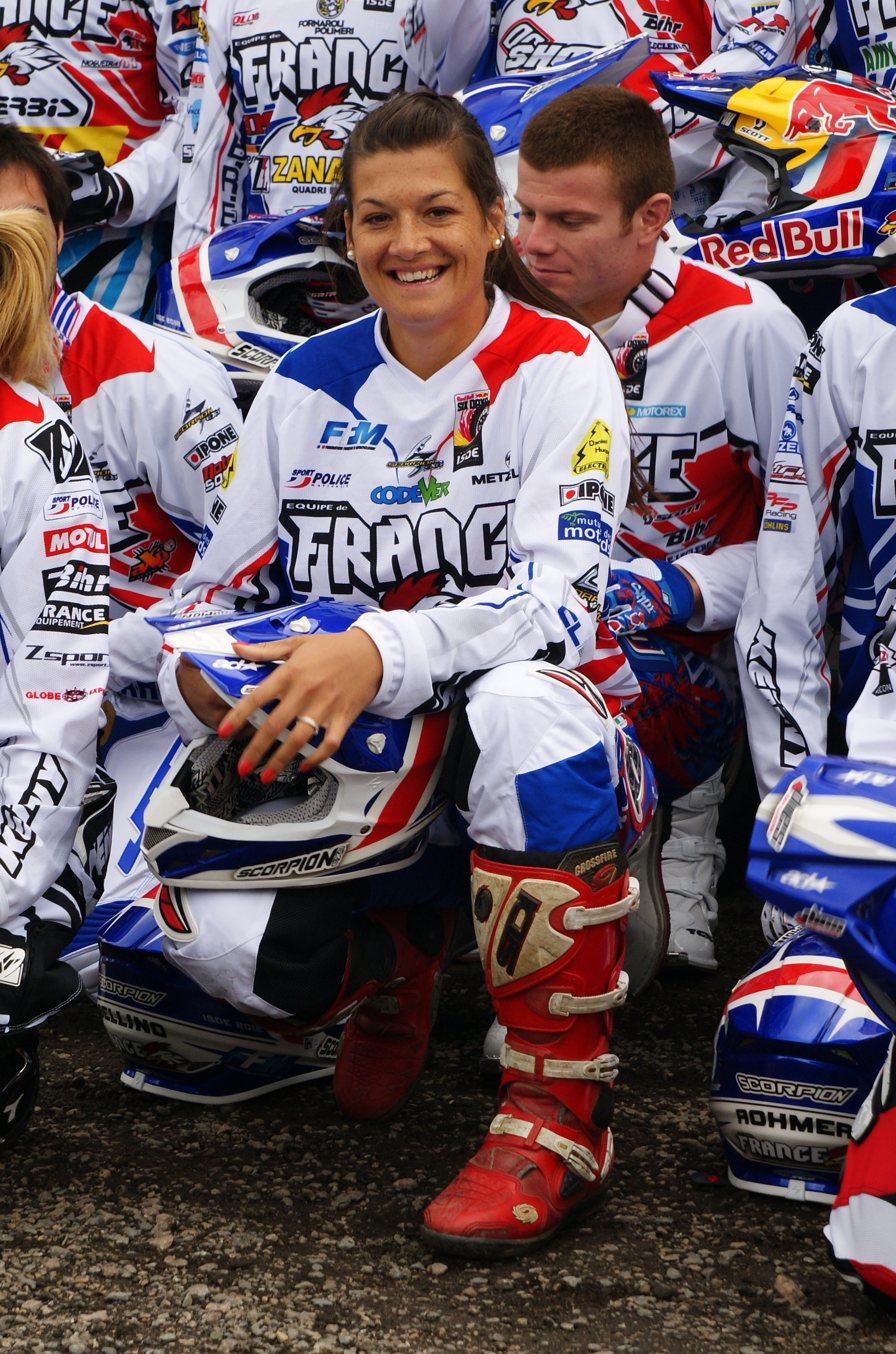
- Nationality: French
- Born: 30 June 1983 (age 43) Saint-Germain-en-Laye, France

Championship titles
- 2010–2011: Enduro World Championship Women's Champion

Ludivine "Lulu" Puy (born 30 June 1983) is a French former motorcycle racer. Among other things, she won the women's world championship title twice in the Enduro World Championship, won the European Enduro Championship three times, took part in the Dakar Rally and was part of the winning team at the International Six Days Enduro women's race five times from 2008 to 2012.

== Career ==
Puy competed for the Gas Gas team. She worked for the French police before professionally riding a motorcycle. In 2010 she won the first ever women's title in the Enduro World Championship. In addition to her international title, she also won the French Enduro Championship five times. While Puy clearly dominated the scene from 2007 to 2010, in 2011 and 2012, she competed with her Gas Gas teammate, the Spaniard Laia Sanz, for the place of the best enduro rider.

Puy completed her first Dakar Rally on a motorcycle in 2005 when she competed for the Euromaster team and reached the finish. In 2006, lying in 35th place in the motorcycle rankings, she avoided a boy on the track as the best woman and broke her hip joint in the subsequent fall. In 2007, she reached the goal again.

Puy announced that 2012 was her final racing season. In 2014 it was announced by the Fédération Internationale de Motocyclisme (FIM), (English: International Motorcycling Federation) that as part of its efforts to develop Women's Enduro, it was appointing Puy as Adviser for the FIM Women’s Enduro World Cup, to work with the Course Inspector to ensure that the design of the sections was adapted to female riders. She was to be the direct contact person for riders taking part in the World Cup and the FIM Enduro Commission.
