= Jess Gardiner =

Australian motorcycle racer

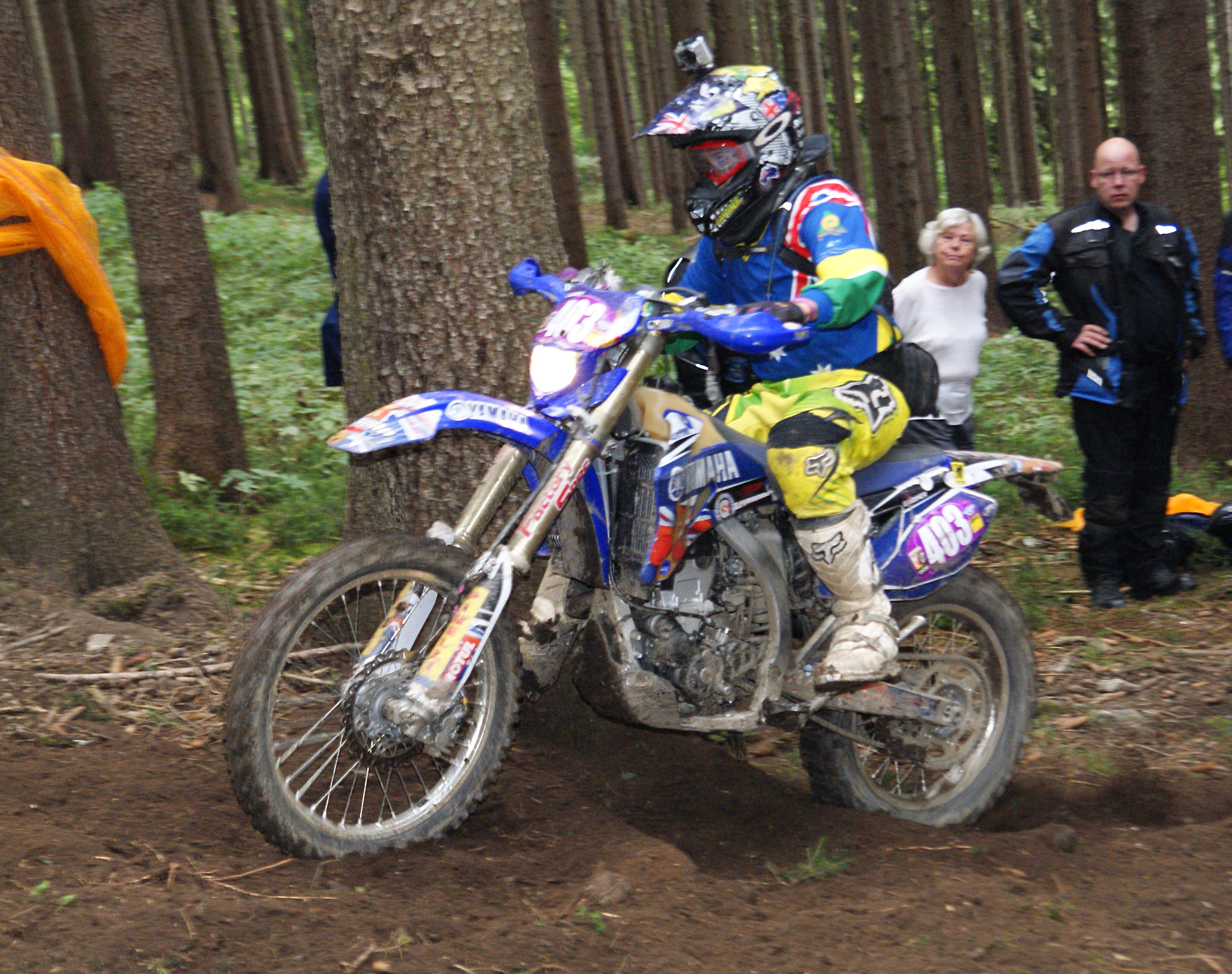

Jess Gardiner (born 1993) is an Australian off-road motorcycle racer competing in Enduro and Endurocross competitions.

Gardiner began her motorcycle racing career competing in motocross before transitioning to Enduro competitions. In 2013, Gardiner became the first Australian woman to win the International Six Days Enduro (Women's class). She's a 5-time champion of the Australian_Off_Road_Championship in the Women's class. She's sponsored by Yamaha, MXstore, Ballards Offroad. She's in a relationship with French rider and teammate, Jeremy Carpentier. Her "day job" is a heavy equipment operator with JK Williams Contracting Pty Ltd in Penrith, NSW, Australia.

== Results ==
Date	Event	Placing
17 Nov 2019	ISDE (Portugal)	9th
5 Jul 2019	Hattah Desert Race	3rd
2019	AORC Women's Round	1st
2017	Women's Championnat de France d’enduro	1st
2012	Australian Four Day Enduro	1st

== Social media ==
- https://www.instagram.com/missjessgardiner/
- https://web.facebook.com/Missjessgardiner
- https://twitter.com/jessgardiner737
