= Mabel Lucy Matthews =

British electrical and production engineer

- Born: Mabel Lucy Hanlon; 25 May 1879; Wakefield, England
- Died: 2 February 1970 (aged 90); Herne Hill, Camberwell, London, England
- Occupation: Electrical engineer
- Known for: Electrical Association for Women

Mabel Lucy Matthews AIEE (née Hanlon) (25 May 1879 – 2 February 1970) was a British electrical and production engineer, instigator of idea for the Electrical Association for Women.

== Biography ==
Matthews was born Mabel Lucy Hanlon in Elm Street in Wakefield on 25 May 1879. Matthews grew up in Yorkshire and Cheshire. Her father was a Chelsea Pensioner and she was his second daughter. His position meant he later worked as the gatekeeper for various government departments in Whitehall. She married Richard Matthews in 1901 and they lived in Barrow-in-Furness where he worked as a company secretary. He died in 1909 and Matthews moved to live mostly with her parents and sister, living in Burlington House Piccadilly. She took clerical work and began working for a paper makers’ engineering company.

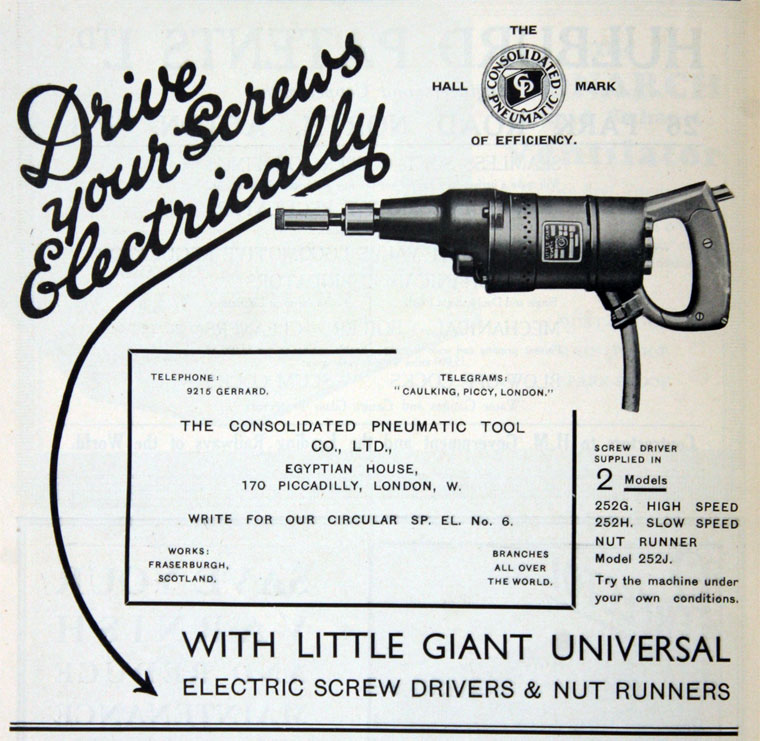
Little Giant Electric drills from the Consolidated Pneumatic Tool Co Ltd in 1929

== Consolidated Pneumatic Tool Co Ltd ==
By 1923 Matthews was in charge of the Electrical department of the Consolidated Pneumatic Tool Co Ltd. The company factory was in Scotland but their head office was in The Egyptian Building in Piccadilly. Matthews went on to become the manager of the company. She was not known to have any formal engineering qualifications. But by 1923 she had enough technical experience to get graduate membership of the Institute of Electrical Engineers. She became an Associate in 1930. She gave the company presentations and talks on the specialist equipment on coalmining drills and welding. Matthews was a very early member of the Women's Engineering Society, (founded in 1919) giving talks to the membership as early as 1922.

== Electrical Association for Women ==
Matthews suggested a scheme to popularise the domestic use of electricity in 1924. She talked about getting the idea because of a conversation about hard work while working on a farm during the war. Most people didn't know how to use the electric appliances that were only newly being brought to all parts of the UK. Matthews presented the idea to the Institute of Electrical Engineers in her associate requirement paper, but they turned the proposal down, as did the Electrical Development Association, (formed in 1919) stating that they felt the time was not ripe for such an organisation.

Matthews next approached Caroline Haslett, Secretary of the Women's Engineering Society (WES). Haslett's reaction was very enthusiastic and she took it to the then President of WES, Lady Katharine Parsons, who was less enthusiastic but was persuaded to give the idea her support. A meeting was set up for 12 November 1924, at the London home of Lady Parsons, with attendees made up of leading figures in the world of engineering and women's organisations, including Sir Charles Parsons, Lord Headley, Sir Alfred Yarrow, Mr. F. S. Button, Mr J. Beauchamp (Director of EDA), Mr B. Llewelyn Atkinson (Cable Makers Association), Margaret Partridge (WES member, electrical engineer and company director), Miss T. J. Dillon and Miss Hilda Shaw from the world of domestic science, Miss B. J. Lanfear of the Incorporated Municipal Electrical Association, with representatives from the Girl Guides, the Women's Co-operative Guild, the Garden Cities and Town Planning Association, the Headmistresses’ Association; the National Union of Women Teachers, the National Council of Women and the National Women Citizens’ Association. Mrs Matthews read her paper to the meeting.

When I was haymaking during the war, an old farm hand came to me and said, "Now ma'am, this is a job where you can work hard or you can work light, what you want is to work light". I’ve never forgotten that, and I look round and see lots of women working hard when they might work "light" with equally effective results. This is where electricity can help: and not only in regard to work but in health, hygiene and greater comfort in the home. The average middle-class housewife and prosperous working women are very shrewd and thrifty persons but they are very much apt to overlook the fact that thrift of one’s energies is often more vital than thrift of money. It is by this form of thrift that electricity in going to help women.

What was termed "a lively discussion" followed Matthew's speech and the meeting ended with a resolution, proposed by Margaret Partridge and agreed unanimously "…to form a Women’s Electrical Association" and wishing "to put on record its thanks to Mrs Matthews".

The Women's Electrical Association was formally established in December 1924, with Haslett as its first director. The name was soon changed to the Electrical Association for Women (EAW) in early 1925 to avoid confusion with the acronym of the Workers’ Educational Association

Matthews was also a vice president of the EAW, which finally closed up in 1986, once the objectives were met. Matthews retired in around 1940, and was living in Herne Hill at the end of her life. She died on 2 February 1970 in Camberwell.

== Commemoration ==
A blue plaque was unveiled in Wakefield in November 2024 to honour Matthews, coinciding with the centenary of the foundation of the Electrical Association for Women. It was placed on the Leisure and Community Centre building on York Street, which overlooks the children's playground now on the site of the Elm Street house where she was born once stood.
