= London Ladies' Motor Club =

English women's motorcycle club

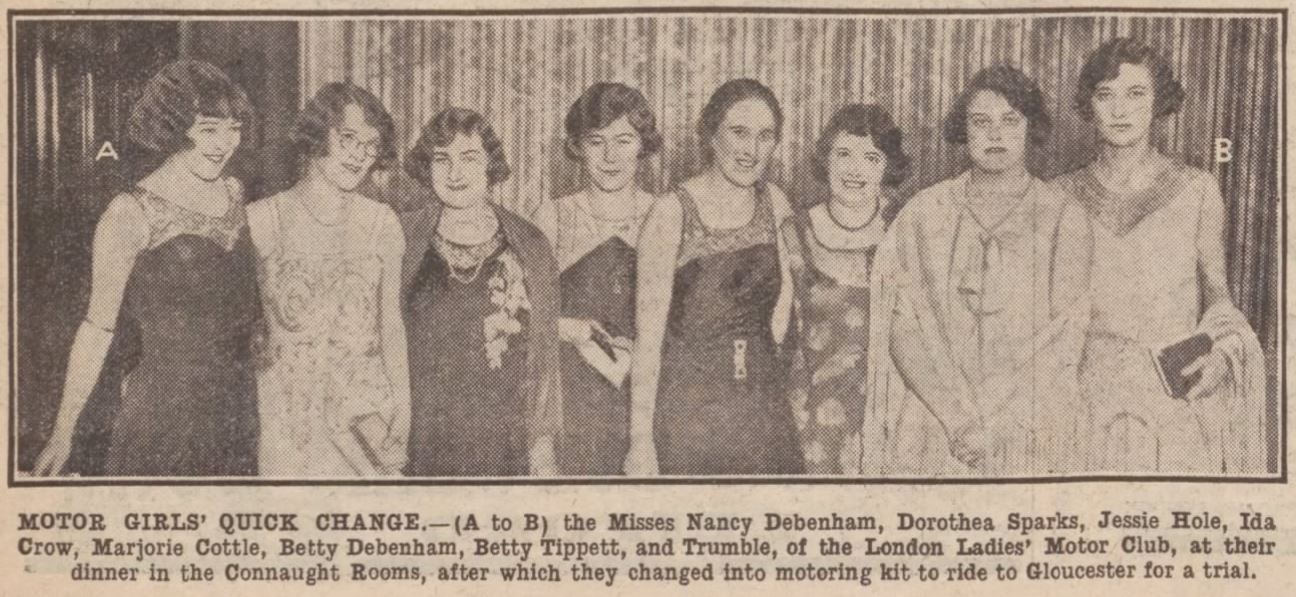
Eight of the club members dining at the Connaught Rooms in 1930

The London Ladies' Motor Club (sometimes referred to as the London Ladies Motor Cycle Club) was a motorcycle club for women based in London, England, founded in 1926 (or 1927), and affiliated with the Auto-Cycle Union.

The club was founded by well-known racer and stunt rider Jessie Hole (later Jessie Ennis). The club president was Kathleen Pelham Burn (Countess of Drogheda), and Betty Debenham acted as the press secretary. Other notable members included Nancy Debenham, Marjorie Cottle, Mrs Victor Bruce and Violette Cordery.

In 1927, the club's team was victorious at the Archery Sports motorcycle trial, beating several teams of men. In 1928, another team of club members won the first motorcycle race organised exclusively for women, held at the Brooklands track and organised by the Essex Motor Club. The club went on to organize their own events, including trials and races, for both men and women. In 1931 they planned a forty-mile race in Surrey and Kent in which men competed and the club members officiated. In 1935 they announced the first women-only team trials event. The club also organised recreational events for its members.

Starting in 1930, the club published a magazine for its members.
