= Electrical Association for Women =

British feminist and educational organisation

- Abbreviation: EAW
- Formation: 1924
- Founder: Mabel Lucy Matthews; Caroline Haslett
- Dissolved: 1986
- Legal status: Charity
- Purpose: Educating middle- and working-class women on benefits of electricity in homes
- Region served: United Kingdom

The Electrical Association for Women (EAW) was a women's educational organisation founded in Great Britain in 1924 to promote the benefits of electricity in the home.

== History ==
The Electrical Association for Women developed in 1924 from a proposal by electrical engineer Mabel Lucy Matthews and taken up by Caroline Haslett at the Women's Engineering Society, having been initially rejected by the Institution of Electrical Engineers and the Electrical Development Association. The organisation focused on ‘emancipation from drudgery’ by extending the benefits of electrification to middle class and working class homes and to engage women's experience in the design of electric appliances and model homes.

The first meeting to develop the organisation, at this time called the Women's Electrical Association, was held on 12 November 1924 at 1 Upper Brook Street, home of Lady Katharine Parsons. Attendees were leading figures in the world of engineering and women's organisations, including Sir Charles Parsons, Lord Headley, Sir Alfred Yarrow, Mr. F. S. Button, Mr J Beauchamp (Director of EDA), Mr B. Llewelyn Atkinson (Cable Makers Association), Margaret Partridge (WES member, electrical engineer and company director), Miss T J Dillon and Miss Hilda Shaw from the world of domestic science, Miss B J Lanfear of the Incorporated Municipal Electrical Association, with representatives from the Girl Guides, the Women's Co-operative Guild, the Garden Cities and Town Planning Association, the Headmistresses’ Association; the National Union of Women Teachers, the National Council of Women and the National Women Citizens’ Association. Beatrice Irwin "gave a delightful picture of the American Labour-saving home" as part of the discussion. Mabel Matthews read a paper outlining her concept of using electricity to lessen the burden on women to the meeting.

“When I was haymaking during the war, an old farm hand came to me and said, “Now ma’am, this is a job where you can work hard or you can work light, what you want is to work light”. I’ve never forgotten that, and I look round and see lots of women working hard when they might work “light” with equally effective results. This is where electricity can help: and not only in regard to work but in health, hygiene and greater comfort in the home. The average middle-class housewife and prosperous working women are very shrewd and thrifty persons but they are very much apt to overlook the fact that thrift of one’s energies is often more vital than thrift of money. It is by this form of thrift that electricity in going to help women.”

What was termed "a lively discussion" followed Matthew's speech and the meeting ended with a resolution, proposed by Margaret Partridge and agreed unanimously “…to form a Women's Electrical Association” and wishing “to put on record its thanks to Mrs Matthews”.

The name was soon changed to the Electrical Association for Women to avoid confusion with the acronym of the Workers’ Educational Association.

== Projects ==
The EAW campaigned for more electrical outlets in homes, and better electrical safety as well as education on the range and benefits of electrical applications in the home.

The EAW published a magazine The Electrical Age (known as The Electrical Age for Women from June 1926 -1932), edited by Caroline Haslett. The EAW commissioned the then architect and designer Carmen Dillon, (later Oscar winning film art director and production designer) to design the front cover of the magazine.

The EAW commissioned an electric flat for the Bachelor Girl in 1930, which was designed by Edna Mosley, ARIBA, an architect and member of the EAW. In 1932, the Association made a small scale-model of an electrical working-class kitchen at an exhibition at Central Hall, Westminster, sponsored by the voluntary Housing Societies of London.

In 1934, the EAW published the Electrical Handbook for Women. It sold 33,000 copies in that year, and remained in print (in updated form) until the 1980s. The handbook was aimed at its female lecturers and demonstrators whose jobs were to guide Britain’s housewives on the best and most efficient ways to electrically equipping their homes. It is considered to be the first book published in Britain aimed at technically-minded women. The first five editions featured a cover designed by art-deco illustrator Ethel “Bip” Pares.

Among its other projects were the 1934 report Electricity in the Working-Class Home, the 1935 all-electric house in Bristol, the 1936 film Motion Study in the Home and the Electrical Housecraft School, run by Dorothy Vaughan, which opened in 1933. In 1935, time and motion study expert Anne Gillespie Shaw worked with the EAW to produce an experimental film demonstrating the application of motion study to food preparation in the home.

The EAW held annual conferences and Summer Schools of Electrical Housecraft, and had a network of member branches across Britain, and abroad.

The Netherlands branch was set up on 7 September 1932 by Rosa Manus, initially called Vrouwen Electriciteits Vereeniging (Women’s Electricity Association) and renamed Nederlandse Vrouwen Electriciteits Vereniging (Dutch Women’s Electricity Association) in 1933. The organisation ran until 1973 and its magazine Bulletin was published eight times a year until 1970.

The Australian organisation in 1934 by electrical engineer Florence Violet McKenzie and the New Zealand branch in 1960. The Trinidad and Tobago branch was set up in 1961 by Public Relations Officer of Trinidad and Tobago Electricity Commission, Mrs. Louise Buxo and is still in operation.

The EAW published recipe books, ran courses on Electricity for Everyday Living and developed an Electrical Housecraft Certificate and diploma course. They created informational films to help educate women in how electricity could relieve their domestic drudgery.

The EAW showcased the great possibilities of domestic electricity at large public events, including the international Empire Exhibition in Glasgow held between May and December 1938.

In the 1950s and 60s, they produced series of tea towels, pinnies and dusters to inform women about electrical safety.

The British EAW organisation was wound up in 1986.

== Membership ==
Its first director was Caroline Haslett, and its first patron was Lady Astor. Members included Laura Annie Willson, Margaret Moir, Lady Katharine Parsons, Lady Eleanor Shelley-Rolls, Annette Ashberry and Margaret Partridge. Many were women who had worked in industry in World War I and continued their interest in peacetime. Mrs Pender Chalmers was a Vice-Chairman for some time.

Branches were established in Glasgow and Birmingham in 1925. In 1926 the Manchester and Cheltenham branches were founded followed by South Wales and Monmouthshire and the North East Coast branches in 1927. 1928 saw branches formed in Ashford; Leeds and West Riding; North Wales; Rugby and Hampshire. Branches were formed in Swansea; Mid-Gloucestershire; North Staffordshire; Bristol; East Devon; Hartlepool; Edinburgh and Plymouth in 1929, followed in 1930 by branches in Bradford and Torquay. There were 100 EAW branches by 1949, with a national membership of 10,000. By 1960 there were 202, and 262 in 1971.

== Directors ==
- Caroline Haslett (1924 - 1956)
- Mary George (1956 - 1976)
- Ann McMullan (1976 - 1986);
- Norah Riddington (1986).

== Presidents ==
Terms of EAW Presidential office: Nancy, Lady Astor (1924-1928); Mrs Wilfrid Ashley, Lady Mount Temple (1928 -1931); Margaret, Lady Moir (1931-1935).

- Lady Astor;
- The Lady Mount Temple;
- Margaret, Lady Moir;
- The Dowager Marchioness of Reading;
- The Dowager Lady Swaythling
- The Viscountess Kilmuir (later Countess De La Warr).

== Vice-Presidents ==
- Dame Elizabeth Cadbury;
- The Hon Lady Cripps;
- The Hon Mrs Ferranti Kirkwood;
- Mrs M L Matthews (Mabel Matthews who came up with the idea of the EAW);
- Marjorie, Lady Pentland;
- The Viscountess Rhondda;
- Catherine, Countess of Westmoreland;
- Margaret Wintringham MP, (second woman, and the first British-born woman, to take her seat in the House of Commons).

== Notable members ==
The campaigning Labour MP Ellen Wilkinson (1891-1947) was involved with the EAW from its inception. The Electrical Age for Women recorded her 1934 speech at their annual lunch in which that she felt "that the twin keys to women's earthly paradise were the Vote and Electricity… which will enable the poorer working families to have the benefits of electric help in their homes and for education which will enable all women to make best use of the help electricity offers."

Mary E. Dillon was an American businesswoman and President of Brooklyn Borough Gas Company, the first female president of any utility company in the world. She joined the EAW soon after its inception and visited from America in 1925.

Industrialist and businesswoman Ella Hudson Gasking was President of the Isle of Wight branch of the Electrical Association of Women.

Gertrude de Ferranti was Chair of the EAW's North Wales Branch and later Chair of Council.

Beatrice Shilling was an early member, joining whilst an apprentice for Margaret Partridge, installing wiring and generators. In January 1928, she wrote an article for The Electrical Age, with fellow apprentice Mona Willis, entitled "How We Wired a House in Paradise", describing their efforts to install eight lights over three days in an old house. In 1929, she wrote another article for the magazine, explaining how to make a home wireless set. Both pieces were aimed at Girl Guides.

In 1928, Jeanie Dicks was a founder member and Honorary Secretary of the Hampshire EAW branch.

Norah Balls was the Chairman of the North-East Coast branch.

== Headquarters ==
In 1927, the EAW moved into headquarters in the Kensington and Knightsbridge Electricity Lighting Co. Ltd., owned by electrical engineer Colonel R E Crompton. When Lady Nancy Astor MP formally opened the new offices on 14 November 1927, she was presented with a bouquet which was lit up by electricity. In 1933, the EAW moved to share their new headquarters at 20 Regent Street in London with the Women's Engineering Society and proudly described the then high tech electrical facilities available to members. "The kitchen cabinet fitment designed by [architect] Edna Mosely [sic] A.R.I.B.A. has a control panel with one 15 amp and three 5 amp plug points above the working table; the wall behind the panel is hollow and the wiring of the panel may be seen through a glass window”. The offices moved to Grosvenor Place in 1944 and the final headquarters from 1955-1986 were at Foubert's Place.

== Archives ==
The archives of the Electrical Association for Women, including the full run of The Electrical Age, are held at the Institution of Engineering and Technology. The archives for the Chesterfield, Derby and Matlock EAW branches are held by the Derbyshire Record Office. The entire run of The Electrical Age has been digitised and was put online in 2024.
