= Erik Lindbom =

Swedish footballer

Senior career*
Years	Team	Apps	(Gls)
- Djurgården
- * Club domestic league appearances and goals

Erik Lindbom is a Swedish retired footballer. Lindbom made 21 Allsvenskan appearances for Djurgården (where he played in the late 1920s and early 1930s) and scored 16 goals.
