= Francis Shelmerdine =

British aviator and civil servant

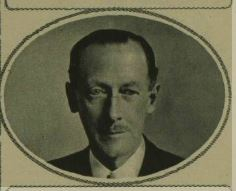
Shelmerdine in the late 1930s.

Lieutenant Colonel Sir Francis Claude Shelmerdine CIE, OBE, FRAeS (25 October 1881 – July 1945) was a senior officer in the Royal Flying Corps during the First World War and a civil servant working in connection with civil aviation in the post-war years. Most significantly, he was Director-General of Civil Aviation during the 1930s.

== Early life ==
Francis Claude Shelmerdine was born at Churchill, Chipping Norton, Oxfordshire on 25 October 1881, son of the Rev. Nathaniel and Mrs Emma Shelmerdine. He had an older brother and sister, Nathaniel and Constance, and one younger sister, Edith. He was educated at Rugby School and then at Sandhurst.

He was commissioned a second lieutenant from the Royal Military College, Sandhurst, in January 1901. He subsequently lived in South Africa, and worked as a cotton planter.

== First World War ==
Shelmerdine served in France and in Egypt and in November 1915, was transferred from Alexandra, Princess of Wales's Own Yorkshire Regiment (unofficially known as the Green Howards at that time) to the Royal Flying Corps.

In 1919, as a Lieutenant-Colonel, Shelmerdine joined the staff of the Civil Aviation Department at the Air Ministry. When Brigadier-General Festing was Controller of Aerodromes and Licences, Shelmerdine became his assistant, and when the department became a directorate and Festing left, Shelmerdine took on the role. He was later dispatched to Cairo to ensure the smooth-running of the Cairo to Karachi air service.

In 1927 he was posted to India, to serve as the Director of Civil Aviation there.

He returned to the Air Ministry in 1931 as the home country's Director of Civil Aviation following the death of Sir Sefton Branker who was killed in the R101 airship crash.

Shelmerdine was Director General of Civil Aviation from 1934 to 1941, when he had to retire under age regulations.

== Personal life ==
He was married to Mary Cecily O'Nolan-Martin in Durban, South Africa, (where he was working as a cotton planter) in 1908. There was one child, Rosamonde, born in London in 1910, who lived solely with her mother from 1911. He disputed her parentage, and there was a court case in 1912. His drug habit was cited in this case. Mary Cecily filed for divorce in 1924.

He was subsequently married to Lillian Sealey Playne, formerly Hanham, (née Haskins), Lady Shelmerdine (17 September 1884 – 11 July 1956) at St George's Hanover Square in 1925.

He was knighted in 1936.

He died in Bideford, Devon.

Government offices
Preceded by Sir Sefton Brancker	Director-General of Civil Aviation; Initially as Director (1931–34); 1931–1941	Succeeded by Sir William Hildred
