= Betty and Nancy Debenham =

English motorcyclists and sports journalists

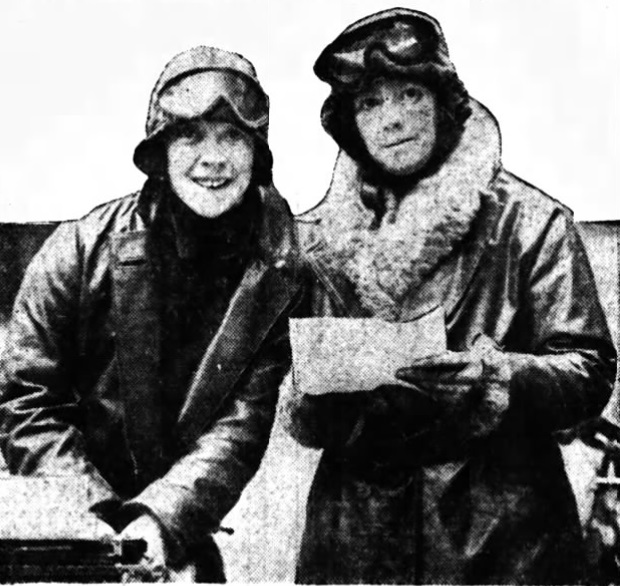
The Debenham sisters on their 2,000 mile tour in 1929

Betty (born 30 November 1895) and Nancy Warner Debenham (born 1897) were English sisters, motorcyclists, and sports journalists. The sisters were heirs to the Debenhams department store fortune, and were both attached to the BSA works team.

== Motorcyclists ==
By 1923, the two were already well-known colourful figures, sometimes working as stunt riders to promote motorcycle sales at events such as the Olympia Motor Show. In 1924 Betty Debenham completed a 500-mile trial on a 1.25 horsepower motorcycle from London to York and back, and then to Brighton and back.

By 1926, they had both become formidable racers, and were competing in events across the country. They competed in their first trials in February, winning gold (Betty) and silver (Nancy) cups. Each earned a silver cup in August's London-to-Barnstaple trial, riding 2.25 horsepower BSA motorcycles. A few weeks later, Nancy Debenham came out on top in a 200-mile reliability trial organized by the London Motor Cycling Club involving about 40 riders, mostly men.

In 1929, the pair made a wager with racing driver Kaye Don that they could complete a 2,000 mile tour without spending any of their own money. They set off south from London in February, but were forced to turn back due to snow. Having already completed 600 miles in wintery conditions, and earned a few shillings helping stranded motorists, they headed north and encountered better weather. They made more money by posing for photographs and writing about their journey, and at one point delivered a tyre for a local garage in exchange for petrol and oil.

== Writers ==
In 1928, the Debenhams published a book entitled Motor-Cycling for Women. Based on their extensive experience, the slim book is part travel guide, part manual, and part shopping guide.

Motor-cycling is an ideal hobby for the tired business girl. She can seek health and pleasure during her precious week-ends by exploring the countryside and the seaside. She can gather her violets and primroses from the woods instead of buying them in jaded twopenny bunches, and her whole week-end's holiday need only cost her the price of her return fare to Brighton.

Betty Debenham was press secretary for the London Ladies' Motor Club.

== Later life ==
Betty Debenham went on to become a golf writer for the Daily Sketch and, in 1938, was a founding member of the Association of Golf Writers.
