= Silver Hawk (car) =

Silver Hawk Motors of Cobham, Surrey, England, was a motor manufacturer from 1920 until 1921. It was founded by Sir (Albert) Noel Campbell Macklin after he parted company with his Eric-Campbell project, and before he founded both the Invicta and Railton car marques. The cars were built in a garage at Macklin's private home.

The car was a stylish high performance sporting design but the company's lack of both industrial backing and a volume selling standard model meant that the project was short-lived.

== Silver Hawk car ==
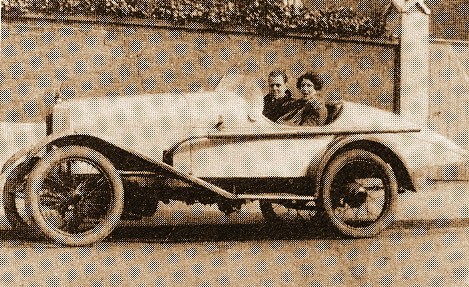

The Silver Hawk was similar to Macklin's previous Eric-Campbell design. It had a stylish aluminium body, external exhaust and used a tuned and lightened 1498 cc side-valve engine made by Coventry-Simplex rated at 10/35 hp that drove the rear wheels through a cone clutch and three- or four-speed transmission. The suspension used semi-elliptic leaf springs at the front and cantilever springs at the rear.

Around 12 cars were made.

== Competition ==
In 1920 Violette Cordery drove a Silver Hawk in the 1500 cc ‘light cars’ class at the South Harting hill climb. She won the ladies' race at the Junior Car Club May meeting in 1921 at a speed of 49.7 mph (80.0 km/h), probably in a Silver Hawk.

A team of three cars was entered for the 1920 Coupe des Voiturettes at Le Mans. Two cars finished in 6th and 7th places.
