= John O. Lyle =

British businessman

- Born: 1918
- Died: 1985 (aged 66–67); Eastbourne, East Sussex
- Education: Clare College
- Occupation: Businessman
- Known for: Executive for Tate & Lyle
- Spouse: Jill
- Parents: Oliver Lyle (father); Lilian Isabel (mother)
- Military career
- Allegiance: United Kingdom
- Branch: Royal Air Force
- Rank: Second lieutenant
- Unit: No. 234 Squadron RAF
- Conflicts: World War II

John O. Lyle (1918–1985) was a British businessman who was executive chairman of the British sugar group Tate & Lyle from 1964 to 1978.

== Early life and education ==
The son of Oliver Lyle and Lilian Isabel (née Spicer), John Lyle attended Uppingham School and Clare College, Cambridge. During World War II, he trained as a fighter pilot and was promoted as Second Lieutenant in June 1940, joining No. 234 Squadron RAF, which re-equipped with Spitfires the same year.

== Career ==
Lyle joined the family sugar firm in 1945, working initially at the firm's Plaistow refinery in east London before moving to the Tate & Lyle head office in 1949, and joining the firm's board in 1951. He became executive chairman of Tate & Lyle in 1964, and that year oversaw Tate & Lyle's acquisition of United Molasses for £30M, even though he was then new to the company, and comparatively young. He was involved with new developments in the US and Canada, as well as the traditional interests of the company on the Clyde and the Thames. The deal he worked out gave Tate & Lyle the largest shipping fleet in the world.

UK sugar shortages saw Lyle become active in politics and the media opposing Common Market Organization for Sugar policies favouring beet sugar over the British cane sugar. The then Government, preferring the EEC approach, subsidised Tate & Lyle with an £8M annual subsidy in compensation for pursuing its European policies. In November 1974, Lyle warned there could be no sugar for the British home market during a workers' blockade of the Tate & Lyle Silvertown refinery, which halted supplies across southern England. Workers were not allowing sugar to reach shops, protesting against Common Market regulations which could lead to thousands of British job losses. Lyle told The Times, "We can no longer keep silent while the company and its customers are threatened by the policies and procedures of the EEC system."

Also during the 1970s, Lyle was forced to defend Tate & Lyle's short-lived activities in apartheid-era South Africa. Under his chairmanship, Tate & Lyle had acquired a sugar business, Illovo, in early 1969. On 12 March 1973, a Guardian report by Adam Raphael, "British firms pay Africans starvation rate", listed nine companies including Tate & Lyle whose subsidiaries paid low wages. As company chairman, Lyle defended the company's position in a letter to The Times on 15 March 1973. Four years later, a 1977 ATV series by Antony Thomas, The South Africa Experience, highlighted malpractices by British firms including Tate & Lyle. The company attempted to block broadcast of the series' third film, titled "Working for Britain", and Lyle used an advertisement in the Daily Express to claim the film "contain[ed] grossly distorted statements which combine to give a totally unrepresentative picture". In 1977, Tate & Lyle sold its 49.25% shareholding in Illovo Sugar Estates to C G Smith (Sugars) of Natal; Lyle told shareholders: "The decision to terminate our association with raw sugar production in South Africa was taken with reluctance." He also said the company had been reducing its shipping fleet "to those ships necessary for servicing the Group's activities".

Lyle stepped down as executive chairman in 1978, when Lord Jellicoe took his place. Lyle then became president of the company until his retirement in 1983.

During the Thatcher years, Lyle supported Government policy, and was active and influential in politics. In 1984, he met with the Prime Minister in 1984 in connection with Aims of Industry in 1984.

Lyle was a member of the Institute of Directors, a keen cricketer and a supporter of Kent County Cricket Club. Married to his wife Jill, he lived in Rotherfield in East Sussex. He died in Eastbourne, East Sussex.
