= Benzol =

Benzol may refer to:

- Benzole, a coal-tar product consisting mainly of benzene and toluene
- Benzene, a chemical compound with the formula C_{6}H_{6}
- Benzol peroxide, benzoyl peroxide
- Benzoyl group, a functional group with the formula C_{6}H_{5}CO
- Benzyl group, a molecular fragment with the formula C_{6}H_{5}CH_{2}
- Phenol (systematically named Benzenol), an aromatic organic compound with the molecular formula C_{6}H_{5}OH
- Benzoic acid, an acidic compound with the formula C_{6}H_{5}COOH
- Benzyl alcohol, an alcohol with the formula C_{6}H_{5}CH_{2}OH
- Cresol (also called Benzol), also known as hydroxytoluene, a group of isomeric alcohols

== See also ==
- National Benzole, a petroleum brand used in the UK from 1919 to the 1960s
