= Eric-Campbell =

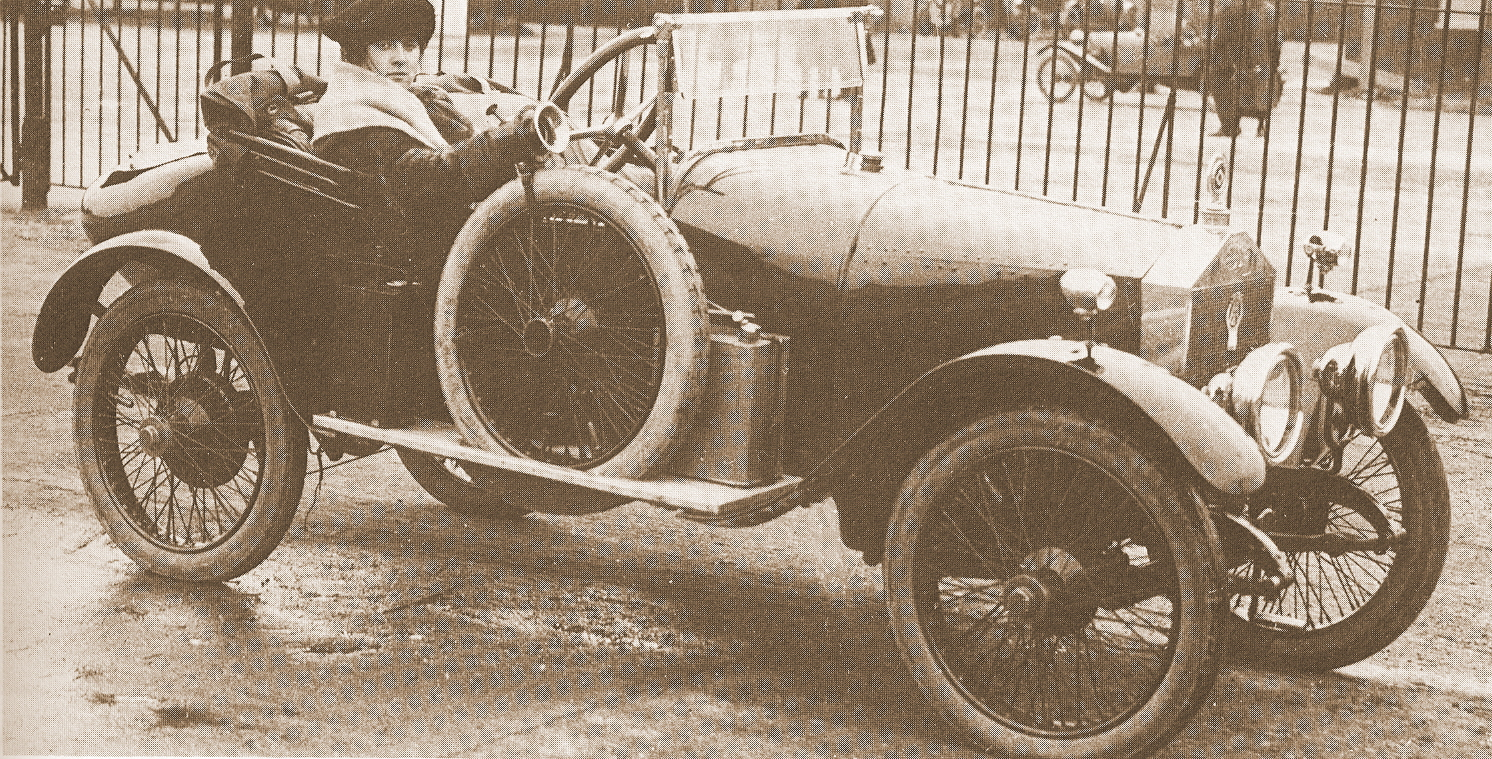

Overview
- Manufacturer: Eric, Campbell & Co Ltd; Vulcan Iron Works
- Production: 1919–1926

Powertrain
- Engine: 1498 cc in-line 4 cylinder
- Transmission: three speed manual

Dimensions
- Wheelbase: 102 in (2,591 mm)
- Length: 144 in (3,658 mm)

Chronology
- Successor: none

The Eric-Campbell was a British car made from 1919 to 1924 by Eric-Campbell & Co Limited of Cricklewood, London. The company was formed by H Eric Orr-Ewing and Noel Campbell Macklin.

== Manufacturing ==
Eric-Campbell was formed by H Eric Orr-Ewing and Noel Campbell Macklin. Macklin subsequently founded Silver Hawk, Invicta and Railton car manufacturers. Manufacturing took place in the factory of the Handley Page aircraft company in Cricklewood London. It is estimated that as many as 500 cars might have been made.

=== Demise ===
Macklin left the company in 1920 to concentrate on his Silver Hawk car and by 1921 Eric-Campbell were in financial difficulties. In 1922 production was taken over by Vulcan Iron & Metal Works Limited of Southall, Middlesex. Prices were reduced and a wider range of bodies offered. In its last year of 1924, Anzani engines could be ordered as well as the Coventry-Simplex.

The new owners failed to make a success of the company and the receivers were called in during January 1926.

== Eric-Campbell 10 ==
The Eric-Campbell 10 (10/22 in 1924) was assembled from bought-in components with a Coventry-Simplex 1498 cc, four cylinder, side valve engine driving the rear wheels through a cone clutch and three speed Moss gearbox. The engine was tuned with a special camshaft and lightened pistons. Half elliptic leaf springs were fitted at the front whilst at the rear cantilever springing was used. A top speed of 55 mph was guaranteed and 60 mph claimed as possible. Two seat polished aluminium bodies were fitted with a simulacrum of a Rolls-Royce radiator.

=== Competition ===
Two cars were entered in the tenth Targa Florio race in Sicily, held on 23 November 1919 and comprising 4 laps of the 108 kilometre Madonie circuit. The drivers were Cyril Snipe, who had won the 1912 event driving a SCAT 25/35, and Jack Scales (29 January 1886 – 23 October 1962) who subsequently raced for the Italian marque Chiribiri where he was known as l'Inglese Scalese (The Englishman Scales). Scales, driving car number 23 retired after 1 lap due to a broken steering arm, whilst Snipe did not complete a single lap in car number 24.

In April and May 1920 Violette Cordery took part in two British Motor Cycle Racing Club handicaps driving an Eric-Campbell.

== Eric-Campbell 8 ==
An 8 hp car, the 8/20, with 1075 cc engine was announced in 1924 but it seems not to have reached production.
