= Dewar Trophy =

The Dewar Trophy
- Awarded for: "Outstanding British technical achievement in the automotive field during the preceding year"
- Presented by: Royal Automobile Club
- First award: 1906
- Currently held by: Cosworth
- Website: https://www.royalautomobileclub.co.uk/motoring/trophies-and-awards/the-dewar-trophy/

The Dewar Trophy is a cup donated in the early years of the twentieth century by Sir Thomas R. Dewar, MP, to be awarded each year by the Royal Automobile Club (RAC) of the United Kingdom "to the motor car which should successfully complete the most meritorious performance or test furthering the interests and advancement of the automobile industry".

The Dewar Trophy Technical Committee, who are responsible for the awarding of the trophy also award the Simms Medal at the same time as the Dewar Trophy. The Simms medal is awarded "for ‘An Outstanding Contribution to Motoring Innovation’. The Royal Automobile Club Simms Medal is named after the Club’s founding member Frederick Simms and is awarded to recognise a genuine contribution to motoring innovation by individuals or small companies".

== Winners ==
Some of the trophy winners include:

- 1906 – Dennis Bros Ltd, for the long-distance trial of their 20 hp Dennis car, a non-stop run of over 4,000 miles.
- 1907 – Rolls-Royce Limited, for 40.50 hp model covering 15,000 Miles
- 1908 – Cadillac, for parts interchangeability. The award was actually presented in 1909.
- 1909 – Daimler, for their Knight sleeve-valve engine.
- 1910 – S F Edge, for the 59.9-hp Napier that performed the London to Edinburgh and back top-gear trial.
- 1911 – The Thomas Transmission Limited, for the 2,000 mile trial of a lorry and a 13.96-hp car on the London-Edinburgh and back trial. Both fitted with Thomas Transmission
- 1912 – Cadillac for the electric starter and electric lights.
- 1913 – F.S Bennett Limited, for the 1914 model 32.2hp Cadillac car
- 1914 – The National Steam Company Limited, for the National coke fuel motor lorry consumption tests
- 1920 – The National Benzole Company Limited, for the 10,000 Miles trial
- 1921 – John I Thorneycroft and Company Limited, for the 'BT' type lorry
- 1922 – Armstrong-Siddeley Motors Limited, for 10,000 Miles trial
- 1923 – Rapson Tyre and Jack Company Limited for the Rapson cord tyres and the 40,000 miles trial
- 1925 – Rover Company Limited, for 13,96 hp car, Fifty ascents and descents of Bwlch-y-Groes
- 1926 – Violet Cordery, for the Invicta Car attaining 5,000 miles
- 1928 – C B Wardman, for the Mercedes Benz heavy oil lorry particularly for its consumption and reliability
- 1929 – Violette Cordery, sister-in-law of Noel Macklin, for driving an Invicta for 30,000 Miles at Brooklands
- 1950 – Rover Company Limited, for the Rover JET1 gas turbine powered car.
- 1951 – Jaguar Cars Limited, for performance in four major international events
- 1952 – Sunbeam-Talbot Limited, for performance in 1952 International Alpine Rally
- 1957 – The Dunlop Rubber Company Limited, for its work on disc brake and its research and development of tyre for the MG car, which secured various international speed records
- 1958 – G A Vanderwell, for the design, development, production and performance of the Vanwall car.
- 1959 – BMC and Alec Issigonis, for design and production of Mini
- 1963 – Coventry Climax Engines Ltd, for Grand Prix racing engines. Presented in 1964.
- 1967 – "The Motor Industry Research Association, for carrying out research and initiating development of the load proportioning system of braking to prevent 'jack-knifing' of articulated vehicles"
- 1969 – Cosworth for DFV Formula One engine
- 1971 – "The British Leyland Motor Corporation, coupled with the name of Mr P M Wilkes, for advanced development in Automobile design as exemplified by the Range Rover"
- 1972 – British Leyland Motor Corporation (Truck and Bus Division), for "the design, development and construction of the Leyland National Bus which represented a radical new approach to the development of a public service vehicle incorporating maximum pay-load and security at minimal cost and maintenance"
- 1973 – The Dunlop Company Limited, for "development of DENOVO fail-safe tyre and wheel system, as an outstanding contribution to road safety"
- 1977 – The Triplex Safety Glass Company Limited, for "development, manufacture and application to production automobiles of the Ten Twenty safety glass as an outstanding contribution to the safety of automobile occupants"
- 1981 – British Leyland Cars Limited, for "efficiency in automobile design in respect of the utilisation of interior space and predicted low cost of ownership of the Austin Metro Car"
- 1984 – British Leyland Technology Limited, and the Design Team led by C S King, CBE, for "a convincing demonstration of automobile design possibilities providing opportunities for significant energy savings as embodied in the experimental vehicle ECV3"
- 1985 – Lucas Girling Limited, for "development of anti-lock braking systems for cars, trucks and motorcycles leading to production of the low cost Stop Control System (SCS) for front wheel drive cars"
- 1995 – Rover Group Limited, for "development of the Holovision system to measure and understand the vibration behaviour and their component parts in order to improve vehicle refinement
- 1997 – MIRA, the Motor Industry Research Association, for development of the M-SIS, Side Impact Simulation System"
- 2002 – Ricardo plc, for "development of its I-MoGen (Intelligent Motor Generator) mild hybrid vehicle"
- 2003 – Jaguar Cars, for "development of the all-aluminium body structure for the new XJ Series"
- 2004 – Delphi Corporation, for "development of their twin-floating disc ‘Maximum Torque Brake’ system"
- 2005 – Ricardo plc, for "work on the development of the Dual Clutch Transmission technology as exemplified by the DCT and Active 4WD for the Bugatti Veyron"
- 2006 – The JCB Dieselmax team, for "development of the world diesel land speed record-breaking ‘JCB DIESELMAX’ streamliner"
- 2008 – Group Lotus plc, for "development of its Versatile Vehicle Architecture (VVA) Chassis technology as exemplified in the Lotus Evora sportscar"
- 2009 – Mercedes-Benz High Performance Engines – Formula One Kinetic Energy Recovery Systems (KERS)
- 2012 – Ford Motor Company, for "development of the 1.0-litre Eco-Boost engine"
- 2013 – McLaren Automotive for "development and launch of its advanced sell-out McLaren P1 supercar"
- 2014 – Mercedes-AMG High Performance Powertrains, awarded for the PU106A Hybrid Formula One power unit.
- 2015 – GKN Hybrid Power for the "development and application to buses of Gyrodrive technology"
- 2016 – Gordon Murray and Gordon Murray Design, for the iStream chassis design and the Ox, a flat pack vehicle designed for the Global Vehicle Trust.
- 2017 – Jaguar Cars for the I-Pace Concept battery-electric crossover SUV
- 2018 – Integral Powertrain for their electric motors used by the Volkswagen I.D. R prototype fully electric vehicle
- 2019 – JCB (company) for "the 19C-1E electric mini excavator – the construction industry’s first fully electric mini excavator"
- 2021 – JCB for "the development of its ABH2 hydrogen fuelled motor"
- 2022 – Mercedes-AMG High Performance Powertrains in recognition for "the successful implementation of its Formula One powertrain in the road-legal Mercedes-AMG ONE hypercar"
- 2023 – YASA, for its "revolutionary axial-flux electric motor – technology that puts Britain at the forefront of high-performance, zero-emission cars"
- 2024 – Cosworth, "for developing ultra-high-performance internal-combustion engines to power some of the world’s most exciting hypercars".

== 1908 Trophy-winning performance ==
On Saturday, 29 February 1908, three Model Ks from the 1907 Cadillac production were released from the stock of the Anglo-American Motor-car Company, the UK agent for Cadillac automobiles, at the Heddon Street showroom in London (these were engines Nos. 23391, 24111 and 24118). The three cars, all registered in London under the numbers A2EO, A3EO and A4EO, were driven 25 miles to the Brooklands race track at Weybridge. There, the cars completed ten laps of the track, or approximately 30 miles, before being locked away until Monday, 2 March 1908, when they were released and disassembled completely, using only wrenches, screwdrivers, hammers, and pliers. Each car was reduced to a pile of 721 component parts, which were then scrambled into one heap by the RAC. Eighty-nine parts requiring extreme accuracy were withdrawn from the heap, locked away at the Brooklands club house and replaced with new parts from Anglo-American's showroom stock. The parts were then sorted into three piles, each with all the parts needed to assemble a car. A mechanic – Mr. E. O. Young – reassembled the cars with the help of his assistant – Mr. M. M. Gardner. Sometimes they had to work ankle-deep in water, using only wrenches and screwdrivers. The third car was re-assembled by Thursday morning, 12 March. With the painted parts on the original cars not being identical in color or style, the reassembled cars were mismatched in appearance, gaining the nickname "harlequin cars". By 2 p.m. on Friday 13 March the three cars had completed the mandatory 500-mile run with singular regularity. Only one point was lost owing to a broken cotter pin in the ignition lever (promptly replaced from stock). During the event, it was reported that one of the sheds where the parts were stored became partly flooded during a heavy storm and some parts became rusted. Only oily rags could be used to remove all traces of the immersion. On completion of the test, one of the cars was locked away until the start of the 2000-miles reliability trials in June 1908. It came out the winner of the R.A.C. Trophy for its class. Parts interchangeability had been publicly demonstrated and field tested.

== 1909 Trophy-winning performance ==
Immediately following the introduction of the sleeve-valve principle into the Daimler engine, the Daimler Company in 1909 asked the Royal Automobile Club to frame conditions of a test that should be of unprecedented severity and would demonstrate in the most public manner possible that the new Daimler engine was in every way reliable.

The two engines selected for this test were a 38 and a 22-h.p., having a bore and stroke, respectively, of 124 by 130 mm. and 96 by 130 mm. They were bolted down to the test bench close together in one of the large engine testing shops at the Daimler Works. The section of the shop in which they were placed was railed off and under the sole charge and observation of the R.A.C. officials from the start of the test to the finish. The observers kept watch day and night just as on board a ship, and periodically tested the revolution counters and spring balances to ensure that the engines were always running under full load. Every possible precaution was taken to keep constant and close observation upon the test, and there were never less than two observers on duty.

Both engines were started up at 6 a.m. on Monday, March 22, 1909, and each completed the 132 hours' bench test on the following Saturday evening. To appreciate more clearly the severity of the test, if the larger engine had been driving a car during the whole time, with the standard Daimler gear ratios, a distance of no less than 8,252 miles (13280 km) would have been covered, at a mean speed of 43.45 m.p.h. (69.92 km/h) while the smaller engine would have covered, similarly, a distance of 8,830 miles (14210 km) at 48.4 m.p.h. (77.9 km/h). The disparity in speed and distance between these results is, of course, attributable to the higher rate of revolutions of the smaller engine.

=== Details of the 38-H.P. Engine Test ===
==== First Bench Test ====
The speed of the engine was 1200 r.p.m. giving a limit of 50.0 h.p. below which the h.p. was at no time to fall.

The duration of the test was 5 days 14 hours 15 minutes or 134.25 hours.

There were no stops incurring any penalties.

There were five stops totalling 1 hour and 56 minutes which did not incur any penalty under Rule 6 (2)

The load was eased for a total of 19 minutes for brake adjustments, but the engine was not stopped. Average horse-power recorded, 54.3.

Petrol consumed, 614 gallons equal to .679 pints per horse-power hour.

==== Running Test ====
On completion of the first test, the engine was removed from the bench and fitted under observation to the chassis without any vital parts being disturbed. A standard type four-seater body was fitted and the car proceeded from Coventry to Weybridge – 112 miles (180.2 km). The average weight of the car and passengers on the road was 4,085 lbs = 1 ton 16 cwt 1 qr 25 lbs (1852.9 kg).

The runs on Brooklands track amounted to 1,930.5 miles (3106.8 km)at an average speed of 42.4 mph (68.2 km/h) with an average weight of car and passengers of 3,805 lb (1726 kg). A distance of 5 miles was traversed in running to and from the car-headquarters and the track, and this with the return journey to Coventry made a total mileage of 2,159.5 (3474.5 km).

The petrol consumption on the track was equal to 20.57 m.p.g. and on the road 19.48 m.p.g. The ton-miles per gallon of fuel were 34.94 on the track and 35.97 on the road.

==== Final Bench Test ====
On arrival in Coventry, the engine was replaced on the test bench and run for 5 hours 15 minutes during which there were no stoppages of any description; the load was eased for 15 minutes for brake adjustments.

Average horse-power recorded, 57.25.

Petrol consumed, 22.5 gallons = .599 pints per horse-power hour.

The judges append the following remarks to their certificate: "The engine was completely dismantled, and no perceptible wear was noticeable on any of the fitted surfaces. The cylinders and pistons were found to be notably clean. The only perceptible wear in any part was caused by two joint pins rubbing against adjacent parts. The ports of the valves showed no burning or wear."

=== Details of the 22-H.P. Engine Test ===
==== First Bench Test ====
The speed of the engine was 1,400 r.p.m. giving a limit of 35.3 h.p. below which the h.p. was at no time to fall.

The duration of the test was 5 days 12 hours 58 minutes or 132 hours 58 minutes. There were no stops incurring any penalty.

There were two stops of 17 minutes total duration, which did not incur any penalty under Rule 6 (2) The load was eased for a total of 41 minutes for brake adjustments, but the engine was not stopped. Average horse-power recorded was 38.83.

Petrol consumed, 476.5 gallons equal to .739 pints per h.p. hour.

==== Running Test ====
The conditions for the running test were the same as for the 38-h.p. car test, but with varying figures as to the results.

Average weight of the car and passengers on the road was 3,512.5 lbs (1638.6 kg); on the track, 3,332.5 lb (1511.6 kg).

Distance covered on Brooklands track, 1,914.1 miles (3080.4 km).

Average speed, 41.88 mph (67.4 km/h).

The petrol consumption on the track was equal to 22.44 m.p.g. and on the road 19.48 m.p.g. The ton-miles per gallon of fuel were 33.37 on the track and 31.19 on the road.

The total mileage of 2,143.1 (3449 km).

==== Final Bench Test ====
Duration, 5 hours 2 minutes. No stoppages of any description; the load was eased for 1 minute. Average horse-power recorded, 38.96. Petrol consumed, 18.25 gallons = .749 pints per h.p. hour. The judges append the following remarks to their certificate: "The engine was completely dismantled, and no perceptible wear was noticeable on any of the fitted surfaces. The cylinders and pistons were found to be notably clean. The ports of the valves showed no burning or wear."

== See also ==
- List of motor vehicle awards
- Invicta – Double Dewar Trophy winner: 1926, 1929.
- Fred Marriott – driver of the Stanley Rocket, the car that has held the Land Speed Record for a steam-powered vehicle from 1906 to 2009.
- Ricardo plc – Double Dewar Trophy winner: 2002, 2005.
