= John Charles & Co =

Defunct British company

John Charles & Co was a British coachbuilding company founded in 1932 and based initially near Kew Gardens, London.

== John Charles & Co ==
On the collapse of coachbuilders Chalmer & Hoyer two ex-employees John I. Dalrymple and Charles H. Livesay purchased some of the equipment and set up as a new company John Charles & Co at South Avenue, Sandycombe Road, Kew. They quickly assembled an impressive range of customers and produced a variety of saloons and open bodies on chassis as varied as the Alvis Speed 20, Ford 8, Lagonda M45, Lagonda Rapier, Morris 10, Singer 9, Wolseley Hornet, Railton and Lancia Dilambda.

They took a stand at the London Motor Show in 1933 and 1934. In 1934 they moved to larger premises in Brentford, West London and gained orders from Citroën and Crossley Motors. They also started to use the name Ranalah as a brand name on some of their bodies.

The rapid growth seems to have taken a toll on finances and in early 1935 the company failed.

== Ranalah Coachworks Ltd ==
In 1935 a new company was started in Morden Road, Merton, London SW19 to take over the assets and continue the business of John Charles and named Ranalah Coachworks Ltd taking on the brand name of the old company. Some of the old orders seem also to have moved to the new firm as Railtons were being made almost immediately. A contract was also agreed in 1935 to make Sandringham cabriolets to fit on a variety of chassis. This design was by Vehicle Developments, a company started by H. W. Allingham who had been a founder of Chalmer & Hoyer.

Ranalah exhibited at the London Motor Show from 1936 to 1938.

They also were supplying tooling as advertisements appeared for the Ranalah English wheel.

In 1937 they diversified into sheet metal work for the aircraft industry with an additional address at High Street, Tooting, London SW17 and with the outbreak of war car work stopped.

After the Second World War, the premises were taken over by Rolls-Royce dealer Jack Barclay and occupied by their service department and coachbuilder Gurney Nutting, itself part of the Jack Barclay group.
