= Invicta (car) =

British automobile manufacturer

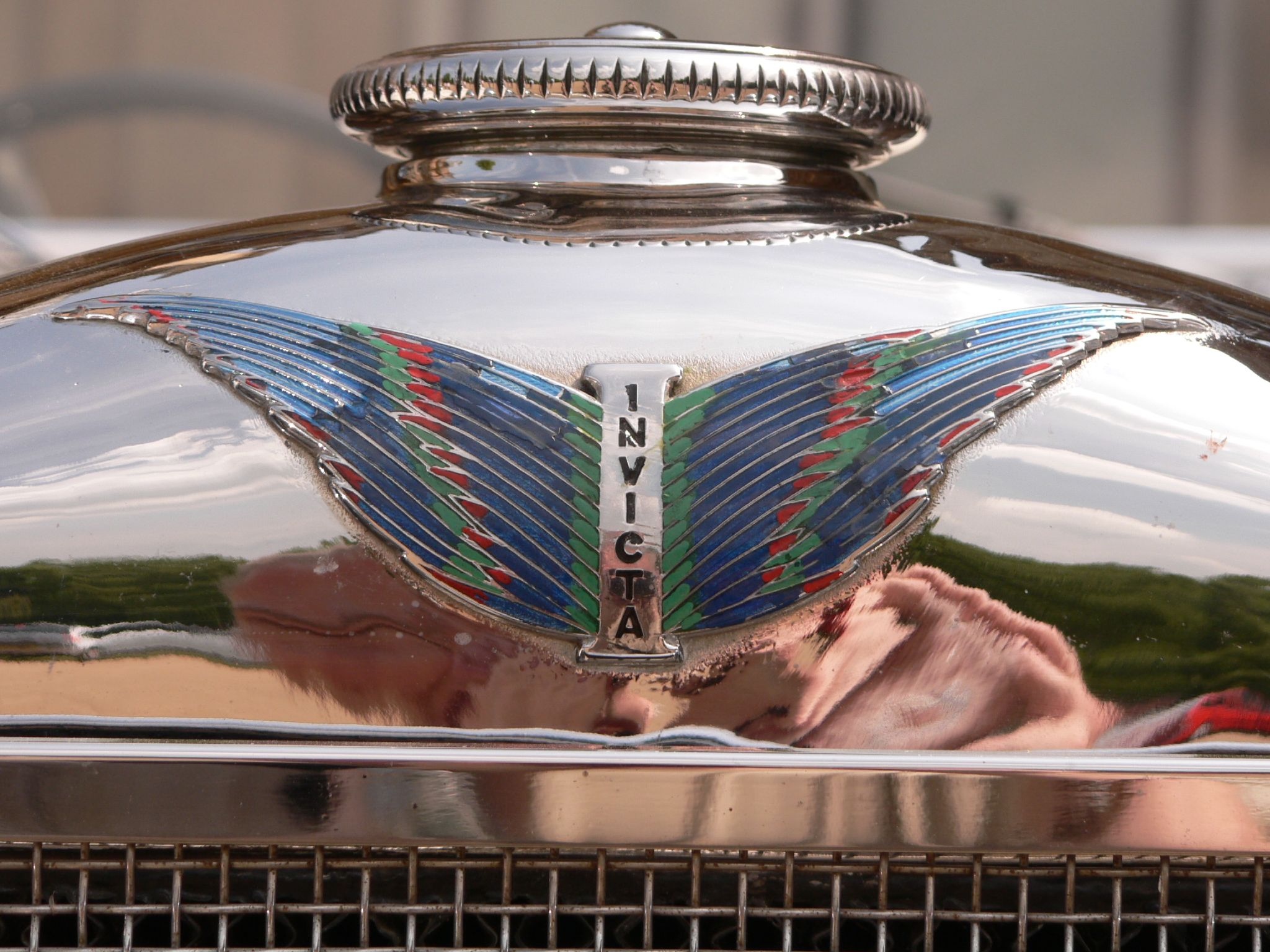
Invicta logo

Invicta is a British automobile manufacturer. The brand has been available intermittently through successive decades. Initially, the manufacturer was based in Cobham, Surrey, England, from 1925 to 1933, then in Chelsea, London, England, from 1933 to 1938 and finally in Virginia Water, Surrey, England, from 1946 to 1950. More recently, the name was revived for the Invicta S1 sports car produced between 2004 and 2012.

== First incarnation ==
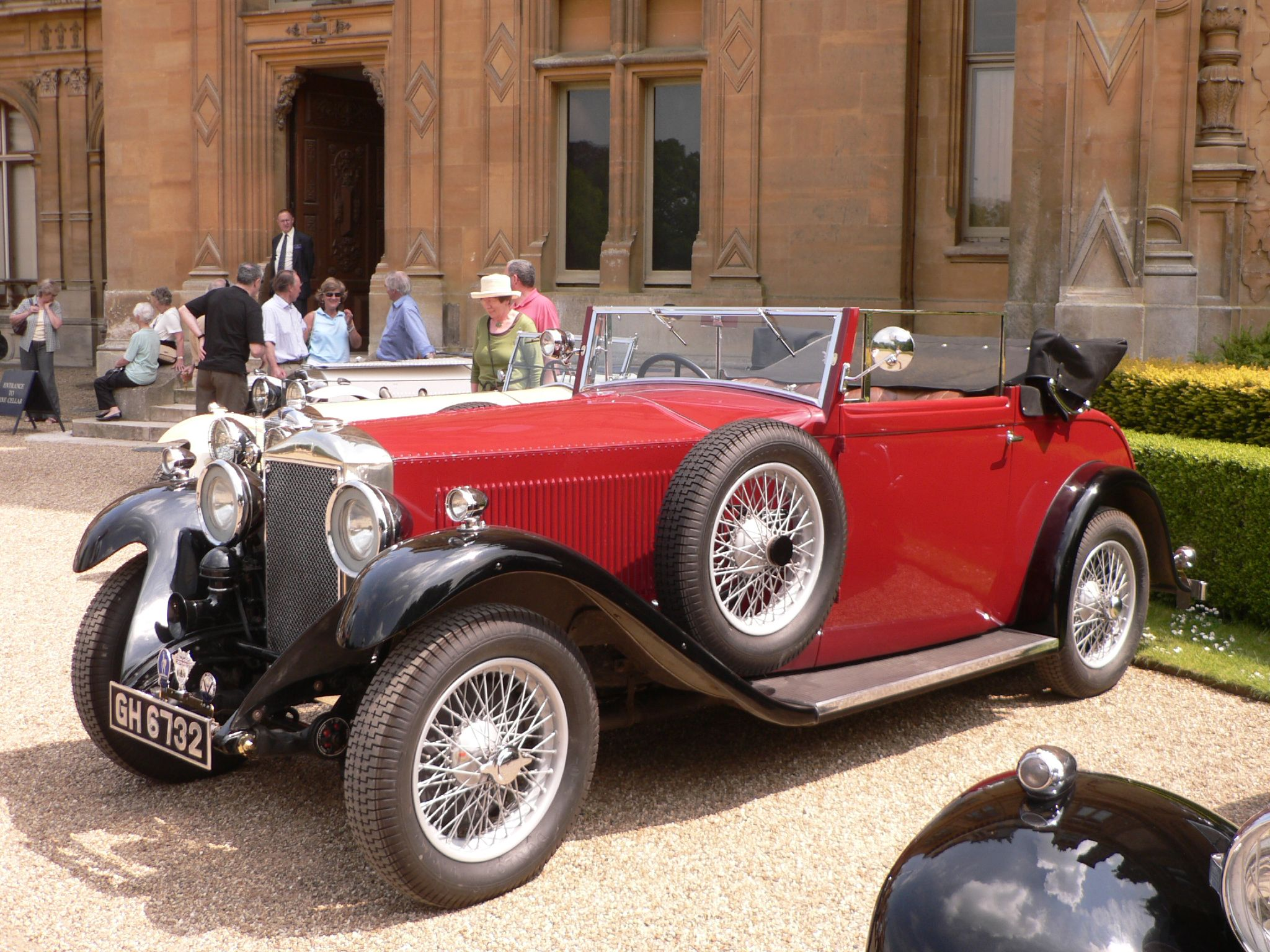
4½ litre long wheelbase NLC, 1932

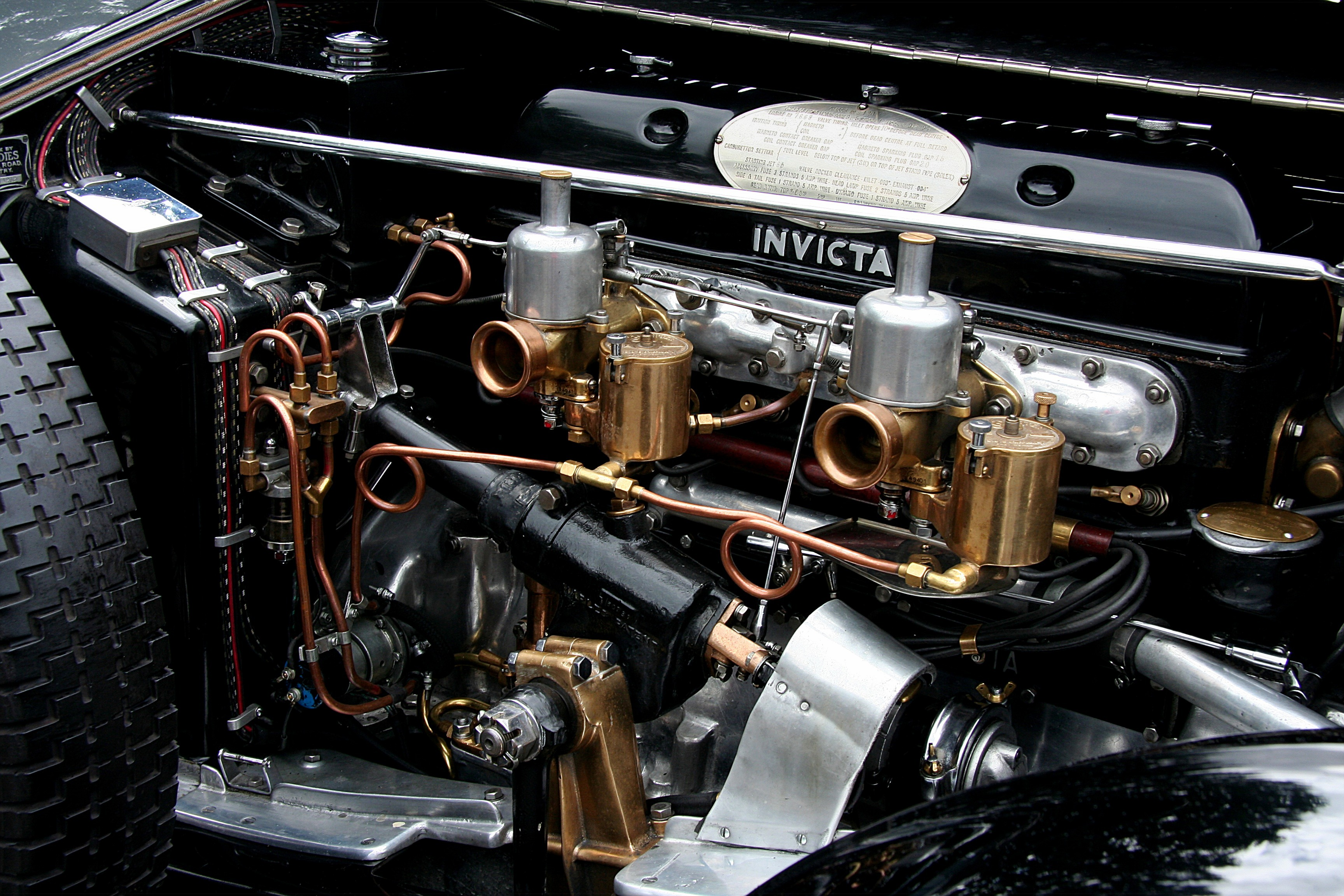
4½ litre Meadows engine in an S-type

This manufacturer was founded by Noel Macklin with Oliver Lyle of the sugar family providing finance. Assembly took place in Macklin's garage at his home at Fairmile Cottage on the main London to Portsmouth road in Cobham, Surrey. Macklin had previously tried car making with Eric-Campbell & Co Limited and his own Silver Hawk Motor Company Limited The Invicta cars were designed to combine flexibility, the ability to accelerate from virtual standstill in top gear, with sporting performance. With the assistance of William (Willie) Watson, his mechanic from pre-World War I racing days, a prototype was built on a Bayliss-Thomas frame with Coventry Simplex engine in the stables of Macklin's house on the western side of Cobham.

=== SC and LC Chassis ===
The first production car, the 1925 2½ litre used a Meadows straight six, overhead-valve engine and four-speed gearbox in a chassis with semi elliptical springs all round and cost from £595. Two different chassis lengths were available, 9 feet 4 inches (2.84 m) SC and 10 feet (3.0 m) LC to cater for the customer's choice of bodywork. As demand grew a lot of the construction work went to Lenaerts and Dolphens in Barnes, London but final assembly and test remained at Fairmile. The engine grew to 3 litres in 1926 and 4½ litres in late 1928.

=== NLC and A Type Chassis ===
The larger engine was used in the William Watson designed 1929 4½ litre NLC chassis available in short 9-foot-10-inch (3.00 m) or long 10-foot-6-inch (3.20 m) versions, but the less expensive A Type replaced the NLC in 1930.

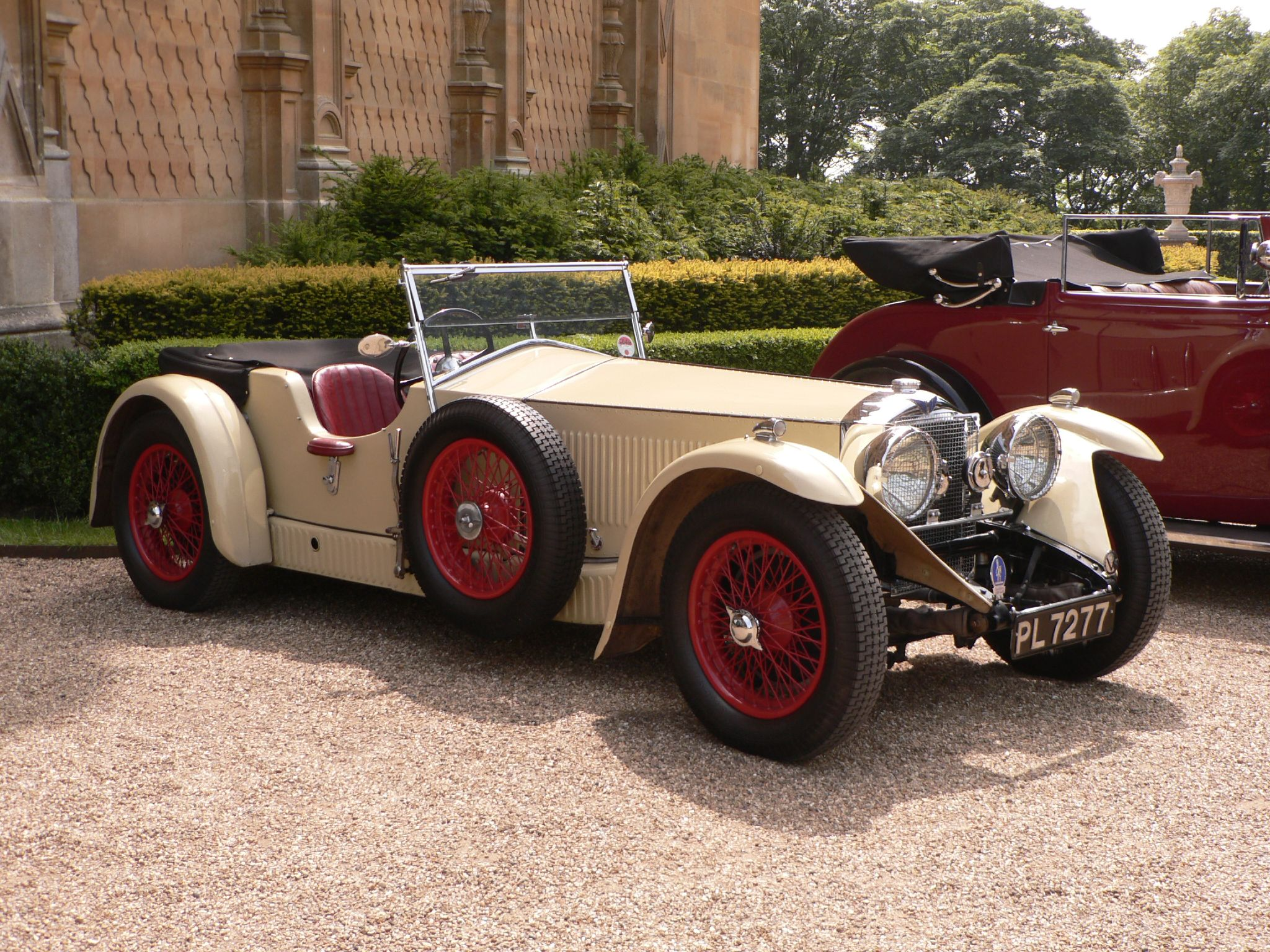
4½ litre S-type from 1931

=== S-type ===
In 1930 the S-type was launched at the London Motor Show. Still using the 4½ litre Meadows engine but in a low chassis slung under the rear axle. About 75 were made.

=== 1½ litre ===
In an attempt to widen the market appeal the 1½ litre straight-six overhead-cam Blackburne engined 12/45 L-type was announced in 1932. It was a large car with its 9-foot-10-inch (3.00 m) wheelbase and proved too heavy for the available power needing a 6:1 rear axle ratio. It was available with a preselector gearbox as an option and most had coachwork by Carbodies. The supercharged 12/90 of 1933 increased the available power from 45 to 90 bhp (67 kW) but few were made and a proposed twin-cam 12/100 never got beyond a prototype.

=== Success ===
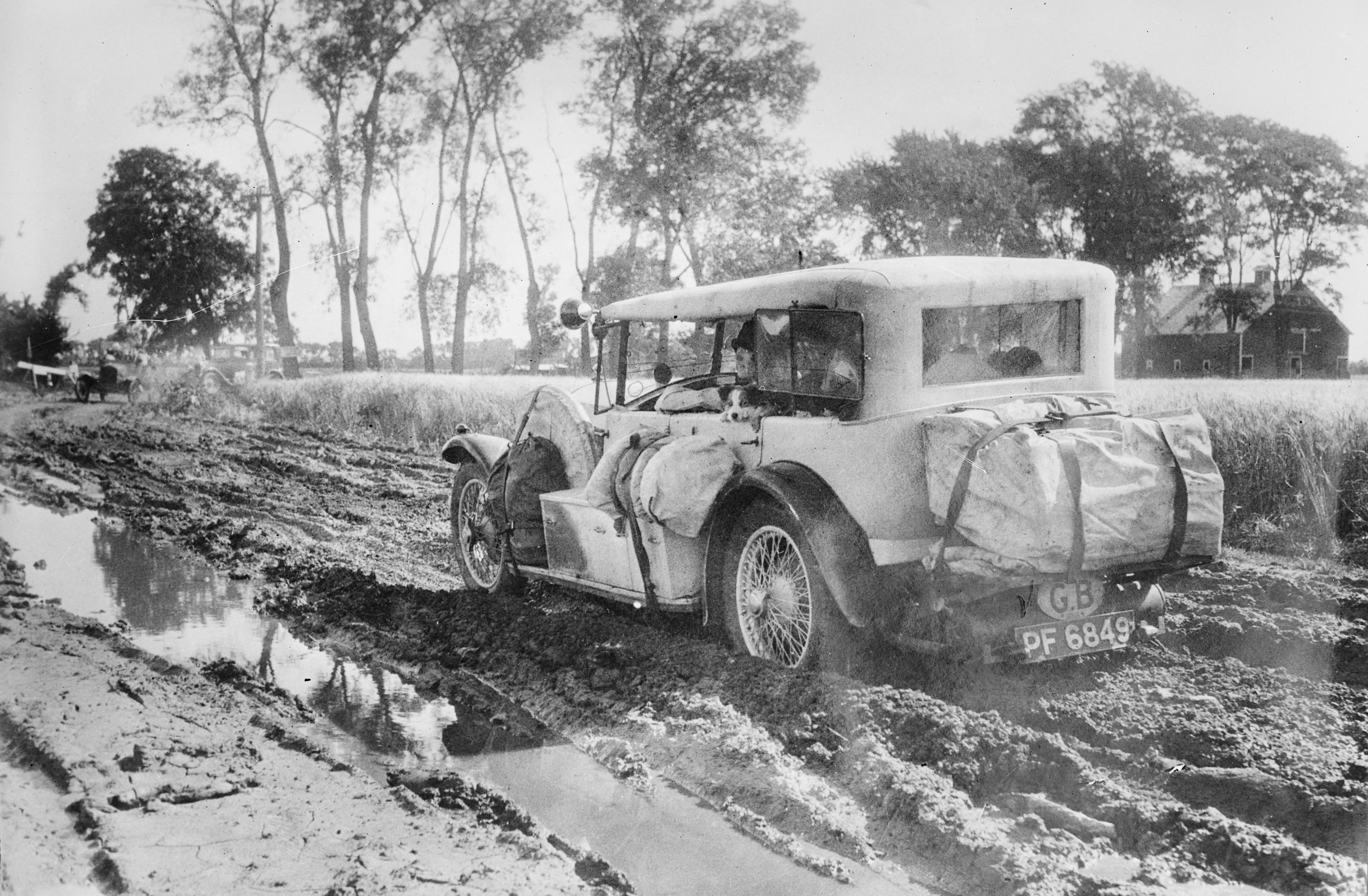
Violete Cordery, July 1927

Sporting success for Invicta often came via Violette Cordery, who was Noel Macklin's sister-in-law. She won the half mile sprint at the West Kent Motor Club meeting at Brooklands in 1925 driving a 2.7 litre. In March 1926 Cordery was part of a team of six drivers that set multiple long distance records at the Autodromo Nazionale Monza in Italy. They covered 10,000 miles at 56.47 mph, and 15,000 miles at 55.76 mph. In July 1926 at the Autodrome de Linas-Montlhéry track, Paris, they covered 5000 miles at 70.7 mph, taking over 70 hours of day and night driving, supervised by the Royal Automobile Club.

Cordery was twice awarded the Dewar Trophy, latterly in 1929 for driving 30,000 miles (48,000 km) in 30,000 minutes (20.8 days) at Brooklands, averaging 61.57 mph. Between February and July 1927 Cordery drove an Invicta around the world, accompanied by a nurse, a mechanic, and an RAC observer. They covered 10,266 miles in five months at 24.6 mph, crossing Europe, Africa, India, Australia, the United States and Canada.

In 1930 Donald Healey gained a class win in the Monte Carlo Rally, and won the event outright in 1931 with an S Type, having started from Stavanger. A S. C. H. "Sammy" Davis had a spectacular accident in an S-type at Brooklands in 1931. Raymond Mays held the Brooklands Mountain Circuit Class Record in 1931 and 1932, and the outright Shelsley Walsh Sports Car Record in the latter year.

=== End of production ===
Car production seems to have finished in 1935. Noel Macklin went on to found Railton, who used the Cobham buildings to make their cars after Invicta moved to Chelsea in 1933. An attempted revival using Delage and Darracq components failed to get off the ground. Following the collapse of an attempted sale the court made an order for the compulsory winding up of Invicta Cars Limited on 3 May 1938.

== 1946 revival ==
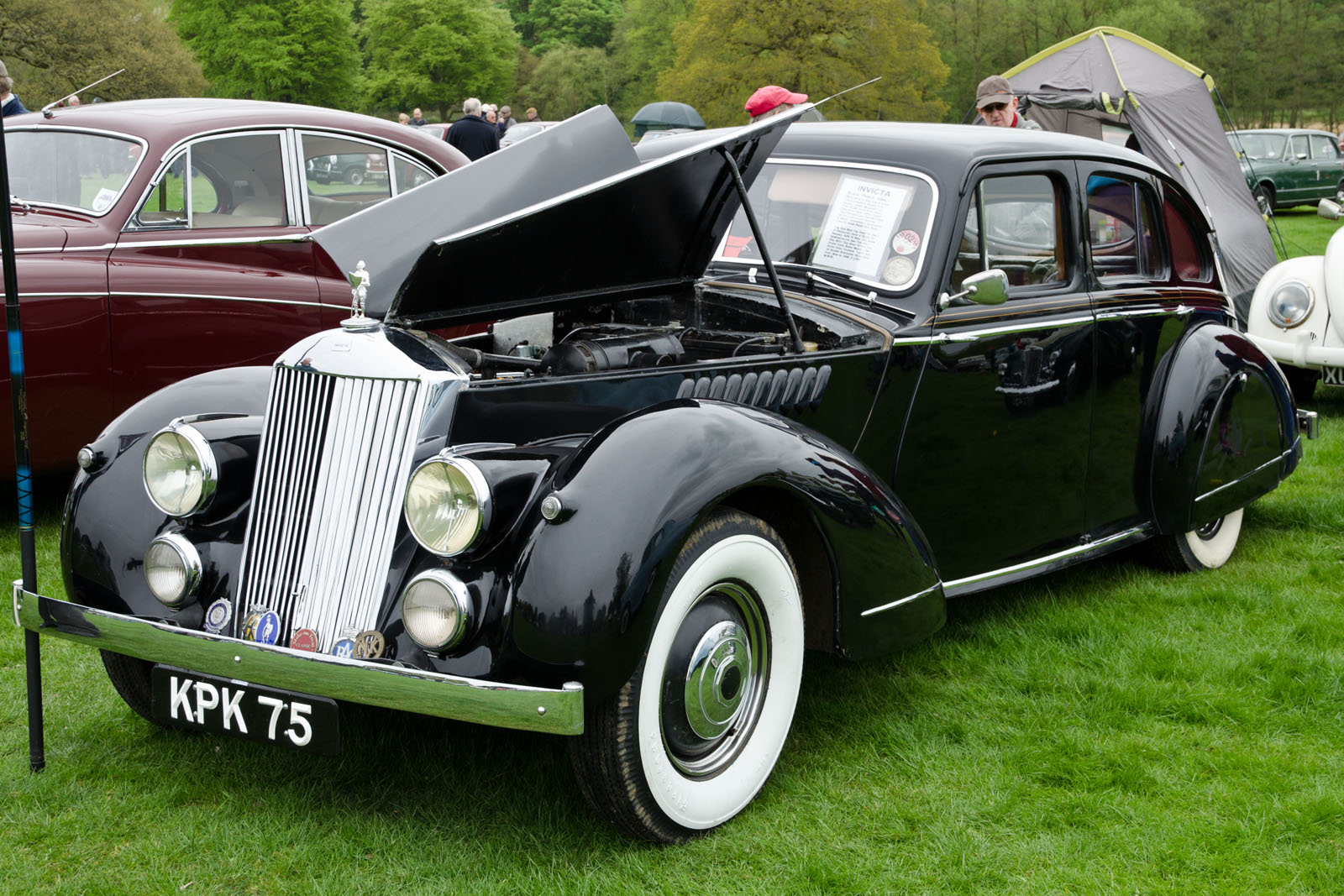
Black Prince, 1946

The name was revived in 1946 by an organisation calling themselves Invicta Cars of Virginia Water Surrey who began making the Black Prince. Meadows engines were again used, this time a twin overhead camshaft 3-litre six with three carburettors giving 120 bhp. The aluminium-bodied cars – steel supplies were effectively non-existent for new businesses in Britain's new centrally planned economy – were extremely complex and very expensive with a torque converter (Brockhouse Hydro-Kinetic Turbo Transmitter) entirely replacing the gearbox. The torque converter was controlled by a small switch with forward and reverse positions. Suspension was fully independent using torsion bars and there were built-in electric jacks. Other innovative luxury items included a trickle-charger to charge the battery from the domestic mains, an immersion heater in the engine, interior heating of the body and a built-in radio. About 16 were made, 12 of which have survived. The new company lasted until 1950, when it was bought by Frazer Nash makers, AFN Ltd.

== 1989–date ==
Invicta Cars Ltd. Company No. 02342199 was registered again in 1989 by Christopher Browning, an Invicta enthusiast who was involved in the restoration and running of Invicta cars designed between 1925 and 1935. The purpose of the company was – and still is today – to record and preserve the heritage of the company name and provide a reference point for all the Invicta cars that are either being restored or are running on the road today.

== 2004–12 ==
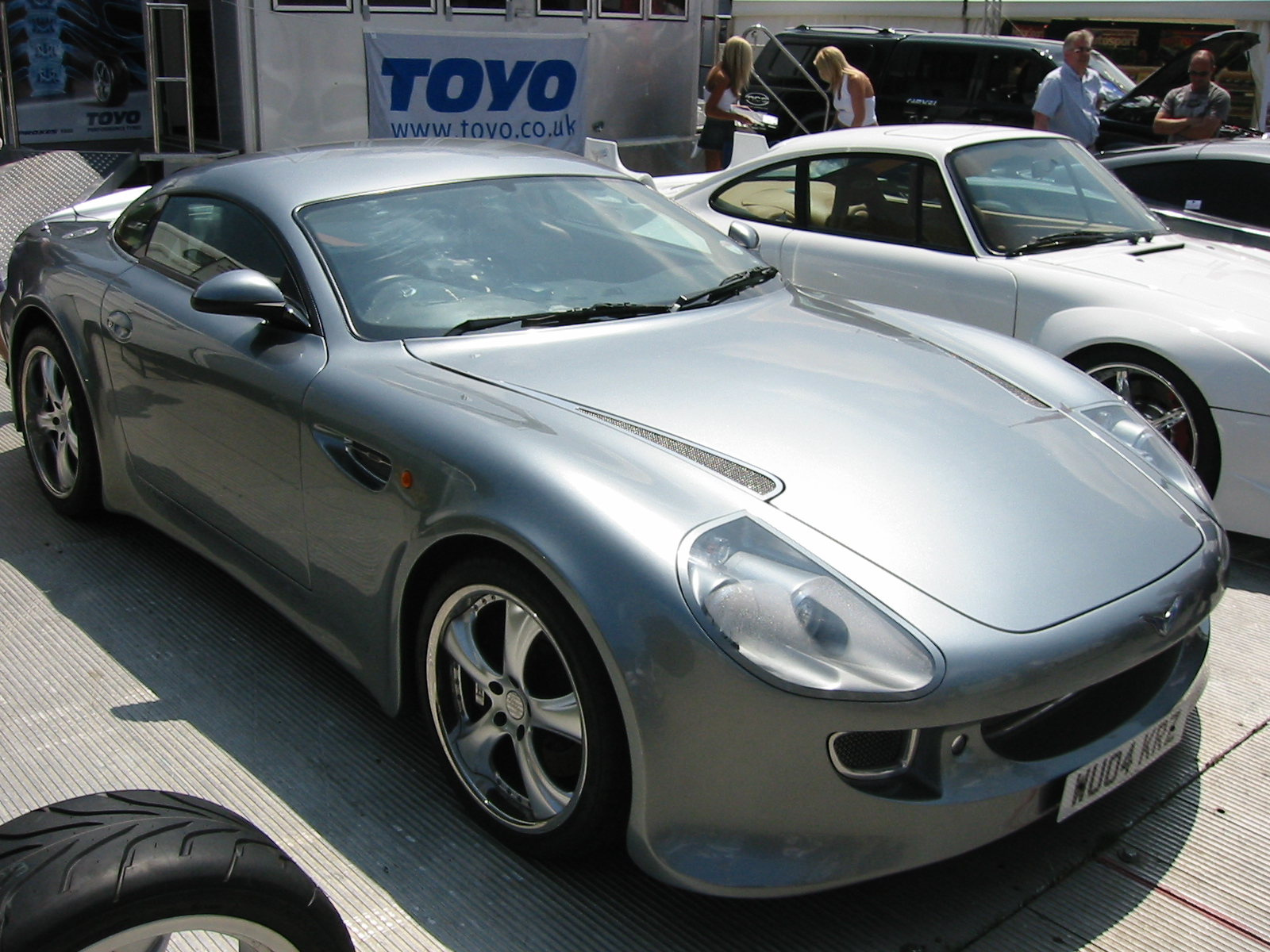
Invicta S1

In the early 2000s, the marque was resurrected yet again, producing the Invicta S1, at the Invicta Car Company factory in Chippenham, Wiltshire, England owned by Michael Bristow who acquired the brand in 1980.

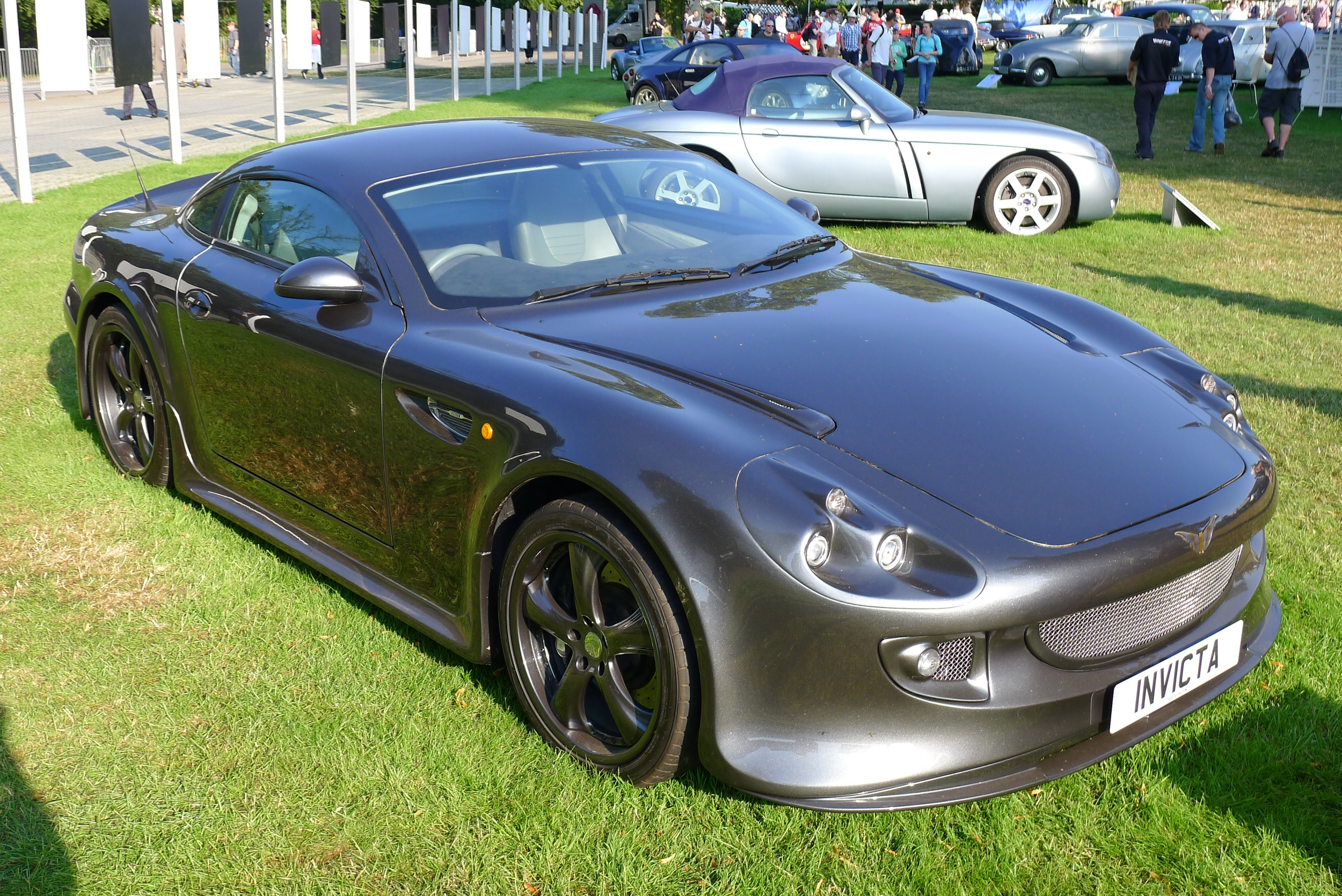
Invicta S1

The S1 was launched at the 2002 British International Motor Show. The car, designed in cooperation with Chris Marsh & Leigh Adams, was powered by a 4.6 L; 280.8 cu in (4,601 cc) Ford Modular V8, producing 320 bhp (239 kW; 324 PS), with a claimed top speed of 180 mph (290 km/h) and acceleration to 60 mph in 5 seconds.

A revised version was launched in 2008, called the Invicta S1 600, powered by a supercharged 5.0-litre V8 engine. The engine was supplied by Ford's Special Vehicle Team (SVT) in America, and was tuned by Invicta to deliver up to 600 bhp (608 PS; 447 kW) at 6000 rpm and 780 N⋅m (575 lbf⋅ft) of torque at 4500 rpm, giving the car a claimed top speed of upwards of 200 mph (322 km/h). The range prices started at £106,000 and finished at £160,000, or about $156,000 to $236,000 US dollars (December 2008).

The car features AP Racing 6-pot (front) and 4-pot (rear) main braking system with cross drilled and race spec ventilated disc brakes, an independent hand brake system by Brembo, fully adjustable shock absorbers with race double wishbone suspension, a BTR Hydratrak race limited-slip differential, 50/50 weight distribution and a space frame tubular chassis and roll cage.

In April 2012, Westpoint Car Company, formerly the Invicta Car Company, was wound-up by the court as a result of a £40,000 unpaid debt following diminishing interest in expensive cars. Invicta Motors changed its name to Westpoint Car Company shortly before it was dissolved to save the Invicta brand being linked to yet another financial failure. The dispossessed owner, Michael Bristow, said it was the fourth financial collapse in the marque's history.

== Main models ==
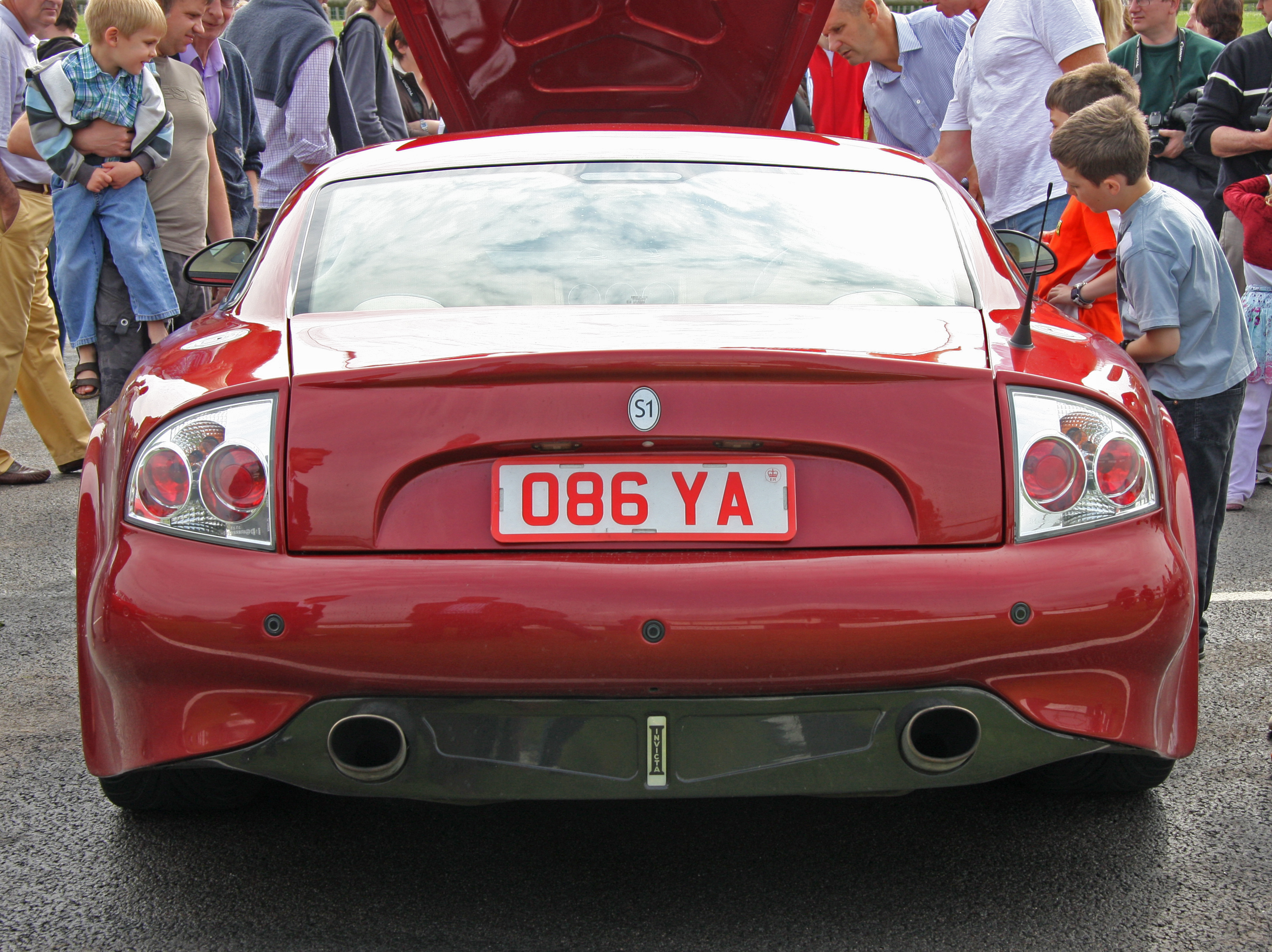
Invicta S1 rear

- 1925–26 2½ litre
- 1926–29 3 litre
- 1928–34 4½ litre
- 1931–35 4½ litre S-Type
- 1932–33 12/45
- 1932–33 12/90
- 1937–38 2½ litre
- 1946–50 Black Prince
- 2004–12 S1

== Other Invicta brands ==
There were earlier but unconnected Invicta companies which made cars in Finchley, London from 1900 to 1905 and Leamington, Warwickshire, England, from 1913 to 1914. There was also an Invicta in Turin, Italy, in 1906.

Buick Invicta was a General Motors product made from 1959 to 1963.

== See also ==
- List of car manufacturers of the United Kingdom
