= Violette Cordery =

British racing driver

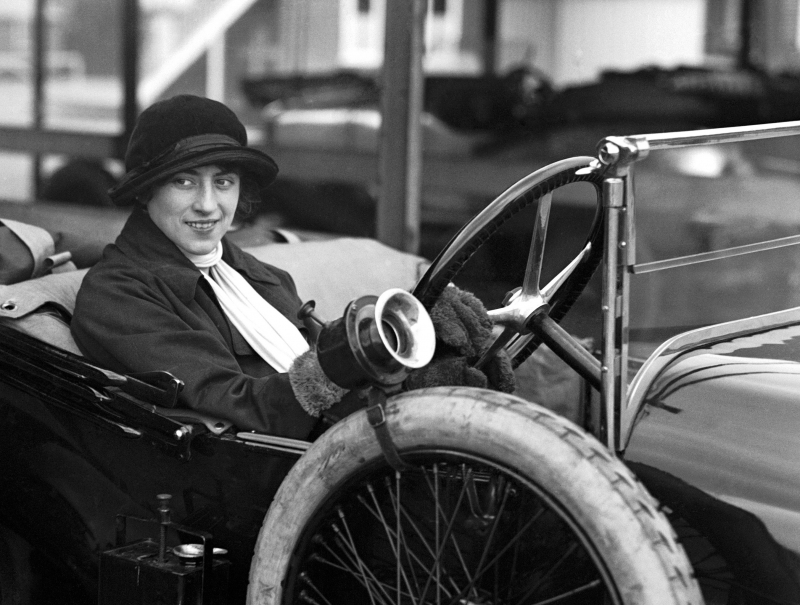
- Cordery at the wheel of the "Eric-Campbell" 10 h.p. in 1919
- Born: 10 January 1900; London, England
- Died: 30 December 1983 (aged 83); Oxshott, England
- Occupation: Racing driver
- Spouse: John Stuart Hindmarsh (1931-1938; his death)
- Children: 2
- Relatives: Noel Macklin (brother-in-law); George Duller (brother-in-law)

Violette Cordery (married name Hindmarsh; 10 January 1900 – 30 December 1983) was a British racing driver and long distance record breaker.

== Early life ==
Cordery was born in London to Henry Cordery and had an elder sister (Lucy)/Leslie and a younger sister Evelyn who also participated in her driving exploits.

== Motoring ==
Cordery was employed as a driver to captain Noel Macklin of the Royal Naval Volunteer Reserve (RNVR) at Dover. He subsequently invalided out of the Royal Artillery in 1915 and transferred to the RNVR. Macklin was married to her elder sister Lucy.

In 1920 she competed in the South Harting hill climb driving a Silver Hawk, manufactured by Noel Macklin. Cordery also competed in two British Motor Cycle Racing Club handicap events driving an Eric-Campbell, also manufactured by Noel Macklin. In May 1921 she won the ladies' race at the Junior Car Club meeting, averaging 49.7 miles per hour (80.0 km/h).

In 1925 she publicised the new Invicta car, also manufactured by Noel Macklin, by racing and breaking records. At the West Kent Motor Club meeting at Brooklands she won the half mile sprint in a 2.7 litre Invicta, and went on other victories and records.

In 1926 she set a long distance record at the Autodromo Nazionale Monza, Italy, when she co-drove a 19.6 hp Invicta for 10,000 miles (16,000 km) at 56.47 miles per hour (90.88 km/h). In July 1926 she averaged 70.7 miles per hour (113.8 km/h) for 5,000 miles (8,000 km) at Autodrome de Linas-Montlhéry, Paris, and became the first woman to be awarded the Dewar Trophy by the Royal Automobile Club.

In 1927 she drove an Invicta around the world in five months, covering 10,266 miles (16,522 km) at an average speed of 24.6 miles per hour (39.6 km/h). She traveled through Europe, Africa, India, Australia, the United States, and Canada accompanied by a nurse, a mechanic, and a Royal Automobile Club observer.

In 1929, with her younger sister Evelyn, she covered 30,000 miles (48,000 km) of the Brooklands circuit within 30,000 minutes (approximately 20 days, 20 hours) at an average speed 61.57 miles per hour (99.09 km/h) and earning a second Dewar Trophy from the Royal Automobile Club. By 1930 her 4.5-litre Invicta tourer had completed return journeys from London to Monte Carlo, London to John O'Groats and London to Edinburgh.

Cordery was a member of the London Ladies' Motor Club a motorcycle club for women based in London, founded in 1926/7 by racer and stunt rider Jessie Hole (later Jessie Ennis). The club president was Kathleen Pelham Burn (Countess of Drogheda), Betty Debenham was press secretary and other members included Nancy Debenham, Marjorie Cottle and Mrs Victor Bruce.

== Family life ==
Cordery married the racing driver and aviator John Stuart Hindmarsh on 15 September 1931 at Stoke D'Abernon parish church. They had two daughters, of whom Susan married the racing driver Roy Salvadori. Widowed in 1938 by Hindmarsh's death while test flying a Hawker Hurricane, she retired from public life until her death on 30 December 1983 in Oxshott, Surrey. She was cremated at Randalls Park crematorium.
