= Chalmer & Hoyer =

British coach-building company

- Company type: Private company
- Industry: Automobile
- Founded: 1921 in Hamworthy near Poole
- Founders: Ernest Chalmer, Hamilton Hoyer, and Henry William Allingham
- Defunct: 1932
- Fate: Voluntary liquidation
- Headquarters: London, United Kingdom
- Area served: United Kingdom
- Products: Automotive bodies and coachwork

Chalmer & Hoyer was a British coach-building company with premises in Poole, Dorset and Weybridge, Surrey. In 1926 the company name changed to the Hoyal Body Corporation Ltd. The company operated from 1921 until its closure in 1932.

== History ==
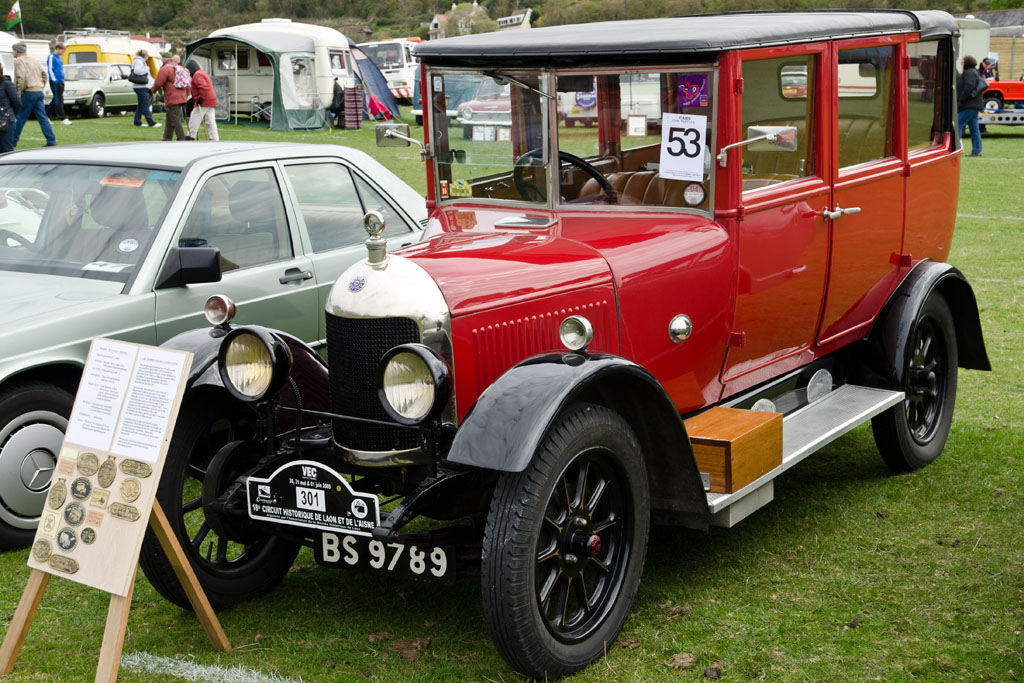
1926 Morris Oxford with Chalmer & Hoyer coachwork

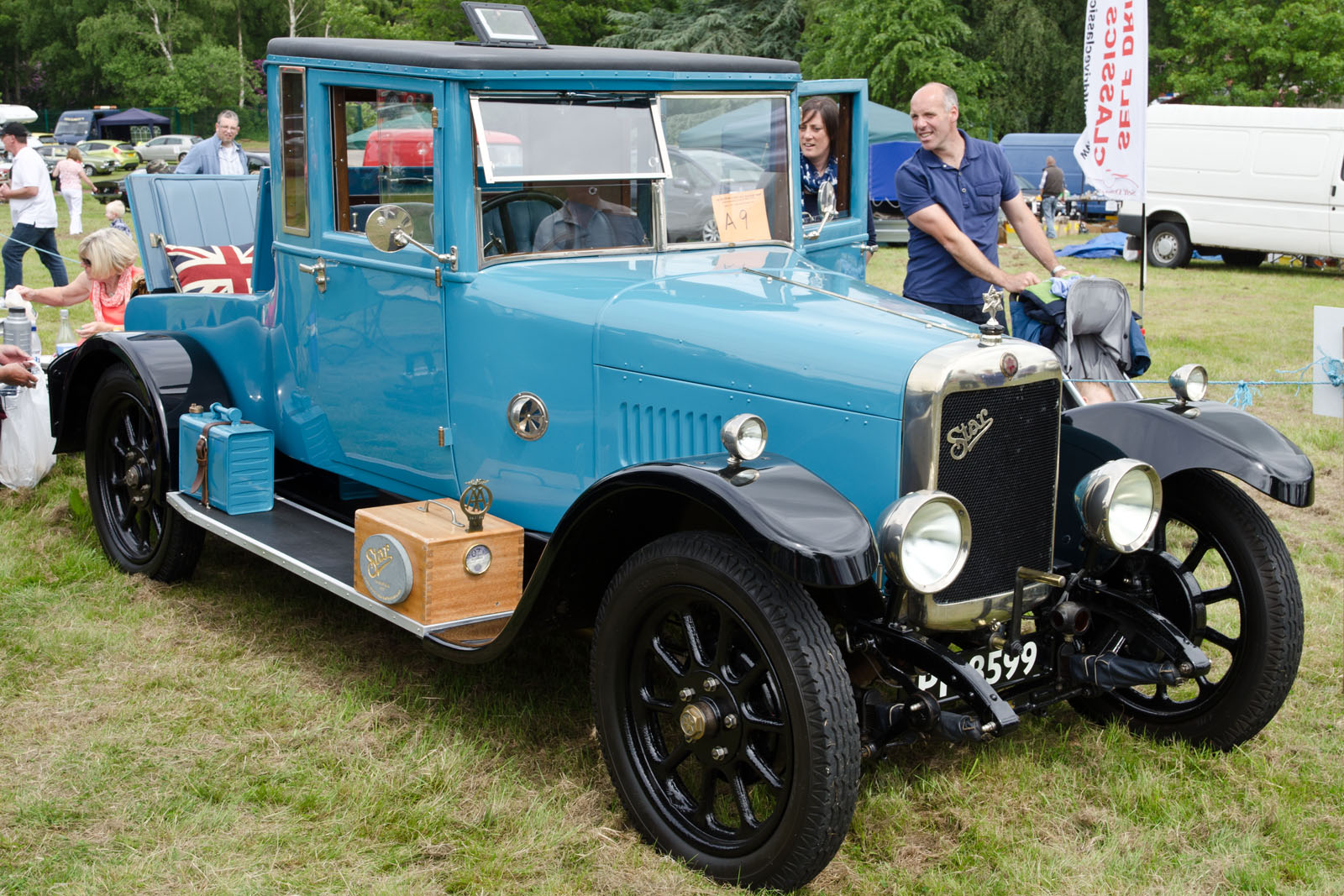
1927 Star with Hoyal coachwork

The company was founded in 1921 by Yorkshire-born Ernest Chalmer (formerly Jens Ernst Schmidt), Danish born Henry Hamilton Hoyer (formerly Henrik Therigaard Højer) and Surrey-born Henry William Allingham (a different man from WW1 veteran Henry Allingham, who lived to be the world's oldest man). They took over a former aircraft factory in Hamworthy near Poole, to build private and light commercial vehicle bodies and motor boats and set up a head office at 41 Charing Cross Road, London. The company policy, largely derived from Allingham's earlier experience in working in industry in the USA was not to seek individual customers but to deal with volume sales to motor manufacturers. It would achieve this either by providing the maker with bodies or providing extra coachwork designs under its own name.

In 1924 Chalmer and Hoyer took over the empty works of Lang Propellers in Weybridge. A major contract had been agreed with Morris to provide closed bodies for the Oxford model and by 1925 this accounted for almost the entire output of Weybridge.

The company took a stand at the London Motor Show from 1922 until 1930. In 1923 they showed a Bentley with Weymann coachwork, being the first British coachbuilder to take out a licence. They were also one of the first British coachbuilders to install a plant for spraying cellulose paint.

In 1926 Morris opened its Pressed Steel factory and moved over to steel bodied cars, subsequently giving the Weybridge works much less work to do beyond a limited number bodies for Chrysler, Daimler and other higher priced makes. In the same year the company was renamed as the Hoyal Body Corporation, taking a brand name they had been using for some time, composed of the first letters of Hoyer and Allingham.

In 1926, Chalmer & Hoyer was renamed the Hoyal Body Corporation Ltd after Chalmer left the company. Hoyer and Allingham became joint managing directors.

After losing the Morris contract Hoyal concentrated on their established bus and coach bodies mostly on Daimler Company, Tilling-Stevens and Dennis Brothers chassis and luxury car coachwork for more expensive makes at Weybridge, and on boat building at Poole. Orders for individual body designs were now also welcomed but the company was losing money and in August 1931 a receiver was appointed, Hoyal went into voluntary liquidation and was closed down in 1932.

== Aftermath ==
Two of Hoyal's employees, John Dalrymple and Charles Livesay purchased some of the equipment and tooling and set up as John Charles & Co near Kew Gardens, London.

Henry Allingham went on to form his own company, Vehicle Developments Ltd. Here, until the late 1930s he sourced special bodies from other coachbuilders for car makers such as Rover, MG and Vauxhall. He also designed standard pressed steel body parts for drop head coupes, which he marketed under the Sandringham brand. The steel components for these bodies were designed in cooperation with Ambi-Budd in Germany.
