= National Benzole =

British petroleum brand

National Benzole Company Ltd
- Type: Subsidiary
- Industry: Oil
- Founded: 1919
- Defunct: 1990s
- Fate: Subsumed by BP
- Headquarters: London, England
- Products: Petrol
- Parent: BP

National Benzole was a petroleum brand used in the United Kingdom from 1919 to the 1990s. In 1957, the National Benzole Co. became wholly owned by Shell-Mex & BP (through British Petroleum) but continued its separate trading identity. In the early 1960s, National Benzole was re-branded as National and continued trading as a UK retailer of petroleum products until the early 1990s, when the brand was phased out by parent company, BP.

== Foundation ==
National Benzole was founded in February 1919 in a room next to the boiler house of the Gas Light and Coke Company in London's Horseferry Road. In the early years of the century, benzole production had been small scale. However, because it was as good at propelling shells as motor cars, production was expanded massively during World War I. This generally led to a post-war "benzole-lake".

A group of men, including Samuel Henshaw, then the chairman of the Staffordshire Chemical Company, reckoned there was money to be made from these surplus-to-requirements stocks. Henshaw became the first chairman of the National Benzole Company. Although the idea of using benzole to power automobiles was not new, cars fueled on neat benzole needed altered carburetor settings which was inconvenient for owners who had previously used petrol and the effectiveness of neat benzole as a paint stripper raised concern about the possible effect on carburettor floats made of varnished cork – a common feature in US vehicles which at the time were being imported in greater numbers. There was also concern about the variable quality and specification of the benzole. It was in the need to address these concerns, especially regarding consistency of fuel quality, that Henshaw and his colleagues recognized their commercial opportunity.

A distribution network was established consisting of a few (initially) storage depots round the country, supplied by a small fleet of used lorries with solid tyres, acquired from the War Disposals Board. These transported the fuel in war-surplus drums and cans of 2, 4 or 50 gallons.

== The 1920s: Rapid growth ==
The young company received a boost in 1920 with the award of the RAC Dewar Trophy to a Rolls-Royce 40/50 hp that successfully completed a 10,000-mile reliability trial fuelled exclusively by National Benzole. Problems arose in the same year from a coal strike which restricted benzole availability, and increased demand in the ensuing years led to frequent shortages of coal shale from which the benzole was made. At the same time, some reckoned neat benzole was a little strong for the average engine and started to mix it with petrol. This led in 1922 to the replacement of benzole fuel with a "fifty-fifty mixture" of benzole and petroleum which addressed the supply issue and could be seen as an early example of customer responsiveness. Neat benzole continued to be marketed as an effective anti-knocking performance enhancing additive.

Military service in World War I introduced many British men to motoring for the first time: returning survivors began, where funds permitted, to purchase small motor cars or motor bikes, while others set up in business to maintain and repair the motor cars of the wealthy. Before the war, motor fuel suppliers in the UK had typically included pharmacies, cycle shops or even blacksmiths, but after the war, commercial roadside garages began to appear albeit slowly at first. Because garages were initially sparse, the Automobile Association (AA) itself set up twelve strategically located filling stations, supplying fuel only to its own members and making no profit from the transactions. Initially, the AA fuel stations supplied only National Benzole which was seen a particularly patriotic fuel choice because the coal shale which was the principal ingredient of benzole was domestically produced. In 1927, the AA dismantled its small chain of service stations as the growth of a commercially motivated service station network rendered them unnecessary, but by this time National Benzole was a nationally established fuel brand in the UK.

During this period the company consciously "smartened up" its public face. Initially the enthusiastic driver/ salesmen delivery drivers had also been the company's sales force, touting relentlessly for new business as they made deliveries to existing customers. Ten years later the head office had relocated to an upmarket location in London's Grosvenor Gardens and a sales force was recruited, equipped with Morris Cowleys painted yellow, which had become the company's colour.

== Mr Mercury ==
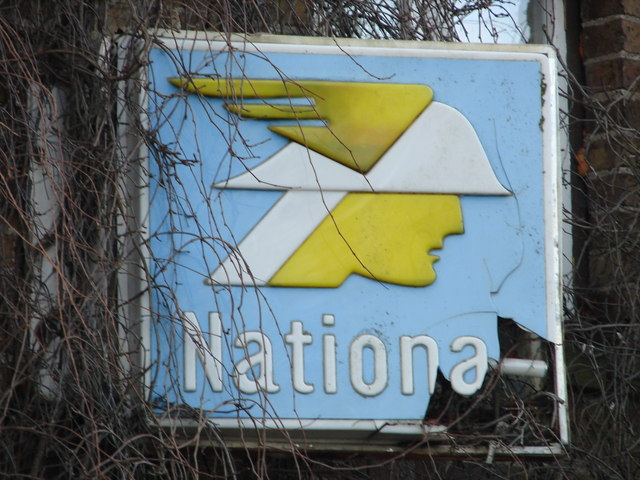
Mr Mercury sign of a former National petrol station at Friskney, Lincolnshire

Mr. Mercury, in National Benzole's black and chrome gold corporate colours, became one of the most powerful marketing images of this age. Almost every service station in the 1930s had a National Benzole pump, for single-brand sites were unknown in those days. Eventually, Mr. Mercury's head was used as the brand's logo. At the outbreak of the Second World War, all petrol brands gave way to pool petrol.

Mr. Mercury returned in 1953, now more modestly attired in the advertisements, though he retained his winged helmet, and National Benzole quickly re-established itself as a market leader.

== The 1930s: Competitor issues ==
Switching from neat benzole to the fifty-fifty mixture was not a complete solution to the supply issue. It reduced but did not eliminate the company's dependence on the UK coal mining cartel, while it introduced an inherent tension in the relationship with the petroleum suppliers who were also major competitors for road fuel sales. The petroleum supply issue was to some extent addressed by "buying on the high seas" whereby the company, having no oil refining capacity of its own, contracted to buy from shippers full tanker loads of refined fuel.

As motoring passed from being a recreation for the leisure hours of a leisured class to a mainstream means of transport, the National Benzole business continued its growth path. A partial solution to the supply concerns was a long term petroleum contract with the Anglo-Persian Oil Company which foreshadowed still closer links with the future British Petroleum company: in the meantime National Benzole acquired oceangoing tankers of its own.

== Benzole phase out ==
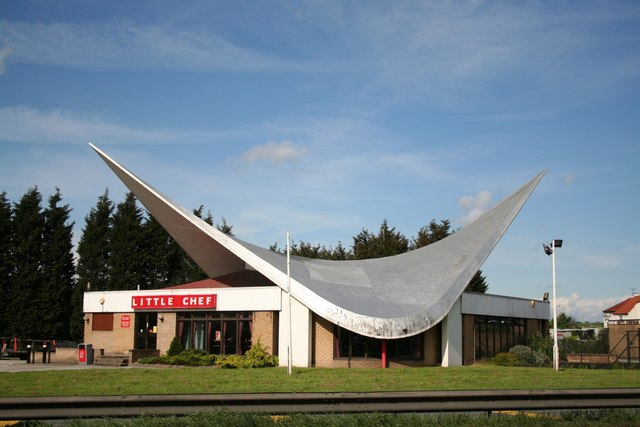
National Benzole's former Markham Moor Scorer Building (1960) as a Little Chef in 2006. The petrol station, at Markham Moor services on the A1, was designed by Sam Scorer and is a Grade II listed building

Effectively promoted and distributed into the second half of the twentieth century, National Benzole continued to be popular with British motorists and the National Benzole brand remained a common sight at the roadside. However the proportion of benzole in the mixture was reduced progressively after World War II as the number of more lucrative specialist applications for the chemical grew with the development of the UK's chemical industry. During the late 1950s Benzole was determined to be hazardous to health: its anti-knocking properties as a fuel ingredient were no longer so important for the smooth running of engines, since various additives including, ironically, tetraethyllead were now routinely included in refined petroleum. Therefore, from the early 1960s onwards National sold only petrol.

== Shell-Mex and BP ==
National Benzole joined the Shell-Mex & BP family in 1957 but continued to trade separately.

In 1959, responding to the growing importance of benzole as a specialist chemical, it was decided to concentrate on this market by means of a new company named Benzole Producers Limited. At the same time the motor fuel marketing business was now fully merged with Shell-Mex & BP. Benzole (no longer part of the mixture) was dropped from the fuel's name and Mr. Mercury's black and chrome gave way to sparkling new yellow, blue and white. Following the de-merger of Shell-Mex & BP in 1976, the National brand continued to be distinctively marketed by BP for over a decade.

== Decline ==
In the 1970s and 1980s, the company's petrol stations sold figurines of The Smurfs comic characters whose blue and white colouring matched the National colours. However, during the 1980s, the National brand declined as BP focused on the strength of the BP brand.

By the early 1990s, the brand name was phased out in favour of BP. There was a brief re-appearance of the National Brand from 2000 when Scottish Fuels branded its retail outlets as 'National'. These outlets have since been re-branded into the colours of Scottish Fuels. The last National-branded filling station on the Isle of Wight closed in recent years.
