= Lagonda Rapier =

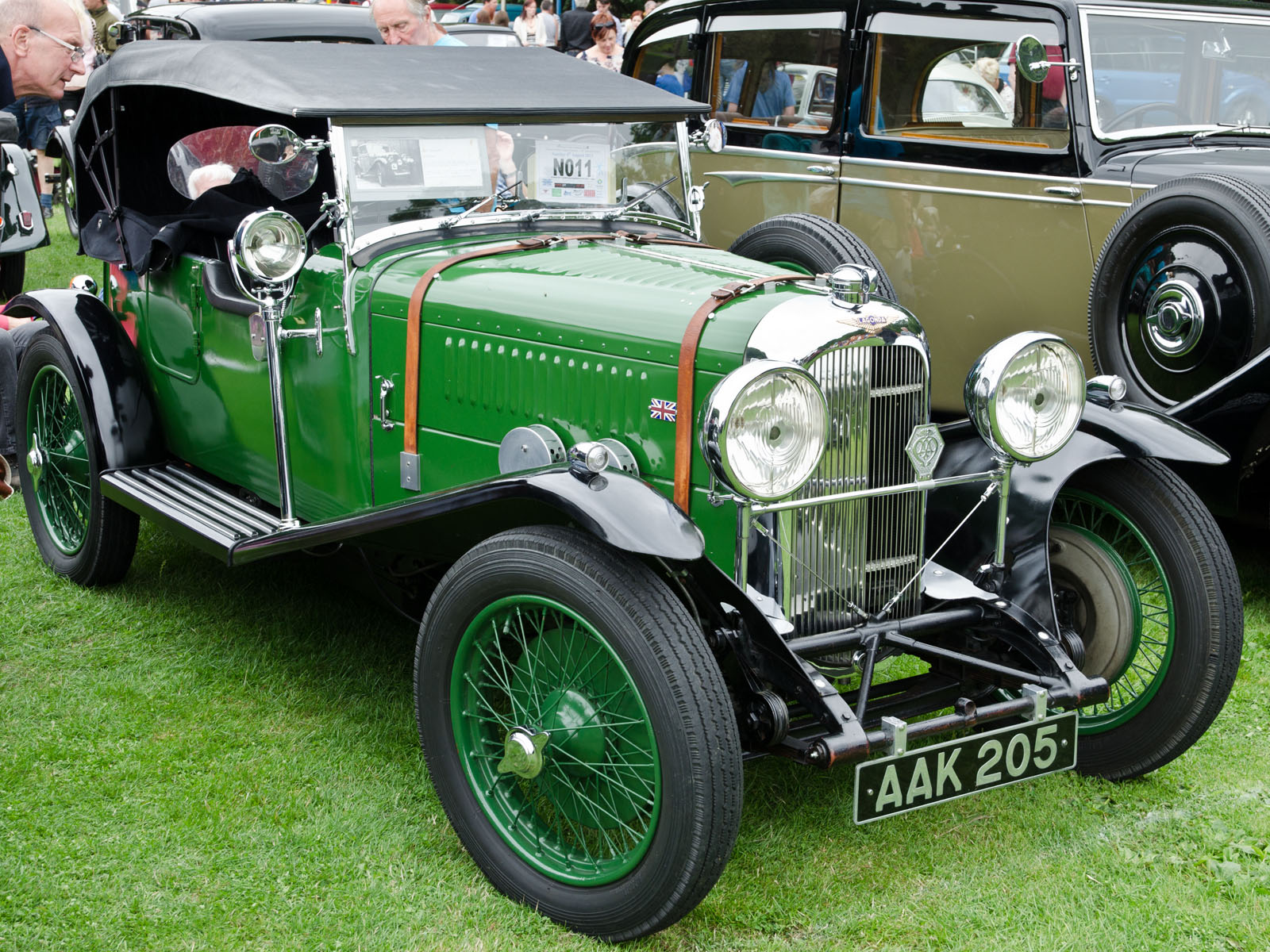
- Lagonda Rapier 4-seater tourer body, 1935

Overview
- Manufacturer: Lagonda
- Production: 1934–1938; 470 + 46 by Rapier Cars
- Designer: Tim Ashcroft and Charles King

Body and chassis
- Body style: 2-door sports tourer 2-door coupé

Powertrain
- Engine: 1.1 L Lagonda Straight-4 engine double overhead cam
- Transmission: 4-speed pre-selector

Dimensions
- Wheelbase: 98.75 in (2,508 mm)
- Length: 138 in (3,505 mm)
- Width: 57.5 in (1,460 mm)

The Lagonda Rapier was a small car produced by the British Lagonda company from 1934 to 1935. A few more were subsequently produced by the independent Rapier Car Company.

At the heart of the car was an all new 1104 cc twin overhead camshaft four-cylinder engine. The design of this was done by a consultant Thomas Ashcroft (known as Tim) with the brief of producing "Britain's finest 1100 cc engine". The engine was originally intended to be cast in light alloy but to save cost it was eventually made in cast iron using the original patterns making it rather heavy. It did, however, produce 50 bhp (37 kW; 51 PS) at 5400 rpm, a very good output for the time. Production of the engine was sub-contracted to Coventry Climax.

The chassis was designed by Charles King and consisted of steel sections bolted together. The engine was connected to a four-speed preselector gearbox with right-hand change lever and the Girling system rod operated brakes had large 13 in (330 mm) drums. Half-elliptic springs provided the suspension controlled by friction dampers.

Although the original car as shown at the 1933 London Motor Show had a wheelbase of 90.75 in (2,305 mm), in order to cater for a wider range of bodies, production cars from 1934 had this extended by 8 in (203 mm) to 98.75 in (2,508 mm). The factory supplied the running chassis for £270 to customers who could then select their own coachwork. Most cars had bodies by E. D. Abbott Ltd of Farnham, Surrey. A complete car with Abbott four-seat tourer body sold for £368. Other suppliers of coachwork included John Charles, Maltby and E J Newns who made around 12, subsequently known as Eagles.

The engine was just too large for use in the popular 1100 cc class so a few cars were made with 1084 cc engines.

In 1935 the Lagonda company failed and was bought by Alan Good who reformed it as LG Motors (Staines) Ltd. As part of the general upheaval the rights to make the Rapier were sold to a new company Rapier Cars Ltd of Hammersmith Road, London, a premises previously used by Lagonda as their London service centre. The intention was now to sell the car complete with body and a design was produced by Ranalah. A four-seat tourer was priced at £375. Production continued until 1938 but only 46 cars were made.

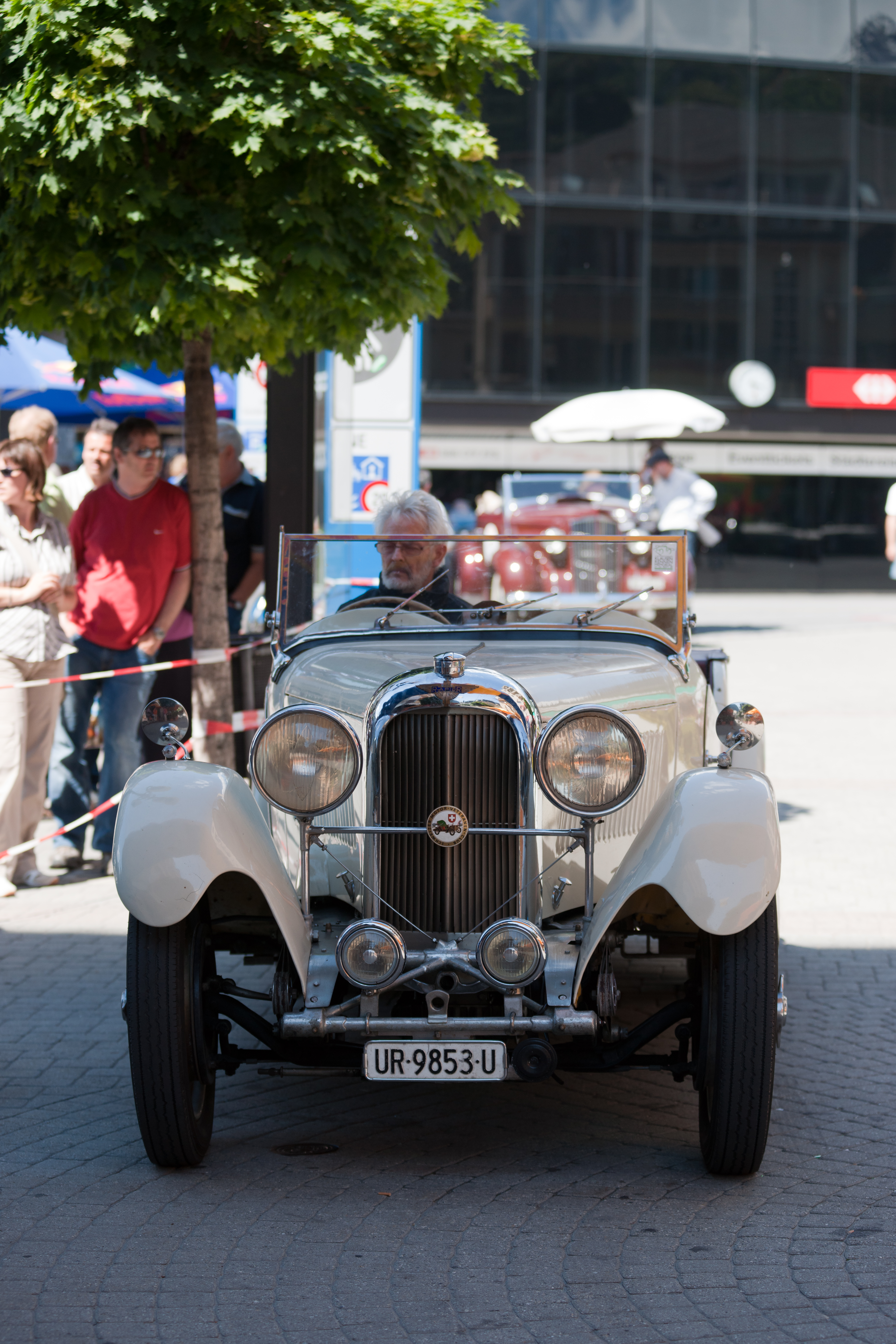
Rapier four-seater tourer in Switzerland (post-Lagonda)

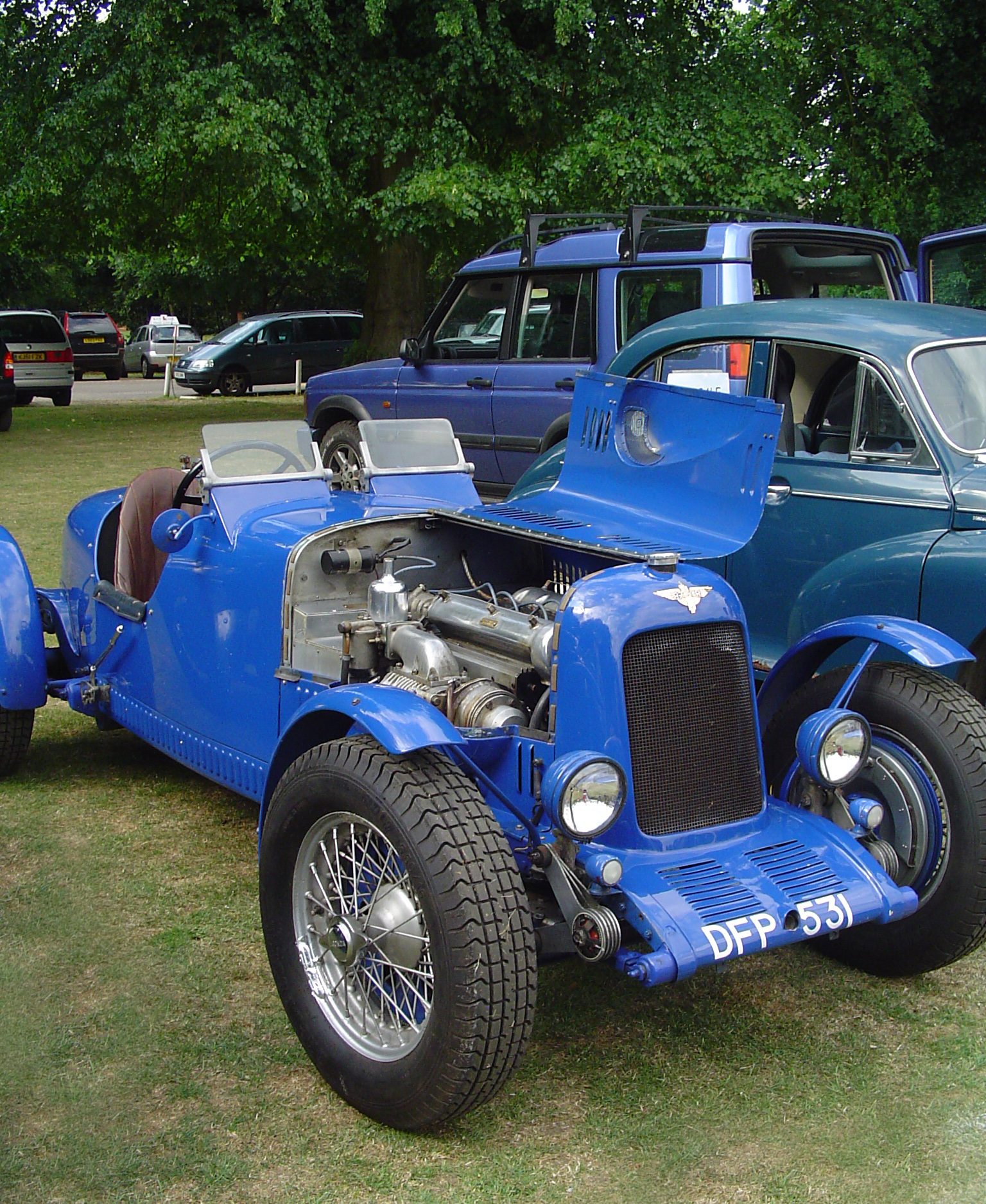
Rapier with custom bodywork

== See also ==
- List of car manufacturers of the United Kingdom
