= Scottish Fuels =

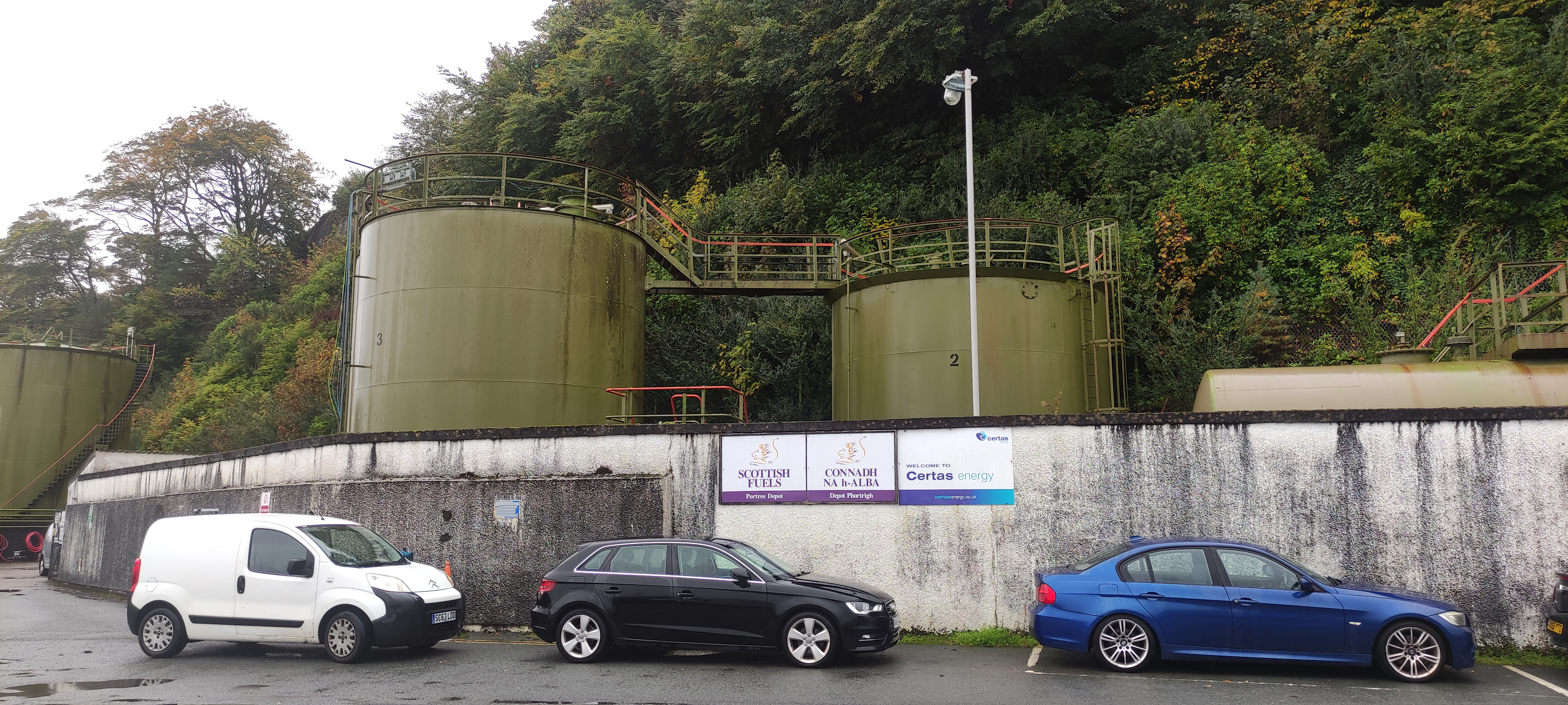
Scottish Fuels, Portree harbour Depot

Scottish Fuels is a distributor of fuel oil products and petrol within Scotland. It was formed in 2001 following the transfer of local assets from BP. Scottish Fuels is based in Falkirk and is owned by DCC plc, an Irish company.
