= Noel Macklin =

British car maker

Sir Albert Noel Campbell Macklin
- Born: 28 October 1886
- Died: 1946 (aged 59–60)
- Known for: the innovative design and manufacture of motor cars and naval boats

Sir (Albert) Noel Campbell Macklin (28 October 1886 – 1946) was an innovative British car maker and boat designer. He founded Eric-Campbell in 1919, Silver Hawk in 1920, Invicta in 1925, and Railton in 1933. In 1939 he founded Fairmile Marine and supplied boats to the Royal Navy throughout World War II, an effort for which he was honoured with a knighthood.

He was the father of sports car and Formula One racing driver Lance Macklin.

== Early life and education ==
Macklin was born in Western Australia, the eldest son of Charles Campbell Macklin (1866–1918), a barrister, and his wife, Ada Louisa, née Lockyer (1863/4–1935). By 1891, the family had moved to Wimbledon, London, and Macklin was educated at Eton College. He was a successful amateur jockey; from 1908 to 1910, he represented England and the Princes Ice Hockey Club in ice hockey, and in 1909, he raced a Mercedes at Brooklands.

In February 1914, he led an expedition to film big game in the Sudan.

== Career ==
=== World War 1 ===
Macklin was commissioned into the Royal Field Artillery in 1914 and served as a captain in the Royal Horse Artillery during the First World War. He was badly wounded in France and invalided out in 1915. Subsequently, he joined the Royal Naval Volunteer Reserve (RNVR) and served with the Dover Patrol. Upon his transfer to the RNVR, he enlisted Violette Cordery as his driver.

=== Car manufacture ===
Macklin co-founded the Eric-Campbell car manufacturer in 1919; the company's name was a portmanteau of the founders’ middle names, including "Campbell". By 1920, Macklin had shifted his focus to his new, short-lived Silver Hawk car marque. In 1925, he founded the Invicta car manufacturer—with financial backing from Oliver Lyle—which operated until circa 1935. However, by 1933, he was already concentrating on his new Railton marque.

=== Boat manufacture ===
After achieving some fame as a designer of sporty motor cars, Macklin turned his attention to motor boats. The Fairmile Engineering Company took its name from Macklin's country estate, Cobham Fairmile in Surrey, where he used the garage for manufacturing and assembly.

In 1939, inspired by an article on the Royal Navy’s need for small boats, he founded Fairmile Marine to design and manufacture small naval boats for the Admiralty. Since the company lacked the capital to meet the Admiralty's demands, it became a semi-independent department of the Admiralty, coordinating the supply of parts to boatyards across the country for vessel construction. For the loss of his company, Macklin was compensated with a large sum and a salary.

Fairmile boats provided the Royal Navy with motor boats, gunboats, and torpedo boats throughout the Second World War.

=== WW2 administration ===
As the war came to an end, Macklin was made Director for the disposal of the small boats in RN service.

== Family life ==
In March 1912, Macklin married Esmé Victoria (born 1887), daughter of Hinton Stewart of Strathgarry, Perthshire; however, they divorced in 1919. His second marriage was to (Lucy) Leslie Cordery (1896–1980), the sister of his RNVR driver, Violette Cordery. The Oxford Dictionary of National Biography notes that Lucy's name was variously recorded as Leslie Lane Cordery and Leslie Cordery Lane, daughter of Henry Lane, a farmer. The marriage produced two daughters and a son, Lance Macklin, the Formula 1 racing driver.

== Honours ==
After the war Macklin was knighted for his war effort, although the Admiralty did not return his Cobham site which they had requisitioned.

== See also ==
- Violette Cordery - sister-in-law.
