= Oliver Lyle =

British sugar technologist

Sir Oliver Lyle OBE
- Born: 1891; Weybridge, Surrey
- Died: 1961 (aged 69–70); London
- Spouse: Lilian Spicer
- Parent(s): John Lyle & Margaret Macgregor Yorke
- Engineering career
- Discipline: Energy engineering
- Employer: Tate & Lyle
- Projects: Steam Efficiency at Thames Refinery

Sir Oliver Lyle, OBE (1891–1961) was a British sugar technologist during the early 20th century.

== Early life ==
Lyle was born in Weybridge, Surrey in 1891 (the year his grandfather, Abram Lyle died), to John Lyle, a sugar refiner and ship owner. He grew up in Surrey.

== Military ==
During World War I, Lyle was an officer in the Highland Light Infantry.

== Work at Tate & Lyle ==
Lyle started work at what had been Abram Lyle's sugar factory at Plaistow when he was 21 and did various manual jobs such as boiling sugar in the refinery pans; in 1921 sugar refiners: Henry Tate & Sons and Abram Lyle & Sons merged to form Tate & Lyle. Later he and his older brother, Philip, became joint refinery directors. Philip died in 1955. Oliver was now the sole male survivor of the third generation of sugar Lyles. Oliver Lyle was a meticulous record-keeper, as can be seen in his pocketbook, which he carried around with him for over 30 years.

== Other activities ==
Lyle was an investor in Noel Macklin's Invicta Cars.

== Family ==
Lyle married Lilian Spicer in Chertsey, Surrey in 1914. The couple had five children. Their eldest son, John, went on to work in the family business.

== Honours ==
In 1919, Lyle was appointed an Officer of the Order of the British Empire. In the 1954 New Year Honours, he was knighted for services in promoting fuel efficiency.

== Publications ==
- The Efficient Use of Steam. H.M. Stationery Office. 1947. ISBN 9780114101305.
- Technology for sugar refinery workers. Chapman & Hall. 1950.
- The Plaistow Story. Tate & Lyle. 1960.
