= Railton (car) =

Marque of British automobiles

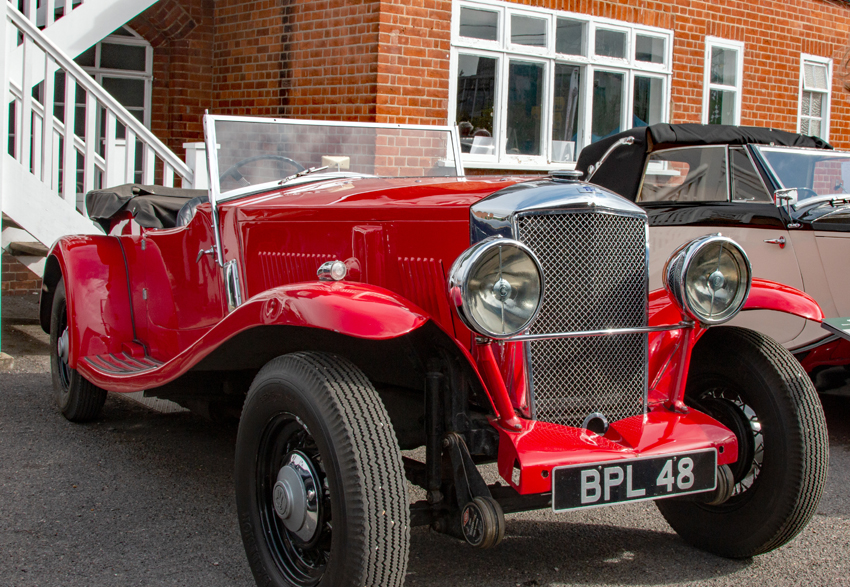
1934 Railton Terraplane at Brooklands Museum

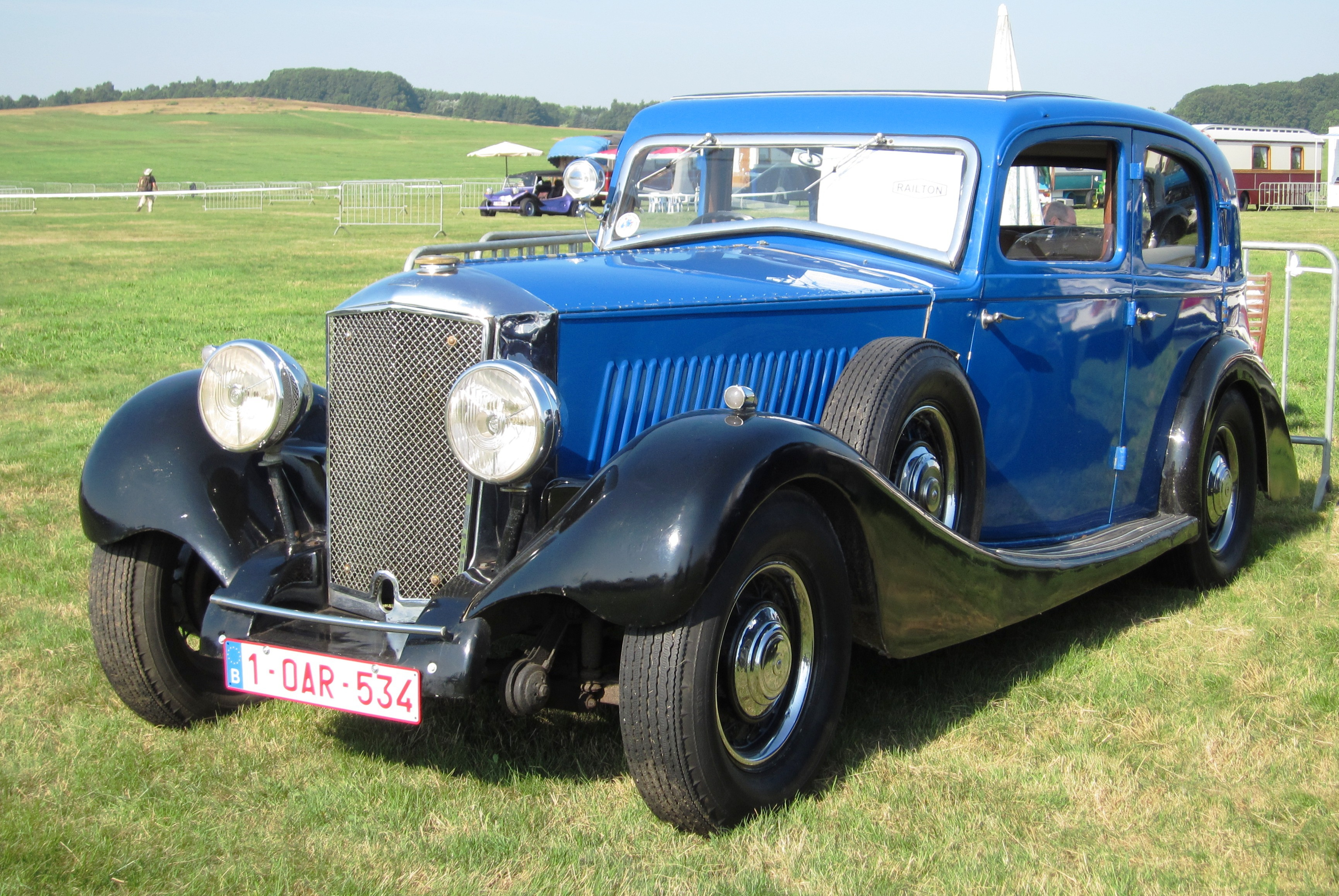
1935 Railton Straight Eight "University" saloon

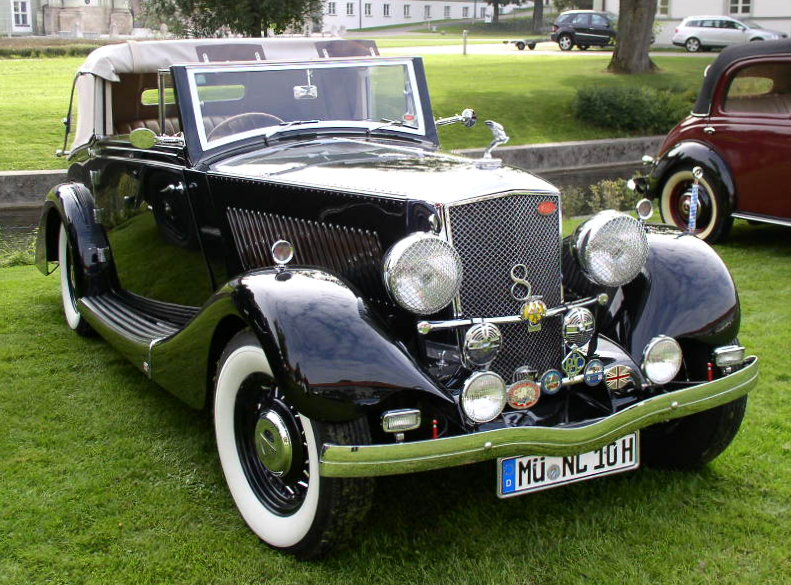
1936 Railton Straight Eight

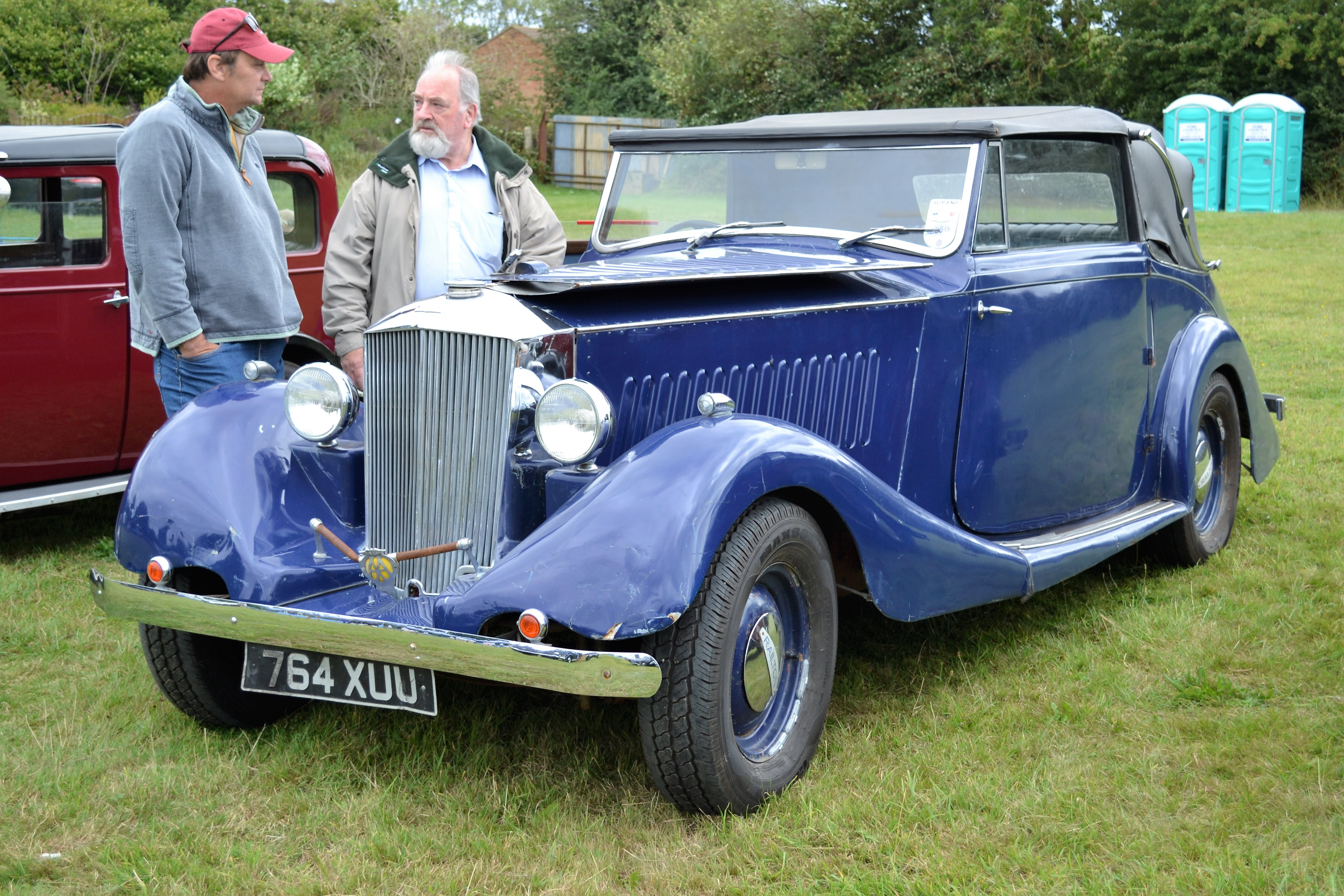
1937 Railton Claremont Drophead Coupe at Kensworth, summer 2016. Fitted with Hudson Straight 8

Railton was a marque of British automobiles made by Fairmile Engineering Company in Cobham, Surrey, between 1933 and 1940. The cars were the first combination of English coachwork with a U.S.-made engine and running gear.

There was an attempt to revive it by a new company between 1989 and 1994 in Alcester, Warwickshire.

== History ==
The company was started by Noel Macklin, who was looking for a new car-making venture after he sold his Invicta company in 1933. The name came from Reid Railton, the world speed record car designer, but his input was probably small, although he did receive a royalty on each car sold. The two decided that an English coachwork on a U.S.-built chassis with a powerful engine would result in a high-performance driving car. The idea came with imports of the Terraplane, a new model from Hudson's Essex division with a straight-eight engine. Macklin was impressed by the Terraplane's build quality, refinement, and performance, but not its American body styling.

=== 1933 – Railton Terraplane ===
The first car was made by fitting a British body made by coachbuilder John Charles & Co to a 4010 cc, 100 bhp (75 kW; 101 PS), 8-cylinder Hudson Terraplane chassis. The car has been described as a pre-war Shelby Cobra. The car was at first available as a two-door tourer. Being lighter than the original, it had strong performance for the time, with a 0–62 mph (100 km/h) time of 13 seconds. A saloon-bodied version was soon added to the range. The prices started at £499.

=== 1935 – Railton 8 ===
In 1935, the original Terraplane chassis was replaced with that of the Hudson Eight. The engine was now 4168 cc, producing 113 bhp (84 kW; 115 PS). A more comprehensive range of bodies from at least seven coachbuilders were available: Ranalah, R.E.A.L, Carbodies, and Coachcraft. Two unique lightweight models were made in 1935, capable of accelerating to 60 mph (97 km/h) in 8.8 seconds. A total of 1,379 of the Railton 8s were made.

=== 1937 – Railton Cobham ===
A smaller six-cylinder car, the 16.9, was added in 1937 using a 2723 cc Hudson 6-cylinder engine and chassis. A total of 81 were made in the saloon or drophead coupé form, with pricing starting at £399.

=== 1938 – Railton 10 ===
An even smaller Railton, the 10 hp, joined the range in 1938. They were built on a Standard Flying Nine chassis and with either saloon or drophead coupé bodywork was claimed to be "A famous name in miniature". A total of 51 were made selling at £299. In 1938, Motor Sport tested a 28.8 h.p. Railton Cobham saloon, FPH 970, offered for sale at £698.

=== 1939 – demise ===
Noel Macklin turned his attention to powerboats in 1939. He sold the company to Hudson Motor Car Company of Detroit, Michigan, who transferred production to their Brentford, London works. However, the outbreak of war in 1939 stopped production.

After World War II, a few cars were completed using pre-war parts, and a new model was built and shown at the 1949 London Motor Show. However, at nearly £5000, the new car was expensive and never went into production.

== 1989 – Railton revival ==
The name was revived by a new company called Railton Motor Company, founded in 1989 in Wixford, Warwickshire. The idea and design for a new car were by William Towns, an automobile designer and engineer who worked for the Rootes Group, Rover, and Aston Martin. Towns met John Ransom to finance the venture.

Two convertible models, the F28 Fairmile and the F29 Claremont, were announced in 1989. Both were styled by Towns and were based on Jaguar XJS running gear with new original aluminium bodywork. An objective was to have Jaguar dealerships sell and service the vehicles since the base XJS mechanical and interior were unchanged, with only the "aluminium skin tacked on the top" of the cars.

By 1991, two cars were built "from scratch". The F28 Fairmile was painted burgundy, and featured exposed oversized rear wheels and the F29 Claremont was done in blue with full rear fender skirts. In 1994, the rights and tooling were purchased by an entrepreneur, Graham Pierce, but the firm was officially reported as dormant the following year and fully dissolved on 4 July 2000.

British motoring journalist Paul Walton has written about the Railton F28 Fairmile.

== See also ==
- List of car manufacturers of the United Kingdom
