= U.S. ISDE Team =

The list of participants in the ISDT/ISDE (International Six Days Enduro) since the beginning event in 1913 that saw US citizens as contestants is divided into four segments; Ambassadors, Trailblazer, Pioneers and Qualified/Selected Participants 1971 and beyond. Ambassadors are men and women who competed in ISDT/ISDE at least 10 times in their career. Trailblazer is one man on a very early motorcycle. Pioneers were on more modern motorcycles. Qualified/Selected riders are 1971 and later participants who rode in AMA qualifiers or were appointed by the AMA based on prior performances.

== Participants ==
=== Ambassadors ===
Riding in 10 or more ISDT/ISDE Events

| Name | Events | Years | Notes |
|---|---|---|---|
| Jeff Fredette | 34 | 1978–14 | 11 Gold, 20 Silver, 2 Bronze, 1 DNF |
| Fred Hoess | 29 | 1984–21 | Member first Club Team win 1996 FIM Vintage Trophy Overall Winner 2016 Spain, 2022 Portugal |
| Drew Smith | 20 | 1975–99 | |
| Brian Storrie | 18 | 1994–22 | |
| Randy Hawkins | 18 | 1984–03 | AMA Hall of Fame inductee |
| Amanda Mastin | 14 | 2001–15 | Women's Trophy winning Team member 2007 |
| Larry Roeseler | 13 | 1978–94 | AMA Hall of Fame inductee |
| Jack Penton | 12 | 1970–85 | AMA Hall of Fame inductee |
| Dick Burleson | 12 | 1971–94 | AMA Hall of Fame inductee |
| Kurt Caselli | 12 | 2000–13 | Jr. Trophy winning Team member 2006 |
| Kevin Hines | 12 | 1982–95 | |
| Paul Krause | 11 | 1990–14,2019 | |
| Taylor Robert | 11 | 2010, 2012–19, 2021, 2023 | |
| Destry Abbott | 10 | 1997-2018 | 5 time AMA National Hare and Hound Champion |
| Carl Cranke | 10 | 1972–81 | AMA Hall of Fame inductee |
| Tom Penton | 10 | 1968–78 | |
| Curt Wilcox | 10 | 1991–02 | |

=== Trailblazer ===
1913

| Name | Years | Notes |
|---|---|---|
| T.K. "Teddy" Hastings | 1913 | First ISDT and first US entrant |

=== Pioneers ===
1949-1970

| First name | Last name | Years participated | Notes |
|---|---|---|---|
| Tommy | McDermott | 1949 | First Modern Gold Medal |
| Walt | Axthelm | 1960, 1965 | |
| Jim | Brunson | 1961 | |
| Bud | Ekins | 1961–1966 | First US Class winner 1962 |
| Lloyd | Lingelbach | 1961, 1965 | |
| John | Penton | 1962, 1965–70 | Canadian Team 1962; AMA National Enduro Champion |
| George | Stack, Jr. | 1962 | |
| Cliff | Coleman | 1964–1965 | |
| Dave | Ekins | 1964–1966, 1969–70 | First US Brothers 1964 |
| Paul | Hunt | 1964, 1970 | |
| Steve | McQueen | 1964 | American film actor |
| Stu | Peters | 1964 | AMA Hall of Fame inductee |
| Al | Rogers | 1964–1965, 1968 | |
| John | Smith | 1964 | |
| John | Steen | 1964 | |
| Bill | Stewart | 1964 | |
| John | Taylor | 1964 | |
| Mel | Green | 1965, 1969 | |
| C. | Boehler | 1965 | |
| Klims | Cox | 1965 | |
| Ed | Kretz, Jr. | 1965 | |
| Lars | Larson | 1965, 1967–73, 1975–76, 1978–79 | Swedish Team 1965, 1967; Mexican Team 1978–79 |
| Dale | Deyo | 1965, 1967 | |
| Nick | Nicholson | 1965 | |
| Mike | Patrick | 1965, 1969–71, 1973 | |
| Dale | Richardson | 1965, 1969–71 | |
| Brian | Slark | 1965 | AMA Hall of Fame Inductee, 2021 |
| Max | Switzer | 1965, 1970–71 | |
| Bill | Thorwaldson | 1965 | |
| Richard | Vick | 1965 | |
| Leroy | Winters | 1965–71 | |
| Jack | Krizman | 1966 | |
| C. Hookie | Hochderffer | 1966, 1969–70 | |
| Malcolm | Smith | 1966–1967, 1969–71, 1973–76 | Silver Vase winning team member 1973; AMA Hall of Fame inductee |
| Dean | Bemis | 1967 | |
| Dave | Mungenast | 1967–75 | Canadian Team member 1974 |
| John | Nelson | 1967, 1970 | |
| Bob | Arison | 1968–1969 | |
| Jim | Cameret | 1968 | |
| Bob | Ewing | 1968–70 | |
| Wolf | Jackson | 1968 | |
| Ted | Lapadakis | 1968–1969 | |
| Tom | Penton | 1968, 1970–78 | |
| Don | Watkins | 1968 | |
| Al | Baker | 1969 | |
| Ron | Bohn | 1969–74, 1977 | Silver Vase Winning Team member 1973; AMA National Enduro Champion |
| David | Eames | 1969, 1972–74 | |
| Bud | Green | 1969 | |
| Bob | Hicks | 1969–70 | |
| Dave | Latham | 1969, 1971–74 | Canadian Team member 1972 |
| Bob | Maus | 1969–70 | |
| Tommy | Maxwell | 1969 | |
| Jerry | Pacholke | 1969–72 | |
| Preston | Petty | 1969–71 | |
| John | Rice | 1969 | |
| Ed | Schmidt | 1969, 1971–75 | Canadian Team member 1969; Silver Vase Winning Team member 1973 |
| Billy | Uhl | 1969–74, 1976–77 | First son/father entry 1969; Count Lurani Trophy 1973 for top placing American rider at first US Six Days; AMA Hall of Fame inductee 2007 |
| Herb | Uhl | 1969–70 | First father/son entry 1969; Helped develop off-road version of Honda Super Cub, the Trail Cub, in 1960 |
| Bob | Armstrong | 1970 | |
| Don | Bohanan | 1970 | |
| Gene | Cannady | 1970–72 | |
| Tom | Canning | 1970 | |
| Don | Cutler | 1970–75 | |
| Bill | Friant | 1970 | |
| Barry | Higgins | 1970, 1972–73, 1975, 1977–79, 1982 | |
| Steve | Hurd | 1970–72 | |
| George | Johnson | 1970 | |
| Mike | Lewis | 1970–71 | |
| James Whitey | Martino | 1970 | |
| Bill | Messer | 1970 | |
| Lewis | Milligan | 1970 | |
| Jack | Penton | 1970–77, 1979–80, 1985 | AMA Hall of Fame inductee |
| Jeff | Penton | 1970, 1972–73 | |
| Gordon | Rasse | 1970 | |
| Bob | Rogstat | 1970 | |
| Richard | Smith | 1970 | |
| Charles | Whitten | 1970 | |
| Doug | Wilford | 1970, 1973–75 | |

=== Qualified/Selected Competitors (AMA/FIM) ===
1971–Present

| First name | Last name | Years participated | Notes |
|---|---|---|---|
| Ken | Harvey | 1973 | |
| Chuck | Boechler | 1971 | |
| Dick | Burleson | 1971–80, 1982, 1994 | Silver Vase Winning Team member 1973; 8 time AMA National Enduro Champion; AMA Hall of Fame inductee |
| Frank | Diaz | 1971 | |
| Les | Grable | 1971, 1973 | |
| Ron | Jeckel | 1971 | |
| Jack | Lehto | 1971 | |
| Dane | Leimbach | 1971–78, 1980 | |
| Bren | Moran | 1971, 1973, 1975 | Canadian Team Member 1975 (fatality) |
| J.N. | Roberts | 1971–72 | |
| Gary | Surdyke | 1971–75 | |
| Charlie | Vincent | 1971–75 | |
| Ron | Webster | 1971 | |
| Carl | Berggren | 1972 | |
| Joe | Carson | 1972, 1974 | Canadian Team Member 1974 |
| Tom | Clark | 1973 | |
| Carl | Crank | 1972–81 | |
| Jake | Fisher | 1972–73 | Silver Vase Winning Team member 1973 |
| Bob | Grodzinski | 1972 | |
| Jeff | Heininger | 1972 | |
| Jim | Holiander | 1972–76 | |
| Bill | Kain | 1972 | |
| Ron | Lamastus | 1972-76, 1978–79 | US Trophy Team awarded the Walting Trophy |
| Fran | Piasecki | 1972–75 1977–78 | |
| Dan | Stover | 1972–74 | |
| Buck | Walsworth | 1972 | |
| Joe | Barker | 1973–74 | |
| Ron | Bishop | 1973, 1975 | |
| Ben | Bower | 1973–74, 1976 | |
| Paul | Danik | 1973–74 | |
| Jim | Fogle | 1973, 1975, 1977 | |
| John | Greenrose | 1973 | |
| Ken | Maahs | 1973–76 | |
| Jim | Simmons | 1973–76, 1978 | Mexican Team Member 1978 |
| Gary | Snider | 1973 | |
| Jim | Sparks | 1973 | |
| Stellan | Tingstrom | 1973 | |
| Mark | Adent | 1974 | |
| Rod | Bush | 1974–78, 1980 | |
| Steve | Hess | 1974 | |
| Bob | Ismalof | 1974 | |
| Tom | Shaw | 1974 | |
| John | Sitton | 1974 | |
| Danny | Young | 1974–75 | |
| David | Ashley | 1975–76 | |
| Charlie | Bethards | 1975–76 | |
| Chris | Carter | 1975–77 | |
| Gary | Edmond | 1975–76, 1978 | |
| Jeff | Gerber | 1975–76 | |
| Jerry | Harris | 1975 | |
| Bill | Hoffman | 1975 | |
| David | Julse | 1975–79 | |
| Kevin | Lavoie | 1975 | |
| Dick | Mann | 1975 | |
| Max | Markowitz | 1975, 1979 | |
| Stan | Rubottom | 1975–76 | |
| Drew | Smith | 1975–85, 1987–88, 1990–92 1994–95, 1997–99 | |
| Danny | Vandercar | 1975–76, 1978–79 | |
| Ken | Williams | 1975 | |
| Gary | Younkins | 1975–77 | |
| Don | Cichocki | 1976–79 | |
| John | Fero | 1976–80 | |
| Frank | Gallo | 1976–79, 1981 | |
| Bill | Geier | 1976 | |
| Mike | Hannon | 1976 | |
| Harry | Heilmann | 1976 | |
| Jeff | Hill | 1976–81 | |
| Earl | Law | 1976 | |
| Mike | Rosso | 1976–81 | |
| Larry | Thompson | 1976–77 | |
| Rick | Weathersbee | 1976 | |
| Kenny | Bruce | 1977–78 | |
| Roy | Cook | 1977 | |
| Greg | Davis | 1977–80 | |
| Mark | Deyo | 1977 | |
| Mikie | Deyo | 1977 | |
| Jeff | Hammond | 1977 | |
| Ted | Leimbach | 1977–79 | |
| Rick | Munyon | 1977, 1980 | |
| Bobby | Pearce | 1977, 1979–80, 1982, 1985 | |
| Nate | Pillsbiry | 1977 | |
| Bob | Popiel | 1977–79 | |
| Jim | Smith, Jr. | 1977 | |
| Ted | Worrell | 1977 | |
| A.C. | Bakken | 1978–79 | |
| Fred | Cameron | 1978 | Mexican Team Member 1978 |
| Alan | Deyo | 1978, 1998, 2000–01, 2003–04, 2006 | |
| Jim | Fishback | 1978–80 | |
| Jeff | Fredette | 1978–81, 1983–89, 1991–95, 1997–14 | AMA Hall of Fame inductee |
| Toml | Krehbiel | 1978 | |
| Mike | Melton | 1978–83 | AMA National Enduro Champion |
| Kevin | Piasecki | 1978–79 | |
| Russ | Powell | 1978 | |
| Larry | Roseler | 1978–89, 1994 | 10 time Baja 1000 Overall winner |
| Don | Schuler | 1978 | |
| Steve | Whitworth | 1978 | |
| John | Ayers | 1979–80 | |
| Bill | Berroth | 1979–80 | |
| Ray | Cosgrove | 1979–82 | |
| Terry | Cunningham | 1979–82, 1988–89, 1999 | 4 time AMA National Enduro Champion |
| Kevin | Davis | 1979, 1982–83, 1992, 1997 | |
| Terry | Davis | 1979 | |
| Tim | Hopey | 1979 | |
| Darryl | Kuenzer | 1979–80 | |
| Ed | Lojak | 1979–83, 1985 | 9 time AMA GNCC Champion |
| Randy | Mastin | 1979, 1982, 1996–97/00–02 | First father/son/daughter Entry 2001 |
| Hans | Raidel | 1979 | |
| Ron | Ribolzi | 1979–83, 1987, 1994 | |
| Dwight | Rudder | 1979, 1981–82, 1987–89, 1994 | |
| Steve | VanWatermeulen | 1979–80 | |
| Carl | Altier | 1980 | |
| Bob | Avery | 1980 | |
| Kevin | Brown | 1980–81, 1983–85 | |
| Matt | Cullins | 1980 | |
| Scott | Harden | 1980–82 | |
| Mark | Hyde | 1980–84, 87 | |
| Jack | Johnson | 1980–81 | |
| Dean | Joyner | 1980–81 | |
| John | Martin | 1980–81, 85 | |
| Chuck | Miller | 1980, 1982, 1986 | 2 time BAJA 500 Overall Winning Team Member 1980 & 1982 2 time BAJA 1000 Overall Winning Team Member 1984 & 1986 |
| Bruce | Ogilvie | 1980–81, 86 | AMA Hall of Fame inductee 2 time Baja 1000 Winning Team Member |
| Jim | Piasecki | 1980 | |
| Rusty | Reynaud | 1980–81 | |
| Frank | Stacy | 1980–81, 1983 | |
| Scott | Atchison | 1981 | |
| Vic | Ely | 1981, 1983–84 | |
| Chip | Howell | 1981, 1983 | |
| Fritz | Kadlec | 1981, 1983–89 | |
| Gray | Leonard | 1981 | |
| Joe | Lojak | 1981–83 | |
| Ray | Mungenast | 1981–85 | |
| Morris | Norman | 1981 | |
| Terry | Seales | 1981 | |
| Wally | Wilson | 1981–84 | |
| Alan | Zitta | 1981 | |
| Tom | Buckles | 1982, 1985 | |
| Zack | Elkins | 1982, 1984 | |
| Morrill | Griffith | 1982 | |
| Kevin | Hines | 1982–85, 1987–95 | AMA National Enduro Champion |
| Glen | Hollingshead | 1982 | |
| Alvin | McCannon | 1982 | |
| Keith | Moore | 1982 | |
| John | Blythe | 1983 | |
| Barrett | Brown | 1983, 1990 | |
| Scott | Ely | 1983 | |
| Jim | Norris | 1983–84, 1989, 1994 | |
| Jeff | Russell | 1983–86, 1989, 1994 | AMA National Enduro Champion |
| Dan | Sinkoff | 1983 | |
| Drigan | Wieder | 1983 | |
| Geoff | Ballard | 1984–86 | |
| Dave | Bertram | 1984–91 | |
| Bob | Elliot | 1984 | |
| James | Gunselman | 1984 | |
| John | Haaker | 1984–85, 1988 | |
| Charles | Halcomb | 1984, 1986, 1988–890 | |
| Randy | Hawkins | 1984–00, 2003 | AMA Hall of Fame inductee 7 time AMA National Enduro Champion |
| Fred | Hoess | 1984–96/00–16, 2021 | Member of first winning US Club Team 1996 Vintage Overall Winner 2016 Spain, 2022 Portugal |
| Brian | Mull | 1984–86, 1988–90 | |
| Bob | Shillinger | 1984–85 | |
| Joe | Coppege | 1985 | |
| David | Crain | 1985–86, 1993 | |
| Bill | Fulmer | 1985 | |
| Jim | Garmon | 1985 | |
| Mark | Hynes | 1985 | |
| Jeff | Irwin | 1985, 1987–88 | |
| Dennis | Larrat | 1985–86 | |
| Jeff | Miller | 1985 | |
| Ron | Naylor | 1985 | |
| Bill | Perkins | 1985, 1990, 1992 | |
| Alan | Randt | 1985, 1990, 1992 | AMA National Enduro Director |
| Mike | Toole | 1985 | |
| Les | Wolfe | 1985 | |
| Bob | Bean | 1986–87, 1989 | |
| Reed | Bright | 1986–87 | |
| Kurt | Hough | 1986–89 | |
| Duke | Lambert | 1986 | |
| John | Nielson | 1986–88, 1990, 1995–96 | Member of first winning US Club Team 1996 |
| Pete | Postel | 1986 | |
| Tim | Shepard | 1986, 1994 | |
| Jim | Stenfield | 1986 | |
| Scott | Summers | 1986, 1989, 1994, 1996, 1998 | AMA Hall of Fame inductee 5 time AMA GNCC Champion; 4 time AMA National Hare Scramble Champion |
| Greg | Surdyke | 1986, 1989, 1990, 1994 | |
| George | Waller, Jr. | 1986 | |
| Allan | Wickstrand | 1986 | |
| William | Burgener | 1987 | |
| Dave | Burke, Jr. | 1987 | |
| Todd | Harris | 1987–88 | |
| Aaron | Hough | 1987–89 | |
| Ed | Marchini | 1987 | |
| Mike | Medick | 1987 | |
| Grant | Palenske | 1987–89, 1997 | |
| Shaun | Scarlet | 1987 | |
| Donnie | Simone | 1987, 1989, 1992 | |
| Rick | Daniel | 1988 | |
| Scott | Drafs | 1988–89, 1990 | |
| Gary | Hazel | 1988, 1990 | |
| Charles | Kouba | 1988 | |
| Scott | Lathrop | 1988, 1992 | |
| Robert | Neeley, Jr. | 1988 | |
| David | Rhodes | 1988–89, 1990–93, 1995–96 | Junior Trophy Winning Team member 1991 |
| Matt | Stavish | 1988, 1990, 1994/00 | |
| Joseph | Zierman | 1988 | |
| Jeremy | Garber | 1989 | |
| Taz | Harvey | 1989, 1990 | |
| Danny | LaPorte | 1989 | AMA Hall of Fame inductee AMA National Motocross Champion 3 time Baja 1000 Winning Team Member |
| Jimmy | Lewis | 1989–92 | Junior Trophy Winning Team member 1991 3rd Overall Dakar Rally 2000 |
| Jim | Lyngar | 1989 | |
| Kelby | Pepper | 1989–92 | |
| Dan | Richardson | 1989 | |
| Teme | Singleton | 1989-94 | |
| J.D. | Bently | 1990 | |
| Jason | Dahners | 1990–91, 1993, 1995–96, 1998, 2000, 2005 | |
| Gary | Doerr | 1990–91 | |
| Phil | Douglas | 1990, 1994 | |
| Lyle | Duronso | 1990–91, 1994 | |
| Steve | Hatch | 1990–93, 1995–97 | Junior Trophy Winning Team member 1991 |
| Shawn | Hybarger | 1990–91 | |
| Wayne | Keezer | 1990 | |
| Paul | Krause | 1990–94, 1999–02, 2014, 2019 | 2019 AMA National Hare and Hound 40+ A Champion |
| Brian | Lohman | 1990 | |
| John | May | 1990, 1995–96 | |
| Robb | Masecher | 1990, 1995 | |
| Paul | Ostbo | 1990 | |
| Darren | Sanford | 1990, 1992 | |
| Brian | Walker | 1990, 1998 | |
| Tom | Webb | 1990–92, 1994 | |
| David | Bowers | 1991–92 | |
| Raymond | Davis | 1991 | |
| Bruce | Field | 1991, 1994 | |
| James | Gray | 1991–92, 1995–96 | |
| Doug | Jones | 1991, 1994 | |
| Jonathon | King | 1991–92 | |
| Ron | Lawson | 1991, 1993, 1995–96, 1998, 2000 | |
| Richard | Mathers | 1991 | |
| Dan | Nielson | 1991–92 | |
| Jeff | Odom | 1991, 1994 | |
| Blain | Ostafin | 1991, 1994 | |
| Rob | Riley | 1991 | |
| Peter | Ruggiero | 1991 | |
| Chris | Smith | 1991–92–93, 1995–96, 1996–97, 1998 | Junior Trophy Winning Team member 1991 |
| Curt | Wilcox | 1991–92, 1994, 1996–97, 1998, 2000–02 | |
| Klen | Brown | 1992 | |
| Tom | Ebersole | 1992–96 | |
| Danny | Hamel | 1992, 1994 | AMA Hall of Fame inductee 5 time AMA National Hare and Hound Champion 3 time Baja 1000 Winning Team Member |
| Dan | Harte | 1992–92–94, 1996 | |
| Todd | Mathwig | 1992 | |
| Scott | McLaughlin | 1992–96 | |
| John | Moody | 1992–93 | |
| Bruce | Rust | 1992 | |
| Rodney | Smith | 1992–98, 2003 | 5 time AMA GNCC Champion |
| Steven | Smith | 1992 | |
| Dwain | Taylor | 1992 | |
| Tommy | Ady | 1993, 1995–97 | |
| Bob | Vechtel | 1992–94 | |
| Kevin | Bennett | 1993, 1997–98, 2001 | |
| Chad | Carlisle | 1992–94 | |
| Josh | Chandler | 1993 | |
| Kerry | Clark | 1993, 1995–97 | |
| Ty | Davis | 1993–99, 2003 | AMA Hall of Fame inductee 3 time AMA National Hare and Hound Champion 2 time AMA National Enduro Champion AMA Supercross Champion |
| Doug | Deaton | 1993 | |
| Randy | DuBois | 1993 | |
| Jason | Edie | 1993 | |
| Pat | Garrahan | 1993, 1995, 1997, 1998, 1999–06 | |
| Marc | Grossman | 1992–94, 1997 | |
| Robert | Johnson | 1992–94, 1996 | |
| Don | Knapp | 1992–94, 1996 | |
| Mark | Lambert | 1993 | |
| Mark | Ruple | 1993, 1995 | |
| William | Rush | 1993, 1995, 1998, 1999–01, 2007 | |
| Steve | Silvestri | 1990–01 | |
| Steve | Travis | 1992–94 | |
| Jim P. | Walker | 1993 | |
| Josh | Whitaker | 1993 | |
| Keith | Allen | 1994 | |
| Kevin | Allen | 1994 | |
| Terry | Bender | 1994 | |
| A.J. | Bila | 1994 | |
| David | Booth | 1994, 2009 | |
| Louis | Carpenter | 1994 | |
| Stephen | Chapkovich | 1994 | |
| Guy | Cooper | 1994, 1996 | Member of First winning US Club Team 1996 AMA National Motocross Champion |
| Vincent | Davis | 1994, 1996 | 1994 Junior Trophy team |
| John | Delagnes | 1994 | |
| Eric | DuCray | 1995–96, 1998, 2005–06 | |
| Karl | Fahringer | 1994 | |
| Ken | Faught | 1994 | |
| Pat | Flynn | 1994, 1998, 2003 | |
| Brian | Garrahan | 1995–96–97, 1998, 1990–03, 2015 | Top US Club Team Rider 2015 |
| Chuck | Gehr | 1994 | |
| Lisa | Gibson | 1995–96 | First of two US Women to Enter ISDE |
| Chris | Graber | 1994, 1997 | |
| Robb | Grill | 1994 | |
| Tim | Hart | 1994 | |
| Rick | Higgins | 1994, 1998 | |
| Scott | Hoffman | 1994, 1997/00 | |
| Greg | Holden | 1994 | |
| Jeff | Horton | 1994 | |
| Matt | Kerling | 1995–96 | |
| David | Klein | 1994, 2002 | |
| Eric | Koeller | 1994, 1996 | |
| Mike | Koening | 1994 | |
| Ed | Lachance | 1994 | |
| Randy | Lewis | 1994 | |
| Donny | Lingle | 1994 | |
| David | Lykke | 1994 | |
| Matthew | Lyman | 1994 | |
| Eric | Mashbir | 1994 | |
| Mike | McCarren | 1994, 1996, 2002, 2004 | |
| Denny | Mesward | 1994 | |
| Scott | Meyer | 1995–96 | |
| Tim | Mount | 1994 | |
| Dennis | Murphy | 1994 | |
| Kenny | Norris | 1994 | |
| Vern | Pacholke | 1994 | |
| Robert | Possehl | 1994 | |
| Jason | Raines | 1994, 1998, 2003 | |
| Steve | Reschke | 1994 | |
| David | Sutterfield | 1994 | |
| John | Scheidhauer | 1994 | |
| Mark | Seals | 1994 | |
| Kevin | Sessions | 1994 | |
| Michael | Shim | 1994 | |
| Stormy | Sims | 1994 | |
| Dean | Spencer | 1994 | |
| Chris | Storrie | 2012 | |
| Brian | Storrie | 1994, 1996–99, 2002, 2004, 2007, 2012–14 15, 2016–19, 2021–22 | Participated both as a World Junior Team and Senior Club Team Rider |
| Clark | Tiainen | 1994 | |
| Rick | Tong | 1994 | |
| Steve | Trinies | 1994 | |
| David | Wells | 1994 | |
| Larry | White | 1994 | |
| Carol | Williams | 1994 | First of two US Women to Enter ISDE |
| Charlie | Williams | 1994 | |
| Darren | Williams | 1994 | |
| Steve | Zoll | 1994 | |
| Kevin | Bailey | 1995 | |
| Michael | Callaghan | 1995 | |
| Russell | Cherry Jr. | 1995, 2001 | |
| Jim | Conner | 1995, 1996, 1998, 1999, 2007–08 | |
| Rodney | Goehring | 1995 | |
| Jason | Hendrix | 1995 | |
| Ron | Schmeizle | 1995, 1997, 2000–03, 2006–07, 2012 | |
| Matt | Spigelmyer | 1995, 1996–97 | |
| Lori | Taylor | 1995 | |
| Marty | Walden | 1995 | |
| Greg | Zitterkopf | 1995 | AMA National Hare and Hound Champion |
| Lynn | Bailey | 1996, 1998 | |
| Travis | Bamford | 1996 | |
| Brian | Bennett | 1996/00–01 | |
| Jeraid | Brownell | 1996 | |
| Kelly | Crenshaw | 1996 | |
| Richard | Crossland | 1996 | |
| Manny | Garza | 1996 | |
| William | Hamilton | 1996, 2004 | |
| Jeff | Kirchner | 1996, 1998 | |
| Andy | Knapp | 1996 | |
| Mike | Lafferty | 1996–97, 1998, 2003 | 8 time AMA National Enduro Champion |
| Tom | Parfitt | 1996 | |
| Ken | Tomeo | 1996, 2002 | |
| Rip | Woodward | 1996 | |
| Kevin | Yarnell | 1996 | |
| Destry | Abbott | 1997, 1998, 1990–00, 2008–12, 2018 | 5 time AMA National Hare and Hound Champion |
| Bruce | Bell | 1997 | |
| Sam | Buffa | 1997, 2006, 2010, 2013 | |
| David | Campbell | 1997, 1998/00 | |
| Johnny | Campbell | 1997 | |
| Eric | Cleveland | 1997, 1998, 2007 | |
| Troy | Goetz | 1997 | |
| Russell | Piggott | 1997, 1998 | |
| Mike | Sanders | 1997 | |
| Ryan | Simpson | 1997 | |
| Scott | Strech | 1997 | |
| Matt | Wallace | 1997 | |
| Joey | Ambrosini | 1998 | |
| Heath | Bennett | 1998 | |
| Donnie | Book | 1994, 1998 | |
| David | Brag | 1998 | |
| Cole | Marshall | 1998 | |
| Robbie | Jenks | 1998, 2003 | |
| Rodney | Judson | 1998 | |
| James | Kelly | 1998 | |
| Jeremy | Ketchum | 1998, 1999, 2006, 2010 | |
| Erik | Kohler | 1998 | |
| Mike | Monroe | 1998, 2000, 2003, 2006, 2010 | |
| Ron | Palermo | 1998 | |
| Russ | Pearson | 1998, 1990–01 | 3 time AMA National Hare and Hound Champion |
| Lonnie | Ross | 1998, 2000 | |
| Shaun | Wilcox | 1998, 2001 | |
| Mike | Windmann | 1998, 1999 | |
| Robbie | Zimmerman | 1998, 2001, 2003 | |
| Clay | Boreing | 1999 | |
| Brian | Brown | 1999 | AMA National Hare and Hound Champion |
| Zach | Ivey | 1999 | |
| Nolan | Knight | 1990–00 | |
| Mark | Milloer | 1999 | |
| Dave | Neumeister | 1999 | |
| John | Ross | 1999 | |
| Mark | Stevens | 1990–00 | |
| Steve | Swenson | 1999 | |
| Mark | Adkins | 2000 | |
| John | Beal | 2000–01, 2021–23 | |
| Joe | Cartwright | 2000 | |
| Kurt | Caselli | 2000, 2003–13 | Junior Trophy Winning Team member 2006 3 time AMA National Hare and Hound Champion |
| Mark | Geary | 2000 | |
| Nathan | Knight | 2000 | |
| Richard | Lafferty | 2000 | |
| Glen | Martinson | 200–01 | |
| Cody | Mastin | 2000, 2002, 2004–05 | First Father/Son/Daughter Entry 2001 |
| Alex | McElyea | 2000 | |
| David | Pearson | 2000–02, 2003, 2006 | Junior Trophy Winning Team member 2006 AMA National Hare and Hound Champion |
| Troy | Smith | 2000 | |
| Brian | Sperle | 2000–02, 2006, 2009–10 | |
| Jim | Taber | 2000, 2002, 2004 | |
| Luca | Trussardi | 2000 | |
| Steve | Vanzant | 2000 | |
| John | Bennett | 2001 | |
| Nicole | Bradford | 2001, 2006–08, 2009–10–11, 2016 | Women's Trophy Winning Team member 2007 |
| Mark | Faulik | 2001, 2004 | |
| Marc | Germain | 2001 | |
| Anthony | Glasso | 2001 | |
| Ben | Hale | 2001 | |
| J.D. | Hammock | 2001–02, 2004–05 | |
| Mandi | Mastin | 2001–02, 2003–04, 2006–13 14, 2015 | Women's Trophy Winning Team member 2007 First Father/Son/Daughter Entry 2001 |
| Luke | McNeil | 2001–02, 2003, 2005–06, 2008 | |
| Suzy | Moody | 2001 | |
| Todd | Morain | 2001 | |
| Steve | Morefield | 2001, 2005, 2007, 2010 | |
| Nick | Pearson | 2001, 2004 | |
| Jeremy | Puma | 2001, 2003 | |
| Jonathan | Seehorn | 2001–02, 2003, 2006, 2022 | |
| Derek | Steahly | 2001, 2003, 200–06, 2012 | |
| Tim | Stowe | 2001 | |
| Craig | Wesner | 2001 | |
| Dave | Wolfe | 2001–02 | |
| Eric | Bailey | 2002 | |
| Lance | Bross | 2002 | |
| Morgan | Crawford | 2002–03 | |
| Eric | Croy | 2002 | |
| Ryan | Dean | 2002 | |
| Carroll | Dickerson | 2002 | |
| Brett | Dooley | 2002 | |
| Greg | Gilliam | 2002–03, 2006, 2011 | |
| Andy | Gutish | 2002 | |
| Tom | Huber | 2002 | |
| Derrick | Merrill | 2002 | |
| Eric | Muberg | 2002 | |
| Wallace | Palmer | 2002–05, 2010 | |
| William | Radecky | 2002 | |
| Gabriel | Reos | 2002 | |
| Andy | Stokely | 2002 | |
| Mark | Thompson | 2002–03 | |
| Steve | Underwood | 2002 | |
| Lars | Valin | 2002–10 | |
| John | Wells | 2002–03 | |
| Chilly | White | 2002, 2004, 2008, 2009 | |
| John | Yates | 2002, 2005, 2007 | |
| Lissa | Arsnault | 2003 | |
| Eric | Bee | 2003 | |
| Doug | Blackwell | 2003 | |
| Russell | Bobbit | 2003, 2005–07, 2009, 2011–12 | Junior Trophy Winning Team member 2006 5 time AMA National Enduro Champion |
| John | Burgard, JR | 2003 | |
| Barry | Hawk, JR | 2003 | 8 time AMA GNCC Champion |
| Mike | Kiedrowski | 2003 | AMA Hall of Fame inductee 4 time AMA National Motocross Champion 3 time Motocross Des Nations winning Team Member |
| Aaron | Kopp | 2003, 2005–06 | |
| Steven | Kreiss | 2003–04 | |
| Rod | Kreiss | 2003, 2006 | |
| Heidi | Landon | 2003 | |
| Eric | Lojak | 2003 | |
| Shawn | Mason | 2003 | |
| Paul | Neff | 2003–04, 2006 | |
| Bryan | Olson | 2003 | |
| Bryan | Penny | 2003 | |
| Mike | Sigety | 2003 | |
| Ben | Smith | 2003, 2007–09, 2011 | |
| Jasion | Webb | 2003 | |
| Aaron | Wilson | 2003 | |
| John | Barber | 2004–05, 2012 | |
| Jeff | Bauer | 2004 | |
| Matthew | Buckner | 2004 | |
| Mark | Buckholz | 2004 | |
| Dylan | Debel | 2004 | |
| Raymond | Geimer | 2004 | |
| Greg | Ghione | 2004 | |
| Daniel | Janus | 2004–05, 2007 | |
| Jimmy | Jarrett | 2004–05, 2007–08, 2010–11, 2013, 2016 | |
| Nathan | Kanney | 2004, 2008–09, 2011 | |
| Scott | Klamfoth | 2004 | |
| Kyle | Nelson | 2004 | |
| Ryan | Powell | 2004–05, 2008–09, 2016–17 | |
| Elmer | Simons | 2004 | |
| Brian | Barns | 2005 | |
| Scott | Bright | 2005, 2007, 2012–13 | |
| Quinn | Cody | 2005 | 4 time Baja 1000 Winner |
| Theodore | Hahn | 2005–06 | |
| Jay | Hall | 2005 | |
| Brandon | Johnson | 2005–06 | |
| Mark | Johnson | 2005 | |
| Mike | Jolly | 2005, 2007, 2012 | |
| Richard | Jung | 2005 | |
| David | Kamo | 2005–09 | |
| Rich | Libengood | 2005 | |
| Wes | McKnight | 2005, 2007 | |
| Donald | Murry | 2005 | |
| Rick | Thomas | 2005 | |
| Jordan | Brandt | 2006–07, 2009–10, 2012 | |
| Michael | Bronn | 2006 | |
| Ricky | Deitrich | 2006, 2008–09 | Junior Trophy Winning Team member 2006 |
| Mason | Harris | 2006, 2008 | |
| Lacy | Jones | 2006–07, 2009 | Women's Trophy Winning Team member 2007 |
| Cole | Kirkpatrick | 2006–07 | |
| Steve | Leivan | 2006 | |
| Walker | Luedtke | 2006 | |
| Rory | Sullivan | 2006–09 | |
| Dab | Thoren | 2006 | |
| Annell | Allen | 2007–08 | |
| Cooper | Bailey | 2007 | |
| Bryce | Bingham | 2007 | |
| Bert | Bradford | 2007 | |
| Matthew | Bucher | 2007 | Awarded the Valencia Cup |
| Jordan | Chambliss | 2007 | |
| Lucas | Comeaux | 2007 | |
| Dennis | Decker | 2007–08, 2011 | |
| Joe | Giordano | 2007–08 | |
| Steve | Gordon | 2007 | |
| Brian | Hasslen | 2007 | |
| Robert | Heinzerling | 2007, 2011 | |
| Don | Hiogan | 2007 | |
| Kevin | Hutchinson | 2007–08 | |
| John | Maier | 2007, 2012, 2017 | |
| Jeff | O'Leary | 2007, 2013, 2022 | |
| Paul | Reschke | 2007 | |
| Troy | Swettenam | 2007 | |
| William | Burns | 2008–10, 2012 | |
| John | Dow | 2008 | |
| Maria | Forsberg | 2008–09 | 4 time AMA GNCC Champion 3 time X Games Gold Medalist AMA Racing Female Athlete of the Year |
| Nolan | Irwin | 2008, 2010 | |
| Eric | Jordan | 2008 | |
| Kyle | Kubitschek | 2008 | |
| Justin | Lipana | 2008 | |
| Sean | Sullivan | 2008 | |
| Dennis | Sweeten | 2008 | |
| Sean | White | 2008 | |
| Nathan | Woods | 2008, 2010 | |
| Toby | Atkins | 2009 | |
| Joel | Burkett | 2009 | |
| Cory | Buttrick | 2009 | |
| Nick | Fahringer | 2009–10, 2013 | |
| Don | Grahn | 2009 | |
| Nick | Hamill | 2009, 2012 | |
| Damon | Huffman | 2009 | 2 time AMA Supercross Champion |
| Jamie | Lanza | 2009 | |
| Zach | Lipana | 2009 | |
| Brent | Martell | 2009, 2011 | |
| Garrett | Mayer | 2009 | |
| Shawn | O'Leary | 2009, 2013, 2022 | |
| Timmy | Weigand | 2009–10 | 3 time Baja 1000 Winning Team Member |
| Michael | Berenbak | 2010 | |
| Ian | Blythe | 2010–11, 2013 | Brazilian National Enduro Champion |
| Michael | Brown | 2010, 2012–15 | AMA National Motocross Champion |
| Andrew | Delong | 2010–14 | AMA National Enduro Champion |
| Duell | Murphy | 2010 | |
| Cory | Pincock | 2010 | |
| Taylor | Robert | 2010, 2012–19, 2021, 2023 | 2016,2019, 2023 World Trophy Winning Team Member ISDE Individual Overall Winner 2016 World Enduro GP Event winner 2016 |
| Cody | Shafer | 2010–11, 2014 | |
| Anthony | Simontacchi | 2010 | |
| Shawn | Strong | 2010 | |
| Kerri | Swratz | 2010–11 | |
| Jarkko | Vainio | 2010–11 | |
| Donald | Williams | 2010 | |
| Chase | Bishop | 2011 | |
| James | Friebel | 2011 | |
| Max | Gerston | 2011 | |
| William | Petty | 2011 | |
| Michael | Sanders | 2011 | |
| Glen | Scherer | 2011 | |
| Colton | Udall | 2011 | 4 time Baja 1000 Winning Team Member |
| Devan | Bolin | 2012, 2017 | |
| Reid | Brown | 2012, 2015, 2021 | |
| Nick | Canny | 2012 | |
| Travis | Coy | 2012, 2014, 2018 | |
| Thad | Duvall | 2012–17 | World Trophy Winning Team Member 2016 AMA Full Gas Sprint Enduro Champion |
| Jesse | Groemm | 2012–13 | |
| Rachel | Gutish | 2012–16, 2021–24 | 2021, 2023, 2024 Women's Trophy Winning team member |
| Zach | Klamoth | 2012 | |
| Josh | Knight | 2012–14, 2019, 2021 | |
| Charlie | Mullins | 2012–14 | AMA GNCC Champion AMA National Enduro Champion |
| Sarah | Whitmore | 2012 | |
| Grant | Baylor | 2013–19 | 2014 Junior Trophy Winning Team Member |
| Keith | Cutris | 2013 | |
| Alex | Dorsey | 2013–14, 2016, 2024 | |
| Brooke | Hodges | 2013 | |
| Trevor | Kline | 2013 | |
| Ryan | Kudla | 2013, 2015, 2018 | 2016–17 AMA AMRA Champion |
| Zack | Osborne | 2013–14 | 2017 East AMA 250 Supercross Champion 2017 AMA 250 Motocross Champion |
| Kailub | Russell | 2013–17,2019,2022 | 2016, 2019 World Trophy Winning Team Member 8 time AMA GNCC Champion AMA National Enduro Champion 2 time AMA Full Gas Sprint Enduro Champion |
| Jeremy | Shoning | 2013, 2023 | |
| Ryan | Sipes | 2013, 2015, 2017–19, 2021 | 2015 ISDE Individual Overall Winner 2019 World Trophy Winning Team Member |
| Justin | Sode | 2013 | |
| Sarah | Baldwin | 2013 | |
| Steward | Baylor | 2014–16, 2018–19 | Junior Trophy Winning Team Member 2014 5 time AMA National Enduro Champion 2017 AMA Full Gas Sprint Enduro Champion 2019 World Trophy Winning Team Member |
| Trevor | Bollinger | 2014, 2016 | Junior Trophy Winning Team Member 2014 |
| Justin | Jones | 2014 | Junior Trophy Winning Team Member 2014 |
| Benjamin | Kelley | 2014–19 | Top US Club Team Rider 2017 2018 AMA GNCC XC2 Champion |
| John | Kelley | 2014–15 | |
| Alexander | Lehr | 2014–16, 2018, 2021 | |
| Kyle | McDonald | 2014–15 | |
| Michael | Pillar | 2014–17 | |
| Gary | Sutherlin | 2014–15 | 2017 AMA National Hare and Hound Champion 2017 WORCS Off-Road Champion |
| Jubal | Brown | 2015 | |
| Nicholas | Davis | 2015 | |
| Jason | Densley | 2015–16, 2018–19, 2021 | |
| Kale | Elworthy | 2015–16 | |
| Nate | Ferderer | 2015–16, 2019, 2021, 2023 | |
| Skyler | Howes | 2015 | |
| Layne | Michael | 2015–17, 2021–22 | 2019 World Trophy Winning Team Member 2021 AMA US ISDE Sprint Enduro Champion |
| Geofrey | Sanders | 2015 | |
| Dillon | Sheppard | 2015, 2017 | |
| Mickey | Silger | 2015 | |
| Josh | Toth | 2015–19, 2023–24 | 2017 AMA GNCC XC2 Champion 2016 Top US Club Team Rider 2023 Club Trophy Winning Team Member 2023 Club ISDE Overall Individual |
| Jamie | Wells | 2015 | |
| J.T. | Baker | 2016, 2018–19 | 2017 AMA WHS Pro 250 Champion 2018 ISDE C3 class winner |
| Dan | Caparelli | 2016 | |
| Joey | Fiasconaro | 2016 | |
| Tarah | Gieger | 2016, 2018–19 | 3 time AMA Amateur National Motocross Champion First Woman to compete at Motocross Des Nations 2019 Women's Trophy Winning team member |
| Broc | Hepler | 2016 | |
| Jason | Klammer | 2016 | |
| Luke | Ross | 2016 | |
| Talon | Soenksen | 2016, 2018, 2021 | |
| Rick | Emerson | 2017, 2023 | |
| Anthonee | Gibbs | 2017 | |
| Anson | Maloney | 2017, 2019, 2021–22, 2024 | 2018 AMA District 36 Champion |
| Kacy | Martinez | 2017 | 2nd 2017 ISDE Women's Trophy; 2009 AMA Women's Athlete of the Year; 2007–09 AMA National Hare Scramble Champion; 2009-11 WORCS Off-Road Champion; 2014 X-Games Gold Medalist; 2014-15 AMA GNCC Champion; 2016 AMA National Enduro Champion; 2017 AMA National Hare and Hound Champion; 2018 AMA EnduroCross Champion; 2018 AMA West Coast Grand Prix Champion |
| Steve | Mason | 2017 | |
| Van | McCarren | 2017 | |
| Justin | Morgan | 2017 | |
| Nick | O'Bryant | 2017–18 | |
| Brandy | Richards | 2017–19, 2021–24 | 2nd 2017–18 ISDE Women's Trophy - 3rd 2017, 2nd 2018 individually 2014, 2017, 2018 WORCS Women's Pro Champion; 2018, 2019 AMA National Hare and Hound Champion 2019 Women's Trophy winning team member 2021, 2023, 2024 Women's Trophy winning team member 2021, 2023, 2024 Women's Individual overall winner |
| Brendan | Riordan | 2017 | |
| Jacob | Rowland | 2017 | 2015 AMA 250 A National Enduro Champion |
| Rebecca | Sheets | 2017–19 | 2016 AMA GNCC Champion 2019 Women's Trophy Winning team member |
| Nick | Stover | 2017 | |
| Ty | Tremaine | 2017–18 | 3 time AMA Jr. Endurocross Champion; 2015 FIM World SuperEnduro Jr. Champion |
| Cody | Webb | 2017 | 2010 NATC/AMA Pro Trials Champion; 2014–15, 2017 AMA Endurocross Champion; 5 time Tennessee Knockout Winner |
| Trent | Whisenant | 2017–19 | |
| Alex | Witkowski | 2017 | |
| Cooper | Abbott | 2018 | |
| Zach | Bell | 2018 | 2017 AMA WCGP Champion |
| Adam | Froman | 2018 | Quarterback 2011 Atlanta Falcons |
| Jarred | Hall | 2018 | |
| James | King | 2018-19 | 2017 AMA 250 A National Enduro Champion |
| Drew | Lehr | 2018 | |
| Kendall | Norman | 2018 | 2 time AMA National Hare and Hound Champion 6 time Baja 1000 Winning Team Member |
| Dante | Oliveira | 2018-19, 2021–24 | 2019 Club Trophy Winning Team Member 2021, 2023 WORCS Champion 2022, 2023 AMA National Grand Prix Champion 2023 World Trophy Winning Team Member |
| Jared | Schlapia | 2018 | |
| Ryan | Smith | 2018 | |
| Tyler | Vore | 2018-19, 2021–22, 2024 | 2018 AMA Michigan Sprint Enduro Champion |
| Jacob | Argubright | 2019 | 2019 AMA National Hare and Hound Champion |
| Kevin | Dejongh | 2019 | |
| Nic | Garvin | 2019 | |
| Anthony | Krivi | 2019 | |
| Nathan | Rector | 2019, 2022 | |
| Ricky | Russell | 2019 | 2019 Club Trophy Winning Team Member |
| Austin | Serpa | 2019, 2023 | 2023 Club Trophy Winning Team Member |
| Blayne | Thompson | 2019 | |
| Austin | Walton | 2019, 2021–22 | 2019 Club Trophy Winning Team Member |
| Tanner | Whipple | 2019, 2021, 2024 | |
| Cody | Barnes | 2021-22, 2024 | |
| Preston | Campbell | 2021, 2023 | |
| Anthony | Ferrante | 2021-22, 2024 | |
| Brittney | Gallegos | 2021 | 2021 Women's Trophy Winning team member 2021 AMA National Hare and Hound Women's Champion |
| Jonathan | Girror | 2021, 2023–24 | 2020 AMA Full Gas Sprint Enduro Pro 2 Champion 2021 AMA US Sprint Enduro Pro 2 Champion 2021 AMA Grand National Cross Country XC2 Champion 2023 World Trophy Winning Team Member |
| Cade | Henderson | 2021, 2023 | |
| Kobe | Knight | 2021 | |
| Cole | Martinez | 2021, 2023 | 2021 AMA Grand Prix National Champion 2023 World Trophy Winning Team Member |
| Axel | Pearson | 2021, 2023 | |
| Travis | Reynaud | 2021-22 | |
| Nicholas | Swenson | 2021 | |
| Joel | Tonsgard | 2021 | |
| Kai | Aiello | 2022-23 | |
| Chase | Bright | 2022-23 | |
| Joshua | Chassaing | 2022 | |
| Jaden | Dahners | 2022, 2023–24 | 2023 C1 ISDE Champion |
| Craig | Delong | 2022 | 2023 AMA Grand National Cross Country Champion |
| David | Fullmer | 2022 | |
| Huck | Jenkins | 2022, 2024 | |
| Benjamin | Knight | 2022 | |
| Jonothan | McDougal | 2022 | |
| Mateo | Oliveira | 2022-24 | |
| Shane | Siebenthall | 2022 | |
| Gary | Smith | 2022 | |
| Kory | Steede | 2022-23 | 2023 Women's Trophy Winning Team Member |
| Nolan | Cate | 2023 | |
| Grant | Davis | 2023-24 | |
| Jackson | Davis | 2023 | |
| Thorn | Devlin | 2023 | |
| Trevor | Maley | 2023-24 | |
| Hunter | Smith | 2023-24 | |
| Ryan | Surratt | 2023 | 2023 Club Trophy Winning Team Member |
| Kyle | Tichenor | 2023 | |
| Zachary | Toth | 2023-24 | |
| Ava | Silvestri | 2023-24 | 2024 Women's Trophy Winning Team Member |
| Jahk | Walker | 2023-24 | |
| Jason | Tino | 2024 | |
| Layton | Smail | 2024 | |
| Cooper | Jones | 2024 | |
| Cole | Whitmer | 2024 | |
| Lane | Lorenzo | 2024 | |
| Ryder | Thomaselli | 2024 | |
| Eric | Forsberg | 2024 | |
| Eric | Stevenson | 2024 | |
| Olivia | Pugh | 2024 | 2024 Women's Club Winning Team Member |
| Jocleyn | Barnes | 2024 | 2024 Women's Club Winning Team Member |
| Rachel | Stout | 2024 | 2024 Women's Club Winning Team Member |

== Origin of 'Skunk Stripe' helmet ==
Every country participating in the International Six Days is designated by the colors adorned on their helmets. Since the first official US Team the colors were blue with white stripes. The origin of the design is not clear.

Starting in 1951 the Cunningham racing team added racing stripes to their cars to easily identify them during the a racing. These evolved from the traditional FIA (Fédération Internationale de l'Automobile) registered US Racing colors of a white body and blue chassis which dated from when racing cars had the chassis exposed. The two blue stripes were a symbolic echo of the chassis colors. In 1959 the FIA instructed drivers to add a country color to their helmets similar to British Racing green. Dan Gurney of Ferrari decided to run a blue helmet with a white stripe. He only ran the helmet for 2 years as he felt it was bad luck with a string of sub par finishes.

In 1964 the first official US ISDT Team was organized and Bell helmets supplied the team. The helmets that they supplied were blue with 3 white stripes on them. Later Bell became the official helmet supplier for the team and the "Skunk Stripe" was further developed and stuck as the designation of the US ISDE Team. While the "Skunk Stripes" have evolved slightly and Arai is now the official Helmet provider of the US ISDE Team, with Tagger being the official US ISDE Trophy team painter, the blue and white still holds a special spot in the hearts of all of the riders on this list below.

== See also ==
- Origin of the Racing Stripe – Racing stripe
- AMA National Motocross Championships – AMA Motocross Championship
- AMA Supercross Championships – AMA Supercross Championship
- Baja 1000 Wins – Baja 1000
