= Penton =

Motorcycle brand, 1968-1978

- Industry: Off-road motorcycles
- Founded: 1968
- Founder: John Penton
- Parent: KTM Austria

Penton was a rebadged American brand of off-road enduro motorcycles designed by John Penton and manufactured by KTM in Austria for distribution in the United States between 1968 and 1978.

== History ==
=== Origins ===
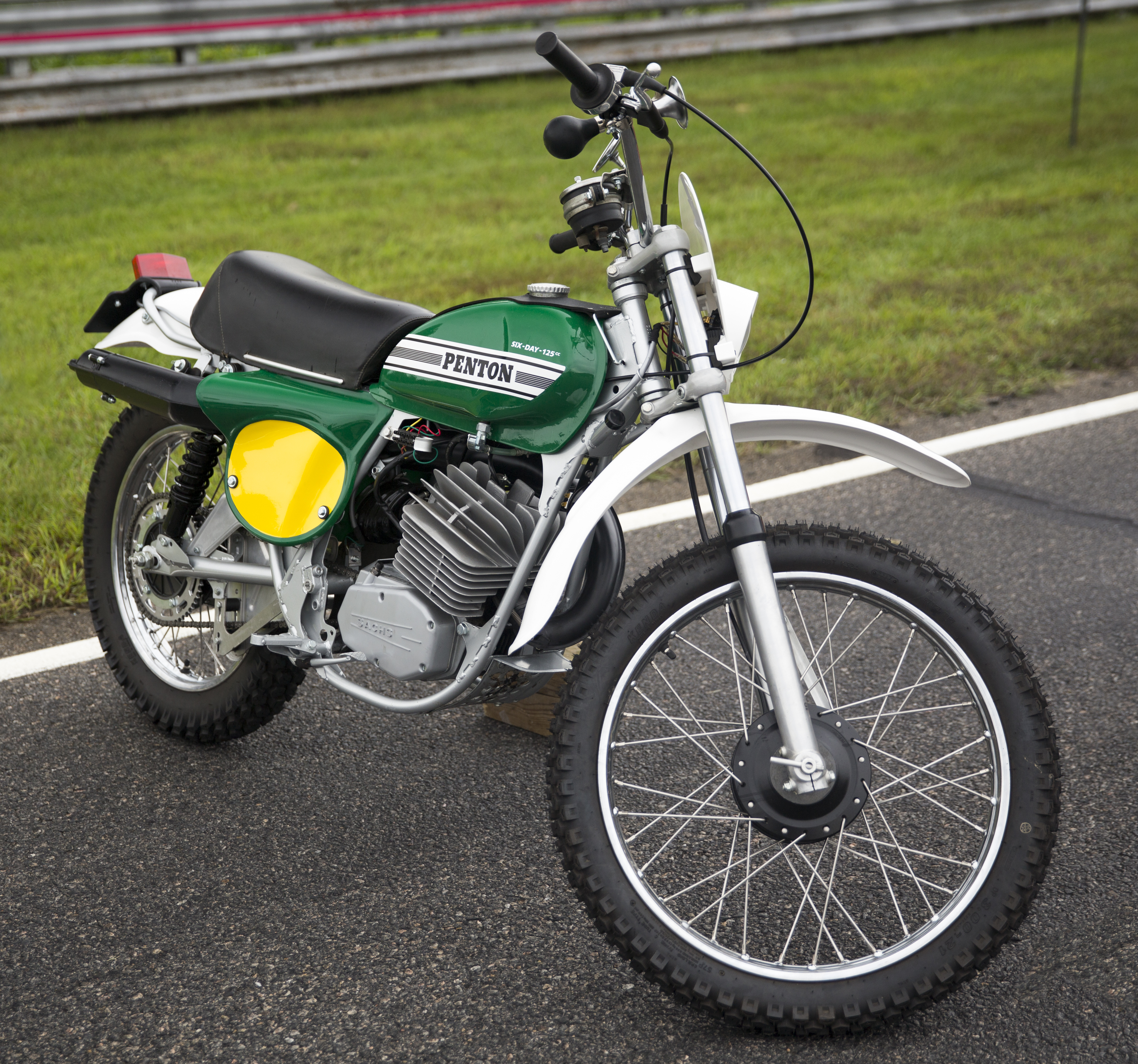
1974 Penton 125 Six Day

John Penton was an accomplished American off-road motorcycle racer. In 1950, Penton and his brothers opened a motorcycle dealership in Amherst, Ohio, where they sold BSA as well as BMW and NSU motorcycles. Penton became one of the top motorcycle enduro competitors in the nation, representing the United States seven times at the International Six Days Trial (now called International Six Days Enduro) between 1962 and 1970. The International Six Days Trial is a form of off-road motorcycle Olympics which is the oldest annual competition sanctioned by the FIM dating back to 1913.

After winning the 1966 Jack Pine Enduro on a Husqvarna, the Swedish motorcycle manufacturer named him the distributor of the brand for the eastern United States. As the baby boomer generation came of age during the 1960s and 1970s, off-road motorcycling experienced a boom in popularity. Penton sought to capitalize on this boom by providing a lightweight off-road motorcycle. After failing to convince Husqvarna to produce an even lighter off-road machine, he decided to make his proposal to the KTM factory in Austria which, at the time produced bicycles and mopeds.

Penton offered to put up $6,000 of his own money if KTM would build prototypes to his specifications which, would be sold in the United States as Penton motorcycles. The first Penton motorcycles were produced in 1968 and used a modified small-capacity Sachs engine with improved suspension and details. He formed a successful racing team that supported some of the top enduro racers of the era including his son, Jack Penton who competed in 12 ISDT events as well as Dick Burleson, Carl Cranke and Billy Uhl.

=== Models ===
The early motorcycles made their mark in International Six Days Trials competitions, enduro races like the Michigan Jack Pine Endurance Run, scrambles and motocross. The most popular size was the 125cc (Six Day), but they were also made in 100 cc (Berkshire) and later, in 175 cc (Jackpiner, in 1972), 250 cc (Hare Scrambler, in 1973), and 400 cc (Mint, in 1974).

Beginning in 1972 fiberglass gas tanks were introduced and all of the 175 cc and larger models used KTM engines. In 1974 longer travel gas forks with laid-down rear shocks for longer suspension travel, lightweight plastic fenders and frames of high grade chrome-molybdenum steel were introduced. In 1976 two distinct models appeared for the first time differentiating between Motocross use (MC5) and Enduro (Cross County). The MC5 MX series used longer travel leading-axle, magnesium slider forks to complement the high lever-ratio rear suspension configuration making all but the 125 a competitive Motocross model.

Other, less-common models included the Mudlark observed trials motorcycle (made by Wassell in England), the Cafe MX (a dual purpose version of the Mudlark), the Hiro 125 (the Six Day with an Italian motor), the Woodsman (an enduro version of the Mudlark) and the K-R (Kenny Roberts) short-track racer.

=== KTM buyout ===
Production, development and distribution was taken over completely by KTM Austria in 1978. By the time Penton sold the distributorship to KTM in 1978, more than 25,000 Penton motorcycles had been sold in America. John Penton was inducted into the AMA Motorcycle Hall of Fame in 1998.

The 1997 KTM Jackpiner 200 LE was a limited production run of the first 200 cc KTM enduro motorcycle. It was built to celebrate the 30th anniversary of the first Penton KTM motorcycle. It came with Penton blue plastics and John Penton's signature on a sticker attached to the front fender.
