= KTM 300 =

Series of off-road motorcycles made by KTM

KTM 300 XC
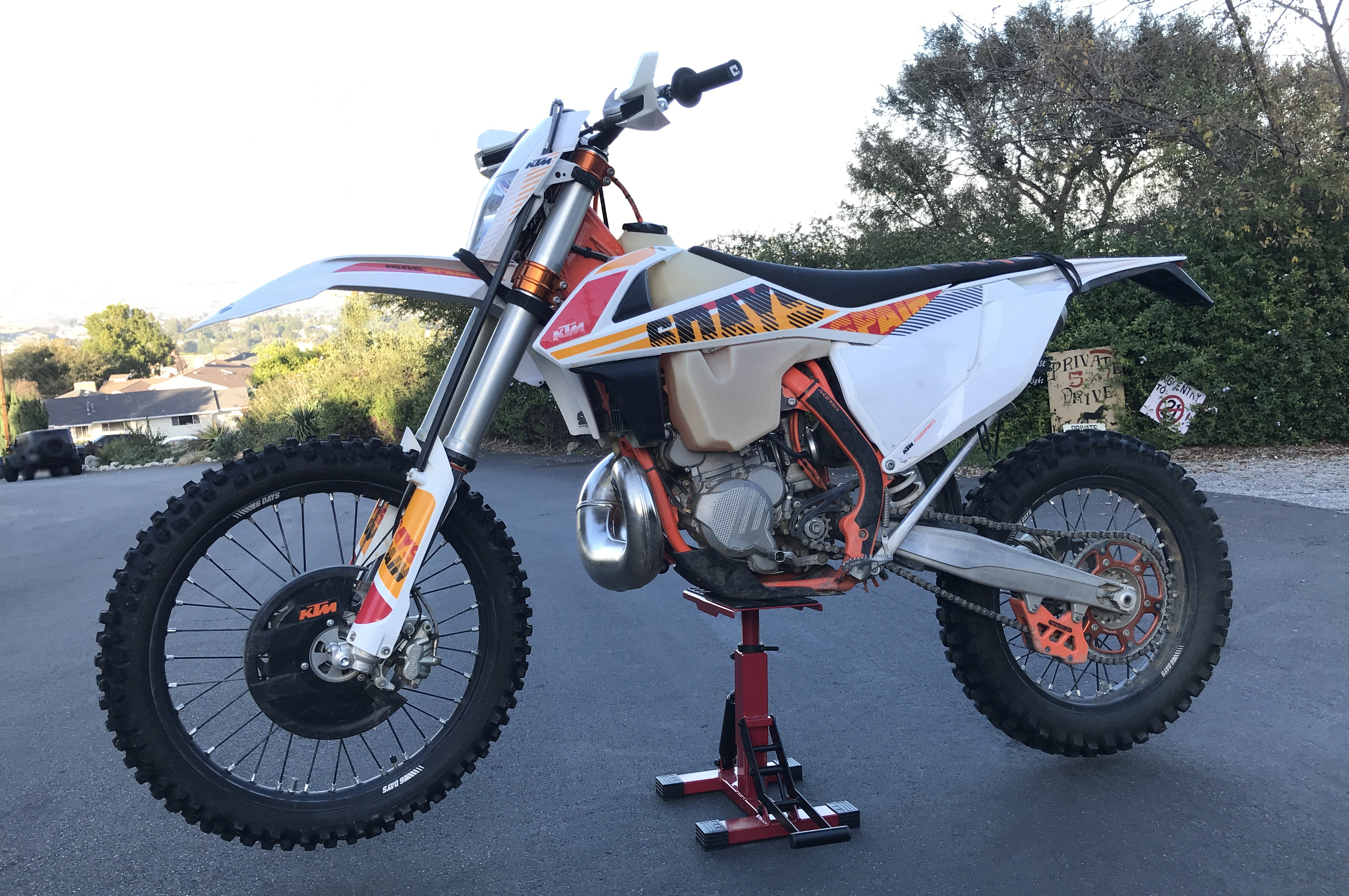
- KTM 300 XC-W Six-Days Spain Edition
- Manufacturer: KTM-Sportmotorcycle AG
- Also called: KTM 300EXC, KTM 300XC-W, KTM 300SX
- Production: 1984-present
- Predecessor: KTM 300 GS
- Class: Enduro
- Engine: 293 cc (17.88 cu in) Single-cylinder, liquid-cooled, Reed intake, Fuel injected, 2-stroke
- Bore / stroke: 72 mm / 72 mm
- Compression ratio: 13.2:1
- Top speed: 85 mph
- Power: 47–55 hp (35–41 kW)
- Ignition type: Vitesco Technologies EMS
- Transmission: 5 or 6-speed, wet clutch, chain drive
- Frame type: Central double-cradle-type 25CrMo4 steel
- Suspension: Front: WP USD 48mm; fully adjustable Rear: WP single shock; fully adjustable
- Brakes: Hydraulic single disc Front :260mm (10.24") Rear: 220mm (8.66")
- Tires: 90/90-21"; 140/80-18"; 80/100-21"; 110/100-19"
- Rake, trail: 26.5°, 4.4 in (110 mm)
- Wheelbase: 58.6–58.8 in (1,490–1,490 mm)
- Seat height: 37.6 to 37.9 in (960 to 960 mm)
- Weight: 219.0 to 231 lb (99.3 to 104.8 kg) (dry)
- Fuel capacity: 2.64–3.04 US gal (10.0–11.5 L; 2.20–2.53 imp gal)
- Oil capacity: 0.7 liters / 0.74 qt.
- Related: KTM 200 EXC, KTM 250 EXC, Husaberg/Husqvarna TE 300

The KTM 300 is a series of 2-stroke enduro / off-road motorcycles made by KTM. They are the Penton-inspired 1984 300 GS, the 300 DMX, the dirt only 300 MXC, European road legal 300 EXC and the US 300 XC (close-ratio), 300 XC-W (wide-ratio gear box) and 300 SX (Motocross) versions. The KTM 300 is designed for difficult off-road conditions. The 300 EXC and the 300 XC-W have a small headlight, speedometer, tail-light and somewhat softer linkless PDS (Note: PDS is an initialism for Progressive Damping System when referring to rear shock absorbers in non-linkage rear suspensions.") suspension. Starting in 2008 all 300's came with electric start. Since the early 2000s KTM has been offering the XC-W model in a special premium limited edition with many upgraded components.

== KTM 300 Notable Changes ==
2008	Electric start
2011	6-Speed transmission
2017	Counter balancer added, Mikuni TMX38 Carb, New air box/filter
2018	Transfer Port Injection added to 300 for Euro bikes only. 250 XC-W TPI offered in the U.S. 1st year of the ERZBERGRODEO edition.
2019	TPI only for 300 XC-W
2020	TPI all models, Improved ignition mapping, re-designed plastics.
2021	Pleated/ribbed expansion chamber, new piston, new throttle assembly.
2022	Nitrated steel liners in the clutch for improved life and better heat resistance.
2023	The 300SX is added to the product line.
2024	TBI all models, electronic power valve, reverted to non-pleated pipes.

== Model progression ==
=== 1984–1989 ===
The original 300GS Enduro grew out of the experience with 250 cc Penton Hare Scrambler and other KTM air cooled 2-stroke enduro bikes. Since the 1986 rules for the International Six Days Enduro (ISDE) for the open class allowed any bike larger than 250 cc, KTM experimented with a water cooled over-250 cc bike for the open class. They essentially bored their 250 out to 273 cc and called it a 300. This version of the 300 was discontinued in 1987. KTM also tried sleeving down their 500mxc two-stroke to 350 cc calling it the 350mxc, but the left side kick-starter and the right side chain were not popular.

=== 1990–1997 ===
In 1990 KTM got serious and the present-day 300 was born. Dubbed the 300 EXC, its engine delivered very smooth power and did not produce a power hit. The bike performed well at low RPMs. In the mid-range and the top-end the smooth power delivery allowed the rider control over a wide variety of riding conditions from tight trails to wide open stretches. The plush suspension worked well compared to the older GS models.

The bike was also offered as the 300 D/XC, a California desert version and as an MX. These early KTM motors had 297 cc displacement with 73 mm x 72 mm bore/stroke. Still the 300 hadn't reached its full potential. Ignition and jetting problems plagued these early models. In 1992 the company suffered financial woes and development was slowed. The 1993 KTMs had Öhlins USD (Note: USD is an initialism for UpSide Down when referring to telescopic forks on modern motorcycles.") forks. WP forks were also used that year. In 1993 Motoplat went out of business, forcing KTM to switch to SEM ignition systems. The 1996 model had Marzocchi USD forks and an Öhlins rear shock absorber, a chrome exhaust pipe and silencer, a motor with better performance, increased cooling and stock Boyesen reeds. For 1996–97 the bike was offered in a 360 cc version. In 1997 KTM switched to Kokusan ignition systems.

=== 1998–2003 ===
1996 was the first year for the KTM trademark orange bikes. In addition to larger capacity radiators, the 300 received KTM's PDS link-less rear suspension with 320 mm of rear wheel travel. The bike was again offered in a bored out 380 cc version during 1998-2000 (a street legal title was offered in some states). In 1999 the 300 received a hydraulic clutch and the 2000 motor benefited from a redesigned cylinder.

=== 2004–2007 ===
In 2004 there was another frame change. There were significant engine changes, including a bore and stroke change and the carburetor size reduced from 38 mm to 36 mm, resulting in an 8 lb (3.6 kg) weight savings and no more jetting problems. For 2006, the US version of the 300 EXC was replaced by the XC and the XC-W. Both versions had 5-speed gearboxes and a stator for producing electricity. The 300 XC had a close-ratio gear box, no wiring for lights, and a stiffer suspension. The 300 XC-W had a wide-ratio gear box, head light, tail light and maintained the softer PDS suspension. The 2007 model had added a dual ignition mapping switch on the handlebar.

=== 2008–2016 ===
The 2008 KTM 300 EXC is the first electric start two-stroke enduro bike to be released by a major manufacturer. All models have PDS rear suspension.

For 2010, Husaberg, the other KTM owned bike company, offered the TE300, an XC-W with minor modifications to the bodywork and suspension settings.

In 2011, models received 6-speed gearboxes, a new exhaust pipe and silencer, and translucent fuel tanks. The XC was also upgraded to a new frame, while retaining PDS rear suspension. These frame updates did not make it to the XC-W until 2012. The 2011 Husaberg TE 300 was essentially a rebadged KTM 300 and was available through 2012.

In 2012 there were improvements to the starter motor bendix, more frame changes resulting in more wheel travel for models with PDS rear suspension (except the XC), and a new air box with a filter that can be replaced without the use of tools. The 300XC was changed from PDS rear suspension to linkage rear suspension. The 300XC-W models received the frame and bodywork updates that arrived in the XC line the year before, but also retain PDS rear suspension.

In 2013 the clutch was changed to a 'DDS' diaphragm spring clutch with lighter pull, a new stronger starter motor (350W motor was replaced with a 410W motor), lighter battery, and triple clamps changed from 22 mm to 20 mm offset. The Husaberg TE300 was rebranded the Husqvarna TE300 and also received linkage rear suspension.

In 2014 bikes received a new CDI unit and ignition curve, stronger/larger battery, changed jetting, updated brakes (front master cylinder, caliper, and pads changed), a redesigned cylinder head, new Boyesen reeds, stiffer seat foam, and a new rear shock absorber with revised settings.

The 2015 model chromoly steel frame is painted orange like the motocross models. All the 2015 models have the new WP 4CS forks with revised damping (rebound in one fork and compression in the other) with the ability to make adjustments on the fly, and a smaller front axle. The triple clamps have 2 mm less offset resulting in more trail and different steering characteristics. The rear shock is longer but the travel is unchanged. The electric starter has different gearing to provide higher initial torque from the electric motor, and the battery is lighter and stronger.

MY 2016 300s retain the same chassis and engine specification as MY 2015.

=== 2017–2022 ===
The 2017 KTM 300's are completely redesigned bikes with new engines. A lateral counter-balancer has been added to greatly reduce motor vibration. The cases are a new design featuring a new position for the starter motor. A Mikuni TMX38 carb replaced the Keihin PWK carburetor as Keihin focuses on fuel injection. There was a change to the air filter design. Suspension changed with the addition of a new Xplor 48 front and rear shock, which was downsized from 50 mm to 46 mm. The forks are similar to the previous generation open cartridge forks supplied on the 300's with split compression and rebound adjustment on separate fork legs. The knob on top of the left fork controls compression and the knob on the top of the right fork controls rebound, similar to the 4CS fork system (However, the internals are otherwise quite different than 4CS).

For 2018 KTM started offering the 300 EXC (Europe only) model with transfer port injection (TPI) and with oil injection through the 39 mm Dell’Orto throttle body to meet EURO 4 standards. In the U.S., the 2018 XC-W was offered in a TPI alongside the existing Mikuni version.

For 2019 KTM began offering U.S. customers the 300 XC-W model with (TPI) and oil injection. The fuel injected 300's were previously available only in the international market. The KTM XC-W still comes with PDS rear suspension while the 300 XC and the Husqvarna TC300 (essentially a KTM XC with different plastics and subframe) and the TE300 come with linkage rear suspension.

For the 2020 model year KTM began providing U.S. customers both the 300 XC-W and 300 XC with TPI and throttle body oil injection, thus eliminating all carbureted 300's from the US market. Both models benefit from updated EFI mapping and a new added air pressure sensor. The XC-W was given an all new chassis positioning the motor one degree downward for better front end handling. Minor changes include: An updated ECU, suspension settings and styling / plastic upgrades.

For 2021 there was little change. The GasGas EC and EX models incorporated TPI features of each the KTM and Husqvarna 300's. The expansion chamber design was updated using a new manufacturing process to produce a ribbed stamped design that reduces noise and increases strength and impact resistance. The shape is also adjusted for improved ground clearance. The silencer was also updated to a new design that is more compact and has an integrated aluminum mounting bracket. On a side note the 2021s were the last KTM 2-strokes eligible for a California red/green sticker.

In November 2020 KTM released new '102' ECU maps that improve fueling and responsiveness, and an optional '103 Extreme Mapping' for 2020-2021 250/300 TPI bikes that adjust fueling and increase oiling.

=== 2023–Present ===
In 2023 KTM introduced an all new motor for the 300XC and 300SX lines. The new motor employs Throttle Body Injection in place of the previous Transfer Port Injection as well as an electronic power valve in place of the mechanical one. The new XC and SX bikes do away with the oil pump and oil reservoir requiring the use of pre-mix gas. The kick starter option has been eliminated, electric start only. The 2023 300XC-W maintained the previous engine design with TPI and the kick start option.

For 2024 KTM completed the transition from TPI to TBI on all versions of the 300. The 2024 300XC-W retains the oil pump and oil tank making it easy to fill-up with pump gas. KTM also reverted to the standard (non-pleated) pipes.

Each year KTM offers one or more premium versions of the 300 XC-W. In 2023 it was the "Erzbergrodeo" edition, for 2024 it was called the "HardEnduro", in 2025 it is the "Factory Edition".

== See also ==
- KTM 200
