= John Penton (motorcyclist) =

American motorcycle racer (1925–2025)

- Born: August 19, 1925; Amherst, Ohio, U.S.
- Died: September 7, 2025 (aged 100); Amherst, Ohio, U.S.
- Occupations: Motorcycle racer, businessman, entrepreneur
- Years active: 1948–c. 1988
- Known for: Developing Penton motorcycles, off-road motorcycle racing, founding Penton boot and apparel company
- Spouses: Katherine Marks (m. 1949; died 1958); Donna Thompson (m. 1960; died 2017)
- Children: 3

John Alfred Penton (August 19, 1925 – September 7, 2025) was an American professional motorcycle racer and businessman who developed an enduro motorcycle brand that bore his name. A national champion enduro rider, he was an influential figure in the development of off-road motorcycle racing in the United States during the 1960s and 1970s. He also founded a successful off-road motorcycle boot and apparel company.

Penton was inducted into the AMA Motorcycle Hall of Fame in 1998.

== Early life ==
John Alfred Penton was born on August 19, 1925. A lifelong resident of the Amherst, Ohio, area, he grew up on his family's farm there, where he learned how to ride a motorcycle on his father's 1914 Harley-Davidson. He served in the Merchant Marine and in the Navy during the Second World War then, returned home and soon bought a Harley-Davidson Knucklehead motorcycle.

== Motorcycling career ==
Penton entered the grueling Jack Pine 500-Mile Enduro in 1948 where, he was impressed by the performance of the BSA motorcycle ridden by the race winner. The advantage that the nimble, lightweight British motorcycle had over heavier, more powerful motorcycles left an impression on Penton. He rode a BSA B33 to a second-place finish in the 1949 Jack Pine Enduro. The second-place finish inspired Penton to find a better performing enduro motorcycle.

In 1950, Penton and his brothers opened a motorcycle dealership in Amherst where, they sold BSA as well as BMW and NSU motorcycles. Penton became one of the top motorcycle enduro competitors in the nation, representing the United States seven times at the International Six Days Trial (now called International Six Days Enduro) between 1962 and 1970. The International Six Days Trial is a form of off-road motorcycle Olympics which is the oldest annual competition sanctioned by the FIM dating back to 1913. He was also a long-distance motorcyclist, setting a transcontinental crossing record when he rode a BMW R69S from New York to Los Angeles in 52 hours and 11 minutes, from June 8–10, 1959.

After Penton won the 1966 Jack Pine Enduro on a Husqvarna, the Swedish motorcycle manufacturer named him the distributor of the brand for the eastern United States. As the baby boomer generation came of age during the 1960s and 1970s, off-road motorcycling experienced a boom in popularity. Penton sought to capitalize on this boom by providing a lightweight off-road motorcycle. After failing to convince Husqvarna to produce an even lighter off-road machine, he decided to make his proposal to the KTM factory in Austria which, at the time produced bicycles and mopeds.

Penton offered to put up $6,000 of his own money if KTM would build prototypes to his specifications which, then would be sold in the United States as Penton motorcycles. He formed a successful racing team that supported some of the top enduro racers of the era including his son, Jack Penton, who competed in 12 ISDT events as well as Dick Burleson, Carl Cranke and Billy Uhl. By the time Penton sold the distributorship to KTM, approximately ten years later, more than 25,000 Penton motorcycles had been sold in the United States.

Penton's innovations also included off-road motorcycling apparel. With the assistance of Italian boot manufacturer Alpinestars, he developed one of the biggest-selling off-road motorcycle boots in the nation. Top motocross racer Bob Hannah wore the boots and consulted on improvements to the design. By the late-1970s, his boot and apparel company accounted for over half the sales in the American market. He turned over control of the company to a friend, Mark Rathburn, in the early 1980s, and the company was sold in 1988.

== Recognition ==
Penton was inducted to the Motorcycle Hall of Fame in 1998. A book, John Penton and the Off-Road Motorcycle Revolution, and a 2014 video documentary about Penton's life, Penton: The John Penton Story, narrated by Lyle Lovett, have been created.

== Personal life and death ==
In 1949, Penton married Katherine Marks, with whom he had three sons. She died from multiple sclerosis in 1958. He began racing much more in the aftermath of his wife's death, and it preceded his record-breaking transcontinental crossing in 1959. In 1960, he married Donna Thompson; they were married until her death in 2017.

Penton's sons Jeff, Jack, and Tom also competed in off-road bike racing. Jack was a multi-time ISDE winner who was inducted into the AMA Hall of Fame in 2009.

Nineteen days after turning 100, Penton died at a care facility in Amherst, Ohio, on September 7, 2025.
