= KTM 200 =

KTM 200 EXC / XC-W
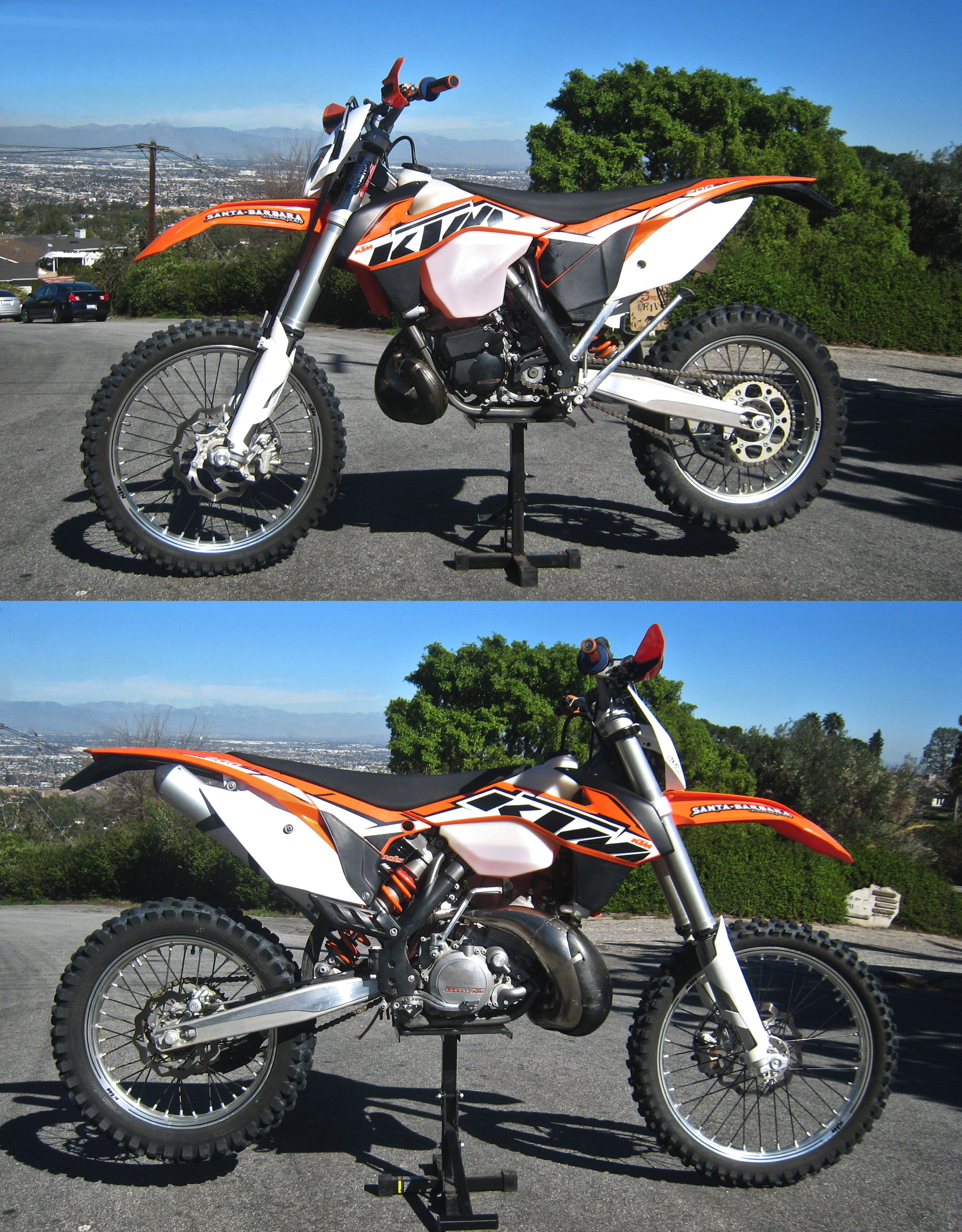
- Manufacturer: KTM-Sportmotorcycle AG
- Parent company: KTM AG
- Production: 2000-2016
- Predecessor: KTM JackPiner 200 LE, KTM 200 MXC
- Successor: KTM 150 XC-W
- Class: Enduro
- Engine: 193 cc (11.78 cu in) Single-cylinder, liquid-cooled, Reed intake, 2-stroke
- Bore / stroke: 64.0mm x 60.0 mm
- Compression ratio: 14.5:1
- Power: 40 hp (30 kW)
- Torque: 22 ft/lb (15 m/kg) @ 8000 rpm
- Ignition type: Kokusan contactless, electronic, digital ignition timing adjustment
- Transmission: 6-speed
- Frame type: Central double-cradle-type 25CrMo4 steel
- Suspension: Front: WP USD 48mm x 300 mm (12 in) travel; fully adjustable Rear: WP single shock; 330 mm (13 in) wheel travel; fully adjustable
- Brakes: Hydraulic single disc Front :400mm (10.24") Rear: 375mm (8.66")
- Tires: 90/90-21"; 110/100-18"
- Rake, trail: 26.5°, 4.4 in (110 mm)
- Wheelbase: 57.91 in (1,471 mm)
- Seat height: 37.79 in (960 mm)
- Weight: 99.5 kg (219 lb) (dry)
- Fuel capacity: 2.64 US gal (10.0 L; 2.20 imp gal)
- Related: KTM 300 XC-W, KTM 250 XC-W
- Ground clearance: 13.98 in (355 mm)

The KTM 200 consists of a series of two-stroke off-road enduro motorcycles made by KTM, the European, road legal 200 EXC, 200 MXC and the 200 XC-W for the US market being the last versions. The 200 attempts to combine the agility of a 125 cc class motorcycle with the power of a 250 cc. As a small bore enduro bike it is equipped with a wide-ratio gear box. Starting in 2013 all 200's came with electric start.

== Model progression ==
=== 1997–1999 ===
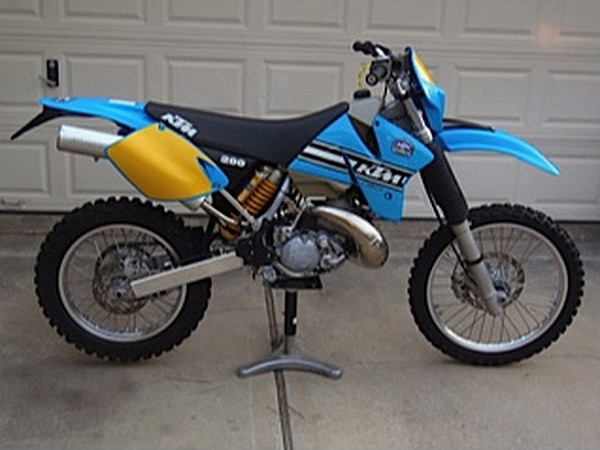
1997 KTM Jackpiner 200 LE

A man kick-starts a KTM 200

The 1997 KTM Jackpiner 200 LE was a, 133 unit, limited production run of the first 200 cc KTM. It was built to commemorate the 30th anniversary of the first Penton KTM motorcycle. It was inspired by the 175 cc Penton Jackpiner, named for the Michigan Jack Pine Endurance Run. It came with Penton blue plastics and a sticker attached to the front fender bearing John Penton's signature. It was outfitted with Öhlins Forks and was the first bike with PDS (Note: PDS is an initialism for Progressive Damping System when referring to rear shock absorbers in non-linkage rear suspensions.") no-linkage rear suspension developed by Öhlins, and was also one of the first bikes to incorporate a hydraulic clutch. A year later the first production KTM 200 MXC was fitted with Marzocchi 45 forks and the trademark orange plastics.

=== 2000–2002 ===
The 2000 EXC was upgraded to 43 mm inverted forks with 295 mm of wheel travel. The White Power rear shock and PDS non-linkage suspension combine to provide 300 mm of wheel travel. The 2001 model started to appear with semi-clear fuel tanks, however well into 2002 some continued to be delivered with orange tanks.

=== 2003 - 2007 ===
The 2003 year model 200s were upgraded with White Power USD (Note: USD is an initialism for UpSide Down when referring to telescopic forks on modern motorcycles.") 43 mm forks increasing wheel travel to 300 mm. Rear wheel travel was also increased to 325 mm. The front axle was enlarged to 26 mm and hubs increased in diameter from 36 to 52 mm front and from 48 to 64 mm rear.

The 2004 got a new tank, seat and air box and the new one piece rear fender.

In 2005, the seat height was 925 mm and the handlebars were supplied by Renthal. The hydraulic clutch was fitted with a flexible steel hose. A Trip Master digital speedometer was added. The transmission was given a new, wider, more load-resistant 2nd gear and smoother shifting overall. The motor was given a new crank shaft, reconfigured transfer ports and the paper head gasket was replaced with a silicone o-ring.

In 2006, the US version of the 200 EXC was rebranded the 200 XC-W.

For 2007, the carburetor was changed from 38 to 36 mm and had some internal changes to the suspension. The cdi went to dual position, race & rain mode.

=== 2008 - 2011 ===
The 2008 200s changed from the 200 frame to a bigger frame similar to the 250, swing-arm and shock based on the 250SXF motocrosser and its own new sub-frame. The bike is a featherweight which greatly affects its handling.

=== 2012–2016 ===
The 2012 200s received a completely revamped frame, a new, lighter, cast aluminum swing arm, a new 7 mm longer PDS rear shock with adjustable rebound and compression settings, the latest WP forks with a wider adjustment range and new settings. The wheels came with CNC-machined hubs, Excel brand rims, zinc/nickel-coated spokes and aluminum spoke nipples. The new bodywork had a slimmer seat, a longer rear fender and a translucent fuel tank. There was a newly redesigned kick-starter. A redesigned air box and filter that can be replaced without the use of tools and a flow-optimised intake flange was between the airbox and the carburetor.

The 2013 200s gained electric start.

In 2014, the battery and starter were improved. The bike received more resilient seat foam, a new front fender, an altered bottom triple-clamp, a better headlight (using a common H4 bulb) and new handguards. The bike retained the older spring-type clutch providing a lighter lever action than other KTMs. The 2014 was provided with a new master cylinder/reservoir with a smaller diameter piston and new lever for a lighter pull.

The 2015 200s received KTM orange paint for the frame, Neken handlebars, black anodized rims, a new MAE speedometer and a new, lighter 3Ah battery.

The 2016 front axle was reduced from 26 mm to 22 mm to reduce weight. The bike got another change to the frame, a new skid plate, orange anodized rear sprocket, more orange plastics and a new seat cover.

The KTM 200 was discontinued for the 2017 model year. The replacement in the lineup is considered to be the 143.99 cc KTM 150 XC-W.
