= Mike Lafferty =

Mike Lafferty may refer to:

- Mike Lafferty (motorcyclist) (born 1975), American Enduro racer
- Mike Lafferty (alpine skier) (born 1948), American former alpine skier
