= Mike Lafferty (motorcyclist) =

American motorcycle racer

Mike Lafferty (born October 25, 1975) is an American former motorcycle enduro competitor. He is a multi-time AMA National Enduro Champion. He has been racing at the championship level since 1993 when he won the AMA Regional Championship. Lafferty has won eight AMA National Enduro Championships, which ties the record previously set by Dick Burleson. He has 69 National wins.

Born in Port Elizabeth, New Jersey, Lafferty has been factory sponsored by manufacturers such as KTM USA, part of KTM, an international manufacturer of on and off-road sporting motorcycles. In 2009, Husaberg North America, a division of KTM Motorsports, Inc. signed Mike to the Husaberg Factory Race Team for the remainder of the 2009 and 2010 season.

Lafferty's father, Jack, is also known within the sport as a very competitive senior class rider, and for being largely responsible for his son's success since a young age. At regional enduro events, Jack is recognized for his physical longevity and riding skill, both of which he has managed to maintain in spite of his advanced age. He consistently outpaces many younger, healthier riders.

In the US Enduro community, the Lafferty name has become synonymous with the sport. Mike Lafferty in particular, is a well-known figure, respected by the community's constituents. In addition to his factory sponsorships, Lafferty receives product sponsorships from various motorcycle product manufacturers (primarily in an off-road context, but also from manufacturers who make products for on and off-road riding such as tire and clothing manufacturers, or products such as race-fuels and other fluids).

Enduro receives limited press coverage and has a relatively small fan base outside the riders and their families. As a result, the sport offers fewer prize-money and advertising opportunities than more widely covered motorsports. Factory sponsorships in Enduro generally do not include contracts comparable to those offered to factory riders in sports such as Supercross. However, some successful Enduro riders have been able to earn a living through racing. Lafferty is among them.

== 2009 - 2010 Rekluse/AMA National Enduro Series results ==
Lafferty gave Husaberg their first-ever national enduro win with a come-from-behind victory at the 60th running of the Alligator Enduro in Daytona Beach, Florida – round three of the Rekluse/AMA National Enduro Series. He finished third in Tennessee, third in Texas, and third in Georgia.
