= Carl Cranke =

American motorcycle racer (1948–2020)

- Nationality: American
- Born: September 24, 1948
- Died: November 14, 2020 (aged 72) Vancouver, Washington

Motocross career
- Years active: 1968–1981
- Teams: Penton, KTM, Yamaha
- Wins: 7 x ISDT Gold Medalist 2 x ISDT Silver Medalist

Carl Lee Cranke (September 24, 1948 – November 14, 2020) was an American professional motorcycle enduro competitor. He represented the United States in ten International Six Days Trial (ISDT) in the 1960s and 1970s. He earned seven gold medals and two silver medals in ISDT competitions to become one of the most accomplished American enduro riders of his era. Cranke was also notable for his two stroke engine tuning abilities, and was also credited with helping develop Penton motorcycles. He was inducted into the AMA Motorcycle Hall of Fame in 2000.

== Motorcycle racing career ==
Cranke grew up in Northern California, near Sacramento where he attended Bella Vista High School in Fair Oaks, California. He began racing a 50cc Suzuki in local dirt track races with sponsorship from a local motorcycle shop when he was 16 years old. He also began racing in scrambles racing which was the forerunner to the sport of motocross. Cranke became a professional dirt track racer when he turned 18, competing against future dirt track national champions Mert Lawwill and Dick Mann. In 1968, he was the top ranked novice dirt track racer in the nation.

When dirt track racing became too expensive for him, Cranke began competing in Hare scrambles and Hare and Hound races. He also began competing in motocross racing against northern California racers such as future world champion Brad Lackey. Cranke also became recognized for his exceptional ability to extract horsepower from two stroke engines, helping Lackey's early national championship career with his tuning abilities.

After Cranke defeated Swedish rider Lars Larsson in the support race at a Trans-AMA motocross event in Gilroy, California, he was contracted to race for the Penton racing team. Pentons were off-road competition motorcycles primarily designed and sold in the United States by John Penton. Initial frame manufacturing and assembly were done by the KTM factory of Austria, which eventually took over all production and distribution in the United States.

Cranke qualified to become a member of the U.S. ISDT Team representing the United States at the 1972 International Six Days Trial in Czechoslovakia. The International Six Days Trial, now known as the International Six Days Enduro, is a form of off-road motorcycle Olympics which is the oldest annual competition sanctioned by the FIM dating back to 1913. He earned a Gold Medal that year in Czechoslovakia and, went on to represent the United States in ten International Six Days Trials events while competing aboard Penton, KTM and Yamaha motorcycles. He earned a total of seven gold medals and two silver medals in ISDT competition. Cranke ended his professional racing career after the 1981 season.

Later in life, Cranke lived in Battle Ground, Washington. He was inducted into the AMA Motorcycle Hall of Fame in 2000. At the age of 72, he died from cancer in Vancouver, Washington on November 14, 2020.
