= Adam Froman =

American football player (born 1987)

No. 5
- Position: Quarterback

Personal information
- Born: December 18, 1987 (age 38); Santa Rosa, California, U.S.
- Listed height: 6 ft 4 in (1.93 m)
- Listed weight: 220 lb (100 kg)

Career information
- High school: Maria Carrillo (Santa Rosa)
- College: Louisville
- NFL draft: 2011: undrafted

Career history

Playing
- Atlanta Falcons (2011)*; Winnipeg Blue Bombers (2011)*; Spokane Shock (2012)
- * Offseason or practice squad member only

Coaching
- LSU (2012) (Asst); Valdosta State (2013–2014) (QB)

Career AFL statistics
- Comp. / Att.: 48 / 69
- Passing yards: 459
- TD–INT: 8–6
- QB rating: 80.53
- Rushing TDs: 4
- Stats at ArenaFan.com
- Stats at Pro Football Reference

Adam Froman (born December 18, 1987) is an American former football quarterback. He played college football for the Louisville Cardinals, and signed with the Atlanta Falcons as an undrafted free agent. Froman was also a member of the Winnipeg Blue Bombers of the Canadian Football League (CFL) and the Spokane Shock of the Arena Football League (AFL).

== Early life ==
Froman played high school football at Maria Carrillo High School in Santa Rosa, California. He threw for 1,944 yards as a senior and also recorded 20 touchdown passes.

== College career ==
Froman first played college football for the Santa Rosa Bear Cubs of Santa Rosa Junior College. He helped the Bear Cubs to an 8–3 season in 2008, including a 28–20 win over No. 2-ranked Sierra College in the West Bank Bowl. He threw for 525 yards on 35 of 61 passing with three touchdowns in a win over Sierra and was named the game's Most Valuable Player. Froman tied the school record with seven touchdown passes in his third college start. He threw for a state-leading 3,876 yards and 40 touchdown passes and was the NorCal Conference Offensive Player of the Year in 2008.

He later transferred to play for the Louisville Cardinals from 2009 to 2010. Froman recorded 17 touchdowns on 2,987 yards in 17 career games for the Cardinals.

== Professional career ==
Froman was rated the 13th best quarterback in the 2011 NFL draft by NFLDraftScout.com. The website also predicted that he would be selected in the sixth or seventh round.

Pre-draft measurables
Height	Weight	40-yard dash	10-yard split	20-yard split	20-yard shuttle	Three-cone drill	Vertical jump	Broad jump
6 ft 4 in (1.93 m)	220 lb (100 kg)	4.54 s	1.59 s	2.64 s	4.16 s	6.80 s	30 1/2 in (0.77 m)	9 ft 4 in (2.84 m)
All values from Louisville Pro Day

After going undrafted, Froman signed with the Atlanta Falcons on July 27, 2011. He was released by the Falcons on September 1, 2011.

On September 27, 2011, the Winnipeg Blue Bombers of the Canadian Football League signed Froman to the team's practice squad. He was released by the Blue Bombers on October 11, 2011.

On November 2, 2011, Froman signed with the Spokane Shock for the 2012 AFL season. He received playing time after starter Erik Meyer suffered an injury in the Shock's home opener. He recorded eight touchdowns on 459 passing yards for the Shock in 2012. Froman was released by the Shock on May 7, 2012.

== Career statistics ==
=== AFL ===
Year	Team	Passing							Rushing		
Year	Team	Cmp	Att	Pct	Yds	TD	Int	Rtg	Att	Yds	TD
2012	Spokane	48	69	69.6	459	8	6	80.53	12	85	4

Stats from ArenaFan:

=== College ===
Year	Team	Passing								Rushing			
Year	Team	Cmp	Att	Pct	Yds	Y/A	TD	Int	Rtg	Att	Yds	Avg	TD
2009	Louisville	111	185	60.0	1,354	7.3	6	5	126.8	61	78	1.3	0
2010	Louisville	132	218	60.6	1,633	7.5	11	4	136.5	36	75	2.1	2
Career		243	403	60.3	2,987	7.4	17	9	132.0	97	153	1.6	2

== Coaching career ==
Froman served as an offensive assistant for the LSU Tigers in 2012. He served as quarterback coach of the Valdosta State Blazers from 2013 to 2014.
