= Enduro =

Form of motorcycle sport

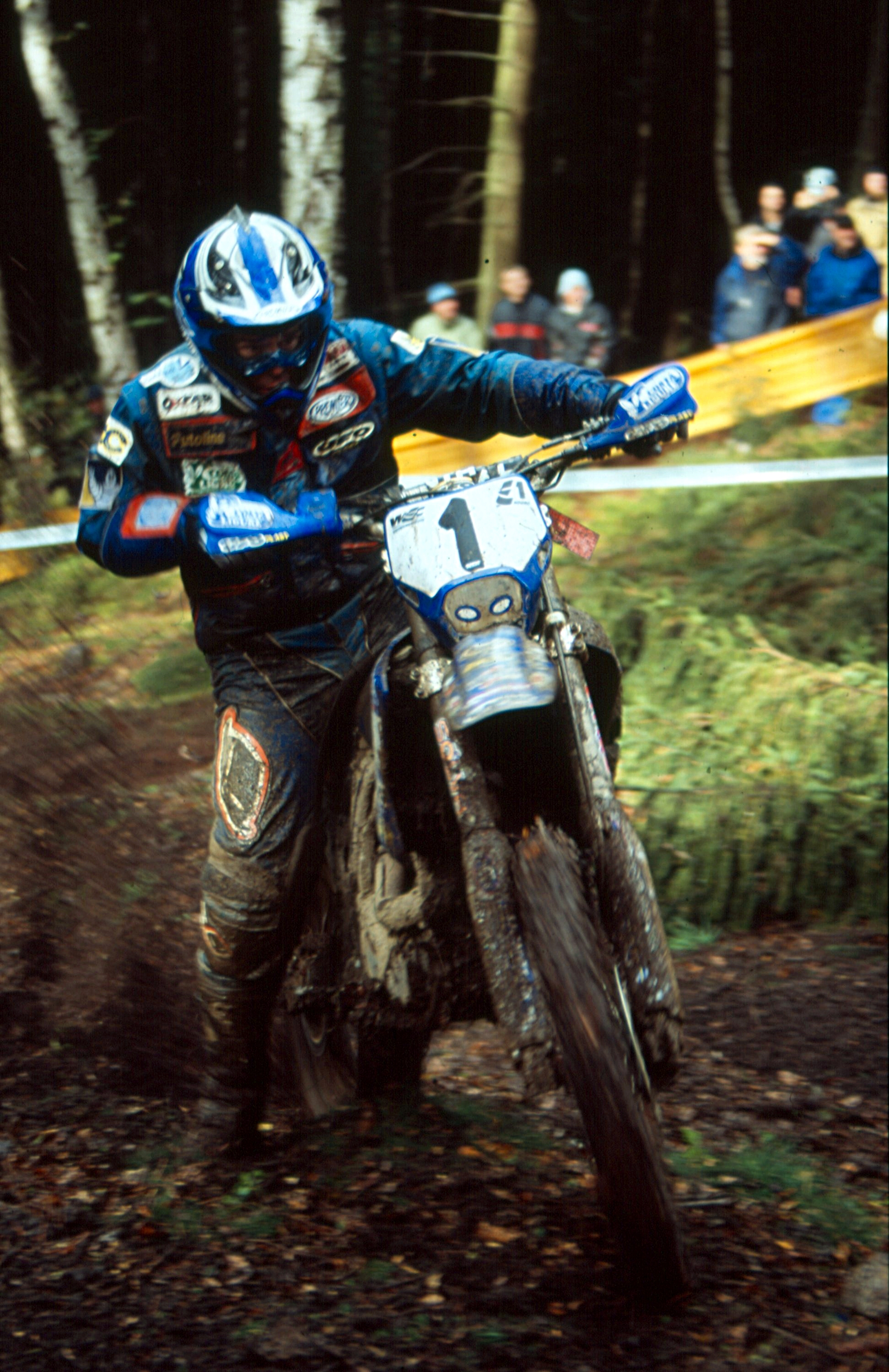
Four-time world champion Stefan Merriman on a Yamaha

Enduro is a form of off-road motorcycle sport run on extended cross-country courses. Enduro consists of many different obstacles and challenges. The main type of enduro event, and the format to which the FIM Enduro World Championship is run, is a time-card enduro, whereby a number of stages are raced in a time trial against the clock.

== Time-keeping enduros ==
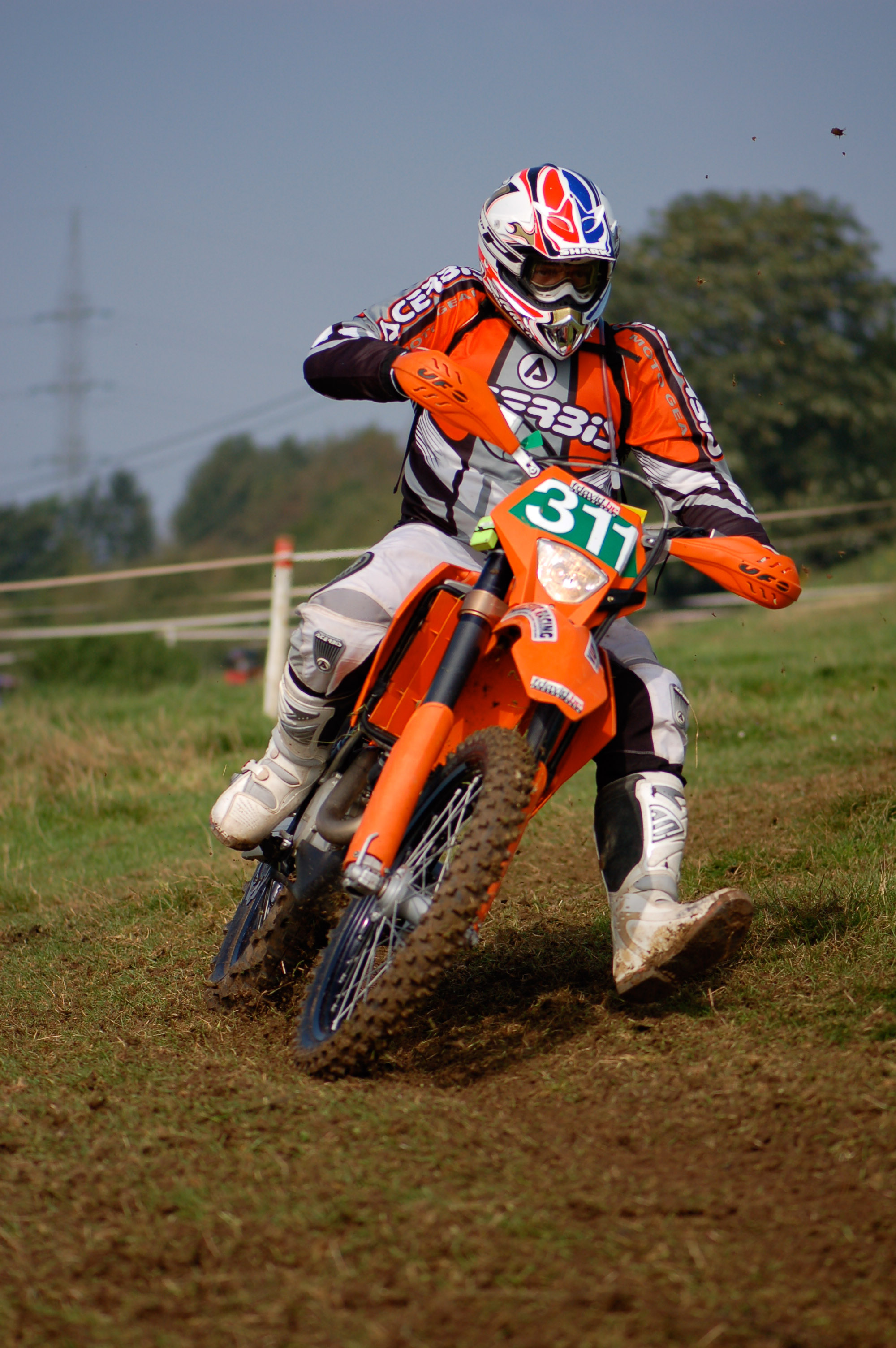
A KTM rider at the 2007 Enduro de Dinant

In a traditional time-keeping enduro, riders leave together in groups or rows, and each row starts at a certain minute. The object of the event is to arrive at pre-defined checkpoints according to a strict schedule. Early or late arrivals result in the riders' scores being penalized. Throughout a day there will also be allocated periods for refuelling and servicing the machine. Penalties apply for not meeting defined times or for outside-assistance when not permitted.

== Time keeping and restart ==
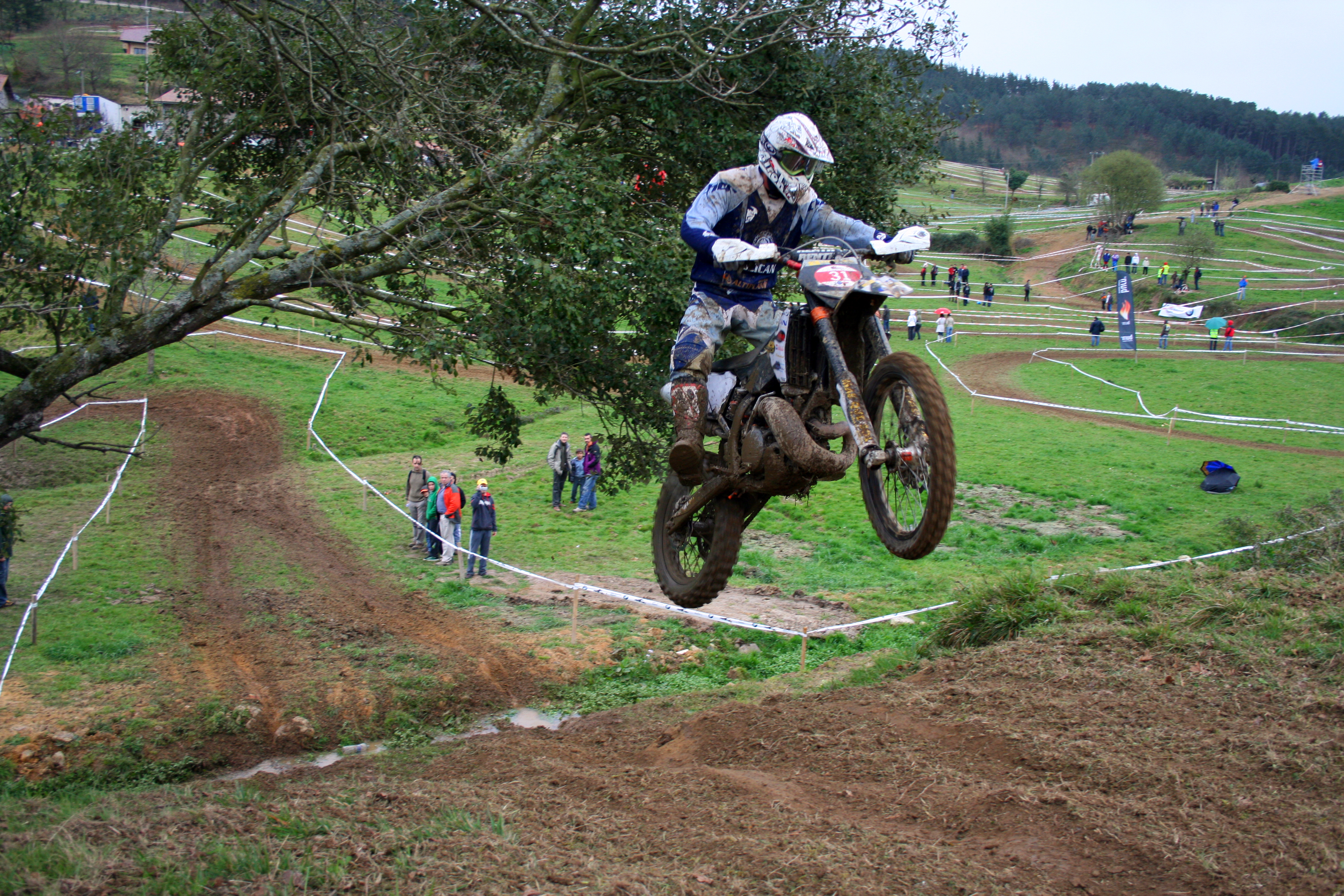
E2 bike jumping in Arratzu, Spain.

There are two different types of events — time keeping and restart. Within the international off-road motorcycle community, the term enduro traditionally refers specifically to time keeping events which require competitors to maintain a prescribed mile per hour average over varying terrain. Competitors are moderated by a series of secret time keeping checkpoints along the race course, and are penalized based on their arrival time to the checkpoints.

Restart events, on the other hand, are run on point to point courses where the competitor with the fastest time between the two points being declared the winner. Such courses may be shorter than the total length of the race, in which case the course is repeated several times, with each repetition being referred to as a lap. Such courses may also be very long such that competitors never cover the same ground twice.

== Motorcycles ==
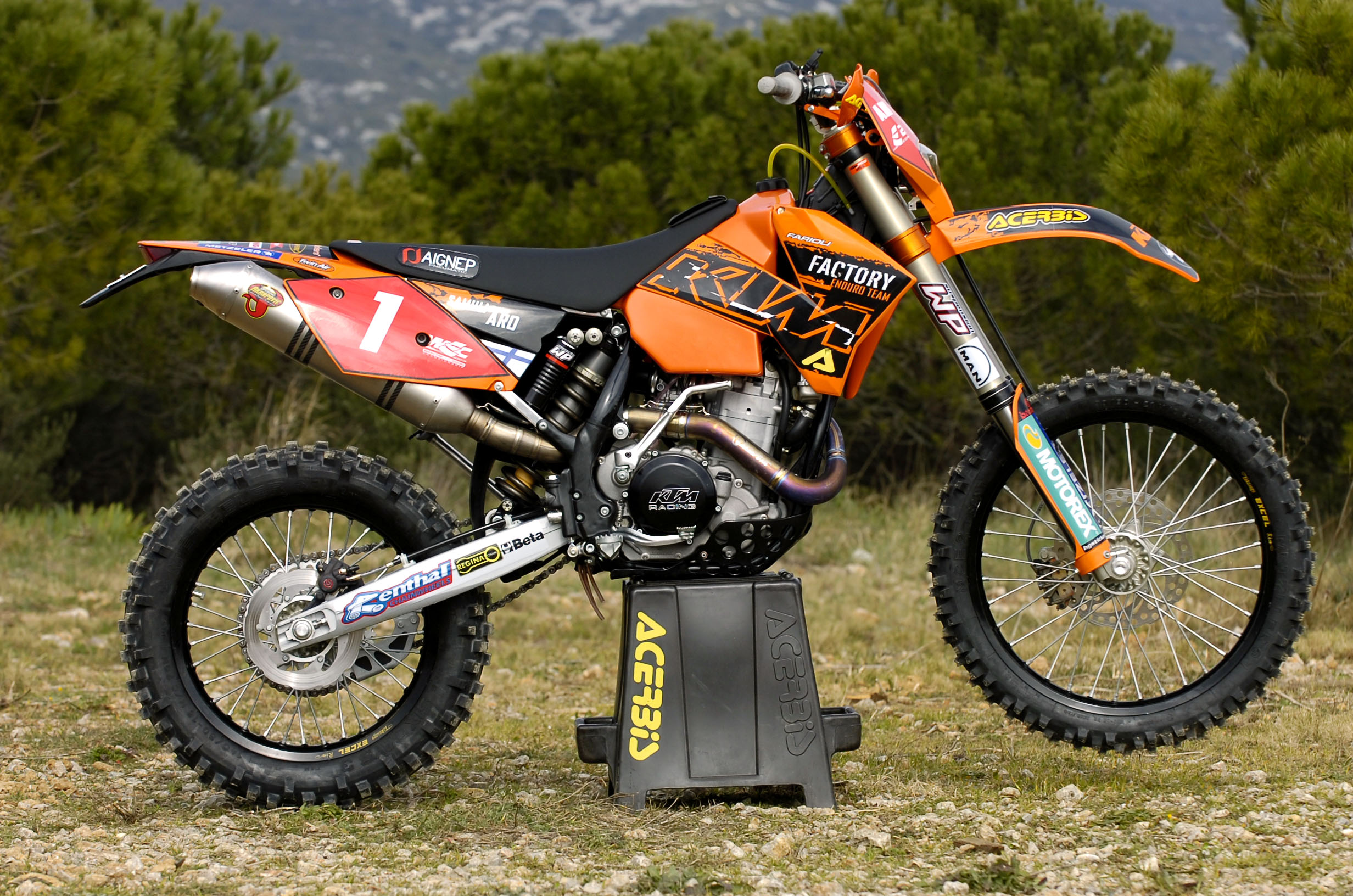
A WEC E2 class bike.

An enduro motorcycle is specialized for the nature of the sport, with the long suspension and engine power of a motocross bike combined with features for durability and long distances. Engines are generally single-cylinder two-stroke between 125 and 300 cc, or four-stroke between 250 and 650 cc.

The FIM Enduro World Championship and several other championships currently categorize enduro motorcycles into three classes; Enduro 1 (100–125 cc two-stroke or 175–250 cc four-stroke), Enduro 2 (175–250 cc two-stroke or 290–450 cc four-stroke) and Enduro 3 (290–500 cc two-stroke or 475–650 cc four-stroke).

Enduro motorcycles have evolved over time. In 1968 Yamaha introduced the DT1 for street/trail use which had the word "enduro" as a badge on its side panels. Bikes like these are now referred to as dual-sports.

== Events ==
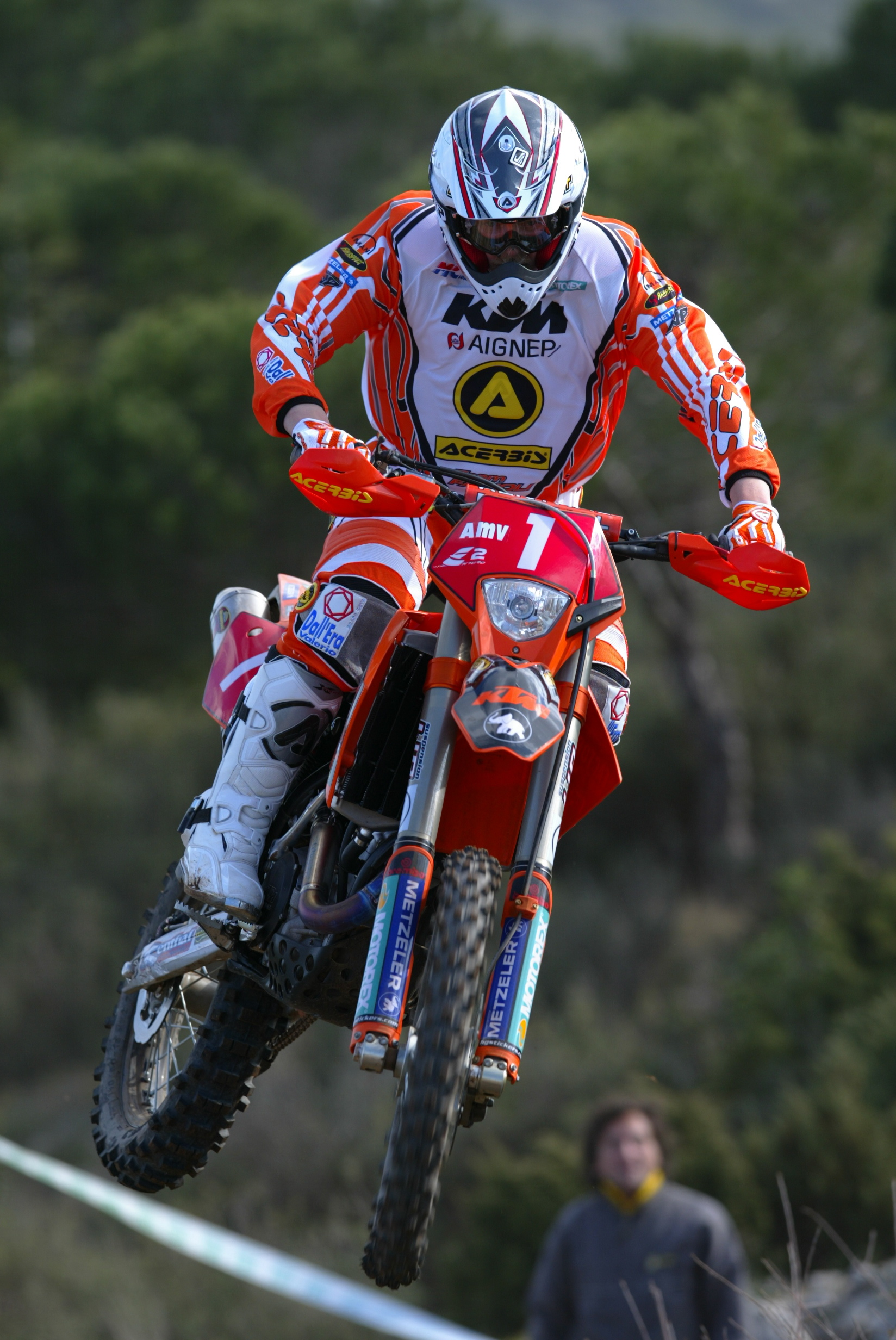
Samuli Aro riding his KTM in the world championship.

Major events in the enduro calendar include the FIM Enduro World Championship, the International Six Days Enduro (ISDE) and several national championships. The world governing body for enduro is the Fédération Internationale de Motocyclisme (FIM). In the United States, the national governing body is the American Motorcycle Association (AMA). In the United Kingdom, the national governing body is the Auto-Cycle Union.

=== FIM Enduro World Championship ===
The FIM Enduro World Championship was started in 1990, replacing the European Enduro Championship, which had been contested since 1968. The championship is run under the FIM and generally consists of around eight or nine Grands Prix spread around the globe. These events are split into two days (and two different races), from which points towards the world championship are awarded. Each round includes a motocross test and an "extreme test", in addition to the enduro test. In the 2008 season, Honda's Mika Ahola won the Enduro 1 class, Yamaha's Johnny Aubert took the Enduro 2 class and KTM's Samuli Aro won his fifth title in the Enduro 3 class.

=== World Enduro Super Series ===
The World Enduro Super Series (WESS) is a championship started in 2018. All of the races in the series had been previously run as separate events, and this series brings in 11 races from around Europe to crown the World Enduro Champion. The best enduro riders from around the world come to compete in hare scrambles, hard enduros, and enduro cross, classic enduros, etc. Red Bull covers the series on YouTube and a WESS website is updated with the events schedule each year.

=== ISDE ===
The International Six Days Enduro (ISDE) has been held since 1913, and it is the oldest off-road event in the FIM calendar. The event brings together the best riders to represent their national team, and it is often referred to as the "World Cup of Enduro" or the "Olympics of Motorcycling".

=== AMA ===
The American Motorcycle Association is the primary sanctioning body for motorcycle races of all types in the United States of America. AMA series are often analogous to FIM series. The East Coast Enduro Association is one of the most prominent organizers of enduro races in the US. The ECEA has multiple classes divided by bike type and rider demographic that allow a qualified rider to choose a class to compete in.

Each skill class (A, B, C) is divided into sub-classes depending on machine type, rider age, and gender. Some examples include "C 4-stroke," "C-Veteran (30+)," "B 2-Stroke Light," "B 2-Stroke Heavy," "Women's", etc... Generally speaking, there are rewards at both the event and season level for each sub-class (i.e., "I was the B 2-Stroke Light winner at this event..."). Classes include age brackets as high as 80+ (Legends class).

The following is a list of bike classes:

- Class AA - The most accomplished level of rider, same as "Class A", but who competes for points as part of the AMA National Enduro Championship. For example, Mike Lafferty, who is the seven-time AMA national champion, competes in the AA class.
- Class A - These are also the fastest riders, but they are not competing for points as part of the national championship. Their awards are restricted to the AMA region in which they compete. They are amateur participants, although they possess a skill level comparable to many of the AA riders.
- Class B - This is the second level of rider skill (one step up from the entry level C-class). Riders are "promoted" by the AMA when they have received a certain number of points (promotion points are different from the points that are awarded during a race; points during a race are bad, as the goal is to finish an event with as close to 0 points as possible, whereas title/promotion points are awarded at the end of each event depending on how well each rider performed - the dual use of the nomenclature "points" can often be confusing to outside observers, because the connotation of having points during an event is negative, whereas the connotation of having points relative to a rider's standing in a series is generally positive).
- Class C - This is the entry level where all new riders begin. All riders start off as C-class riders and if they continue to participate in and finish events they will likely be promoted to B-class after two or three seasons. Exceptional riders will make the leap to B-class after their first season because they will have accumulated the requisite points quickly enough.

Because of the variety of awards that are possible, riders are sometimes accused of sandbagging.

=== Regional events ===
In addition to races and series sanctioned by national associations, a large number of events are also held at the local and regional level by smaller governing bodies.

In the US these events closely resemble AMA sanctioned events, utilizing the same A, B, C skill classes. Many riders begin their racing careers at events such as these.

== Popularity ==
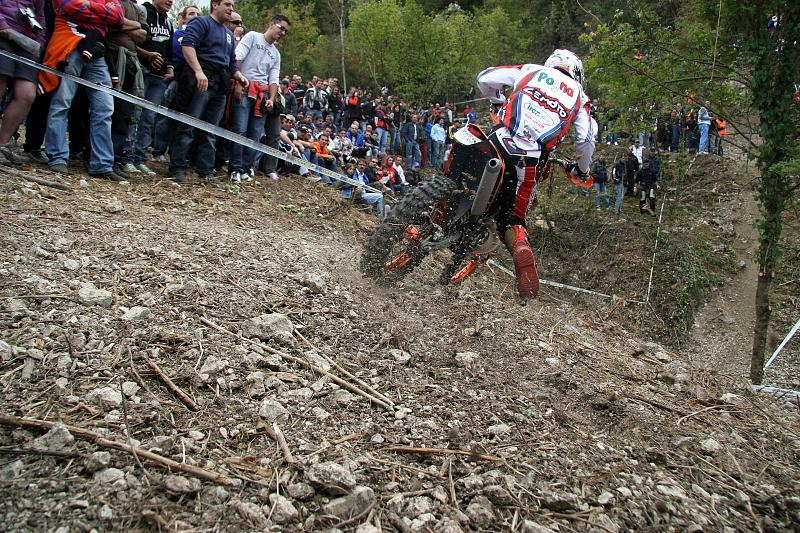
Spectators watch a junior class rider in Italy.

The popularity of enduro varies widely by continent, country, region, and even by event type. Some popular events are loosely categorized as enduros even though they fall into a category of off-road racing that is known as rally racing or rally raid.

== Variations ==
In addition to rallying and rally raids, there are other off-road races that are very similar to enduros but that vary in that they are not necessarily timekeeping events and in that they are often sanctioned by other bodies than the primary enduro sanctioning bodies.

One example in the USA is the Grand National Cross Country, which more closely resembles hare scrambles, such as the Austrian Erzberg Rodeo than enduros, but is on a shorter course of perhaps a few miles/kilometers in length that is repeated for several laps. GNCC is famous for the high level of ATV (four-wheeled off-road vehicles) competition in addition to motorcycle competition.

=== Indoor enduro ===
Endurocross or indoor enduro is a variation of enduro held indoors. Riders must complete as quick as possible a course with obstacles similar to those in enduro.

=== Hard enduro ===
Hard enduro takes enduro racing to extremes with even larger, longer and tougher courses than enduro. The FIM Hard Enduro World Championship is the main championship in this category.

== Notable enduro riders ==
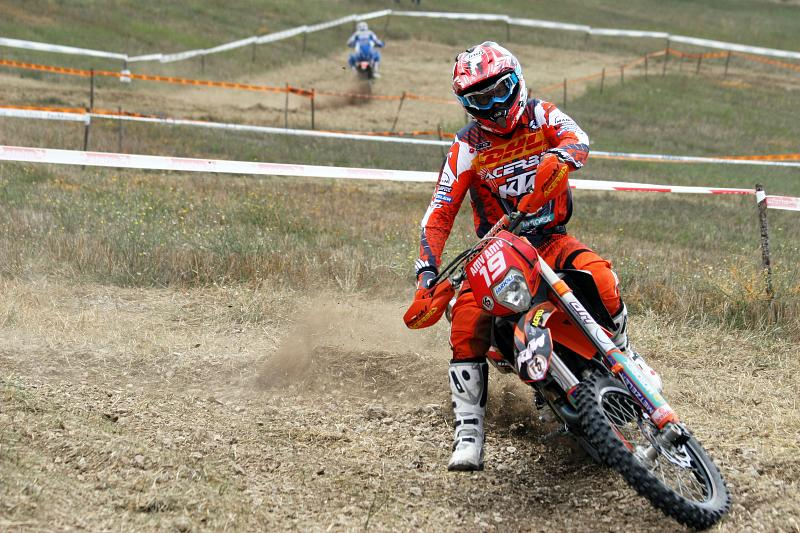
12-time world champion Juha Salminen at the 2008 GP of Italy

- Mika Ahola – five-time world champion
- Samuli Aro – five-time world champion
- Steward Baylor Jr. – three-time AMA national enduro champion and AMA full gas sprint enduro champion
- Dick Burleson – eight-time AMA national champion and AMA Motorcycle Hall of Fame member
- Andy Caldecott
- Iván Cervantes – three-time world champion
- Carl Cranke – five-time ISDT gold medalist and AMA Motorcycle Hall of Fame member
- John Deacon
- Paul Edmondson – four-time world champion
- Anders Eriksson – seven-time world champion
- David Knight – two-time world champion
- Mike Lafferty – multiple AMA national champion
- Fabrizio Meoni – Dakar Rally winner
- Stefan Merriman – four-time world champion
- John Penton, American Enduro motorcycle pioneer
- Stéphane Peterhansel – multiple world champion and Dakar Rally winner
- Xavier Pons
- Mario Rinaldi – four-time world champion
- Richard Sainct – Dakar Rally winner
- Giovanni Sala – six-time world champion
- Juha Salminen – 13-time world champion
- Petteri Silván – five-time world champion
- Malcolm Smith
- Kari Tiainen – seven-time world champion
- Jaroslav Katrinak – one-time world champion
- Josef Macháček – one-time world champion
- Billy Uhl – five-time ISDT gold medalist and AMA Motorcycle Hall of Fame member
- Laia Sanz - five-time world champion (Women)
- Rabie Yaakoub – two-times winner of lebanese championship

== Injuries ==
Khanna et al. (2015) reviewed the literature on sports injuries in enduro riders, finding: "The extremities are the most injured parts in enduro. However, 98% of these injuries are mild to moderate". With only four studies on off-road motorcycle injuries, they concluded: “there is paucity of published data on enduro injuries. In depth understanding of the physiological aspect of enduro riders with close monitoring of injuries is needed to promote safety measures in enduro and to reduce risk factors of injury which in turn can help to make enduro a safe alternative to the other dangerous motorcycling sports.”

== See also ==
- FIM Hard Enduro World Championship
- Supermoto
