= Billy Uhl =

American motorcycle racer

Billy Uhl (born April 22, 1950) is an American former professional motorcycle enduro competitor. He represented the United States in the International Six Day Trials in the 1970s, winning five gold medals.

The son of a motorcycle dealer, he was born in Wooster, Ohio and grew up in Idaho. Uhl competed in several different off-road motorcycling disciplines including motocross, trials, dirt track oval racing and hillclimbs. In 1969, Uhl became the youngest ISDT gold medal winner at the age of nineteen. After his retirement from competition, he became active in designing off-road trails as well as becoming an advocate for responsible off-road vehicle usage.

Uhl was inducted into the AMA Motorcycle Hall of Fame in 2007.
