= Dick Burleson =

American motorcycle racer

Richard Burleson (born 1948) is an American former motorcycle enduro racer. He is considered one of the top competitors in AMA history, winning a record eight consecutive Enduro National Championships. His domination of the national enduro series earned him the nickname King Richard. Burleson was inducted into the AMA Motorcycle Hall of Fame in 1999 and was named an AMA Legend in 2016.

== Motorcycle racing career ==
Born in Johnson City, Tennessee, Burleson began his competitive career riding in motocross events in the late 1960s. He joined the professional ranks in 1970 entering the 1970 Trans-AMA motocross series which featured visiting European riders who dominated the sport at the time. Burleson finished fourth overall and was the highest placed American rider, garnering the title of motocross national champion in the days before the AMA had a dedicated national championship series.

Burleson also began competing in enduro events and found that he enjoyed that form of competition. He would go on to win a record setting eight consecutive enduro national championships as well as earning eight consecutive gold medals representing the United States in the International Six Days Trial. The International Six Days Trial is a form of off-road motorcycle Olympics that is the oldest annual competition sanctioned by the FIM, dating back to 1913. In all, Burleson won 60 AMA National Enduro events during his career.

After retiring from racing in 1982, Burleson remained active in the sport, starting a mail order motorcycle accessory business and helped design a line of off-road riding apparel. He was inducted into the AMA Motorcycle Hall of Fame in 1999. Burleson was inducted into the Motorsports Hall of Fame of America in 2023.

== Personal life ==
Burleson is married to Jill Burleson and they reside in Traverse City, Michigan. They have two children, a son Jon-Erik and daughter Lindsay Kate. Jon-Erik Burleson was president of KTM North America from 2005-2016.
