= History of women in engineering in the United Kingdom =

Women in engineering in the UK

Women have played a role in engineering in the United Kingdom for hundreds of years, despite the various societal barriers facing them. In the 18th and 19th century, there were few formal training opportunities for women to train as engineers and frequently women were introduced to engineering through family companies or their spouses. Some women did have more formal educations in the late 19th century and early 20th century, normally in mathematics or science subjects. There are several examples of women filing patents in the 19th century, including Sarah Guppy, Henrietta Vansittart and Hertha Ayrton.

During the first two decades of the 20th century new opportunities arose for women to go to university and earn degrees and there were increasing numbers of women studying maths and physics at universities across the UK. The job opportunities for women opened up by World War I meant many women were trained in various forms of engineering. In 1919, the Women's Engineering Society (WES) was founded to protect these jobs for women, which, once the war ended, were handed back to the men returning from the front, as decreed by the Restoration of Pre-War Practices Act (1919).

The 1920s and 30s produced many successful women engineers, who were able to forge careers for themselves in various fields, including aeronautical, automotive and electrical engineering. Many of these women were members of WES.

== 19th century ==
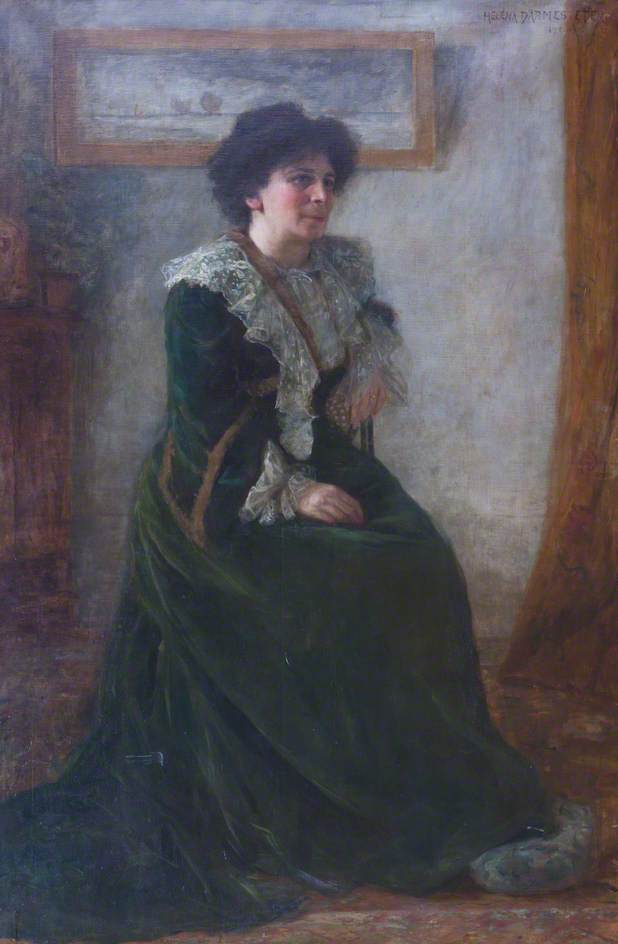
Portrait of Hertha Ayrton by Helena Arsène Darmesteter

Inventors and engineers in the early 19th century in the UK include Sarah Guppy, the first woman in the UK to patent a bridge. Later in the 19th century, there are more examples of women patenting inventions and practising as engineers. Naval engineer Henrietta Vansittart, who was introduced to engineering by her father James Lowe, contributed to naval engineering and held patents across the world for the Lowe-Vansittart propeller. Similarly, another naval engineer, Blanche Thornycroft, found her way into engineering through a family connection. She worked as part of her father's engineering business on the Isle of Wight. In 1834, Janet Taylor a scientific instrument designer patented a Mariner's Calculator considered "genius but impractical in the 'clumsy' hands of its potential users".

Electrical engineer and physicist, Hertha Ayrton, was the first woman admitted to the IEE (the Institution of Electrical Engineers, now the IET), the premier British electrical engineering profession institution, in recognition of her work on electrical arc lighting.

Many women in this era were collaborators in engineering projects with their husbands. The effort to electrify the home in the late 19th century involved many women, including Alice Mary Gordon, who wrote a book called Decorative Electricity, which included a section detailing life as an engineering spouse. Katharine Parsons worked with her husband Sir Charles Parsons on the steam turbine engine and later founded the Women's Engineering Society. Margaret, Lady Moir described herself as an "engineer by marriage" through her relationship with Ernest Moir. Several of the women who went on to be founding members of WES were also involved in the women's suffrage movement, including Katharine Parsons and her daughter, Rachel Parsons, Lady Moir, Laura Annie Willson (who was arrested twice for suffragette activities) and Caroline Haslett.

== Early 20th century ==
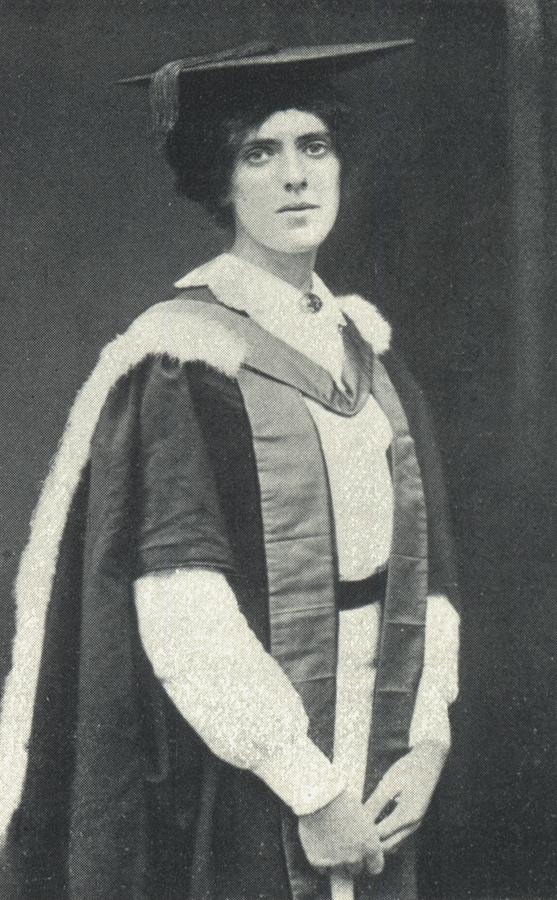
Nina Cameron Graham became the first British woman to earn an engineering degree in 1912

The 1911 census recorded no woman listing her profession as an engineer. However, at the start of the 20th century in the UK, there were greater opportunities for women to study at university and there were more instances of women studying for degrees in physics, mathematics, and engineering subjects. Nina Cameron Graham graduated from University of Liverpool in 1912 with a degree in Civil Engineering, the first British woman to qualify as an engineer. She married a fellow student and moved to Canada. Electrical Engineer and businesswoman Margaret Partridge studied maths at Bedford College, graduating in 1914. Aeronautical engineer Hilda Lyon went to study maths at Newnham College, Cambridge in 1915. Many women attended Loughborough College (now University), which admitted the first cohort of women engineers in 1919, including mechanical engineer Verena Holmes and engineer, writer and traveller Claudia Parsons. Georgina Kermode's career as socialite, suffragette, metallurgist and serial patentee (in particular the first successful postage stamp selling machines), seems to have emerged from her early marriage to an engineer, whom she soon left behind.

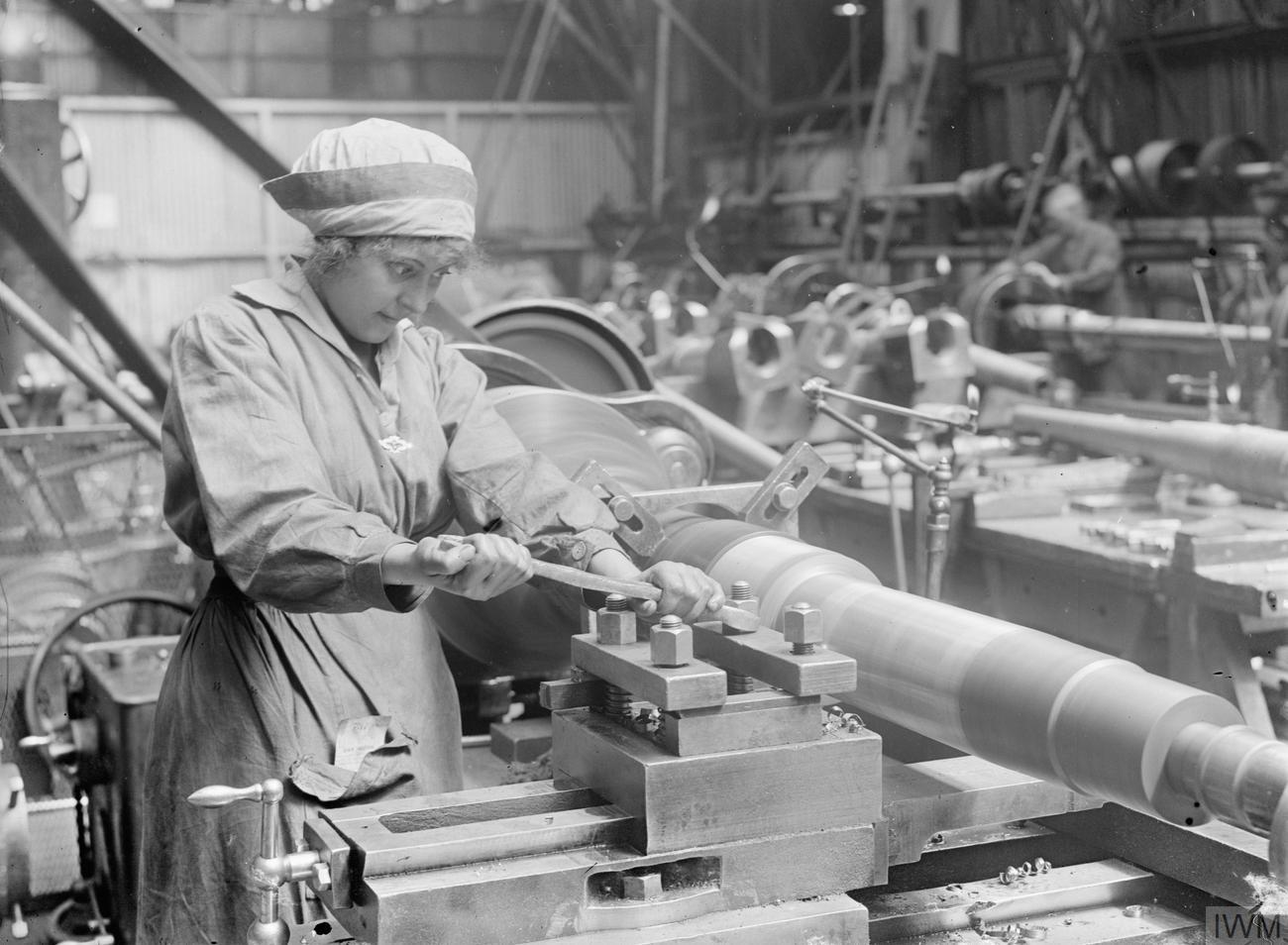
A woman adjusting the nuts of a turning machine at one of the Tyne shipbuilding yards, Newcastle, 1918.

Many women gained engineering experience during World War One. As men were away fighting, jobs in factories had to be filled by women. Women in engineering such as Dorothée Pullinger, Rachel Parsons, Margaret Dorothea Rowbotham and Laura Annie Willson all learned important aspects of their trades through working during World War One, particularly in the production of munitions. Recognition of the roles naval architects Blanche Thornycroft, Eily Keary, and Rachel Parsons played was recognised on 9 April 1919 when they became the first three women to be admitted as associate members by the Royal Institution of Naval Architects, Keary having been the first woman to contribute a paper in the institution's transactions in 1916.

Once the war was over, these jobs were threatened by the Restoration of Pre-War Practices Act (1919), which stated that the jobs women filled had to be handed back to the men returning from the front. Another act of parliament later in 1919 attempted to improve women's professional and educational rights. The Sex Disqualification (Removal) Act 1919 received Royal Assent on 23 December 1919. The act enabled women to join the professions and professional bodies (including those representing the engineering professions), to sit on juries and be awarded degrees:

"A person shall not be disqualified by sex or marriage from the exercise of any public function, or from being appointed to or holding any civil or judicial office or post, or from entering or assuming or carrying on any civil profession or vocation, or for admission to any incorporated society (whether incorporated by Royal Charter or otherwise)..."

It was an enabling act, not an enforcing one, but did open the doors of the professional engineering institutions to women who could earn the qualifications and had the professional experience required to pass the entry examinations.

== The founding of the Women's Engineering Society ==
The Women's Engineering Society - the first of its kind in the world - was founded on 23 June 1919 to protect the jobs that women had gained during World War One and to continue promoting the place of women in engineering. Seven women signed the foundation documents: Eleanor Shelley-Rolls, Margaret, Lady Moir, Laura Annie Willson, Margaret Rowbotham, Katharine Parsons, Rachel Parsons and Janetta Mary Ornsby. The first Secretary appointed was Caroline Haslett, who had trained as a boiler-maker during World War One, and was later made a Dame for her services to industry and business. The United States equivalent, the Society of Women Engineers (SWE), was founded in 1950.

== Inter war period ==
Through these new opportunities, the 1920s and 1930s in the UK were an active time for women in engineering and WES. In 1923 Elsie Louisa Winterton, a draughtswoman working for the Great Western Railway (GWR) became the first woman member of the Institution of Railway Signal Engineers.

In 1924, members of WES, including Caroline Haslett, Margaret Moir and Margaret Partridge founded the Electrical Association for Women, from an idea espoused by Mabel Lucy Matthews. This association aimed to educate women about electricity, providing courses in Electrical Housecraft and demonstrations at electrical showrooms. It published The Electrical Handbook for Women, a guide to electricity, which was re-issued (though with different names) until 1983. That same year, engineering project manager Kathleen M. Butler travelled to London to set up the project offices for the Sydney Harbour Bridge team at Dorman Long, at the same time that Dorothy Donaldson Buchanan started work at the company.

In July 1925 the First International Conference of Women in Science, Industry & Commerce was held in London, during the British Empire Exhibition. It was organised by Caroline Haslett & WES, and opened by the Duchess of York in her first public engagement since her marriage into the royal family. Chaired by Lady Astor, the first woman MP to take her seat in the House of Commons, its speakers and attendee list represented key figures in the suffrage and women's rights movements in Britain and abroad, including Millicent Fawcett, Viscountess Rhondda, Kerstin Hesselgren the first woman elected to Upper House of the Swedish parliament and American engineer Ethel H. Bailey.

Also in 1925, Annette Ashberry was the first woman to be elected to the UK Society of Engineers and delivered the first address by a woman to the Society's members on 1 November 1926.

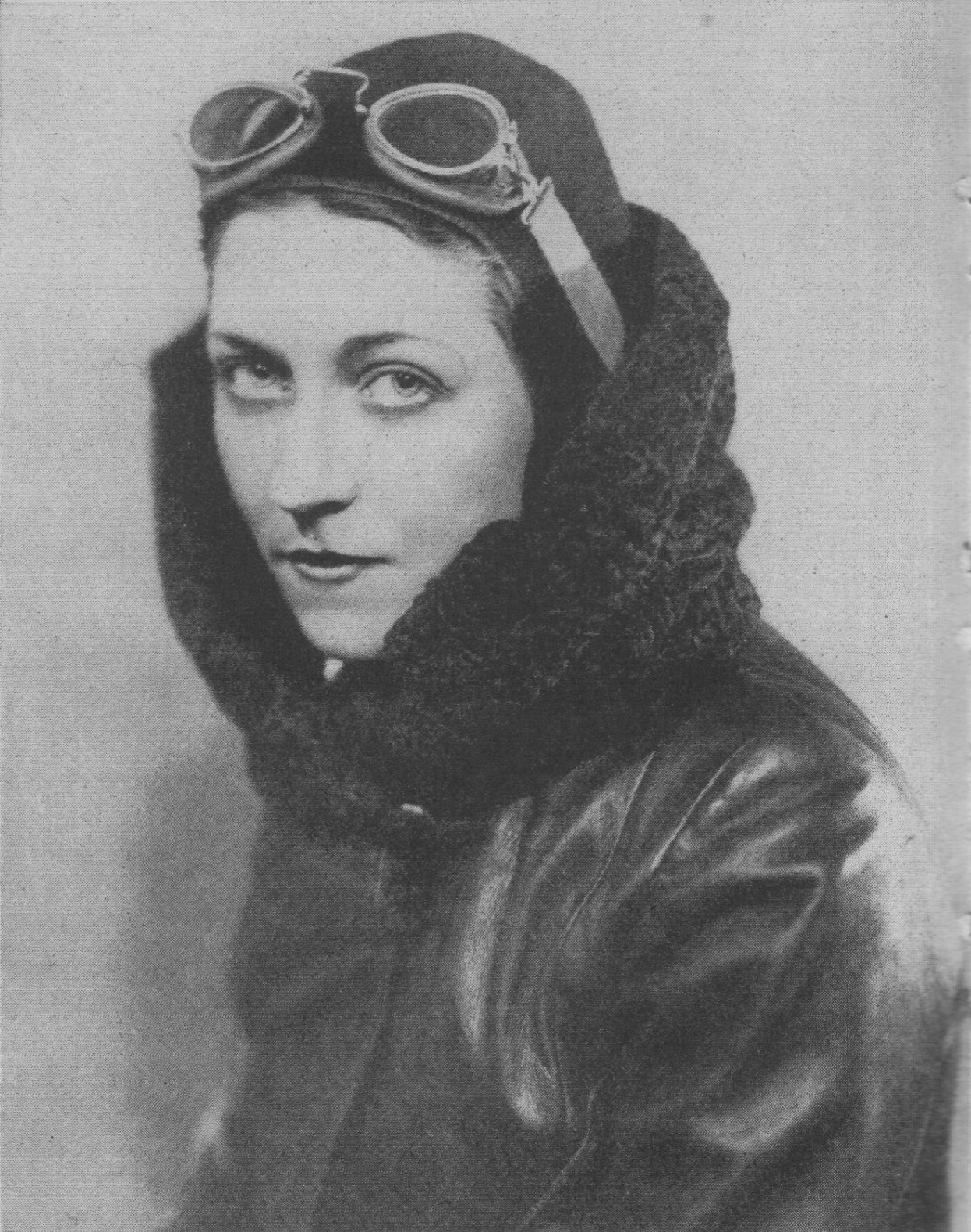
In 1934, pilot and engineer Amy Johnson became the youngest president of WES

Careers developed in companies such as Metropolitan Vickers in Manchester, where engineer Gertrude Entwisle worked for her entire career. In 1927, Dorothy Donaldson Buchanan successfully passed the admission examination to become the first female member of the Institution of Civil Engineers. In 1929 Winifred Hackett was the first woman to graduate in electrical engineering from the University of Birmingham. By the 1950s Hackett was head of the Guided Weapons Division at aerospace and defence company English Electric.

In 1934, pilot and engineer Amy Johnson became the youngest president of WES, serving under her married name of 'Mrs Jim Mollison', four years after becoming the first woman to fly solo from the UK to Australia. That same year, Jeanie Dicks, the first female member of the Electrical Contractors Association, was responsible for the first permanent electrification of Winchester Cathedral. A register of members from 1935 shows the international membership of WES and the variety of different women who were members.

Before World War Two, German Jewish engineer Ira Rischowski took refuge in the United Kingdom, becoming a member of WES, having already been in correspondence with them at the start of the War. Because of her German heritage, she was interned as an enemy alien at the Rushen camp on the Isle of Wight but returned to an engineering career once freed in 1942. In 1938, Marja Ludwika Ziff (later known as Maria Watkins) became the first woman to study electrical engineering at the University of Edinburgh, the professor who had offered her a place believing her application was from a Polish man. She later became a defence engineer and university lecturer.

== World War Two ==
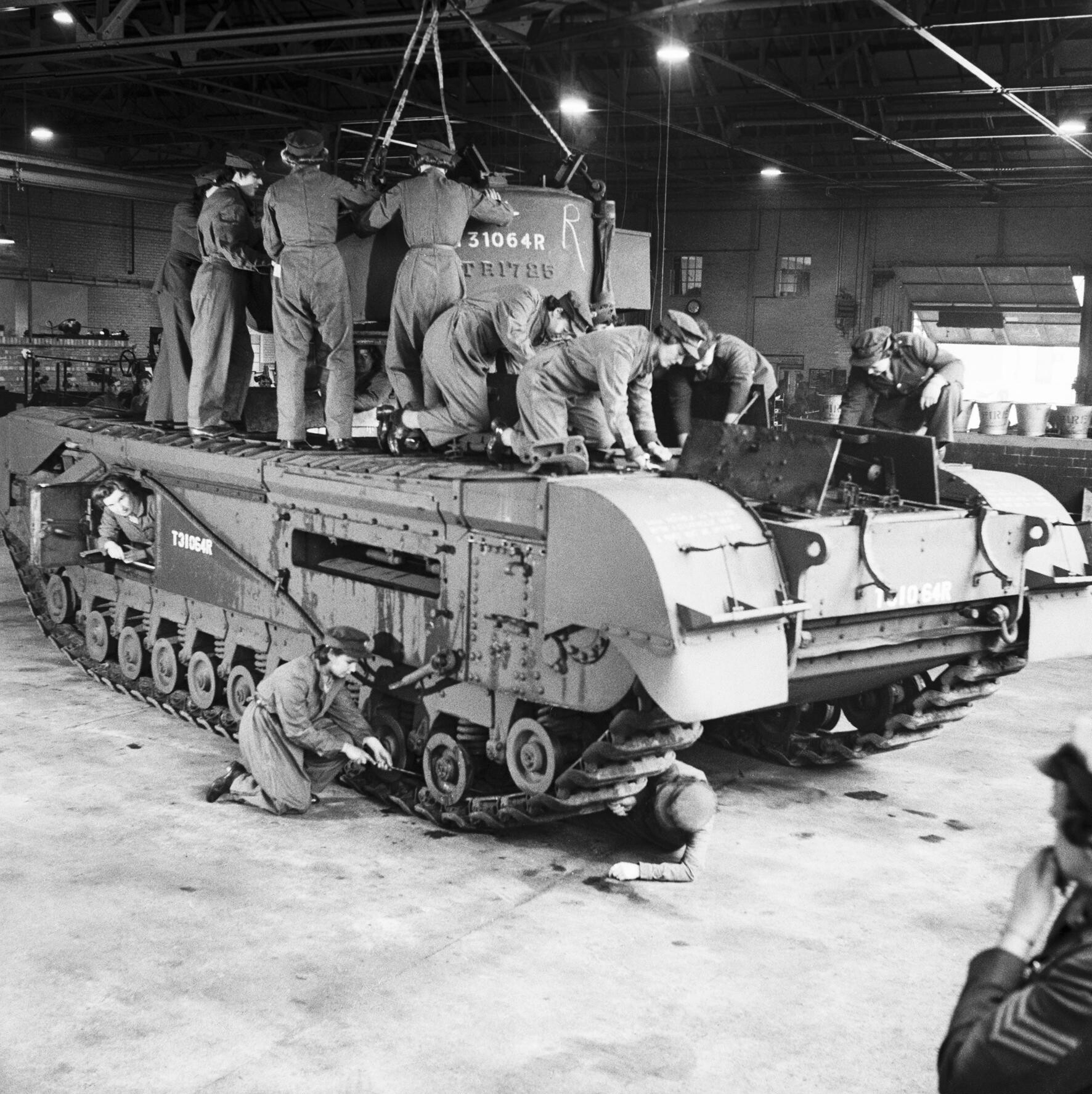
Women of the Auxiliary Territorial Service (ATS) working on a Churchill tank at a Royal Army Ordnance Corps depot, 10 October 1942.

Women continued to play an active role in engineering in World War Two and WES were vocal about promoting women's place in industry. Women proved once again their ability to take on roles seen as exclusively for men, while women with formal training in engineering from before the War were able to demonstrate their innovative capacity. Aeronautical engineer Beatrice Shilling, for example, engineered the RAE restrictor for use in Hurricane and Spitfire planes, which had previously been failing during air battle.

Isabel Hardwich, electrical engineer and photometry expert joined the Metropolitan-Vickers Electrical Company Ltd. in Manchester in 1941, and later became supervisor of technical women within their Research Department, as well as a president of WES.

During the war, Victoria Drummond, the first woman marine engineer in the UK and the first woman member of Institute of Marine Engineers, served at sea as an engineering officer in the British Merchant Navy. She received awards for bravery under enemy fire for her engineering skills which saved on the merchant ship Bonita under enemy fire in 1940.

== Post-war, Cold War and second wave feminism ==
Although women who had gained engineering opportunities in both industry and the forces during World War Two were forced out of those positions in an almost identical situation to that following World War One, there were enough women sufficiently established in senior roles in government research establishments, such as the Royal Aircraft Establishment, Building Research Establishment and similar, that there continued to be more openings for women. Beatrice Shilling, for instance, remained at the RAE to work on rocket engines and was consulted by NASA on runway surfaces for the future space shuttles. Johanna Weber arrived at RAE in 1947 from Germany and worked on calculations that let to the delta wing used on the Handley Page HP115 and Concorde. In the same era, Anne Burns introduced the use of strain gauges for inflight testing, contributing to solving the reasons for the Comet airliner crashes of the 1950s.

In 1947 Mary Thompson Irvine became the first woman to be elected a chartered member of the Institution of Structural Engineers. In the early 1950s Mary Coombs became the first woman to work on a commercial computer, the LEO computer. In 1954, Mary Sudbury became the only female engineer to work on the wind tunnels used for supersonic aircraft testing at RAE, and part of the development of Concorde, but still encountered petty misogyny. In 1958 Dorothy Smith, an electrical engineer at Metropolitan-Vickers, was awarded Full Membership of the Institution of Electrical Engineers, the first woman since Hertha Ayrton in 1899, to reach this level of membership.

In 1962, Steve Shirley founded software company Freelance Programmers with a capital of £6, (later FI, then Xansa, since acquired by Steria and now part of the Sopra Steria Group). Having experienced sexism in her workplace, "being fondled, being pushed against the wall", she wanted to create job opportunities for women with dependents, and predominantly employed women, with only three male programmers in the first 300 staff, until the Sex Discrimination Act 1975 made that practice illegal. She also adopted the name "Steve" to help her in the male-dominated business world, given that company letters signed using her real name were not responded to. Her team's projects included programming Concorde's black box flight recorder.

In 1967, WES led the organisation of the second International Conference of Women Engineers and Scientists, held in Cambridge, which had first been held in 1964 in New York initiated by the Society of Women Engineers. The conference was attended by delegates from across the globe, with many international speakers, including from African and Asian countries.

Tidal engineer Mary Kendrick began leading the team working on the Thames Barrier in 1968. She later became the first female Acting Conservator of the River Mersey responsible for keeping the River Mersey navigable, a role dating back to 1625.

In 1969, Shirley Williams MP, then Minister for Education and Science, launched the first Women in Engineering Year campaign in conjunction with WES to encourage girls and young women to take up engineering as a career.

Although numbers were tiny until the 1970s, increasing numbers of women started to take university degrees and trade qualifications in engineering subjects. It was still a period when a talented person could rise from the technician ranks without a degree, as defence engineer Joan Lavender was able to do at DeHavillands and engineering software designer Judy Butland was able to do at Manchester University and then with her own software business. The defence industry, aviation and the emerging computer hardware and software industries were areas when many women found careers at that time. Examples include Elizabeth Killick, WES presidents Elizabeth Laverick and Peggy Hodges and the founder of the UK's first independent commercial software company, Dina St Johnston.

In 1979 the Finniston Report into the engineering profession in the United Kingdom was commissioned by the Labour government. This ultimately led to the foundation of the Engineering Council in 1981, which in its turn collaborated with the Equal Opportunities Commission (EOC) to launch the Women into Science and Engineering (WISE) year in 1984. Spearheaded by Baroness Beryl Platt, Chair of the EOC and herself an aeronautical engineer, WISE aimed to highlight the career opportunities for girls and women in science and engineering professions. At the time of the launch of WISE, only 7% of engineering graduates in the UK were women.

== See also ==
- History of women in engineering
- Women in engineering
- List of prizes, medals, and awards for women in engineering
- African women in engineering
- Category:Women in technology
- Women in computing
- Women in science
- Women in the workforce
- International Conference of Women Engineers and Scientists (ICWES)
