= Eleanor Shelley-Rolls =

British engineer

- Born: Eleanor Rolls; 9 October 1872; Mayfair, London, England
- Died: 15 September 1961 (aged 88); Westminster, London, England
- Occupation: Engineer
- Organization: Women's Engineering Society
- Spouse: John Courtown Edward Shelley (m. 1898)

Eleanor Georgiana Shelley-Rolls (9 October 1872 – 15 September 1961) was one of the original signatories of the Women's Engineering Society founding documents.

== Early life ==
Eleanor Georgiana Rolls was born in Mayfair, London on 9 October 1872. She was the daughter of John Allan Rolls, 1st Baron Llangattock and Georgiana Marcia Maclean. Her three brothers, Charles Rolls, John Maclean Rolls, and Henry Allan Rolls, all predeceased her, dying without issue, so she inherited the family estate The Hendre, near Monmouth.

== Personal life ==
Rolls married John Courtown Edward Shelley in 1898, they both changed their surname legally to Shelley-Rolls in 1917 when she inherited the family estate at The Hendre on the death of her brother John, 2nd Baron Llangattock in 1916. Before World War One, she and her husband flew in hot air balloons, often sharing a flight with May Assheton Harbord, the first woman to hold an Aeronaut's Certificate in UK. The couple in one of the earliest Zeppelins, and in an early type of aeroplane in the pre war years.

== Career ==
On 23 June 1919, she became one of the seven co-signatures of the Memorandum of Association for the formation of the Women's Engineering Society alongside Rachel Parsons; Lady Katharine Parsons; Janetta Mary Ornsby; Margaret Rowbotham; Margaret, Lady Moir and Laura Annie Willson. With Margaret Partridge, Shelley-Rolls canvassed support for electrification of Britain. She attended the first statutory meeting of the Women's Engineering Society in 1920.

She remained on the Women's Engineering Society Advisory Council, was part of the Women's Engineering Society's 1925 Conference of Women. She acted as the Women's Engineering Society's representative on the Electrical Association for Women board.

Shelley-Rolls was a member of the Council Industrial Co-partnership, a member of the Air League and the Executive League of Empire.

She was a principal investor and later President of the Women's Pioneer Housing, and a school manager.

She studied and wrote about the history of motoring and in later life took up breeding of Welsh Black Cattle.

In 1920, she founded Atlanta Co Ltd, Loughborough, with Katharine Parsons. Atlanta Co Ltd only employed women, including Annette Ashberry. She was the main beneficiary of Baron Llangattock's £1.1 million estate. She died on 15 September 1961, aged 88.
