= Isabel Hardwich =

English electrical engineer (1919–1987)

Isabel Hardwich MIEE CEng MInstP
- Hardwich at Cambridge in 1967
- Born: Isabel Helen Cox; 19 September 1919; Streatham, London, England
- Died: 19 February 1987 (aged 67); Flixton, Trafford, Greater Manchester, England
- Resting place: Manchester Crematorium (ashes interred)
- Education: Newnham College, University of Cambridge (1945: MA (Cantab))
- Occupations: Electrical engineer; photometrist
- Engineering career
- Employer: Metropolitan‑Vickers Electrical Company Ltd

Isabel Helen Hardwich MIEE CEng MInstP (née Cox; 19 September 1919 – 19 February 1987) was an English electrical engineer, an expert in photometry, and fellow and president of the Women's Engineering Society.

== Early life and education ==
Isabel Helen Cox was born on 19 September 1919 at Streatham, London. She attended Furzedown Primary School and Streatham Secondary School (both London County Council schools). She was accepted into Newnham College, Cambridge, to read the Natural Science Tripos, where she specialised in physics, studying there from 1938 to 1941. In 1941, she joined Metropolitan‑Vickers Electrical Company Ltd (Metropolitan‑Vickers), Stretford, Manchester, completing an initial two-year college-apprenticeship course in engineering. In 1942, she joined the Institution of Electrical Engineers (IEE, now the Institution of Engineering and Technology) as an associate member. In 1945, she received her MA from Newnham, and on 23 February 1945, she was elected to a fellowship of the Physical Society of London, now the Institute of Physics, transferring from student membership. In the same year, she married John Norman Hardwich, who at the time, was working as an engineer in the High Voltage Research Laboratory at Metropolitan‑Vickers. He was an associate and supporter of the Women's Engineering Society, and he shared the burden of running the home to allow Isabel to continue working at Metropolitan‑Vickers.

== Career ==
After completion of her apprenticeship, Hardwich worked in the Research Department at Metropolitan‑Vickers, becoming one of the original members of the electron microscope team. After a year and a half of working on this project she shifted her focus and began building a photometric laboratory, however this was badly damaged in a fire. She then worked on a setting up a large Hilger ultraviolet spectrometer, then designing an X‑ray spectrometer. She became a member of the Illuminating Engineering Society in 1947, joined the society's Manchester Centre Committee in 1948, and served on both the education and papers sub‑committees. In 1950, she was elected a full member of the IEE.

By 1959, Hardwich was working with beryllium to find the optimum method of refining, melting, and welding it, for use in cans holding enriched uranium inside nuclear reactors. Like most of the staff, she lectured part‑time at the University of Manchester Institute of Science and Technology and the Royal College of Advanced Technology, Salford. In May 1960, she was given responsibility for the employment and training of the technical women within the company's research department. She took on the role following the retirement of Beryl May Dent as section leader for the women in the research department. Throughout her career she campaigned to educate, recruit, and support young women into the industry as professional engineers. She was the only woman engineer delegate at the IEE conference held in Belfast in May 1963. She played a key role in the first six International Conference of Women Engineers and Scientists, particularly in arranging the second conference held in Cambridge in 1967. At the end of that conference, she chaired a committee developed to ensure that a third ICWES conference would take place, its members included Ebun Oni, Mahin Rahmani, Dorothy Mizoguchi, Bilge Özgüner and Angelina Perez Lopez.

Hardwich was notable for her involvement in the Women's Engineering Society. She joined in 1941 and helped to set up its Manchester branch the year after, alongside her great friend motor engineer Elsie Eleanor Verity, and Dorothy Smith, a colleague at Metropolitan‑Vickers. Subsequently, she served as chairman for the session 1947 to 1948. As chairman, she gave the first talk organised by the Manchester branch in that year, an address entitled "Lighten Our Darkness", that introduced the theory of relativity. She was editor of the society's journal, The Woman Engineer, from 1952 to 1956. She went on to serve as the vice president of the society from 1956 to 1960 and as president from 1961 to 1962. She succeeded Madeleine Nobbs in the role and was succeeded in turn by Cicely Thompson. From 1966 to 1973, she was honorary secretary to the society. She was also elected a fellow of the Society of Women Engineers having been a member since 1962. Hardwich retired in 1979.

== Death and legacy ==
Hardwich died on 19 February 1987 at her home in Flixton, a suburb in Trafford, Greater Manchester. The funeral service and committal was held on 26 February 1987 at Manchester Crematorium. Her archive is held at the Institution of Engineering and Technology. The Women's Engineering Society has awarded the Isabel Hardwich medal, named in her honour, since 1987. This is given to a member who has made an outstanding and sustained contribution to the Society over a number of years and "gone above and beyond the call of duty". Past recipients include:

- 2023: Jo Douglas‑Harris
- 2022: Katherine Critchley (Note: Critchley was elected president of the Women's Engineering Society in October 2023.)
- 2021: Sally Sudworth
- 2020: Dawn Bonfield
- 2019: Petra Gratton
- 2018: Nina Baker
- 2017: Milada Williams and Linda Maynard
- 2016: Dawn Fitt and Jackie Longworth
- 2015: Carol Marsh and Anne Wiseman
- 2014: Alexandra Walker
- 2013: Grazyna Whapshott
- 2012: Jan Peters
- 2010: Pam Wain and Betty McCarthy
- 2007: Dorothy Hatfield
- 2005: Connie Shirley
- 2004: Michael Sanderson (Note: Former chief executive of the Science, Engineering and Manufacturing Technologies Alliance (SEMTA).)
- 2003: Sue Bird and Nicole Rockliff
- [Temporary cessation of the award from 1993 to 2002]
- 1992: Hilda Blount
- 1991: May Maple
- 1990: Cicely Thompson
- 1989: John Hardwich (Note: Hardwich's husband.)
- 1988: Elizabeth Laverick
- 1987: Sheila Waddell

== See also ==
- Electrical Association for Women
- Gertrude Lilian Entwisle
- Anne Gillespie Shaw
