= Maude Dickinson =

British inventor and scientist

- Born: Mary Lock; 1868 or 1869
- Died: 31 March 1933 (aged 63-65); Brighton, East Sussex, England
- Occupation(s): inventor, scientist

Maude Dickinson (1868 or 1869 - 31 March 1933) was a member of the Women's Engineering Society and a female scientist at the beginning of the 20th century who believed she had discovered organic radium crystals. She was proclaimed as "A High Priestess of Hygiene".

== Early life ==
Maude Dickinson was born Mary Lock in 1868 or 1869. Her father was Peter Lock, gentleman of Fareham. In 1885, she married John Oldridge Dicker, a solicitor and Freemason, of Camden Square, London.

In 1890, Mary filed for divorce from Dicker on the grounds of adultery and desertion by him. However, the decree nisi is rescinded and the divorce files show that Dicker counter-petitioned against Mary stating that she was cohabiting as wife to a Mr Thomas Gordon Dickinson, in Brighton, East Sussex.

== Experiments ==
Dickinson reputedly discovered radioactive crystals whilst mixing antiseptic creams and conducted many experiments to explore the versatility of the crystals. These experiments and their findings were detailed in a publication called a "A New Activity?" written by Frank Hotblack in 1920. The uses ranged from boiler and waterpipe descaling to being added to bread as a yeast substitute to elongate freshness. Fifty-six loaves of yeastless bread, were sent to Prisoners of War in Germany in 1915, “This bread keeps so very fresh that the men are able to enjoy it even after three weeks journey” and a loaf was even sent to the Queen (Mary) and a letter of thanks was received by Maude Dickinson.

== Career ==
Maude and Thomas Dickinson ran a company called Dongor Hygiene which manufactured antiseptic hygiene products reputed to contain radium crystals. The products included soaps, sprays and polishes. These were supplied to hospitals, cinemas and theatres. The company was awarded a Diploma and Silver Medal at the 17th International Congress of Medicine in 1913 and was reputed to be supplying products to over 500 organisations including the Red Cross Society.

== Death ==
Maude Dickinson/Mary Dicker died on 31 March 1933 at 51 Marine Parade, Brighton, leaving £428 15s and 5d. The codicil to her will states to “my dear friend Hastings White [Alfred George] of The Royal Society...and I bequeath to the said Hastings White, irrespective of his acceptance or rejection of such offices all tubes and contents, and crystals and scientific photographs in connection with my researches...together with the gold box with the ruby clasp containing such tubes and also my collection of scarabs should the British Museum be unwilling to accept the bequest thereof.” Alfred George Hastings White was librarian for the Royal Society.
