= Lynette Willoughby =

Electronic engineer

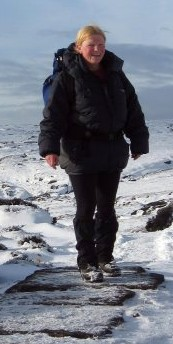
On Kinder Scout in 2009

Helen Lynette Estelle Willoughby (born 1949) is a feminist electronic engineer and champion of teaching women about technology, whose career has spanned 50 years. She was a lecturer on microprocessor engineering at Leeds Polytechnic and Leeds Beckett University for 24 years. She was the president of the Women's Engineering Society from 1993 to 1995.

== Early life ==
Lynette's family comes from Sheffield but she was born near Hull, and she had three older brothers. She grew up in London and went to a girls' grammar school where her talents for science were encouraged, and special arrangements were made to allow her to study physics at A-level. In 1968, she started her BSc degree at the University of Surrey in Electrical and Electronic Engineering, being the only woman on the course. At Surrey, in response to how many lecturers inadequately conveyed information, she developed her interest in teaching. She also became aware of how sexism could affect her aspirations as she was discouraged from applying for a job on the British Antarctic Survey because there were no toilet facilities for women. She had two technician jobs while studying. Following her degree, she researched the teaching of engineering for 2 years.

== Career in Electronics ==
Following her studies, Lynette became a science teacher at Foxwood School, Leeds. From 1977 to 1981, she worked as a medical physics technician at Leeds General Infirmary. In 1979, Lynette wrote to the New Scientist to complain about a sexist cartoon, pointing out how attitudes towards women affected their ability to partake in engineering careers.

In 1981, Lynette played a key role in setting up one of the first centers for training women in technology and other skills, the East Leeds Women's Workshop. The project was set up following the closure of Burton's Tailoring Firm in Harehills, Leeds, which left many women unemployed. It aimed to provide free training in areas where women did not traditionally work such as electronics, micro-computing, carpentry and joinery to allow women to gain skills for successful employment. Minority women, including disabilities and BAME, were given priority and childcare was provided. Lynette taught electronics and computing.

In 1984, Lynette contributed to a study on training for women in technology for the Manpower Services Commission.

In 1985-1986, Lynette studied for an MSc in Microprocessor Engineering at University of Bradford. She began her involvement with the Women's Engineering Society. After unsuccessfully applying for jobs in industry, Lynette became a lecturer at Leeds Polytechnic, later called Leeds Beckett University after a friend encouraged her to apply. She taught a range of subjects including computer hardware, professional skills for computing, and the political and social implications of technology. She also taught for the Open University between 1972 and 1993. From 1993 to 1995, she was president of the Women's Engineering Society. In 2000, Lynette was chosen to research and write a short paper on the global state of technology education for women. In 2001, she contributed to a research project exploring how to increase access for women to the internet. Lynette retired in 2005. She kept her links with Leeds Beckett University until 2012. In 2019, Lynette contributed to a project celebrating 100 years of the Women's Engineering Society at the University of Leeds.

== Career as an artist ==
From 1998 to 2004, Lynette took a Fine Art degree at the Leeds College of Art and Design. In 2006, she finally got to Antarctica where she took photographs of the wildlife. From 2009, Lynette has worked on many site-responsive projects in Leeds and Bradford including the Ghosts Group at the Leeds Industrial Museum at Armley Mills and ghost installations at Saltaire. She also makes artist's books. She is an active member of Leeds Creative Time Bank overseeing operations and responsible for treasurer, administrator and timebroker activities.
