= Women's Engineering Society =

British women's engineering organisation

- Abbreviation: WES
- Formation: 1919
- Legal status: Charity
- Location: Futures Place, Stevenage, Hertfordshire
- Coordinates: 51.896062°N 0.202365°W
- Region served: United Kingdom
- Fields: Engineering
- President: Katherine Critchley
- Board of directors: Katherine Critchley, Sarah Haslam, Chrisma Jain, Tosha Nembhard, Vince Pizzoni, Aniela Foster-Turner, Kate Willis, Alysha Ratansi, Laura Shrieves, Susan McDonald, Caitlin McCall, Judith Abolle.
- Key people: Susan Robson, interim Chief Executive Officer
- Main organ: The Woman Engineer
- Website: www.wes.org.uk

The Women's Engineering Society is a United Kingdom professional learned society and networking body for women engineers, scientists and technologists. It was the first professional body set up for women working in all areas of engineering, predating the Society of Women Engineers by around 30 years.

== History ==
The society was formed on 23 June 1919, after the First World War, during which many women had taken up roles in engineering to replace men who were involved in the military effort. While it had been seen as necessary to bring women into engineering to fill the gap left by men joining the armed forces, the government, employers, and trades unions were against the continuing employment of women after the war. The Restoration of Pre-War Practices Act 1919 gave soldiers returning from World War I their pre-war jobs back and meant many women could no longer work in roles they were employed to fill during the war.

This led a group of seven women, including Lady Katharine Parsons, her daughter Rachel Parsons, Lady Margaret Moir, Laura Annie Willson, Eleanor Shelley-Rolls, Janetta Mary Ornsby, and Margaret Rowbotham to form the Women's Engineering Society, with the aim of enabling women to gain training, jobs and acceptance in engineering fields. The Society's first Secretary was Caroline Haslett. From 1926 the Society had Theodora Llewelyn Davies as Honorary Legal Adviser, followed by Helena Normanton, two of the earliest women allowed to be barristers.

Early members in the 1920s and 1930s included Verena Holmes, Hilda Lyon and Margaret Partridge. Pilot and engineer, Amy Johnson, who was the first woman to fly solo from the United Kingdom to Australia, was a member of WES and served as president between 1935 and 1937. A registry of members from 1935 shows there were members from across the world, such as the United States of America, including sociologist and industrial engineer Lillian Gilbreth, and Germany, including Asta Hampe and Ilse Knot-ter Meer.

The Society celebrated its 95th year in 2014 with the launch of International Women in Engineering Day (INWED) on 23 June 2014. To this day the Society continues to organise INWED and set the annual theme. The Society celebrated its centenary in 2019 with the launch of the WES Centenary Trail, a project to highlight the historic stories of women engineers.

== Work and campaigns ==
Society members have advised the UK government on evolving employment practices for women. Constituted as a professional society with membership grades based on qualification and experience, the society promotes the study and practice of engineering and allied sciences among women.

WES is represented by groups. The work of the groups focuses on:

- support to members and women engineers in general,
- encouragement of women to study engineering and take up engineering careers,
- promotion of corporate gender diversity,
- speaking as the collective voice of women engineers.

The Woman Engineer
- Language: English

Publication details
- History: 1919–present
- Frequency: Quarterly

Standard abbreviations
- ISO 4: Woman Eng.

Indexing
- OCLC no.: 964861124

Links
- Journal homepage; Online access

The society produces the journal The Woman Engineer which was edited by Caroline Haslett in its early years. The journal contained technical articles in its early years but now gives a view of work in engineering disciplines and women's involvement in them. The digital archive of the journal is held by the Institution of Engineering and Technology.

The Women's Engineering Society holds an annual conference, a student conference and regional workshops and networking events.

=== Outreach to schools ===
In 1969, President Verena Holmes left a legacy to fund an annual lecture to inspire school girls. Run by the Verena Holmes Trust, the first lecture tour was in 1969 during the first UK Women in Engineering Year. It was delivered at various venues to children aged nine to eleven to encourage their interest in engineering, The lectures were given by leading engineers with Mary Kendrick giving the lecture in 1981.

Members provided the 'technical women power' for the Women in Science and Engineering (WISE) buses that were launched following the WISE Year in 1984, an initiative that continued into the 1990s.

In 2014 WES set up an outreach programme called Magnificent Women (and their flying machines) which replicates the work that women did during the First World War in making aircraft wings, and this was aimed at secondary school girls. The programme was discontinued in 2018 as the Society refocused its campaigns on supporting the engineering industry to be more inclusive.

=== MentorSET ===
MentorSET is a mentoring scheme for engineers, inspired by the WES President Petra Gratton (née Godwin) in 2000. The scheme was a collaborative project with national network of women scientists (AWISE). It was a mentoring scheme to help women in their career and to support them back into engineering after a career break. MentorSET has been funded by DTI, the UK Resource Centre for Women in SET, and BAE Systems. In 2015 the MentorSET programme was relaunched with funding from DECC, now BEIS and Women in Nuclear and is now relevant to women working in science and technology as well as engineering.

== Membership ==
Members are drawn from women who have entered the profession through routes varying from traditional apprenticeship to higher education leading to graduate and further degrees. The participation of male engineers in the society is encouraged.

Current membership includes 2,164 members and over 120 corporate and education partners. Approximately half of members are individual members, including those self-funding, students, and apprentices in the field of engineering.

== Governance ==
The Women's Engineering Society is a charitable company, governed by the president and the Board of Directors of the Company, who are also Trustees of the Charity. Day-to-day operations are delegated to the chief executive officer and staff.

== Presidents ==
- 1919–1921 Rachel Parsons
- 1922–1925 Katharine, Lady Parsons
- 1926–1928 Laura Annie Willson
- 1929–1930 Margaret, Lady Moir
- 1931–1932 Verena Holmes
- 1933–1934 Elizabeth Kennedy
- 1935–1937 Amy Johnson
- 1938–1939 Edith Mary Douglas
- 1940–1941 Dame Caroline Haslett
- 1942–1943 Gertrude Lilian Entwisle
- 1944–1945 Margaret Partridge
- 1946–1947 Winifred Hackett
- 1948–1949 Frances Heywood
- 1950–1951 Sheila Leather
- 1952–1953 Ella Mary Collin
- 1954–1955 Dorothy Pile
- 1955–1956 Kathleen Mary Cook
- 1957–1958 Marjorie Bell
- 1959–1960 Madeleine Nobbs
- 1961–1962 Isabel Hardwich
- 1963 Cicely Thompson
- 1964 Dorothy Cridland
- 1965 Cicely Thompson
- 1966–1967 Rose Winslade
- 1968–1969 Elizabeth Laverick
- 1970–1971 May Maple
- 1972–1973 Peggy Hodges
- 1974–1975 Gwendolen Sergant
- 1976–1977 Henrietta Bussell
- 1978–1979 Veronica Milligan
- 1980–1981 Maria Watkins
- 1982–1983 Rosemary West
- 1983–1985 Daphne Jackson
- 1985–1987 Linda Maynard
- 1987–1989 Hilda Blount
- 1989–1991 Dorothy Hatfield
- 1991–1993 Sue Bird
- 1993–1995 Lynette Willoughby
- 1995–1997 Mary Harris / Sue Bird
- 1997–1998 Philippa Ayton
- 1998 Petra Godwin
- 1999 Suzanne Flynn
- 2000 Nicole Rockliff
- 2001 Jackie Longworth
- 2002 Jackie Carpenter
- 2003–2004 Pam Wain
- 2005–2006 Dawn Fitt
- 2007 Grazyna Whapshott
- 2008–2010 Jan Peters
- 2011–2013 Milada Williams
- 2013–2014 Carol Marsh
- 2014–2015 Dawn Bonfield
- 2015–2018 Benita Mehra
- 2018–2023 Dame Dawn Childs
- 2023-present Dr Katherine Critchley

== Notable historical members ==
- Annette Ashberry
- Ethel H. Bailey
- Mary Bailey (aviator)
- Cleone Benest
- Florence Blenkiron
- Gabrielle Borthwick
- Frances Bradfield
- M. A. Cloudesley Brereton
- Dorothy Donaldson Buchanan
- Karen Burt
- Kathleen M. Butler
- Mrs Pender Chalmers
- Anne Chamney
- Letitia Chitty
- Annie Pearson, Viscountess Cowdray
- Evelyn May Cridlan
- Iris Cummins
- Elsie Joy Davison
- Elsie Louisa Deacon
- Olive Dennis
- Beryl May Dent
- Maude Dickinson
- Jeanie Dicks
- Mary E. Dillon
- Victoria Drummond
- Elsie Eaves
- Joy Ferguson
- Mary Fergusson
- M. Elsa Gardner
- Ella Hudson Gasking
- Elizabeth Georgeson
- Lillian Moller Gilbreth
- Pauline Gower
- Miriam Violet Griffith
- Helen Grimshaw
- Asta Hampe
- Verena Holmes
- Betty Johnson (physicist)
- Ilse Knott-ter Meer
- Mary Kendrick
- Ayyalasomayajula Lalitha
- Theodora Llewelyn Davies
- Betty Lindsay
- Kathleen Lonsdale
- Hilda Lyon
- Marguerite Massart
- Mabel Lucy Matthews
- Monica Maurice
- Mary Maxwell-Channell
- Zella McBerty
- Sheila McGuffie
- Florence Violet McKenzie
- Maxine Blossom Miles
- Miriam Muwanga
- Ruth Rowland Nichols
- Madeleine Nobbs
- Helena Normanton
- Janetta Mary Ornsby
- Claudia Parsons
- Margaret Partridge
- Gabrielle Patterson
- Winifred Pink
- Beryl Platt, Baroness Platt of Writtle
- Cicely Popplewell
- Dorothée Pullinger
- Ira Rischowski
- Margaret Dorothea Rowbotham
- Dorothy Rowntree
- Evelyn Roxburgh
- Ruth Shafer
- Anne Gillespie Shaw
- Eleanor Shelley-Rolls
- Beatrice Shilling
- Premala Sivaprakasapillai Sivasegaram
- Lesley Souter
- Dorothy Smith (1898-1975)
- Dorothy Spicer
- Edith Anne Stoney
- Florence Stoney
- Blanche Thornycroft
- Constance Tipper
- Elsie Eleanor Verity
- Theresa Wallach
- Maria Watkins

== See also ==
- History of women in engineering in the United Kingdom
- Atalanta Ltd
- Electrical Association for Women
