= Zella McBerty =

Businesswoman and engineer in electric welding machine production

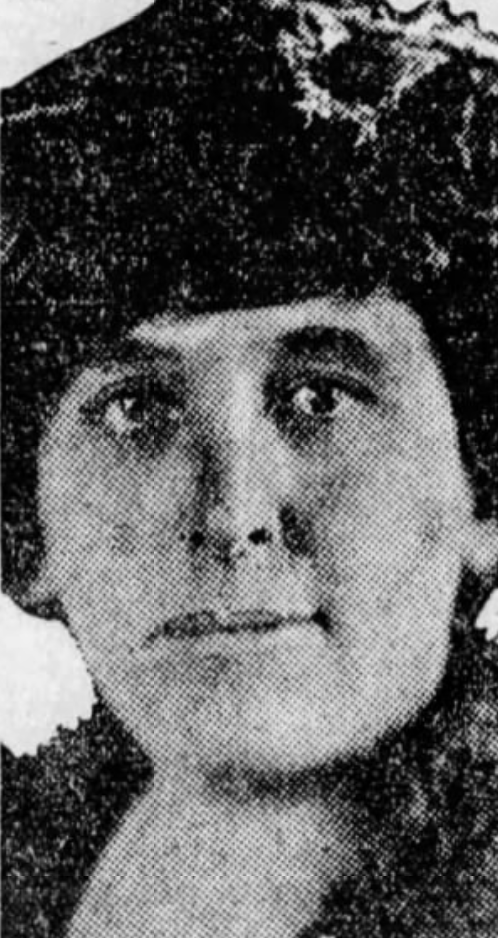
- Zella McBerty, from a 1923 newspaper
- Born: Zella Helwick; 1879; Mineral Ridge, Ohio, US
- Died: 24 May 1937 (aged 57–58); Ohio, US

Zella McBerty (née Helwick; 1879 – 24 May 1937), was an American businesswoman and engineer, a “better mechanic than any of the other men that she worked with” at Packard Electric.

== Early life ==
Born Zella Helwick in 1879 to a couple from Mineral Ridge, Ohio who died shortly after her birth, she later moved to Warren, Ohio where she married Fred McBerty. They met while working for Packard Electric.

== Career ==
Together the couple bought 'The Federal Machine and Welder Company'. McBerty held the position of chief financial officer of the company and represented it internationally at conferences. In 1923 article the New Castle (Pa.) Herald, commented that “when you hear Mrs. McBerty talk ohms and amperes as well as any electrical engineer, there’s hardly a business realm that a capable woman cannot invade.”

She was the first woman to attend the International Association of Electric Welders conference, which she did when it was held in London in 1924. McBerty was the president of the local Business and Professional Women's Club and an international member of the Women's Engineering Society.

McBerty was also one of very few women to be members of the American Institute of Electrical Engineers.

She died of a heart attack on 24 May 1937 at the age of 58.
