= Mary Maxwell-Channell =

British engineer

Mary Maxwell-Channell MBE
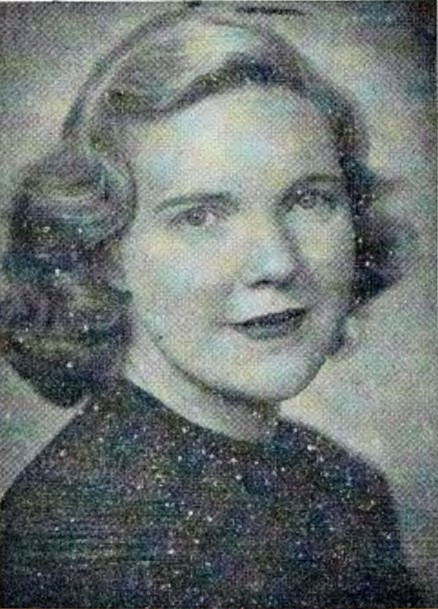
- Born: Mary Gardner; 23 July 1914; Lancashire
- Died: 18 December 2012 (aged 98); Bude, Cornwall
- Other names: Mary Channell de Chanel

Mary Maxwell-Channell MBE (23 July 1914 - 18 Dec 2012) was an engineer and businesswoman who was honoured in the 1946 New Years Honours list for her role in starting a factory producing munitions in World War II.

== Early life and education ==
Mary Gardner was born in rural Lancashire, England on 23 July 1914. Her parents were Thomas Gardner and Bertha May Foxcroft, and she had seven brothers and sisters. They lived in Cockerham near Garstang.

Mary studied engineering, probably at one of the London polytechnics such as Borough Polytechnic Institute which ran women's engineering courses organised by Women's Engineering Society (WES) from 1930.

== Career ==
The most prominent engineering enterprise of Mary Maxwell-Channell was the company Erinex which carried out wartime work in World War II. Erinex was based in the village of Flore, Northamptonshire, initially in existing village buildings, and employed mainly women. The citation under "New Members" in 1943 in the Women's Engineering Society journal The Woman Engineer said that Erinex & Co was carrying out laboratory work on metal substitution, airscrew and spinner development, plastic development and in general engineering. Later sources mention high velocity incendiary bombs. The continued story of Erinex Ltd, is described in The Woman Engineer in 1947, including the company's purchase of an autogyro. A photograph of the factory from January 1946 shows women assembling electric kettles.

For her work founding a war industry at Erinex she was appointed as a Member of the Order of the British Empire in the New Years Honours of 1946.

Erinex Ltd and two other companies owned by Maxwell-Channell were wound up during 1948-1950 amid charges of fraudulent conversion of company money by her husband, Robert Maxwell-Channell.

Maxwell-Channell joined the Women's Engineering Society (WES) in 1943 and became a Member of Council 1947-1948.

== Personal life ==
Mary Gardener married Australian engineer Robert Maxwell-Channell on 3 June 1937 at Warwick and Leamington Register Office. In later life Mary and her husband used the surname Channell de Chanel.

Mary Maxwell-Channel de Chanell died in Bude, Cornwall in 2012.

A selection of her papers were deposited in the Institution of Engineering and Technology Archives in the early 2020s as part of the Women's Engineering Society's collection.
