= Sue Bird (engineer) =

British acoustic engineer

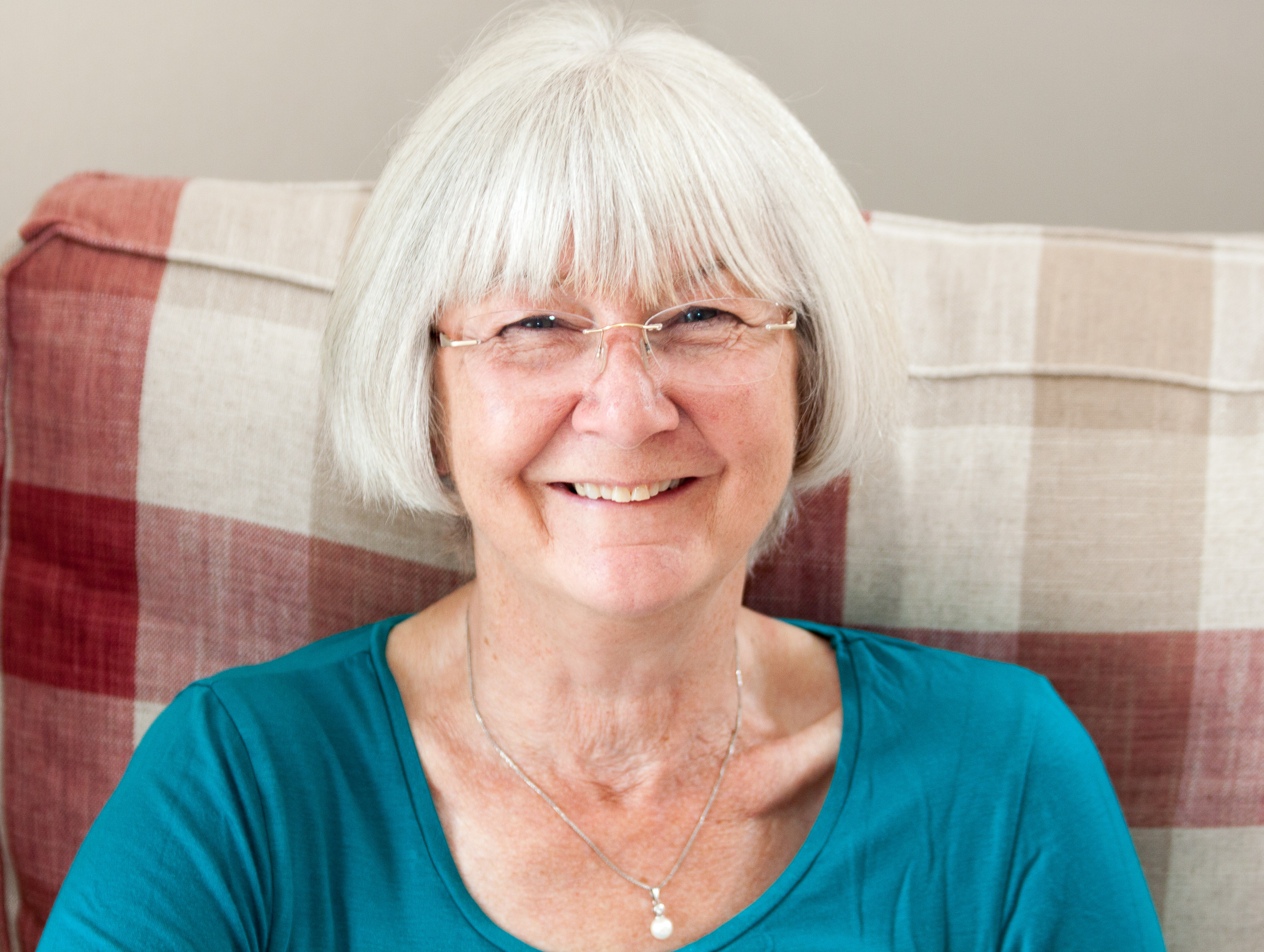

Susan Bird is a British acoustic engineer and past president of Women's Engineering Society (WES) (1991–1993, 1996–1997).

== Education and career ==
Bird studied Applied Physics at Coventry Polytechnic, then worked at the British Aircraft Corporation as an acoustics engineer for Concorde, and other aircraft, then joined the Scientific Branch in the Greater London Council as an acoustic consultant specialising mainly in building acoustics. On the demise of the GLC in 1986 she formed her own company, Bird Acoustics, and was joined in 1993 by her husband, also an acoustics engineer. This was a consultancy specialising in acoustics and noise control where she stayed until her retirement in 2008. She gained an MSc in Applied Acoustics from Derby University in 2003. She is a Chartered Engineer and a Fellow of the Institute of Acoustics and has been both chair and President of the Association of Noise Consultants.

In 1993 Bird was a member of the Working Group on ‘Women in Science Technology and Engineering’ for Office of Science & Technology which produced the report ‘The Rising Tide’. In 2002, representing WES, she was instrumental in setting up the International Network of Women Engineers and Scientists (INWES), and was INWES president from 2008 to 2011.

Bird was a governor at Welbeck Defence Sixth Form College for 25 years and is now a Parish Councillor.

== Awards ==
Bird was awarded the Isabel Hardwich Medal of the Women's Engineering Society in 2003 and an MBE for services to women in engineering in 2016.
