= Helen Grimshaw =

British aeronautical engineer and pioneering G-force-pressure suit designer

- Retirement Presentation with a model figure dressed in the pressure suit Grimshaw designed
- Born: 6 August 1904; Hanover Square
- Died: 16 December 1987 (aged 83); Surrey

Helen Grimshaw OBE (6 August 1904 – 16 December 1987) was a British aeronautical engineer and pioneering G-force-pressure suit designer.

== Early life and education ==
Helen Grimshaw was born in Hanover Square, London, but grew up in Surrey. Grimshaw was the daughter of a civil engineer and educated at the Francis Holland School. She attended the University of London in 1924, where she studied civil engineering, graduating in 1930 with a BSc (Special) Engineering. She was the first woman to apply to and join the Institution of Civil Engineers as a student on 13 January 1925 and became an associate member the following year. Grimshaw graduated from University College London in 1930 with a BSc (Special) Engineering and returned for another year to get practical training in the engineering workshops. She completed her PhD there in 1936.

== Career ==
Grimshaw spent her career working at the Royal Aircraft Establishment (RAE) Farnborough. She joined them in 1937 in the instrumentation department working on de-icing equipment, oxygen equipment, pressure suits and the flight testing of instruments and other safety equipment. She worked on the team to achieve the world altitude record with Flight Lieutenant M.J. Adam in the Bristol Type 138. Grimshaw took over the flight test programme in 1941. The team worked on parachute development. She worked on manuals for the safe use of gliders. She was offered the opportunity of flying lessons and in 1947 she made a solo flight in a twin-engined Oxford.

Grimshaw spent 1953–61 at the RAE's headquarters office and returned as the RAE Project officer on the full pressure suit in 1961. The suits were intended to allow pilots to withstand the effects of gravity caused by the speed of the planes and the altitudes they traveled at. Grimshaw was later manager of the Personal Equipment Assembly Section in the Human Engineering Division. She retired in 1969.

== Recognition ==
Grimshaw was given the RAeSoc Wakefield Gold Medal "for her outstanding work over many years on human engineering problems" in 1966 and then an OBE in 1969. She was appointed as the Research Liaison Officer to work with the new British Standards panel reviewing the field of protective clothing in 1968.

In addition to her work in Farnborough, Grimshaw was a member of the Women's Engineering Society for all her working life. She died in a nursing home in Surrey in 1987.
