= Mary Kendrick =

British tidal engineer (1928–2015)

- Born: Mary Patricia Boak; 2 May 1928; Nottingham
- Died: 8 June 2015 (aged 87); Henley-on-Thames
- Education: University of Cambridge
- Occupation: Engineer
- Employer: Hydraulics Research Station at Wallingford.
- Known for: understanding river silt (e.g. Thames Barrier)
- Spouse: Les Kendrick

Mary Patricia Kendrick MBE born Mary Patricia Boak (2 May 1928 – 8 June 2015) was a British tidal engineer who was an expert on silt. She worked on many projects but she is known for leading a team working on the Thames Barrier. She broke a 200 year long list of Admirals who looked after keeping the River Mersey navigable when she appointed Acting Conservator of the River Mersey - a role that dates back to 1625.

== Life ==
Kendrick was born in Nottingham in 1928. Her parents were Dorothy Ellen and Charles Manley Boak. Her father was a haulage contractor and they lived at 19 Curzon Street in Nottingham. In 1951 she graduated with a double first from Cambridge University in English and Geography.

Her first job was at the UK government's Hydraulics Research Station (HRS) at Wallingford. She modestly applied for a job as a secretary and it was the interviewer who decided she should be an Assistant Experimental Officer. Her first task was to study the increasing silt building up in the River Mersey.

In 1964 she was the only female senior manager at the Hydraulic Research Station where she had a team of ten people (all men). That year she won the Telford Medal given annually by the Institution of Civil Engineers for the paper ‘Field and model investigations into the reasons for siltation in the Mersey estuary’, co-authored in 1963 with her colleague (William) Alan Price and published in the Proceedings of the Institution of Civil Engineers. She was the first woman to be given this honour.

In 1968 hydraulic studies were funded to understand how a barrier across the River Thames would affect the levels of the river and change the movement of silt, although at that time no particular site had been chosen. Kendrick was asked to lead the project, and credited for having had the idea of protecting London following the tidal surge of 1953, which killed 307 people. The research led to the creation of stations to monitor the measure and the studies were not complete until 1981.

During the 1980s the HRS won a contract to do work to support a Mersey barrage. Kendrick was asked to lead this work. She retired in 1988 but the work did not end. For two hundred years Admirals would be appointed to the position of the Acting Conservator of the River Mersey. Kendrick was to break this run when she became the acting conservator in 1988. It was her responsibility to keep the Mersey navigable for the port of Liverpool. She held that job for ten years.

In 1983 she gave the Verena Holmes Lecture of the Women's Engineering Society concerning her work, having joined the organisation in the early 1970s. (She repeated the talk in Madrid at the International Symposium on El Paisaje del Agua in 1986).

Kendrick died in Henley-on-Thames in 2015.

== Private life ==
Kendrick married Les Kendrick in 1951.
