= Caroline Haslett =

British electrical engineer, industrialist and editor (1895–1957)

Dame Caroline Haslett DBE
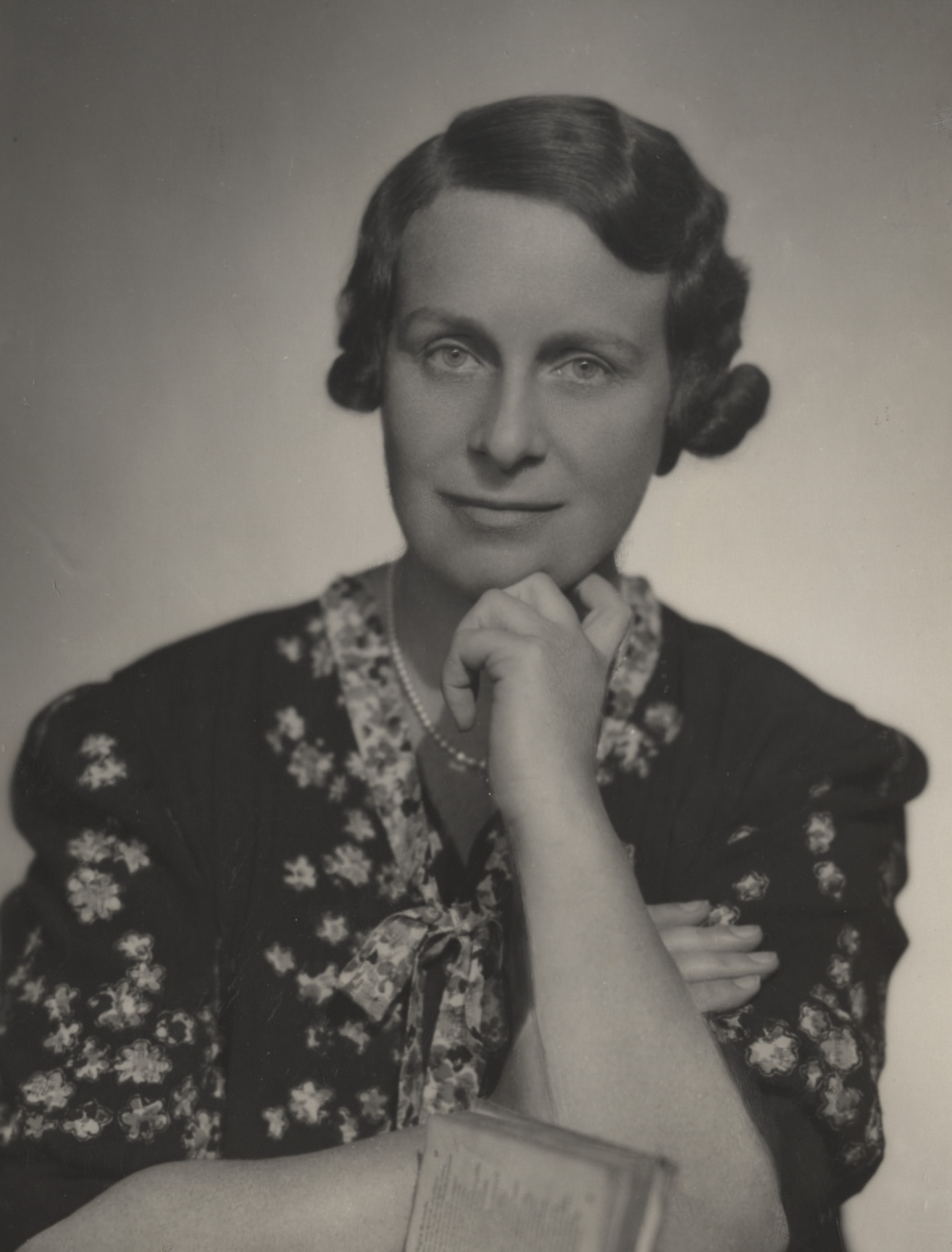
- Haslett c. 1925
- Born: Caroline Harriet Haslett; 17 August 1895; Worth, Sussex, England
- Died: 4 January 1957 (aged 61); Bungay, Suffolk, England
- Occupations: Electrical engineer; business woman; educator
- Known for: Feminism; electrifying the home to liberate women from domestic drudgery. She was a leading professional woman of her age.
- Title: Dame Commander of the Order of the British Empire

Dame Caroline Harriet Haslett DBE, JP (17 August 1895 – 4 January 1957) was an English electrical engineer, electricity industry administrator and champion of women's rights. Haslett was the first secretary of the Women's Engineering Society and the founder and editor of its journal, The Woman Engineer. She was co-founder, alongside Laura Annie Willson and with the support of Margaret, Lady Moir, of the Electrical Association for Women, which pioneered such 'wonders', as they were described in contemporary magazines, as the All-Electric House in Bristol in 1935.

Haslett became the first director of the Electrical Association for Women in 1925. Her chief interest was in harnessing the benefits of electrical power to emancipate women from the drudgery of household chores, so that they could pursue their own ambitions outside the home. In the early 1920s, few houses had electric light or heating, let alone electrical appliances; the National Grid was not yet in existence.

'Way is being made by electricity for a higher order of women – women set free from drudgery, who have time for reflection; for self-respect. We are coming to an age when the spiritual and higher state of life will have freer development, and this is only possible when women are liberated from soul-destroying drudgery ... I want [every woman] to have leisure to acquaint herself more profoundly with the topics of the day.'

— Caroline Haslett

== Early life ==
Born in Worth (now part of Crawley, West Sussex), on 17 August 1895, Caroline Haslett was the eldest daughter of Robert Haslett, a railway signal fitter and activist for the co-operative movement, and his wife, Caroline Sarah, formerly Holmes. After attending school in Haywards Heath, she undertook a business secretarial course in London, where she also joined the Suffragette movement. Through a contact of her mother's she took up employment with the Cochran boiler Company as a clerk and joined the Women's Social and Political Union (WSPU). Transferring to the Cochran workshops during World War I she acquired basic engineering training in London and in Annan, Dumfriesshire; from that time she became a pioneer for women in the electrical and professional world.

== Career ==
In 1919 Haslett left Cochran's to become the first secretary of the Women's Engineering Society (WES) and first editor of The Woman Engineer magazine, which she continued to edit until 1932.

In June 1920 she helped to found Atalanta Ltd, an engineering firm for women.

In 1924 she was approached by Mrs Mabel Lucy Matthews about an idea she had to popularise the domestic use of electricity to lighten the burden on women. The Institution of Electrical Engineers and the Electrical Development Association had turned the proposal down, but Haslett saw its possibilities. She was very enthused by the concept and persuaded Lady Katharine Parsons, then president of WES, to host a meeting to discuss it.

In November 1924 she co-founded and became the first director of the Electrical Association for Women, of which she remained a director until 1956, when she was obliged to retire because of ill health; from 1924 to 1956 she edited The Electrical Age, the EAW's journal.

Haslett was a member of the Women's Provisional Club for Professional and Businesswomen (founded in 1924) alongside architect Gertrude Leverkus, Eleanor Rathbone, Dr Louisa Martindale and Lady Rhondda. She was also an executive member of the Six Point Group, founded by Lady Rhondda in 1921, to press for changes in the law of the United Kingdom on six points of equality for women: political, occupational, moral, social, economic and legal.

In 1925 the Women's Engineering Society came to national attention when it organised a special conference at Wembley, in association with the First International Conference of Women in Science, Industry and Commerce. The conference was opened by the Duchess of York (later Queen Elizabeth the Queen Mother) and was chaired by Nancy, Lady Astor, the first woman to take her seat in the House of Commons. This event also introduced Caroline Haslett to a wider public. She remained secretary of WES until 1929, when she became honorary secretary, and she was the society's president from 1940 to 1941 (succeeding shipyard director Edith Mary Douglas, and succeeded by electrical engineer Gertrude Entwistle).

Haslett was the sole British woman delegate to the World Power Conference in Berlin in 1930 and only woman of any nationality to speak at the event. She represented Britain at later power conferences.

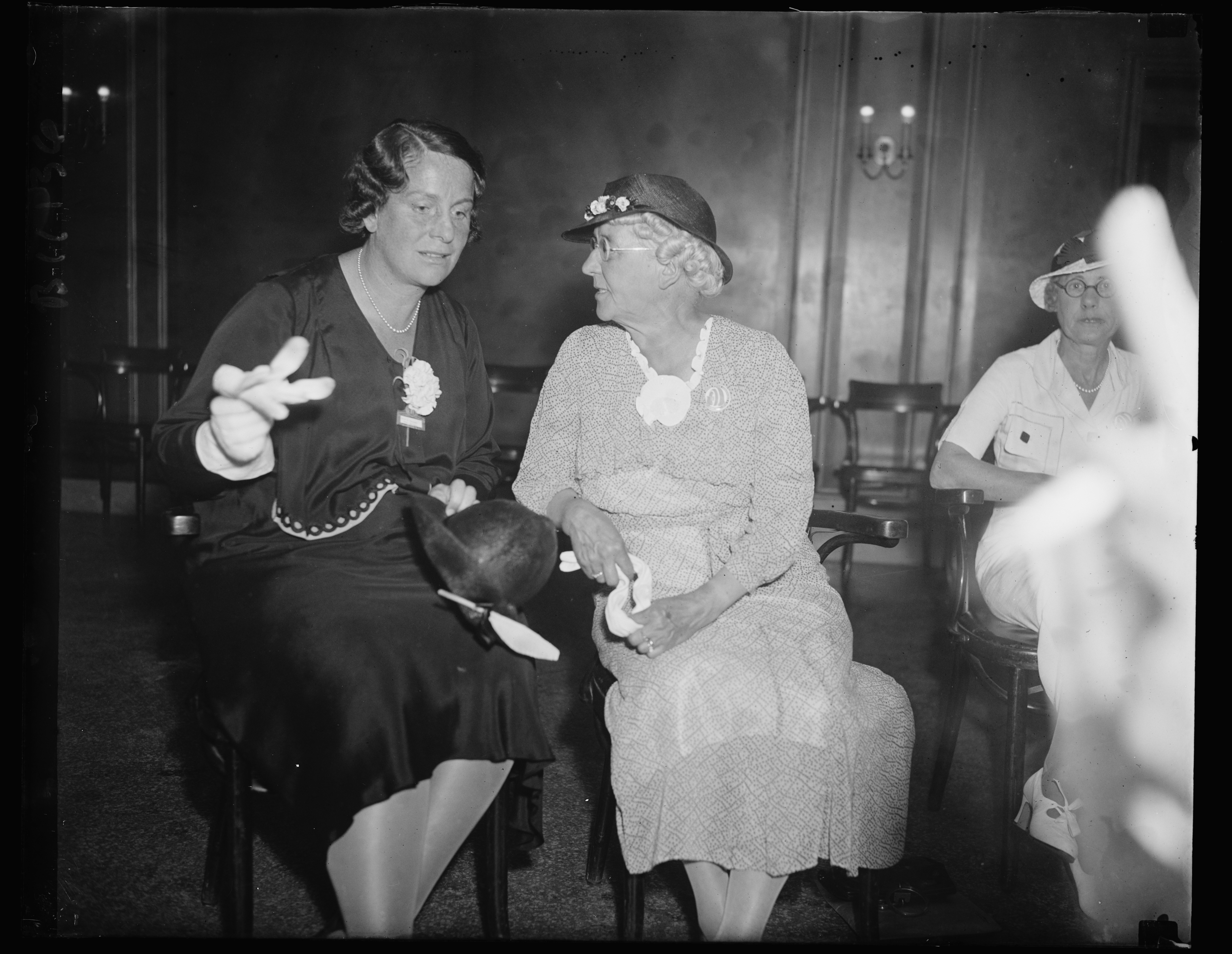
Caroline Haslett and Mrs. Gertrude de Ferranti, the only two women to represent organisations at the third World Power Conference in Washington, D.C., 8 September 1936.

During the next 20 years her public activities were extraordinary, as described by her friend Margaret Partridge, electrical engineer and another president of WES: 'She was a member of council of the British Institute of Management 1946–54, of the Industrial Welfare Society, of the National Industrial Alliance, of the Administrative Staff College, and of King's College of Household and Social Science; a governor of the London School of Economics, of Queen Elizabeth College, and of Bedford College for Women; a member of the Central Committee on Women's Training and Employment; a member of council and vice-president of the Royal Society of Arts 1941–55; and president of the British Federation of Business and Professional Women.

She was a member of the Women's Consultative Committee and the Advisory Council of the Appointments Department, Ministry of Labour; a member of the Correspondence Committee on Women's Work of the International Labour Office; and the first woman to be made a Companion of the Institution of Electrical Engineers (IEE)', Haslett was also involved in wider discussions on planning and the built environment, contributing to journals such as Town & Country Planning, for example in 1937 when she wrote that ‘Lack of planning has resulted in the present chaotic condition of our cities and the threatened desecration of our countryside. … The location of industrial sites and the economic distribution of population is a problem so complex that the multitude of apparent solutions appear to counterbalance each other.’

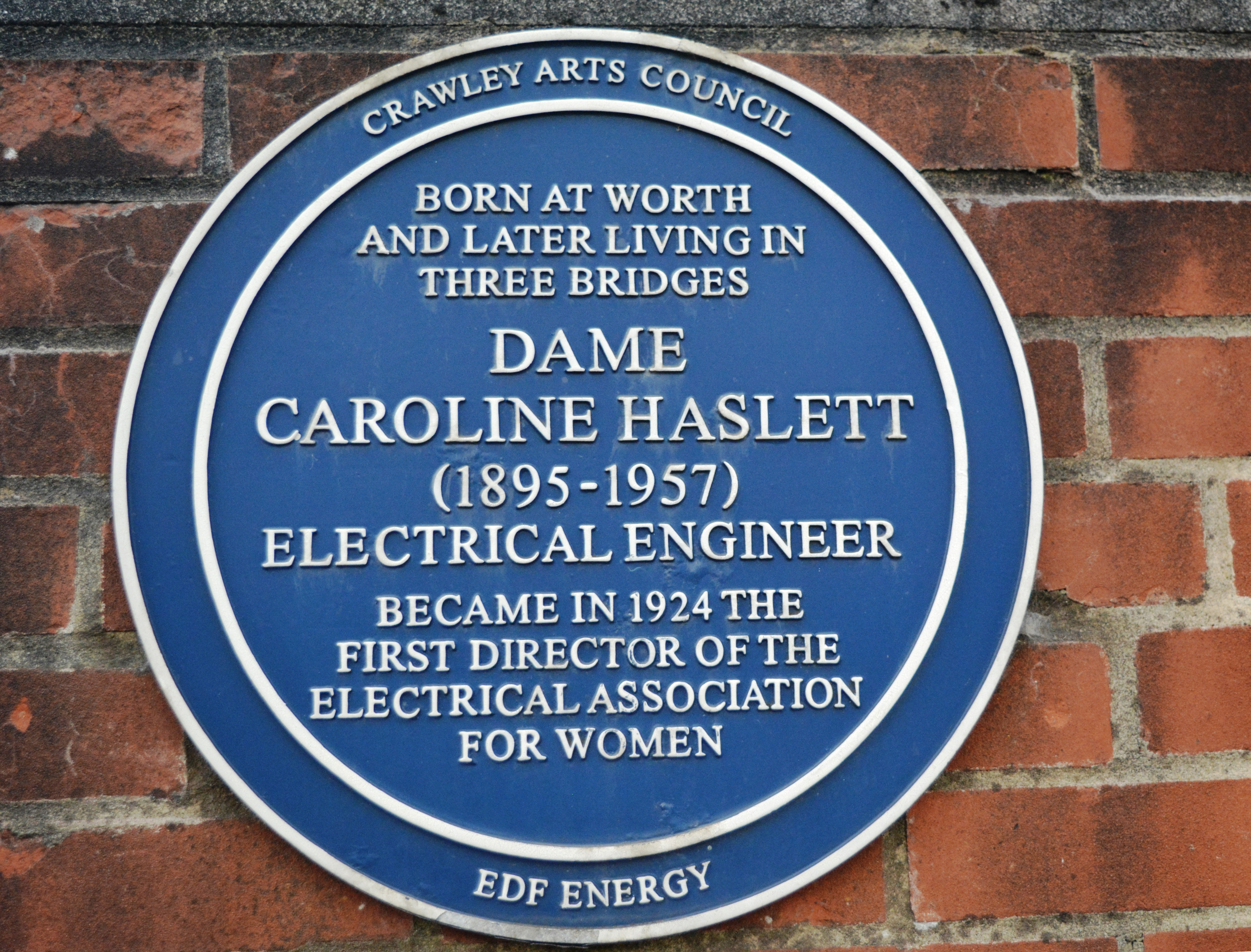
Plaque commemorating the life of Caroline Haslett in Haslett Avenue East, Three Bridges, Crawley, West Sussex

In 1932 the National Safety First Association (the forerunner of the Royal Society for the Prevention of Accidents) extended its activities to home safety, and Caroline Haslett was appointed as chair of the Home Safety Committee, a post she held until 1936. She became the first woman vice-president of the association in 1937.

In March 1940, the Woman Power Committee was created, from conversations between by Haslett and Lady Astor, with the intention of creating an organisation which had protecting the interests of British women during the war at it core. Until that point the government's labour policy for women had been weak and discriminatory over equal rights and pay. Women MPs from across the political parties backed the development of the organisation, although there were later complications around the involvement of Unions.

During the Second World War she was the only woman member (and the only safety expert) on the 20-person committee convened by the IEE to examine the requirements for electrical installations in post-war Britain, part of a larger scheme of Post-War Building Studies. An important part of those recommendations was a new plug and socket standard, the first requirement for which was To ensure the safety of young children it is of considerable importance that the contacts of the socket-outlet should be protected by shutters or other like means, or by the inherent design of the socket outlet. The result was BS 1363. The report also recommended the ring circuit system, which would become standard.

Haslett became vice-president of the International Federation of Business and Professional Women in 1936 and president of the organisation in 1950; and she was the first woman to chair a government working party – the Board of Trade's Hosiery Industry Working Party 1945–46. For many years she was a member of the Royal Institute of International Affairs and the Royal Institution. She was appointed to Crawley New Town Development Corporation 1947–56 a member of the working group developing a master Plan for Crawley alongside Sir Thomas Penberthy Bennett, Lawrence Neal, Alwyn Sheppard Fidler, Sir Edward Gillett, Eric Walter Pasold, Alderman James Marshall and Ivy Molly Bolton.

Haslett served as vice-president (1948) and first female chairman (1953–54) of the British Electrical Development Association. She represented the UK government on business missions in the US, Canada and Scandinavia, and after the Second World War she took a leading role in conferences organised for women in Germany by the British and American authorities.

Haslett was an effective networker and used invitations to lunch as a starting point for many useful working relationships. This included Maie Casey, artist and patron of the Australian Women’s Pilot Association, who was married to Richard G Casey, Governor-General of Australia. Haslett threw a lunch in her honour at the Forum Club in 1942.

In Margaret Partridge's view, the crowning achievement of Haslett's multifaceted career occurred in 1947, when she was appointed a member of the British Electricity Authority (BEA), later the Central Electricity Authority, which was formed to run the industry under national ownership. In 1949 the BEA named one of the ships in its collier fleet Dame Caroline Haslett in honour of its first woman member. Haslett took a personal interest in the collier and its crew and her photograph hung in the officers' mess. For her Christmas card in 1952 she commissioned a drawing of the ship lying at the wharf off Battersea Power Station by Mrs JP Gibson whose drawing was so good that it was remarked that 'you could almost smell the mud!'. The BEA set up the Caroline Haslett Trust to provide scholarships and travelling fellowships for its members. On 12 December 1952, Haslett wrote to the editor of The Times on the subject of the Great Smog (5–9 December 1952) extolling the benefits of an all-electric house over the visible pollutants caused by burning coal in the home.

== Publications ==
Caroline Haslett's publications include:

- The Electrical Handbook for Women (1934);
- Teach Yourself Household Electricity (in collaboration with E. E. Edwards, 1939);
- Munitions Girl, A Handbook for the Women of the Industrial Army (1942);
- Problems Have No Sex (1949).

She edited The EAW Electrical Handbook for the Electrical Association for Women, first published in 1934, which went into seven editions by 1961. She was also the author of numerous journal articles and conference papers.

In 1908, she wrote an autobiographical essay for the book "Myself When Young" which also featured essays by Sylvia Pankhurst and Maude Royden.

== Honours ==
In recognition of Haslett's services to women she was made a Commander of the Order of the British Empire in 1931, and in 1947, in recognition of her work for the Board of Trade and the Ministry of Labour, she was created a Dame Commander of the Order of the British Empire. She was elected a Companion of the Institution of Electrical Engineers (IEE) in 1932.

In 1934, her portrait was painted by Dorothy E. Vicaji, and presented to the EAW on 12 February by Margaret, Lady Moir.

In 1945, Haslett's portrait was created by Ethel Léontine Gabain as part of a series commissioned by the War Artists Advisory Committee, it is now held by the Imperial War Museum.

The National Portrait Gallery hold 7 portraits of Haslett, including a 1949 oil by Sir Gerald Kelly, put on display in Room 28 on Floor 2 in the 2023 redisplay.

From 1950 until her death she was a Justice of the Peace for the County of London.

== Final years ==
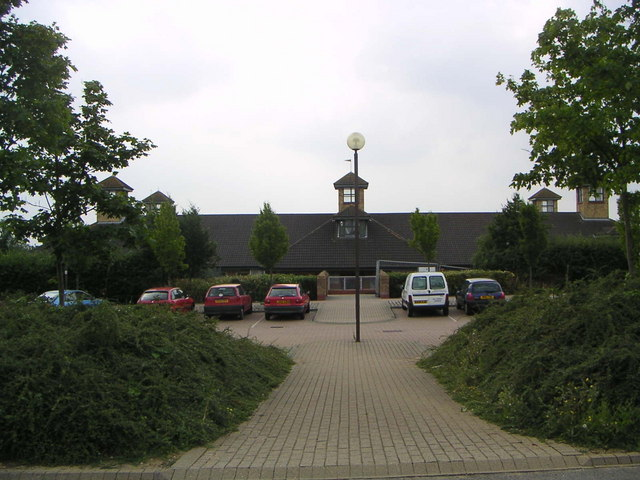
Caroline Haslett Combined School

She retired to live at the home of her sister (and biographer), Mrs Rosalind Lilian Messenger (1902-1990), at Bungay, in Suffolk, where she died from a coronary thrombosis on 4 January 1957, aged 61.

She never married but had a longterm relationship with F. S. Button of the National Union of Railwaymen. In her will she requested that her body be cremated by electricity. This is understood to have been carried out at the City of London Crematorium. On 25 January 1957, a memorial service was held in her memory at St Martins in the Field. Norah Balls of the EAW read the lesson, with an address by Lord Citrine of the Central Electricity Authority.

== Commemoration ==
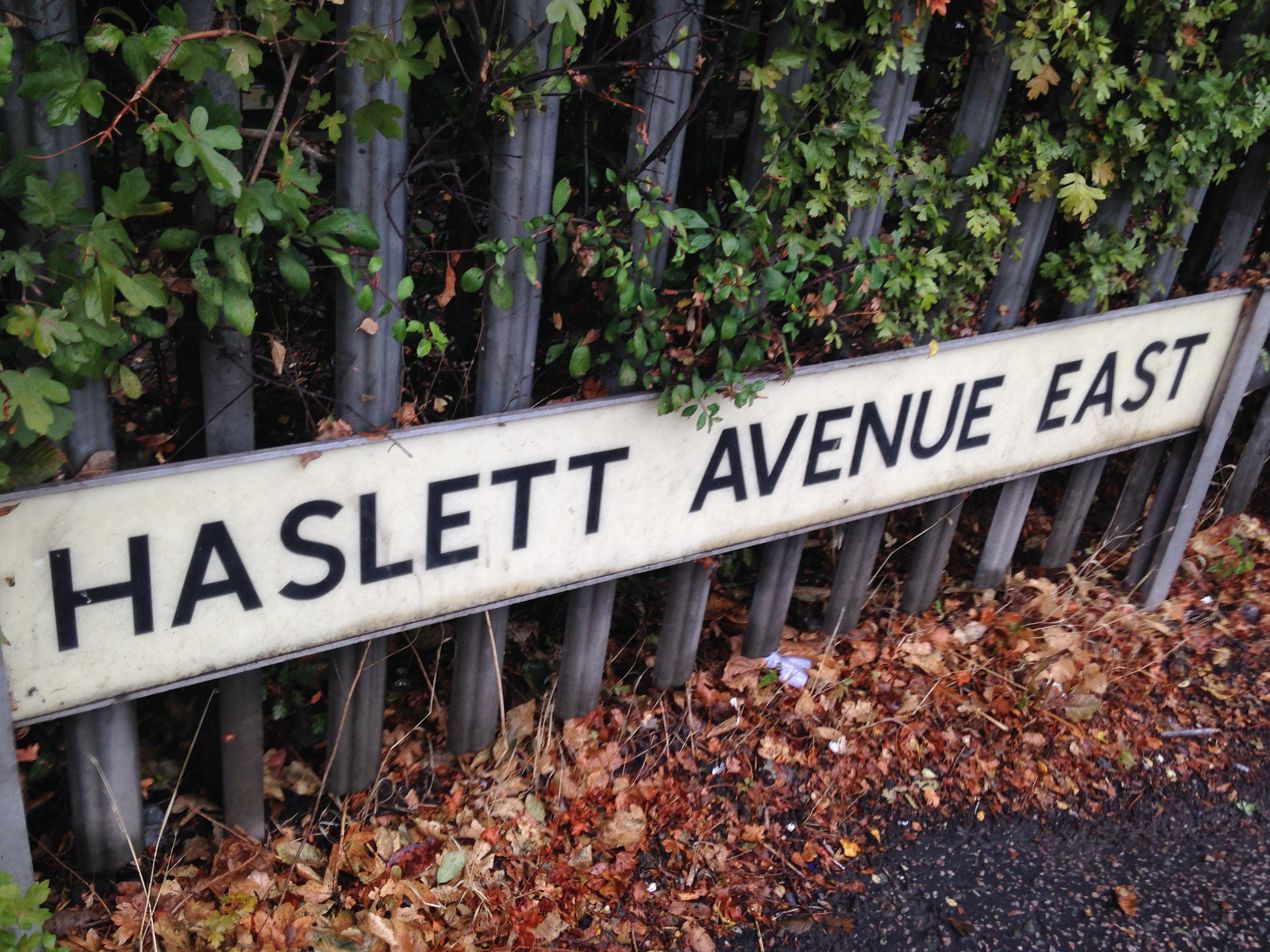
Street sign for Haslett Avenue East, Three Bridges

A blue plaque has been erected to honour her memory by Crawley Arts Council and EDF Energy. It is located in a road named after her: Haslett Avenue East, in Three Bridges, West Sussex.

Caroline Haslett Primary School in Milton Keynes, Buckinghamshire, is also named after her.

An exhibition about her life and work, the Caroline Haslett Memorial Project was held in April and May 2019 at the Hawth Theatre in Crawley.

Haslett features in the National Portrait Gallery's online walking tour of Mayfair.
