= Jan Peters (engineer) =

British engineer

Jan Peters MBE is an engineer, consultant and campaigner for diversity and inclusion in STEM. Peters was Head of the Government SET for Women Unit from 1999 until 2002 and was the UK National Expert on Women and Science to the European Commission. She published a strategic plan and has commissioned research on women returners and minority ethnic scientists and engineers. She also led a study into the challenges of finding well fitting safety clothing for women. From 2008 to 2011, Peters was the President of the Women's Engineering Society. At the Royal Society, she was the first Equality and Diversity Manager.

Peters founded education and inclusion consultancy Katalytik in 2004. She has delivered various work exploring Black and Asian women in leadership, engineering education and inclusion with University College London Engineering, and diversity in construction.

Peters was awarded an MBE in the 2017 New Year Honours. The same year, she was also awarded an honorary doctorate from Bournemouth University.

In 2018, Peters co-founded Discover Science Christchurch, a community campaign to create a science centre in Christchurch.
