= Margaret, Lady Moir =

Engineer and campaigner

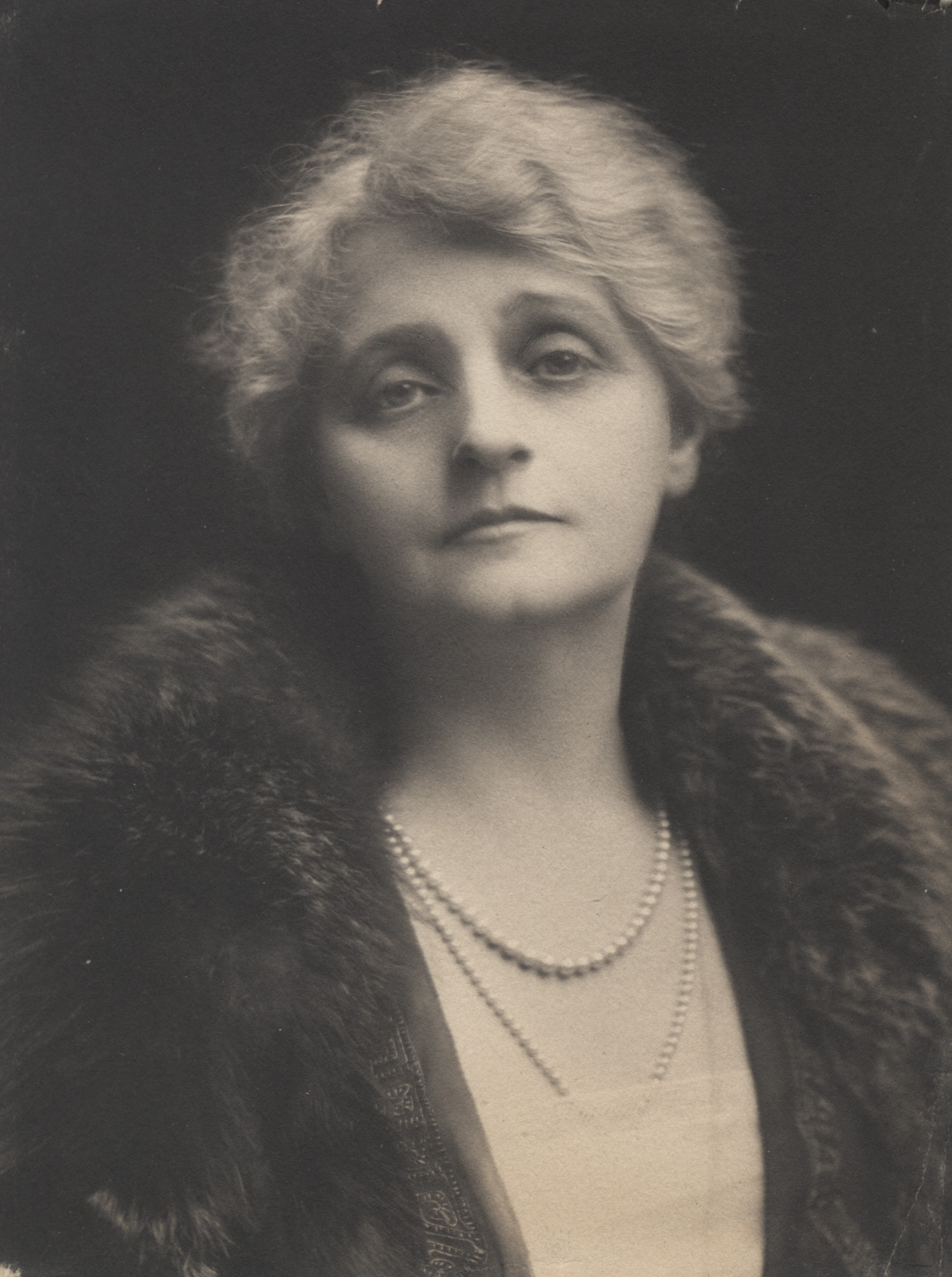
- Margaret Moir c.1900
- Born: Margaret Bruce Pennycook; 10 January 1864; Gorgie, Edinburgh, Scotland
- Died: 5 October 1942 (aged 78); Knightsbridge, London, England
- Occupations: Engineer, educator, employment relief worker
- Known for: Campaigner for women's rights and the electrification of the home
- Spouse: Ernest William Moir (1862–1933)
- Children: Reginald Moir (1893–1915); Arrol Moir (1894–1957); Edward Moir (1907)
- Awards: Order of the British Empire (OBE)

Margaret, Lady Moir, OBE (née Margaret Bruce Pennycook) (10 January 1864 – 5 October 1942) was a Scottish lathe operator, engineer, a workers' relief organiser, an employment campaigner, and a founder member of the Women's Engineering Society (WES). She went on to become vice-president and president of WES, and in 1931 president of the Electrical Association for Women (EAW), in which role she gave full expression to her belief that 'the dawn of the all-electric era' was at hand. She had no doubt about the importance of this development in freeing women to pursue careers outside the home:

'It is essential that women become electrically minded. By this I mean that they must not only familiarize themselves with electric washing machines, fires and cookers, but possess sufficient technical knowledge to enable them to repair fuses and make other minor adjustments. Only by doing so will women learn to value electricity's cheapness and utility, and regard it as a power to rescue them from all unnecessary household labours.'

Moir was appointed an OBE in recognition of her work during the First World War in organising the Week End Relief Scheme for women workers and in raising money for the National War Savings Committee. As the wife of the prominent civil engineer Sir Ernest Moir (1862–1933), she described herself as 'an engineer by marriage'. She organised a simplified engineering course for women at several polytechnics, supported the work of pioneering women aviators such as Mary, Lady Bailey and Amy Johnson, and campaigned throughout her life for better access to employment for women.

According to her friend and colleague Caroline Haslett, writing after her death in 1942, '[Britain] would have fewer resources in the numbers of trained women engineers and women knowledgeable in electrical matters if it had not been for the practical advice and interest, and also the financial support, of Margaret, Lady Moir.'

== Early life and family ==
She was born Margaret Bruce Pennycook on 10 January 1864 at Gorgie, Edinburgh, to John Pennycook, quarry manager, and Margaret (née Davidson). On 1 June 1887 she married Ernest William Moir of South Queensferry at Dalmeny House. They had three sons: Reginald (Rex) born in 1893, who died in 1915 of meningitis; Arrol born in 1894, who on 14 June 1933 succeeded his father as 2nd Baronet Moir of Whitehanger; and Edward, born 1907, who died soon after birth. After their marriage, the Moirs lived mostly in London and, later, at Whitehanger, Fernhurst, Surrey, but travelled widely.

== Career ==
Margaret Moir travelled all over the world with her husband as he undertook ever more ambitious civil engineering projects. She became closely involved in his work, calling herself an ‘engineer by marriage’. Among the many important ventures in which Ernest Moir played a part were the Forth Bridge, the Hudson River Tunnel, the Blackwall Tunnel and the Royal Albert Dock, both in London, Dover harbour, and Valparaíso harbour in Chile. Soon after the Boxer Rebellion (1899–1901), the Moirs travelled through the interior of China to oversee the construction of a railway in Honan (Henan), even though Margaret had been refused a permit because of the presumed danger to a western woman of undertaking such a journey.

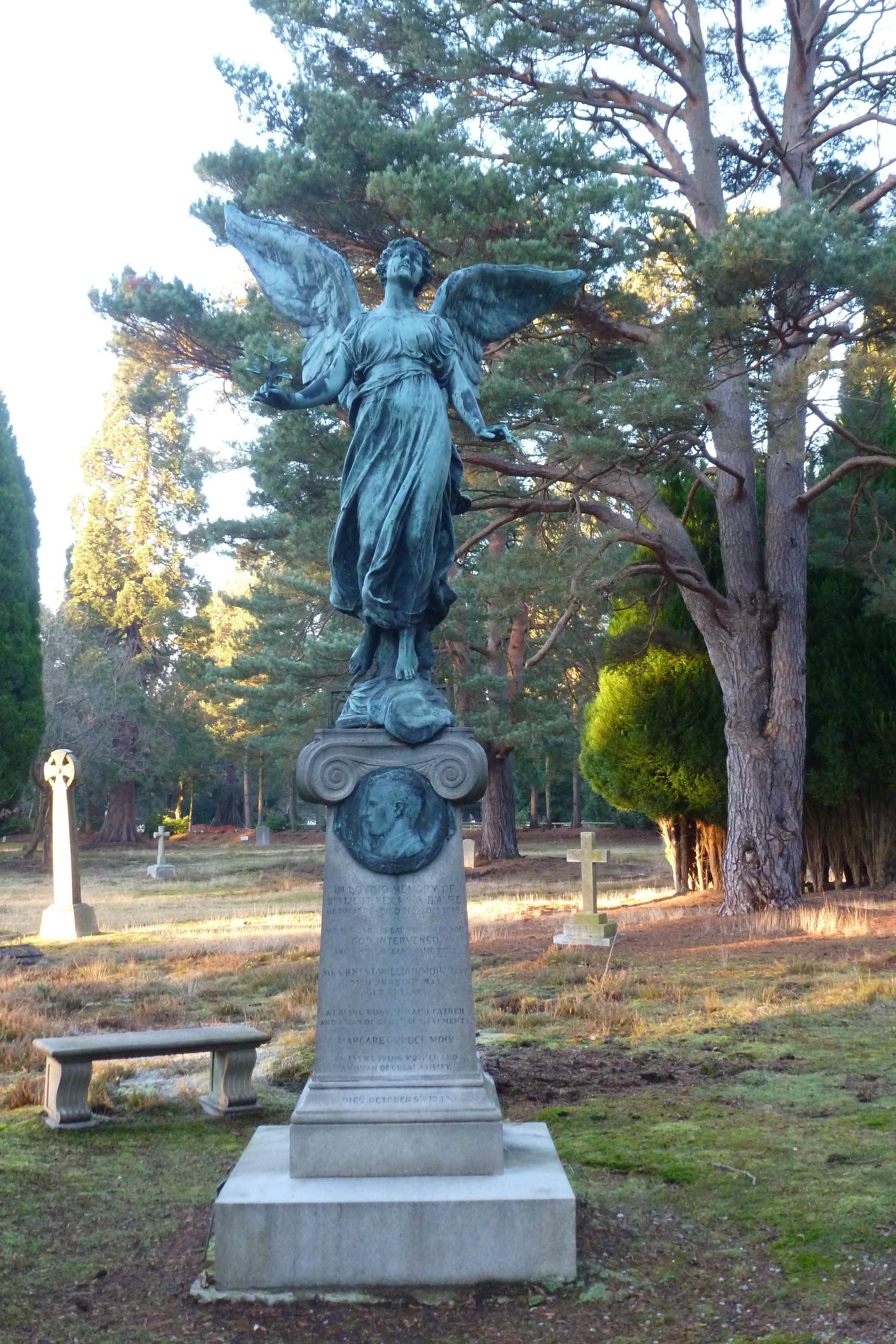
The spectacular memorial to the Moir family in Brookwood Cemetery, near Woking, Surrey, UK.

She saw at first hand the hideous dangers experienced by workers in the caissons, the compressed-air chambers used in the construction of bridges: '[We descended] the ladders rung by rung until we got on to the working floor, the sea and liquid mud being kept out entirely by air that was continuously pumped from above.' The appalling death and injury rate from caisson disease (also known as the bends or decompression sickness) prompted Ernest Moir to invent and implement a 'medical air lock' for the recompression and slow decompression of those workers who were overcome when they arrived on the surface. In the case of the Hudson River Tunnel, this reduced the annual death rate of workers from 25 to 1 per cent.

On completion of the Blackwall Tunnel in 1897, Margaret Moir became the first woman to walk under the River Thames from Kent to Middlesex. 'I then had to scramble up a ladder some 70 ft suspended in the air and come out of the air lock on the Poplar side,' she wrote later, acknowledging that she had not at the time appreciated the dangers involved.

Following the Shell Crisis of 1915, and the consequent employment of huge numbers of women in munitions factories, Margaret Moir's empathy with working people prompted her to organise a relief scheme to give weekend respite to full-time workers; their places were taken by Lady Moir and her colleagues. She herself worked for more than 18 months as a lathe operator.

She was treasurer and secretary of the Women's Advisory Committee of the National War Savings Committee, and she organised a sale of war savings certificates and war bonds in London department stores and at Victoria station, which reputedly raised several hundred thousand pounds. In recognition of her wartime work, in 1920 Margaret Moir was made an Officer of the Order of the British Empire (OBE).

When the Women's Engineering Society was formed in 1919, Lady Moir was a founder member alongside Rachel Parsons, Lady Katharine Parsons, Eleanor Shelley-Rolls, Laura Annie Willson, Margaret Rowbotham and Janetta Mary Ornsby. Lady Moir became president of the society in 1929 after two years as vice-president. It was during her presidency that a simplified engineering course for women was instigated in 1930 at several polytechnics.

== Electrical Association for Women ==
Having appreciated the extraordinary technical achievements of the age, Lady Moir saw opportunities for their application in the home. She became an early member and in 1931, president of the Electrical Association for Women (EAW). By 1931, there were twenty-five EAW branches across Britain with a total membership approaching 5,000. Upon her appointment as president of the EAW, she gave an address on 'Electrical Education' in Glasgow, as part of the celebrations for 'Civic and Empire Week': 'electrical knowledge is going to be education for our advancement. So "electrical education" has been chosen for our consideration and deliberation at this conference, as there is no more important subject just now from the point of view of national electrical development. The progress of the domestic and other uses of electricity depends very largely upon the education of all sections of the community in matters electrical.'

The work of professional women in many spheres interested her, and it was at her house in London that Mary, Lady Bailey and Amy Johnson lectured on their return from their flights, one round Africa and the other to Australia. Lady Moir supported the Over-30 Housing Association, and sponsored an all-electric flat in a block of flats built for single women living alone.

She died on 5 October 1942, at the age of 78 at her home in Knightsbridge, London. There is a memorial to the Moir family at Brookwood Cemetery, near Woking in Surrey.
