= Margaret Partridge =

Electrical engineer

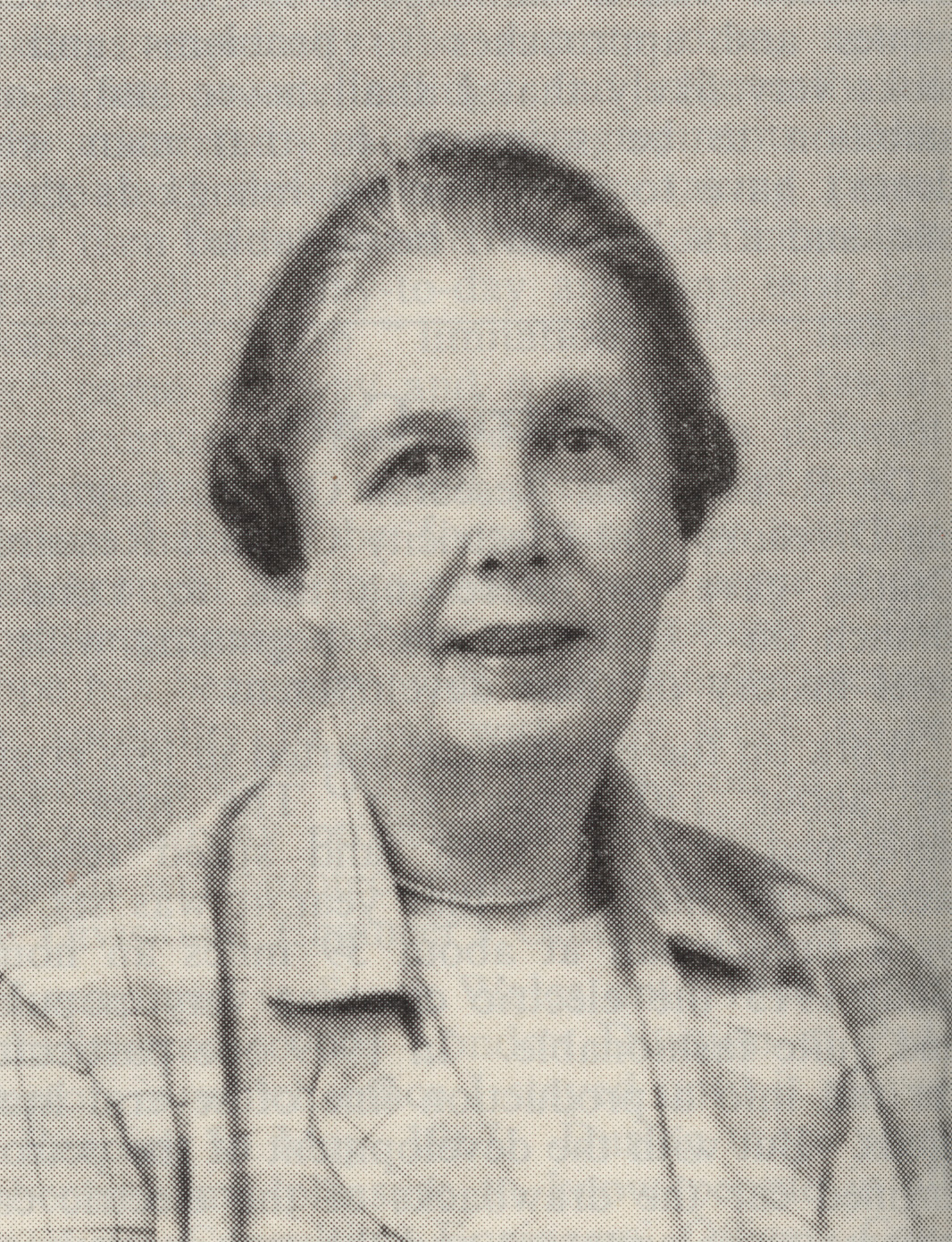
- Margaret Partridge, from The Woman Engineer
- Born: Margaret Mary Partridge; 8 April 1891; Nymet Rowland, Devon, England
- Died: 27 October 1967 (aged 76)
- Education: Bedford College, London
- Occupations: Electrical engineer, businesswoman
- Known for: Rural electricity installations, engineering apprenticeships

Margaret Mary Partridge (8 April 1891 – 27 October 1967) was an electrical engineer, contractor and founder member of the Women's Engineering Society (WES) and the Electrical Association for Women (EAW). Her business worked with WES to identify and employ female apprentices, including Beatrice Shilling. Partridge also helped campaign to change the International Labour Organisation convention on night work for women in 1934, after Shilling was found working on her own in a power station at night, thus contravening the existing regulations.

== Early life and education ==
Margaret Partridge was born in Nymet Rowland, Devon on 8 April 1891, elder daughter (she also having two brothers) of independently wealthy landowner John Leonard James Partridge (1859–1922) and Eleanor Parkhouse (1858–1926), née Joyce. She was educated at Bedford High School, Bedford, and obtained the Arnott and Jane Benson scholarship to study mathematics at Bedford College, London from 1911, where she graduated with a bachelor's degree in 1914. After graduating, Partridge initially tried teaching, although Margaret Tuke, principal of Bedford College, recognised that “she is also likely to prove successful in a non-scholastic post, in which her powers as an organiser will have scope". In 1915 Miss Tuke recommended Partridge for a role working for an engineering consultant in London where she found her true interest, working in engineering.

== Engineering career ==
'Today a man met me in the road and threatened to cut down some wires because he didn't like the look of them.'

In 1917, Partridge moved to the engineering company Arthur Lyon & Wrench, which manufactured searchlights. Taking advantage of the opportunities available to women working in industry during the First World War, she trained as an engineering apprentice and advanced to supervisor of the test department. At the end of the war, she decided to move back to the family home in Devon to set up her own electrical consulting business, M. Partridge & Co., Domestic Engineers, and advertised in the Women's Engineering Society's Journal The Woman Engineer under the slogan 'Women for Women's Work.' Her company soon expanded to bid for contracts to provide electricity supply for small towns and villages. She received a great deal of practical support and financial advice from Dr John Archibald Purves MIEE, an electrical engineer who would later advise on the electricity supply scheme for the whole of the west of England. Purves encouraged Partridge to set up electrical lighting companies for Cheriton Fitzpaine, Thorverton and Bampton where she brought electricity to the homes of the inhabitants for the first time. Although most residents were excited at the new developments, she also had to deal with complaints about rights of way and wires extending across properties and gardens.

Partridge was a delegate at the first meeting to develop the Electrical Association for Women, held on 12 November 1924 at 1 Upper Brook Street, home of Lady Katharine Parsons. The attendees represented the great and good of the electrical and engineering world and a large number of influential women's organisations. The meeting heard a paper from Mrs. Mabel Lucy Matthews on her proposal for an organisation to help raise the burden of domestic drudgery from women through the use and increased availability of electricity. Following what was described as "a lively discussion", Partridge proposed a resolution, which was agreed unanimously, “…to form a Women’s Electrical Association” and wishing “to put on record its thanks to Mrs Matthews”. The name was soon changed to the Electrical Association for Women to avoid confusion with the acronym of the Workers’ Educational Association.

She presented a paper entitled Producing and Distributing Electricity at the International Conference of Women in Science, Industry and Commerce organised by Caroline Haslett and the Women's Engineering Society at the British Empire Exhibition on 16 July 1925, speaking alongside the American engineer Ethel H. Bailey and physical chemist Isabel Hadfield.

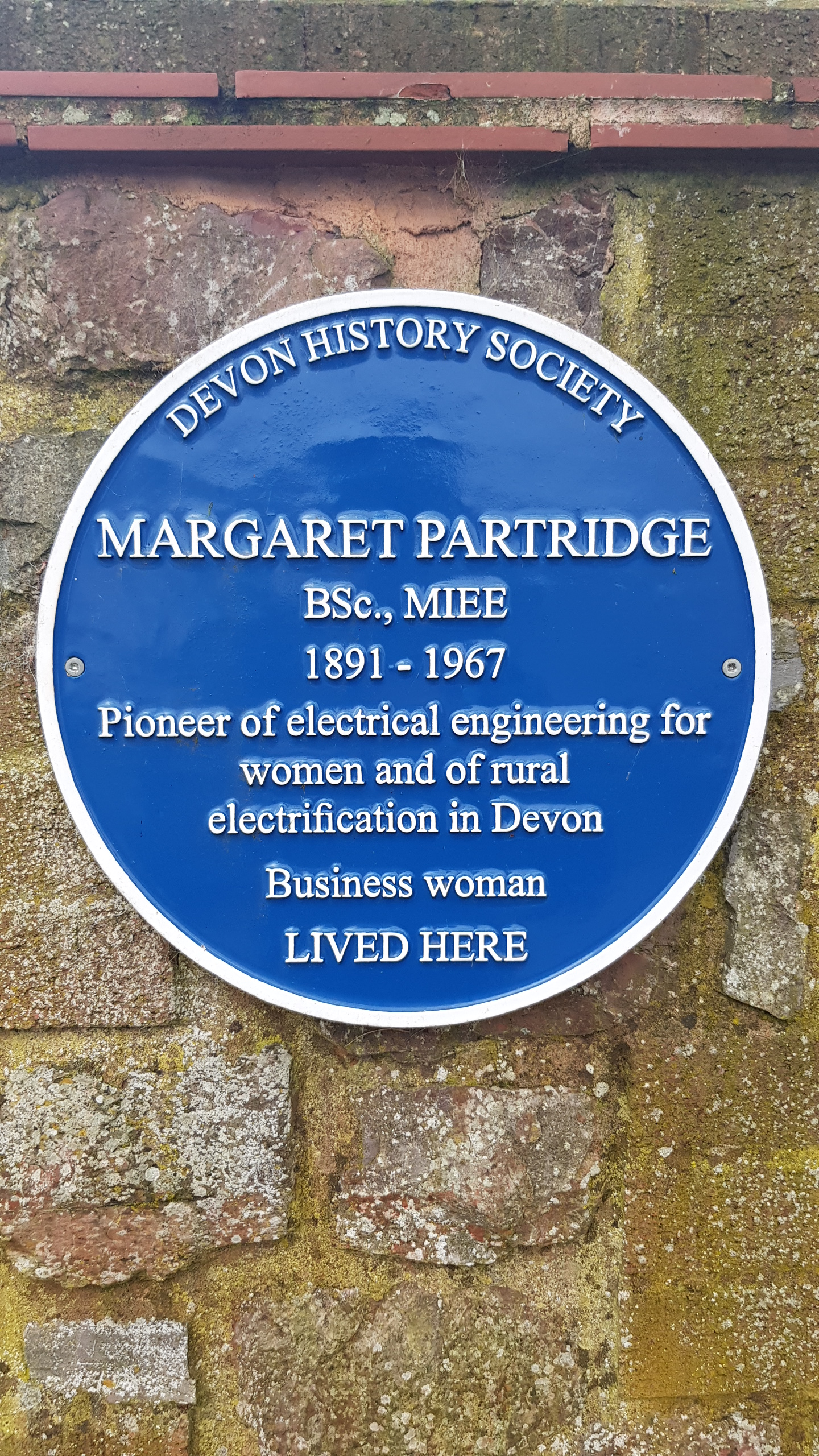
Blue plaque by Devon History Society at Margaret Partridge's former home in Willand, Devon.

Partridge decided to help young women who were interested in engineering as a career by offering apprenticeships specifically for young women leaving school. She wrote to Caroline Haslett asking for recommendations and was successful in appointing Beatrice Shilling who was an immediate success. Partridge and her partner, Margaret Rowbotham, encouraged Shilling to study at Manchester University and Shilling became a pioneering aeronautical engineer. It was Shilling who was discovered working on her own in a power station at night in contravention of the ILO Convention concerning Employment of Women during the Night (1919), which stated that women were not permitted to do any kind of industrial work at night. This case, with support from the Women's Engineering Society, eventually led to a change in the convention in 1934, exempting women who were working in a supervisory role.

During World War II, Partridge was appointed as the Ministry of Labour Women's Technical Officer for the South West, advising factories on the employment of women in munitions.

== Retirement and later work ==
Following her retirement. Partridge continued to live in Devon, with Margaret Rowbotham, and encouraged the members of her local Women's Institute to wire the village hall for electricity. On 15 September 1962, the couple wrote a letter of "grandmotherly advice" on the joys of retirement to their fellow women engineers in WES, and listed designing and supervising the building of a sports pavilion, and the conversion of a local stately home into a boys' school as well as serving on the Parish Council as part of their retirement activity.

Margaret Partridge died at her home, Harpitt, in Willand, Devon, on 27 October 1967.

The remains of both Margarets lie in Willand churchyard.

== Work for the Women's Engineering Society ==
Partridge joined the Women's Engineering Society in 1920. She became Vice-President in 1942, and President in 1943. She succeeded Gertrude Entwistle in the role and was succeeded by Dr. Winifred Hackett in 1946.

== Commemoration ==
A blue plaque was unveiled by Devon History Society at Margaret Partridge's former home in Willand, Devon in March 2019.

== See also ==
- Georgios Ginis
