= Rachel Mary Parsons =

British engineer (1885–1956)

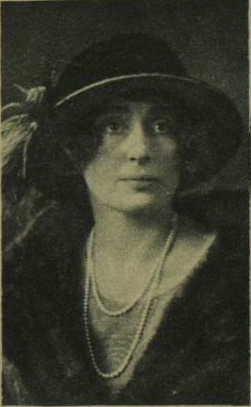
- Parsons in 1923
- Born: 25 January 1885; London, England
- Died: 2 July 1956 (aged 71); Lansdown House, Newmarket, Suffolk, England
- Education: Newnham College, Cambridge University
- Parents: Charles Algernon Parsons (father); Katharine Parsons (mother)
- Scientific career
- Fields: Engineering, politics, women's rights

Rachel Mary Parsons (25 January 1885 – 2 July 1956) was an English engineer and advocate for women's employment rights, who was the founding President of the Women's Engineering Society in 1919.

== Early life ==
Parsons was born in 1885, to Sir Charles Algernon Parsons and his wife Katharine, the daughter of William Froggatt Bethell of Rise Park, East Riding of Yorkshire. Her brother, Algernon George (Tommy) (b.1886), was killed on 28 April 1918 while a Major in the Royal Field Artillery. Her interest and aptitude for engineering and science was fostered from a young age by the engineering tradition in her family including her grandmother Mary Rosse and grandfather William Parsons, 3rd Earl of Rosse. Her father invented the steam turbine and developed successful international engineering businesses. The family lived on Tyneside (Elvaston Hall, Ryton, and Holeyn Hall, Wylam) and later in Northumberland (Ray Demesne, Kirkwhelpington).

She was educated at Newcastle High, Wycombe Abbey, Clarence House (May 1899 – April 1900) and finally Roedean from 1900 to 1903. In 1910 she entered Newnham College, Cambridge, and was one of the first three women to study Mechanical Sciences there although, like all women until 1948, she could not graduate with a degree or become a full member of the university. Nevertheless, she was able to add theoretical knowledge to the practical skills she had already obtained at her father's factory. She left in 1912 having taken the preliminary examination for Part I of the Tripos and a qualifying examination in Mechanical Sciences in 1911.

When the First World War broke out, she replaced her brother as a director at the Heaton Works of C. A. Parsons and Company in Newcastle upon Tyne. In particular, she oversaw the recruitment and training of women to replace the men who had left to join the armed forces. She became a leading member of the National Council of Women, and campaigned for equal access for all to technical schools and colleges, regardless of gender.

== Life after the First World War ==
Following her brother's death, Parsons did not resume her role as a director of the Heaton Works, possibly because of a rift with her father. As evidence of her continued aspirations in engineering she became a member of The Royal Institution of Great Britain in 1918, continuing to be a member until she died.

She and her mother, Katharine, Lady Parsons, were among the founders of the Women's Engineering Society alongside Eleanor, Lady Shelley-Rolls; Margaret, Lady Moir; Laura Annie Willson; Margaret Rowbotham and Janetta Mary Ornsby. The organisation promoted the retention of women engineers after the First World War by opposing the Restoration of Pre-War Practices Act 1919, as well as supporting engineering as a career for women. Rachel Parsons became the first president of the Women's Engineering Society on 23 June 1919, and served until 1921.

On 9 April 1919, with Blanche Thornycroft and Eily Keary, she was one of the first three women admitted to the Royal Institution of Naval Architects and from 1921 she became a lifelong member of the Royal Institute of International Affairs. She also held a Master Mariner's Certificate.

In 1920 Parsons was one of a group of eight women who founded the engineering company Atalanta Ltd, with her mother Katharine Parsons as chairman and one of the principal shareholders. All the employees were women and the director was Annette Ashberry. The company produced surface plates and machine models. It was initially based in Loughborough, where it was intended that the employees could receive further education at the Loughborough College of Technology. Atalanta moved to London, with premises initially in Fulham Road in 1922 and then Brixton Road in 1925. It was voluntarily wound up in 1928.

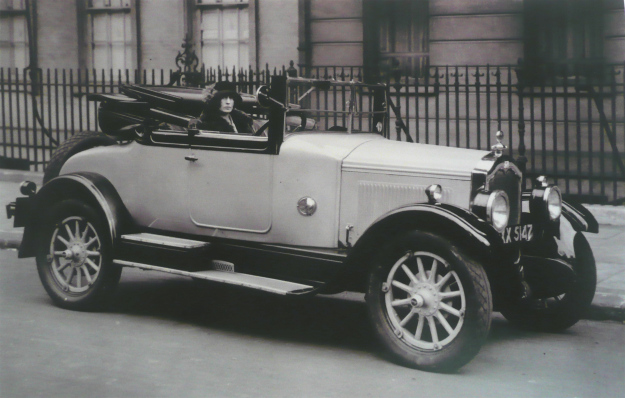
Rachel Parsons driving a Buick in Grosvenor Square, London, 1925

In 1922 Parsons bought 5 Portman Square, a large house in London, and began to host social events attended by the elite of London society. That year she became one of the few women members of the London County Council, representing Finsbury for the Municipal Reform Party, and sat on the Electricity and Highways Committee. She stood for Parliament in the 1923 election as the Conservative candidate in the constituency of Ince, Lancashire, but was not elected. She moved to the larger property of 5 Grosvenor Square in 1926 and continued as a society hostess. She put herself forward for selection as the Conservative candidate for Newcastle in 1940, but was not successful.

In 1940 she moved into the countryside at Sunningdale, Berkshire, purchasing Little Court, a Georgian-style house with twenty-five acres of land. However, she also maintained a London residence, living successively in two houses in Belgrave Square. Her interest in horse racing led her to buy the 2600-acre Branches Park estate at Cowlinge near Newmarket, Suffolk, in the 1940s where she built up a large stud farm, as well as in 1954 purchasing the Lansdowne House racing stable in Falmouth Avenue, Newmarket. She had several notable successes from her stables. These included wins in 1953 with Cavalleria, Golden God and Fraise Melba (trained by Geoffrey Brooke) followed by success with Le Dieu D'Or, Golden God and Fraise Melba under trainer Sam Armstrong.

== Death ==
Parsons was found dead on 2 July 1956. Stableman Dennis James Pratt, a former employee, was charged with her murder. Defended by Michael Havers, a future attorney-general, Pratt was convicted of manslaughter on the grounds of provocation.

Her cousin, Canon R. E. Parsons, officiated at her funeral which was held on 6 July at St Mary's church, Newmarket, and attended by, among others, her cousin Michael Parsons, 6th Earl of Rosse.

== Commemoration ==
In 2017, one of six tunnel boring machines for London's Thames Tideway Tunnel 'Super Sewer' project was named after Rachel Parsons and began tunnelling from Fulham in 2018. The names were chosen from a shortlist by a public vote. A blue plaque was unveiled in her honour in October 2023 at 6 Windsor Terrace, where Parsons lived during the First World War. The building is part of Newcastle University's halls of residence and was proposed by The Common Room organisation.
