= Laura Annie Willson =

British engineer and suffragette

Laura Annie Willson MBE
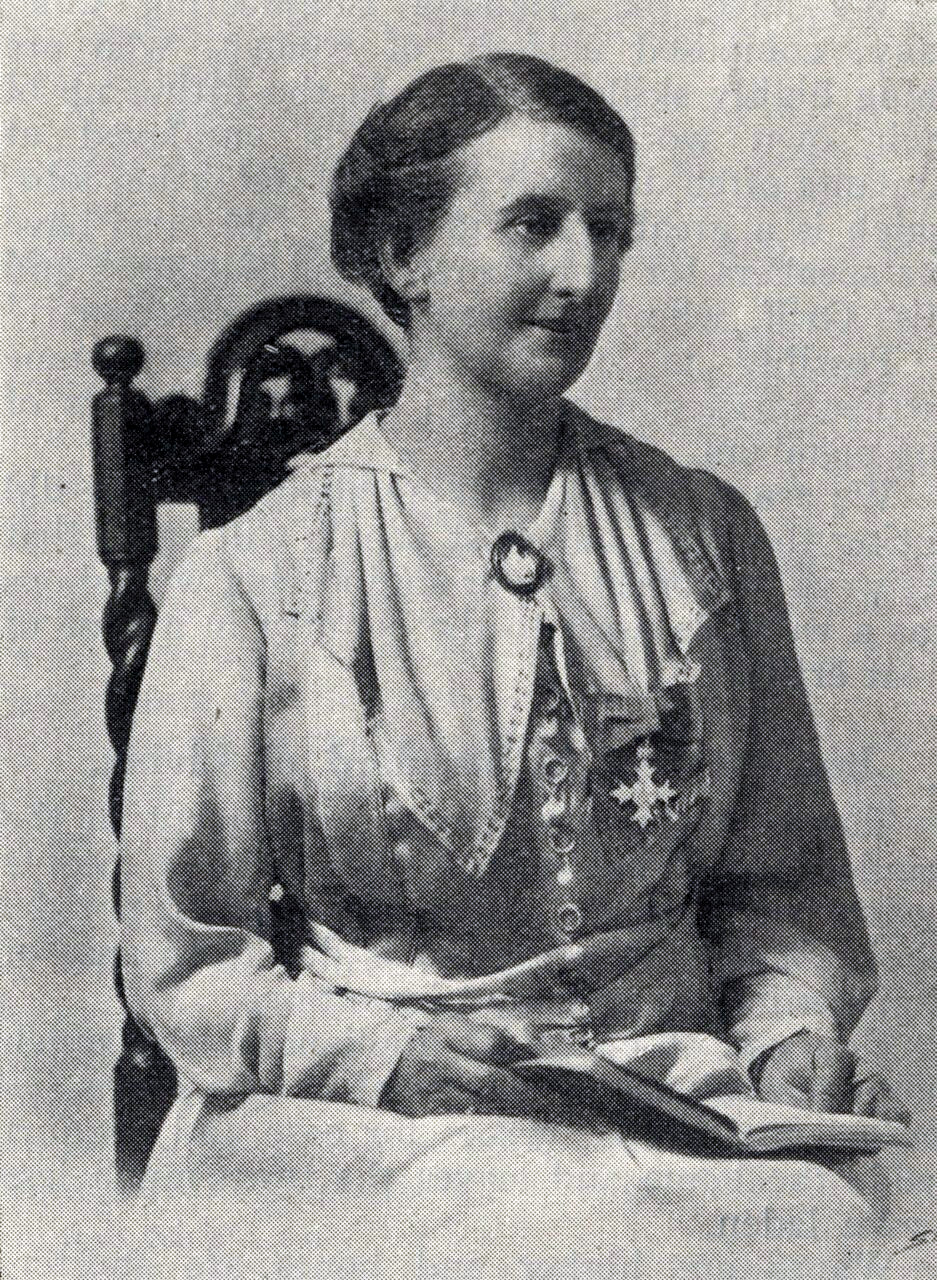
- Willson c.1925
- Born: Laura Annie Buckley; 15 August 1877; Halifax, Yorkshire, England
- Died: 17 April 1942 (aged 64); Walton-on-Thames, Surrey, England
- Occupations: Engineer, housebuilder, women's rights campaigner
- Spouse: George Henry Willson
- Children: 2

Laura Annie Willson MBE (née Buckley) (15 August 1877 – 17 April 1942) was an English engineer and suffragette, who was twice imprisoned for her political activities. She was one of the founding members of the Women's Engineering Society and was the first female member of the Federation of House Builders.

== Early life and factory career ==
Laura Annie Buckley was born on 15 August 1877 in Halifax, Yorkshire to Charles Buckley (1836/7–1899), dyer's labourer, and Augusta, née Leaver (1838/9–1907). She started work at the age of ten as a 'half-timer' in a local textile factory. Half time in factories was introduced to spare children from working a full day; instead they worked half the day and spent the rest of the time at school, which was often built within the factory compound.

When she married George Henry Willson in 1899, she was described as a worsted coating weaver. Her husband was a maker of machine tools who established a successful engineering works in Halifax, which she would help to run. The Willsons had two children, George (born in 1900) and Kathleen Vega, known as Vega, (born 1910).

== Campaigning for women's suffrage ==
She became strongly involved in the trade union movement, becoming branch secretary of the Women's Labour League in Halifax in 1907. She was also a secretary of the Halifax branch of the Women's Social and Political Union which formed in January 1906.

In 1907, she took part in a weavers' strike at Hebden Bridge, where she was arrested for 'inciting persons to commit a breach of the peace'. Appearing at the magistrates court, she challenged the legitimacy of the court's exclusively male constitution, demanding to be either tried by her peers or be provided with a female lawyer. She was found guilty and sentenced to fourteen days in prison. On her release, Willson reportedly said 'I went to gaol a rebel, but I have come out a regular terror'. Weeks later, she was one of 75 women arrested after a suffragette rally at Caxton Hall. She was sentenced to fourteen days in Holloway Prison.

In January 1909, Richard Haldane, the War Secretary, spoke at the Victoria Hall in Halifax and the organisers went to great lengths to keep out suffrage campaigners. Willson nevertheless managed to get a seat near the stage and along with six other ‘voteless ladies of the strenuous type’ interrupted him throughout the evening before being thrown out, Willson the last one to be ejected. Her husband George supported activism throughout her suffrage campaigning.

== First World War ==
She was a joint-director of the lathe-making factory Smith Barker & Willson with her husband, which during the First World War produced munitions. The predominantly female workforce were trained and supervised by Laura Annie. Noticing that some of the employees were going without food so that their children could eat, she established a works canteen to ensure that the women were properly nourished. This idea was adopted by factories across the United Kingdom. In 1917, the same year the Order of the British Empire honours were instituted, she was awarded an MBE for her contribution to 'Women's Work in Munitions'.

== Engineering career ==
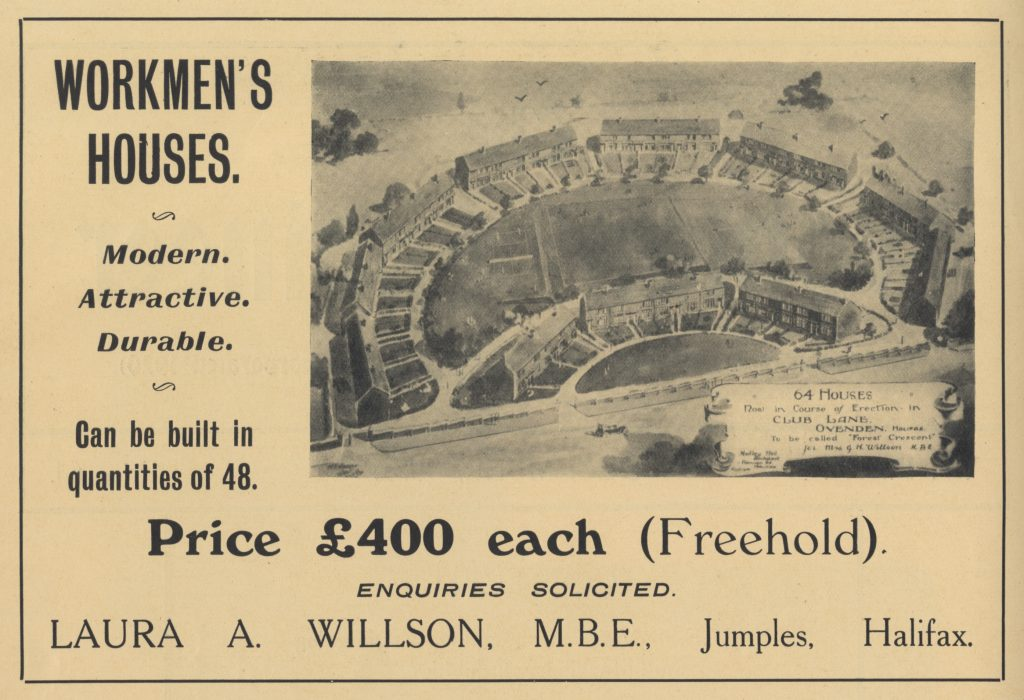
Advert for Laura Annie Willson houses in Jumples

In 1919, she co-founded the Women's Engineering Society (WES) with Rachel Parsons, Margaret, Lady Moir, Lady Katharine Parsons, Eleanor Shelley-Rolls, Margaret Rowbotham and Janetta Mary Ornsby. The aim of WES was to protect the positions that women had gained in industry during World War I, and to promote equal opportunities for women in engineering. She was president of WES from 1926 to 1928.

== House building ==
She became the first woman member of the Federation of House Builders, constructing 72 houses for workers in Halifax in 1925–26. She was a founding member of the Electrical Association for Women in 1924, alongside Caroline Haslett; this interest was reflected in her housing estates which had the latest gas and electricity appliances.

In 1927, having moved to Surrey from Halifax with her husband, Willson continued her trade as a builder by purchasing land at Englefield Green. She is credited with selling over 500 houses, and left a portfolio which was still earning income three decades later.

== Later years ==
By the late 1930s, Willson's health had begun to falter, although she was able to continue supporting the Women's Engineering Society and attended the organisation's 21st birthday celebrations at the Park Lane Hotel on 4 March 1940. She was quoted in The Woman Engineer "It is lovely to think of our Society being now twenty one years of age, and still active and of course willing to do all in its power at any time in the interest of the Country. I look back with pleasure on all the efforts of the Society and trust that in this hard fight for freedom, that the efforts of the women will once more prove of great help to the Country… The Women’s Engineering Society will always have a warm corner in my heart, they are a grand set of women to have known and worked with." Laura Annie Willson died on 17 April 1942 and cremated at Woking on 20 April.

== Legacy ==
Her archives are held by Surrey History Centre. In recognition of her impact as an engineer, the University of Huddersfield's renovated Technology Building was named the Laura Annie Willson Building in July 2022 in a ceremony attended by her granddaughter Joanna Stoddart. It will house a research space for the School of Computing and Engineering.

In July 2025, a blue plaque commemorating the life and work of Willson was unveiled in Halifax by the Halifax Civic Trust and Calderdale Industrial Museum. Also in 2025, a new road bridge on the way into Halifax on the A629 was named The Laura Annie Willson Bridge.

A new play ‘A Regular Terror’ based on the life of Laura Annie Willson written by Alan Stockdill is to be performed at the Halifax Playhouse, Hebden Bridge Little Theatre and other venues by Talking Stock Productions in June/July 2026.
