= Janetta Mary Ornsby =

Scottish suffragist (1871–1954)

- Born: Janetta Mary Isabel Palmer; 22 July 1871; Boston, Lincolnshire, England
- Died: 17 August 1954 (aged 83); Edinburgh, Scotland

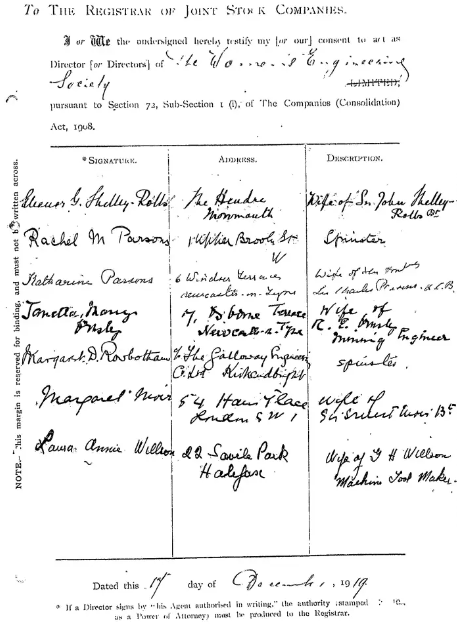
Women's Engineering Society formed by these seven signatures in 1919

Janetta Mary Isabel Ornsby (née Palmer; 22 July 1871 – 17 August 1954) was a Scottish suffragist and one of the founders of the Women's Engineering Society.

== Early life ==
Ornsby was born in Boston, Lincolnshire, to Rev. Albert Reynolds Palmer of Dalkeith and Margaret Anne MacFarlane (1839–93) of Collessie, Fife. She was the granddaughter of Dr. John MacFarlane, minister of the Free Church of Scotland in Dalkeith, and had three siblings: Ethel, who undertook medical training at the University of Edinburgh; Charles, an architect; and Brien, a minister in Australia.

== Marriage ==
In 1896, Janet Palmer married Robert Embleton Ornsby (1856–1920), agent to the Seaton Delaval Coal Company and author of the memoirs of James Robert Hope Scott in 1884. Due to her husband's ill health, she often addressed coalminers and coal owners in his absence.

== Women's Engineering Society ==
Ornsby was involved in the women's suffrage movement and was one of the seven signatories on the founding documents for the Women's Engineering Society in 1919, alongside Lady Katharine Parsons, her daughter Rachel Parsons, Margaret, Lady Moir, Laura Annie Willson, Eleanor Shelley-Rolls and Margaret Rowbotham. She was elected to the WES Council at the first AGM on 19 May 1920.

She died in 1954 in Edinburgh.
