= Katharine Parsons =

Engineer, founder and second President of the Women's Engineering Society

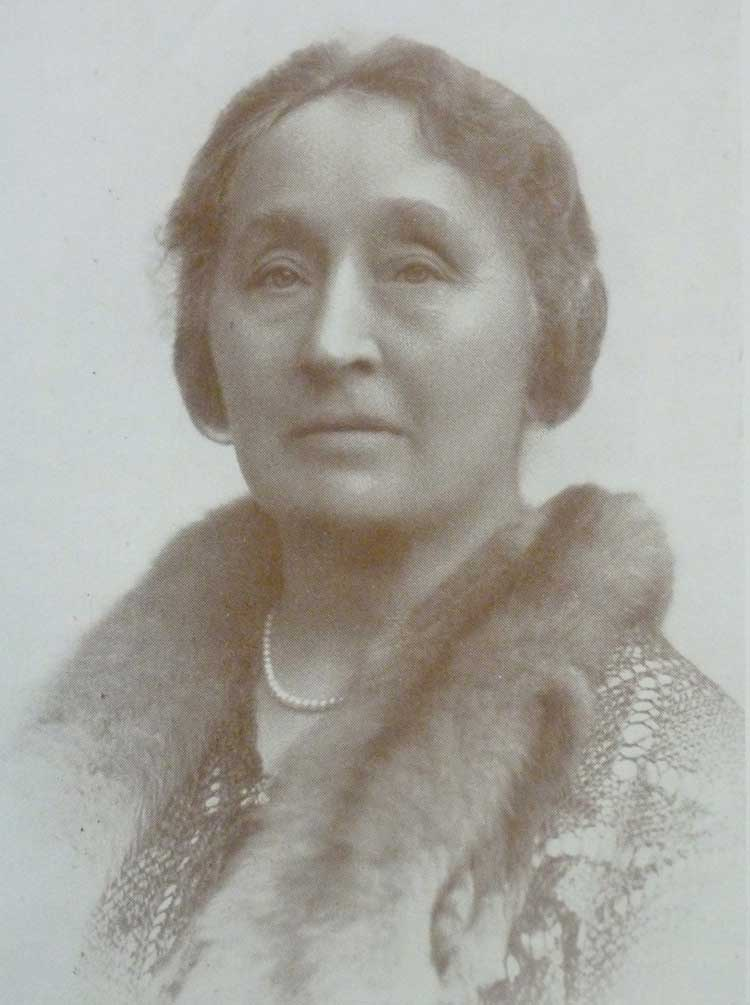
The Hon. Lady Parsons

Katharine, Lady Parsons (née Bethell; 1858/1859 – 16 October 1933) was an English engineer who was the co-founder and second President of the Women's Engineering Society.

== Partnership with Charles Parsons ==
Born to William Frogatt Bethell at Rise Park in the East Riding of Yorkshire in 1858 or 1859, Katharine met the Hon. Charles Parsons in Leeds in 1882 while he was working there as an engineer. They married in January 1883 and had two children, Algernon George and Rachel Mary. In their early married days Katharine would regularly accompany Charles on 7 am morning lakes trials of his prototype torpedoes at Roundhay Park in Leeds.

Throughout nearly a half-century of marriage, she was almost always to be found working closely with him on engineering projects – both at home and in the commercial engineering works – especially during the period in which the Parsons steam turbine was developed.

== The First World War ==
In 1916, Parsons worked with suffragette and women's rights campaigner Norah Balls to set up Girl Guides in Northumberland.

Famed for her robust character and exceptional organisational skills, during the First World War Lady Parsons was closely involved in managing the female workforces in Tyneside converted armaments factories. It was for this war work that Lady Parsons was made the first Honorary Fellow of the North-East Coast Institution of Engineers and Ship-builders in 1919.

Having seen the highly effective deployment of women in engineering work during the Great War, Lady Parsons was robustly critical of the removal of many women from such work under the terms of the Restoration of Pre-War Practices Act 1919 that restored many returning male combatants to their pre-war responsibilities.

In a widely publicised speech on July 9, 1919: 'Women's Work and Shipbuilding during the War' she deplored the way that women had been required to produce the 'implements of war and destruction' but then be denied 'the privilege of fashioning the munitions of peace.'

== The Women's Engineering Society ==
Just three weeks earlier she had launched the Women's Engineering Society (WES) in collaboration with her daughter Rachel, and five other women of influence, Eleanor Shelley-Rolls; Janetta Mary Ornsby; Margaret D Rowbotham; Margaret, Lady Moir & Laura Annie Willson in order to protect women's position in the field, and enable them to communicate, and especially to share opportunities for training and employment.

It was Lady Parsons who appointed Caroline Haslett to be first Secretary of WES in February 1919. Frequent financial challenges arising from the difficulties of prompted Lady Parsons to make substantial donations to keep the fledgling Society afloat.

Lady Parsons was also a co-founder of Atalanta Ltd, a company set up specifically to supply employment for women in engineering work. Following a period as president by Rachel Parsons, Lady Parsons was President of WES from 1922 to 1925. Her annual speeches during that WES presidency were described by a contemporary as 'masterly in their range and thorough in details'. In that latter year, however, she broke off relations with WES after a disagreement with Caroline Haslett over the future direction of the Society.

== Later years ==
Lady Parsons served as a magistrate from 1921, and for her public achievements was admitted to the freedom of the Worshipful Company of Shipwrights and later given the freedom of the City of London. Nevertheless, she also found much time to pursue her pastimes of riding horses, long-distance driving and entertaining guests at the family home of Ray Demesthene at Kirkwhelpington.

After Charles Parsons's passing in 1931, Lady Parsons was a major source for Rollo Appleyard's biography of her late husband. She died in 1933 after a long battle with cancer.

== Legacy ==
The Women's Engineering Society, which Katherine co-founded in July 1919, has fostered women's careers in engineering, science and technology ever since.
