= Margaret Dorothea Rowbotham =

British engineer and women's rights campaigner

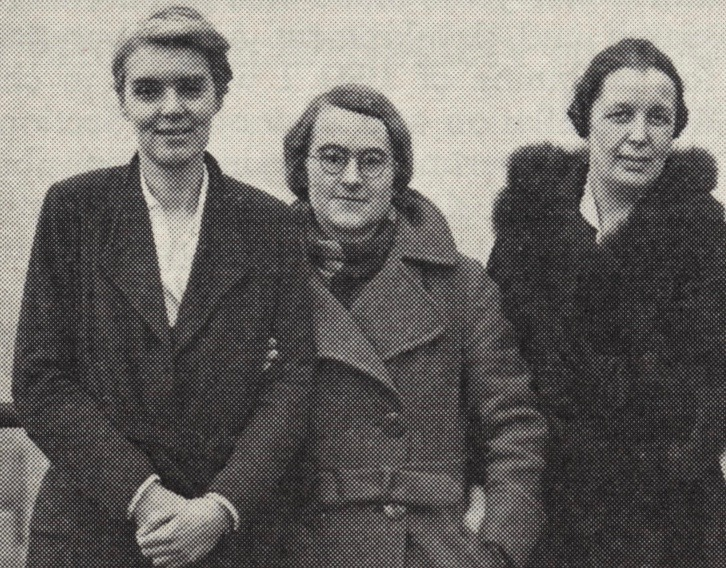
- Margaret Rowbotham (left) with Tilly Shilling and Margaret Partridge in 1934
- Born: 19 June 1883; Plumstead, Kent, England
- Died: 23 February 1978 (aged 94); Willand, Devon, England
- Occupation: Engineer
- Known for: Women's rights campaigner

Margaret Dorothea Rowbotham (Note: She was referred to as Dorothy Rowbotham by Clarsen, but was commonly known as Margaret Dorothea Rowbotham.) (19 June 1883 – 23 February 1978) was an engineer, a campaigner for women's employment rights and a founder member of the Women's Engineering Society.

== Early life and education ==
Born on 19 June 1883 at 6 Park Villas, Plumstead, Kent, Margaret Rowbotham (sometimes known as Madge) was the daughter of John Edward Rowbotham, a shipbroker, and Miriam Anne Isaac. She was educated at Blackheath High School and graduated in 1905 from Girton College, Cambridge, where she studied mathematics. From Cambridge Training College, she received a diploma to teach. In 1935, she stated in the Register of Women Engineers that she was "one of the first six women motorcyclists".

== Career ==
From 1906 to 1913 she taught maths at Roedean School for girls in Brighton. Having completing six months' training in motor engineering at the British School of Motoring, she was awarded a RAC driving certificate. This was followed by an assignment in 1914 as a teacher at Rupert's Land Ladies' College, in Winnipeg, Manitoba, where she stayed for two years.

She joined Galloway Engineering Co. at Tongland near Kirkcudbright, Dumfriesshire, becoming a machine shop and works superintendent at Tongland Works beginning in 1917.

After World War I, when the Restoration of Pre-War Practices Act 1919 meant loss of employment for many skilled women engineers, the Women's Engineering Society was formed in 1919, and Margaret Rowbotham was a founding signatory and member alongside Rachel Parsons; Lady Katharine Parsons; Margaret, Lady Moir; Laura Annie Willson and Janetta Mary Ornsby. She was a council member of the society until 1944, was made an honorary member of the society in 1962, and remained involved in it throughout her life.

In 1921, she was employed at Swainson Pump Company in Newcastle as assistant works manager. She then worked at Model Laundries in Wealdstone, Kent from 1922 to 1923 under Ethyl Jayne, before teaching again at Roedean School in 1924. In 1927, she was appointed a director of the electrical engineering firm M. Partridge & Co., founded by her partner Margaret Partridge, where she stayed until 1953. She also worked in other engineering positions.

In her later years, she worked in Eastbourne as a manager of a guesthouse.

== Retirement and later work ==
Following their retirement, Rowbotham lived in Devon, with Margaret Partridge, and encouraged the members of their local Women's Institute to wire the village hall for electricity. On 15 September 1962, the couple wrote a letter of "grandmotherly advice" on the joys of retirement to their fellow women engineers in WES, and listed designing and supervising the building of a sports pavilion, and the conversion of a local stately home into a boys' school as well as serving on the Parish Council as part of their retirement activity.

The remains of both Margarets lie in Willand churchyard.

She died on 23 February 1978. Some of her correspondence has been archived at the Imperial War Museum, which included information about women working in the field and the establishment of an exhibit on oil and water pumps at the museum.
