= Lesley Souter =

Engineer, first female electrical engineering student at the University of Glasgow

- Born: 23 October 1917; Elgin, Moray
- Died: 21 April 1981 (aged 63); Rugby, Warwickshire

Lesley Scott Souter (23 October 1917 – 21 April 1981) was the first female electrical engineering student at the University of Glasgow, graduating in 1940.

== Biography ==
Souter was born in Elgin, Moray, Scotland to James Stephen Souter and his wife on 25 October 1917. Her father was an electrical Engineer. Souter went to the University of Glasgow in 1936 and on graduation she returned to Elgin where she worked as an engineer. A summer job at the General Electrical Company in Wembley led further employment opportunities and Souter spent time working for GEC research labs and on GEC's solid state physics research. While there she had a patent from her work on resistors registered. In 1946, Souter was chosen to demonstrate technical equipment to Queen Mary and Princess Elizabeth when they visited the GEC research facility.

Souter also worked for both Mullard and Siemens Research Laboratories. After retirement Souter was elected to Rugby Borough Council in 1976 as their Conservative councillor. She is remembered by Lesley Souter House.

== Memberships ==
Souter was a member of the Institution of Electrical Engineers.

Souter was an active member of the Women's Engineering Society (WES), becoming a full member in 1940, joined the Council in 1943 and was elected vice president in 1959. In December 1948, Souter took part in a Woman's Hour radio programme about women in industry and spoke about her work designing and making X-ray equipment for medical use, alongside WES colleagues Madeleine Nobbs, Cicely Thompson and Veronica Drake. In 1958, she co-wrote Training and Opportunities for Women in Engineering with Verena Holmes for The Woman Engineer, the Journal of the Women's Engineering Society. She travelled to the USSR with Rose Winslade in 1960 (funded by the Caroline Haslett Memorial Trust founded by the British Electricity Authority). They went to investigate the role of female engineers in the USSR.

Lesley Souter died on 21 April 1981 in Rugby, Warwickshire. Her WES obituary was written by Marjorie Bell.

== Commemoration ==
Lesley Souter House, a retirement housing complex in Rugby, Warwickshire is named in her honour.

Souter was inducted into the Scottish Engineering Hall of Fame in 2025.
