= Margaret R. Fox =

American electronics engineer

- Born: May 19, 1916
- Died: August 27, 2006 (aged 90); Monroe, Wisconsin
- Education: Wisconsin State College of Milwaukee
- Known for: Chief of the Office of Computer Information, National Bureau of Standards (now National Institute of Standards and Technology
- Scientific career
- Workplaces: U.S. Naval Reserve, National Institute of Standards and Technology

Margaret R. Fox (May 19, 1916 – August 27, 2006) was an American electronics engineer and computer scientist. She was the Chief of the Office of Computer Information, part of the Institute for Computer Science and Technology of the National Bureau of Standards (now the National Institute of Standards and Technology) from 1966 to 1975 and was the first secretary of the American Federation of Information Processing Societies.

== Education ==
Margaret Rose Fox was born on May 19, 1916. She graduated from Wisconsin State College of Milwaukee in 1940.

== Work ==
She taught school before joining the U.S. Naval Reserve in 1943. She was stationed at the Naval Research Station in Washington, D.C. and after her discharge in 1946, she continued working as an electronics engineer in radar. Fox joined the National Bureau of Standards as a member of the technical staff of the Electronic Computer Laboratory in 1951 and later joined the Research Information Center and Advisory Service on Information Processing, where she produced reviews and bibliographies. Along with Samuel N. Alexander, Fox prepared and planned a series of college computer courses beginning in 1966. She chaired the Technical Program Committee and in 1973, she became representative of the Bureau's Center for Computer Sciences and Technology.

She was appointed Chief of the Office of Computer Information, part of the Institute for Computer Science and Technology of the National Bureau of Standards (now the National Institute of Standards and Technology) in 1966. Fox held this position until 1975.

== Society of Women Engineers ==
Fox was in charge of the Technical Program for the first International Conference of Women Engineers and Scientists (ICWES) which was held in New York City, United States of America in 1964 and was organised by the Society of Women Engineers (SWE). She worked alongside Beatrice Hicks the Conference Director and Ruth Shafer the Operations Chairman and Elsie Eaves who managed the PR for the conference.

Fox was elected a Fellow of SWE in 1991.

== Personal life ==
Fox was a Soroptimist and was one of 26 Washington area residents honored by The Capital Area Division of the United Nations Association in 1979 for their work in furthering human rights.

Margaret R. Fox died on August 27, 2006, in Monroe, Wisconsin, aged 90 and was buried with her family at Immaculate Conception Catholic Church Cemetery, Lafayette County, Wisconsin.
