= Maria Watkins =

Defence electronics engineer and lecturer

- Born: Marja Ludwika Ziff; 2 December 1918; Vienna, Austria
- Died: 2 September 2010 (aged 91); Highgate, London, England
- Education: University of Edinburgh
- Occupations: Engineer; electrical engineer
- Employer: City University
- Organization: Women's Engineering Society Institution of Electrical Engineers

Marja "Maria" Ludwika Watkins FIEE (née Ziff; 2 December 1918 – 2 September 2010) was a defence electronics engineer, lecturer and President of the Women's Engineering Society.

== Early life ==
Ziff was born on 2 December 1918 in Vienna, Austria, and grew up in the Polish city of Lvov. Her parents were of Ukrainian descent; her father was director of a bank, and her mother was a research chemist at Lvov University.

== Education ==
In 1938, Ziff applied to study electrical engineering at the University of Edinburgh. She was accepted and moved to Scotland, surprising the professor who had offered her a place, as he had believed her application was from a Polish man. She became the first woman to study electrical engineering there. She joined the Women's Engineering Society on her arrival in the UK in 1939. In 1941, she graduated from the University of Edinburgh with a degree in Electrical Engineering (Communications). As the situation worsened in Europe, her family refused to join her. Following the invasion of Poland by Russia and Germany, her parents and grandparents died in the concentration camps, only her sister surviving. She never felt able to return to Poland.

== Career ==
In 1942, Ziff became a technical assistant at Johnson and Phillips Ltd. The company made cabling and navigation items for aircraft, and she worked on technical problems of their distribution systems. Her job was varied, including working as a research assistant for new airplane guidance systems, to supervising the repair of overhead power cables shot down by drunken soldiers or repairing electrical exchanges damaged by bombings. She was one of the assistants to Jules Thorn, the founder of Thorn Electrical Industries, one of the United Kingdom's largest electrical businesses. She lived in Blackheath, London during the latter part of the Second World War, volunteering as an air raid warden in the evenings. During this time she was working on research for the PLUTO Pipeline Under The Ocean project and on a secret airplane guidance system.

In 1947, a year after her marriage, Watkins was appointed a lecturer at South East London Technical College. In 1959, she became a lecturer at Northampton College of Advanced Technology, now the City University, and was later promoted to Senior Lecturer, working there until 1985. She was a member of Council and Senate of City University for three years, and a member of Council and the Qualification board of the Institution of Electrical Engineers from 1976 to 1979.

In 1981, Watkins attended the International Conference of Women Engineers and Scientists (ICWES) in Bombay, combining it with travel around India and Nepal. She also attended the 1991 ICWES in Coventry. She undertook research in medical electronics and published at least 13 papers on these subjects. She was a visiting professor at Worcester Polytechnic Institute, Boston, USA from 1973 to 2010, spending a term teaching there in 1975. She was an advocate for international higher education programmes and founded a number of programmes for visiting students from the USA.

== Memberships ==
Watkins was a Liveryman and senior steward of the Worshipful Company of Scientific Instrument Makers, and became a Freeman of the City of London. She was elected a Life Fellow of the Royal Society of Arts and a Fellow and active member of the Institution of Electrical Engineers. She was a long-term member of the Women's Engineering Society (WES) and took an active part in the London Branch. She played a key part in WES's submission to the Finniston Enquiry, heading up the education sections of the submission.

Watkins was a driving force in its work encouraging schoolgirls to consider engineering as a career, and acted as WES's careers officer for some years. She was elected WES President from 1980 to 1981, succeeding Veronica Milligan and being succeeded by Rosemary West. In 1981, she gave the annual Verena Holmes lecture entitled Chips for the Disabled, which examined how engineering could help support people living with disabilities. In 1984, she donated the Watkins Medal to WES to be awarded to the best female engineering graduate of the year. She held tea parties for women engineering students at City University and encouraged them to join WES for the support it could offer their careers.

== Personal life ==
On 22 February 1946, Ziff married Flight lieutenant Thomas "Tom" Brown Watkins (1921–1961), of the Royal Air Force and Leith, at St Saviour's Church, Lewisham. He was a fellow engineering student at Edinburgh and had returned from active service in the Second World War. In 1947, they made their home in Sydenham, joined by her younger sister, who had survived the war, and her mother-in-law. The couple had two sons, born in 1947 and 1951. She took his surname, and was often called Maria rather than Marja from this period onwards.

== Death ==
Maria Watkins died in on 2 September 2010 at Highgate, London, and was cremated on 13 September 2010. Her obituary was published in The Woman Engineer journal.
