= Gwendolen Sergant =

Major and engineer in Women's Royal Army Corps

Gwendolen Alice Sergant
- Born: 17 March 1926; Sussex, England
- Died: 1 June 1979 (aged 53)
- Education: Loughborough College; Rheostatic Co.
- Spouse: John Howard

Gwendolen Sergant (17 March 1926 - 1 June 1979) was a Major and engineer in the Women's Royal Army Corps for over twenty years, serving with the Royal Electrical and Mechanical Engineers. One of her appointments involved being in charge of the British army's whole fleet of 160,000 vehicles. She was President of the Women's Engineering Society from 1974 to 1975.

== Early life and education ==
Gwendolen Sergant was born on 17 March 1926 in Sussex into an engineering family. She was known to friends as 'Bunty'. Her father had an agricultural engineering business, which she helped out with from childhood.

She studied for a diploma in mechanical engineering at Loughborough College in 1943, but was unable to finish the course because her father fell ill.

She continued her engineering training as an apprentice at the Rheostatic Company, Slough, during which time she gained a B.Sc. in Mechanical Engineering.

== Career ==
In 1948 Sergant joined Thorn Electrical Industries where she worked for 2 years designing fluorescent lighting.

In 1953 she took a commission as an engineer in the Women's Royal Army Corps. She spent the next 20 years working with the Royal Electrical and Mechanical Engineers (REME), rising to the rank of Major in 1964. She worked all over the world, including Singapore, Hong Kong, Australia, New Zealand, and Gibraltar. She was also posted to the British Army of the Rhine (BAOR), Germany.

She became Officer-in-charge of General Engineering REME 43 Command Workshop in Aldershot in 1969, where she was in charge of 160,000 vehicles and 400 civilian craftsmen. It was while serving in the army that she acquired the nickname 'Bunty'.

After her marriage she became assistant secretary to the Appointments Board of the University of Cambridge. This work included visiting industrial firms and military organisations in order to seek out opportunities for engineering graduates. In the 1977 issue of the Women's Engineering Society journal, the Woman Engineer, she described a visit to the Shell/Esso gas platform in the North Sea.

== Memberships ==
Sergant joined the Women's Engineering Society in 1944, was elected to the Council in 1959 and was president from 1974 to 1975 under her married name of Howard. She succeeded Peggy Hodges and was succeeded in the role by Henrietta Bussell.

In 1975, she led a group from WES to the fourth International Conference of Women Engineers and Scientists (ICWES) in Cracow, Poland.

In 1979 she was promoted to Fellowship of the Institution of Mechanical Engineers and was also elected as a Fellow of Lucy Cavendish College, Cambridge.

== Personal life ==
In 1973 Gwendolen Sergant married Lt Cdr John Howard in Aldershot, who she first met while studying at Loughborough College. After their wedding, they both resigned their commissions and set up a garage and coachworks in Sussex. This was not successful because of an oil crisis, which forced them to give up the business. She then obtained her post at the University of Cambridge.

== Awards ==
BSc, C.Eng, FIMech.E., A.M.B.I.M.
