= Lillian Murad =

American Textile Designer and the 2nd President of the Society for Women Engineers

- Born: 29 May 1917; Tbilisi, Georgia
- Died: March 22, 2004 (aged 86)
- Education: Pratt University, chemical engineering BSc; New York University Graduate Studies
- Spouse: Rostom Bablanian (m. 1955–2004)
- Engineering career
- Discipline: Chemical Engineering
- Institutions: The Society of Women Engineers
- Employer(s): Murad Textile Print Works; Muratex Chemicals; Pacific Food Products, Inc.
- Awards: Tau Beta Pi Women's Badge

Lilian G. Murad (May 29, 1917 – March 22, 2004) was an American textile designer and the second president of The Society of Women Engineers (1952–1953).

== Early life and education ==
Lillian G. Murad was born 29 May 1917 in Tbilisi, Georgia to Levon Murad and Veronica Arvanian. There was turbulance in the region at this time due to the Armenian genocide. Murad grew up in France and studied music at the Conservatory of Music in Nice where she won first prize in Piano in 1933. After the family moved to New York Murad continued her musical, theatrical and dance studies until 1942.

Murad changed course however and began studying Chemical Engineering at Pratt University. In 1947 she was awarded the Tau Beta Pi Women's Badge. In 1948, Murad was the first woman to be awarded a Bachelors degree in Chemical Engineering from Pratt University. She belonged to the Institute's Honorary Association of Engineers. She continued her studies by pursuing graduate education at New York University.

== Career ==
Murad's first role was as a junior engineer at Pacific Food Products Inc. in Brooklyn, New York. She soon left to start her own business, Muratex Chemicals, which she owned and managed between 1949 and 1953. Her firm shared premises with Murad Textile Print works Inc. on Mercer Street, where she was Assistant Manager and Vice President between 1948 and 1955.

During this time Murad also worked freelance, creating textile designs that were featured in Interior Design Magazine. She also developed novel ways to water based pigment binders, a technique which influenced the popularisation of the use of gilded fabrics in interior and fashion fabrics alike.

Inspired by the British Women's Engineering Society (WES), a group of women including Murad established an American counterpart, The Society of Women Engineers (SWE). She served as the first chair of the finance committee, became a vice president and then served as the second president in 1952–53 after Beatrice Hicks. She was succeeded by Katharine Stinson. She was elected a member of WES in 1951, and was a member of the American Institute of Chemical Engineers.

In 1971, Murad spoke at the third International Conference of Women Engineers and Scientists, held in Turin, Italy, on the implications of contemporary education on women, as part of a section on Women's Professional and Family Duties.

== Personal life ==
In 1955, she married Rostom Bablanian a microbiologist at the Downstate Medical Centre in Brooklyn.

Murad taught Chemistry at Oyster Bay High School and continued to enjoy Armenian music, dance and theatre throughout her life. She was fluent in multiple languages, including English, French, German, Russian and Armenian.

She died in 2004, aged 87.
