= Deborah Ajakaiye =

Nigerian geophysicist

- Born: Deborah Enilo Ajakaiye; 1940 (age 85–86); Plateau State, Northern Nigeria
- Occupation: Geophysicist
- Known for: First female physics professor in Africa

Deborah Enilo Ajakaiye was born in 1940 in Plateau State in Northern Nigeria, and is a Nigerian geophysicist. She is the first female physics professor in Africa and her work in geophysics has played an important role in mining in Nigeria.

== Early life and education ==
Ajakaiye was born in 1940 in the city of Jos, the capital of Plateau State in the northern region of Nigeria. She was the fifth of six children. Her parents believed in equal education of the sexes and distributed household chores among both the male and female children. In 1962 she is an alumna of University of Ibadan with a degree in physics. She received a master's degree at the University of Birmingham in England, and in 1970 received her Ph.D. in geophysics from Ahmadu Bello University in Nigeria. Originally interested in mathematics, Ajakaiye says she chose to pursue geophysics because she believed it could help her country.

Ajakaiye attended the Second International Conference of Women Engineers and Scientists held in Cambridge in 1967. A picture of her at the conference banquet, alongside fellow Nigerian physicist Ebun Adegbohungbe, was published in The Woman Engineer's report of the conference in July 1967. In 1971, she spoke at the third ICWES conference in Turin, giving a paper on women scientists and engineers in Nigeria, sharing a platform with Letitia Obeng and Grace Hopper.

== Career ==
Ajakaiye became the first female professor of physics in Africa in 1980. She has taught at Ahmadu Bello University and the University of Jos, serving as the dean of natural sciences at the latter. Her work with geovisualization has been used to locate both mineral deposits and groundwater in Nigeria. She has also created a gravity map of Nigeria, working with several of her female students. After retirement she devoted her time to a Nigeria-based charity, Christian Care for Widows, Widowers, the Aged and Orphans (CCWA), which she had founded in 1991.

== Awards ==
Ajakaiye has been recognized for both her scientific advancements and her aid to the nation of Nigeria. The Nigerian Mining and Geosciences Society honored her for her work, making her the first woman to receive the award. She was also the first black African to be named a fellow of the Geological Society of London. In 2001 to 2004, Ajakaiye was a member of the Advisory Council of the American Association of Petroleum Geologists (AAPG) and by election, became AAPGs Africa Region President from 2005 to 2007, making her the first African to win the AAPG award in 2011.

Books and Publications

- Course Manual and Atlas of Structural Styles on Reflection Profiles from the Niger Delta
- A Bouguer Gravity Map of Nigeria
- A Gravity Interpretation of the Liruei Younger Granite Ring Complex of Northern Nigeria
- Mass Movements in Hilly Areas (with Examples from Nigeria)
- Gamma-ray spectrometric analyses of some Nigerian rock samples
- Assessment of Education/Research in Basic Science and Science and Technology in Africa
- Joints on the Jos Plateau
- Application of geophysical methods to groundwater exploration in northern Nigeria
- Evidence of tectonic control of mineralization in Nigeria from lineament density analysis A Landsat-study
- The July 28, 1984 southwestern Nigeria earthquake and its implications for the understanding of the tectonic structure of Nigeria
- Gravity control network at airports in Nigeria

== See also ==
- Timeline of women in science
