= May Maple =

British electrical engineer (1914–2012)

May Maple FIEE CEng FRSCA
- Born: May Newby; 8 August 1914; Gateshead, England
- Died: August 19, 2012 (aged 98)
- Education: Acton Technical College
- Awards: Isabel Hardwich medal
- Scientific career
- Fields: Engineering
- Workplaces: Edmundsons Electricity Corporation; British Electricity Authority; Central Electricity Generating Board

May Maple CEng FIEE (8 August 1914 – 19 August 2012) was a British electrical engineer and a president of the Women's Engineering Society. She was elected a fellow of the Institution of Electrical Engineers in 1969.

== Early life and education ==
May was born on 8 August 1914 in Gateshead to Alfred Newby, a master mariner, and Florence May Newby (née Grundy).

Maple was educated at Calder High School in Liverpool and studied for a Higher National Certificate in electrical engineering at Acton Technical College, which later became Brunel University of London. She completed the coursework at night school over a five-year period, while working for Edmundsons Electricity Corporation as a purchasing officer.

== Engineering career ==
Maple moved to a role as a contracts officer with the British Electricity Authority when that body was formed under the Electricity Act of 1947, and was promoted to 3nd Assistant Engineer in 1953. By 1965, she was the only woman of four contracts officers in the Central Electricity Generating Board. In 1969, she was head of the electrical section.

Maple was elected vice president of the Women's Engineering Society in 1967, and served as president from 1970 until 1971. May succeeded Elizabeth Laverick in the role and was succeeded in turn by Peggy Hodges.

Maple gave a paper on issues to consider during transportation of heavy indivisible loads to the 3rd International Conference of Women Engineers and Scientists, held in Turin in 1971.

== Honours and awards ==
In 1955 Maple was named an associate member of the Institution of Electrical Engineers, and in 1969 she was named a fellow.

She was awarded the Isabel Hardwich medal in 1991.

In 2024, Maple's work was commemorated by a virtual blue plaque to celebrate the history of the Women's Engineering Society and the Electrical Association for Women.

== Personal life ==
May Newby married William Maple in 1939. She died, aged 98, on 19 August 2012.
