= Betty Lou Bailey =

American engineer

- Born: 1928; Chicago, IL
- Died: November 13, 2007 (aged 78–79)
- Education: University of Illinois, Penn State
- Occupation: Mechanical Engineer

Betty Lou Bailey (1929 – 2007) was a General Electric Company mechanical engineer from the United States. She held a patent for an aircraft variable exhaust nozzle. The invention operated so that one would vary both the throat and the exit diameters for the hot gas flows. In honor of her legacy, the Society of Women Engineers named a scholarship after her. To date, that scholarship is still being distributed to eligible female graduate students who pursue a career in engineering.

Bailey was the first female member of the Engineering Society of Cincinnati. She later served as the chair of its Guidance Committee.

== Early life ==
Bailey was the youngest of five children. She excelled in math and science in high school. Although her father was a civil engineer, it was her oldest sister Helen and her husband Paul who influenced Bailey to choose a career in engineering. Paul sold welding machines and taught Helen to weld. Helen taught welding to various men and women during World War II. Although a number of Helen's female welding students scored higher than the male students, all of the men were placed first before the women, regardless of the score. So, between Betty Lou Bailey's junior and senior years in high school, Helen suggested that Betty Lou should go into engineering. Their brother Clark had rejected engineering as a career which both sisters felt was one of the reasons that their father was supportive of young Betty's career choice.

== Education ==
Bailey attended the undergraduate program in mechanical engineering at the University of Illinois a year early, at the age of seventeen. By the time she finished her freshman year, both of Bailey's parents had died. In 1950, Bailey graduated with University Honors. In her graduating class of approximately 700 engineers, she was the only female engineer. In her sorority, she was one out of a total of two engineers (the other one was a civil engineer). In 1967, she graduated from the Penn State Graduate Center in King of Prussia with a Masters in the Engineering Science, although she was not impressed by the course or teaching.

== Career and contributions ==
Bailey held positions at General Electric Company as a testing, design, and systems engineer in their Large Jet Engine Department, Gas Turbine Department, and its Valley Forge Space Technology Center. She progressed in her work, from household appliances, to steam turbines and jet engineers, and finally to the NASA Nimbus weather satellite project. During her initial job interview with GE, which occurred before she graduated from the University of Illinois, she remarked that, "I wanted to work for a company where engineers counted and were regarded as important".

In addition to her work, Bailey started a math tournament in Cincinnati for high school students.

== Exhaust nozzle ==
During her tenure at General Electric, Bailey patented an exhaust nozzle in Evendale. She initiated the format that GE used for getting bids on their air emission tests.

The company had the 7F gas turbine, which was the first-of-its-kind. She was working at the roof of the building and was familiar with enough with the piping to recognize a leak out of the gas line from the gas valve compartment. The company was losing a lot of gas that had already been counted as going into the turbine. Bailey noted the failed efficiency. That gas leak was going into the incoming gas in the machine, so the carbon monoxide was destroying the seal. All six weeks of prior combustion tests that the employees had been running on the machine had to be discarded. Her invention straightened out the problem, and they passed the tests after that. This was important because the company's gas turbine was the first of its kind and would therefore need to pass all of its tests.

== Societies ==
Bailey joined the Society of Women Engineers (SWE) in 1951, where she was an officer of the Philadelphia section and served on the SWE Executive Committee. In 1985, she was elected to the SWE College of Fellows. A SWE endowed scholarship was established in Bailey’s name in 2011.

She was the first female member of the Engineering Society of Cincinnati and served as the chair of its Guidance Committee. She has also served on national committees for the National Society of Professional Engineers, the Engineers Joint Council, and the American Society for Engineering Education.

In 1964, Bailey attended the first International Conference of Women Engineers and Scientists Conference in New York. She travelled to Britain for the second ICWES conference in Cambridge in 1967, where amongst other things, she was taught how to wear a sari by Indian engineer K. K. Khubchandani alongside British engineers Rose Winslade, Cicely Thompson, Hettie Bussell and US engineer Louise Davies.

== Personal life and death ==
Bailey was an active environmentalist. She enjoyed sewing. She was active and loved to travel, canoe, cycle, and hike. She walked the entire Appalachian Trail in segments over a few years. Bailey was a member of the Adirondack Mountain Club (ADK). In 2004 she received their highest award for her work in monitoring hydropower applications to the Federal Regulatory Commission. She did work in dam-licensing that helped ensure that sufficient water was released downstream to support river life and water recreation.

Bailey died suddenly on November 13, 2007, during an ADK cycling trip.
