= Miriam Muwanga =

First woman engineer in Uganda

- Died: 10 May 1975; Kampala, Uganda
- Education: John Dalton College of Technology
- Occupation: Electrical engineer
- Organization: Women's Engineering Society

Miriam Sebaggala, born Miriam Muwanga (died 10 May 1975) was an electrical engineer from Uganda, who came to prominence as a member of the Women's Engineering Society. After training in England, she returned to Uganda and worked in a variety of roles for the Ugandan Electricity Board, as well as editing the organisation's journal.

== Biography ==
Whilst little is known about Muwanga's early life, she joined the Women's Engineering Society (WES) in 1965 as a graduate member. She was working at Associated Electronics Industries, which later became Metropolitan Vickers, as a special trainee, whilst studying at John Dalton College of Technology, now Manchester Metropolitan University, for a Higher National Certificate. During her time there she worked on the electrics of suburban trams. Her obituary in The Woman Engineer stated that she chose electrical engineering over nursing as her career due to her "great desire to give herself to help others ... her country and her people". In 1968 she became a member of the Institute of Electrical Engineers. Active in the WES, in 1971 she was a committee member of the WES's London branch. She also worked at the Second International Conference of Women Engineers and Scientists, which was held in Cambridge, as well as at the third conference in Turin.

On her return to Uganda she worked for the Ugandan Electricity Board as an Electricity Design Assistant, then later as a Transmission Engineer and Street Lighting Supervisor. In 1974, she became the editor of the Journal of the Uganda Electricity Board. Whilst Proscovia Margaret Njuki is often described as Uganda's first female electrical engineer, Muwanga was active in the field several years earlier.

== Personal life ==
Muwanga married in 1968 and her daughter, Kulabata, was born on 1 September 1974. She died on 10 May 1975 in a car crash in Kampala, Uganda, a crash which hospitalised her baby daughter.

== See also ==
- Winnie Byanyima
