= Henrietta Bussell =

British railway engineer

Henrietta (Hettie) Langdale Bussell
- Born: 19 February 1917; London, England
- Died: December 1996 (aged 79); Colchester, England
- Organization: Women's Engineering Society
- Known for: Railway engineering

Henrietta (Hettie) Langdale Bussell (19 February 1917 – December 1996) was Britain's first female railway engineer. She served as the president of the Women's Engineering Society from 1976 to 1977.

== Early life and education ==
Bussell was born in London, but moved to Newport, Monmouthshire at age 12 with her family. There she won a scholarship to attend a new grammar school in Monmouthshire where she developed a love for maths and physics.

== Finding work ==
Bussell left school in 1933 during the Great Depression, a time where it was difficult to find work. She sat a Civil Service entrance exam in 1934, where she did not gain one of the 4 vacancies on offer to 2,000 testers. That same year, she came 2nd in an exam to join Great Western Railway, where only the first place recipient claimed entry to the company.

However, Great Western Railway soon after had a vacancy in Cardiff in the Drawing Office, part of the Civil Engineering Department. Bussell contacted the company to remind them of her 2nd place exam finish. From this, she was able to gain a position as a tracer in August 1934.

== Career and interests ==
In 1942, the GWR Chief Civil Engineer appointed Bussell as Junior Technical Staff as Draughtsman (female).

Bussell transferred to British Rail, where she was promoted to various roles:

- Assistant Draughtsman in 1948
- Technical Assistant in 1957
- Engineering Assistant in 1966
- Senior Engineering Assistant in 1971

Bussell was a member of the British Railway's Management Staff.

Bussell had a great interest in tunneling works, particularly the Channel Tunnel.

== Advocacy for women in engineering ==
Bussell was an advocate for getting women involved in engineering.

Bussell joined the Women’s Engineering Society in 1951 and became an active member in the London branch. She joined the Society's council in 1961 before becoming President from 1976–77, succeeding Gwendolen 'Bunty' Sergant and being succeeded by Veronica Milligan.

She attended the second International Conference of Women Engineers and Scientists conference in Cambridge in 1967, where amongst other things, she was taught how to wear a sari by Indian engineer K. K. Khubchandani alongside fellow WES members and engineers Rose Winslade, Cicely Thompson, and US delegates Louise Davies and Betty Lou Bailey. Bussell submitted a paper on the Channel Tunnel to the third International Conference of Women Engineers and Scientists conference held in Turin in 1971.

Bussell became seriously ill in 1989 and died in Colchester in 1996.
