= Peggy Hodges =

British engineer

- Born: Peggy Lilian Hodges; 11 June 1921; London, England, United Kingdom
- Died: 21 November 2008 (aged 87); Buckinghamshire, England, United Kingdom
- Education: Girton College, Cambridge
- Occupations: Engineer, mathematician, physicist
- Known for: Guided weapons technology
- Awards: Whitney Straight Award 1970; OBE 1972

Peggy Lilian Hodges OBE FRAeS FIMA (11 June 1921 – 21 November 2008) was a British engineer who worked on guided missile technology at GEC Marconi.

== Early life and education ==
Hodges was born in Lewisham, south east London on 11 June 1921 before moving to Westcliff-on-Sea where she was educated at Westcliff High School for Girls. Hodges read Natural Sciences at Girton College, Cambridge and graduated with an Honours degree in 1942.

== Engineering career ==
After graduation Hodges began her career at Standard Telephone and Cables (STC) as a Junior Radio Engineer in the Radio Division, where she worked on airborne communications and the ILS blind beacon landing equipment.

In 1950 Hodges joined the GEC Applied Electronics Laboratories at Stanmore, Middlesex, where she worked as a microwave and systems engineer, working on guided weapons. Hodges became Systems Manager and then Project Manager of the Guided Weapons Project (Sea Dart Guidance) in the Guided Weapons Division. Among other projects, Hodges worked in the Underwater Weapons Division on trials planning and analysis for air-launched guided torpedoes, and later worked on simulation, identifying problems affecting guided weapons systems. She was finally appointed Simulation Manager.

== Retirement and later work ==
After her retirement in 1981, Hodges returned to professional work as a general systems consultant in the Guided Weapons Division of Marconi Space and Defence Systems (MSDS), Stanmore. Hodges was President of the Caroline Haslett Trust, which encourages young women to enter the engineering profession, and a member and supporter of Soroptimist International.

== Work for the Women's Engineering Society ==
Hodges was an active member of the Women's Engineering Society (WES), which she joined in 1960. She held various offices including Member of Council and Careers Officer, and was President of WES from 1971 to 1973. She succeeded May Maple in the role and was in turn succeeded by Gwendolen 'Bunty' Howard. Hodges gave the WES Verena Holmes Lecture entitled ‘Control – Feedback completes the circle’.

== Awards and recognition ==
In 1969, Hodges was elected a Fellow of the Royal Aeronautical Society, one of three women Fellows at the time, and was also a member of the Astronautics and Guided Flight Committee. She was a Fellow of the Institute of Mathematics and its Applications (IMA) and a member of its council from 1971 to 1973. Between 1971 and 1975 Hodges was a member of the Engineering Design Advisory Committee (EDAC) and a member of the Science Research Council Control and Instrumentation Sub-Committee between 1980 and 1982. She was elected an Honorary Fellow of the IEEIE (now part of the Institution of Engineering and Technology) in 1994.

Hodges won the Whitney Straight Award in 1970 for outstanding achievement in aviation which was presented by Prince Charles and in the same year appeared in a TV film ‘Made In Britain’ concerned with a “Woman in a Man’s World”. She was awarded an OBE in the 1972 Birthday Honours for her contribution to guided weapons technology.

Hodges' personal papers are deposited in the IET Archives.

== Legacy ==
A legacy in Hodges will enabled the establishment of the Peggy Hodges Prize, which was awarded to the highest performing female student in second year exams at the University of Hertfordshire's MEng/BEng degree.
