= Madeleine Nobbs =

British building services engineer

Madeleine Marie Nobbs (14 December 1914 – 10 December 1970) was a building services engineer, responsible for the reprovision of services to the Old Bailey in London after the Second World War, and president of the Women's Engineering Society (1959–60).

== Life ==
Nobbs started her working life as a shorthand typist but very much felt that this was the "wrong job" for her. Her father, Walter William Nobbs, was a well known London heating and ventilation engineer, who had worked on many London buildings, including New County Hall for the (then) London County Council, the new premises for the RIBA and the headquarters of the (then IEE) at Savoy Hill, as well as being President of the Institution of Heating and Ventilating Engineers in 1920, and his father was a civil engineer. This family history, and a belief that her personal talents lay in mathematics and geometry, encouraged Madeleine, having read a book about technical drawing, to declare she wished to be an engineer. Her father was somewhat skeptical, as he feared that the drinking culture of consulting engineering would not be conducive to progression by his daughter. However, after her mother (Francoise Leonie Thebault) met with Adria Buchanan, the first women to become a member of the Institution of Heating and Ventilating Engineers, she interceded, telling her husband "with a charming smile and in her delightful French accent" that he could no longer refuse to support his daughter in her ambition.

Madeleine persuaded a firm of heating and ventilation engineers that she would be suited to the drawing office, where she started as a tracer (tracing architectural drawings to copy them and add details for heating and ventilating systems). Her studies at Borough Polytechnic enabled her to progress to H&V work for an architect’s office including estimating and supervising installation.

During the WW2 she designed air raid shelters, factories and boat ventilation. In her spare time, she drove an ambulance. She went on to do a variety of jobs that allowed her to get practical bench and site experience until she was a fully qualified engineer and joined her father’s firm as a junior partner in 1945. Her father died in 1951, whilst engaged upon a major contract for the rebuilding of the Central Criminal Court, Old Bailey after war damage, so Madeleine stepped up to become senior partner of W. J. Perkins & Partners, Consulting Engineers, and take over the firm on her own account and completed the contract.

== Women's Engineering Society ==
She joined the Women’s Engineering Society in 1941 and was soon active on the council, running the London Branch (1950–52), and becoming president in 1959. She succeeded Marjorie Bell in the role and was succeeded in turn by Isabel Hardwich. She contributed many papers on heating and ventilation to The Woman Engineer and was active as a full member of a number of other engineering institutions.

Although she was unable to attend the inaugural International Conference of Women Engineers and Scientists (ICWES) in New York in 1964, she did produce a most detailed survey of women engineers in the UK for the Congress. Her work was cited by the survey by the Institution of Civil Engineers in 1971.

== Personal life ==
Nobbs married Denis Moody, also an engineer, in 1961. After Moody's death a few years later, she immersed herself in major building work to convert an old barn in Ipsden, Oxfordshire, into a home, doing most of the work herself. Nobbs died suddenly at the age of 56 in 1970.
