= Cicely Thompson =

Nuclear power engineer

- Cicely Thompson, from a 1965 profile in The Guardian
- Born: Jane Cicely Thompson; 9 June 1919
- Died: 3 February 2008 (aged 88)
- Education: Girton College
- Occupation: Nuclear engineer

Cicely Thompson M.B.E. (9 June 1919 – 3 February 2008) was a nuclear engineer.

== Early life ==
She was born Jane Cecily Thompson on 9 June 1919 in Great Ouseburn, England, to James Osbert Thompson and Jane Harrision Highmoor. Her father was an architect-surveyor.

== Education ==
Thompson studied mathematics at Girton College, Cambridge. She took up practical engineering when she joined the Leicester Electricity Service, beginning a career in power station development and design.

== Career ==
In 1956, Thompson joined the Associated Electrical Industries John Thompson Group (AEIJTG) and was the only woman on the team designing two nuclear power stations for the Central Electricity Authority, including Hinckley Point B and later the Dungeness power station.

In 1958, she joined the Institution of Electrical Engineers and became a Fellow in 1986.

In 1980, she worked as a project engineer at the Nuclear Power Co (Risley). She was awarded an M.B.E. in 1980 for her work in the nuclear industry.

== Supporting women in engineering ==
Thompson joined the Women's Engineering Society (WES) in 1947. In 1972, Thompson toured Britain delivering the Verena Holmes lectures, designed to encourage more girls to take up engineering as a career.

Between 1977 and 1981 Thompson was a committee member of the Manchester branch of the Women's Engineering Society. She was elected president of WES in 1963 and 1965, succeeding Isabel Hardwich in the role in 1963. Thompson was unable to fulfill the two full years in post due to working in Italy, and was replaced by Dorothy Cridland, but resumed the Presidency in 1965.

She spoke at the first International Conference of Women Engineers and Scientists (ICWES) in New York on a panel which included Australian telecommunications engineer Olwen Wooster and attended the second ICWES conference in Cambridge in 1967, where amongst other things, she was taught how to wear a sari by Indian engineer K. K. Khubchandani alongside fellow WES members and engineers Rose Winslade, Hettie Bussell, and US delegates Louise Davies and Betty Lou Bailey.

In 1989 she published a history of the Women's Engineering Society and in 1990 was awarded the Isabel Hardwich Medal.

She was also elected a member of the American Society of Women Engineers.

Cicely Thompson died on 3 February 2008, and left a legacy to WES.
