= Katharine Stinson =

American aeronautical engineer

- Born: September 18, 1917; Fuquay Varina, North Carolina
- Died: July 29, 2001 (aged 83); Pinehurst, North Carolina
- Education: North Carolina State University
- Engineering career
- Discipline: aeronautical engineering
- Employer: Federal Aviation Administration
- Projects: air worthiness
- Significant design: supersonic transport standards
- Awards: FAA Sustained Performance Award (1961), Distinguished Women in the Aerospace Industry Award (1984), the Institute of Aeronautics and Astronautics' Aviation Pioneer of the Year and Aerospace Engineer of the Year awards (1987 and 1988).

Katharine Stinson (1917–2001) was an American aeronautical engineer and the Federal Aviation Administration's first female engineer.

== Early life ==
Born in Fuquay-Varina, North Carolina, 14 years after the Wright Brothers made their first flight on North Carolina's Outer Banks, Stinson loved airplanes. A ride from famed aviator Eddie Stinson (no relation) when she was 10 years old solidified her goal of learning to fly.

While working as a mechanic's assistant at the Raleigh Municipal Airport at age 15, Stinson met Amelia Earhart. When Stinson told Earhart about her flight training, Earhart encouraged her to study engineering instead, telling her that she would never make enough money as a pilot.

== Education ==
Stinson took Earhart's advice, and enrolled in physics classes in high school and applied to the engineering program at North Carolina State College.

Stinson's 1936 application to the engineering school was declined by Dean Wallace Riddick who met with her explaining that the college would not accept women as freshmen. Stinson instead accepted a scholarship to nearby Meredith College where she completed all 48 required credit hours in a single year. Women engineer supporter Blake R Van Leer admitted her and encouraged other women to join the engineering program. She enrolled in the engineering program the following fall as one of the few female students at the college and the only female in the engineering department. She graduated in 1941 with a bachelor's degree in Mechanical Engineering with an Aeronautical option, becoming the first woman to do so at N.C. State, and one of just five women in the country that year to earn a degree in engineering or architecture.

== Career ==
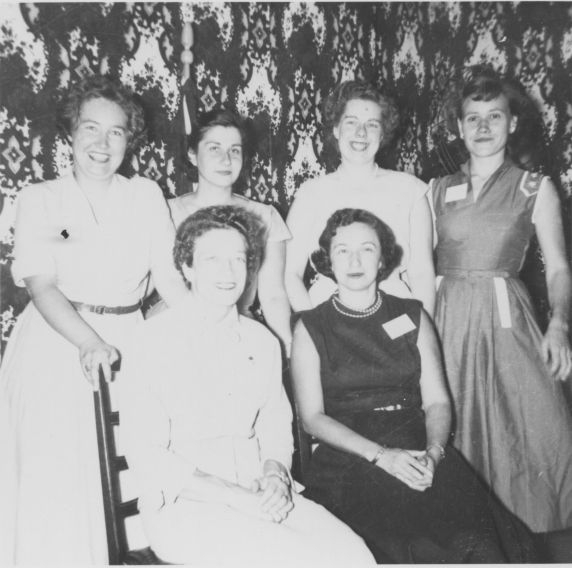
Society of Women Engineers 1953

Following graduation, Stinson was the first female engineer hired by the Civil Aeronautics Administration. During her 32-year career, she specialized in aircraft safety, developing standards for supersonic transports which were used to create the Concorde, and pioneering distribution of aircraft structural issues. She retired from the Federal Aviation Administration in 1974 as Technical Assistant to the Chief of Aircraft Engineering.

During her career, she was active in the Ninety-Nines: International Organization of Women Pilots and the Society of Women Engineers which she helped found. Stinson was the third President of SWE (1953–55) preceded by Lillian Murad and succeeded by Lois Graham. SWE started as a small organization and quickly became a national organization with sections coast-to-coast. She also served on President Lyndon Johnson's Women's Advisory Committee on Aviation from 1964 to 1970 and served as an officer in the Institute of Aeronautical Sciences. Stinson also belonged to the Soroptimist Club, serving as president from 1970 to 1972.

In 1967, Stinson attended the second International Conference of Women Engineers and Scientists (ICWES) in Cambridge, UK, and spoke about the role of aircraft in food production.

In 1997 North Carolina State University named her a distinguished alumnus and named Katharine Stinson Drive on campus in her honor.

== Awards ==
Sources:

- FAA Sustained Performance Award (1961)
- North Carolina State University College of Engineering Distinguished Alumni (1977, first woman to receive the honor)
- Distinguished Women in the Aerospace Industry Award (1984)
- Institute of Aeronautics and Astronautics' Aviation Pioneer of the Year
- Aerospace Engineer of the Year awards (1987 and 1988)
