= Ila Ghose =

West Bengal's first woman engineer (1930–2019)

Ila Ghose (née Majumdar) (24 July 1930 - 11 December 2019) was a mechanical engineer and West Bengal's first woman engineer. She was the first female alumna of the Bengal Engineering College.

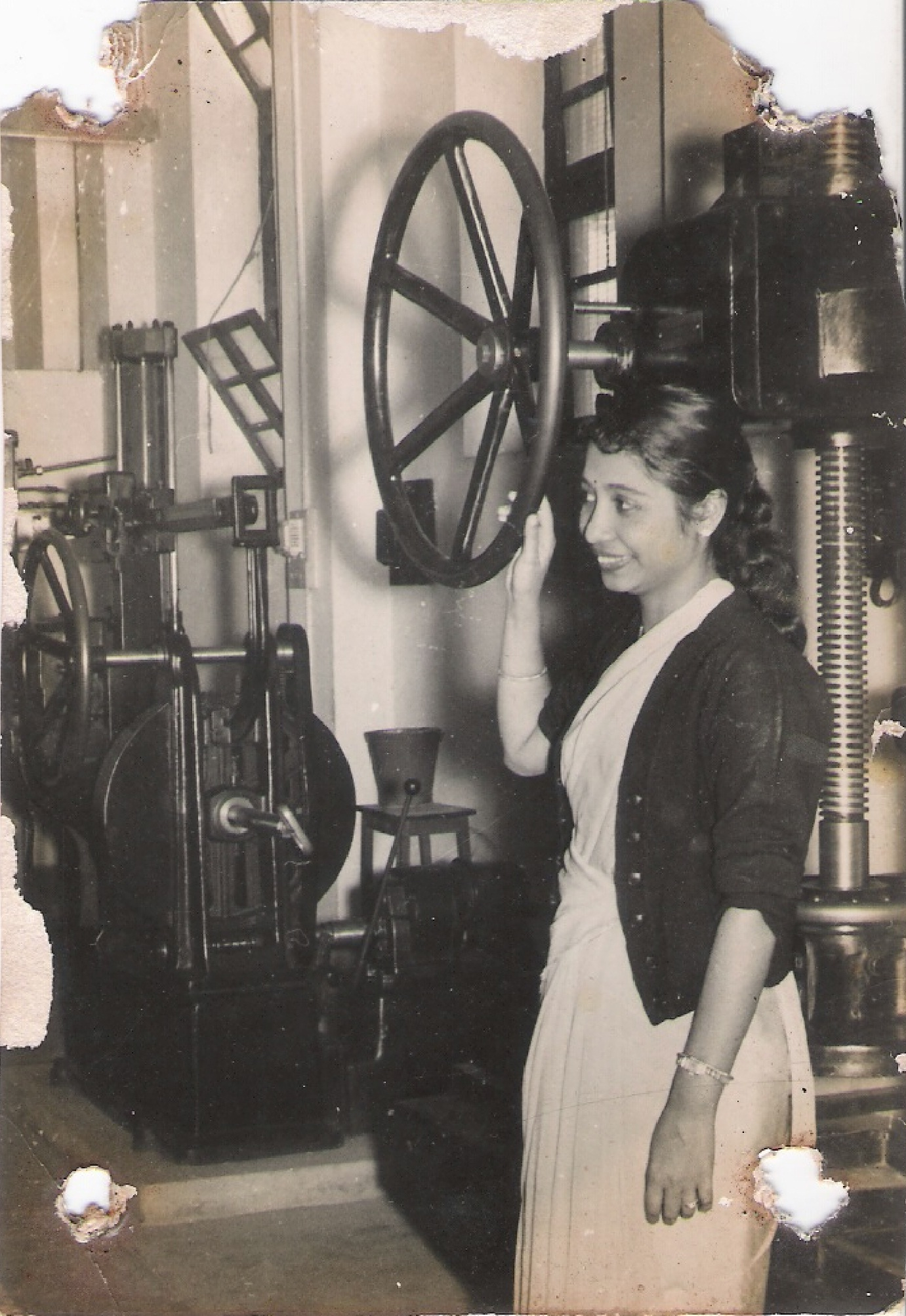
Ila Ghose in circa 1947 (née Majumdar)

== Early life and education ==
Ila Majumdar was born in the Madaripur subdivision, Faridpur district, East Bengal in 1930. She was one of six sisters and two brothers. Her father, Jatindra Kumar Majumdar, was a deputy magistrate and her mother was a housewife. From a young age her interest in engineering was recognised. The family moved to West Bengal, before moving to Calcutta in 1945. She was admitted to study at the Bengal Engineering College, where there was only one other woman in her cohort. In an interview in The Telegraph (India) in 2008, she said "There was only one other woman in the entire batch. The boys were shocked, but we soon became good friends. We would chat and crack jokes with them and cheer them on at cricket matches. Never did we feel uncomfortable." Her fellow female student dropped out after one year, making her the first woman to graduate from the college. She graduated in 1951.

== Career ==
For her postgraduate training, she travelled to the United Kingdom to work for Glasgow-based company Barr and Stroud. Once back in India, she worked in an ordnance factory in Dehra Dun, before taking up a lecturer's post at Delhi Polytechnic in 1955. After her marriage, she moved back to Calcutta where she became a lecturer at the Institute of Jute Technology, followed by the principal of the Women's Polytechnic on Gariahat Road. In 1985, she was approached by UNESCO to set up Mahila Polytechnic in Dhaka, Bangladesh.

In 1967, she attended the second International Conference of Women Engineers and Scientists held in Cambridge, United Kingdom.

In an interview with the Global Alumni Association of Bengali Engineering and Science University, Shibpur, she spoke of the gender bias she faced in her career:

“Of course, I have faced gender bias all the time in my professional life. I think it will take a long time to change the mindset of the society, and there is no other way to bear it. But it hurts when the cases of selection / promotion comes, how the authorities find flimsy excuses not to offer a woman her rightful place as they feel she is not supposed to boss over men. One had to tolerate this.”

== Personal life ==
Ila Majumder married in 1959, taking her husband's surname Ghose. The couple had a son in 1960, lost a daughter to stillbirth in 1963 and had a second son in 1967.
