= Rose Winslade =

British engineer and governor of university college, Nairobi

Rose Winslade OBE
- Winslade talking to the BBC
- Born: 22 July 1919; London, England
- Died: 16 December 1981 (aged 63); London, England
- Other name: Rose Winslade
- Occupation: Engineer
- Employer: Council of Engineering Institutions
- Known for: President of the Women's Engineering Society and a governor of University College, Nairobi.

Rosina Winslade OBE (22 July 1919 – 16 December 1981) was a British engineering manager who became President of the Women's Engineering Society and a governor of University College, Nairobi.

== Early life ==
Winslade was born in London in 1919 to Alice Margaret (née Harris) and Charles James Winslade. She left school at fourteen, starting work in a factory.

== Career ==
She became fascinated by the engineering processes she saw in the factory and decided to make engineering her career.

Winslade joined the Women's Engineering Society in 1946. She was a keen member and became the chair of the London Branch.

Winslade came to notice in 1960 when she was one of two engineers funded by the Caroline Haslett Memorial Trust founded by the British Electricity Authority. They were to investigate the role of female engineers in the USSR. At the time she was a senior sales engineer at Research and Control Instruments Ltd and she was accompanied by Lesley S. Souter who was employed in Harlow by the AEI Research Laboratory.

She continued to work for Research and Control Instruments Ltd becoming an assistant manager in 1960 and between 1962 and 1965 she held a higher managerial position as Joint Manager (Technical) of their electronics division. It was noted that this was unusually high for a woman.

She worked as an Assistant Secretary the Council of Engineering Institutions looking after their overseas links including the British link to the European Federation of National Association of Engineers. In 1969 she was appointed for two years as a Governor of University College, Nairobi. Her first meeting there was held during a three-week visit in April where she also visited other colleges.

== Women's Engineering Society ==
Winslade was employed by the Council of Engineering Institutions in 1966 when she was serving as President of the Women's Engineering Society to which position she was elected on 4 September 1965. At that time the BBC reported that there were 400 women engineers in the UK.

Winslade appeared on the BBC as she reported on a week long second International Conference of Women Engineers and Scientists conference in Cambridge in 1967. The BBC also interviewed Elizabeth Laverick who was to take over from her as WES President. At the conference, she was photographed being taught how to wear a sari by Indian engineer K. K. Khubchandani alongside fellow WES members and engineers Cicely Thompson, Hettie Bussell and US delegates Louise Davies and Betty Lou Bailey.

Winslade was appointed an OBE for services to women in engineering in 1969.
