= Hilda Counts =

American electrical engineer and pioneer

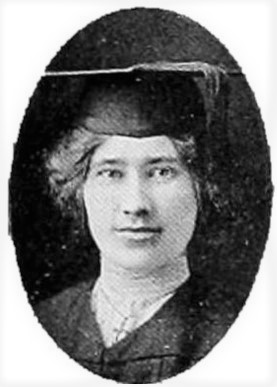
- Born: 16 September 1893; Runnels County, Texas, U.S.
- Died: 17 May 1989 (aged 95); Olney, Maryland, U.S.

Hilda Counts (16 September 1893 – 17 May 1989) was an American electrical engineer and co-founder of the American Society of Women Engineers and Architects. She was the first woman to earn a degree in electrical engineering from the University of Colorado.

== Biography ==
Hilda Counts was born in 1893 in Runnels County, Texas, to Sylvania (née) Whisnant and Thomas Peter Counts. She had a younger brother Oakley Ford. She got an associate degree from the University of Colorado before working as a high school mathematics and physics teacher for two years. She then returned to the university where she studied electrical engineering. She graduated in 1919 as the first woman to do so with that degree. Counts went to work in Westinghouse Electric Corporation until deciding to return again to gain a higher degree. However she married Arthur T. Edgecomb (1867–1936) around 1926 and retired for a number of years.

Counts returned to work after a fourteen-year gap and worked in the Rural Electrification Administration in Washington D.C.

In 1943, Counts became the first woman engineer hired by the Rural Electrification Administration.

She officially retired in 1963 but remained involved in the work until her 80s. Counts died in 1989 age 95.

== Professional organizations ==
In 1919 when Counts worked with Lou Alta Melton, to create an American Society of Women Engineers and Architects they wrote to all US universities with Engineering departments to find how many women were students. The replies were notable for the number which stated "this university does not have and never expects to have any women engineering students". Despite the great number of negative replies it turned out that there were about 200 women students in engineering courses. So the two women announced the establishment of the association, with support from fellow engineering student Elsie Eaves and a number of women joined in 1919 to 1920.

Long term the association did not last but it did foreshadow the US Society of Women Engineers. Counts remained focused on the creation and maintenance of such an organization and in women's education in engineering. She was involved in the founding of the SWE. Counts was also on the board of the District of Columbia Society of Professional Engineers. The Society of Women Engineers has a scholarship in her name, The Pioneer Scholarship, established in memory of Hilda Counts, Elsie Eaves, and Lou Alta Melton.
