= Dorothy Cridland =

English mechanical engineer (1903–1987)

Dorothy May Cridland
- Born: 15 February 1903; Edmonton, England
- Died: 25 May 1987 (aged 84)
- Occupation: Engineer

Dorothy May Cridland (15 February 1903 – 25 May 1987) was an English mechanical engineer, who worked for Leyland Motors and the Institute of Mechanical Engineers over her career. She was president of the Women's Engineering Society (WES) in 1964. She was elected as an associate of the Institution of Mechanical Engineers in 1951.

== Early life and education ==
Cridland was born in Edmonton, north London on 15 February 1903. Her father, Francis Edward John Cridland, was a pharmacist and analytical chemist, and owned his own business. Her mother was Louisa Mary Everingham.

== Career ==
After leaving school, Cridland joined Leyland Motors as a junior technical assistant in the 1930s. During her early years at Leyland she studied a number of technical courses at various institutions, including the Kingston Technical College and the City of London College. She rose up through the company to become the Deputy Regional Manager for the Southern Region and left in 1955.

Between 1955 and 1963 she was a technical editor for the Institute of Mechanical Engineers.

== Memberships ==
Cridland joined the Women's Engineering Society (WES) in 1943, and became an associate member in 1948. Cridland was active in the Women's Engineering Society (WES) from the 1940s onwards, and was elected president in 1964, succeeding Cicely Thompson. Thompson returned to the role in 1965. Cridland later became an honorary member of WES in 1978.

Cridland was also one of the early women to be admitted to the Institute of Mechanical Engineers, being elected an associate in 1951. Cridland was a Freewoman of the City of London.

Cridland died in Maidstone, Kent in 1987.
