= Elsie Eaves =

American engineer (1898–1983)

- Born: May 5, 1898; Idaho Springs, Colorado, United States
- Died: March 27, 1983 (aged 84); Flower Hill, New York
- Education: University of Colorado at Boulder
- Engineering career
- Discipline: Civil
- Institutions: American Society of Civil Engineers; American Association of Cost Engineers; Chi Epsilon fraternity
- Awards: University of Colorado George Norlin Silver Medal

Elsie Eaves (May 5, 1898 – March 27, 1983) was a pioneering American female engineer. She was the first female associate member of the American Society of Civil Engineers (ASCE) and the first female member of the American Association of Cost Engineers (now AACE International; the Association for the Advancement of Cost Engineering).

== Early life and education ==
Eaves was born in Idaho Springs, Colorado, and earned her civil engineering degree at the University of Colorado at Boulder in 1920.

In 1918, Eaves was elected as the first female president of the school’s student engineering society, the Combined Engineers, such an unusual occurrence that the news received national coverage in engineering publications. She supported Lou Alta Melton and Hilda Counts in creating the American Society of Women Engineers and Architects in 1919.

At the age of 22, she was the first woman to earn a degree in civil engineering from the University of Colorado at Boulder. Eaves began her engineering experience before she received her university degree.

== Career ==
Eaves was a draftsman for the United States Bureau of Public Roads in Denver, Colorado, and then the Denver and Rio Grande Western Railroad Company.

She joined the Women's Engineering Society (at the time the only organisation for women engineers in the world) in 1925, and continued as a member throughout her career.

In 1926 Eaves started working for McGraw-Hill in New York City for the Engineering News-Record (ENR) Department. She was also a publication and sales manager of the McGraw-Hill Construction Daily. In 1927, she was the first woman admitted to full membership to the American Society of Civil Engineers. In 1945, she became the manager of Business News.

In 1929, Eaves originated and compiled the first national inventory of municipal and industrial sewage disposal facilities. Next, she compiled statistics on needed construction, which helped revitalize the construction industry during the Great Depression. After World War II, Eaves organized and directed ENR’s measurement of “Post War Planning” by the construction industry that was used as the official progress report of the industry.

In total, she was associated with McGraw-Hill's Engineering News-Record, a weekly trade publication, for 37 years.

She retired in 1963 but continued practicing as an adviser to the National Commission on Urban Affairs on the subject of housing costs. She advised the International Executive Service Corps about construction costs in Iran. In 1967, Eaves attended the second International Conference of Women Engineers and Scientists (ICWES) in Cambridge, UK, and in 1972, she wrote the obituary for fellow engineer, Ruth Shafer, chair of the first ICWES.

In 1974, she received the George Norlin Silver Medal, the highest alumni award given by the University of Colorado and, in 1979, she was the first woman to receive an honorary lifetime membership to the American Association of Cost Engineers.

Eaves was honoured with the Fellow award at the 1980 Society of Women Engineers National Convention (Conference) in Cherry Hill, New Jersey, having been a member of the organisation since 1950.

Elsie Eaves died March 27, 1983, at St. Francis Hospital in Flower Hill, New York, aged 84.

== Achievements ==
- First female president of University of Colorado at Boulder’s student engineering society, the Combined Engineers.
- First Woman to be elected Associate Member, Member, Fellow, Life Member, of the American Society of Civil Engineers.
- First woman and first civil engineer to be elected as Member, American Association of Cost Engineers (originally only chemical engineers eligible), where she became the first woman to be awarded an Honorary Life Membership.
- First woman elected as Chapter Honor Member, Chi Epsilon fraternity.
- First woman to receive the Distinguished Engineering Alumnus Award from the College of Engineering and Applied Science, University of Colorado.
- First woman to receive the Honorary Life Membership Award from the American Association of Cost Engineers.
- First woman to receive the International Executive Service Corps "Service to Country" Award.
- First woman to receive the Award of Merit from the American Association of Cost Engineers.

== Biographical Listings ==
- Who's Who in America, 1978–79, 1980–81
- Who's Who of American Women, 1975 - 1979-80
- Who's Who in Engineering, 1976 EJC
- Engineers of Distinction, Engineers Joint Council
- Kay, Sons & Daughters, Ltd., Dartmouth, Devon, England
- Personalities of America, 1978 ... The Library of Congress, Washington, D. C., 1976
- Video-taped biographical interview, Port Washington, N. Y. Public Library, 1971

== Bibliography ==
- Elsie Eaves (2009). "Civil Engineering". In Layne, Margaret E. (ed.). Women In Engineering: Professional Life. Reston, Virginia: American Society of Civil Engineers Press. ISBN 9780784409916. OCLC 690880818.
