= Premala Sivaprakasapillai Sivasegaram =

Sri Lankan engineer

- Born: 22 April 1942 (age 83); Jaffna, Northern Province, Sri Lanka
- Education: Ladies' College, Colombo
- Alma mater: University of Ceylon; Somerville College, Oxford
- Occupation: engineer
- Known for: first female engineer

Premala Sivaprakasapillai Sivasegaram (née Sivaprakasapillai; Tamil: பிரேமலா சிவப்பிரகாசபிள்ளை சிவசேகரம், romanized: Pirēmalā Civappirakācapiḷḷai Civacēkaram; born 22 April 1942) is a Sri Lankan engineer. She is the country’s first female engineer and the first female civil engineer. She is also one of the prominent members of the Institution of Engineers, Sri Lanka.

In March 2019, she was acknowledged as one of twelve female change-makers in Sri Lanka by the parliament, coinciding with International Women's Day.

== Early life and education ==
Premala Sivaprakasapillai was born on 22 April 1942 in Jaffna Fort in her maternal granduncle’s District Judge quarters. Her father Thambyapillai Sivaprakasapillai was an engineer who worked at the Colombo Port. Her family had lived in Colombo but were forced to move back to their hometown, Jaffna, following the bombing on Colombo Port by the Japanese in 1942 on the eve of Easter Sunday, just days before her birth. The family later returned to Colombo. She had two brothers who also became engineers and they all played with Meccano as children. Her mother had technical drawing skills and worked with her father to draw the plans for a house for the family.

Sivasegaram received her education at the Ladies' College. She was one of the two girls who followed the mathematics stream in her batch. She then entered the engineering faculty at the University of Ceylon in 1960. In 1964 she graduated as the country’s first female engineering undergraduate and the first female engineer in Sri Lanka. After graduating she was appointed as an instructor in the engineering faculty at the university. Her family, particularly her father, were very supportive of her education and career, to the extent of discouraging her marriage until she had completed her education.

== Career ==
In 1965, Premala Sivaprakasapillai received a government scholarship to Somerville College, Oxford enabling her to gain a doctorate degree in structural engineering and on behalf of the college she attended the International Conference of Women Engineers and Scientists in 1967. She was one of nine international women technologists awarded a Caroline Haslett Memorial Fund bursary to assist their attending the conference. Whilst studying there, she joined the British Women's Engineering Society in 1966 and took part in their launch of the first Women in Engineering Year in 1969, with her achievements being highlighted in the speech given by Shirley Williams MP, Minister of State for Education & Science.

During her time in Britain, she married Sivasegaram in December 1968, who was reading for a PhD at Imperial College, London and on a similar scholarship from the Sri Lankan government. The couple had a son during this time and returned home in April 1970 when the child was six months old to complete the 5 year compulsory public service in Sri Lanka. Sivaprakasapillai Sivasegaram would have liked to stay at home with the baby for another 6 months but would have been fined 150 Sri Lankan rupees a day if she did not return to work, so worked at the Kandy Peasantry Commission for a monthly salary of 500 rupees.

In 1978 Dr. Sivaprakasapillai Sivasegaram was appointed as the first female Chief Structural Engineer in Sri Lanka and was transferred to the Designs Office in Colombo. She served as one of the prominent engineers in the country when open economic policies were introduced in 1977 by the then President Junius Richard Jayawardene. She oversaw the engineering of the National Library, the Police Headquarters, and the National Archives in Colombo during this time.

Sivasegaram and her family left Sri Lanka following the 1983 Black July riots and she took up a contract in 1985 in Barbados as a consultant to the Commonwealth Fund for Technical Co-operation UK. This ended in 1988 and so she moved to London where her husband was a Research Fellow at Imperial College. She worked for the Property Services Agency and Camden Council during this time.

They returned to Sri Lanka in 1997, once the normalcy was established and after her son had graduated. Sivaprakasapillai Sivasegaram then took up a post at the Engineering Technology Faculty of the Open University of Sri Lanka.

== Recognition ==
In 2015 she was a recipient of the 'Excellence in Engineering Award', awarded by the Institution of Engineers, Sri Lanka.

In March 2019, she was acknowledged as one of twelve female change-makers in Sri Lanka by the parliament, coinciding with International Women's Day. She commented that

“I really enjoyed what I was doing, and I was totally immersed in it. I never said no if I had to do something that normally women don’t have to do; like climbing a high ladder for the first time, I did it without a murmur because you know otherwise they would have said that’s a reason why women should not take up engineering ...Women have a different point of view, the way they use the roads, the public transport and even women’s reaction to drugs, medicines, the way the symptoms show. It is usually quite different, so you need to include women in all activities”.

Sivaprakasapillai Sivasegaram is a long time member and Council Member of the Institution of Engineers of Sri Lanka and edited their quarterly journal Engineer from 1977 to 1980. In 2000, she was elected Honorary Fellow of the Society of Structural Engineers, Sri Lanka. In 2006, she wrote a History of engineering in Sri Lanka: a brief overview.
