= Veronica Milligan =

Welsh electrical and construction management engineer

Veronica “Ronnie” Jean Kathleen Milligan
- Born: 11 March 1926; Pontypridd, South Wales
- Died: 3 September 1989 (aged 63)
- Occupation: Engineer

Veronica “Ronnie” Jean Kathleen Milligan (11 March 1926 – 3 September 1989) was an electrical engineer with expertise in construction management and president of the Women's Engineering Society.

== Early life and education ==
Veronica Jean Kathleen O’Neil was born on 11 March 1926 in Pontypridd, South Wales to Jennie K. and Gilbert O'Neil. She attended the Pontypridd Girls' Grammar School. She studied English and Economics at the University College of South Wales and then undertook teacher training. She married Francis Milligan in 1945. Her mother had made her promise not to neglect her career when she married. When her husband and brother began studying for a Higher National Certificate in electrical engineering, Milligan joined them part-time whilst raising her children.

Milligan later completed a diploma in management studies.

== Career ==
When Milligan started a paid graduate traineeship at South Wales Electricity Board she became their first woman in engineering at the company. Milligan stayed at the Board and moved into a supervisory role as maintenance engineer, then later becoming a district planning engineer.

Milligan became a chartered engineer in 1959 with the Institution of Electrical Engineers. She was considered for the position of district manager at the electricity board, but senior management did not feel that a woman should be in charge of professional men, so she decided to leave.

Milligan set up a consultancy in 1961 called Civlec Industrial Advisory Services where she was a management and engineering consultant.

Milligan was appointed as a manpower advisor with the Department of Employment and Productivity, later becoming a headquarters consultant providing expertise on the construction industry.

In 1972, Milligan was appointed to the Gwent Area Health Authority board by the Secretary of State for Wales. She was then re-appointed in 1976. She was also a member of the National Water Council and sat on an industrial tribunals panel.

In 1978, Milligan became a member of the newly created Commission on Energy and the Environment.

Milligan was recorded in Who's Who and was a senior advisor on industry to Monmouth District Council.

== Memberships ==
Milligan joined the Women's Engineering Society (WES) in 1964 and created the Wales and South-Western branch of the society in 1966. She was awarded a bursary by the Caroline Haslett Memorial Trust to attend the First International Conference of Women Engineers and Scientists in 1964. At the third International Conference of Women Engineers and Scientists in 1971, Milligan presented on construction management practices.

Milligan played a significant role in the society, particularly with regards to delivering careers talks to school girls to encourage them into careers in engineering, she did this through her role as Career's Officer. Milligan later became the President of the Women's Engineering Society (WES) in 1978, succeeding Henrietta Bussell in the role. Milligan's successor as president was Maria Watkins.

Milligan also supported careers counselling through her membership and role within the Institute of Electrical Engineers. She was vice chair of the South Wales branch.

She was also an associate member of the British Institute of Management.

== Personal life ==
Millgan grew up in Pontypridd, South Wales with her father, a school teacher, and brother Maitland O'Neil who was also an electrical engineer. She married Francis Milligan in 1945 and they had two sons. One of the sons, Neil, drowned aged 15 whilst on holiday with his parents in 1964.

Milligan spent her whole life living in South Wales and died in Newport in 1989.
