= Claudia Parsons =

British engineer, writer and traveller

- Born: 15 August 1900; Shimla
- Died: 5 June 1998 (aged 97); Surrey, England
- Education: Loughborough University
- Known for: First woman to circumnavigate the world by car

Claudia Sydney Maia Parsons (15 August 1900 – 5 June 1998) was a British engineer, writer and traveller. One of the first three women to graduate as engineers in England, she also wrote several books and was the first woman to circumnavigate the world by car.

== Early life and education ==
Parsons was born in the Shimla hill station, British India in 1900 into an Anglo-Indian family. Her father was in the Indian Army and her mother came from a family with generations of employment in the East India Company. At the age of two Claudia and her older sister Betty were taken to Britain to be cared for by their grandmother and aunt in Guildford. Their mother returned to India and had a third daughter, Avis.

Parsons attended Tormead School, an independent girls school in Surrey. She attended Guilford Technical Community College, where she completed a course on the auto-cycle engine. She read about the formation of the Women's Engineering Society, and went with her mother to meet the organisation's Secretary, Caroline Haslett, who alerted them about a technical course at Loughborough University. During World War I, Loughborough had served as an instructional factory for the Ministry of Munitions.

In 1919 Parsons enrolled on an automobile engineering course at Loughborough University. She was one of four women, "lady engineers", who were studying engineering out of three hundred students, and graduated in 1922. Her fellow students were Dorothea Travers (one of the first women to be elected to the Institution of Automobile Engineers), Patience Erskine and the mechanical engineer Verena Holmes. After graduation, Parsons was accepted as a probationary graduate of the Institution of Automobile Engineers.

== Career ==
Parsons became a chauffeur-companion and drove clients across Europe, the Far East, India and America. This included driving the American heiress Dolly Rodewald through Bosnian forests filled with howling wolves in a 1930 Ford A model in the middle of a huge snowstorm.

In 1938 Parsons bought a Studebaker car in Delhi, nicknamed it Baker and drove with American anthropologist Kilton Stewart through Afghanistan, Iraq, Palestine and Tunisia.

She is recognised as being the first woman to circumnavigate the world in a car.

Parsons was a member of the Women's Engineering Society and submitted a number of articles to the journal The Woman Engineer, including 'What not to do when motoring abroad'.

During World War II Parsons studied to become a munitions worker with Verena Holmes, and eventually worked as a machinist and a Munitions Factory inspector. After being released from the Freeman's factory after she defended an employee, Parsons worked for the Ministry of Labour until 1949 during which time she wrote an analysis of the engineering trade as a training course for engineering officers.

== Publications ==
Parsons wrote a semi-autobiographical novel, Brighter Bondage in 1935. The Women's Engineering Society review of Brighter Bondage reads “so many of the adventures ring true that one is inclined to speculate as to which bits are purely imaginary. Certainly most of it is less improbable than many of the wild tales we have heard from her".

An autobiography, Vagabondage followed in 1941.

This was followed by China Mending and Restoration (1963) based on her later career in china restoration. Her final autobiography, Century Story, was published in 1995. Her cousin, the diplomat Sir Anthony Parsons wrote the introduction.

Parsons never married, and when she was asked why she responded that men "very often threatened to stop me doing what I wanted to do".

== Commemoration ==
=== Claudia Parsons Lecture ===
Loughborough University has held a lecture in her honour annually since 2014.

2014 - Maggie Aderin-Pocock

2015 - Kate Bellingham

2016 - Helen Czerski

2017 - Emily Grossman

2018 - Jess Wade

2019 - Suzanne Imber

=== Hall of Residence ===
Loughborough University has named a new hall of residence after Claudia Parsons, with the first intake of students in September 2019.
