= Elizabeth M. Kennedy =

British engineer

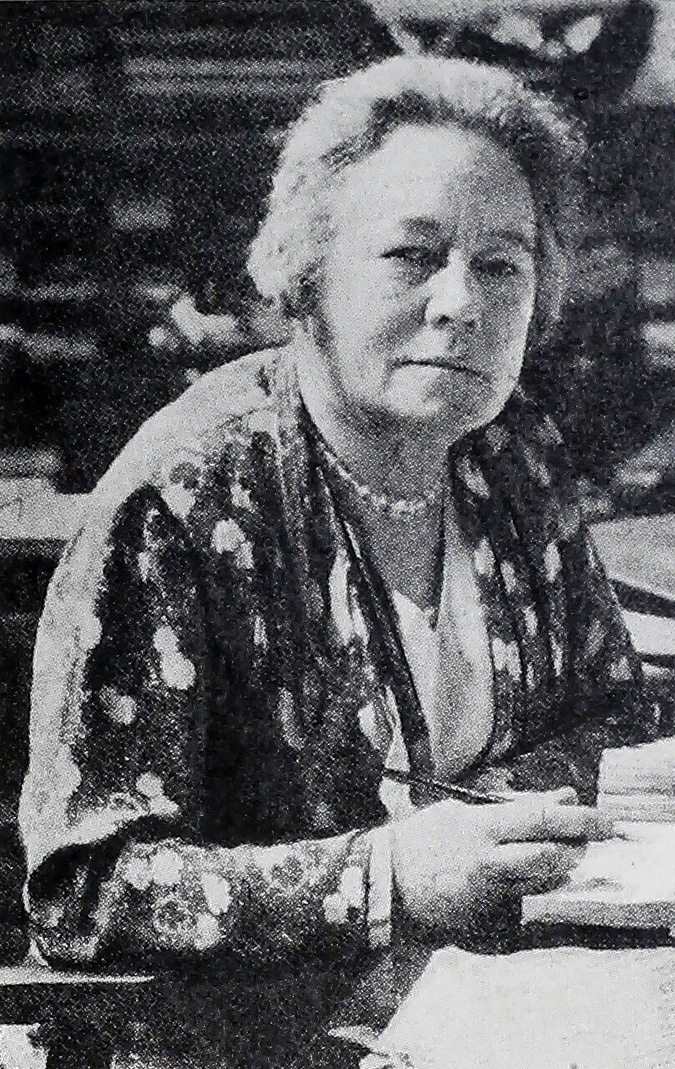
- Kennedy, circa 1939
- Born: September 21, 1873
- Died: August 18, 1957 (aged 83)
- Known for: President of the Women's Engineering Society 1932–34
- Scientific career
- Institutions: Messrs J. B. Stone & Co. Ltd.

Elizabeth M. Kennedy (21 September 1873 - 18 August 1957) was the president of the Women's Engineering Society (WES) from 1932 to 1934. She worked for the London-based machinery manufacturer Messrs J B Stone & Co, initially as a shorthand typist, becoming company Secretary before being appointed to joint managing director in 1915. Shortly afterwards, she was promoted to managing director and remained in this position until her retirement in 1934. Despite her commercial achievements as a female engineer and business woman post-World War I, including opportunities to travel to America, Kennedy remained adamant that she did not label herself as a feminist, stating in her WES retiring president's address:

"I am not a feminist"..."I have never been one, and although I may offend some of my women friends by saying so, I do not think it was the fact that they chained themselves to railings which obtained the vote for women. They showed their worth during the war. It is the ability in either men or women which should give them the opportunity to do what they want"

== Early life ==
Elizabeth Margaret Kennedy was born on 21 September 1873 in Camberwell. As a teenager, Kennedy had aspirations to become a reporter for a London daily newspaper. She obtained a position at a suburban weekly paper but was rejected as the editor was "under the impression that it was a young man whom he had appointed".

== Career ==
Kennedy subsequently found employment as a shorthand typist with Messrs J. B. Stone & Co, a company that initially specialised in wood-working and wood-working machinery, based in east London. The business gradually expanded to include machining tools for metals. In 1911, American born James Barnes Stone, manager of the company, was living as a boarder in Kennedy's home, 35 Allerton Road in Stoke Newington. Sarah Lydia Birbeck was listed as housekeeper and Kennedy listed her as her contact at a later address in Radlett when travelling on business.

Kennedy was appointed Secretary in 1915 when J. B. Stone & Co. turned into a limited liability company. In 1915 she was appointed Joint Managing Director and shortly after, managing director and was known to encourage women to work their way up from the bottom in organisations. She is credited as being "instrumental in putting the nibbling machines, Alligator belt fasteners and other specialities on the market". The Nibbling machine was used for rapid cutting of sheet metal. The company had a branch in Chicago during 1920s and 1930s. Kennedy remained managing director until her voluntary retirement in June 1934.

=== Women's Engineering Society ===
Kennedy became a member of the Women's Engineering Society in 1925. She was appointed President of the society in 1932 and re-elected in 1933.

In 1927 she gave a lecture titled A Business Woman's Trip to America as well as a debate on The Relative Importance of Commercial and Technical Engineering under Present-Day Conditions. As part of the latter event, Kennedy argued from the commercial point of view against Verena Holmes who debated for the technical side. During this debate, Kennedy stressed the importance of harmony between the commercial and technical roles in engineering because "[Invention] cannot progress without finance" yet still required "vision and enterprise to produce what is needed".

Kennedy presented her views on the post-war trade depression in her retiring president's address, written in 1934. She speculated that a potential cause was due to "colossal over-production during the end of and shortly after the war, when firms had been speeded up to meet great demands". When these products were no longer required, manufacturers were forced to buy back excess stock to prevent them from being "sold off cheaply and flooding the markets".

== Travels to America ==
Kennedy paid many visits to the United States during her employment with Messrs J. B. Stone & Co. Ltd, 135 Finsbury Pavement, spanning a time frame when America had great prosperity as well as during the last years of depression. In 1924 Kennedy sailed to America on business on board the RMS Majestic, in April 1926 on the SS Mauritania and in May 1933 on the RMS Franconia.

In her lecture titled A Business Woman's Trip to America, addressed to the Women's Engineering Society on April 8, 1927, she discusses her opinions on conducting business in America, the woman's position and reasons to visit. Of note is her description that "the outstanding characteristic of America was the spirit of youth which prevailed everywhere". She was impressed by the tremendous enterprise of Americans, stating that a "man would throw up his job when he was middle-aged and start afresh, such a thing being utmost unheard of in this country". Kennedy comments on the spirit of co-operation between factory owners and workers, summarising that "there is always a cheery word and smile for everyone, which is very typical of the American business man". She also discusses the role of women in America, highlighting that there is no differentiation between the treatment of business men and women in restaurants and hotels. She viewed this as "a model for the world to follow in civility." However, when referring to women in industry, she concluded that there was more scope in the UK than in America because "American women were kept more on a pedestal and that their menfolk did not regard them as very serious factors in business life."

== Views on women engineers ==
In her retiring president's address to the Women Engineering Society, Kennedy states that she "does not think that there is a great future for women engineers", but she "will never agree that they are encroaching on men's work". In her opinion, men's work and women's work cannot be distinctive and "if a girl has flair for engineering, let her go in for that work, just as a man with a flair for clothes will go in for dress-designing". Highlighting the pressure of family life and the lack of career longevity in the 1930s, Kennedy writes:

"The chief drawback towards women's position in the engineering world is the fact that engineering is a life's job, and the average girl does not, even in these times, expect to be in business all her life. If you ask a boy entering the engineering profession what his position will be at the age of forty, he will say, "A manager of a power station", or "A chief engineer", but if a girl is asked the same questions, she will often reply: "I hope I shall not be still in business at forty.""

== Final years ==
By 1939 Kennedy had retired and was living in Brighton with Sarah Birbeck at 44 Marine Parade. Elizabeth Margaret Kennedy died on 18 August 1957 in Hove.

In Volume 8 (no. 8) of The Woman Engineer, dated Spring 1958, it was announced that Kennedy had died. The obituary states that she "had spent her whole life in engineering".
