= Ebun Oni =

Nigerian geophysicist (1935–2021)

Professor Ebun Oni in 1967 (fair use only)

Professor Ebun Oni (21 May 1935 - 2 December 2021) known in early life as Ebun Adegbohungbe and later as Ebun Adefunmilyo Oni (spousal title) was a Nigerian geophysicist, university teacher and writer. One of Nigeria's first indigenous female scientists, she became a world-renowned specialist in geophysics through her numerous journal publications, and an eminent scientist and educator at the University of Ibadan in Nigeria.

== Education ==
Adegbohungbe was a pupil at the Methodist Girls High School, Yaba, Lagos before going on to receive her undergraduate degree in physics from the University College of Ghana circa 1961. This career path was not her first choice: she had initially wished to be an engineer; however she reported in 1967 that she would have been Nigeria's "first woman engineer many years ago but that the Government refused absolutely to give a scholarship for a woman to study engineering so I was advised to change to physics".

Adegbohungbe received a Nigerian government scholarship for postgraduate training in geophysics at Imperial College, London. She was awarded her MSc degree in 1963, and in the same year she joined the staff of the Department of Physics at University of Ife, Nigeria. Her research specialism was magnetometry, and her first publication ‘Two-component proton precession magnetometer for use in the equatorial zone’ appeared in the Journal of Geophysical Research in March 1967. Around this time she was engaged in PhD research again at Imperial College London, being awarded her doctorate in 1968, joining then the staff of the University of Ibadan in Nigeria.

== Conference presentations ==
Already present in the UK, Adegbohungbe attended the Second International Conference of Women Engineers and Scientists (ICWES) held in Cambridge in 1967, to present her research as it related to Nigeria's broader imperatives for national development. Her paper "Application of Physics to Some Economic problems in Nigeria" was presented in the second part of the conference ‘Food Enough For Everyone’ which addressed the growing international food supply crisis then arising from rapid global population growth. Spelling out Nigerian government policy that the key to greater food supply was increased overall national wealth, she pointed to Nigeria’s mineral resources as a means to generate the necessary industrialisation. Adegbohungbe thus explained how her expertise in magnetometers could be deployed to locate iron ore for future mining projects. She concluded: "Nigerian scientists, therefore, must make their own contributions in their various fields of learning and research, to the economic progress of the country." A picture of her at the conference banquet, alongside fellow Nigerian physicist Deborah Ajakaiye, was published in The Woman Engineer's report of the conference in July 1967. At the end of the conference she was nominated to sit on the committee chaired by Isabel Hardwich, developed to ensure that a third ICWES conference would take place, alongside Mahin Rahmani, Dorothy Mizoguchi, Bilge Özgüner and Angelina Perez Lopez.

By the time of the Third International Conference of Women Engineers and Scientists in Turin Italy, in summer 1971, she had adopted her marital name of Ebun Oni. At this conference she spoke on the challenges faced in 'developing countries' like Nigeria in building connections between national universities and industries. She was closely involved two years later in running the fourth international conference on Equatorial Aeronomy (a branch of atmospheric physics) at Ibadan University in 1972.

== Publications ==
Her first on geophysical publication as a graduate student in 1967 was under her birth name Adegbohungbe and concerned a two‐component proton precession magnetometer specifically to be used in the equatorial zone, i.e. in the African regions including Nigeria. All her subsequent writings (from 1972) on geophysics were under her married surname, Oni. These ranged from theoretical modelling techniques then more empirical work in 1973-76, producing six articles in collaboration with fellow University of Ibadan physicist, Alfred Olu Agunloye. In 1977 she produced two solo papers, later collaborating in 1992 with John A Sogade a recent Ibadan physics PhD student, later a geophysicist at M.I.T.

== Career ==
By 1974 she was a Senior Lecturer in Physics at the University of Ibadan, and in the year Oni visited the United States to undertake research with the National Geophysical and Solar-Terrestrial Data Center. Her visit was reported there as that of a 'renowned geophysicist' seeking to collaborate with American scientists in related fields, specifically citing short-term researcher exchanges as her recommended means to support future scientific collaborations between the USA and Nigeria.

In the 1990s her interest turned to seismology seeking to coordinate national efforts in earthquake research. However, one report in January 2020 indicated that "The National Committee on Earthquake set up by Professor Ebun Oni (1997) is moribund due to lack of funds to continue the project."

During her time at the University of Ibadan, a Physics Students association was formed in the department on May 1, 1985, and for its launch she gave the lecture "The Three Vital processes of Scientific Discovery." Oni was elevated to the position of Professor (1995) and Head of the Physics Department, retiring in 2000.

In addition to her geomagnetic researches published in scientific journals, Oni has also published books under her married name, including an autobiography.

== Bibliography ==
- Ẹbun Oni, Exploring the mind (University of Ibadan, 1975)
- Ebun Adefunmilyo Oni, Light and the Physical Laws of the Universe, (University of Ibadan, 1995)
- Ebun Adefunmilyo Oni, Memoir of a woman physicist (Ibadan: University Press PLC, 2015)
