= Elizabeth Laverick =

Radar and electrical engineer

- in 1967 during a BBC interview
- Born: 25 November 1925; Amersham, Buckinghamshire, England
- Died: 12 January 2010 (aged 84)
- Education: Durham University
- Awards: OBE (1993)
- Scientific career
- Fields: Engineer
- Workplaces: Elliott Automation; Institution of Electrical Engineers; Women's Engineering Society

Elizabeth Laverick OBE FIEE FInstP (25 November 1925 – 12 January 2010) was a British engineer who became technical director of Elliott Automation Radar Systems. Laverick was the first female deputy secretary of the Institution of Electrical Engineers (now the Institution of Engineering and Technology) and president of the Women's Engineering Society. She was the first woman to receive a PhD in a scientific curriculum at Durham University, and was appointed an OBE in 1993.

== Early life and education ==
Laverick was born in Amersham, England in 1925. Her father was a chemist and her mother assisted her father with clerical work. She attended a local grammar school, Dr Challoner's, and took a higher school certificate in physics, maths, French and English. There was an age barrier to attending university at this time so after completing her A levels, Laverick took a job as a technical assistant in the Civil Service at the Radio Research Station in Ditton Park. In 1943 Laverick undertook a bachelor's degree in radio and physics at Durham University. She stayed on at Durham to undertake a PhD researching dielectric measurements at audio frequencies using a differential transformer, and in 1950 became the first woman to receive a PhD in a scientific discipline from Durham University.

== Career ==
Laverick remained at Durham as a research assistant for a year, and was then hired by Sir Robert Clayton at GEC Stanmore (Marconi Defence Systems Ltd.) where she worked as a microwave engineer. Her then husband was also employed at GEC Stanmore. At this time there were five or six female mathematicians, physicists and engineers at GEC Stanmore, alongside several hundred male employees.

In 1954 Laverick moved to Elliott Automation (part of Elliott Brothers) as a microwave engineer, gaining commercial experience in microwave instruments. In 1957 she became a senior engineer and in 1959 she was appointed head of the radar and communication research laboratory. She became technical director of Elliott Automation Radar Systems, a role in which she was responsible for the technical quality and financial viability of four divisions concerned with the research, development and production of radar and other products. A considerable number of the products Laverick was involved in, such as airborne radar and an army radar went into production. Over time Laverick moved away from technical work towards a managerial role and in 1968 she became the general manager of Elliott Automation Radar Systems, though she had thought that, as a woman, she was barred from such managerial work.

Laverick appeared on the BBC interviewed as part of coverage of the week long second International Conference of Women Engineers and Scientists conference in Cambridge in 1967. From 1967 to 1969 Laverick was president of the Women's Engineering Society, taking over from Rose Winslade. She spent spare time giving career talks to girls and doing much to inspire women to work in the field. She became a member of the WES in 1959, presented the first Verena Holmes lecture by WES in 1969 and edited the WES journal (The Woman Engineer) between 1983 and 1990.

In 1984 Laverick accepted nomination as a Vice President of the Electrical Association for Women.

Seeking a career change Laverick applied for and became the first female deputy secretary of the Institution of Electrical Engineers in 1971, a role she held for 14 years.

Laverick was the fifth woman to be made a Fellow of IEE and was a Fellow of the Institute of Physics. She chaired the Institute of Physics' 'Women in Physics Committee' and was the first woman to serve on the IEE Council. In 1993 she received an OBE for 'services to women in engineering and science'.

== Publications ==
- 'The use of special waveforms in the study of linear dielectric phenomena' (1951).
- 'Some measurements and applications of the microwave properties of a magnesium-manganese ferrite in the 8–9 mm waveband' (1957).
- 'The Calibration of Microwave Attenuators by an Absolute Method' (1957).
- 'An automatic standing-wave indicator for the 3-cm waveband' (1959).
- 'Research and development in radar communications' (1960)
- 'EDITORIAL' (1980)
- 'From MAP to AMIE: the IEE's contribution to advanced manufacturing techniques' (1987).
