= Lou Alta Melton =

American civil engineer and bridge engineer

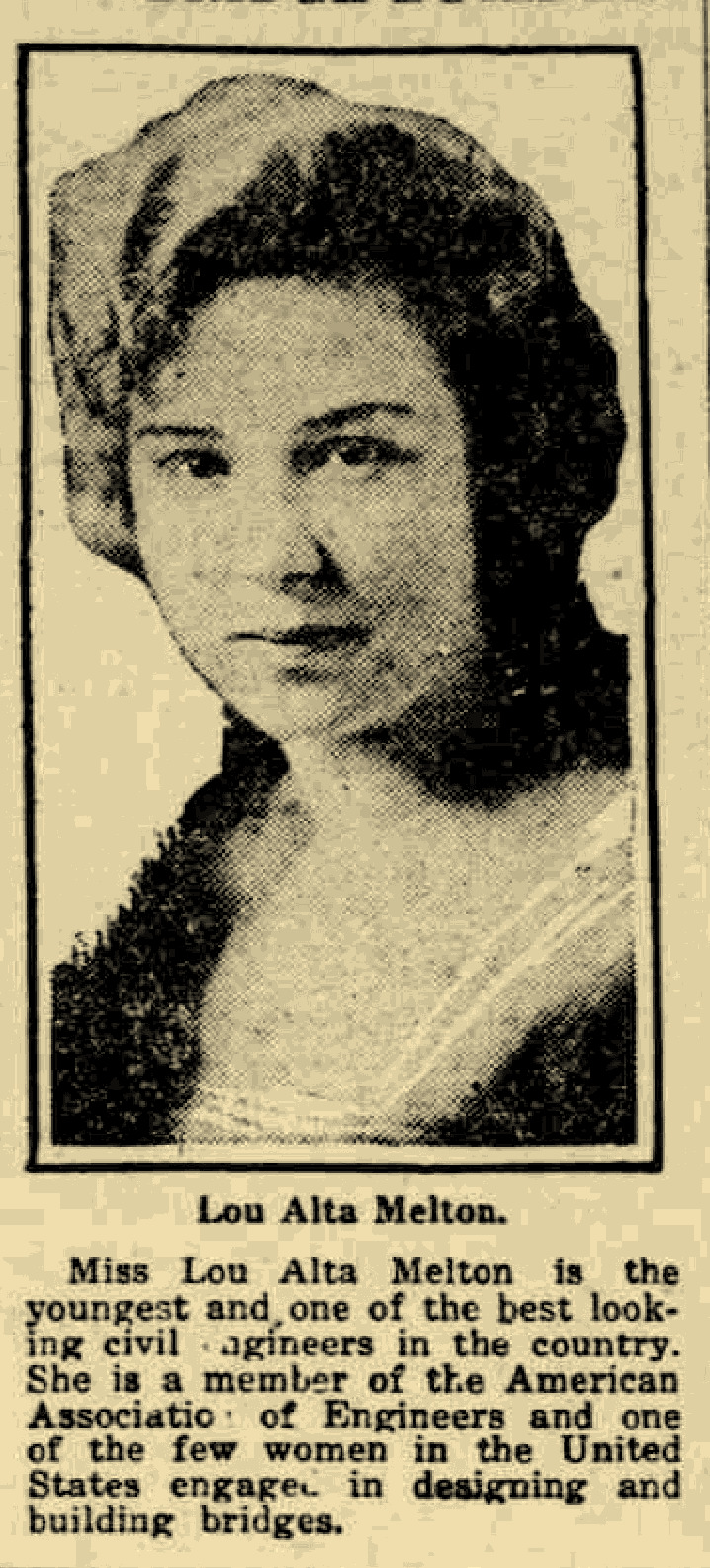
- Born: 8 February 1895; Texas
- Died: 26 July 1974 (aged 79); Phoenix, Arizona

Lou Alta Melton (8 February 1895 – 26 July 1974) was an American civil engineer and bridge engineer.

== Biography ==
Melton was born in Texas, on 8 February 1895 to Sherd Melton and Hesta Long. She grew up in Bayfield, Wisconsin. Melton taught in a primary school in Colorado for a time before she went to the University of Colorado to study civil engineering. She graduated in 1920 and got a job in the United States Bureau of Public Roads. She initially worked in the drafting department, before being promoted to Junior Bridge Engineer. Melton worked in San Francisco at the district office, then as assistant bridge engineer in the Missoula office.

Melton was a member of the American Association of Engineers and she was the first woman to become a member of the Colorado Society of Engineers. She was an active member of the associations. In 1921, she gave a talk at the Missoula branch of the AAE. The Shanghai Times hailed her as "Woman Bridge Builder, in spite of her youth, is as good a civil engineer as any man in the United States". In 1922, The Woman Engineer reprinted this article in the journal.

When Melton worked with Hilda Counts, to create an American Society of Women Engineers and Architects they wrote to all US universities with Engineering departments to find how many women were students. The replies were notable for the number which stated 'this university does not have and never expects to have any women engineering students'. Despite the great number of negative replies it turned out that there were about 200 women students in engineering courses. So the two women announced the establishment of the association and succeeded in a number of women joining in 1919 to 1920. Long term the association did not last but it did foreshadow the US Society of Women Engineers.

== Personal life ==
Melton married Dr. Archibald Shepard Merrill on 26 August 1922 in Alameda, California. They had one daughter, Janet, in 1929 and lived in Missoula, Montana. Merrill later became Professor of Mathematics and Melton was involved with the university Mathematics Society. She taught mathematics at Montana State University and joined the Montana State Board of Examiners in 1953.

She died in on 26 July 1974 in Phoenix, Arizona. She is remembered in the Rocky Mountain Pioneer Scholarship.
