= Olwen Wooster =

Australian air force officer and telecommunications engineer

- Born: 22 December 1917; Charters Towers
- Died: 11 October 1981 (aged 63); Melbourne
- Occupation: Royal Australian Air Force officer telecommunications engineer

Olwen Abigail Wooster BEM (22 December 1917 – 11 October 1981) was an Australian air force officer and pioneering telecommunications engineer expert.

== Early life ==
Wooster, was born on 22 December 1917, in Charters Towers in Queensland to Vivian Henry Wooster, a telephone mechanic, and his wife Ethel Abigail Wooster (née Albrecht). Wooster attended Blackheath College in Charters Towers, Australia.

== Career ==
Working as a switchboard operator in the Postmaster-General's Department beginning in 1934, she was stationed in Ayr in 1936, and then in Townsville in 1941.

In World War II, she was a wireless telegraphy operator in the Women's Auxiliary Australian Air Force in 1942. She served at the Royal Australian Air Force's Melbourne Wireless Transmitting Station as a cypher officer and signals traffic officer. In January 1945, she received an award for 'good service' and was promoted to temporary flight officer.

After the war, Wooster worked at Trans Australia Airlines in Melbourne, specialising in ground communications. Her work grew to cover the Territory of Papua and New Guinea in addition to Australia. By 1954, her team had grown to a total of 120 people. For this work, she received a British Empire Medal in 1961. In 1964, Wooster then joined the Victorian Totalisator Agency Board, which operated gambling and betting shops. Here she worked on communications and computing systems which connected around three hundred town and country agencies and district centres with racecourses. Then in 1967 she began work for Honeywell. In 1978, she launched her own consultancy, O. A. Wooster & Associates Pty Ltd, specialising in computing and communications.

== Memberships ==
Wooster was an associate of the Institute of Electrical and Electronics Engineers (Australian Section), the Australian Institute of Management, and a member of the Society of Women Engineers (U.S.), the Victorian Computer Society and the Telecommunications Society of Australia. She spoke on Communication at the first International Conference of Women Engineers and Scientists in New York in 1964 and was the Australian representative for the organisation of the Second International Conference of Women Engineers and Scientists held in Cambridge, England in 1967. She was president of the Melbourne Soroptimists from 1972 to 1973 and a member of the Lyceum Club.

Wooster died of a heart attack on 11 October 1981 in Melbourne.

Her archives are held at University of Melbourne.
