= Ruth Shafer =

Engineer, organiser and fundraiser

Ruth I Shafer
- Born: March 12, 1912; Brooklyn
- Died: May 19, 1972 (aged 60); New York
- Occupation: Design engineer

Ruth Shafer (12 March 1912 –19 May 1972), was a design engineer and the chair of the first International Conference of Women Engineers and Scientists.

== Early life and education ==
Ruth I Shafer was born in Brooklyn on 12 March 1912. In 1934 she got her undergraduate degree in arts studying French and Literature from the University of Wisconsin. She had wanted to study medicine but family finances would not allow it.

== Career ==
She got into engineering in the 1950s when she was Eastern Division Manager for Overhead Heaters, Inc. She designed and built a pump for oil fired furnaces and flues. Shafer went to work for Gibbs & Cox, Naval Architects and Engineers as a design engineer from 1957 to 1970. She wrote specifications and designs for heating, ventilating and air conditioning systems. Shafer then went on to work for Cauter and Co.

== Society of Women Engineers ==
Shafer held a number of roles with the Society of Women Engineers (SWE). She compiled a handbook of advice on interviews with the New York Section’s employment committee which included "Have your answers for ... "outrageous questions" handy. Retain your composure, and answer calmly; avoiding both offence and defense; but be definite". The handbook gave some examples of such outrageous questions, that "being a woman and an engineer [you] will get ..." including “Don’t you find that men resent you in your work?”; “How can you reconcile engineering with ‘Women’s Work’?”; “Do you think you, as a woman, could direct men in a supervisory capacity?” and "I always though engineering was a man's field, can you keep up with them?".

She was part of the SWE network in the 1950s and 1960s, working alongside colleagues such as Beatrice Hicks to challenge predjudicial statements by companies which did not want to hire women engineers and that made excuses about danger when there was instead "an unwillingness to build women’s restrooms than dangerous working conditions". She also ensured that knowledge about companies which did hire women engineers was widely shared.

She raised the money to establish the headquarters Fund of the Society of Women Engineers which allowed their headquarters in New York to open. She was the New York Section Chairman, national Nominating Chairman, Development Chairman, NY Section Representative on the national Board and Executive Council, Treasurer and Chairman of the Employment Committee.

She was known for running the auctions at the end of each SWE national conference when she would auction off objects left in the "Lost and Found" as well as joke objects which were donated by members and bid on for ridiculous amounts of money by attendees. She was known as the Auctioneer and signed herself as RI$. The funds raised at the first conference were donated to ensure the holding of the second. In 1961 she wore a space traveller costume as part of a SWE fancy dress fundraiser at the National Convention (Conference) in Boston, Massachusetts.

In 1964, she was instrumental in the organising of the First International Conference of Women Engineers and Scientists as well as the conference's Operations Chairman. She brought the fundraising auction tradition to the International conferences.

Shafer was also a member of the British-based Women's Engineering Society, making regular donations to the charity in the 1960s and hosting members in New York when they visited.

On 18 August 1971, she was the first recipient of the SWE's Certificate of Recognition. Shafer was a member of the American Society of Mechanical Engineers and the Women's Engineering Society, the American Society of Heating, Refrigerating and Air Conditioning Engineers.

== Personal life ==
Shafer enjoyed whitewater canoeing and was a member of the Appalachian Mountain Club for five years. She featured in the Who's Who of American Women.

Ruth I Shafer died in New York of cancer after six years of illness on 19 May 1972. Her obituary was written by fellow engineer Elsie Eaves.
