= Marjorie Bell =

British electrical engineer and factory inspector

Marjorie Bell BSc, GradIEE, CEng, MIISO, MIOSH, HonMWES
- Born: 26 December 1906; Edmonton, Middlesex, England
- Died: 10 June 2001 (aged 94); Enfield, London, England
- Education: Northampton Institute
- Occupations: Electrical engineer and factory inspector
- Awards: Queen Elizabeth II Coronation Medal

Marjorie Bell BSc, GradIEE, CEng, MIISO, MIOSH, HonMWES (26 December 1906 – 10 June 2001) was a British electrical engineer and factory inspector. Bell had a number of jobs and ran her own clothing factory before becoming the first woman to study electronic engineering at the Northampton Institute. After graduation, she became a lecturer and demonstrator of electrical appliances. She became a factory inspector in 1936 and worked across the country, receiving a medal for her work during the Second World War. Afterwards Bell worked as an inspector in Mandatory Palestine at the time of the 1947–1948 civil war. Upon her return to the United Kingdom she was promoted to district inspector and received the Queen Elizabeth II Coronation Medal.

In retirement Bell sat on numerous industrial safety committees. She participated in the first European Committee for Electrotechnical Standardization working group on electrical toy safety and became the first woman ever to chair a British Standards Institution technical standards committee. Bell was a chartered engineer, a graduate member of the Institution of Electrical Engineers, a member of the Institution of Industrial Safety Officers and a member of the Institution of Occupational Safety and Health. She was an active member of the Women's Engineering Society, sitting on many of its committees and serving as president in 1956–57.

== Early life ==
Marjorie Bell was born on 26 December 1906 in Edmonton, Middlesex. She came from a modest family, her father and two of her brothers were engineering fitters. Bell attended a convent high school before finding work helping to make equipment at the Cambridge Scientific Instrument Company which she had previously visited on a school trip. Shortly afterwards Bell founded her own clothing factory. After moving to Bungay, Suffolk, she held a succession of jobs including shovelling coal at a gas works for the Bungay Gas and Electricity Company.

Bell then became the first female student to attend the Northampton Institute's electronic engineering course. In the course of her studies she spent a term and a holiday break working at the research laboratories of the General Electric Corporation. In 1932 she joined the Women's Engineering Society and sat on many of their local branch committees. Bell graduated from the Institute with a bachelor of science degree in 1934 and afterwards lectured at the Woolwich Technical College. Also during this time she worked as a demonstrator at the showrooms of the Worthing Town Council electrical department, and afterwards for the Municipal Borough of Ealing.

== Factory inspector ==
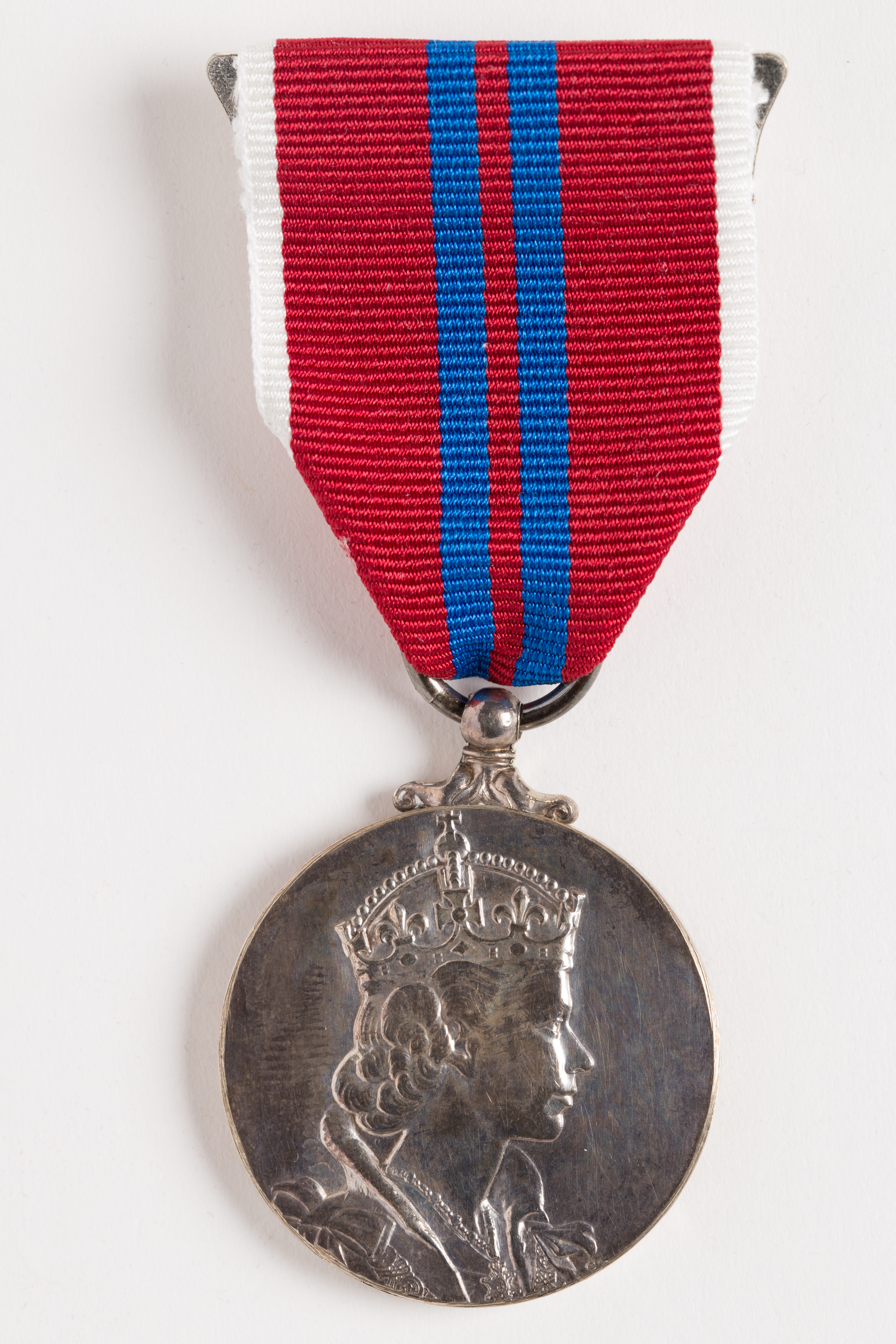
Queen Elizabeth II Coronation Medal

Bell joined Her Majesty's Factory Department as a factory inspector in 1936. She worked in Bristol, Walsall and the East Midlands inspecting factories that cured fish, made bricks, canned fruit and manufactured fertilizers. For her work during the Second World War Bell was awarded a medal. In 1947 she was appointed inspector of labour in the British administered territory of Mandatory Palestine and later became chief inspector of factories in that state. Bell supervised canning factories in Jaffa, potash, olive oil and soap works around the Dead Sea and oil refineries at Haifa and led a mixed Jewish and Arab team. Despite the ongoing civil war in Mandatory Palestine which saw some of the factories caught in the crossfire Bell later stated that her time in Palestine was amongst her fondest memories.

After a year she returned to the United Kingdom as a factory inspector in Wolverhampton where she was responsible for the factories that made a large proportion of the British glass production. Bell was promoted to district inspector for Gloucester, then Blackburn and London. She was awarded the Queen Elizabeth II Coronation Medal in 1953 and served as president of the Women's Engineering Society for their 1956–57 session. She succeeded Kathleen Cook in the role and was succeeded in turn by Madeleine Nobbs.

As a woman Bell was forced to retire at the age of 60 under a civil service policy of the time.

== Later career ==
After retirement Bell worked for a number of consultancies and sat on numerous industrial safety committees. She sat on the first ever European Committee for Electrotechnical Standardization working group on electrical toy safety and became the first woman ever to chair a British Standards Institution technical standards committee (which was also on toys).

Bell was a graduate member of the Institution of Electrical Engineers and a member of the Institution of Industrial Safety Officers and Institution of Occupational Safety and Health. She became a chartered engineer and was appointed an honorary member of the Women's Engineering Society in 1972.

In her spare time Bell was a member of Soroptimist International, a bee keeper and looked after two allotments.

She died in Enfield, London on 10 June 2001. Bell left her body to science and had a non-religious funeral.
