= Beatrice Hicks =

Early woman engineer from the United States

- Born: Beatrice Alice Hicks; January 2, 1919; Orange, New Jersey, U.S.
- Died: October 21, 1979 (aged 60); Princeton, New Jersey, U.S.
- Education: Newark College of Engineering (1935 BS chemical engineering); Stevens Institute of Technology (1949 MS physics)
- Spouse: Rodney Duane Chipp (m. 1948)
- Engineering career
- Institutions: Founding of the Society of Women Engineers in 1950
- Employer: Newark Controls Company
- Significant design: Gas density switch (patent)
- Significant advance: Pioneer in the field of sensors that detected device structural limits
- Awards: National Academy of Engineering, National Inventors Hall of Fame, Achievement Award Society of Women Engineers

Beatrice Alice Hicks (January 2, 1919 – October 21, 1979) was an American engineer and the owner of Newark Controls Company. Hicks developed a gas density switch that has been used in the U.S. space program, including the Apollo Moon landing missions, in aircraft including the Boeing 707, in communications, to monitor nuclear weapons, and in equipment for the electric utility industry. Hicks was elected to the National Academy of Engineering.

Hicks was the co-founder and first president of the Society of Women Engineers.

== Early life and education ==
Beatrice Alice Hicks was born in 1919 in Orange, New Jersey, to Florence Benedict and William Lux Hicks, a chemical engineer. Hicks decided at an early age that she wanted to be an engineer. While her parents neither supported nor opposed Hicks' desired career path, some of her teachers and classmates tried to discourage her from becoming an engineer, viewing it as a socially unacceptable role for a woman.

She graduated from Orange High School in 1935 and received a bachelor's degree in chemical engineering from Newark College of Engineering (now New Jersey Institute of Technology) in 1939, one of only two women in her class. During college, Hicks worked in the treasury office of an Abercrombie & Fitch store as a telephone operator, and in the university's library.

After receiving her undergraduate degree, Hicks was employed by the Newark College of Engineering for three years as a research assistant, where she researched the inventions of Edward Weston and set up a museum containing his models. She took additional classes at night. Her work on Weston was foundational for a biography of Weston written by David O. Woodbury and published in 1949 titled A Measure for Greatness.

== Career ==
In 1942 Hicks took a job at the Western Electric Company, first working in the test set design department where she set up tests for telephone equipment that was used in toll circuits and then designing and testing quartz crystal oscillators in Kearny, New Jersey.

She joined the Bloomfield, New Jersey–based Newark Controls Company, a metalworking firm that her father had founded, as chief engineer in 1945. When her father died in 1946, Hicks became vice president in charge of engineering. She purchased control of the company from her uncle in 1955. Hicks designed and patented a gas density switch later used in the U.S. space program, including the Moon landing, and was a pioneer in the field of sensors that detected when devices were reaching structural limits. Hicks authored several technical papers on the gas density switch. Others of her sensors monitored pressure, fuel levels, and flow rates for both liquids and gases.

While at Newark Controls Hicks pursued a master's degree in physics, which she received in 1949 from the Stevens Institute of Technology. Subsequently, Hicks completed some graduate electrical engineering courses at Columbia University.

In 1966, Hicks sold off Newark Controls Company and took over her late husband's consulting business.

== Awards, honors and professional affiliations ==
Hicks was a member of both the American Society of Mechanical Engineers and the Institute of Electrical and Electronics Engineers, the National Society of Professional Engineers, the New Jersey State Society of Professional Engineers, Eta Kappa Nu, and the Women's Engineering Society of Great Britain. In 1960 Hicks and her husband were selected by the National Society of Professional Engineers for a month-long research and speaking tour of South America, which focused on international cooperation between American and South American engineers.

Hicks was a co-founder and the first president of the Society of Women Engineers and was succeeded by Lillian Murad. She was selected to serve on the Defense Advisory Committee for Women in Services between 1960 and 1963, and represented the United States at four International Management Congresses.

Hicks was licensed as a professional engineer in New Jersey, New York, Pennsylvania, and the District of Columbia.

In 1952 Mademoiselle magazine named Hicks "Woman of the Year in Business".

In 1963 Hicks received the Achievement Awards from the Society of Women Engineers in "recognition of her significant contributions to the theoretical study and analysis of sensing devices under extreme environmental conditions, and her substantial achievements in international technical understanding, professional guidance and engineering education"

In 1978 Hicks was elected to the National Academy of Engineering, the highest professional honor in engineering, and became the sixth woman elected.

She received posthumous awards as well. In 2002 Hicks was inducted into the National Women's Hall of Fame. In 2013, she received the Advancement of Invention Award from the New Jersey Inventors Hall of Fame. In 2017, Hicks was inducted into the National Inventors Hall of Fame.

Hicks received honorary doctorates from Hobart and William Smith College, Rensselaer Polytechnic Institute, Stevens Institute of Technology, and Worcester Polytechnic Institute. She was the first female recipient of an honorary doctorate from Rensselaer Polytechnic Institute.

== Legacy ==
In 1950 Hicks and other women based on the East coast of the United States began meeting to form an organization, the goal of which was to advance female engineers and increase female participation in engineering. The organization was incorporated as the Society of Women Engineers (SWE) two years later. Hicks served as the president of SWE for two consecutive terms, from 1950 to 1952. In 1963 the Society of Women Engineers presented her with their highest honor, the Society of Women Engineers Achievement Award. Hicks toured the United States, championing the cause of female engineers through outreach and speaking engagements. She believed that while female engineers would initially be closely watched, they would also be quickly accepted.

Alongside her SWE colleagues, including Ruth Shafer, Hicks organized the First International Conference of Women Engineers and Scientists in New York in 1964.

Hicks was the first woman engineer to be hired by Western Electric, and both co-founder and first president of the Society of Women Engineers.

“There's hardly a space shot from Cape Canaveral (Kennedy Space Center) that does not carry an environmental sensor designed and made by Beatrice Hicks.” (Fields, 1963) Hicks’ sensor was “an innovation that made possible the development of advanced technologies of the time and was a critical breakthrough to enabling space travel”.

== Personal life ==
In 1948, Hicks married fellow engineer Rodney Duane Chipp (d. 1966) who held two director-level engineering positions before starting a consulting firm. When her husband died in 1966, Hicks sold off Newark Controls Company and took over her late husband's consulting business.

Beatrice Hicks died on October 21, 1979 in Princeton, New Jersey.

== Additional reading ==
- Tietjen, Jill S. (2025). Chapter 16 "Beatrice Hicks". In Craig, Cecilia; Teig, Holly; Kimberling, Debra; Williams, Janet; Tietjen, Jill; Johnson, Vicki (eds.). Women Engineering Legends 1952-1976: Society of Women Engineers Achievement Award Recipients. Springer Cham. ISBN 9783032002235
- Busch-Vishniac, Ilene; Busch, Lauren; Tietjen, Jill (2024). "Chapter 20. Beatrice Hicks". Women in the National Inventors Hall of Fame: The First 50 Years. Springer Nature. ISBN 9783031755255.
