= Letitia Obeng =

Ghanaian zoologist (1925–2023)

Letitia Obeng FGA
- Born: 10 January 1925; Anum, Eastern Region, Gold Coast
- Died: 23 March 2023 (aged 98)
- Education: Achimota College; University of Birmingham (BSc); Liverpool School of Tropical Medicine (PhD)
- Occupation: Scientist
- Relatives: Theodosia Okoh

Letitia Eva Takyibea Obeng FGA (10 January 1925 – 23 March 2023) was the first Ghanaian woman to obtain a degree in zoology and the first to be awarded a doctorate. She is described as "the grandmother of female scientists in Ghana".

== Early life and education ==
Letitia Obeng was born at Anum an aboriginal Guan community in the Eastern Region on 10 January 1925. She attended a primary school in Abetifi, Kwahu and a middle school in Kyebi. Between 1939 and 1946, she had her secondary school education at Achimota College. While at school she took the London University International Examination to continue her education, courtesy of a government scholarship at the University of Birmingham (1948–1952), where she was the only African female student on the Edgbaston campus. She graduated from the university with a degree in Zoology. In her autobiography, she describes her experience of coming to study in the United Kingdom in the post-war years, including the prejudices she faced.

== Career, achievements and awards ==
=== Degrees ===
Letitia Obeng was the first Ghanaian woman to be awarded a Bachelor of Science degree in Zoology and Botany (1952), a Master of Science degree in Parasitology (1962) and a PhD in Tropical Medicine (1964). Her Bachelor and Master of Science degrees were both awarded by the University of Birmingham and her PhD was awarded by the Liverpool School of Tropical Medicine, where she studied the black fly and its relevance to river blindness. She became very familiar with the freshwater courses in North Wales during her PhD studies and often brought her three children, who were 8, 6 and 3 at the time, to take samples in the area's rivers and streams.

=== Positions ===
After her university education in the United Kingdom, she returned to her homeland Ghana and lectured at the University College of Science and Technology now known as the Kwame Nkrumah University of Science and Technology between 1952 and 1959. In 1952, Letitia Obeng became the first female scientist at the Kwame Nkrumah University of Science and Technology (KNUST) where her husband also worked as a lecturer. After her husband's death in 1959, Letitia Obeng moved to the Council for Scientific and Industrial Research (CSIR) (formerly known as National Research Council of Ghana) and in 1964, she established the Institute of Aquatic Biology within the same institution for research on Ghana's huge manmade Volta Lake and its inland water system. Letitia Obeng was the first scientist to be employed by the National Research Council of Ghana. In 1965, Letitia Obeng became a fellow of the Ghana Academy of Arts and Sciences and in 2006, she became the academy's first female president. In 1972, Dr. Obeng delivered the Caroline Haslett Memorial Lecture to the Royal Society for the Encouragement of Arts, Manufactures and Commerce. Her lecture was titled “Nation Building and the African Woman”. Also in 1972, she was an invited participant in the United Nations Human Environment Conference in Stockholm. In 1974, she began work as the Officer in the United Nations Environment Programme (UNEP). In 1980, she became the Director of the UNEP Regional Office for Africa and UNEP's Representative to Africa. Elected the first woman to the Fellowship of the Ghana Academy of Arts and Sciences, in 2008, she was unanimously chosen to be its first female President.

== Author ==
Obeng launched her first book -Anthology of a Lifetime in July 2019. It is a selection from the distinguished scientist's talks, speeches, writings and publications produced during the last 60 years.

== Research and publications ==
Letitia Obeng's research and publication focus on the environment, health and science education particularly in Africa. Her doctoral research investigated the aquatic stages of the Simuliidae identified as a major transmitter of the parasite for river blindness. Related to this research are her articles titled “Life-history and population studies on the Simuliidae of North Wales” and “The identification of the aquatic stages of the British Simuliidae”. In a paper titled "Environmental of Impacts of Four African Impoundments”, Dr. Obeng considers the environmental effects of four African dams: Lake Volta, Lake Kariba, Lake Kainji and Lake Nasser. Some of her other research and publications include:

- The helminth fauna of rodents of the sub-family Murinae in Ghana. (1965)
- Man-made lakes (1969).
- Wildlife in the Volta Basin. Man-made Lakes (1969); co-authored with Asibey, E. O. A.
- Volta Lake: Physical and biological aspects (1973)
- Should dams be built? The Volta Lake example (1977)
- Too Much or Too Little (1975)
- Starvation or Bilharzia? a rural development dilemma (1978)
- Man's impact on tropical rivers (1981)
- Progress of Science in Africa—in Tradition, Culture and Religion (1986)
- The right to health in tropical agriculture (1992)

Obeng was also the author of Obeng, Letitia E. (1997). Parasites, the Sly and Sneaky Enemies inside You. Goldsear. ISBN 978-9988010171., a book written mainly for a non-scientific audience. Besides her science-related publications, Letitia Obeng is also the author of Obeng, Letitia Eva (2008). A Silent Heritage: an Autobiography. Goldsear. ISBN 9789988098834.

== Personal life and death ==
Obeng was the sister of the late Madam Theodosia Okoh, the designer of the Ghana flag. Her father, Very Reverend E.V. Asihene, was the Moderator of the Presbyterian Church of Ghana and her mother's name was Dora Asihene. She was married to George A. Obeng who died in 1959. They had three kids (two boys and a girl). The British Organizational theorists, professor and author Edward David Asihene "Eddie" Obeng (born 1959) is one of Letitia Obeng's children.

Obeng died on 23 March 2023, at the age of 98.

== Awards and honours ==
From 1992 to 1993, Obeng was a Distinguished International Visitor fellow at Radcliff College. In 1997, she received the CSIR Award for Distinguished Career and Service to Science and Technology, the first female to receive such an award. Additionally, the CSIR Laboratory (known as The Letitia Obeng Block) was named after her in 1997. Letitia Obeng received Ghana's highest national award, Order of the Star of Ghana in 2006. In 2017, she received an honorary Doctor of Science degree from KNUST.
