= International Conference of Women Engineers and Scientists =

Conference for women engineers and scientists

ICWES (International Conference of Women Engineers and Scientists) is an international conference for engineers and scientists. Established in 1964, it takes place every 3–4 years in countries around the world.

Since 1999, the conference has been organised by the International Network of Women Engineers and Scientists (INWES), which was founded at the World Conference on Science (Budapest, Hungary) in 1999. The first conference took place in New York City, USA in 1964, the second followed in 1967 in Cambridge, UK. Since then meetings have taken place in Turin, Italy (1971); Cracow, Poland (1975); Rouen, France (1978); Mumbai, India, (1981); Washington DC, USA (1984); Abidjan, Ivory Coast (1988); Warwick, UK (1991); Budapest, Hungary (1996); Chiba, Japan (1999); Ottawa, Canada (2002); Seoul, Korea (2005); Lille, France (2008); Adelaide, Australia (2011); Los Angeles, USA (2014); New Delhi, India (2017). ICWES 18 was postponed due to the Covid pandemic and took place in Coventry, UK, in 2021. ICWES 19 was hosted in Aotearoa, New Zealand in 2023.

== ICWES I - New York City ==
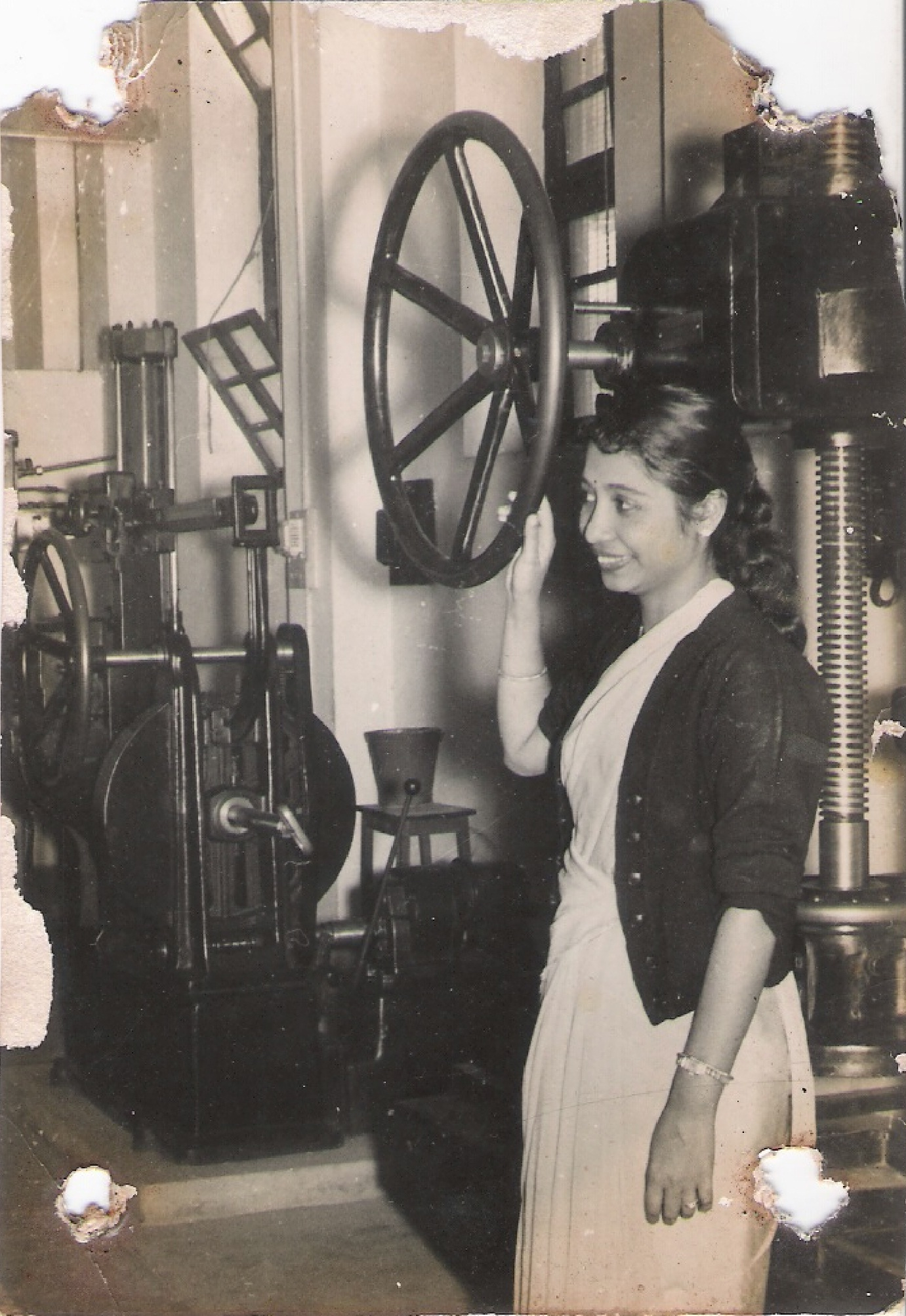
Mechanical engineer Ila Ghosh (née Majumdar), from India, who attended the second ICWES conference in Cambridge, England in 1967

The first ICWES conference took place in New York City, United States of America in 1964 and was organised by the American Society of Women Engineers (SWE). Beatrice Hicks was Conference Director and Ruth Shafer was Operations Chairman. The Technical Program was managed by Margaret R. Fox and the PR by Elsie Eaves. The theme of the conference was on developing engineering and scientific talent for the future.

There were 493 listed attendees from 35 different countries, including Lillian Gilbreth, Beatrice Hicks, Grace Hopper, Ayyalasomayajula Lalitha, and Isabel Hardwich. The conference received funding from the National Science Foundation, the Asia Foundation, the Engineers Joint Council, as well as other companies and individual donations. Included in the conference programme was a trip to the New York's World Fair, which was taking place at the same time. The conference proceedings published a message sent to the conference from Lyndon B. Johnson, which stated that 'in focusing on the untapped potential and ability of talented women to participate in these professional activities, you and your colleagues are performing a distinguished service in our society'.

Talks and statements were given by a variety of women from different countries, including Lillian Gilbreth (USA), Ira Rischowski (UK), Isabel Hardwich (UK), Cicely Thompson (UK) Jacqueline Juillard (Switzerland), Dorothy Mizoguchi (Japan), Ilse Knott-ter Meer (West Germany), Olwen Wooster (Australia), Maria Telkes (US), Anna Amour (Italy) and Francisca Fernández-Hall, a civil engineer and Guatemalan ambassador to Israel.

== ICWES II - Cambridge ==
The second ICWES conference was organised by the United Kingdom's Women's Engineering Society (WES) and took place in Cambridge, England in 1967. The themes of the conference were the application of technology to solve world food problems and the question of women's representation in engineering and science across the world. There were 309 listed attendees from 35 different countries, with attendees including Ghanaian zoologist Leticia Obeng, Ugandan engineer Miriam Muwanga, Japanese geochemist Katsuko Saruhashi, American aeronautical engineer Katherine Stinson, Betty Lou Bailey who worked for General Electric Company and engineer and journalist Elsie Eaves and Indian mechanical engineer Ila Ghose and K. K. Khubchandani. Nigerian physicists Deborah Ajakaiye and Ebun Adegbohungbe also attended as did Sri Lanka's first woman engineer Premala Sivaprakasapillai Sivasegaram. In The Woman Engineer – journal of WES – Leticia Obeng commented on the atmosphere of the conference: 'The change from the serious talks in the Chemistry Laboratory Hall to the gay atmosphere at the pre-banquet reception was a vivid demonstration of the adaptability of the human female to varying conditions.' British attendees included engineers Isabel Hardwich, Ira Rischowski (who was accommodation secretary), Rose Winslade, Cicely Thompson, and Hettie Bussell. No delegates attended from Russia due to the Six-Day War.

== ICWES III - Turin ==
The third International Conference of Women Engineers and Scientists was held in Turin, Italy ( 30 August - 5 September 1971), organised by Dr Anna Amour and AIDIA (the Italian Association for Women in Engineering and Architecture), and supported by the late Dr. Emma Strada. Attendees included Erna Hamburger, Letitia Obeng, Nicole Becarud, Deborah Ajakaiye, Ebun Oni (née Adegbohungbe), Olive Salembier, Azarmidokht Arjangi, May Maple, Hettie Bussell, Irene Ryan, Peggy Hodges, Elizabeth Laverick, Daphne Jackson, Grace Hopper, Veronica Milligan.

== ICWES IV - Cracow ==
Cracow, Poland (1975)

== ICWES V - Rouen ==
The fifth International Conference of Women Engineers and Scientists was held 4–8 September 1978 in Rouen, France, under the auspices of the Cercle Des Femmes Ingenieurs, led by their President, Nicole Becarud. It was attended by over 200 delegates from 35 countries.

== ICWES VI - Mumbai ==
Mumbai, India (1981)

== ICWES VII - Washington DC ==
Washington DC, USA (1984)

== ICWES VIII - Abidjan ==
Abidjan, Ivory Coast (1988)

== ICWES IX - Warwick ==
Warwick, UK (1991)

== ICWES X - Budapest ==
Budapest, Hungary (1996)

== ICWES XI - Chiba ==
Chiba, Japan (1999);

== ICWES XII - Ottawa ==
Ottawa, Canada (2002)

== ICWES XIII - Seoul ==
Seoul, South Korea (2005)

== ICWES XIV - Lille ==
Lille, France (2008)

== ICWES XV - Adelaide ==
Adelaide, Australia (2011)

== ICWES XVI - Los Angeles ==
Los Angeles, USA (2014)

== ICWES XVII - New Delhi ==
ICWES17 was held on 5–7 October 2017 in New Delhi, India, hosted by WISE-India, with nearly 300 attendees from 18 countries and four continents.

== ICWES XVIII - Coventry, UK ==
ICWES18 was held in Coventry in 2021.

== ICWES XIX - New Zealand ==
ICWES19 was held in 2023.
