= Verena Holmes =

English mechanical engineer and inventor (1889–1964)

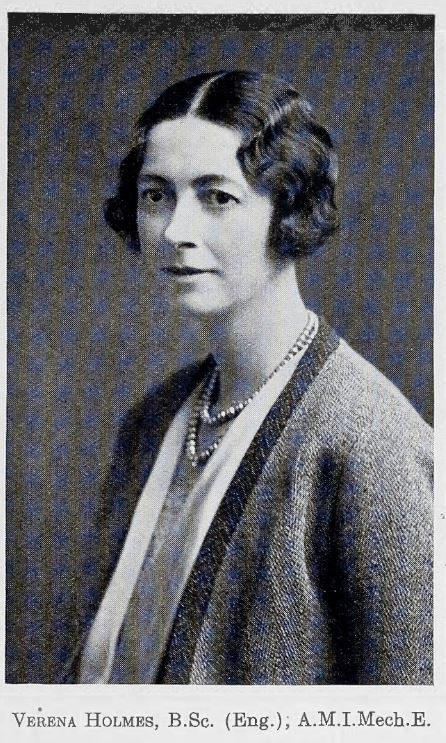
- Holmes in 1930
- Born: 23 June 1889; Ashford, Kent, England
- Died: 20 February 1964 (aged 74)
- Occupation: Mechanical engineer

Verena Winifred Holmes (23 June 1889 – 20 February 1964) was an English mechanical engineer and multi-field inventor, the first woman member elected to the Institution of Mechanical Engineers (1924) and the Institution of Locomotive Engineers (1931), and was a strong supporter of women in engineering. She was one of the early members of the Women's Engineering Society, and its president in 1931. She was the first practising engineer to serve as president of the society.

== Early life ==
She was born at Highworth, Ashford, Kent to Florence Mary Holmes (née Syme) (d. 1927), and Edmond Gore Alexander Holmes, chief inspector of elementary schools for England. She was one of three children, her brother Maurice Gerald Holmes (1885–1964) became a leading British civil servant. Her sister Flora or Florence Ruth Holmes, known as Ruth, (1881-1969) was a writer.

Holmes was educated at Oxford High School for Girls, and after leaving school worked briefly as a photographer before the outbreak of the First World War enabled her to start working at the Integral Propeller Company, Hendon, on the manufacture of wooden propellers. While working, Holmes attended night classes at Shoreditch Technical Institute. She then moved to Lincoln to work for the industrial engine manufacturer Ruston and Hornsby, where she started as a supervisor for 1,500 women employees. Due to the relaxation of working conditions in wartime, she was able to complete an apprenticeship at the company and by 1919 was working in the drawing office. Unlike most of her contemporaries, she continued to be employed by the company after the end of the war. As when she was working in Hendon, Holmes attended technical classes at a local technical college.

In 1922, Holmes graduated from Loughborough Engineering College with a BSc(Eng) degree. Her fellow students at Loughborough included the engineer and international traveller Claudia Parsons. After graduating, Holmes spent a short time as a technical journalist in the United States, later becoming a freelance designer.

== Professional career ==
Her technical specialities included marine and locomotive engines, diesel and internal combustion engines. She became an associate member of the Institution of Marine Engineers in 1924 and was the first woman to be admitted to the Institution of Locomotive Engineers in 1931.

In 1925, Holmes set up her own consulting company. Holmes patented a number of inventions, including the Holmes and Wingfield pneumo-thorax apparatus for treating patients with tuberculosis, a surgeon's headlamp, a poppet valve for steam locomotives, and rotary valves for internal combustion engines. She held patents for twelve inventions for medical devices as well as engine components. From 1928 to 1931 she worked at the North British Locomotive Works, Glasgow, and from 1931 to 1939 at Research Engineers Ltd.

During World War II Holmes worked on naval weaponry and in 1940 became adviser to Ernest Bevin, the minister of labour, on the training of munition workers. She was appointed headquarters technical officer with the Ministry of Labour (1940-1944).

== Support for women's engineering ==
Together with Caroline Haslett and Claudia Parsons, Holmes was active in the Women's Engineering Society (WES), founded in 1919. She served that society in several capacities, including president in 1930 and 1931 and was involved in the complex discussions about the organisation's direction of travel which led to the resignation of the second president Katharine Parsons in 1925. She was a delegate at the first International Conference of Women in Science, Industry and Commerce in July 1925. In 1927 she took part in a debate on The Relative Importance of Commercial and Technical Engineering under Present-Day Conditions, debating the technical side, against fellow WES member Elizabeth M. Kennedy who supported the commercial point of view.

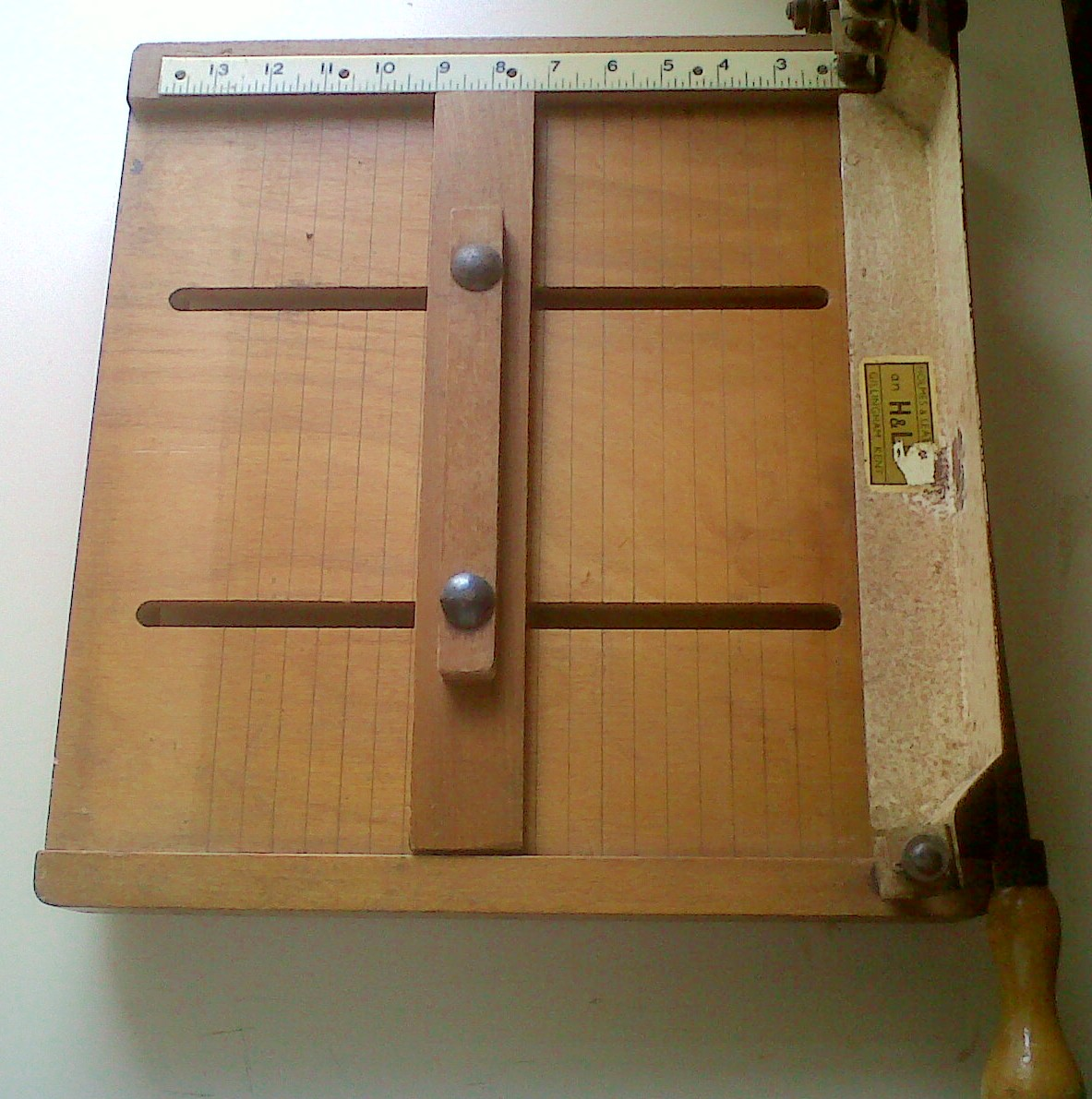
Holmes & Leather safety guillotine

Her work in support of women in engineering was based partly upon her own experiences; although she had been admitted to the Institution of Mechanical Engineers as an associate member on 22 February 1924, it took twenty years for her to be admitted as a full member. A previous attempt to join in 1920 had been turned down, alongside seven male applicants, although the IME were at pains to explain that in Holmes' case it was "without prejudice on account of the Candidate's sex". In 1946 Holmes founded the engineering firm of Holmes and Leather in Gillingham, Kent, with Sheila Leather a fellow WES member and future President (1950–1951). They employed only women. Using a design created by Holmes, this firm created the first practical safety guillotine for paper, making it suitable for introduction into schools. In 1951 whilst also Managing Director of Holmes and Leather, Holmes took an additional part-time appointment as Technical Director of Calnorth Ltd., Engineers, of Marlborough St, London.

In 1955 the Women's Engineering Society published a booklet compiled by Holmes, Training and Opportunities for Women in Engineering, which was revised by Holmes and Lesley S. Souter in 1958. She was influential in setting up the Women's Technical Services Register during the Second World War, which included a training course for women munitions workers to enable them to apply for roles such as junior draughtsmen and laboratory assistants.

== Commemoration ==
From 1969, the Women's Engineering Society supported a yearly Verena Holmes lecture, given at various venues across Britain to children aged nine to eleven to encourage interest in engineering. In 1972, Cicely Thompson toured Britain delivering the lectures. The lecture series ran for many years until the lecture fund was wound up in 2009. The Institute of Mechanical Engineers now has a Verena Winifred Holmes award first awarded in 2015.

Verena Holmes' birthday of 23 June coincides with International Women in Engineering Day and she is commemorated as part of that celebration.

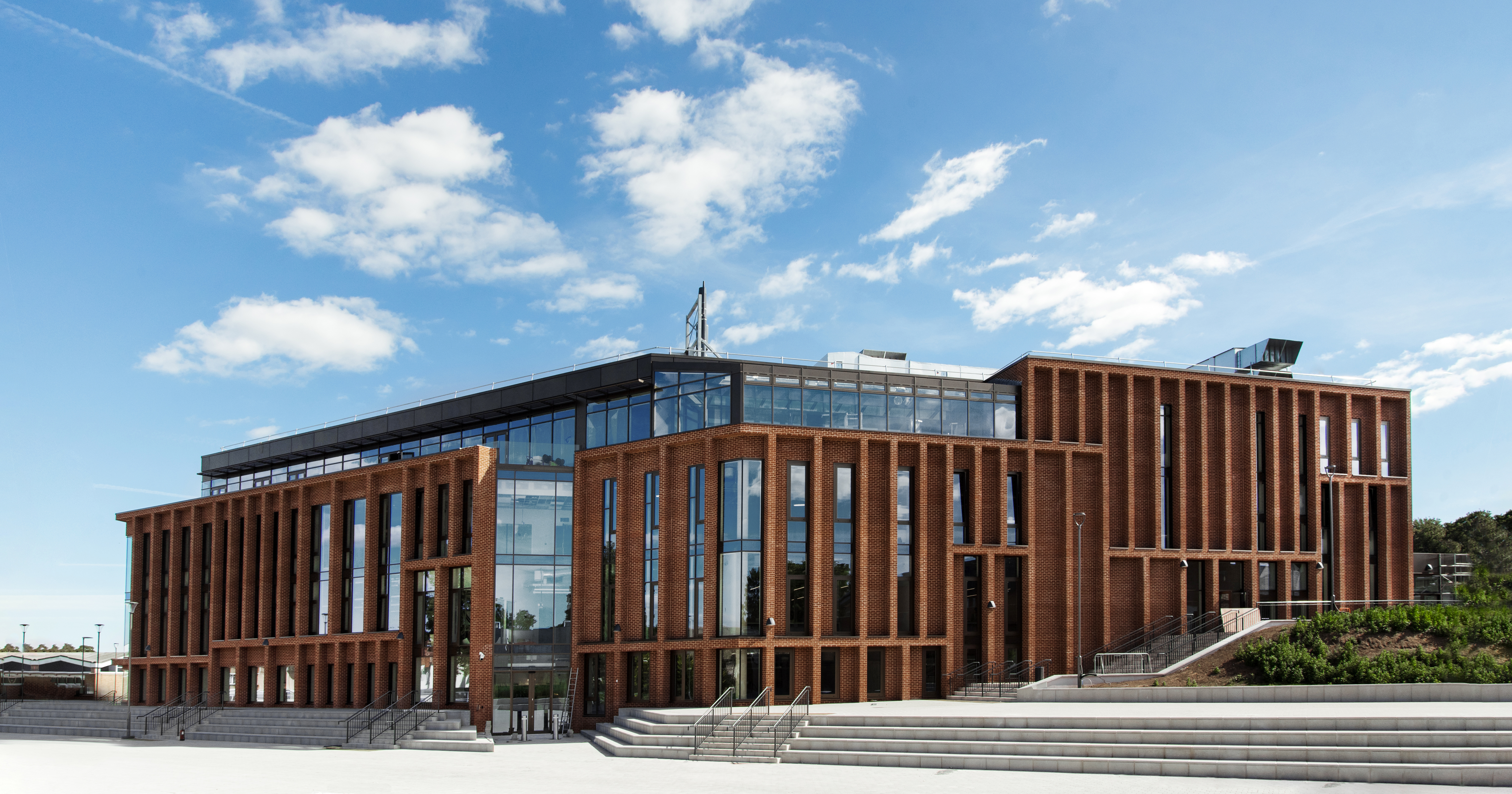
The Verena Holmes Building at Canterbury Christ Church University

On 8 March 2021, Canterbury Christ Church University, in Canterbury, UK, officially opened the Verena Holmes Building, a £65 million STEM building named in her honour, to coincide with International Women's Day.

On 23 June 2022, the British Science Museum of London paid tribute to Verena Holmes for its 133rd birthday. The following year, on the same date, Southeastern railways named a Class 375 train (Unit 375829) in Holmes' honour in a ceremony held at Cannon Street station and attended by her great niece.

A mural of Holmes was included in a series of murals displayed in Gillingham between 2022-2023 as part of Medway Libraries' Circle of Six project.

On 24 June 2024, the first school day after Verena Holmes birthday, Highworth Grammar School unveiled a plaque on the building where Verena Holmes was born, which is part of its campus, and named a new building, to be used for teaching mathematics, 'The Verena Holmes Building'.
