= Panther Model 100 =

British motorcycle manufactured by Phelon & Moore

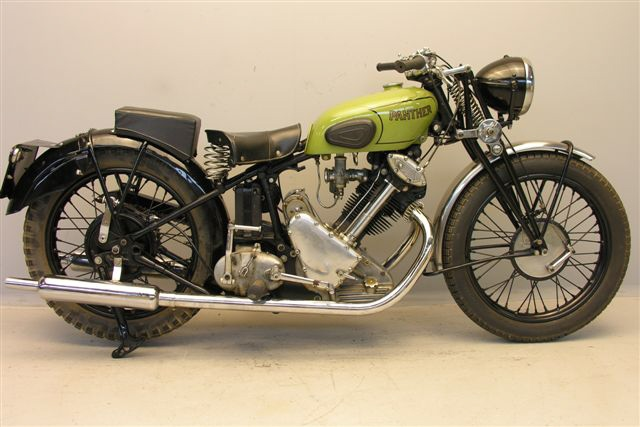
- Manufacturer: Phelon & Moore
- Production: 1932 to 1963
- Predecessor: Model 60
- Successor: Model 120
- Engine: 598 cc (36.5 cu in) air cooled, single cylinder, overhead valve, pushrod four stroke
- Bore / stroke: 87 mm × 100 mm (3.4 in × 3.9 in)
- Top speed: 70mph (113 km/h)
- Power: 23 bhp (17 kW) at 5,300 rpm
- Transmission: Four speed. Multi-plate clutch in oil
- Brakes: 8in. front drum, 7in. rear drum
- Tires: Front tyre 3.25 × 19in., Rear tyre 3.50 × 19in.
- Wheelbase: 54 inches (1,400 mm)
- Dimensions: L: 83 inches (2,100 mm)
- Seat height: 28 inches (710 mm)
- Weight: 425 pounds (193 kg) (dry)

The Panther Model 100 is a British motorcycle. It has a 598 cc, 6.5:1 compression ratio, 87 mm × 100 mm (3.43 in × 3.94 in), OHV sloper engine in a frame where the engine forms the front down-tube. Phelon & Moore made motorcycles in Cleckheaton, Yorkshire, from 1904 to 1967, and branded them "Panther" from the 1920s onward. Launched in 1932, the Model 100 was made until 1963. While the engine and overall layout stayed essentially the same, the specifications evolved over these three decades.

== Development ==
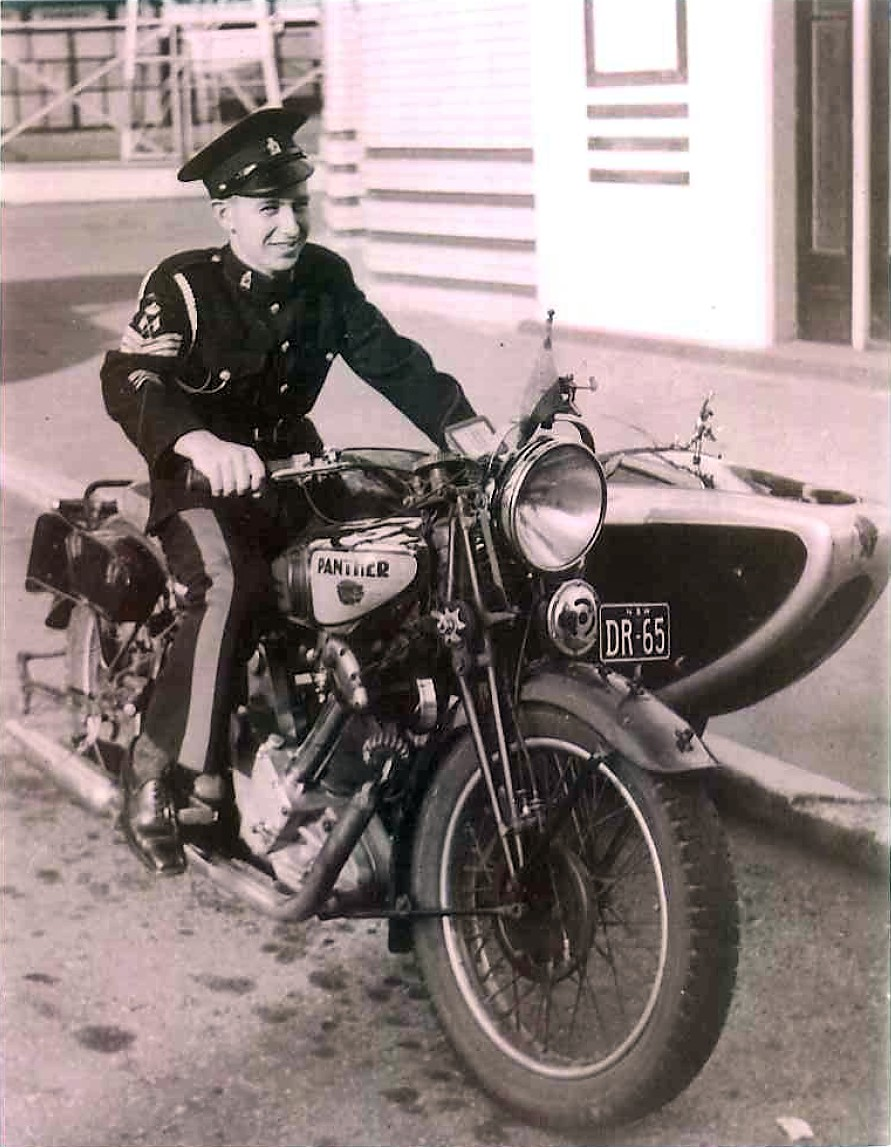
1937 Panther Model 100

A 598cc engine was used in the Model 85 Redwing (previously Model 80) from 1929 to 1930, and the Model 60 (previously Model 3) from 1928 to 1935. The Model 100 engine was largely a development from the Model 60. The earlier engines had compression ratios of either 5.4:1 (Model 60 pre-1930) or 7.0:1 (Model 85 and Model 60 post-1929). The frame is derived from the 1928 Panther and the tank from the 1932 Model 50. The history of the development of the Model 100 is as follows.

1932 - Model 100 launched. P&M 4-speed gearbox, Webb forks.

1933 - Sturmey-Archer 4-speed, hand-change gearbox introduced. Frame redesigned. Terry de luxe saddle.

1934 - Burman 4-speed foot-change gearbox introduced

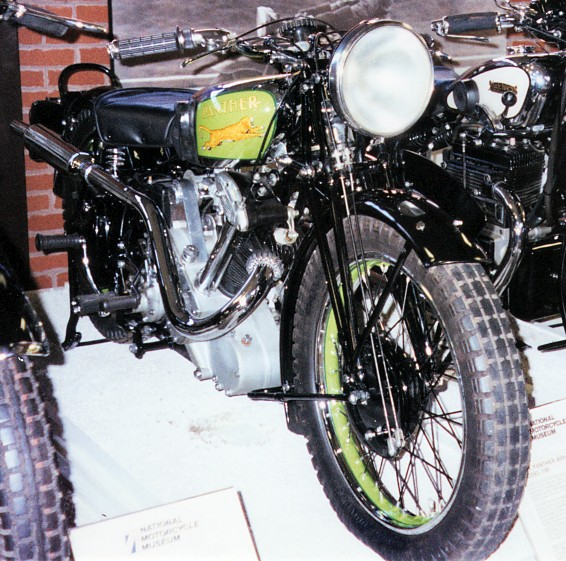
1935 Panther Model 100

1935 - Deeply finned sump and improved lubrication. This new bottom end remained almost unchanged for the next thirty years. This machine had a 6.5:1 compression ratio, 87 mm × 100 mm (3.43 in × 3.94 in), ohv sloper engine. The 1935 Model 100 was the machine on which Miss Florence Blenkiron and Miss Theresa Wallach undertook the epic journey from London to Cape Town, crossing the Sahara: the first such journey on a motorcycle combination.

1937 - New fully chromed fuel tank with red and black lined cream panels and snarling Panther logo. This was the last year of the "Redwing" Model 100

1938 - Kidney-shaped rocker cover introduced. Redwing designation dropped

1939 - Miller Dynamag replaces BTH magneto. 3.5 gallon tank introduced

1940 - Production ceased for World War II

1946 - Production resumed after war. Lucas magneto introduced.

1947 - Dowty Oleomatic forks introduced

1950 - Manual advance/retard reintroduced

1952 - Lucas Magdyno introduced

1954 - Swinging arm Model 100 introduced. Four gallon tank. Panther forks.

1955 - Amal 376 introduced

1956 - Amal 389 introduced. Heavy duty, sidecar trail. Panther forks.

1957 - Swinging arm Model 100 de luxe introduced. Last year of rigid Model 100. Dualseat as standard.

1963 - Model 100 last manufactured. It was the end of the line for 600 cc four stroke heavyweights. The 650 cc Model 120 continued for another three years

Snarling Panther logo

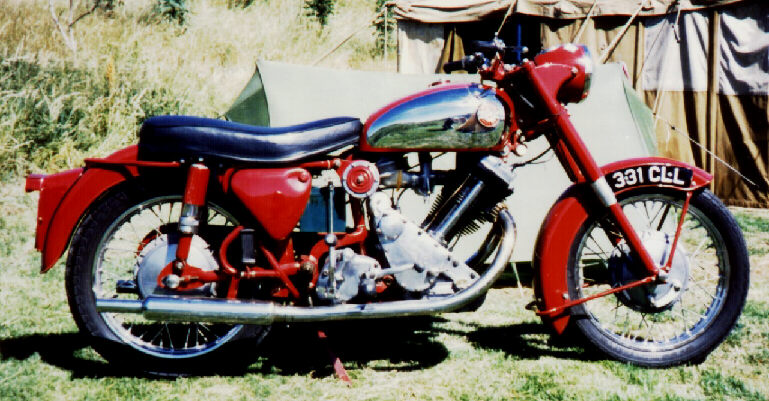
1961 Panther Model 100

== See also ==
- List of motorcycles of the 1930s
- List of motorcycles of the 1940s
- List of motorcycles of the 1950s
