= Theresa Wallach =

Long-distance motorcycle rider (1909–1999)

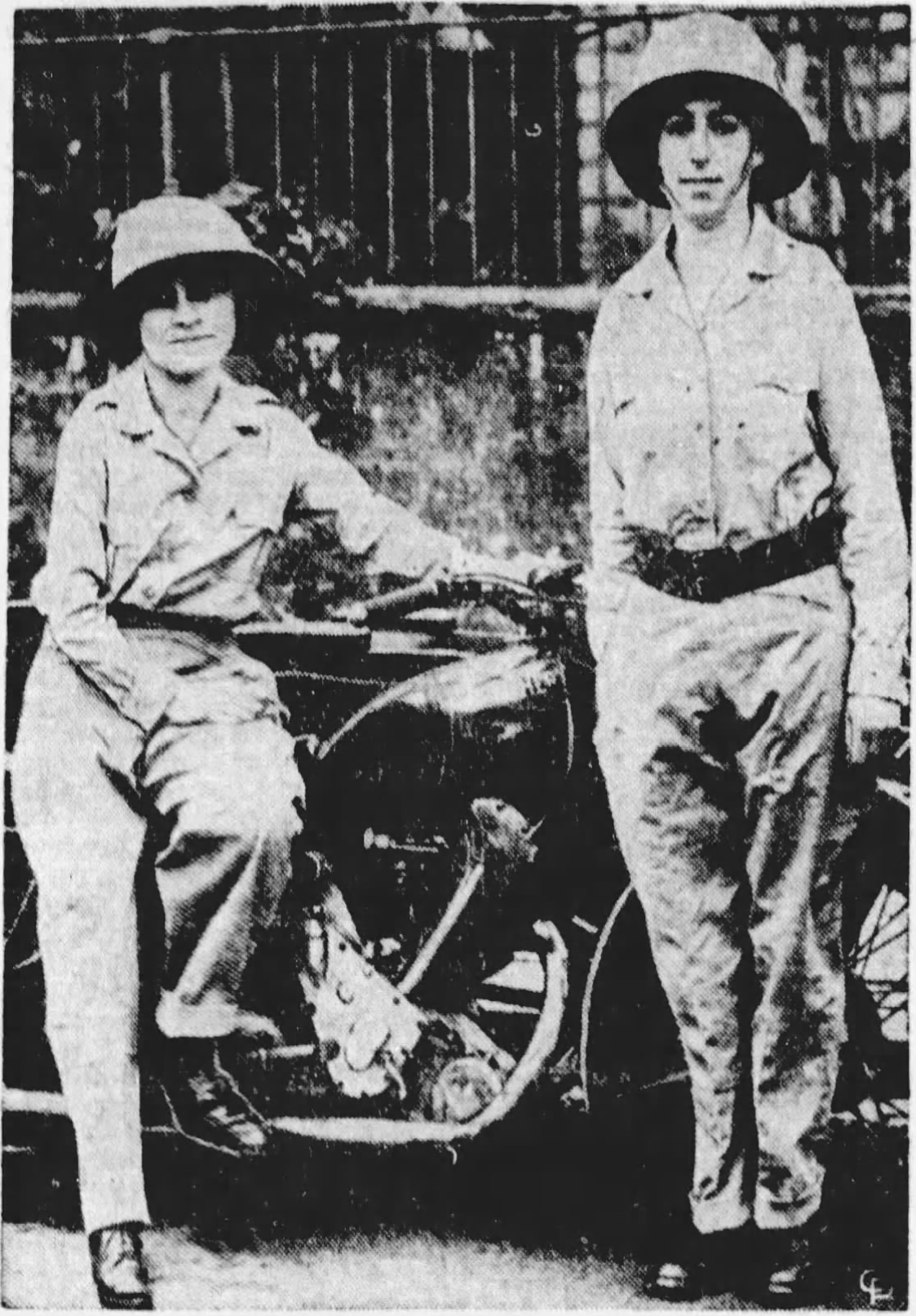
Blenkiron (left) and Wallach (right) beginning their London-Cape Town journey in 1934

Theresa Wallach (30 April 1909 – 30 April 1999) was an adventure motorcyclist, engineer, mechanic and author. In 1935 with another experienced motorcyclist named Florence Blenkiron, she rode a 600 cc single-cylinder Panther motorcycle complete with sidecar and trailer, from London to Cape Town, South Africa, crossing the Sahara desert, reportedly without a compass. Wallach was the first Vice President of the Women's International Motorcycle Association, and was inaugurated into the AMA Motorcycle Hall of Fame in 2003.

== Early life ==
Born at Stowe, Buckinghamshire, Wallach took her first engine apart on her bedroom floor aged 18. In 1928, she won a scholarship to study engineering at Northampton Polytechnic Institute (now known as City, University of London) and was for some time the only woman engineering student on her course. In 1929, she joined the staff at British Thomson-Houston Co Ltd, Willsden and in the same year she became a member of the Women's Engineering Society, writing that "to join is not only a pleasure, but a duty to encourage more girls into the realms of science". By 1932, she was working at the Hercules Engineering Company, at Isleworth, run by a Miss Cook. She was already competing in motorcycle races at Brooklands race track by this point.

== South African adventure: 11 December 1934 – 29 July 1935 ==
In December 1934, Wallach and Blenkiron departed on an expedition to Africa. They were seen off by Viscountess Astor, five other female MPs, and a host of well wishers. Viscountess Astor remarked that as an "unrepentant feminist" she would watch their progress with "pride and joy". Wallach noted that "we cannot afford to buy petrol and powder and cigarettes as well, so we just buy petrol". The pair travelled from London to Cape Town across the Sahara taking nearly eight months to complete the 13,500 mile journey. Regular updates of their progress were made in the British press. The pair endured extremes of climate, political debacles, mechanical failures and encounters with wild animals. Wallach captured their exploits in her book The Rugged Road (ed. by Barry Jones, 2001, Panther publications: ISBN 0953509826). Film footage from this journey survives.

On 26 May 1936, Wallach gave an account of her adventure to the Women's Engineering Society. The Woman Engineer reported that she referred "lightly to the endurance test of the Sahara, the wild beasts that approached sufficiently close for discomfort, though never for real, the snakes that became part of the day’s experiences, the encounters with tribes in varying degrees of civilisation, the tackling of problems connected with the cycle, with water, with other provisions, including petrol, and, finally to the enthusiastic welcome at Cape Town”.

Several years after this expedition, Wallach did not quite know where her future career lay and she placed a newspaper advertisement in 1938 seeking work as a 'Miss X'. The announcement read "Timbuctoo or anywhere - young lady holding world motor records wants job. – Denham, Bucks".

== Racing ==
In the spring of 1939, Wallach was the third of three women to gain a British Motorcycle Racing Club Gold Star at Brooklands on a 350 c.c. Norton, for lapping the track at an average speed of more than 100 miles per hour. The first two were Florence Blenkiron and Beatrice Shilling.

== Second World War ==
During the war, Wallach used her skills as a mechanic in the Auxiliary Territorial Service (A.T.S.) and became a woman dispatch rider in the British Army. She represented the A.T.S. at the Auto-Cycle Union’s National Rally 22–23 July 1939, where she gained a silver plaque. In 1942, she became the first female A.T.S. tank mechanic.

== Later life ==
After the war, Wallach toured the United States by motorbike for several years before opening her own motorcycle dealership specializing in British machines. In 1970, she published the successful Easy Motorcycle Riding (1970, Oaktree: ISBN 0706122623). In 1973, she sold her shop and moved to Phoenix, Arizona where she opened the 'Easy Riding Academy'. In addition to her riding school, Wallach was heavily involved in the formation and running of the Women's International Motorcycle Association. She served as WIMA's first Vice President, and was active in the association until her death. Wallach continued to ride motorbikes until she was 88, when vision problems forced her to give up her licence.
