= Florence Blenkiron =

British medal-winning motorcyclist and explorer

- Born: 24 April 1904; Harmby, North Yorkshire
- Died: 4 March 1991 (aged 86); Thornhaugh, Peterborough
- Other names: Florence Kingaby; Blenk
- Occupation: Motorcyclist
- Known for: First woman to win a gold medal racing motorcycles at Brooklands. With Theresa Wallach, she crossed travelled by motorcycle and side car from London to Cape Town.
- Spouse: Kenneth Malcolm Kingaby

Florence Margaret Charlotte Blenkiron (later Kingaby, also Margaret Kingaby; 24 April 1904 – 4 March 1991) was the first woman to win a gold medal for reaching over 100 mph on a motorcycle at Brooklands race track. With Theresa Wallach, she crossed the Sahara by 600cc Panther motorcycle, sidecar and trailer from London to Cape Town in 1934–35, making the return journey on her own in 1935–36.

== Early life ==
Florence Margaret Charlotte Blenkiron was born in Harmby, Yorkshire to John Blenkiron and Mary (née Ainsley Atkinson). She had one older brother, John William Amiby Blenkiron (b.1900). Her father was grocer's assistant in 1901 census, but by 1911, the family were living in Ellerton Abbey, Marrick, in the North Riding of Yorkshire, where the extended Blenkiron family had lived for generations. In 1911 her father was listed as living on private means.

== Early working life ==
Blenkiron became Secretary to Robert Hadfield, owner of Hadfield's Steel Foundry in Sheffield, one of the largest foundries in the world.

== Motorcycle racing ==
Blenkiron rode her first motorcycle at the age of sixteen. She joined in the first Ladies Race at Brooklands race course in 1928 which had been organised by Lady Malcolm Campbell. Her next race at Brooklands was on 30 September 1933 which is when it is thought she first met Theresa Wallach. On 18 October 1933, Blenkiron won her first race, the Three-lap All-Comer's Handicap, becoming the first woman to win a race open to both men and women. Blenkiron and Wallach joined various motorcycle groups and competed in competitions to improve their skills. They shared a house in south London and Wallach took to calling Florence "Blenk".

On 14 April 1934, Blenkiron became the first woman to break the 100-mile per hour barrier on a motorcycle, riding a 500cc Grindlay-Peerless bike. She reached the speed of 102.06 mph and was awarded the British Motor Cycle Racing Club's Gold Star Award. Only two other women have ever received this award, Beatrice Shilling in August 1934 and Theresa Wallach in 1939.

Blenkiron was interested in visiting family friends in Cape Town and after a joking conversation about getting there by motorcycle, the two women started to plan a trip in earnest. The planning took over a year, and sponsorship was hard to come by at first, until Phelon and Moore Ltd. became interested in the project, offering them a choice of model from their catalogue. They chose a 600cc Panther, registration number YG 7474. Other sponsors then emerged, including the provision of the trailer and sidecar by Watsonian Squire, and Blenkiron proceeded to stress test the equipment at various events in 1934.

== Journey to Cape Town - The Rugged Road ==
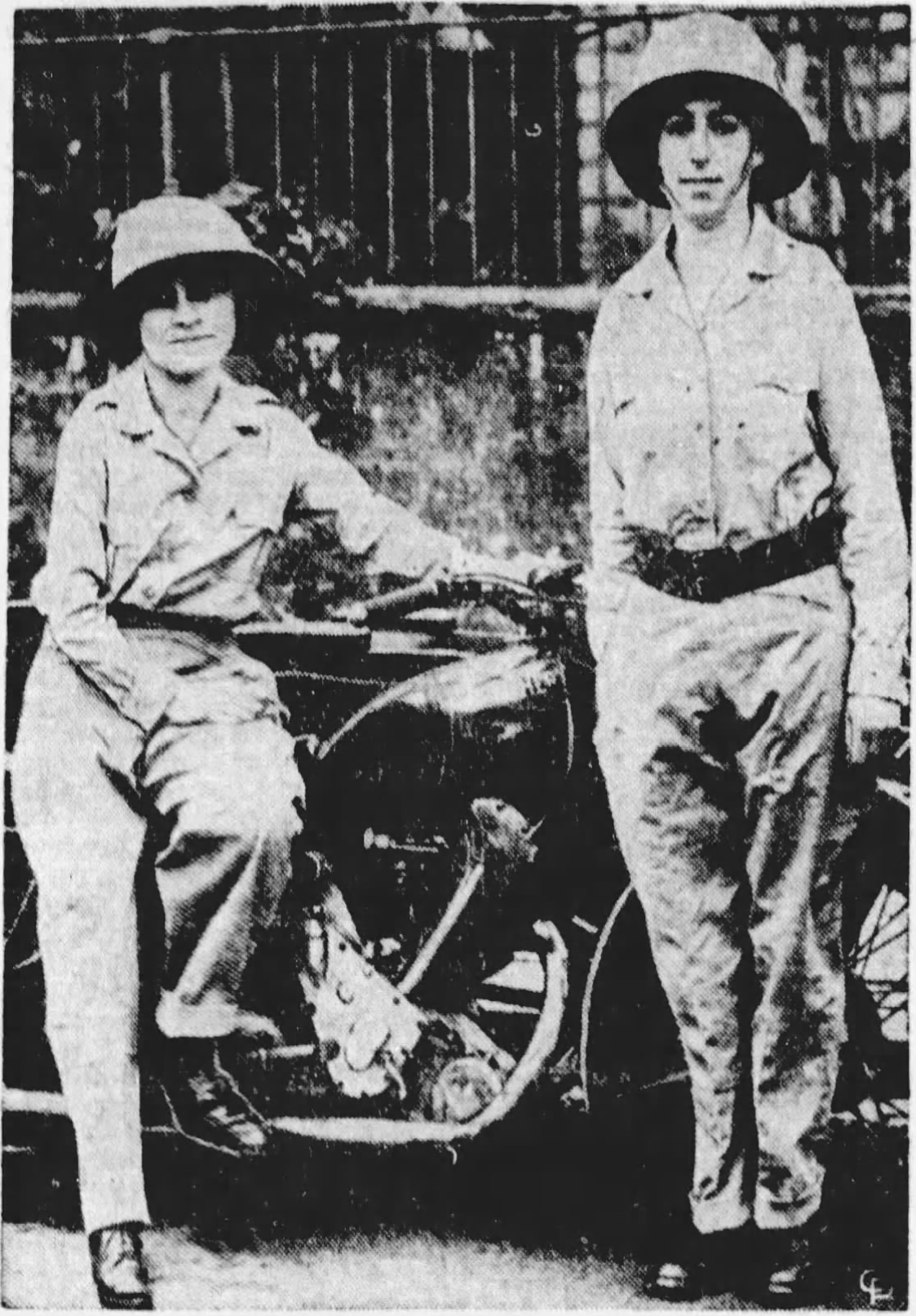
Blenkiron (left) and Wallach (right) beginning their London-Cape Town journey in 1934

On 11 December 1934, Blenkiron and Theresa Wallach set out from Crown House, Aldwych in London to Cape Town, South Africa, on their 600cc single-cylinder Panther motorcycle named "Venture" with sidecar and trailer, seen off by a crowd which included Lady Astor, the first woman MP, and the High Commissioner of what was then South Rhodesia. The event was widely reported in the press, as was their progress on the journey.

In June 1935, the Woman Engineer journal reported "Miss Wallach and Miss Blenkiron are now heading for Nairobi on their motorcycle combination; some of their more unpleasant adventures have included four nights in a tropical jungle without food or shelter, and capture by Tourags in the desert".

The route they had planned took them through Folkestone, Boulogne, Paris, Marseilles, Algiers to Ghardaia, In Salah to Tamanrassat then via In Guezzam to Agadez. Leaving there on 4 March 1935, then travelled through to Katsina by 11 March then to Kano, and to Fort Archambault by 19 April. From there they travelled to Ekibondo by 30 April, passing Mt Ruwenzori to Kampala, then Nairobi arriving in Arusha by 5 June. They travelled past Mt Kilimanjaro, reaching Iringa by 11 June, then via Victoria Falls, through Bulawayo reaching Beitbridge by 11 July.

They finally arrived in Cape Town on 29 July 1935, having recorded snippets of their journey on film and still photographs.

== Return journey to London ==
Although the original plan has been for both women to ride the return journey Theresa Wallach left Cape Town for London by ship.

Blenkiron left Cape Town alone on the "Venture II" motorcycle and sidecar on 18 September 1935. She is thought to have travelled through Salisbury, Nairobi, Faradje, Niangara, Bula, Fardje, Marouna and forced to abandon travelling by motorcycle and tow it behind a bus from Kano as the local authorities were unwilling for her to travel alone due to the cost of a potential rescue mission. She reached Algiers by 10 February 1936 and completed the journey back to London by April 1936 where she arrived to meet the High Commissioner for (what was then) South Rhodesia at Rhodesia House and present him with a letter from the Prime Minister of South Africa.

== After the journey ==
In an interview on her return, Blenkiron said she was planning to write a book about the experiences, but this never materialised. She published "Exclusive Graphic Story" in the Newcastle Sunday Sun on 3 May 1936, illustrated with some photographs of the journey.

Blenkiron was elected as an Associate Member of the Women's Engineering Society in 1938 in recognition of the journey to Cape Town and back, along with her considerable experience of the administrative side of steel production whilst working for the foundry firm Hadfields Ltd.

In 1937, Blenkiron began to advertise her services as a chauffeur and tour guide. She placed an advert in The Woman Engineer journal for "Valet Motoring Go wherever you will, not where you must Private Tours at home and abroad arranged exclusively to please you and your friends Miss Florence Blenkiron experienced courier, with own 18 h.p. 7-seater de luxe saloon, will drive, conduct and attend to your personal requirements en route. Specialist in African Travel. Also hour, day or period hire, and sightseeing drives. Terms by arrangement 174, Holland Park Avenue, London W.11 Tel: Park 7330".

In 1938, Blenkiron's chauffeuring business took her to Melbourne, Australia, on board the SS Orcades as a chauffeuse and companion, touring the country.

== World War Two ==
In December 1939, The Woman Engineer reported that Blenkiron "came back post haste from Australia when war was declared. She hopes to be allowed to do her "bit" without further delay" and by autumn 1940 it was able to share that "Miss Florence Blenkiron A.T.S..is to sail shortly for Kenya with the Mechanised Transport Corps.".

Blenkiron wrote to the Women's Engineering Society from Pretoria in the summer of 1941 that "we are housed in most comfortable huts in the military quarters and have helped the transport workers generally, driving cars, six wheeled lorries etc... it is awfully difficult to know just how much one may say in a letter so I think perhaps I should wait until I can relate my experiences at the end of the war" and that she had just received marching orders to go north.

By July 1941, Blenkiron was at Mena, just outside Cairo, with the Palestine Women Drivers Unit where she was in charge of convoys of trucks and armoured vehicles, covering Egypt, Palestine and Syria. She received a 2nd Subaltern commission in September 1941. By May 1942 she was one of two officers at the Mena School of Military Driving and Maintenance, testing drivers and teaching maintenance to women from Palestine, Syrian men, British and other ranks in the ATS. She was also responsible for teaching a driving and maintenance course for all United Nations Relief and Rehabilitation Administration personnel sent on service to Egypt, which they had to pass before being allowed access to military vehicles.

In 1945, Blenkiron was mentioned in Despatches and in charge of 30 buses driven by Palestinian women in Cairo for the transportation of Army Officers between their place of residence and Headquarters.

== Marriage in India ==
In 1945, Blenkiron requested a move to Calcutta (Kolcata) in India to join the staff of the YMCA War Services Club, where she took charge of transport. She met Kenneth Malcolm Kingaby there whilst he was a serving army officer. In November 1945 she resigned her commission and they married in January 1946, moving to Bombay (Mumbai) where Florence took over running the YMCA War Services Club. Florence returned to Britain for a month arriving at Tilbury on 3 November 1947 on the ship Strathmore and leaving Liverpool for Bombay on the Empress of India in December 1947. Once the club closed and Kenneth was demobbed from the army, he worked for an American pharmaceutical and Florence project managed the restoration of a factory for his company, before they returned to Britain in 1955. Around this time she started to go by the name Margaret Kingaby. They took up farming in Somerset but after a coronary thrombosis, Kenneth's health meant they had to give this up in 1959. He became accountant for a large estate near Peterborough, then owned by William Scott Abbott, today known as Sacrewell Farm. They lived in a bungalow, Windgate Way, and continued to live there after Kenneth's retirement.

== Death and commemoration ==
Florence Kingaby died on 4 Mar 1991, after a stroke she had moved to a nursing home, in Thornhaugh, Peterborough.

In 2018, a collection of previously unknown 66 Ilford Special Lantern Plate glass slides (8.3 cm x 8.3 cm) in a Union Jack patterned box, showing the 'Venture' Panther motorcycle and sidecar, and scenes and countryside along the route of Florence and Theresa's journey from London to Cape Town were sold by auction at Toovey's Auction House in West Sussex. They made £1300.
