= Panther Model 75 =

Motorcycle

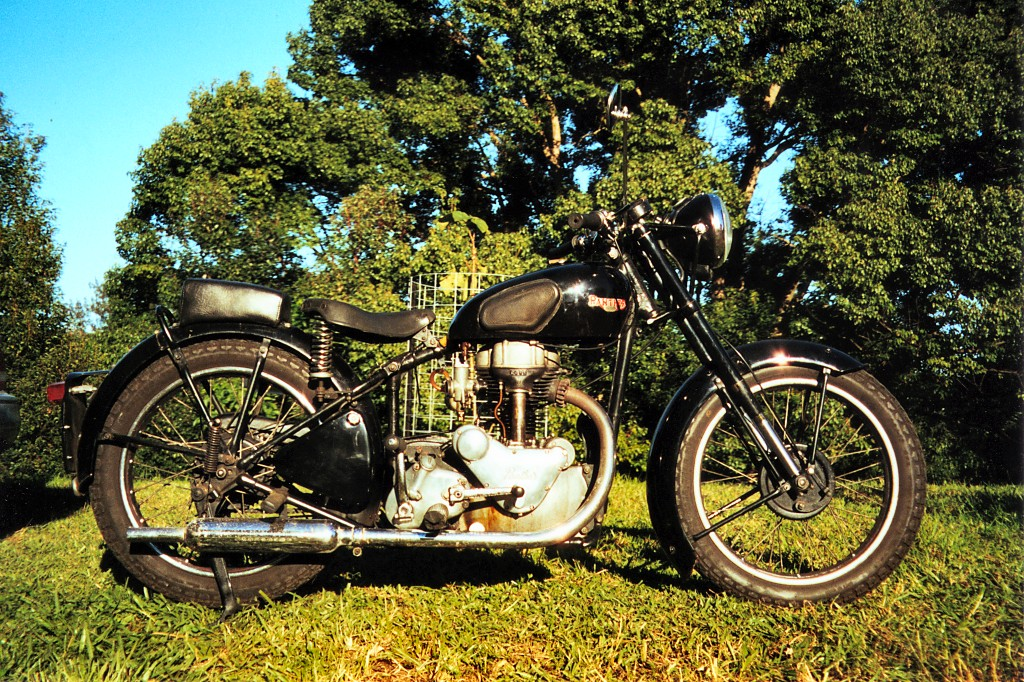
- Manufacturer: Phelon & Moore
- Production: 1948 - 1962
- Predecessor: Model 70
- Engine: 348cc air cooled, single cylinder, overhead valve
- Tires: 26" x 3.25" front and rear

The Model 75 Panther motorcycle had a 348cc, 6.5:1 (later 6.7:1) compression ratio, 71 x 88 mm, ohv vertical engine in a relatively standard frame. It was developed from the 1948 Model 70. In many respects it was similar to the 248cc Model 65. The Model 75 had Lucas K1F magneto ignition. The gearbox was Burman CP four speed unit with a ratio of 5.25:1. The frame was a heavy duty cradle with a single saddle down tube. A swinging arm model was introduced in 1953. The Dowty forks that initially provided front suspension were later replaced with the P&M telescopic forks. Wheels were 26" x 3.25" front and rear initially with 6" half width hubs and later optional alloy hubs were offered.

== Development ==
This model was largely a development of the Model 70.

- 1948 - Production of the new 1949 model commenced in October
- 1949 - The Model 75 was launched as a rigid.
- 1951 - 6.5" Rear brake replaces 6" unit. Stroud MkII version introduced
- 1952 - Colour scheme change

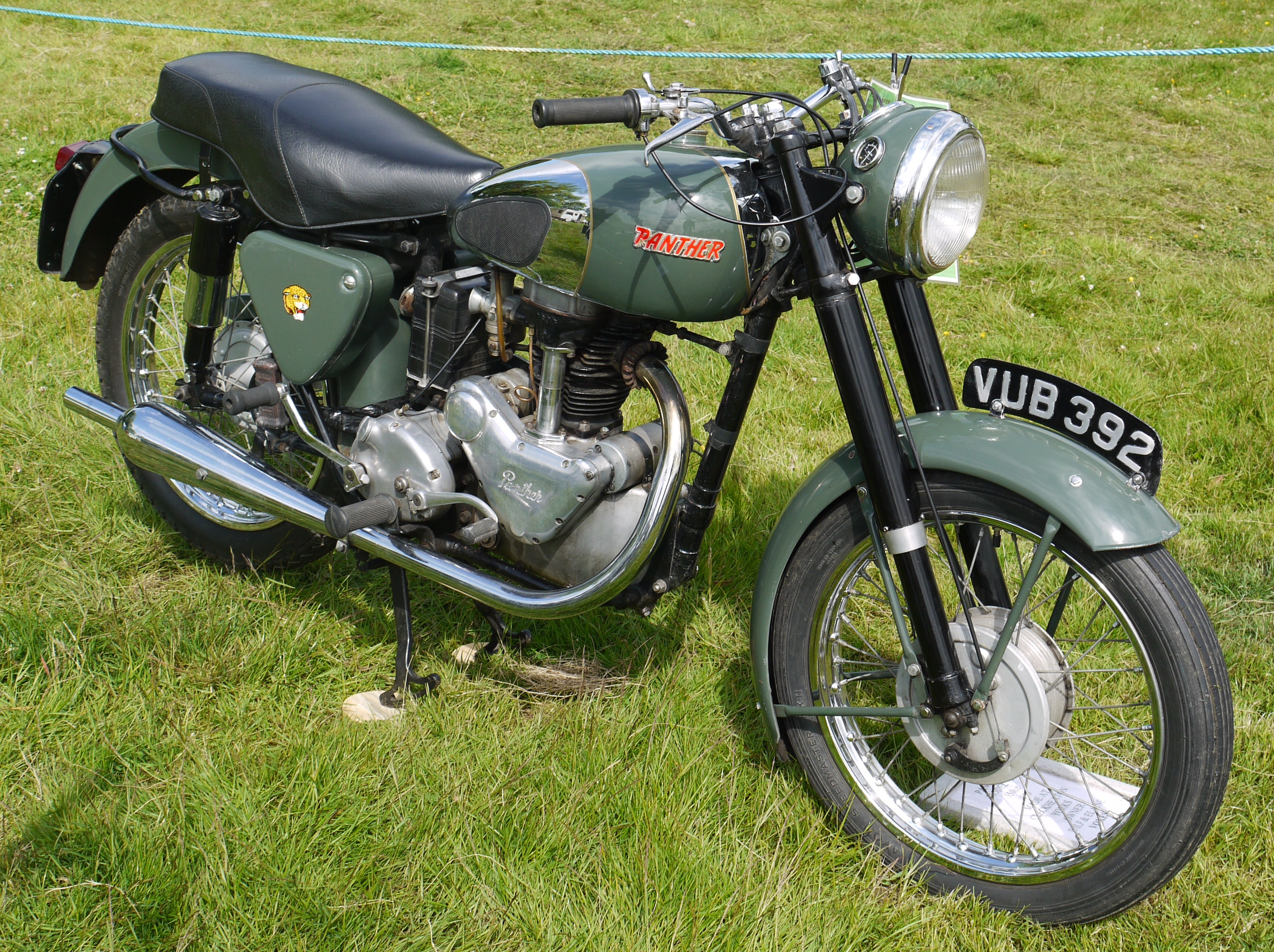
Model 75 1955 onwards

- 1953 - A swinging arm version was launched featuring new P&M telescopic forks.
- 1954 - Dowty forks replaced by P&M forks. Rigid model last manufactured. Improved swinging arm rear frame introduced.
- 1955 - New alloy wheel hubs introduced
- 1956 - 3.25 gallon tank replaces 3 gallon tank, Amal Monobloc introduced, colour change
- 1957 - Dualseat became standard
- 1962 - Swinging-arm version last manufactured. End of the line for 350 cc four stroke lightweights.

== Technical Information ==
=== Engine Numbers ===
Engine Numbers are of the following format yyKxxxz where:

- yy stands for the year of manufacture (add 40 if it is a single digit),
- K is the definitive code for a Model 75. Other letters may follow the K:
  - KS swinging arm
  - KX Stroud
  - KA alloy head
- xxx stands for the serial number, and
- z stands for the modification code.

=== Detailed Technical Specifications ===
From "Modern Motorcycle Maintenance"

Tappet Clearance (cold)
Inlet, nil.
Exhaust, nil.

Valve Timing
Inlet opens before T.D.C., 10 degrees.
Inlet closes after B.D.C., 45 degrees.
Exhaust opens before B.D.C., 65 degrees.
Exhaust closes after T.D.C., 15 degrees.

Tappet Clearances for Valve Settings (hot)
Inlet, nil.
Exhaust, nil.

Ignition Advance
35 degrees full advance.

Valve Guides Protrude from Cylinder Head
Inlet, .875 in.
Exhaust, .875 in.

Cylinder Bore in Inches
2.7955 ins.
Rebore to plus .010 in. when bore exceeds 2.8005 ins.

Piston Clearances
Top land, .0131 in. to .014 in.
Top skirt, .005 in.
Bottom skirt, .0043in.

Piston Rings
End gap, .011 in. to .016 in.
Vertical play, .001 in. and .002 in. on scraper.

Main Bearings
Driving side: 1 in. bore plain journals.
Timing side: 1 in. bore plain journals.

Mainshaft
End float, .030 in.

Big-end/Connecting-rod
Side play, .016 in. to .034 in.

Big-end Bearing
Type: Hardened steel, double roller.
Recondition when noisy.

Gearbox
Bearings, types and sizes:

40mm by 17mm by 12mm.
62mm by 1 9/32 ins. by 16mm. (ball races).

Bushes, reamed to: .8475 in.+.001 in.; .6215 in.+.001 in.; .312 in.+.001 in.; .811 in.+.001 in.; .670 in.+.001 in.; .499 in.+.001 in.;.914 in.+.001 in.

Fine-limit Diameters
Connecting-rod: Little end, .750 in. + .001 in. / -.0000 in.
Camshaft bushes, .. .5625 in.+ .000 in. / -.0005 in.

and .625 in. + .000 in. / -.0005 in.

Idler wheels .. .. .5625 in.+ .001 in. / -.0000 in.
Tappet guides .. .. .250 in.+ .001 in. / -.0000 in.
Cam-followers .. .. .5625 in.- .001 in.

Left-hand Threads
Nil.

Special Tools Available from Makers for Comprehensive Overhaul
Dowty fork key.
Valve spring remover.
Engine sprocket remover.
Main pinion extractor.
Clutch spanner.
Crankpin and engine shaft nut spanner.
Tappet stud extractor.
Ball race fitting tool.
Dynamo pinion extractor.
Exhaust nut spanner.

=== Carburettor Settings ===
Bike			Carburettor				Jet		Throttle		Needle Jet		Other	
Model	Year	Spec	Make	Type	Bore	Block	Main	Pilot	Slide	Cut-away	Jet	Groove	Note	Source
M75	1947-54		Amal	275	7/8"	205/058R	110		5	/4	Std.	3		
Stroud 350	1950-52	Mk II	Amal	275BD/1C	7/8"	205/058R	110		5	/4	Std.	3		
Stroud	1953	Mk III	Amal	276FW/1B	1"	205/058R	150		6	/3	Std.	3		
M75	1954-5		Amal	276	1" ?		160		6	/4	Std.	3		,
Stroud	1954		Amal	276GL/1A	1"	205/058R	160		6	/4	Std.	3	Air filter	
M75	1956-8		Amal	Monobloc 376			160	30	376	/4		2		
