= Cabton =

Defunct Japanese motorcycle manufacturer

- Industry: Motorcycle manufacturers
- Founded: 1933 in Osaka, Kansai region, Japan
- Founder: Koushiro Nakagawa and son
- Defunct: 1960
- Headquarters: Inuyama, Aichi Prefecture, Japan

Cabton is a defunct brand of Japanese motorcycles based in originally in Osaka, Kansai region and later in Inuyama, Aichi Prefecture, that produced motorcycles from 1933 to 1960. The company was started in Osaka by Koushiro Nakagawa and his son. The name is supposed to originate from the slogan "Come and buy to Osaka, Nakagawa".

== History ==
Their first machine was a 346 cc ohv single copied from a British Ariel, although most of the production in the early years was lightweight two-strokes copied from British machines. Prior to 1940 they were Japan's largest motorcycle manufacture, and supplied Japan's armed forces throughout WWII.

In 1954, the company was taken over by Mizuho Motor Manufacture Inc, and production transferred to Inuyama. By the mid 1950s Cabton were producing a range of 250 cc to 600 cc ohv single and twin-cylinder motorcycles and were the 4th largest motorcycle manufacturer in Japan. The engines were copies of British and American units and were made by Mitsubishi, and the gearboxes were copies of the Burman units. The machines featured tubular frames, plunger rear suspension and telescopic forks. Cabton were the first Japanese manufacturer to fit telescopic forks to their machines. Nearly 10,000 machines were produced in 1955.

The flagship model of the range was the 600 FXT (later designated the 600 RTS). The engine was a copy of the engine fitted to the Indian Scout, even down to the Amal 276 carburettors. The motorcycle was known for its speed but was expensive, costing the equivalent of a year's salary for a Japanese worker. A more powerful 600 RV version was also offered.

Small capacity machines, 125–250 cc two-strokes, were marketed under the Mizuho brand.

Cabton were unable to compete with other Japanese manufacturers such as Honda, Suzuki and Yamaha who we producing lighter, cheaper home-designed machine, production was wound-down in 1958 and the company closed in 1960.

== Bibliography ==
- Alexander, Jeffrey W. (2009). Japan's Motorcycle Wars: An Industry History. UBC Press. ISBN 978-0-7748-5844-1.
- Davis, Miles (July 2004). "Early Days of Japanese Motorcycles". Walneck's Classic Cycle Trader. Causey Enterprises, LLC.
- Ensanian, Armand (2016). Discovering the Motorcycle: The History. The Culture. The Machines. Hillcrest Publishing Group. ISBN 978-0-9963919-0-0.
- O'Clair, Jim (December 2017). "1955 Cabton 600CC FXT". Hemmings Motor News.
- Tragatsch, Erwin (1977). The complete illustrated encyclopedia of the world's motorcycles (1st ed.). New York: Holt, Rinehart and Winston. ISBN 978-0-03-019296-8.
- Walker, Mick (2004). Japanese Production Racing Motorcycles. Redline Books. ISBN 978-0-9544357-0-7.
- Wilson, Hugo (1995). The encyclopedia of the motorcycle (1st ed.). London: Dorling Kindersley. ISBN 978-0-7894-0150-2.
