= McGuffie =

McGuffie is a surname. Notable people with the surname include:

- Bill McGuffie (1927–1987), British composer
- Craig McGuffie (born 1997), Scottish footballer
- Louis McGuffie (1893–1918), Scottish World War I Victoria Cross recipient
- Ryan McGuffie (born 1980), Scottish footballer
- Sam McGuffie (born 1989), American football player
- Sheila McGuffie (1911–2007), English aeronautical engineer
- Walter McGuffie (1916–1996), British Olympic wrestler
- Will McGuffie (born 2000), English footballer
