= Phelon & Rayner 1.75 hp =

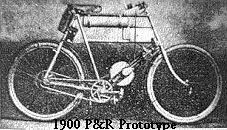
- Manufacturer: Phelon & Rayner
- Production: 1901 - 1903
- Engine: 260cc
- Transmission: single speed friction disc

The Phelon & Rayner 1.75 hp was a British motorcycle made by Phelon and Rayner (P&R). There was only one P&R model which had a 1.75 h.p., 260 cc. engine with 66 x 76 mm bore and stroke fitted in a standard bicycle type 28" frame (with 23" and 26" options). It was fitted with a surface carburettor, single speed friction disc transmission, a 9 pint combined oil and fuel tank, bicycle pattern front forks and 28 in × 2 in (711 mm × 51 mm) wheels (except for the 23" frame option that had 26" x 1&5/8" wheels). The colour scheme was black frame and mudguards with an aluminium enameled fuel tank with coach lining.

The prototype was the basis for a patented design. The key innovation was to replace the frame's front down-tube with a four rod frame that held a small de Dion type engine. This 'Sloper' engine was the hallmark of P&M / Panther motorcycles until the last Model 120 more than sixty years later. Production machines of the same design as this prototype were hand-built in 1901 through to 1903.

== Development ==
This model was the first motorcycle produced by P&R.

1900 prototype built resulting in design being patented. The key innovation was to replace the frame's front down-tube with a four rod frame that held a small de Dion type engine. This 'Sloper' engine was the hallmark of P&M / Panther motorcycles until the last Panther Model 120 more than sixty years later. Production machines of the same design as this prototype were hand-built in 1901 through to 1903. This prototype machine also featured a further patented innovation: a half compression device to make starting easier. This featured on all future heavyweight P&M / Panther motorcycles.

1901 was the first year of production of the Phelon and Rayner (P&R) 1.75 hp. It had a 1.75 h.p., 260cc. engine with 66 x 76 mm bore and stroke fitted in a standard bicycle type 28" frame (although 26" and 23" became options, presumably due to experience showing 28" was too tall for a motorised bicycle). It was fitted with a surface carburettor, single speed friction disc transmission, a 9 pint combined oil and fuel tank, bicycle pattern front forks and 28 in × 2 in (711 mm × 51 mm) wheels (although smaller wheels were fitted to the smaller frame). The colour scheme was black frame and mudguards with an aluminium enameled fuel tank with coach lining.

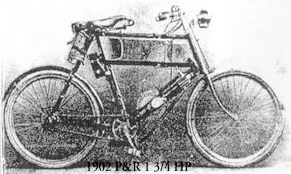
1902 P&R Motorcycle

1902 was the second year of production of the 1.75 hp. It was fitted with a surface carburettor, single speed friction disc transmission, a 9 pint combined oil and fuel tank, bicycle pattern front forks and 8 in × 2 in (203 mm × 51 mm) wheels (although smaller wheels were fitted to the smaller frame). The colour scheme was black frame and mudguards with an aluminium enameled fuel tank with coach lining. Photographic evidence indicates it was available with (carbide) lights.

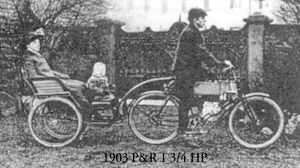
1903 P&R Motorcycle pulling a trailer chair

1903 was the last year of production of the Phelon & Rayner 1.75 hp. Photographic evidence shows it was used to pull a trailer chair.
