= Panther TT Entrant =

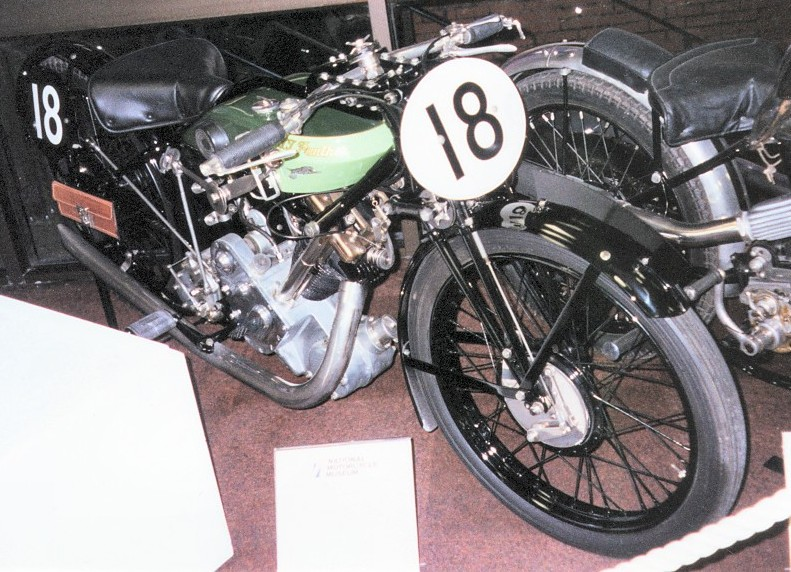
- Manufacturer: Phelon & Moore
- Production: 1924–1928
- Engine: 498cc ohv sloper engine
- Power: 25bhp

The Panther TT Entrant was a British motorcycle made in 1924 by Phelon & Moore and was the first to carry the name "Panther". With a number of wins in other races and trials, it was decided to enter the new machine into the Isle of Man TT. Whilst originally intended to be stock, these models were modified for the purpose and in later years TT Replica machines were catalogued, however there is no record of any machines being sold to the public. The TT Entrant machines had a 25 bhp 498cc, 6.5:1 compression ratio, 84 x 90 mm, ohv sloper engine. Launched in 1924, TT Entrants were made through to 1928.

== Development ==
The TT Entrants were based on the new Panther machine, launched in 1924.

1927 – No works entrant to the TT, only a private entrant.

1928 – (a.k.a. Model 4 or 4a) Sumpless 490 cc engine with external pushrods and a P&M four-speed close ratio gearbox

== Technical Information ==
=== Engine Numbers ===
Engine Numbers in this period are a matter of uncertainty.
