= Miss Shilling's orifice =

Fuel flow restrictor retro-fitted to Merlin engines

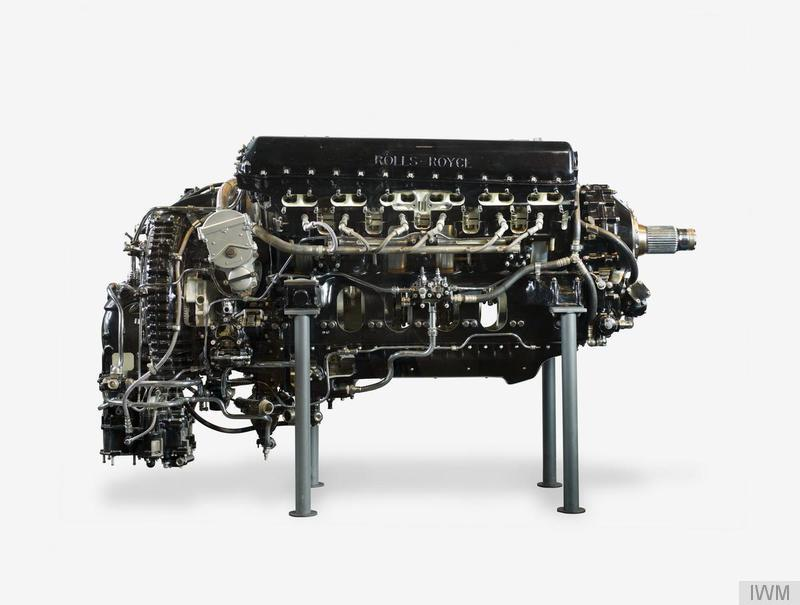
The Rolls-Royce Merlin engine originally came with an updraught carburettor, prone to cut-out due to fuel flooding in negative G.

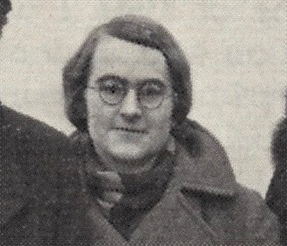
Beatrice Shilling

Miss Shilling's orifice was a technical device created to counter engine cut-outs experienced during negative G manoeuvres in early Spitfire and Hurricane fighter aircraft during the Battle of Britain. Officially called the R.A.E. restrictor, it was referred to under various names, such as Miss Tilly's diaphragm or the Tilly orifice in reference to its inventor, Beatrice "Tilly" Shilling.

== Engine cut-out problems ==
Early versions of the Rolls-Royce Merlin engine came equipped with dual-choke updraught SU carburettor. When an aeroplane equipped with such an engine performed a negative g force manoeuvre (pitching the nose hard down), fuel was forced up to the top of the carburettor's float chamber rather than down into the engine, leading to loss of power. If the negative g continued, fuel collecting in the float chamber would force the float to the floor of the chamber. Since this float controlled the needle valve that regulated fuel intake, the carburettor would flood and drown the supercharger with an over-rich mixture. The consequent rich mixture cut-out would shut down the engine completely.

During the Battle of France and Battle of Britain, the RAF encountered German fighters which had gasoline direct injection engines and did not suffer from this problem, as injection pumps kept fuel at constant pressure. German pilots could exploit this by pitching steeply forward while opening the throttle, a manoeuvre that pursuing British aircraft could not copy. The British countermeasure was a half roll when following a German aircraft into a dive so the aircraft would only be subjected to positive g, but this could take extra time, allowing the enemy to escape.

== The RAE restrictor ==
Complaints from pilots over engine cut-out during dives and brief inverted flight led to concentrated search for a solution. Engine manufacturer Rolls-Royce produced an improved carburettor, but this failed in testing. Beatrice Shilling, an engineer working at the Royal Aircraft Establishment at Farnborough Airfield, invented a device which could be fitted without taking the aircraft out of service. She designed a thimble-shaped brass flow restrictor with precisely calculated dimensions to allow just enough fuel flow for maximum engine power. It came in two versions, one for 12 pounds per square inch (83 kPa) manifold pressure and another for the 15 psi (100 kPa) achieved by supercharged units. The design of the thimble-shaped flow restrictor was later refined to a simplified flat brass washer.

While not completely solving the problem, the restrictor, along with modifications to the needle valve, permitted pilots to perform quick negative g manoeuvres without loss of engine power. This improvement solved the drawback of the RAF's Rolls-Royce Merlin-powered fighters versus the German Messerschmitt Bf 109E machine. The Daimler-Benz DB 601 inverted V12 powerplant had utilised fuel injection since 1937. During early 1941, Shilling travelled with a small team to fit the restrictors in one RAF base after another, giving priority to front-line units. By March 1941 the device had been installed throughout RAF Fighter Command. Officially named the 'R.A.E. restrictor', the device was immensely popular with pilots, adopting the affectionate nickname 'Miss Shilling's orifice' (or simply the 'Tilly orifice'), given to the restrictor by Sir Stanley Hooker, the engineer who led supercharger development at Rolls-Royce.

This measure was only a stopgap: it did not allow inverted flight for any length of time. The problems were not finally overcome until introduction of the Bendix pressure carburettor in 1943.
