= Beatrice Shilling =

British aeronautical engineer (1909–1990)

Beatrice Shilling OBE
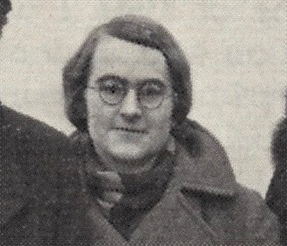
- c. 1930s
- Born: 8 March 1909; Waterlooville, Hampshire, England
- Died: 18 November 1990 (aged 81)
- Education: Victoria University of Manchester
- Occupation: Aeronautical engineer
- Years active: 1930s-1969
- Employer: Royal Aircraft Establishment
- Organization: Women's Engineering Society
- Known for: Rolls-Royce Merlin; Blue Streak missile; Motorcycle racing
- Spouse: George Naylor
- Awards: Officer of the Order of the British Empire (1949); British Motorcycle Racing Club (Gold Star) (1934); Honorary doctorate University of Surrey

Beatrice Shilling OBE (known as Tilly) (8 March 1909 – 18 November 1990) was an English aeronautical engineer, motorcycle racer and sports car racer. In 1949, Shilling was made an Officer of the Order of the British Empire.

During the Second World War Shilling designed the RAE Restrictor (which became known as Miss Shilling's orifice), a simple device that overcame the problem of the Rolls-Royce Merlin aeroplane engines losing power during negative-g manoeuvres. After the war, Shilling also worked on the Blue Streak missile, researched the effect of a wet runway upon braking, and helped design and build a bobsled for the Royal Air Force's Olympic team.

As a motorcycle racer, Shilling is one of only three women who have received the British Motorcycle Racing Club Gold Star for having lapped the Brooklands circuit at over 100 miles per hour (160 km/h) on a motorcycle. In sports car racing, she scored several podium finishes at the Goodwood Circuit Members' Meetings.

== Early life ==
Shilling was born at Waterlooville, Hampshire, the daughter of Henry Shilling (1852–1936), a butcher, and his wife Annie (Nancy), née Dulake (1873–1954). As a child Shilling spent her pocket money on hand tools and won a prize in a national Meccano contest. At 14 she bought herself a motorcycle, following which she taught herself how to disassemble and reassemble its two-stroke engine; she was already determined to become an engineer.

After completing secondary school she worked for an electrical engineering company for three years, installing wiring and generators. In January 1928, she wrote an article for The Electrical Age, the magazine of the Electrical Association for Women, with her fellow apprentice Mona Willis, entitled "How We Wired a House in Paradise", describing their efforts to install eight lights over three days in an old house. In 1929, she wrote another article for the magazine, explaining how to make a home wireless set. Both pieces were aimed at Girl Guides. Her employer, Margaret Partridge, encouraged her to study electrical engineering at the Victoria University of Manchester; in 1932, alongside Sheila McGuffie, she received a bachelor's degree and then studied for a further year to get a Master of Science degree in mechanical engineering.

Jobs were hard to find in the Great Depression; she worked as a research assistant for Professor G. F. Mucklow at the University of Birmingham. In 1936 she was recruited as a scientific officer by the Royal Aircraft Establishment (RAE), the research and development agency of the Royal Air Force (RAF) in Farnborough, Hampshire. Her first position was as a technical author with the Air Ministry's technical publications department. She was allowed to transfer to doing work on aircraft engines. On 1 November 1939 she was promoted to become technical officer in charge of carburettor research and development and later promoted again to principal technical officer.

Even as a senior member of staff she was respected by the factory workers for her hands-on skills, such as brazing a copper butt-joint with the skills of a dedicated fitter.

== Royal Aircraft Establishment ==
Shilling worked on many projects for the Royal Aircraft Establishment (RAE) during the Second World War, the best-known of which was the RAE Restrictor modification (also known as Miss Shilling's Orifice) that solved the problem of Rolls-Royce Merlin engines stalling during negative-g flight.

=== The RAE Restrictor ===
During the Battle of France and Battle of Britain in 1940, RAF pilots discovered a serious problem in fighter planes with Rolls-Royce Merlin engines, such as the Hurricane and Spitfire. When the plane went nose-down to begin a dive the resulting negative g-force would flood the engine's SU carburettor, causing the engine to stall. German fighters used fuel injection engines which avoided this problem. So in action a German fighter could evade a pursuing RAF fighter by flying a negative g manoeuvre which the RAF plane could not follow.

Shilling devised a restrictor to solve this problem, originally a brass thimble with a hole in the middle and later further simplified to a flat washer of very precise dimensions. This could be welded into the engine's fuel line without taking the aircraft out of service and limited maximum fuel flow to prevent flooding. By March 1941 she had led a small team on a tour of RAF fighter stations (Shilling travelling on her former racing motorbike), to fit the device to their Merlin engines. The restrictor was immensely popular with pilots and the device was nicknamed Miss Shilling's orifice (though Shilling had married she retained her maiden name for professional purposes) by Sir Stanley Hooker, the engineer who led supercharger development at Rolls-Royce at the time. It continued in use as a stop-gap until the introduction of the pressure carburettor in 1943. Shilling also designed the RAE Hobson pressure carburettor, though this was never produced.

=== Post-Second World War ===
After the war, Shilling worked on a variety of projects including the Blue Streak missile and the effect of a wet runway upon braking. Shilling also helped design and build a bobsled for the Royal Air Force Olympic team.

Shilling worked for the RAE until her retirement in 1969, working as an engineer in the Mechanical Engineering Department. Despite becoming an Officer of the Order of the British Empire in 1949, Shilling never reached a top post in the RAE, since such promotions were only offered to men.

== Motorsport ==
Beatrice Shilling with her Norton motorbike

In the 1930s, Shilling raced motorbikes. After winning a race at the Brooklands racetrack on a motorcycle she modified herself, in a job interview she encountered the sexist comment of "I suppose the men let you win" from the interviewer. On 24 August 1934 she lapped the Brooklands circuit at over 100 miles per hour, with an average speed of 101.85 mph (163.91 km/h) on her Norton M30. She was only the second woman to achieve this, the first being Florence Blenkiron earlier the same year. Both were awarded the British Motorcycle Racing Club's Gold Star award.

After the Second World War Beatrice and husband George turned to racing cars, which were tuned and modified extensively in their home workshop – starting off their exploits with a much-lightened 1934 Lagonda Rapier registered KG 5363. Between 1959 and 1962 they raced an Austin-Healey Sebring Sprite 888 HPA, most frequently at Goodwood Members' Meetings, scoring a number of third places and even one race win.

Beatrice's and George's driving ambitions became more serious with the 1961 acquisition of an Elva 200 Formula Junior single-seater, but there were accidents for both of them, and the Elva was converted into a Mk VI sports car.

In 1967 Shilling was brought in to help US Formula 1 driver and team owner Dan Gurney solve an overheating problem with his Eagle Mk1 F1 racing car.

== Recognition and discrimination ==
Shilling was awarded an honour as an Officer (OBE) of the Order of the British Empire by King George VI in 1949. It was awarded in her married name, Mrs Naylor, which she rarely used.

In 1956, Shilling joined the Institution of Mechanical Engineers under her married name of Naylor, and was elected as an Associate Member, enabling her to use the letters CEng (for Chartered Engineer) after her name. In her application she outlined her contribution to the R.A.E. restrictor.

Shilling held an honorary doctorate from the University of Surrey awarded in 1969. She was a member of the Women's Engineering Society, which she joined as a teenager.

Shilling encountered various forms of discrimination throughout her career, including an RAE chief engineer who did not allow women to enter the building, a law prohibiting women from working at night, and a ban on women entering the RAE Senior Mess (club and dining hall). In a 2011 review of her biography, reviewer Graham White noted that while sexism undoubtedly did hold a large influence over her frustrations, he agreed with a previous author's assertion that her not conforming to professional dress standards that would be expected of a white collar professional in Britain at this time likely did hurt her chances of advancement as "in fact she looked pretty awful" and "she looked like a frumpy old British housewife". The nickname 'Tilly' was never used to her face and referred slightingly to her utilitarian appearance.

== Personal life ==
Shilling married George Naylor, who also worked at the RAE, in September 1938. According to anecdote, she declined to marry him until he also had been awarded the Brooklands Gold Star for lapping the circuit on a motorcycle at over 100 mph. During the Second World War he was a bomber pilot with No. 625 Squadron RAF, and was awarded the Distinguished Flying Cross (DFC). He volunteered for an extra tour of bombing missions beyond what was expected of him. He suffered tinnitus and other health problems in later life as a result of his wartime activities.

== Legacy ==
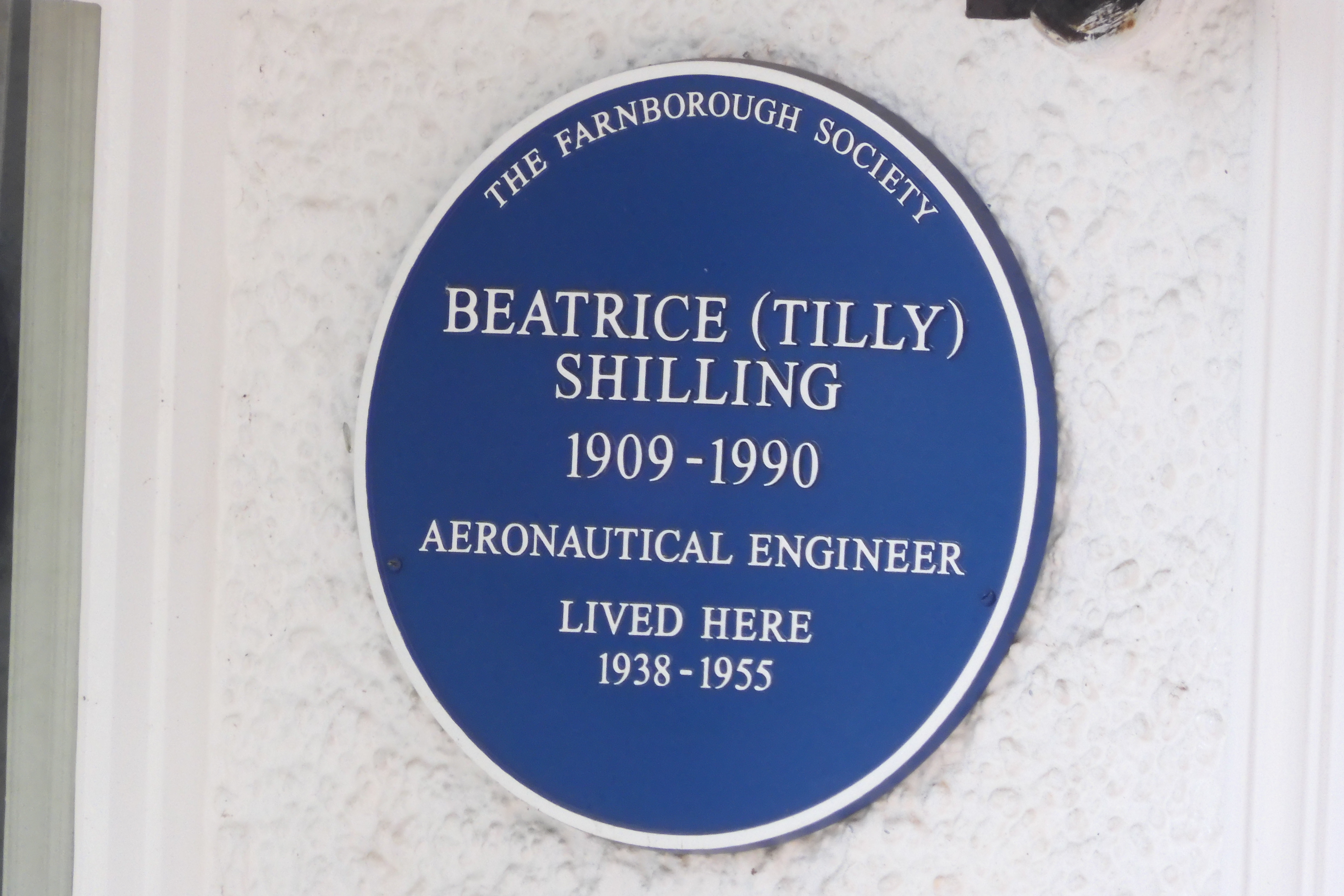
A blue plaque commemorating Shilling

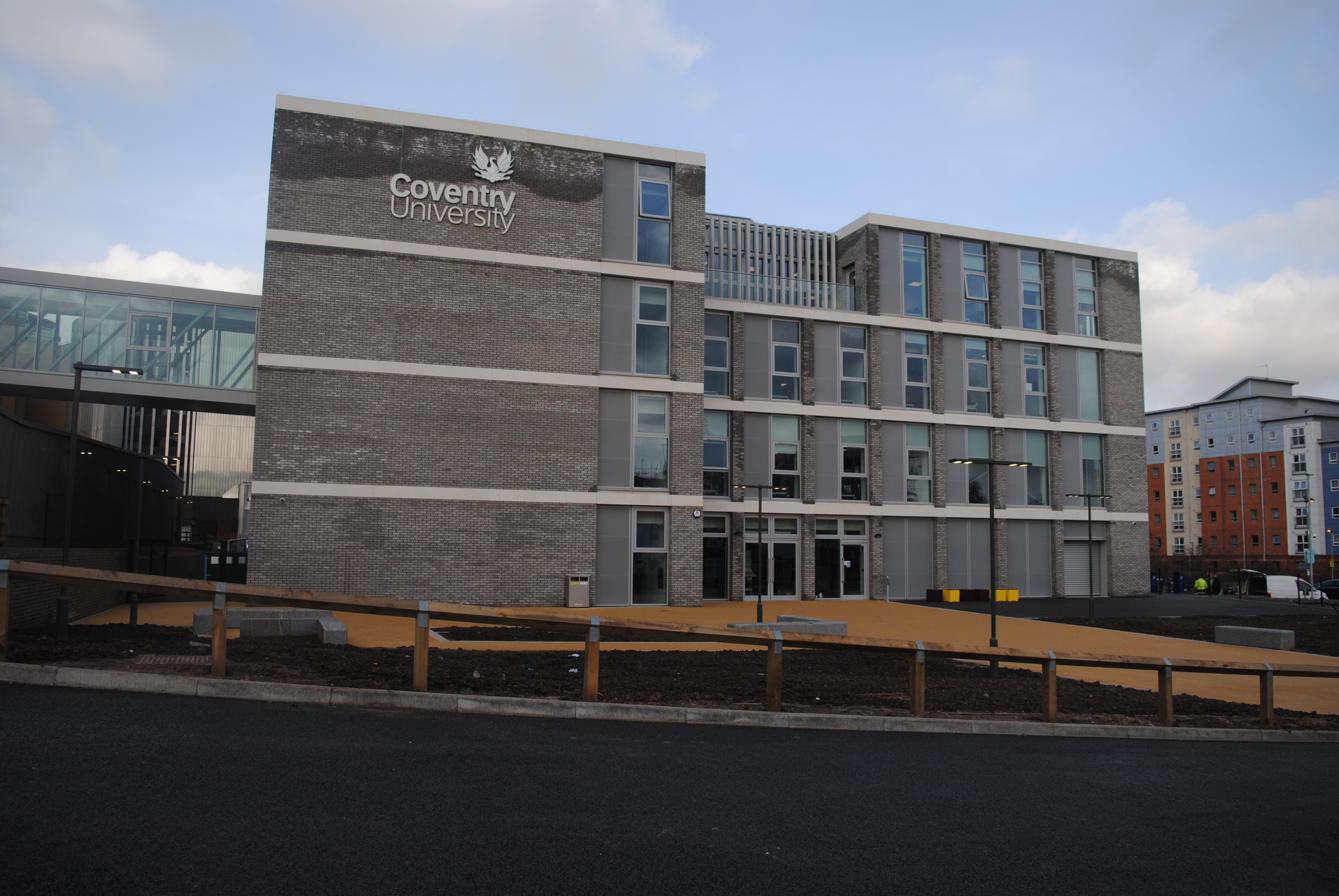
Coventry University's Beatrice Shilling Building

A pub in Farnborough was named The Tilly Shilling after her in 2011.

In 2015, a collection of her racing badges and trophies was bought by the Brooklands Museum.

In September 2018, Shilling was included in Winchester Heritage Open Days 'Extraordinary Women of Hampshire' exhibition, which celebrated notable Hampshire women, past and present. On the 110th anniversary of Shilling's birth, 8 March 2019, the Mayor of Waterlooville unveiled a plaque at Waterlooville Library to commemorate her achievements.

On 27 March 2019, Royal Holloway University opened the Beatrice Shilling Building, home to its new department of Electronic Engineering.

On 9 March 2020 – the day after Beatrice's birthday and International Women's Day – the Mayor of Havant, Councillor Diana Patrick, unveiled a memorial plaque to Shilling at Shilling Place, a retirement home in Waterlooville.

Shilling's biography was published by the Oxford Dictionary of National Biography on 9 May 2019 as part of their support for the Women's Engineering Society's centenary.

Tilly and The Spitfires, a one-act play written by Rachel O'Neill, dealing with aspects of Shilling's personal and professional lives, was staged at The Discovery Centre (now The Arc) in Winchester in September 2019.

Coventry University's Beatrice Shilling building opened on the city centre campus in autumn 2020.

Her alma mater, the University of Manchester, offers a Beatrice Shilling Scholarship to undergraduates.

== Bibliography ==
- Lumsden, Alec. British Piston Engines and their Aircraft. Marlborough, Wiltshire: Airlife Publishing, 2003. ISBN 1-85310-294-6.
- Freudenberg, Matthew (2003). Negative Gravity, the Life of Beatrice Shilling. Charlton Publications. ISBN 0-9546165-0-2.
