= Panther Model 120 =

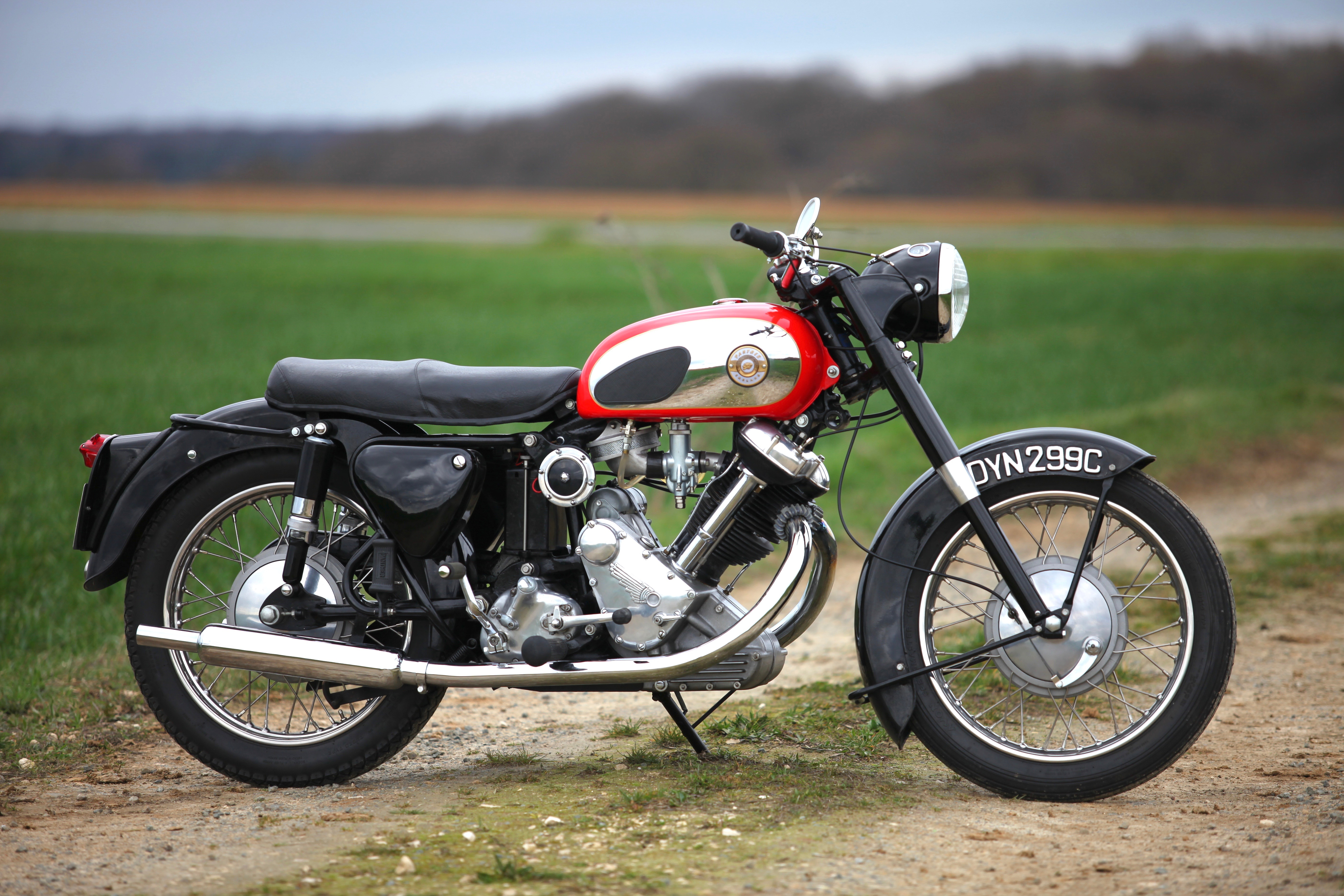
- Manufacturer: Phelon & Moore
- Production: 1959–1965
- Predecessor: Model 100
- Engine: 645 cc (39.4 cu in). air cooled, single cylinder, overhead valve, pushrod four stroke
- Bore / stroke: 88 mm × 106 mm (3.5 in × 4.2 in)
- Power: 27 bhp (20 kW) at 4,500 rpm
- Transmission: Burman Four speed. Multi-plate clutch in oil
- Brakes: 8 inch front drum 7 inch rear drum
- Tires: Front tyre 3.25 x 19 inch Rear tyre 3.50 x 19 inch
- Wheelbase: 59 inches (1,500 mm)
- Dimensions: L: 83 inches (2,100 mm)
- Seat height: 28 inches (710 mm)
- Weight: 426 lb (193 kg) (dry)
- Fuel consumption: 55 mpg_{‑imp} (5.1 L/100 km; 46 mpg_{‑US})

The Panther Model 120 is a British motorcycle that was made between 1959 and 1966 by Phelon & Moore. An enlarged Panther Model 100, the 120 had a reputation for being less reliable with a tendency for rapid clutch wear, problematical roller bearings and heavy oil consumption. As competitors produced modern designs, Panther ran into trouble obtaining supplies of Burman gearboxes and Lucas magdynos. Production ceased in 1966, and the company was wound up.

== Development ==
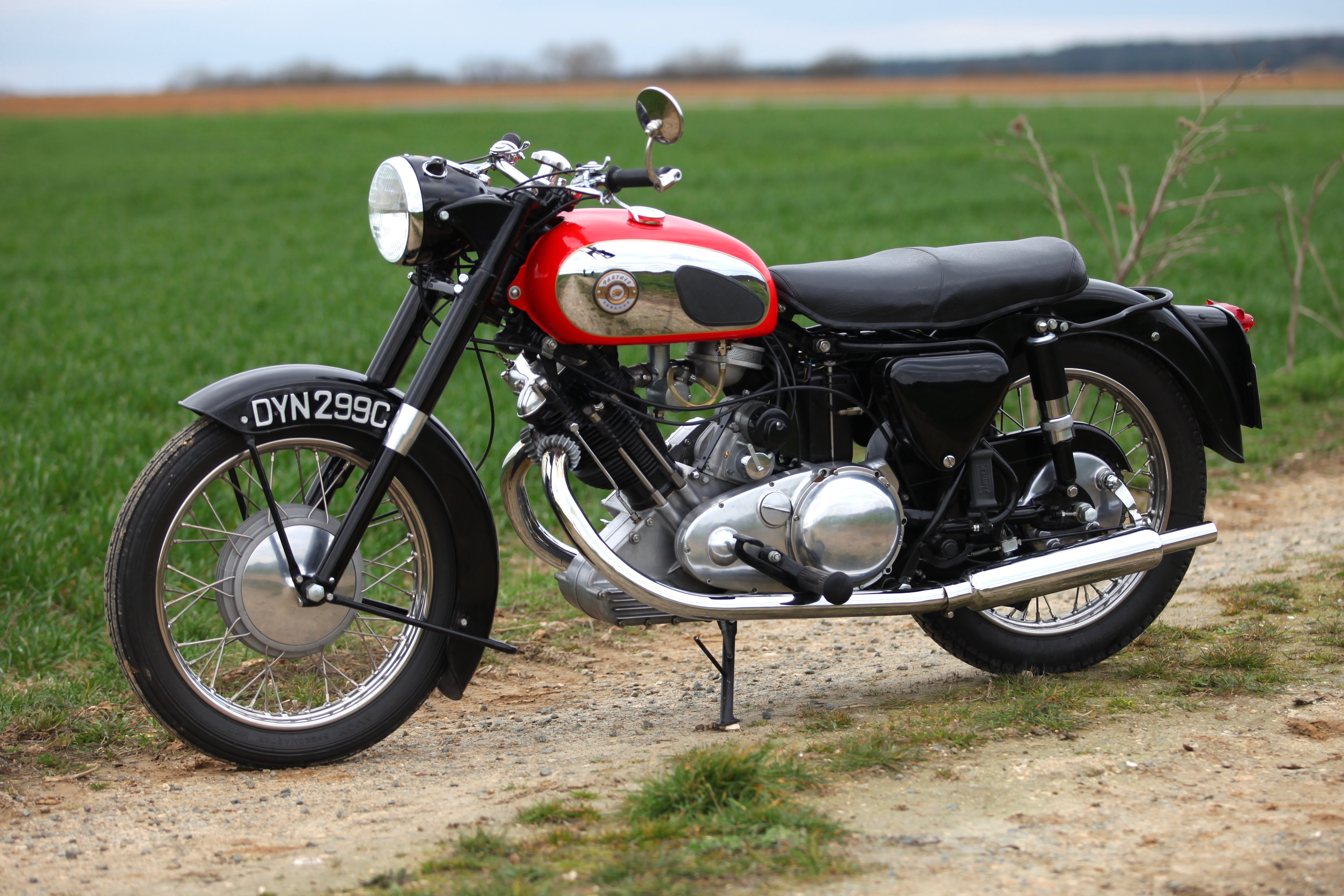
Model 120

The Panther "sloper" engine designed by Granville Bradshaw remained unchanged for 25 years, and the 650 cc "heavyweight" shared many of the Model 100's components. The increased capacity was achieved by boring out the Model 100 cylinder by 1 mm and increasing the stroke by 6 mm. As well as increased low speed torque, this improved acceleration and top end cruising speed.

This put additional strain on the main bearings and crankcases, leading to reliability problems. The 120 also suffered with lubrication problems from the large sump cast into the front of the engine. Oil was pumped to the top of the sloper engine but return was erratic and oil consumption very heavy. The main shaft was redesigned with larger ball journal main bearings, A smaller exhaust valve combined with a larger Amal monobloc carburettor gave the Model 120 28 bhp at 4500 rpm; an increase of 4 bhp over the Model 100.

Motorcycle sidecars were popular at the end of the 1950s, so the Model 120 was provided with a purpose built sidecar chassis, connected by a three-point mounting which provided minimal alignment problems. The front and rear wheels were designed to be interchangeable, and the sidecar chassis wheel was made the same size. The sidecar had swinging arm suspension with an Armstrong shock absorber. A trailer with a towbar was also offered as an option.

== The end ==
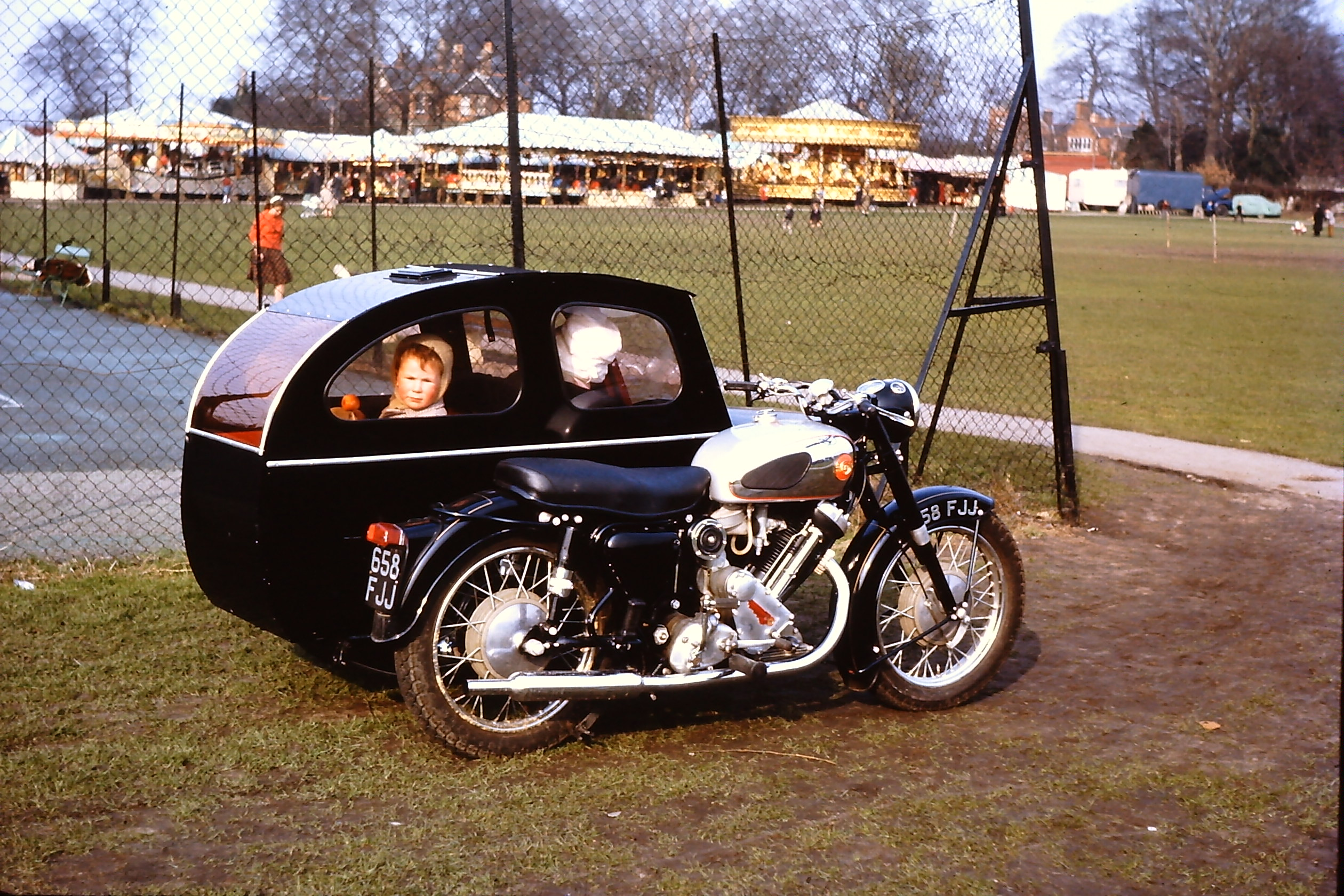
Model 120 with Watsonian double adult sidecar

By 1962 Phelon & Moore was in financial trouble, and went into receivership. The Model 120 stayed in production for as long as the supply of parts lasted, but they finally ran out in 1966, and the company ceased production. It wasn't quite the end for the big Panther, however, as they were cheap and economical and continued to sell for another year after production ended. Panther Model 120's are still being maintained and used regularly to this day by enthusiasts.

== See also ==
- Panther Model 100
- List of motorcycles of the 1950s
