= Updraft carburetor =

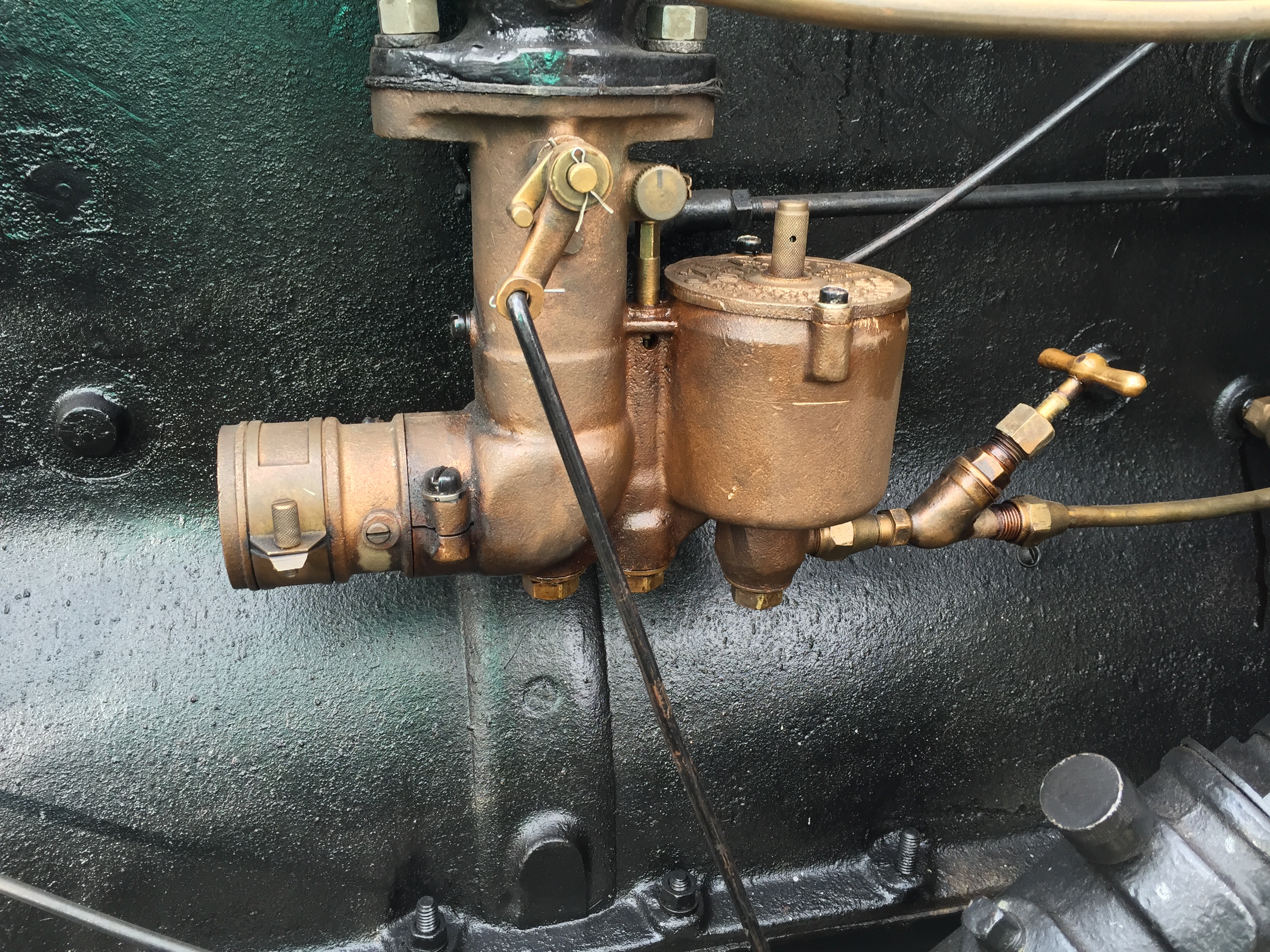
Updraft carburettor fitted to the engine of a 1923 Nash automobile

An updraft carburetor is a type of carburetor in which the air flows upward within the device. Other types are downdraft and sidedraft.

An updraft carburetor was the first type in common use. In it air flows upward into the venturi to mix with the fuel. An updraft carburetor may need a drip collector.

== See also ==
- Pressure carburetor
- Fuel injection
