= Pressure carburetor =

Type of fuel metering system for piston aircraft engines

A pressure carburetor is a type of fuel metering system manufactured by the Bendix Corporation for piston aircraft engines, starting in the 1940s. It is recognized as an early type of throttle-body fuel injection and was developed to prevent fuel starvation during inverted flight.

== Concept ==
Most aircraft of the 1920s and 1930s had a float-type carburetor. They are adequate for civil aircraft which normally fly upright, but present a problem for aircraft which fly upside-down or are subject to a negative g-force, especially military fighters and aerobatic aircraft. A float carburetor uses the venturi effect to supply fuel into the engine intake; this depends upon a constant level of fuel in the float bowl to maintain the desired fuel/air mixture. The float operates a valve which keeps the fuel level in the carburetor consistent despite varying demands by means of a linked float valve. As the fuel level increases, the valve closes slowing or stopping the flow into the bowl. However, since the float depends on gravity to function, it is ineffective when the aircraft is inverted. During inversion, fuel is delivered to the float bowl as fast as the fuel pump is capable resulting in an extremely rich mixture stopping the engine almost instantly.

The problem was keenly felt by the RAF during the first years of World War II, because the Rolls-Royce Merlin engines fitted to Hurricanes and Spitfires suffered from the problem, unlike the direct fuel injection engines of their German counterparts. It was largely solved by installing a flow-restricting washer that allowed just enough fuel into the carburetor for the engine to develop maximum power (the R.A.E. restrictor was known as "Miss Shilling's orifice"). However, it was only a stopgap solution.

The pressure carburetor solved the problem. It operates on pressure alone, meaning that gravity no longer has any effect. For that reason, the pressure carburetor operates reliably when the plane is in any flight attitude. The fact that a pressure carburetor operates on the principle of fuel under positive pressure makes it a form of fuel injection.

== Construction ==
Like a float carburetor, a pressure carburetor has a barrel with a venturi inside it through which air flows on its way to the engine cylinders. However, it does not have a float to control the flow of fuel into the carburetor. Instead, it has four chambers in a row separated by flexible diaphragms. The diaphragms are attached concentrically to a shaft which operates a wedge-shaped servo valve. This valve controls the rate at which fuel can enter the pressure carburetor. Inside the barrel, downstream of the throttle sits the discharge valve, which is a spring-loaded valve operated by fuel pressure that controls the rate that fuel is discharged into the barrel.

Some pressure carburetors had many auxiliary systems. The designs grew in complexity with the bigger models used on bigger engines. Many have an accelerator pump, an automatic mixture control, and models on turbocharged engines feature a temperature compensator. The result is that pressure carbureted engines are fairly simple to operate compared to float carbureted engines.

== Operation ==
Schematic of a pressure carburetor.

The four chambers in the pressure carburetor are all in a row and are referred to by letters. Chamber A contains impact air pressure at the carburetor inlet. Chamber B contains the lower air pressure from the throat of the venturi. The difference in pressure between the two air chambers creates what is known as the air metering force, which acts to open the servo valve. Chamber C contains metered fuel, and chamber D contains unmetered fuel. The difference in pressure between the two fuel chambers creates the fuel metering force, which acts to close the servo valve. Since the fuel pressures are naturally higher than air pressure, chamber A contains a spring which makes up the difference in force to create a balance.

When the engine starts and air begins to flow through the venturi, the pressure in the venturi drops according to Bernoulli's principle. This causes the pressure in chamber B to drop. At the same time, air entering the carburetor compresses the air in the impact tubes, generating a positive pressure based on the density and speed of the air as it enters. The difference in pressure between chamber A and chamber B creates the air metering force which opens the servo valve and allows fuel in. Chamber C and chamber D are connected by a fuel passage which contains the fuel metering jets. As fuel begins to flow, the pressure drop across the metering jet creates the fuel metering force which acts to close the servo valve until a balance is reached with the air pressure and the spring.

From chamber C the fuel flows to the discharge valve. The discharge valve acts as a variable restriction which holds the pressure in chamber C constant despite varying fuel flow rates.

The fuel mixture is automatically altitude-controlled by bleeding higher pressure air from chamber A to the chamber B as it flows through a tapered needle valve. The needle valve is controlled by an aneroid bellows, causing a leaning of the mixture as altitude increases.

The fuel mixture is manually controlled by a fuel mixture control lever in the cockpit. The cockpit lever has either three or four detent positions that causes a cloverleaf shaped plate to rotate in the mixture control chamber. The plate covers or uncovers the fuel metering jets as the mixture control lever is moved as follows:

1. Idle-cutoff position, where all fuel flow is cut off from the metered side of the fuel chamber, thereby closing the servo valve, stopping the engine.
2. Auto-Lean position, where fuel flows through the enrichment and lean fuel metering jets. This is sometimes called the cruise position, as this is the most-used position while in flight.
3. Auto-rich position, where the fuel flows through the rich, enrichment and lean fuel metering jets. This position is used for takeoff and landing.
4. War Emergency position (military carburetors only), where fuel flows through the lean and rich fuel metering jets only, but only when there is pressure in the Anti-detonation injection (ADI) system.

The ADI (anti-detonant injection) system, an adjunct to the pressure carburetor found on large military piston engines, consists of a supply tank for the ADI liquid (a mixture of 50% methanol, 49% water and 1% oil), a pressure pump, a pressure regulator, a spray nozzle, and a control diaphragm that moves the carburetor enrichment valve closed when pressure is present.

The ADI system adds cooling water to the fuel-air mixture to prevent pre-ignition (detonation) in the engine cylinders when the mixture is leaned to a more powerful––yet engine damaging––mixture that adds considerable power to the engine. The supply of ADI liquid is limited so that the system runs out of liquid before the engine is damaged by the very high cylinder head temperatures caused by the very lean mixture.

== Applications ==
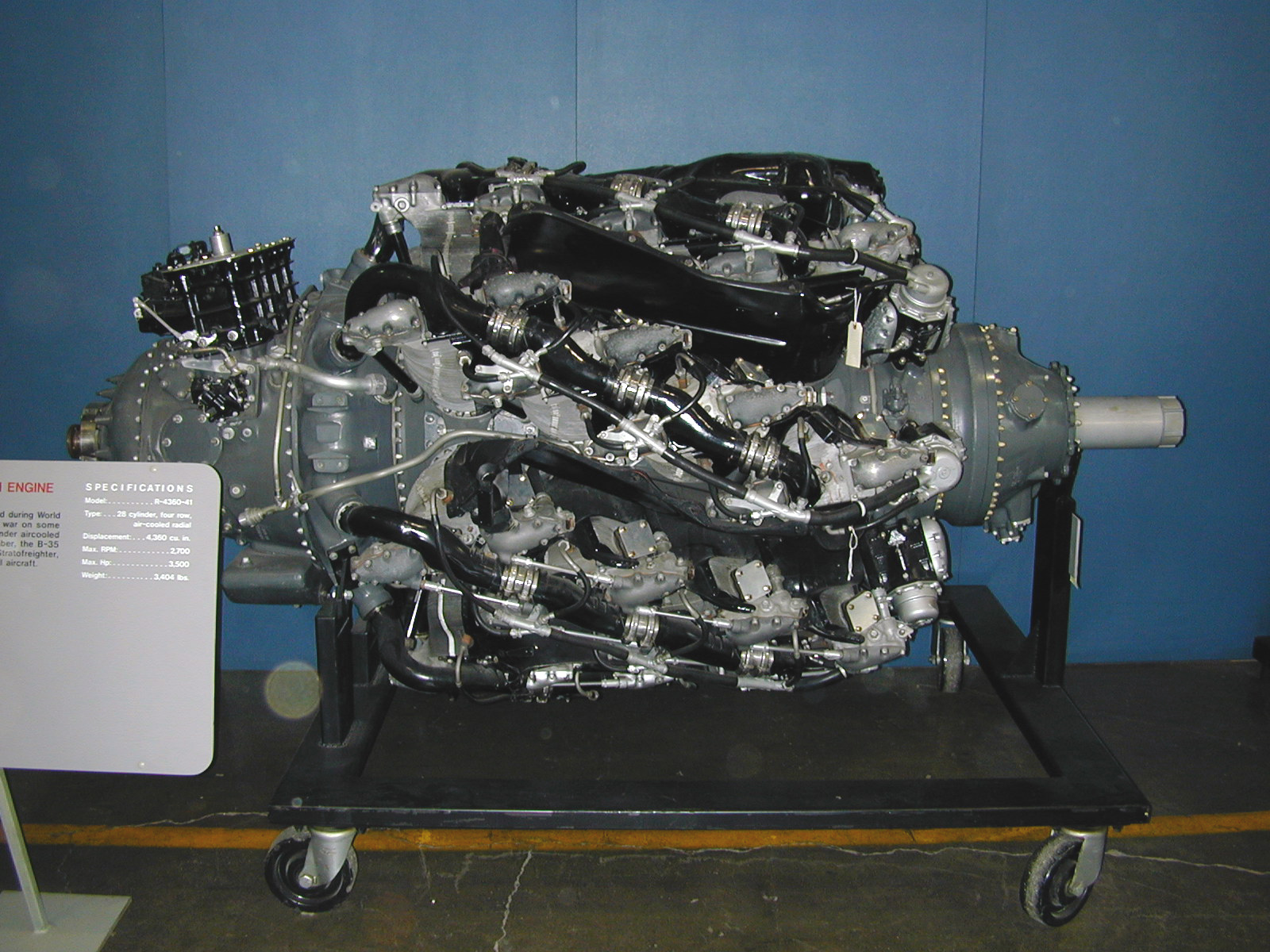
Pratt & Whitney R-4360 Wasp Major. The pressure carburetor is the black box on top of the crankcase at the rear of the engine.

Pressure carburetors were used on many piston engines of 1940s vintage used in World War II aircraft. They went from being a new design early in the war to being standard equipment on nearly every allied aircraft engine by the war's end. The largest pressure carburetors were the Bendix PR-100 series which were used on the Pratt & Whitney R-4360, the largest piston aircraft engine to see production.

After the war, Bendix made the smaller PS series which was found on Lycoming and Continental engines on general aviation aircraft. These small pressure carburetors eventually evolved into the Bendix RSA series multi-point continuous-flow fuel injection system which is still sold on new aircraft. The RSA injection system sprays fuel into the ports just outside the intake valves in each cylinder, thus eliminating the chilling effect of evaporating fuel as a source of carburetor ice—since the temperature in the intake ports is too high for ice to form.

== See also ==
- Updraft carburetor
- Bendix-Stromberg pressure carburetor
