= Sheila McGuffie =

British aeronautical engineer (1911–2007)

Sheila Anscombe (née McGuffie)
- Born: Sheila Emmet McGuffie; 14 December 1911; Macclesfield, Cheshire, England
- Died: 2007
- Education: Victoria University of Manchester (B.Sc. Electrical Engineering)
- Occupation: Engineer
- Employers: A.C. Engineers; Royal Aircraft Establishment; Power Jets
- Organizations: Royal Aeronautical Society Women's Engineering Society
- Notable work: Worked on first jet engine

Sheila McGuffie later Sheila Anscombe (14 December 1911 - 2007) was an aeronautical engineer, who was part of the team that developed the first jet engine.

== Early life and education ==
Sheila Emmet McGuffie was born on 14 December 1911 in Whaley Bridge, Derbyshire to Evelyn Maud (née Emmett) and John Carruthers McGuffie, one of five children. She studied Electrical Engineering at the Victoria University of Manchester and graduated in 1932 with an honours degree. She was one of two women to graduate from the department at the same time, the other being Beatrice Shilling. In an article written by McGuffie in the Glasgow Herald in 1950, she recalled that only four women took degrees in engineering in the UK in the year she graduated, which was a record number. In the same article she recalled riding pillion on Shillings' motor bike over Manchester's cobbled streets.

== Career ==
McGuffie found it difficult to obtain employment after graduating and started her career as an apprentice in electrical contracting and house wiring, about which she later wrote an article in The Woman Engineer. She subsequently spent three years as a test records engineer at A.C Engineers, Rugby and then from 1936 worked as a wind tunnel scientist at the Royal Aircraft Establishment, Farnborough.

She gained her pilot's A licence (No. 14060) while working there, on 17 July 1936 flying a Pobjoy aircraft at Coventry Aeroplane Club. She was the first woman member and the tenth pupil of the Coventry Aviation Group to fly solo. McGuffie married Leonard Douglas Anscombe, an electrical designer and fellow pilot in the Coventry club in June 1938 at Chapel en le Frith, where her parents had settled. She kept flying as a member of the Civil Air Guard.

Now known as Sheila Anscombe, she worked as a test engineer at Power Jets from 1940 to 1942 with Frank Whittle's team developing the first jet engine, and she was present at the first flight at Cranwell in May 1941.

During the Second World War McGuffie also worked as an ambulance driver.

== Professional memberships ==
- Royal Aeronautical Society (student/full member)
- Women's Engineering Society (member)
