= Phelon & Moore =

British motorcycle manufacturer (1904–1967)

- Industry: Motorcycles
- Founded: 1904
- Defunct: 1967
- Fate: Acquired, ultimately, by IMI plc
- Headquarters: Cleckheaton, Yorkshire, UK
- Products: Panther marque

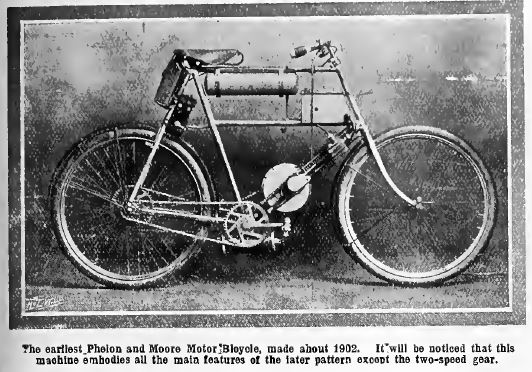
Phelon motorcycle, c. 1902

Phelon & Moore manufactured motorcycles in Cleckheaton, Yorkshire, England from 1904 to 1967, particularly those under the Panther marque. They became identified with a design of motorcycle which had a large sloping 40-degree single-cylinder engine as a stressed member of the frame. This design spanned the entire history of the company, starting with a 500 cc model and ending with a 645 cc model.

== Precursor ==
The sloping stressed member concept was patented in 1901 by Joah ("John") Carver Phelon and his nephew Harry Rayner (Patent GB190103516). Phelon & Rayner made the first chain-driven motorcycle in 1900. The Phelon & Rayner 1.75 hp machines were only in production until 1903, but they also licensed the design to Humber Limited, who produced motorcycles based on it from 1902 until 1906. After Harry Rayner died in a car accident, Joah Phelon went into partnership with Richard Moore.

== P&M motorcycles ==
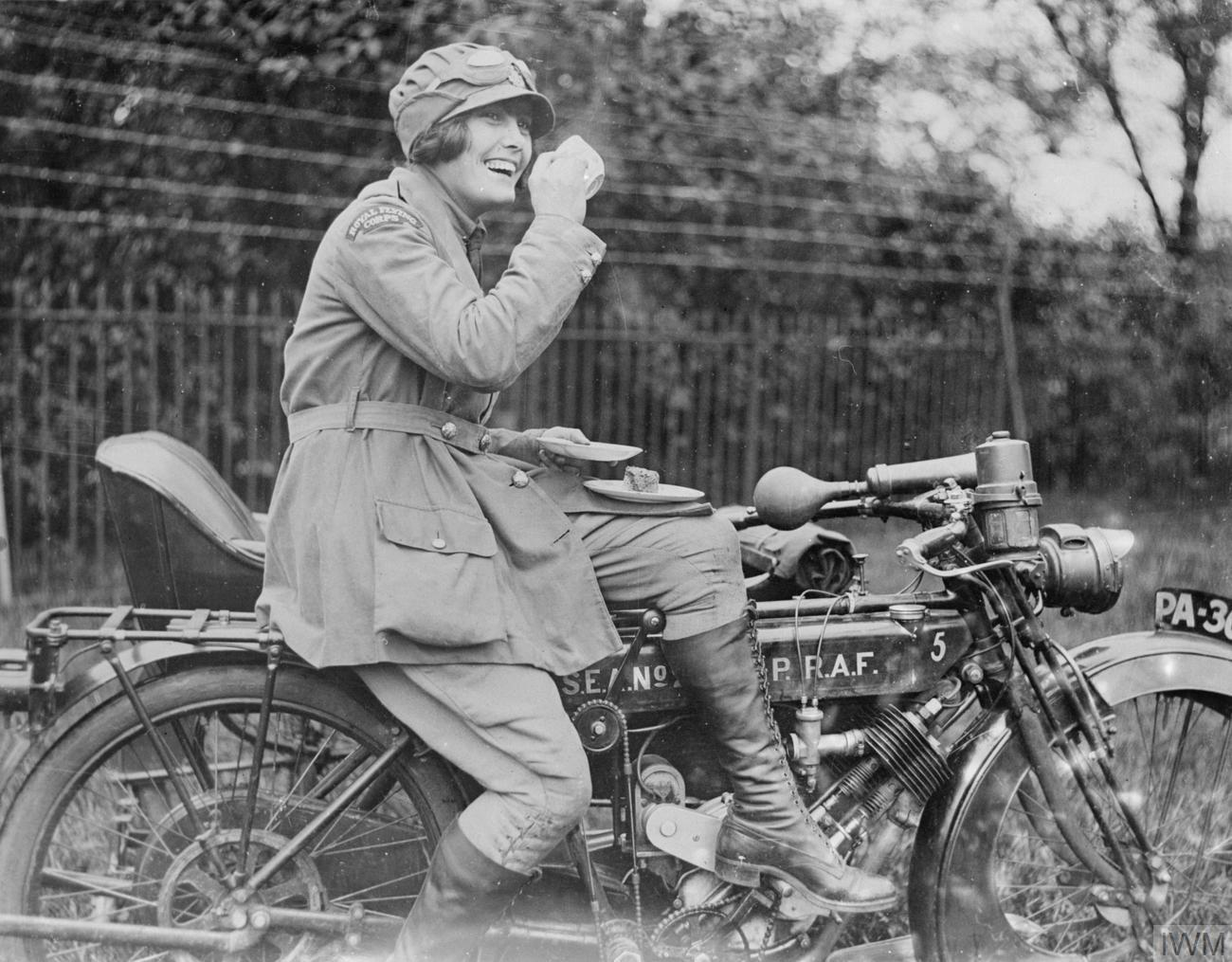
A Women's Royal Air Force (WRAF) despatch rider on a tea break, seated on her P&M 500 cc single, 1918

Phelon & Moore was established in 1904, and their motorcycles were branded as P&M. The 1905 P&M featured an inclined single cylinder 4-stroke engine as a stressed member in the frame with 2-speed gear and chain drive to the rear wheel, it being the 'first completely chain driven motor cycle'. P&M motorcycles competed in the first International Six Days Trial (ISDT) in 1913 (now called the International Six Days Enduro). Three P&M motorcycles competed in the 1914 ACU six days trial, all 3.5 hp solo models (of 498 cc).

In July 1914 P&M revealed details of their prototype 90 degree V-twin, their first deviation from the single cylinder motor cycles for which they were known. When the V-twin was launched in November 1914 it featured a four-speed gear, and was of 770cc, rated as 6 hp. It appears only a handful of the twin were built, though it appeared in catalogues until 1916. The four-speed gear arrangement used on the V-twins was re-introduced for the single in 1922, and at the same time the engine capacity was increased from 499 cc to 555 cc. This was the last model to carry the P&M name, later models being branded as Panther.

The Royal Flying Corps used P&M motorcycles during the First World War, keeping P&M busy throughout the conflict. P&M were also selected as the suppliers when the Royal Armoured Corps added sidecars to their range of vehicles in 1922.

== Panther motorcycles ==
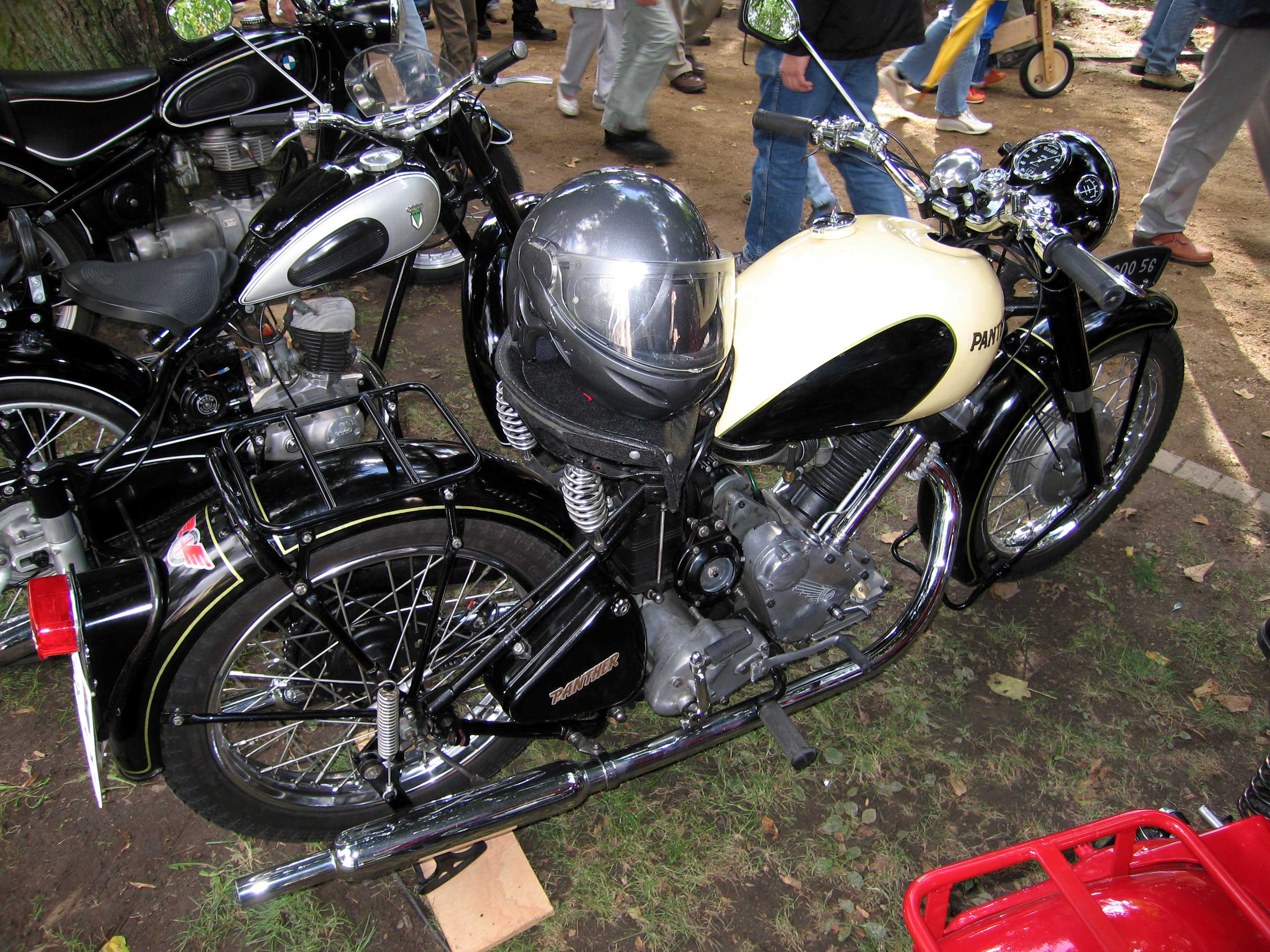
Panther motorcycle

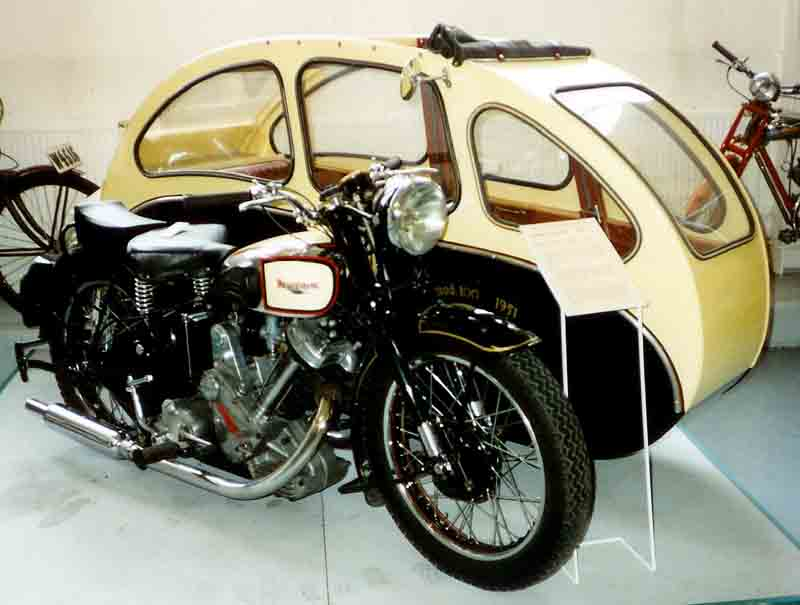
Panther 100, 1951

The first Panther was launched in 1924, but the Phelon & Moore name was not dropped until somewhere around 1929.

In 1932 the Panther Model 100, an OHV 600 cc single, was launched. This was produced through to the sixties, ending its run as the 645 cc Panther Model 120 of 1967. This line of Panthers was the most famous of all Phelon & Moore models.

These heavyweight big single-cylinder "slopers" were often described as "firing once every lamp-post" due to their low rpm. Promoted as "The Perfected Motorcycle" they were noted for innovation for most of their history. Panthers were often used for hauling sidecars, a role in which the high torque output of a high capacity single-cylinder engine with its large flywheels was well suited, but the popularity of sidecar outfits eventually waned.

The combination of the advent of cheap cars and the collapse of the British motorcycle industry brought production to an end. They are simple and fairly robust machines which inspire enthusiasm in their owners. These factors, combined with relatively low cost, have resulted in a fair number of Panthers being still in use.

Phelon & Moore also produced a range of lightweight machines, also generally carrying the name Panther or Red Panther, using their own four-stroke single engines and Villiers two-stroke engines. The Red Panther was known for being the cheapest complete bike available in the thirties, priced at a fraction under £30. In 1934 a 250 cc Red Panther won the Maudes Trophy.

The early postwar models (both Lightweight and Heavyweight) were fitted with air/oil damped Dowty "Oleomatic" telescopic forks.

During the scooter boom of the late 1950s, P & M imported a scooter (Scooterrot) and moped from French manufacturer Terrot, which were plagued with troubles. This gave P & M the chance to develop their own scooter, the Panther Princess, but it was not a success and helped bring about the demise of P & M as motorcycle manufacturers. In 1962 the receiver was called in, and production staggered on until 1966.

== List of models ==
=== "Heavyweight" ===
Phelon & Rayner

- 1.75 hp Phelon & Rayner (1901–1903)

Humber

- 1.5/1.7 hp Humber (1901–1903)
- 2.75 hp Humber Olympia (1902–1905)
- 4.5 hp Humber Olympia (1905)

Phelon & Moore

- 2.75 hp (1904–1906)
- 3.5 hp (1904–1907)

First real heavyweight 412 cc

- 3.5 hp Forecar (1904)
- 3.5 hp Standard (1908–1914)

465 cc (1908–1912)
499 cc (1913 – 1914 & 1920 1922)

- 3.5 hp Colonial (1911–1914)

Heavier duty version

- 3.5 hp RFC/RAF Model (1914–1921)

military version produced during First World War

- 4.5 hp Model A (1922–1925)

555 cc, two speed gearbox and two speed primary with combination foot and hand gear change giving four gears.

Phelon & Moore race bikes

- TT Entrant (1925–1926, 1928)
- TT Replica (1926–1928)
- Cinder Track (1928)

185 lb dirt tracker

Panther

- Panther (1924–1929)
- Panther Standard (1927)
- Panther Cub (1927)

Stripped down version of Standard

- Panther Model 1 (1928)

Introduction of Model numbers

- Panther Model 1a (1928)

Twin exhaust port model

- Panther Model 2 Standard (1928)
- Panther Model 3 (1928)

598 cc

- Panther Model 60 (1929–1935)

A renamed Model 3 and subsequently the origin of the Model 100

- Panther Model 85 (1929–1930)

598 cc

- Panther Model 50 (1930–1935)

498 cc

- Panther Model 55 (1931–1935)

498 cc

- Panther Model 55

490 cc

- Panther Model 90 Redwing (1931–1938)

490 cc

- Panther Model 70 Express (1932)
- Panther Model 100 (1932–1963)

598 cc

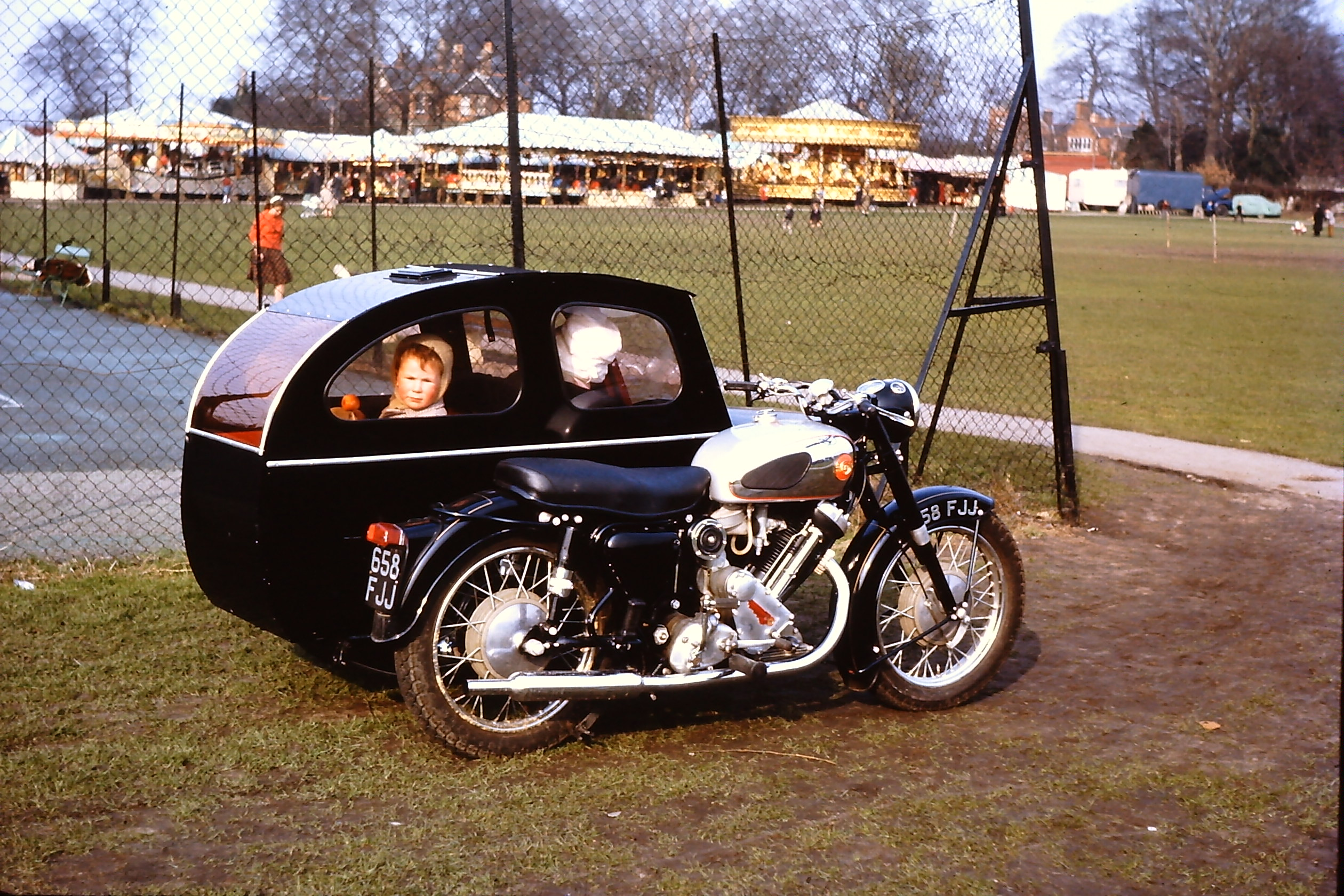
Panther M120 with Watsonian double adult sidecar

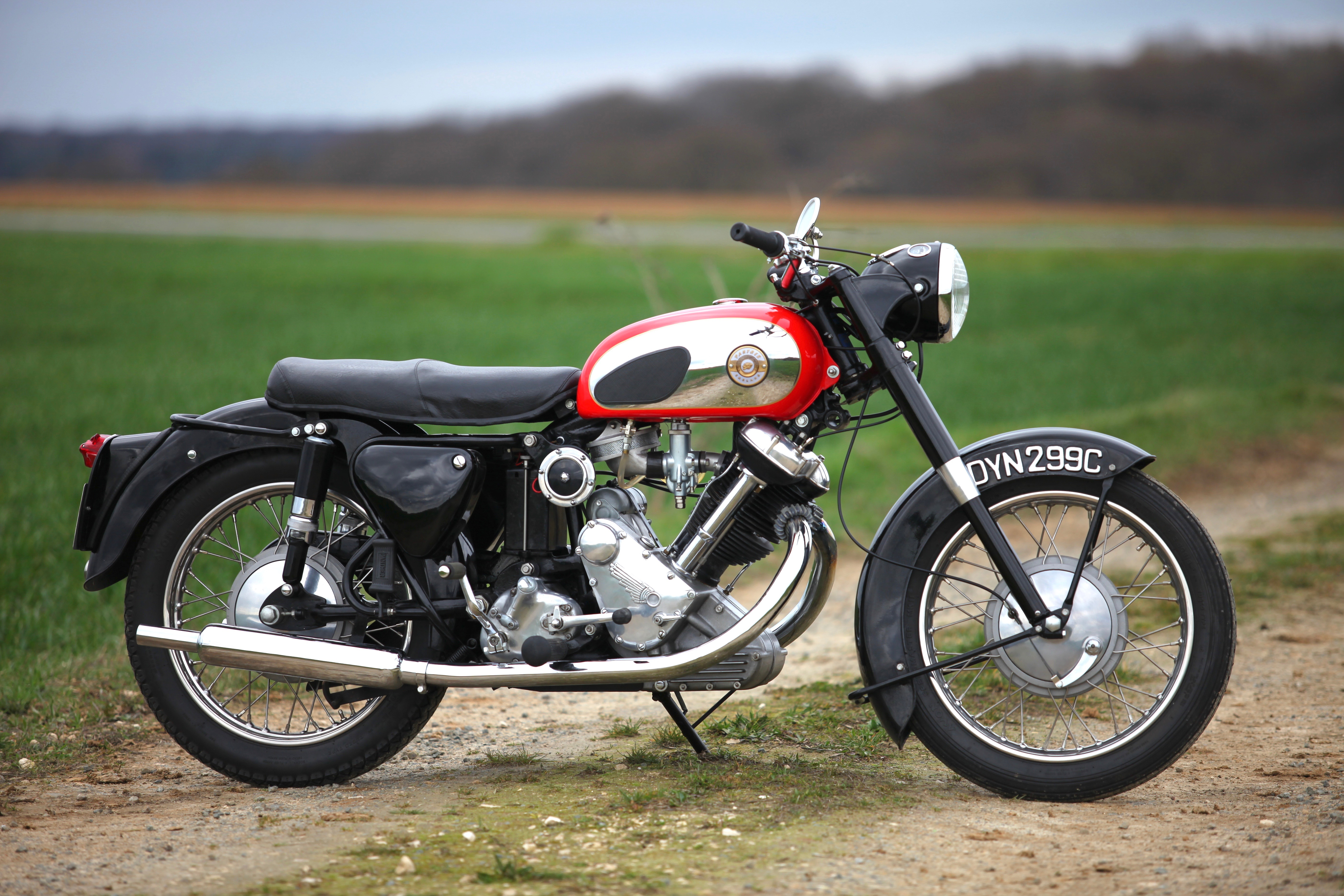
Panther M120 (right side)

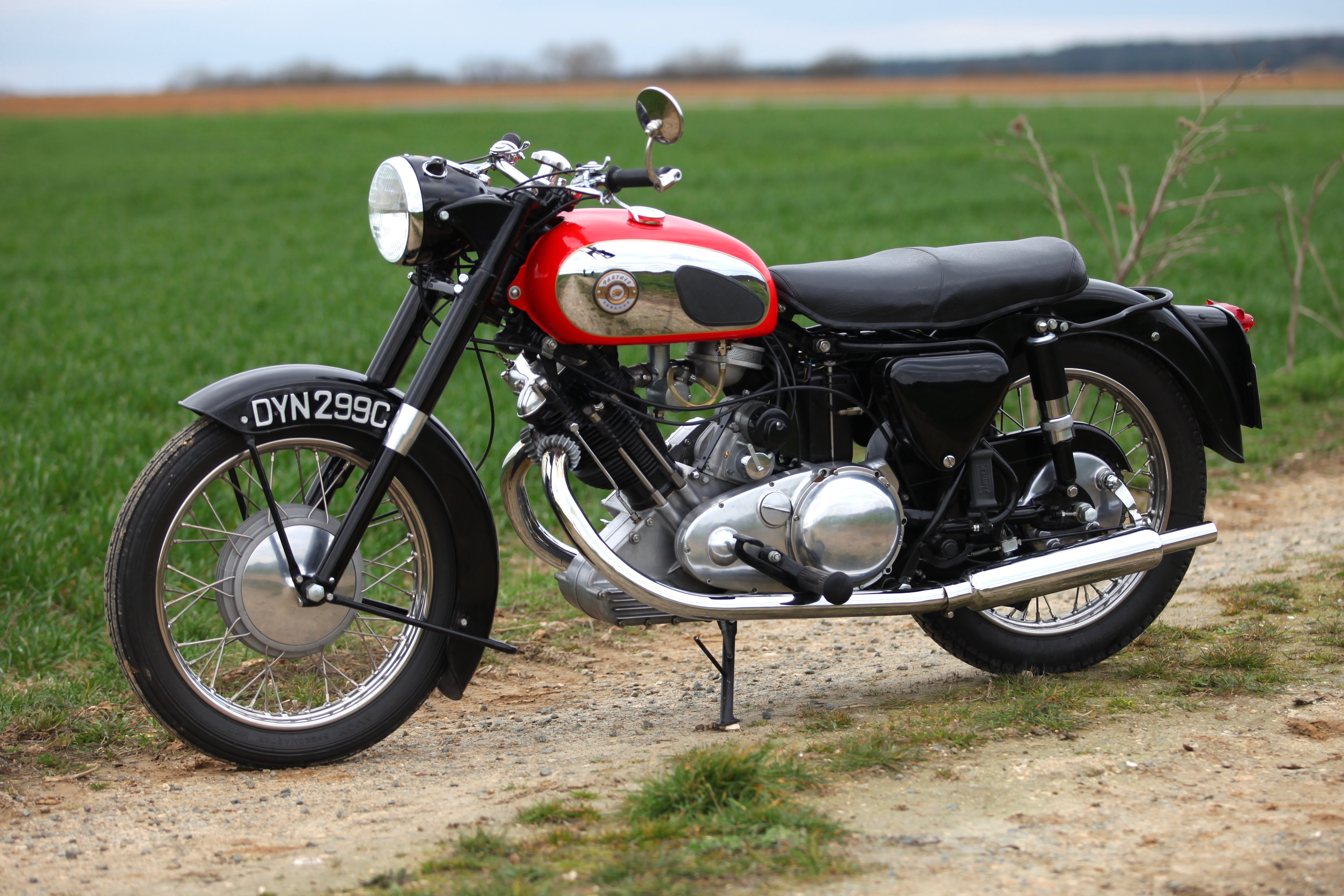
Panther M120 (left side)

- Panther Model 95 (1938–1939)

Vertical engine – low production numbers
500 cc

- Panther Model 120 (1959–1966)

645 cc, effectively an enlarged Model 100

=== Four-stroke lightweights ===
- Panther Panthette (1930) (250 cc unit construction transverse V-twin, unsuccessful, only Panther four-stroke twin made, rare)
- Pre-war 250s include:
  - Model 30 (1932)
  - Model 40
  - Model 70 Redwing
  - Red Panther Standard
  - Red Panther Model 20 Deluxe
  - Red Panther Model 20
- Post-war 250s include:
  - Model 60
  - Model 65
  - Model 65 Deluxe

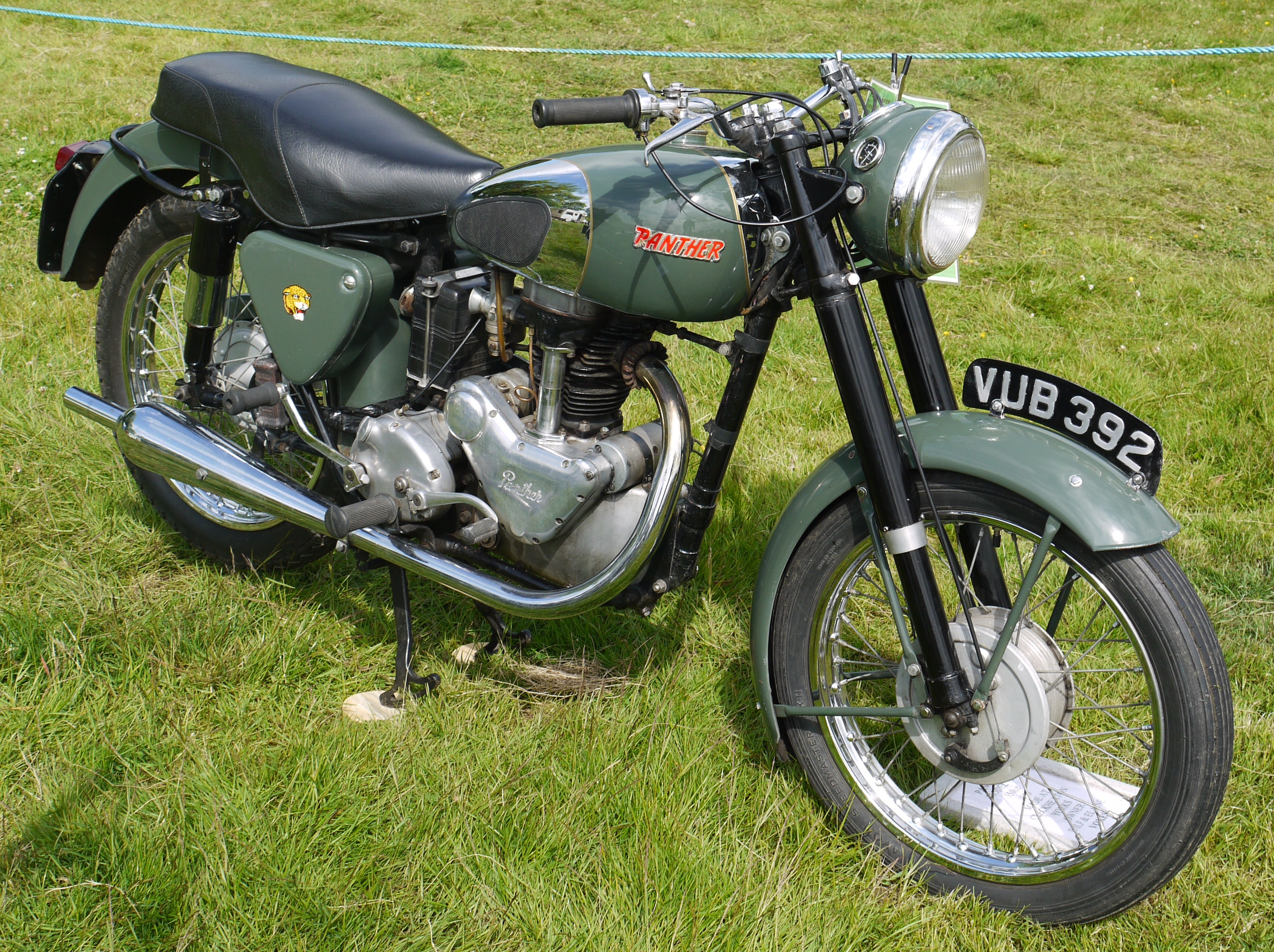
Model 75 350 cc 1954 onwards

- Pre-war 350s include:
  - Model 80 Redwing
  - Redwing 85
  - Red Panther Model 30
- Post-war 350s include:
  - Model 70
  - Model 75 (1949–1962)
  - Model 75 Deluxe

=== Two-stroke lightweights ===
(Villiers motors)

- Model 10/3 (1956–1960) (197 cc single; 3 gears)
- Model 10/4 (1956–1960) (197 cc single; 4 gears)
- Model 45 (1959–1964) (324 cc twin )
- Model 35 (1958 to 1966) (249 cc twin)
