= Burman and Sons =

Burman and Sons Ltd, of Ryland Road, Birmingham, West Midlands, was a company that manufactured Burman-Douglas steering gear.

Their worm and nut design of steering gear was fitted to pre-war vehicles such as the Ford Eight and the Ford Prefect, the Bedford CA, plus heavy trucks and off-road vehicles - both pre and post-war. In its day, Burman-Douglas steering-gear was regarded as "...a 'quality' feature of a car chassis specification," though the worm and nut design was eventually surpassed by the more direct rack and pinion design which dominates today.

The company also manufactured motorcycle gearboxes during part of its history.
