= Isabel Ebel =

American aeronautical engineer

- Ebel in 1934 holding her flying wing prototype plane
- Born: October 4, 1908; Kings County, New York
- Died: November 3, 1992 (aged 84); Santa Barbara, California
- Education: Massachusetts Institute of Technology and NYU
- Occupation: Aeronautical Engineer
- Employer: Grumman et al
- Known for: first qualified woman aero engineer at MIT

Isabel Caroline Ebel, also known as Isabel Caroline Hines (October 4, 1908 – November 3, 1992), was an American who was the first woman student at Massachusetts Institute of Technology and New York University to study aeronautical engineering.

== Early life and education ==
Ebel was born in Kings County, New York on October 4, 1908, daughter of Arthur R. Ebel, Assistant Commissioner of Public Works in Brooklyn.

She was not the first woman involved in aero engineering as one of the Wright Brothers company was Katharine Wright. Katherine was the only person in the Wright family to have a degree but it was not in engineering. Elsie MacGill gained a masters in aeronautical engineering in 1929.

Ebel earned her degree in aeronautical engineering at the Massachusetts Institute of Technology in 1932. She was a member of the Cleofan women's club whilst studying there. Ebel wanted to use her degree but she had difficulty in finding employment in the field. She assisted pilot Amelia Earhart when she was planning one of her record-breaking flights. Ebel decided to undertake further study and applied to the Guggenheim School of Engineering at New York University. It was said that she was only accepted because Earhart interceded with the admission staff on her behalf.

== Career ==
When she qualified in 1934 she was annoyed at the attention she received because she was only being noted for being "a freak". Ebel asked the question "Why wouldn't a girl study aeronautical engineering?", but the reporter for the Brooklyn Daily Eagle did not answer. Her reply was difficulty again in finding a relevant job. In 1937, she was included in an article by M. Elsa Gardner on Women Engineers in the journal of the Women's Engineering Society, alongside Kate Gleeson, Elsie MacGill, Frances Hurd Clark, Mary Olga Soroka, Marie Luhring, Marie Reith, Olive Dennis, Margaret Ingels, Hilda Lyon and Amy Johnson. In 1939 World War II broke out in Europe and she got a job at the Grumman Aircraft Corporation where she worked on several aircraft but in particular the Grumman XF5F Skyrocket.

Ebel went on to work at smaller companies before she became a research engineer for United Airlines in 1942. In the following year she was highlighted by the Christian Science Monitor as the only woman aeronautical engineer employed by United.

She was discriminated against when finding employment, but she noted that once she had the job then being a woman was no hindrance (or help) in doing the work.

== Death and legacy ==
Ebel died in Santa Barbara in 1992. In 2016, MIT made a video about the contribution of MIT women to aerospace engineering. They noted that there was 48% women aerospace graduates at that date but the story started with Isabel Ebel - who had taken years to get a job.
