= M. Elsa Gardner =

American aeronautical engineer

- Born: 9 January 1894; Brooklyn
- Died: 8 February 1963 (aged 69); Ohio
- Occupation: Engineer

M. Elsa Gardner (9 January 1894 – 8 February 1963) was an American aeronautical engineer. She was the first woman admitted as a full member of the Engineers Club of Dayton.

== Biography ==
Maude Elsa Gardner was better known as Elsa Gardner. She was born in Brooklyn, New York on January 9, 1894, to Herbert, an Irish American draperies merchant, and Emily Maude Garner of Canadian extraction. When she was six she had an illness that left one leg shorter than the other which caused a long term limp.

== Education and career ==
Her family were well off and she went to St. Lawrence University where she studied mechanical engineering and mathematics, alongside Greek, Latin, French, German and English Literature. She felt her father intended her to become a teacher.

After graduating from college in 1916 Gardner worked as a statistician until the outbreak of the First World War. She began to work for the British Ministry of Munitions of War in New York City as a gauge examiner. From there she began to work for Bliss Company Torpedo Works on behalf of the U.S. Navy. She worked on process improvement for the standards of torpedo gauges. Then she laid the testing range at Sag Harbor. She later described the experience as the "noise was deafening and the dirt pretty awful, but they were more than counterbalanced by the interesting things going on all round me." Gardner decided she wanted a career in engineering and studied engineering further with New York University, and Pratt Institute. She worked during the day and studied at night, in direct opposition to her father who said "the more you learn, the less you earn" and refused to financially support her further study.

Gardner then won a scholarship to study at the aeronautical engineering department of Massachusetts Institute of Technology (MIT) and wrote and edited the Aero Digest magazine to top up her funds. She was a contemporary of aeronautical engineer Elsie MacGill, later known as "Queen of the Hurricanes". She encountered more issues at MIT when the shop work requirement involved working for the naval yard at Hartford, where the commander felt she would flirt with the men and distract them from their work. Gardner wrote him an indignant letter pointing out amongst other things that as a member of the American Society of Mechanical Engineers she would "hardly be likely to flirt with mechanics". She was allowed in and later commented "they were very meek about it" when she got there. Gardner was one of boarders in Manhattan's Panhellenic Tower.

After the end of the war and during the Great Depression Gardner worked for various companies including Wright Aeronautical Corp. in Paterson, New Jersey and as a bibliographer, statistician, and civil engineering Project Examiner. Gardner also worked in New York City for the American Society of Mechanical Engineers (ASME) writing abstracts and reviewing literature. She created a card index system organising aeronautical, mechanical, and automotive subjects. She also worked as a review editor and contributor for Aero Digest Magazine. Gardner wrote the Technical Data Digest, a twice-monthly publication that contained around 300 article abstracts in each issue, from America, British, French, German and Italian technical magazines. It was also published in the Journal of Aeronautical Sciences. She was based in at Wright Field in Dayton, Ohio. Her work was instrumental in keeping the U.S. military and commercial sectors up to date and connected.

Gardner continued to work for the military through the Second World War. Between 1941 and 1960, she worked as an aeronautical engineer in the US Navy Bureau of Aeronautics, then on the staff of the US Navy's Bureau of Naval Weapons Technical Library until her retirement in the autumn of 1962.

== Memberships ==
As a result of her work Garder was the first woman to be invited to join both the Institute of the Aeronautical Sciences (IAS) and the Institute of Aeronautical Sciences (later to become the American Institute of Aeronautics and Astronautics).

She joined the Engineers Club of Dayton in 1936 as their first woman member.

Gardner joined the British Women's Engineering Society in 1929, going on to sit on the governing Council as the American representative and keeping up a lively cross Atlantic correspondence until the Second World War. Her speech on Women Engineers to the Altrusa Club, a chain of American clubs for business and professional women, was published in their International Altrusan magazine and by the Women's Engineering Society in 1937. In this speech she explained that whilst engineering jobs for women were hard to find in her youth, she had made sure that she joined, and then attended the meetings of as many engineering organisations as possible so that she became a familiar figure and was harder to dismiss. She listed a number of women engineers whose work she was aware of at the time, including Kate Gleeson, Elsie MacGill, Frances Hurd Clark, Mary Olga Soroka, Marie Luhring, Marie Reith, Olive Dennis, Isabel Ebel, Margaret Ingels, Hilda Lyon and Amy Johnson.

She was a long-term resident of Washington and a member of the New York Avenue Presbyterian Church.

== Death ==
She was diagnosed with cancer in 1962 and died at Doctor's Hospital in Washington on 8 February 1963.
