= Margaret Ingels =

Mechanical engineer

- Born: October 25, 1892; Paris, Kentucky
- Died: December 13, 1971 (aged 79); Lexington, Kentucky
- Education: B.S. in Mechanical Engineering, 1916
- Alma mater: University of Kentucky
- Occupation: Mechanical Engineering
- Employer: Carrier-Lyle Corporation
- Known for: Pioneer in the development of air conditioning. First female engineering graduate from the University of Kentucky; second woman engineering graduate in the United States; first woman to receive the professional degree of Mechanical Engineer.

Margaret Ingels (October 25, 1892 – December 13, 1971) was an American engineer. She is known as the first female engineering graduate from the University of Kentucky, receiving her Bachelor of Science degree in mechanical engineering in 1916. She was also the second woman engineering graduate in the United States and the first woman to receive a professional degree of Mechanical Engineer.

Her work on air conditioning included "developing the “effective temperature” scale to incorporate humidity and air movement in the equation for human comfort".

== Early life ==
Margaret Ingels was born on 25 October 1892. She attended school in her home town of Paris, Kentucky and was fascinated by scientific and engineering subjects, her interest having been sparked at a young age when she noticed moisture collecting on cold glass and learned about condensation.

She continued her education at the University of Kentucky, receiving her Bachelor of Science degree in mechanical engineering in 1916. She was the first woman to graduate in engineering from the university.

== Career ==
Following graduation, she worked for the Chicago Telephone Company in the traffic engineering department.

She then left Chicago in 1917 for Pittsburgh and the Carrier Engineering Corporation, where her interest in air conditioning began.

She received her Mechanical Engineering professional degree in 1920 and the next year she joined the American Society of Heating and Ventilating Engineers research lab, where she studied air conditioning for six years. "She perfected a new portable machine that determines the amount of germ-laden dust in schoolrooms and public places" while conducting field tests for the New York Commission on School Ventilation.

In 1931, she returned to the Carrier-Lyle Corporation where she stayed until her retirement. At Carrier, she "helped perfect the sling psychrometer, which is used to read the relative humidity of the air".

She was a spokesperson for the profession, speaking to more than 12,000 people during more than 200 speeches from 1932 to 1952. In 1937, she was included in an article by M. Elsa Gardner on Women Engineers in the journal of the Women's Engineering Society, alongside Kate Gleeson, Elsie MacGill, Frances Hurd Clark, Mary Olga Soroka, Marie Lurhing, Marie Reith, Olive Dennis, Isabel Ebel, Hilda Lyon and Amy Johnson.

In 1940 she was selected as one of 100 women in the United States who had successful careers in fields not open to women in 1840.

== Works ==
- Ingels, Margaret (1972). Willis Haviland Carrier, father of air conditioning. Technology and society. New York: Arno Press. ISBN 0405047088.
- Ingels, Margaret (1925). Comparative tests of instruments for determining atmospheric dusts ... Washington, D.C.: Government Printing Office. LCCN 25026420.

She wrote more than 45 technical papers, as well as an article titled Petticoats and Slide Rules, which documented "the pioneer American women of the engineering field".

== Legacy and Commemoration ==
A dormitory named Ingels Hall was opened in August 2005 at the University of Kentucky intended for women engineering students.

The Collegiate Section of the Society of Women Engineers at the University of Kentucky established a Fellowship Fund in her memory for students enrolled in a Master of Science or Ph.D. program in an engineering discipline.
