= Helen Hughes-Brock =

Helen Hughes-Brock (born 1938) is an independent scholar working in the archaeology of the Minoan civilization of Crete and Mycenaean Greece.

== Personal life ==
She was born in Montreal in 1938 to Everett Cherrington Hughes and Helen MacGill Hughes. She was educated at Regina Coeli (Québec), the University of Chicago Laboratory Schools, Cambridgeshire High School for Girls and Somerville College, University of Oxford (B.A. in Classics, Dip. Class. Arch.). She was elected Fellow of the Society of Antiquaries of London in 1990. She lives in Oxford with her husband, Sebastian Brock.

== Scholarship ==
Hughes-Brock is a respected scholar of beads and seals in particular. Her principal interests are beads, seals and the finds of amber on Minoan and Mycenaean sites. She participated in British excavations at Palaikastro and the Mycenae Cult Centre and with the University of Minnesota at Nichoria and has contributed to reports on other excavations. She has served on the Bead Study Trust (1983–1994) and the International Committee for the Study of Amber in Archaeology. She has also occasionally participated in the work of her husband, Sebastian Brock, on Syriac studies. In the 1960s and 1970s on their journeys in the Syriac heartlands of S.E. Turkey, Syria and Iraq she took photographs of places which are now modernized, damaged or altogether destroyed. These have now been digitized at Beth Mardutho Syriac Institute at Piscataway, New Jersey.

== Selected publications ==
=== Beads ===
- 'Greek beads of the Mycenaean period (ca. 1650–1100 BC): The age of the heroines of Greek tradition and mythology’. In L.D. Sciama and J.B. Eicher (eds.), Beads and Bead Makers: Gender, Material Culture and Meaning (Oxford/New York 1998), 247–71.
- ‘Mycenaean beads: gender and social contexts’, OxfJournArch 18 (1999), 277–96.
- ‘The Mycenaean Greeks, master bead-makers — major results since the time of Horace Beck’. In I. C. Glover, H. Hughes-Brock and J. Henderson (eds.), Ornaments from the Past — Bead Studies after Beck (London/Bangkok, The Bead Study Trust 2003), 10–22.
- Contributions to The Bead Study Trust, Catalogue of the Beck Collection at the Museum of Archaeology and Anthropology, Cambridge part 1: Europe. Bead Study Trust, 1997.
- The Bead Study Trust Newsletter, major contributor of annotated lists to ‘Recently Published Work on Beads’ section, also occasional news items and reviews, nos. 2–50 (1983 to 2009, the last issue).
- ‘A useful model for bead surveys,’ Bead Study Trust Newsletter 44 (2004), 2.

=== Beads and seals together ===
- ‘Seals and beads: their shapes and materials compared.’ In Corpus der minoischen und mykenischen Siegel Beiheft 5 (Berlin 1995), 105–16.
- ‘Close encounters of interesting kinds. Relief beads and glass seals: design and craftsmen.’ In C. M. Jackson and E. C. Wager (eds.), Vitreous Materials in the Late Bronze Age Aegean. Sheffield Studies in Aegean Archaeology 9 (2008), 126–50.;.
- ‘Exotic materials and objects sent to — and from? — the Bronze Age Aegean. Some recent work and some observations.’ In A. Vianello (ed.), Exotica in the Prehistoric Mediterranean. (Oxford 2011), 99–114. [See pp. 102–8 on Bernstorf and Qatna.].
- ‘The waz-lily and the priest’s axe: can relief-beads tell us something?’ In Y. Galanakis, T. Wilkinson and J. Bennet (eds.), AΘΥΡΜΑΤΑ.….in Honour of Susan Sherratt (Oxford 2014), 105–16.
- ‘Two cushions, a Bes, a boar and a bead; new “discoveries” in the Aegean collection at the Ashmolean’ in N. Sekunda (ed.), Wonders Lost and Found: A Celebration of the Archaeological Work of Professor Michael Vickers (Oxford, Archaeopress 2020), pp. 8–17.
- ‘Minoan engraved ringstones and a unique polyonymous sealstone with ramifications’ in B. Davis and R. Laffineur (eds.), ΝΕΩΤΕΡΟΣ [NEOTEROS]: Studies in Aegean Bronze Age Art and Archaeology in Honor of Professor John G. Younger on the Occasion of his Retirement. Aegaeum 44 (Leuven/Liège, Peeters, 2020), pp. 141–153.

=== Seals ===
- Corpus der minoischen und mykenischen Siegel VI: Oxford, The Ashmolean Museum (with John Boardman) (Mainz 2009). Olga Krzyszkowska AmerJournArch 115/3 (July 2011), www.ajaonline 115/3, 2011, www.ajaonline.org/book-review/966.
- ‘Two sealstones from Mochlos’(with P. M. Warren), Kretika Chronika 1963, 352–5.
- ‘The early Cretan white seals in the Ashmolean Museum, ancient and modern: some enigmatic materials’. In Corpus der minoischen und mykenischen Siegel Beiheft 3 (Berlin 1989), 79–89.
- ‘Echt oder falsch? Trials, rehabilitations and banishments of some suspects in the Ashmolean collection’. In Corpus der minoischen und mykenischen Siegel Beiheft 6 (Berlin 2000), 107–121.
- ‘The many facets of seal research and the contribution of the CMS.’ In Corpus der minoischen und mykenischen Siegel Beiheft 8 (Mainz 2010), 225–37.
- ‘Seals of Bronze Age Greece’. In Y. Galanakis (ed.), The Aegean World: A Guide to the Cycladic, Minoan and Mycenaean Antiquities in the Ashmolean Museum (Oxford 2013), 152–65.
- Review of Paul Yule, 'Early Cretan Seals,' in The Classical Review 33.1 (1983):88-89.

=== Amber ===
- ‘Amber in the Mycenaean world’ (with A. Harding and C.W.Beck), Annual of the British School at Athens 69 (1974), 145–74.
- ‘Amber and the Mycenaeans.’ In J. M. Todd (ed.), Studies in Baltic Amber. Journal of Baltic Studies XVI, special issue (1985), 257–67.
- ‘Amber bead sensation from the Ukraine’ Bead Study Trust Newsletter 29 (1997), 4.
- ‘Mycenaean amber beads and ornaments: what can we learn from their shapes — and from one another?’ In Unione Internazionale delle Scienze Preistoriche e Protostoriche 1996: atti del XIII congresso, Forlì 1996, vol. 6/1 (Forlì, A.B.A.C.O., 1998), 491–6.
- ‘Amber in the Aegean in the Late Bronze Age: some problems and perspectives.’ In C. W. Beck and J. Bouzek (eds.), Amber in Archaeology: Proc. of the Second International Conference on Amber in Archaeology, 1990 (Prague 1993), 219–29.
- ‘Amber beads in archaeology: publications since ca. 1993. In C. W. Beck, I. B. Loze and J. M. Todd (eds.), Amber in Archaeology: Proc. of the Fourth International Conference on Amber in Archaeology, 2001 (Riga 2003), 236–55.
- ‘Baltic amber: two new conference volumes’ Bead Study Trust Newsletter 42 (2003), 3.
- ‘Amber and some other travellers in the Bronze Age Aegean and Europe.’ In A. Dakouri-Hild and S. Sherratt (eds.), Autochthon: Papers Presented to O.T.P.K. Dickinson on the Occasion of his Retirement. BritArchReports – Internat. Series 1432 (Oxford 2005), 301–16.
- ‘Amber in archaeology: publications since ca. 2000.’ In A. Palavestra, C. W. Beck and J. M. Todd (eds.), Amber in Archaeology: Proc. of the Fifth International Conference on Amber in Archaeology, 2006. (Belgrade 2009, 304–51.
- Remarks on Bernstorf amber finds in ‘Exotic materials and objects sent to — and from? — the Bronze Age Aegean’ (see above), 102–8.
- Harding, A., & Hughes-Brock, H. (2017). ‘Mycenaeans in Bavaria? Amber and gold from the Bronze Age site of Bernstorf’. Antiquity, 91(359), 1382-1385. doi:10.15184/aqy.2017.147
- In preparation: catalogue of Aegean amber finds for expanded English edition of Bursztyn w Kulturze Mykeńskiej by Janusz Czebreszuk (Poznań 2011)

=== Contributions to excavation reports ===
- ‘The beads, loomweights, etc.’ In J. N. Coldstream, Knossos: The Sanctuary of Demeter (BritSchAthens, 1973), 114–23.
- ‘Miscellaneous small finds’ (with W.D.E. Coulson). In W.A. McDonald et al. (eds.), Excavations at Nichoria III: Dark Age and Byzantine Occupation (Minneapolis, 1983), 292–4, 312–5.
- ‘Terracotta and miscellaneous small finds’. In W.A. McDonald and N.C. Wilkie (eds.). Excavations at Nichoria II: The Bronze Age Occupation (Minneapolis, 1992), 625–37, 651–73.
- ‘Asine Chamber Tomb I:1 — the small finds’. In R. Hägg et al. (eds.), Asine III, fasc.1. (Skrifter Utgivna av Svenska Institutet i Athen, XLV:1, 1996), 69–80.
- ‘Notes on sealing, stoppers, faience bead. In Sparta: Menelaion I by H.W. Catling with others (BritSchAthens 2009), 289–302 passim.

=== Miscellaneous ===
- Review article; ‘Ivory and Related Materials [by O. Krzyszkowska, 1990] and some recent work on Bronze Age relations between Crete and the Aegean’, Discussions in Egyptology 23 (1992), 23–37.
- ‘Animal, vegetable, mineral: some evidence from small objects.' In A. Karetsou (ed.), Κρήτη − Αίγυπτος. Πολιτισμικοί Δεσμοί Τριών Χιλιετιών, Μελέτες [Crete−Egypt, Cultural Links over Three Millennia, Studies] (Athens 2000), 120–7.
- ‘Helen Waterhouse and her “Priest-Kings?” paper’ (with Lucy Goodison), Cretan Studies 7 (2002), 89–98.
- In Bead Study Trust Newsletter, selected items:
  - ‘War losses from Berlin museums’, 28 (1996), 12.
  - ‘Looting of archaeological sites — a story with a happy ending’ [on Aïdonia and the repatriated Mycenaean treasure], 28 (1996), 14.
  - ‘Don’t trust appearances! A “bead” in Hungary which wasn't’, 35 (2000), 14.
  - ‘Who were the invaders?’ Foreigners’ beads in early medieval Greece’, [re Avars and Slavs], 40 (2002), 10–11.
  - rev. of M. Vickers and A. Kakhidze, Pichvnari— Result of Excavations Conducted by the Joint British-Georgian Pichvnari Expedition 1998–2002: Greeks and Colchians on the East Coast of the Black Sea, 44 (2004), 12.
- Review of Pauline Johnstone, "The Byzantine Tradition in Church Embroidery." Journal of Hellenic Studies 89:196.
- ‘The renewal of monastic life for women in a monastery in Tur Abdin’ (with Elijbah Gülcan), Sobornost 7:4 (1977).
- English translation of Guide to the Munich Antikensammlungen (1969/1983) and The Munich Glyptothek (1974/1992) by Dieter Ohly.
- Review of E.J.W. Barber, Prehistoric Textiles, in Antiquity 66/250 (1992), 271–2.
- Obituary for Elektra Megaw, British School at Athens, Annual Report of the Managing Committee 1992–1993, 44–45.
- Obituary for Mary Wynn Burn (1910–2000), British School at Athens, Annual Report of Council 1999–2000, 50.
- Obituary for Nancy Katherine Sandars. Biographical Memoirs of Fellows of the British Academy, XIX, 105–128. British Academy 2020.

https://www.thebritishacademy.ac.uk/publishing/memoirs/19/sandars-nancy-1914-2015/

=== Edited and co-edited volumes ===
- Knossos: A Labyrinth of History. Papers Presented in Honour of Sinclair Hood (with D. Evely and N. Momigliano). BritSchAthens 1994.
- Papers presented at conference in honour of Sinclair Hood in 1994 (with D. Evely and N. Momigliano) in Cretan Studies 5 (1996).
- Cretan Studies 7 (2002) in memory of R.F. Willetts.
- Ornaments from the Past — Bead Studies after Beck (with I. C. Glover and J. Henderson). (The Bead Study Trust, London/Bangkok 2003).
