= Ethel H. Bailey =

American mechanical engineer

- Born: 18 August 1896; Houlton, Maine, USA
- Died: 5 July 1985 (aged 88); Concord, Massachusetts, USA
- Resting place: Farmington, Franklin, Maine, USA
- Education: George Washington University
- Engineering career
- Discipline: Mechanical engineering
- Employers: Raytheon Manufacturing Company; Massachusetts Institute of Technology

Ethel H. Bailey (18 August 1896 – 5 July 1985) was an American mechanical engineer who began her working life in aviation and went on to develop radar and spectroscopic equipment. She was called a 'trailblazer' by fellow engineer Margaret Ingels in a 1952 speech. Bailey was a member of the American Automotive Society (the first woman to be admitted as a full member, in 1926), the American Society of Mechanical Engineers, the Society of American Military Engineers, and the National Society of Professional Engineers. She was also a member of the British Women's Engineering Society and contributed to their journal, The Woman Engineer.

== Early life ==
Ethel H. Bailey was born on 18 August 1896 in Houlton, Maine, USA, to Walter and Anna Bailey (née Sanders). She had one sister, Margaret (b. 1889).

== Education ==
Bailey had been interested in radios and motorboats at high school, and during the First World War she became an assistant inspector of Liberty L-12 aeroplane engines for the U.S. government, at a test airfield in Indianapolis.

After the war she studied at the Michigan State Automobile School in Detroit in 1918, and George Washington University in 1920.

== Career ==
During and after the First World War, Bailey was employed by Lowe, Willard, Fowler Engineering Company in Queens, New York, working as an aeronautical material engineer on their contracts with both the US Navy and Army Air Services. Bailey oversaw testing for materials and parts for T-3 Army Transport planes and Type XII bombers built for the army, and the US Navy's Davis-Douglas torpedo planes.

In 1920, Bailey joined the staff of the Society of Automotive Engineers (SAE) as a research engineer and became the organisation's first full female member in 1926. (Marie Luhring had been admitted as an associate member of the SAE in 1920). In June 1925 she published a paper in The Woman Engineer journal entitled A Ternary Alloy Bearing Metal (The Development of a Material of Unusual Wearing Qualities).

In September 1925 she travelled to Paris where she visited Marie Curie at her home. She then travelled to London, where she represented the Society of Automotive Engineers at the very first International Conference of Women in Science, Industry and Commerce organised by Caroline Haslett and the Women's Engineering Society during the British Empire Exhibition at Wembley. She spoke on 'Automotive Research' undertaken by the SAE, speaking alongside physical chemist Isabel Hadfield and electrical engineer Margaret Partridge. She was also credited as part of the Advisory Committee for the high profile conference.

In 1929, Bailey wrote an appreciation of Katharine Wright Haskell (1874—1929) the sister, supporter and business manager of aviation pioneers Wilbur and Orville Wright, for the American magazine Airway Age, and reproduced in the British The Woman Engineer journal. She ended the article with "Orville the Flyer, Wilbur the Adviser and Katharine the Inspirer".

In 1929 she moved to a new job at the General Electric Co.’s Bloomfield works.

During the World War II, Bailey worked procuring radar equipment at the Signal Corps Radar Laboratory, and went on to organize radar equipment for the U.S. Navy, as a mechanical engineer at the Raytheon Manufacturing Company in Waltham, Massachusetts. In 1945 she was director of the technical publications division of a printing company in Boston, Massachusetts. She went on to be research assistant at the Department of Biology at the Massachusetts Institute of Technology, developing spectroscopic equipment. She was still working at MIT in 1967.

== Death ==
Ethel H. Bailey died on 5 July 1985 in Concord, Massachusetts, at the age of 88, and was buried in Farmington, Maine.

== Articles ==
- 'Automotive Research' in The Woman Engineer, 2:4 (1925) pp.72–3.
