= University of Kentucky College of Engineering =

Engineering school in Lexington, Kentucky, US

Coordinates: 38°02′14.50″N 84°30′20″W

University of Kentucky Stanley and Karen Pigman College of Engineering
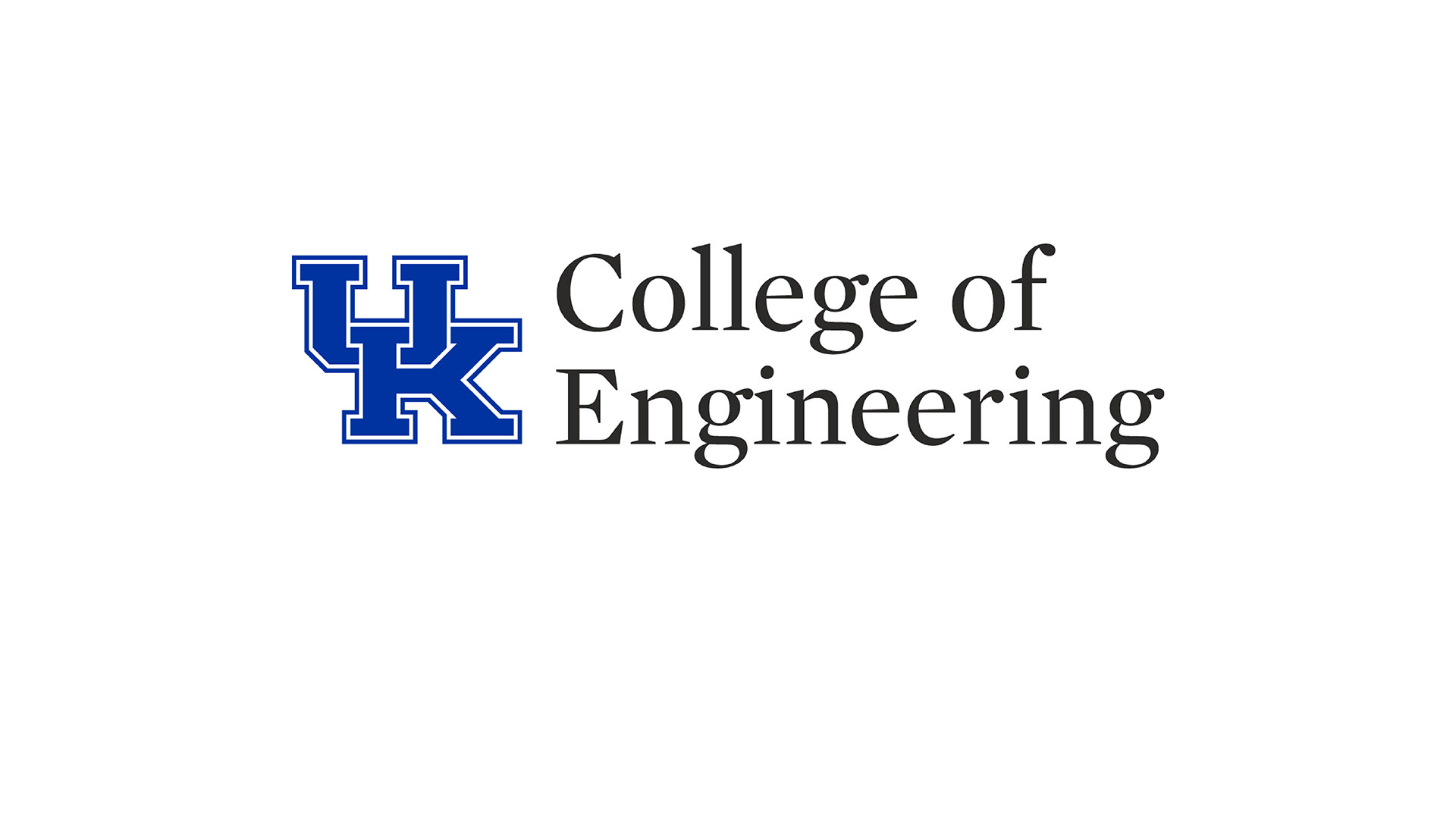
- Type: Public
- Established: 1865; 161 years ago
- Dean: Rudolph G. Buchheit
- Location: Lexington, Kentucky, USA
- Website: www.engr.uky.edu

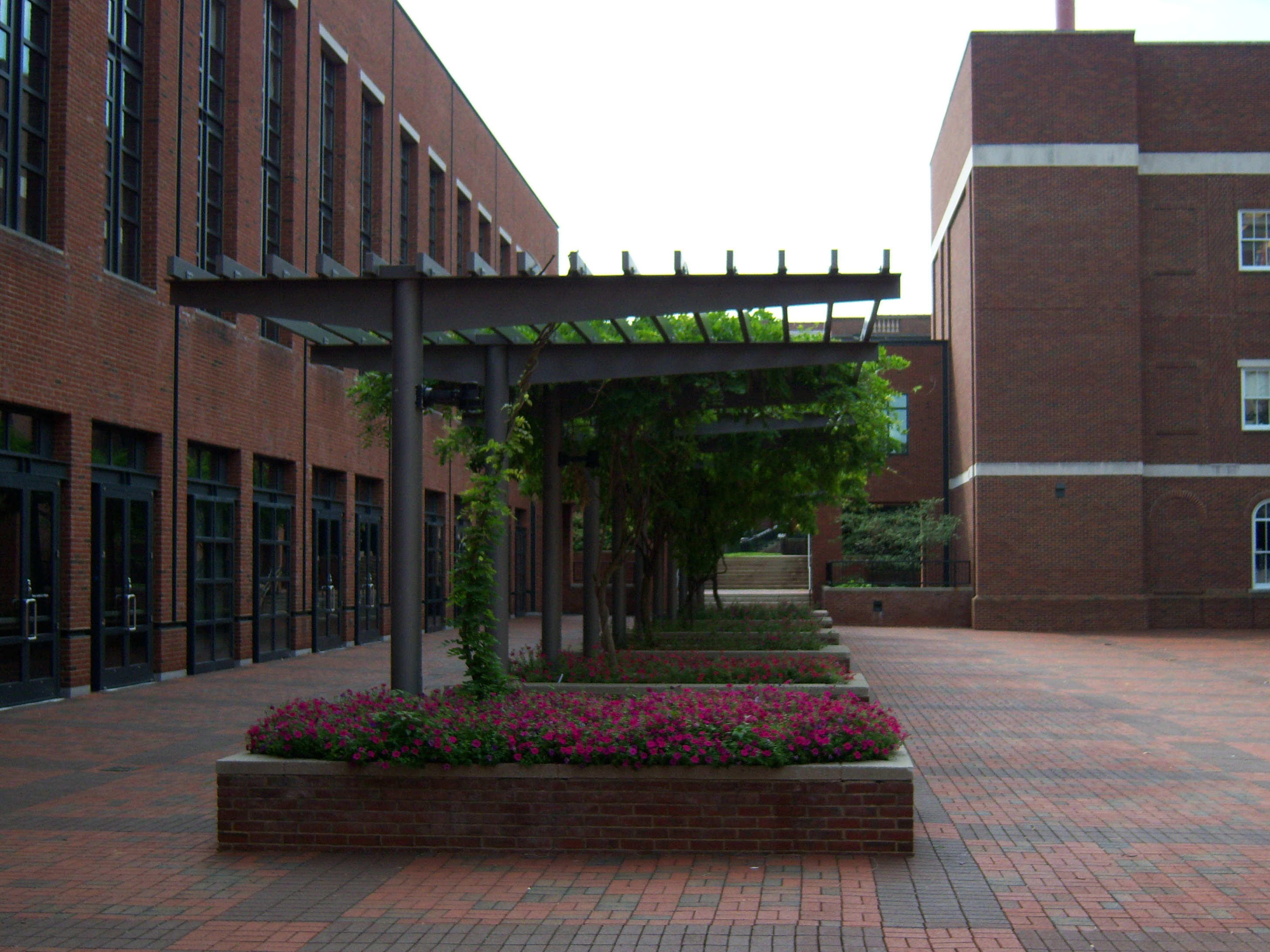
Engineering Quadrangle

The University of Kentucky Stanley and Karen Pigman College of Engineering is an ABET accredited, public engineering school located on the campus of the University of Kentucky. The college has eight departments. The college operates the University of Kentucky College of Engineering Extended Campus at Paducah in partnership with West Kentucky Community and Technical College in Paducah, Kentucky, offering bachelor's degrees in chemical engineering and mechanical engineering.

The college offers nine undergraduate degrees: aerospace engineering, biosystems engineering, chemical engineering, civil engineering, computer engineering, computer science, electrical engineering, materials engineering, mechanical engineering, and mining engineering. It also offers master's and doctoral degrees in biomedical engineering, biosystems engineering, chemical engineering, civil engineering, computer science, electrical engineering, materials engineering, mechanical engineering, and mining engineering. A master's degree in manufacturing systems engineering is available online.

Engineering education at the University of Kentucky goes back to the founding of the university as a Land-grant university in 1865. William Benjamin Munson, the University of Kentucky's first graduate in 1869, studied engineering and became a prosperous entrepreneur. John Wesley Gunn, Class of 1890, earned the first awarded engineering degree. Margaret Ingels earned a mechanical engineering degree in 1916, becoming the first woman to receive an engineering degree from the University of Kentucky College of Engineering. When she later received a master's degree in mechanical engineering, she made history as the first woman in the United States to earn a graduate degree in engineering. The first African-American student to receive an undergraduate degree from the University of Kentucky was Holloway Fields Jr., who graduated with an electrical engineering degree in 1951.

The college currently occupies approximately 320,000 square feet of space. College administration resides in the Ralph G. Anderson Building, which opened in 2002. Thomas W. Lester served as dean from 1990 to 2012, the longest tenure for any dean at the University of Kentucky in its history. In 2018, the college hired Rudolph G. Buchheit from the College of Engineering at Ohio State to serve as dean.

On May 1, 2023, University President Eli Capilouto announced that Stanley Pigman and his wife Karen, would be donating $34.5 million to the college of engineering and would be renamed Stanley and Karen Pigman College of Engineering.

== Notable alumni ==
- Ralph G. Anderson, founder of Belcan Corporation
- Matt Cutts, early Google employee and former head of Google's web spam team
- Mark E. Davis, current professor at Caltech and member of the National Academy of Engineering
- Margaret Ingels, pioneer of air conditioning technology, advocate for women in engineering
- Sannie Overly, member of the Kentucky House of Representatives
- Paul Patton, 59th Governor of Kentucky
- Stanley Pigman, Mining executive
- Murray Raney, American mechanical engineer, developer of Raney nickel
- Lee Todd, inventor, entrepreneur, and 11th president of the University of Kentucky
- William T. Young, businessman and philanthropist
