= Helen Gregory MacGill =

Canadian judge, writer (1864–1947)

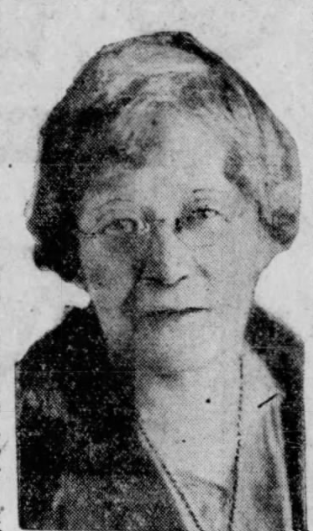
Helen Gregory MacGill (1932)

Helen Gregory MacGill (née Gregory; after first marriage, Flesher; January 7, 1864 – February 27, 1947) was a Canadian judge, journalist and women's rights advocate. She was one of Canada's first woman judges, and for many years the country's only woman judge.

== Biography ==
Helen Emma Gregory was born in Hamilton, Ontario, the daughter of Emma and Silas Ebenezer Gregory. Her maternal grandfather was Upper Canada barrister and judge Miles O'Reilly, who successfully defended the group accused of participating in the 1837 Upper Canada Rebellion. She became the first woman to receive a Bachelor of Music from Trinity College, and she also earned a M.A. degree in 1889 from this institution (now part of the University of Toronto). She was the only woman in her class and the first female graduate, and the first woman in the British Empire to receive a degree in music. She then went into newspaper work, working as a journalist for Cosmopolitan.

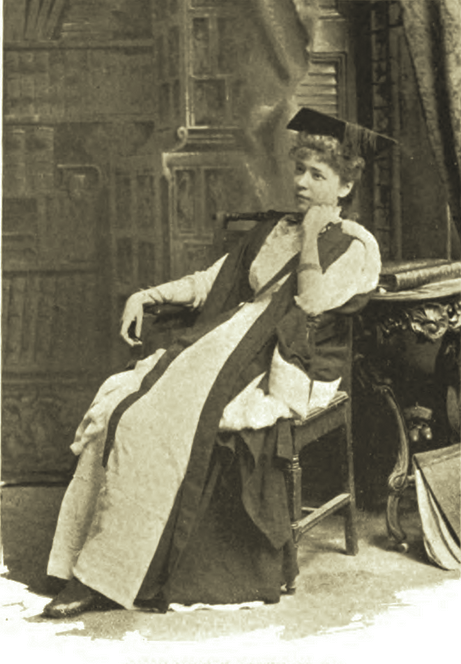
Helen Gregory Flesher

MacGill first married in 1890; her first husband, F.C. "Lee" Flesher, died in 1901 from the consequences of an earlier knife attack from one of the patients at the Mayo Clinic, leaving behind two young boys, Eric (1891) and Freddy (1894). She married the lawyer James Henry "Jim" MacGill, a friend from her college days, in 1902. With MacGill, she gave birth to two daughters, "Young Helen" (Dr. Helen MacGill Hughes (1903), and Elsie MacGill (1905), a pioneering female aeronautical engineer and aircraft designer.

She died on February 27, 1947, in Chicago, Illinois, at the age of 83.

== Life as a journalist ==
As part of her job as a foreign correspondent for Cosmopolitan magazine, MacGill had as her first assignment the interview of leading members of the Japanese parliament in 1890. She also wrote several articles for the Toronto Globe, and wrote for other magazines and papers like the Vancouver Daily World and People’s Magazine.

== Life as a judge ==
As part of her political and social role, MacGill was involved in the legal and political realities of British Columbia. As chair of the Laws Committee of the University Women’s Club, she was concerned about the situation of domestic legislation in the province. This situation led her to learn on her own about the subject, and then she self-published the book Daughters, Wives and Mothers in British Columbia as a guidebook with the laws regarding the topic.

MacGill became the first British Columbia female judge in 1917 and the third in Canada. She served as a juvenile court judge from 1917 to 1929, and then from 1934 to 1945. After 23 years of service, she retired at the age of 81.

As part of her legacy, she contributed to the study of the field of juvenile delinquency. She also worked for improvements in the social welfare system.

== Life as feminist ==
MacGill was a feminist within the system that rejected radical feminism and believed that the role of a mother was the one that should allow women to be part of the public sphere. During her life, she advocated for women’s rights, such as the right to vote, and she also fought for inclusive changes for women and children from the legal reform perspective.

Always active in women's rights, she became a member of the British Columbia Minimum Wage Board, periodically chairing meetings, and referring debates on sector-based minimum wages. She was a co-founder of the Vancouver Business and Professional Women's Club in 1923. In 1930, she was instrumental in creating the Canadian Federation of Business and Professional Women Clubs. While her husband had strong ties to the Laurier Liberals, Helen MacGill was a committed Conservative.
