= CCF Maple Leaf Trainer II =

Canadian biplane trainer

Maple Leaf Trainer II
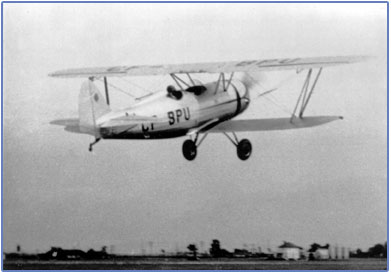

General information
- Type: trainer
- Manufacturer: Canadian Car and Foundry
- Designer: Elsie MacGill
- Primary user: Mexican Air Force
- Number built: 10

History
- First flight: 31 October 1939

The Maple Leaf Trainer II was a Canadian biplane trainer designed by Elsie MacGill in 1938 and manufactured by the Canadian Car and Foundry. Although it was intended for use as a basic trainer for the Royal Canadian Air Force, it was rejected and the only completed airframe was sold to Mexico, the remaining nine aircraft were later built there.

== Design and development ==
In 1937, Canadian Car and Foundry obtained rights to the Wallace Trainer designed by Leland Stamford Wallace. The nearly-complete project was a biplane with two open cockpits, powered by a Kinner B-5 engine. Featuring welded steel-tube fuselage, ailerons and tail with a wing structure utilizing spruce spars and ribs, the aircraft was fabric covered, except for aluminium panelled cockpit and engine areas. Canadian Car and Foundry renamed it the Maple Leaf I.

In 1938, once the Maple Leaf I was complete, the new Chief Designer Elsie McGill began work on the Maple Leaf II, which, except for the use of the fin and rudder from the earlier aircraft, was a new design. A conventional structure based on welded steel tube fuselage and steel-tube tail, aluminium alloy ribs with wooden wings was employed. Designed around British design requirements for strength, the Maple Leaf II was intended to be fully aerobatic. In order to expedite development and to ensure no interruption in the ongoing Hawker Hurricane production lines, a number of components were "farmed out" to sub-contractors.

== Operational history ==
The Maple Leaf II prototype was ready for flight testing in October 1939; one of the unusual aspects of the program was that the designer accompanied company Sales Manager O.C.S. Wallace who acted as a test pilot on the first flight, 31 October 1939. Tests indicated excellent results with stable and docile flight characteristics, however, the RCAF test pilots felt that a basic trainer had to be more challenging.

After evaluation by the RCAF and the Department of Transport in 1940, the Maple Leaf II was exported to Mexico via Port Washington on Long Island, USA. Along with the finished prototype, two semi-complete airframes with blueprints, jigs, tools and all accessories were sold to the Mexican Air Force school (EMA). One of the "kit" aircraft was assembled and flown as the Ares 2. It differed slightly from the Maple Leaf II in having enlarged vertical tail surfaces and an uncowled engine.

In total, 10 examples were built in Mexico during 1940, and were equipped with the Warner Super Scarab 165 hp engine.

== Operators ==
- Mexico
  - Mexican Air Force 10 units built.

== Specifications (Maple Leaf Trainer II) ==
Data from Canadian Aircraft Since 1909

General characteristics

- Crew: 2
- Length: 23 ft 5 in (7.13 m)
- Wingspan: 32 ft 0 in (9.75 m)
- Height: 8 ft 2 in (2.48 m)
- Wing area: 197.9 sq ft (18.39 m^{2})
- Empty weight: 1,278 lb (580 kg)
- Gross weight: 1,875 lb (850 kg)
- Powerplant: 1 × Warner Super Scarab Seven-cylinder, air-cooled, radial piston engine, 165 hp (123 kW)

Performance

- Maximum speed: 103 kn (118 mph, 190 km/h)
- Cruise speed: 88 kn (101 mph, 163 km/h)
- Service ceiling: 16,600 ft (5,100 m) (absolute ceiling)
- Rate of climb: 420 ft/min (2.1 m/s)
