= Helen MacGill Hughes =

American sociologist

Helen MacGill Hughes (1903–1992) was a sociologist of the Chicago school and a feminist.

== Personal life ==
Helen MacGill was born in Vancouver, British Columbia in 1903. Her mother was Helen Gregory MacGill, and her father was James Henry MacGill, a lawyer. She was close with her sister, Elsie MacGill, who became an aeronautical engineer and served on the first Royal Commission on the Status of Women.

In 1925, Helen MacGill graduated from the University of British Columbia, where she had studied economics and German, and she was considering graduate school in the United States when she met Professor Robert Park. Park offered MacGill a Laura Spelman Rockefeller fellowship at the University of Chicago’s sociology department. MacGill accepted and lived with Park and his family for a while before marrying another of Park’s students, Everett Cherrington Hughes, in Vancouver on August 18, 1927.

Together, the couple had two daughters: Helen Hughes-Brock and Elizabeth G.R. Hughes Schneewind. The couple continued living in Chicago until 1961, when they moved to Cambridge, Massachusetts, so that Everett Hughes could join the faculty at Brandeis University. Subsequently, Helen MacGill Hughes held part-time research positions at Brandeis University and Harvard University.

Helen MacGill Hughes died in Baltimore, Maryland in 1992.

== Scholarship ==
Retrospective accounts of the work of Everett Hughes sometimes dwell on the importance of his wife and their different career paths. Helen MacGill Hughes completed her doctoral dissertation in 1937 under Robert Park, and it was published as News and the Human Interest Story; Hughes took thirteen years to complete the dissertation, and while writing it, she also worked with Everett Hughes on his first book, French Canada in Transition. In the preface of this book, Everett Hughes writes that he and Helen "jointly did the field work for the study". Sociologist Lewis A. Coser, in writing on the subject of Everett Hughes' career, cited Arlene Kaplan Daniels, a colleague of Helen MacGill Hughes', as saying that throughout this time, "[Hughes'] career was fashioned around his."

In 1938, while living in Chicago, Hughes took five years away from her work to raise her daughters, subsequently returning to work as an assistant editor of the American Journal of Sociology, a position she held from 1944 to 1961. Here, Hughes was known for her ability to improve others' written arguments, as well as her skill in cutting out unneeded words and jargon. In print, she characterized herself and other academic wives of faculty members in terms of the sociology, work, and fictive kinship as "maid of all work or departmental sister-in-law."

In 1952, Helen MacGill Hughes and Everett Hughes jointly published a study on intergroup relations. Throughout the early 1950s, MacGill Hughes worked with Howard Becker on his interviews with young drug addicts, and edited one woman's story into a book, The Fantastic Lodge: The Autobiography of a Girl Drug Addict (1961).

In 1967, the American Sociological Association invited Hughes to lead in compiling a series of seven volumes of sociological readings for secondary schools: the 1970 Reading in Sociology Series volumes on Cities and City Life, Delinquents and Criminals, Life in Families, Racial and Ethnic Relations, Social Organizations, Population Growth and the Complex Society, and Crowd and Mass Behavior. Hughes was also known to have edited six textbooks for a project on secondary education sponsored by the American Sociological Association, called "Sociological Resources for Social Studies."

In her own work, Hughes often reflected on her own experiences from a sociological perspective and lectured on the subject. One such lecture was "Women in academic sociology, 1925–75," delivered to the plenary session of the 50th annual convention of the North Central Sociological Association, Columbus, Ohio, May 4, 1975. Another was "WASP/Woman/Sociologist."

In 1973, Hughes was elected vice president of the Sociologists for Women in Society, and in 1978, she was elected president of the Eastern Sociological Association as well as vice president of the American Sociological Association. Hughes' work has been discussed in the context of gender by Aimee-Marie Dorsten.
