= Everett Hughes (sociologist) =

American sociologist (1897 – 1983)

Everett C. Hughes
- Born: November 30, 1897; Beaver, Ohio, US
- Died: January 4, 1983 (aged 85); Cambridge, Massachusetts, US
- Spouse: Helen MacGill Hughes
- Scientific career
- Fields: Sociology

Everett Cherrington Hughes (November 30, 1897 – January 4, 1983) was an American sociologist best known for his work on ethnic relations, work and occupations and the methodology of fieldwork. His take on sociology was, however, very broad. In recent scholarship, his theoretical contribution to sociology has been discussed as interpretive institutional ecology, forming a theoretical frame of reference that combines elements of the classical ecological theory of class (human ecology, functionalism, Georg Simmel, aspects of a Max Weber-inspired analysis of class, status and political power), and elements of a proto-dependency analysis of Quebec's industrialization in the 1930s (Helmes-Hayes 2000).

The efforts to look for a broader theoretical framework in Hughes's work have also been criticized as anachronistic search for coherent theoretical core when Hughes is more easily associated with a methodological orientation (Chapoulie 1996, see also Helmes-Hayes 1998, 2000 on critiques of his attempts to analyze Hughes's theoretical contribution). Hughes's pathbreaking contribution to the development of fieldwork as a sociological method is, however, unquestionable (see Chapoulie 2002).

== Overview ==
Hughes is often discussed only in relation to his contribution to the Chicago school. Therefore, it is seldom noted that he was one of the early contributors to the sociological analysis of Nazi Germany. Two classical essays, "Good People and Dirty Work" and "The Gleichschaltung of the German Statistical Yearbook: A Case in Professional Political Neutrality" witness of his lifelong commitment in sociology as a humanistic enterprise. In his preface to a collection of his papers entitled The Sociological Eye Hughes writes

I heard the Brown Shirts in the streets of Nuremberg in 1930 singing, "The German youth is never so happy as when Jewish blood spurts from his knife;" I wrote "Good People and Dirty Work" and used it as a special lecture at McGill University where in the 1930s I taught a course on Social Movements that came to be known as "Hughes on the Nazis." (Hughes 1984, xv).

Hughes's essays reflect his insight into German society, the developments of which he keenly followed during a long time. He spent a year there 1930–1931 when he was preparing a study on the Catholic labour movement (Chapoulie 1996, 14) and returned after the war for visits together with a delegation of U.S. scholars. He was fluent in German. He also had a keen interest in Canadian society, where his fluent knowledge of French language allowed him to develop ties to French-speaking sociology in Canada and support its development (Chapoulie 1996, Helmes-Hayes 2000).

Hughes's sociological prose is original in its avoidance of complex concepts. He never published explicitly theoretical work. However, his essays are analytically dense and he often discusses the task of sociology more broadly. In his preface for The Sociological Eye, first published in 1971 (transaction edition published in 1984), he describes his approach to sociology with reference to C. Wright Mills's phrase the sociological imagination (Hughes 1984, xvi). In his final paragraphs to that preface he outlines his view of sociology and sociological method:

Some say that sociology is a normative science. If they mean that social norms are one of its main objects of study, I agree. If they mean anything else, I do not agree. Many branches of human learning have suffered from taking norms too seriously. Departments of language in universities are often so normative that they kill and pin up their delicate moth of poetry and stuff their beasts of powerful living profes before letting students examine them. Language, as living communication, is one of the promising fields of study; it is not quite the same as the study of languages. Men constantly make and break norms; there is never a moment when the norms are fixed and unchanging. If they do appear to remain unchanged for some time in some place, that, too, is to be accounted for as much as change itself. Certainly, I have never sat down to write systematically about how to study society. I am suspicious of any method said to be the one and only. But among the methods I should recommend is the intensive, penetrating look with an imagination as lively and as sociological as it can be made. One of my basic assumptions is that if one quite clearly sees something happen once, it is almost certain to have happened again and again. The burden of proof is on those who claim a thing once seen is an exception; if they look hard, they may find it everywhere, although with some interesting differences in each case. (Hughes 1984, xviii-xix).

== Biography ==
Born in Beaver, Ohio, Hughes was son of a Methodist minister who came from a family of farmers. He was the third son, and recalled sitting on his father's lap and watching the family's interactions: the basis for his later work. After studying Latin, French and German at Ohio Wesleyan University, Hughes left for Chicago in 1917. For five years he worked teaching English to a mixed population of immigrants (Coser 1994). In 1923 he enrolled in the University of Chicago Department of Sociology and Anthropology, but continued working as public park director, a job that again put him in contact with immigrant communities (Chapoulie 1996). He was married to Canadian sociologist Helen MacGill Hughes, whom he met when they had both been PhD students in Chicago. They had two daughters. In addition to some independent research, Helen MacGill Hughes took part in several of Hughes's studies and also worked as managing editor for American Journal of Sociology from 1944 to 1961 (Abbott 1999). Five weeks past his 86th birthday, Everett Hughes died of Alzheimer's disease at the Mount Auburn Hospital in Cambridge, Massachusetts, where he had lived.

== Academic career ==
Hughes studied at the University of Chicago under Robert Ezra Park, Ernest W. Burgess, Ellsworth Faris, Robert Redfield, Ruth Shonle Cavan, Nels Anderson, and other noted scholars, of whom he considered Park as his primary mentor (Chapoulie 1996). He defended his thesis, entitled The Growth of an Institution: The Chicago Real Estate Board in 1928. After his graduation he took a job at McGill University, where he, together with Carl Dawson, had the task to develop the sociology department at a time when it still was in its infancy. In Canada Hughes is recognized as one of the central figures of early Canadian sociology (Helmes-Hayes 2000).

Hughes is, however, more commonly associated with the Chicago school, as he returned to the University of Chicago in 1938 and became a core figure at its sociology department (Abbott 1999). He is recognized as either teacher or mentor to numerous well-known scholars associated with the Chicago tradition of qualitative, interactionist sociology, including Howard S. Becker, Erving Goffman, Anselm Strauss and Eliot Freidson (Chapoulie 1996). In the late 1950s, the research style that Hughes represented withered in Chicago (Abbott 1999) and in 1961, Hughes accepted a position as professor of sociology at Brandeis University, where he helped to found the school's Graduate Department of Sociology. Under Hughes's influence, the Chicago tradition of fieldwork-oriented interactionism continued in Brandeis, where scholars such as Irving Kenneth Zola came to be "changed forever" (Conrad et al. 1995). In 1968, he left Brandeis University for Boston College (Chapoulie 1996).

During the years 1952 to 1961 Hughes served as editor to the American Journal of Sociology during an era when the journal remained closely linked to the University of Chicago and its sociology department. During Hughes' era, the journal was traditional in the sense that double-blind review was not applied. When this was implemented in 1961 after Hughes' resignation, he strongly opposed what he perceived as a project of making sociological research appear as disembodied and detached from the social context where it was carried out (Abbott 1999, 146–147). In a letter to Peter Blau who had taken over editorship from him Hughes expressed his view as follows:

A given piece of a man's work has to be judged not merely by itself but as one item in his complete or growing production (...) and a man's ongoing work is by the nature of the case a very personal product and by no means anonymous (quoted in Abbott 1999, 146–147).

In 1963, Hughes was elected by his peers to serve as the 53rd President of the American Sociological Association. His Presidential Address, entitled Race Relations and the Sociological Imagination, was delivered on August 28, 1963, at the Association's Annual Meeting in Los Angeles. This address was later published in the December 1963 issue of American Sociological Review (ASR Vol. 28 No. 6 pp 879–890). In 1964, he was elected a member of the American Academy of Arts and Sciences. In 1966, he received an honorary doctorate from Sir George Williams University, which later became Concordia University. In 1974, he was awarded the Malinowski Award (see external links).The American Sociological Association, also cited him in 1982 for his contributions to education. His contributions to the training of sociologists during his time in McGill and in Chicago are well-known (Chapoulie 1996, Helmes-Hayes 1998, 2000, Abbott 1999), but his mentorship and teaching at Brandeis are also acclaimed (Homstrom 1984, Conrad et al. 1995, Weiss 1996). Indeed, he still advised students at Boston College when he was in his late seventies (Manning 2000).

== Published works ==
- 1943, French Canada in Transition
- 1956, The "Gleichschaltung" of the German Statistical Yearbook: A Case in Professional Neutrality The American Statistician Vol. IX (December, 1955), pp. 8–11.
- 1958, Men and Their Work
- 1962, Good People and Dirty Work article published in Social Problems, vol. X, Summer, 1962.
- 1971, The Sociological Eye. Selected Papers.
- 1979, The Chicago Real Estate Board: The Growth of an Institution (doctoral thesis, defended in 1928)
- 1960, Junker, Buford Helmholz, and Everett C. Hughes. Field work: An introduction to the social sciences. University of Chicago Press.
- 1984, The Sociological Eye. Selected Papers. Transaction Edition, with a new introduction by David Riesman and Howard S. Becker.
- 1994, On Work, Race, and the Sociological Imagination. Edited and with an Introduction by Lewis A. Coser. The University of Chicago Press, Chicago and London.
- 2002, The place of field work in social science. In: Darin. Weinberg (ed.) Qualitative Research Methods. Malden: Blackwell Publishers, pp. 139–147.
- 1952, with Helen McGill Hughes, Where Peoples Meet: Racial and Ethnic Frontiers
- 1961, with Howard S. Becker, Blanche Geer and Anselm L. Strauss, Boys in White. Student Culture in Medical School

== See also ==
- Bronislaw Malinowski Award
