= Elsie MacGill =

Canadian engineer (1905–1980)

Elsie MacGill OC
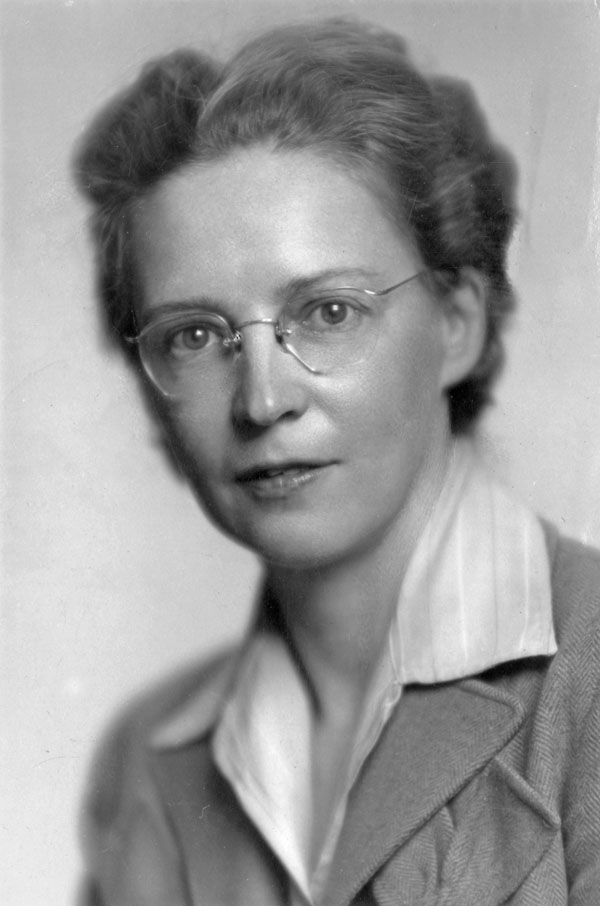
- MacGill during her CC&F years
- Born: March 27, 1905; Vancouver, British Columbia, Canada
- Died: November 4, 1980 (aged 75); Cambridge, Massachusetts, US
- Other name: Queen of the Hurricanes
- Education: Bachelor of Applied Science in Engineering, University of Toronto (1927); Master of Science in Engineering (aeronautics), University of Michigan (1929); Doctoral studies at MIT in Cambridge (1932–1934)
- Occupations: Aeronautical engineer; aircraft designer; women's advocate; author
- Board member of: Engineering Institute of Canada, United Nations Stress Analysis Committee, Royal Commission on the Status of Women in Canada
- Spouse: E. J. (Bill) Soulsby (m. 1943)
- Children: 2 stepchildren
- Parents: James Henry MacGill (father); Helen Gregory MacGill (mother)
- Relatives: Helen MacGill Hughes (sister)
- Engineering career
- Projects: Mass production of the Hawker Hurricane fighter aircraft during WWII, de-icing controls and winter operation adaptations
- Awards: Canada's Aviation Hall of Fame, Canadian Science and Engineering Hall of Fame, Canadian Centennial Medal,

Elizabeth Muriel Gregory MacGill OC (March 27, 1905 – November 4, 1980), known as the "Queen of the Hurricanes", was a Canadian engineer. She was chief aeronautical engineer at Canadian Car and Foundry (CC&F) in Fort William, Ontario during the Second World War. There she oversaw manufacturing of 1,451 Hawker Hurricane fighter aircraft for the Royal Canadian Air Force and the British Royal Air Force, then 835 Curtiss Helldivers for the U.S. Navy, which contributed greatly to the war effort and did much to make Canada a powerhouse of aircraft manufacturing. After her work at CC&F, she ran a successful aeronautical engineering consulting business. Between 1967 and 1970, she was a commissioner on the Royal Commission on the Status of Women in Canada, which published a report in 1970.

== Early life and education ==
MacGill was born in Vancouver on March 27, 1905, youngest daughter of James Henry MacGill, a prominent Vancouver lawyer, part-time journalist, and Anglican deacon, and Helen Gregory MacGill, a journalist and British Columbia's first woman judge. She had two older stepbrothers from her mother's first marriage, and an older sister with whom she was very close.

In the early years, the MacGill children were home-schooled in a formal setting to mimic that of Lord Roberts, the public school that the older boys attended. This included drawing lessons with Emily Carr, and swimming lessons with Joe Fortes. They later attended King George Secondary School, which was affiliated with McGill University. This rigorous education facilitated Elsie's entrance to the University of British Columbia when she was 16. She was admitted to the Applied Sciences program, but the Dean of the Faculty asked her to leave after only one term.

When MacGill was 12 years old, her mother was appointed judge of the juvenile court of Vancouver. After 1911, racial strife in British Columbia continued to escalate, and Jim MacGill's immigration-related legal work was directly impacted. This caused severe financial strain for the family during the war years. Her early aptitude for "fixing things" stood the family in good stead, and informed discussions of possible careers.

MacGill's mother was an advocate of women's suffrage and influenced Elsie's decision to study engineering.

My presence in the University of Toronto's engineering classes in 1923 certainly turned a few heads.
Although I never learned to fly myself, I accompanied the pilots on all test flights – even the dangerous first flight – of any aircraft I worked on.

— Elsie MacGill, 1940,

MacGill was admitted to the University of Toronto's Bachelor of Applied Sciences program in 1923. During the summers she worked in machine shops repairing electrical motors to supplement the theory and practical teachings during the school year. It is also here that she became exposed to the nascent field of aeronautical engineering. Contracting polio just before her graduation, MacGill was told that she would probably spend the rest of her life in a wheelchair. She refused to accept that possibility though, and learned to walk supported by two metal canes. Elsie graduated from the University of Toronto in 1927, the first Canadian woman to earn a degree in electrical engineering.

After graduating, MacGill took a junior job with Austin Aircraft Company in Pontiac, Michigan, which furthered her interest in aeronautics. She also began part-time graduate studies in aeronautical engineering at the University of Michigan, enrolling in the fall of 1927 in the full-time Master of Science in Engineering program to begin aircraft design work and conduct research and development in the university's new aeronautics facilities. In 1929, she became the first woman in North America, and perhaps the world, to be awarded a master's degree in aeronautical engineering.

She pursued PhD studies at MIT in Cambridge from 1932–34. In order to help finance her doctoral studies, MacGill wrote magazine articles about aircraft and flying. Her contemporary at MIT was aeronautical engineer and technical writer, M. Elsa Gardner.

== Career ==
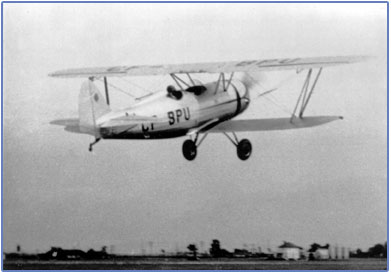
The Maple Leaf Trainer II, designed by Elsie MacGill

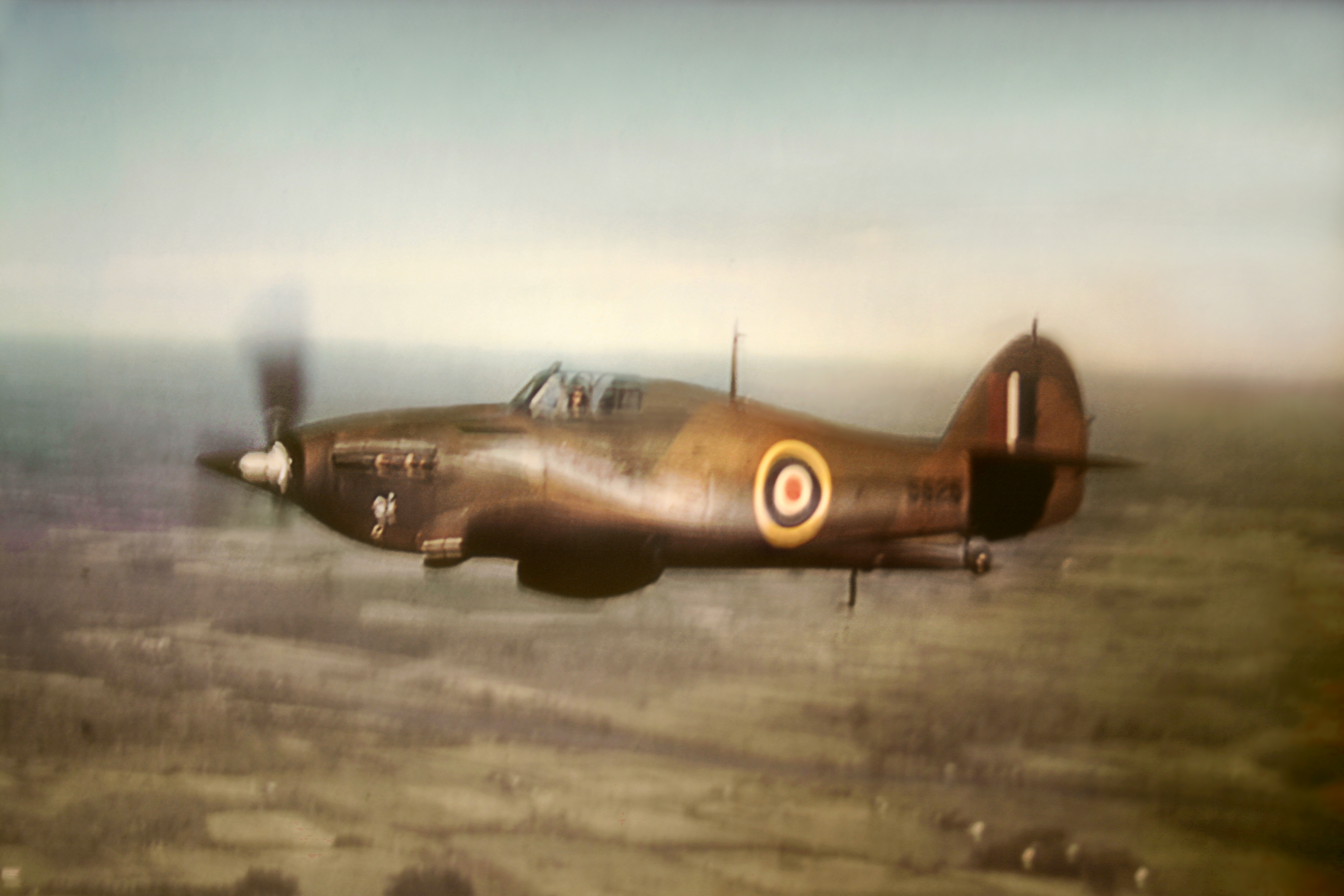
CC&F Hawker Hurricane X on a test flight over Fort William, Ontario

In 1934, MacGill started work at Fairchild Aircraft's operations in Longueuil as an assistant aeronautical engineer. She contributed to various aviation projects including the Fairchild Super 71 (the first aircraft designed and built in Canada featuring a metal fuselage), the Fairchild 82 (a bush plane), and the Fairchild Sekani (twin-engined transport aircraft). She presented a paper, "Simplified Performance Calculations for Aeroplanes", to the Royal Aeronautical Society in Ottawa, on March 22, 1938, to high praise. It was later published in The Engineering Journal. She also participated in the Canadian Broadcasting Corporation's six-part series, The Engineer in War Time; her segment was called "Aircraft Engineering in Wartime Canada". In 1942, she was elected to the position of chairman of the EIC, Lakehead Branch, after having also served as their vice-chairman.

Later that year MacGill was hired as Chief Aeronautical Engineer at Canadian Car and Foundry (CanCar). There she designed and tested a new training aircraft, the Maple Leaf Trainer II.

The Maple Leaf Trainer was designed and first built in CanCar's Fort William (now Thunder Bay) factories, where MacGill had moved. Although the Maple Leaf II did not enter service with any Commonwealth forces, ten (two were completed, but eight had to be assembled in Mexico) were sold to Mexico where its high-altitude performance was important, given the many airfields from which it had to operate. Her role in the company changed when the factory was selected to build the Hawker Hurricane fighter aircraft for the Royal Air Force (RAF). The factory had to be quickly expanded from about 500 workers to 4,500 by war's end, half of them women. McGill was responsible for tooling up production for more than 25,000 precision parts; the parts had to be interchangeable with Hurricanes manufactured in the U.K. For much of the war MacGill's primary task was to set up and streamline operations in the production line as the factories rapidly expanded. This involved designing and adapting machine tools to enable quantity manufacturing to exacting specifications. She was also responsible for designing solutions to allow the aircraft to operate during the winter, introducing de-icing controls and a system for fitting skis for landing on snow.

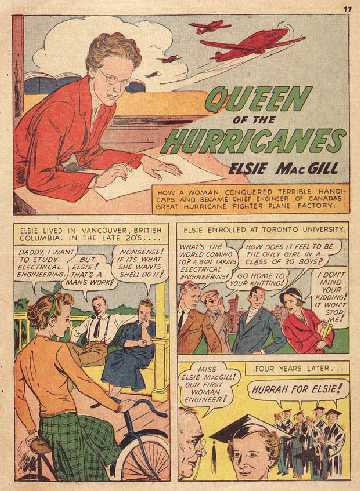
Elsie MacGill portrayed as "The Queen of the Hurricanes."

By the time the production line shut down in 1943, CanCar had produced 1,451 Hurricanes. In 1940 she wrote and presented a paper on the experience, "Factors Affecting Mass Production of Aeroplanes", later published in The Engineering Journal . Her role in this successful production run made her famous, to the point of having a comic book biography appear in an issue of True Comics in 1942, using her nickname, "Queen of the Hurricanes”. Numerous popular stories were published about her in the media as well, reflecting the public's fascination with this woman engineer.

After Hurricane production ended, CanCar looked for new work and secured a contract from the United States Navy to build Curtiss SB2C Helldivers. Again MacGill was responsible for all engineering and production work, and the plant ultimately produced 835 aircraft, significantly contributing to Allied air power. This production did not go nearly as smoothly, and a continual stream of minor changes from Curtiss-Wright (in turn demanded by the U.S. Navy) meant that full-scale production took a long time to get started.

MacGill moved to Toronto, where she set up an aeronautical engineering consulting business with Bill Soulsby in 1943. In 1946, she became a Technical Adviser for International Civil Aviation Organization (ICAO), where she helped to draft International Air Worthiness regulations for the design and production of commercial aircraft. In 1947 she became the chairman of the United Nations Stress Analysis Committee, the first woman ever to chair a U.N. committee.

In 1952, MacGill presented a paper to the Society of Women Engineers (SWE) conference, "The Initiative in Airliner Design", that was subsequently published in The Engineering Journal. A year later SWE awarded her their annual Achievement Award.

== Advocacy ==
After breaking her leg in 1953, MacGill used the opportunity of her months of convalescence to sort through her mother's papers and begin writing a biography of her mother's life. MacGill published the book, My Mother, the Judge: A Biography of Judge Helen Gregory MacGill, in 1955. The active public service and work of her mother and grandmother in the suffrage movement inspired Elsie to spend more time dealing with women's rights in the 1960s.

MacGill served as President of the Canadian Federation of Business and Professional Women's Clubs from 1962 to 1964. In 1967 she was named to the Royal Commission on the Status of Women in Canada and co-authored the report published in 1970. She also filed a "Separate Statement" describing those of her opinions which differed from the majority on the commission. For example, she wanted abortion removed from the entirety of the Criminal Code.

MacGill was also a member of the Ontario Status of Women Committee, an affiliate of the National Action Committee on the Status of Women. For this work she was given the Order of Canada in 1971.

MacGill once said:

"I have received many engineering awards, but I hope I will also be remembered as an advocate for the rights of women and children."

— Elsie MacGill,

== Personal life ==
Elsie MacGill married E.J. "Bill" Soulsby in 1943 and the couple moved to Toronto, where they began their consulting firm.

After a short illness, MacGill died on November 4, 1980, in Cambridge, Massachusetts. In noting her death, Shirley Allen, a Canadian member of the Ninety-Nines organization of women aviators said of her: "She had a brilliant mind and was recognized as an outstanding Canadian woman. Neither gender nor disability prevented her from using her talents to serve her community and country."

== Awards, honours, and legacy ==
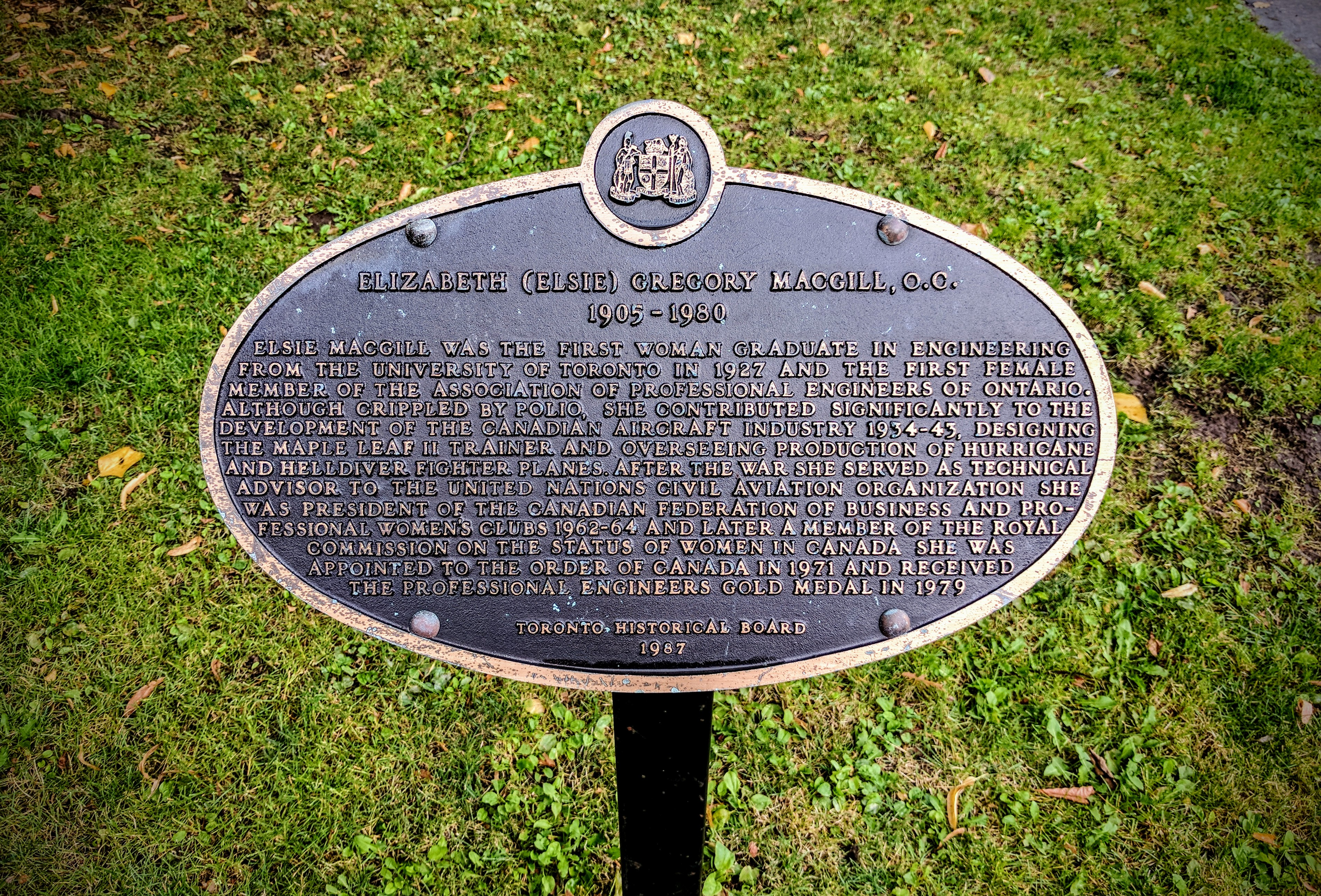
A plaque by the Toronto Historical Board commemorating Elsie MacGill, in front of the Sandford Fleming Building at the University of Toronto.

=== Firsts ===
In 1927, she was the first Canadian woman to earn a bachelors degree in electrical engineering

In 1929, she became the first woman in North America, and perhaps the world, to be awarded a Master's degree in aeronautical engineering.

In 1938, she was the first woman elected to corporate membership in the Engineering Institute of Canada (EIC).

In 1942, MacGill was hired as Chief Aeronautical Engineer at Canadian Car and Foundry (CanCar), becoming the first woman in the world to hold such a position.

In 1946, she became the first woman to serve as Technical Adviser for International Civil Aviation Organization (ICAO).

In 1947, she was named chair of the United Nations Stress Analysis Committee, becoming the first woman ever to chair a United Nations committee.

=== National honours and decorations ===
In 1967, MacGill was awarded the Centennial Medal by the Canadian government.

In 1971, she received the Order of Canada for "services as an aeronautical engineering consultant and as a member of the Royal Commission on the Status of Women."

In 1977, she was awarded the Queens' Silver Jubilee Medal.

=== Academic and scholarly honours ===
In 1973, she received an honorary Doctor of Law degree from the University of Toronto.

In 1976, she received an honorary Doctor of Science degree from the University of Windsor.

In 1978, she received an honorary Doctorate from Queen’s University.

In 1978, she received an honorary Doctorate from York University.

=== Professional engineering awards ===
In 1941, MacGill's paper, Factors Affecting the Mass Production of Aeroplanes, won the Gzowski Medal from the Engineering Institute of Canada.

In 1953, she was one of only 50 people, and the only woman, to have her picture in the exclusive Gevaert Gallery of Canadian Executives to honour her contributions and influence.

In 1953, the Society of Women Engineers (in the U.S.) presented her with its Achievement Award "in recognition of her meritorious contributions to aeronautical engineering," the first time the Award was given outside the United States.

In 1973, she received the Julian Smith Medal from the Engineering Institute of Canada (1973).

In 1975, the Ninety-Nines awarded her the Amelia Earhart Medal in 1975.

In 1979, the Ontario Association of Professional Engineers presented her with their gold medal.

=== Hall of Fame inductions ===
In 1980, she was inducted into the University of Toronto Engineering Hall of Distinction (1980).

In 1983, MacGill was inducted into Canada's Aviation Hall of Fame.

In 1992, she was a founding inductee in the Canadian Science and Engineering Hall of Fame in Ottawa.

In 2012, she was inducted into the Women in Aviation International Pioneer Hall of Fame.

=== Cultural and public recognition ===
In 1999, she was featured in the documentary Rosies of the North (1999).

In 2016, she was short-listed as a finalist for the Bank of Canada series of banknotes honouring iconic Canadian women.

In 2019, MacGill was the honoree of a Canada Post stamp as part of the "Canadians in Flight" series.

In 2019, MacGill was the subject of a biography for young readers, Meet Elsie MacGill, published by Scholastic Canada.

In October 2020, MacGill was the topic of a Heritage Minute short film honouring her achievements in the Second World War.

In 2023, The Royal Canadian Mint created a commemorative circulating loonie entitled "Honouring Elsie MacGill".

=== Named institutions and commemorations ===
École Elsie MacGill Public School, Lakehead District School Board (approved 2019; opened 2020).

Elsie MacGill Secondary School, Halton District School Board (opened 2021).

Royal Canadian Air Cadets squadron renamed "70 'Elsie MacGill' Royal Canadian Air Cadet Squadron" (2022).

Commemorative circulating loonie issued by the Royal Canadian Mint, “Honouring Elsie MacGill” (2023).

== Affiliations ==
=== Affiliations ===
President

- Canadian Federation of Business and Professional Women's Clubs

Commissioner

- Royal Commission on the Status of Women in Canada

Fellow

- Canadian Aeronautical and Space Institute
- Engineering Institute of Canada
- Royal Aeronautical Society (U.K.)
- Royal Society of Arts (U.K.)

Life Member

- Society of Women Engineers

Member

- American Institute of Aeronautics and Astronautics
- Association of Consulting Engineers in Canada
- Association of Professional Engineers in Canada
- Business and Professional Women's Club of Toronto
- Canadian Society of Mechanical Engineers
- Ontario Status of Women Committee (affiliate of the National Action Committee on the Status of Women)
- Toronto Soroptimist Club

Registered / Chartered

- Chartered engineer in the U.K.
- Registered professional engineer in Canada

== See also ==
- Women in warfare (1945-1999)

== Archives ==
There is an Elsie Gregory MacGill fonds at Library and Archives Canada. Archival reference number is R4349. See also Elsie Gregory MacGill fonds at the Archives of Ontario.

There is an archival file at the Society of Women Engineers' archives:
