= Hilda Lyon =

British aeronautical engineer (1896–1946)

Hilda Margaret Lyon
- Born: 31 May 1896; Market Weighton, Yorkshire, England
- Died: 2 December 1946 (aged 50); Surrey, England
- Education: Newnham College, Cambridge
- Engineering career
- Employers: Siddeley-Deasy, George Parnall, Royal Airship Works
- Projects: R101
- Significant design: "Lyon Shape"
- Awards: R38 Memorial Prize

Hilda Margaret Lyon, MA, MSc, AFRAeS (31 May 1896 – 2 December 1946) was a British engineer who invented the "Lyon Shape", a streamlined design used for airships and submarines.

== Early life and education ==
Lyon was born in 1896 in Market Weighton, Yorkshire. She was the youngest daughter of Thomas and Margaret Lyon (née Green); her father was a grocer. Hilda Lyon attended Beverley High School and then in 1915 went to Newnham College, Cambridge, from which she obtained a MA in mathematics.

== Career in aviation ==
After graduating, Lyon took an Air Ministry course in aeroplane stress-analysis and then obtained a job as a technical assistant. She saw no prospect of promotion or more responsibility "for a woman mathematician" in this job, so she and her sister quit their jobs and went to Switzerland for six weeks.

In 1918, Lyon worked as an Aircraft Technical Assistant for Siddeley-Deasy. She moved to George Parnall & Co. in 1920.

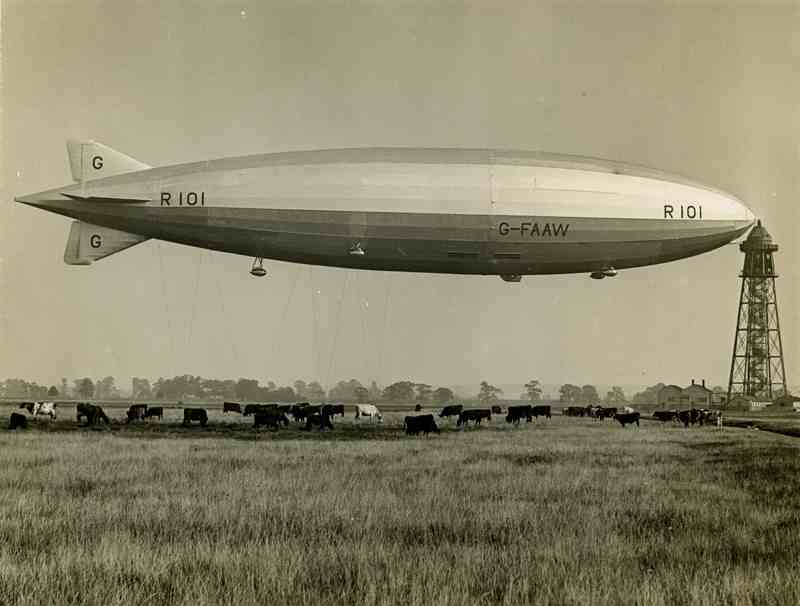
The R101 at Cardington

Around 1922, Lyon was admitted as an Associate Fellow of the Royal Aeronautical Society. From 1925 onwards, she was a member of technical staff at the Royal Airship Works in Cardington, helping to develop the R101 rigid airship through her work on aerodynamics.

In 1930, Lyon was awarded the R38 Memorial Prize by the Royal Aeronautical Society for her paper "The Strength of Transverse Frames of Rigid Airships". It was the first time that any prize of the society had been won by a woman.

Lyon's work involved travel to America, Canada, and Germany. In 1930 she went to America on a Mary Ewart Travelling Scholarship and took up studies at Massachusetts Institute of Technology, where she was first permitted to use a wind tunnel. In 1932, she submitted a thesis on "The Effect of Turbulence on the Drag of Airship Models" to obtain her MSc. After submitting her thesis, Lyon went to Göttingen in Germany, and conducted research at the Kaiser Wilhelm Gesellschaft für Strömungsforschung with Ludwig Prandtl.

After her return to Britain, Lyon spent time at home as a carer, keeping up with her research at the same time by using the libraries of the University of Hull and the University of Leeds and by visiting the National Physical Laboratory and the Royal Aircraft Establishment. During this time, she worked on aeroelastic flutter and elastic blades.

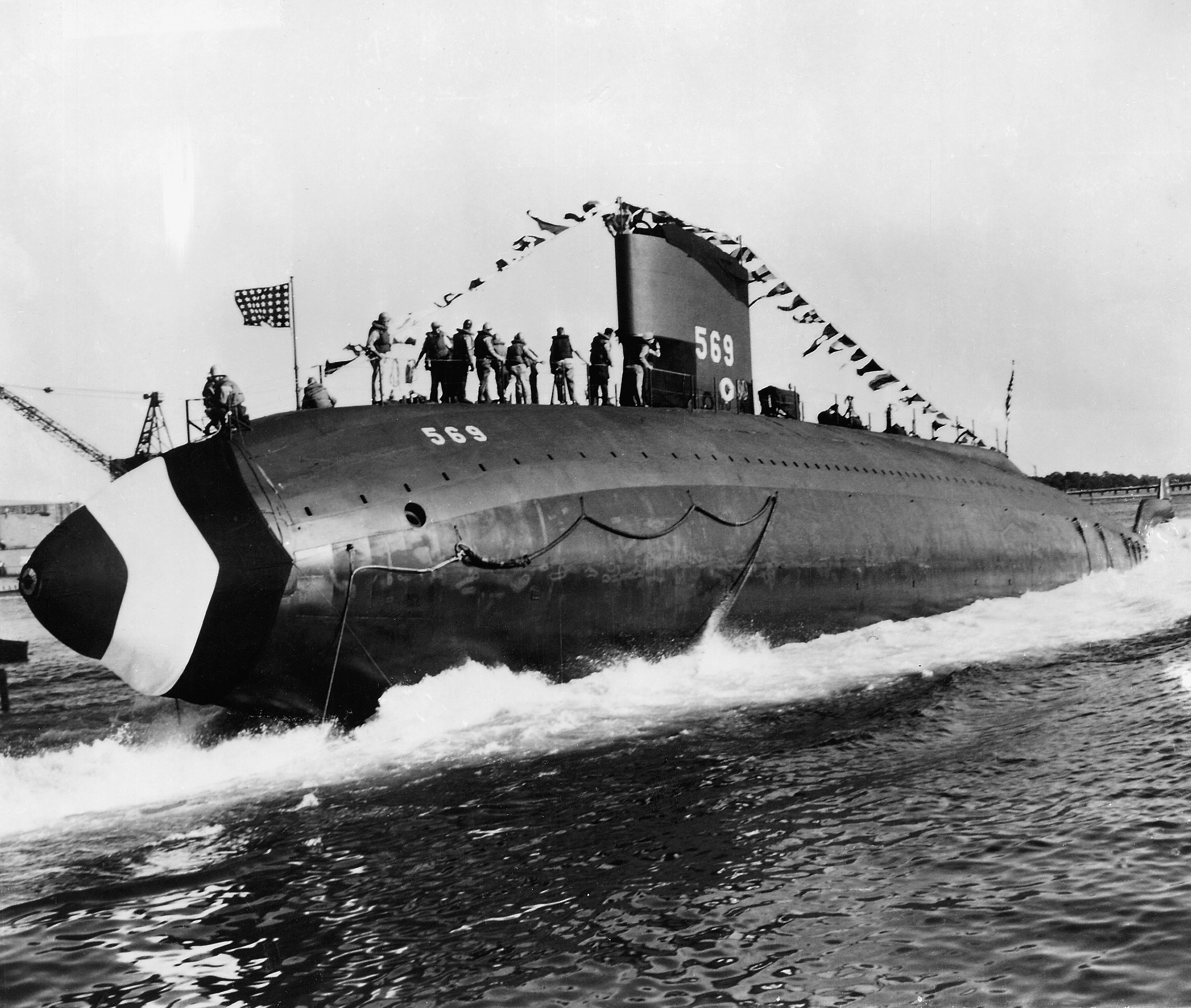
The launch of USS Albacore in 1955

From 1937, Lyon returned to full-time aerodynamic research as a Principal Scientific Officer at the Royal Aircraft Establishment in Farnborough. She first worked in wind tunnels on boundary layer suction, then joined the Stability Section. She later became head of this section, and also served on the Aeronautical Research Council.

Lyon died on 2 December 1946 following an operation. After her death, her research and the "Lyon Shape" which she devised were incorporated into the American submarine USS Albacore, which had the prototype streamlined hull form for almost all subsequent US submarines.

== Commemoration ==
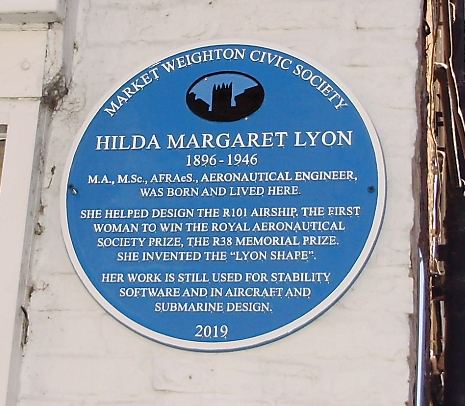
Plaque to Hilda Lyon, in Market Weighton

Lyon's biography was published by the Oxford Dictionary of National Biography on 9 May 2019 as part of their support for the Women's Engineering Society's centenary, and a new book has been published about Hilda's life and work. A blue plaque was installed in Lyon's honour at the site of her father's grocers’ shop (now a Morrisons Daily) in Market Weighton in the East Riding of Yorkshire on Thursday, 27 June 2019.

In 2021, St Mary's Church in Beverley, East Yorkshire announced their intention of installing a stone carving of Hilda Lyon as part of a programme of celebrating women in the restoration of the stonework of the medieval church. The other eight figures include fellow engineer and WES member Amy Johnson, Mary Wollstonecraft, Mary Seacole, Marie Curie, Rosalind Franklin, Helen Sharman and Ada Lovelace.
