= Olive Dennis =

American engineer (1885-1957)

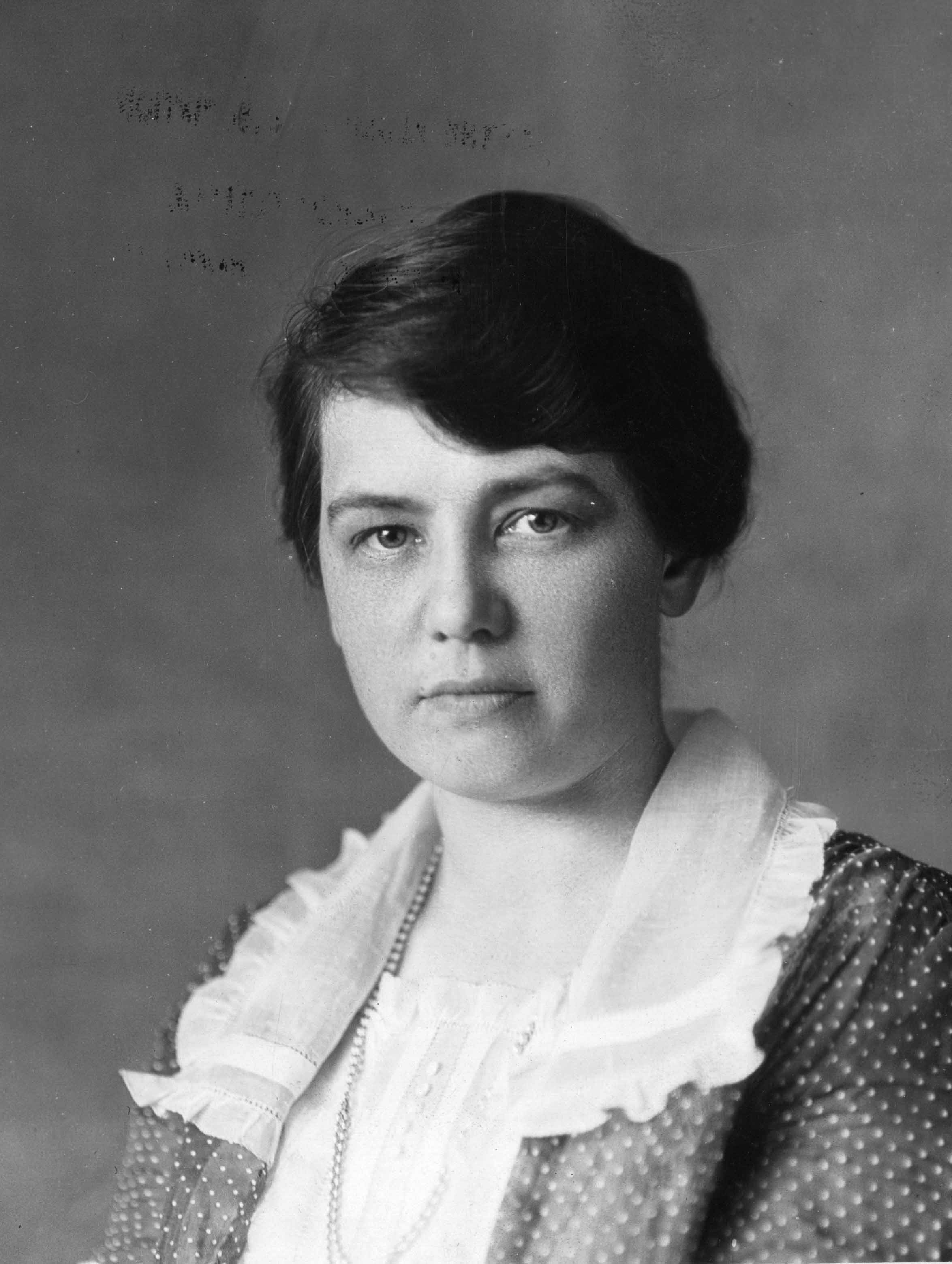
- Born: November 20, 1885; Thurlow, Pennsylvania
- Died: November 5, 1957 (aged 71); Baltimore, Maryland
- Education: Goucher College; Columbia University; Cornell University
- Known for: Railway service improvements
- Scientific career
- Fields: Engineering
- Workplaces: B&O Railroad

Olive Wetzel Dennis (November 20, 1885 – November 5, 1957) was an engineer whose design innovations changed the nature of railway travel. Born in Thurlow, Pennsylvania, she grew up in Baltimore. In 2026, Ms. Dennis was inducted into the National Inventors Hall of Fame.

== Career ==
She earned a Bachelor of Arts degree from Goucher College in 1908, and a master's degree in mathematics from Columbia University the following year. After teaching at Wisconsin, she decided to study civil engineering and studied at Cornell University, earning her degree in only one year. In 1920, she became only the second woman to obtain a Civil Engineering degree from Cornell. She was hired that year as a draftsman by the B & O Railroad to design bridges, the first of which was in Painesville, Ohio. The following year, Daniel Willard, President of the railroad observed that, since half of the railway's passengers were women, the task of engineering upgrades in service would best be handled by a female engineer. Dennis became the first "service engineer" when the B. & O. created the position. Engineer Kurt H. Debus described her as the first service engineer in America. Later on in her career, B. &. O. tasked Dennis with designing an entire train that incorporated all of her innovations. This train, the Cincinnatian, was deemed "the crowning glory of her career" by historian Sharon Harwood. She was also the first female member of the American Railway Engineering Association. She was elected as a member of the British Women's Engineering Society in 1931.

== Innovations ==
Among the innovations that Ms. Dennis introduced on passenger trains were seats that could partially recline; stain-resistant upholstery in passenger cars; larger dressing rooms for women, supplied with free paper towels, liquid soap and drinking cups; ceiling lights that could be dimmed at night; individual window vents (which she patented) to allow passengers to bring in fresh air while trapping dust; and, later, air conditioned compartments. Other rail carriers followed suit in the years that followed, and buses and airlines, in turn, had to upgrade their level of comfort in order to compete with the railroads.

Her legacy for these innovations and comforts goes largely unknown outside of the railroad community. Her design patents were signed over to the railroad and her name does not appear in the publicity materials for the Cincinnatian, despite her designing it.

== Sources ==
- Current Biography 1941 yearbook, pp. 220–221
- Sybil E. Hatch, Changing Our World: True Stories of Women Engineers (ASCE Publications, 2006)
- Marilyn Bailey Ogilvie and Joy Dorothy Harvey, eds., The Biographical Dictionary of Women in Science (Taylor & Francis, 2000)
