= Marie Luhring =

American automotive designer and engineer (1892–1939)

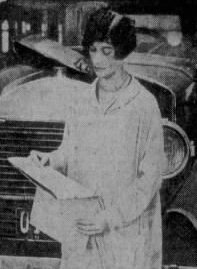
- Portrait of Luhring in a 1926 newspaper
- Born: May 24, 1892; New York City
- Died: December 29, 1939 (aged 47)
- Resting place: Woodlawn Cemetery, New York
- Education: Hunter College, Cooper Union
- Occupation: Automotive engineer
- Known for: Early woman truck designer in United States, first woman associate member of the American Society of Automotive Engineers.

Marie Luhring (May 24, 1892 – December 29, 1939) was an automotive engineer and one of the first female truck designers in the United States. In 1920, she became the first female associate member of the American Society of Automotive Engineers.

== Early life and education ==
Marie Luhring was born on May 24 1892, in New York City. She graduated from Hunter College with a degree in art and interior design. She briefly worked as an animator before beginning her career in engineering.

== Career ==
In 1918, Luhring began working for International Motors Company, along with twenty-six other women, due to a shortage of male engineers during World War I. She worked for the company for the rest of her life, until 1939.

In 1920, Luhring was admitted as an associate member of the American Society of Automotive Engineers (SAE), making her the first female member of the society. Six years later, Ethel H. Bailey became the first woman to be a full member of the SAE.

In the late 1920s, Luhring was involved in the development of a gas-electric locomotive. Her colleagues reportedly called her "a marvelous person, a marvelous worker."

Luhring died in Muhlenberg Hospital on December 29, 1939, after an illness of six months.

== See also ==
- Women in World War I
- Women in engineering in the United States
