= 2015 NATC Motorcycle Trials season =

2015 NATC motorcycle trials season

Seasons
- ← 2014 2016 →

The 2015 NATC trials season was the 42nd season. It consisted of ten trials events in three main classes: Pro, Expert and Women's Expert Sportsman. It began on 11 April, with round one in Amarillo, Texas and ended with round ten in Casper, Wyoming on 8 August.

== Season summary ==
Patrick Smage would claim his eighth NATC Trials Championship in 2015.

== 2015 NATC trials season calendar ==
Round	Date	Trial	Venue	Pro class	Expert class	Women's ES West	Women's ES East
1	11 April	Texas	Amarillo	1) Patrick Smage; 2) Cody Webb; 3) Andrew Putt	1) Quinn Wentzel; 2) Ty Cullins; 3) Andrew Oldar	1) Rachel Hassler; 2) Madeleine Hoover; 3) Caroline Altman	
2	12 April	Texas	Amarillo	1) Patrick Smage; 2) Bryan Roper; 3) Cody Webb	1) Quinn Wentzel; 2) Andrew Oldar; 3) Aaron Thistle	1) Madeleine Hoover; 2) Rachel Hassler	
3	18 April	Arizona	Kingman	1) Patrick Smage; 2) Bryan Roper; 3) Andrew Putt	1) Andrew Oldar; 2) Quinn Wentzel; 3) Ty Cullins	1) Rachel Hassler; 2) Madeleine Hoover; 3) Caroline Altman	
4	19 April	Arizona	Kingman	1) Patrick Smage; 2) Cody Webb; 3) Bryan Roper	1) Andrew Oldar; 2) Quinn Wentzel; 3) Harrison Oswald	1) Rachel Hassler; 2) Madeleine Hoover; 3) Caroline Altman	
5	13 June	Nebraska	Nehawka	1) Patrick Smage; 2) Andrew Putt; 3) Bryan Roper	1) Drew Fortner; 2) Jerome Gregorowicz; 3) Quinn Wentzel		1) Madeleine Hoover; 2)Caroline Allen; 3) Rachel Hassler
6	14 June	Nebraska	Nehawka	1) Patrick Smage; 2) Andrew Putt; 3) Bryan Roper	1) Drew Fortner; 2) Andrew Oldar; 3) Quinn Wentzel		1) Madeleine Hoover; 2)Caroline Allen; 3) Rachel Hassler
7	20 June	Ohio	Toronto	1) Patrick Smage; 2) Cody Webb; 3) Andrew Putt	1) Quinn Wentzel; 2) Andreas Niederer; 3) Drew Fortner		1) Rachel Hassler; 2) Madeleine Hoover; 3) Caroline Allen
8	21 June	Ohio	Toronto	1) Patrick Smage; 2) Andrew Putt; 3) Bryan Roper	1) Quinn Wentzel; 2) Andreas Niederer; 3) Jerome Gregorowicz		1) Caroline Allen; 2) Rachel Hassler; 3) Madeleine Hoover
9	8 August	Wyoming	Casper	1) Andrew Putt; 2) Daniel Blanc-Gonnet; 3) Cody Webb	1) Aaron Thistle; 2) Drew Fortner; 3) Andrew Oldar	1) Rachel Hassler; 2) Christy Williams; 3) Madeleine Hoover	
10	9 August	Wyoming	Casper	1) Andrew Putt; 2) Cody Webb; 3) Daniel Blanc-Gonnet	1) Andreas Niederer; 2) Drew Fortner; 3) Aaron Thistle	1) Madeleine Hoover; 2) Rachel Hassler; 3) Christy Williams	

=== Scoring system ===
Points were awarded to the top twenty finishers in each class. The best of nine rounds counted for the Pro class and the Expert class, the best five in Women's Expert Sportsman West and the best three in the Women's Expert Sportsman East class.

Position	1st	2nd	3rd	4th	5th	6th	7th	8th	9th	10th	11th	12th	13th	14th	15th	16th	17th	18th	19th	20th
Points	30	25	21	18	16	15	14	13	12	11	10	9	8	7	6	5	4	3	2	1

=== NATC Pro final standings ===
Pos	Rider	Machine	TX (Texas)	TX (Texas)	AZ (Arizona)	AZ (Arizona)	NE (Nebraska)	NE (Nebraska)	OH (Ohio)	OH (Ohio)	WY (Wyoming)	WY (Wyoming)	Pts	Notes
1	(United States) Patrick Smage	Sherco	1	1	1	1	1	1	1	1	-	-	240	2014 NATC Champion
2	(United States) Andrew Putt	Sherco	3	4	3	4	2	2	3	2	1	1	216 (234)	
3	(United States) Bryan Roper	Sherco	4	2	2	3	3	3	4	3	-	-	170	
4	(United States) Cody Webb	Montesa	2	3	4	2	-	-	2	-	3	2	160	
5	(United States) Logan Bolopue	Sherco	6	5	5	5	4	6	5	5	4	4	149 (164)	
6	(Austria) Alexander Niederer	Gas Gas	5	6	6	6	6	4	6	4	5	5	144 (159)	
7	(United States) Daniel Blanc-Gonnet	Sherco	-	-	-	-	5	5	-	-	2	3	78	
8	(United States) Shad Petersen	Beta	7	7	-	-	-	-	-	-	6	7	57	
9	(United States) Quinn Wentzel	Scorpa	-	-	-	-	-	-	-	-	-	6	15	2015 Expert Champion

=== NATC Expert final standings ===
Pos	Rider	Machine	TX (Texas)	TX (Texas)	AZ (Arizona)	AZ (Arizona)	NE (Nebraska)	NE (Nebraska)	OH (Ohio)	OH (Ohio)	WY (Wyoming)	WY (Wyoming)	Pts	Notes
1	(United States) Quinn Wentzel	Scorpa	1	1	2	2	3	3	1	1	4	-	230	
2	(United States) Andrew Oldar	Montesa	3	2	1	1	8	2	8	6	3	6	195 (208)	
3	(United States) Drew Fortner	Gas Gas	5	6	5	4	1	1	3	5	2	2	197 (212)	
4	(Austria) Andreas Niederer	Beta	6	7	6	7	4	8	2	2	5	1	172 (185)	
5	(United States) Aaron Thistle	Sherco	4	3	7	6	5	4	5	7	1	3	169 (183)	
6	(United States) Ty Cullins	Beta	2	5	3	5	6	6	6	4	-	-	141	2014 Expert 125 champion
7	(United States) Rick Johnson	Gas Gas	8	8	8	8	10	9	11	13	7	7	113 (121)	
8	(United States) Harrison Oswald	Jota	7	4	4	3	-	-	-	-	6	4	104	
9	(United States) Alan Shirley	Gas Gas	9	9	10	9	11	13	14	12	-	-	81	
10	(United States) Jerome Gregorowicz	Gas Gas	-	-	-	-	2	5	4	3	-	-	80	
11	(United States) Jordi Trey	Sherco	-	-	-	-	12	11	13	9	8	5	68	
12	(United States) Nick Fonzi	Beta	-	-	-	-	7	7	12	8	-	-	50	
13	(United States) Cody Bradon	Beta	-	-	-	-	9	10	10	10	-	-	45	
14	(United States) Brian Stull	Gas Gas	-	-	9	10	-	-	-	-	-	-	23	
15	(Canada) Jonathan English	Beta	-	-	-	-	-	-	9	11	-	-	22	
16	(United States) Nate Hirt	Sherco	-	-	-	-	13	12	-	-	-	-	17	
17	(United States) Travis Fox	Gas Gas	-	-	-	-	-	-	7	-	-	-	14	

=== NATC Women's Expert Sportsman West final standings ===
Pos	Rider	Machine	TX (Texas)	TX (Texas)	AZ (Arizona)	AZ (Arizona)	WY (Wyoming)	WY (Wyoming)	Pts	Notes
1	(United States) Rachel Hassler	Gas Gas	1	2	1	1	1	2	145 (170)	2014 Women's Expert Sportman champion
2	(United States) Madeleine Hoover	Gas Gas	2	1	2	2	3	1	135 (165)	2014 Women's Champion
3	(United States) Caroline Altman	Gas Gas	3	-	3	3	-	-	63	
4	(Canada) Christy Williams	Montesa	-	-	-	-	2	3	46	
5	(United States) Madison Leigh	Sherco	-	-	-	-	-	4	18	

=== NATC Women's Expert Sportsman East final standings ===
Pos	Rider	Machine	NE (Nebraska)	NE (Nebraska)	OH (Ohio)	OH (Ohio)	Pts	Notes
1	(United States) Madeleine Hoover	Gas Gas	1	1	2	3	85 (106)	
2	(United States) Caroline Allen	Gas Gas	2	2	3	1	80 (101)	
3	(United States) Rachel Hassler	Gas Gas	3	3	1	2	76 (97)	
4	(United States) Caroline Altman	Gas Gas	-	-	4	5	34	
5	(United States) Madison Leigh	Sherco	-	-	-	4	18	
