= 2016 NATC Motorcycle Trials season =

2016 NATC motorcycle trials season

Seasons
- ← 2015 2017 →

The 2016 NATC trials season was the 43rd season. It consisted of eight trials events in four main classes: Pro, Expert and Women's Expert Sportsman West and East. It began on 21 May, with round one in Florida and ended with round eight in Colorado on 26 June.

== Season summary ==
Spaniard Marc Friexa would claim his first NATC Trials Championship in 2016.

== 2016 NATC trials season calendar ==
Round	Date	Trial	Venue	Pro class	Expert class	East Women's Expert Sportsman	West Women's Expert Sportsman
1	21 May	Florida	Ocala	1) Patrick Smage; 2) Marc Freixa; 3) Andrew Putt	1) Ray Peters; 2) Andreas Niederer; 3) Aaron Thistle	1) Rachel Hassler; 2) Madeleine Hoover; 3) Christy Williams	
2	22 May	Florida	Ocala	1) Marc Freixa; 2) Patrick Smage; 3) Andrew Putt	1) Ray Peters; 2) Andreas Niederer; 3) Sam Meyerpeter	1) Christy Williams; 2) Madeleine Hoover; 3) Rachel Hassler	
3	28 May	Tennessee	Sequatchie	1) Patrick Smage; 2) Marc Freixa; 3) Andrew Putt	1) Aaron Thistle; 2) Andreas Niederer; 3) Randy Gibson	1) Christy Williams; 2) Rachel Hassler; 3) Madeleine Hoover	
4	29 May	Tennessee	Sequatchie	1) Marc Freixa; 2) Patrick Smage; 3) Andrew Putt	1) Andreas Niederer; 2) Aaron Thistle; 3) Jerome Gregorowicz	1) Rachel Hassler; 2) Christy Williams; 3) Madeleine Hoover	
5	18 June	Oregon	Tillamook	1) Marc Freixa; 2) Patrick Smage; 3) Andrew Putt	1) Aaron Thistle; 2) Andreas Niederer; 3) Alex Walton		1) Christy Williams; 2) Madeleine Hoover; 3) Kylee Sweeten
6	19 June	Oregon	Tillamook	1) Marc Freixa; 2) Patrick Smage; 3) Andrew Putt	1) Andreas Niederer; 2) Aaron Thistle; 3) Alex Walton		1) Christy Williams; 2) Rachel Hassler; 3) Madeleine Hoover
7	25 June	Colorado	Canon City	1) Marc Freixa; 2) Andrew Putt; 3) Patrick Smage	1) Andreas Niederer; 2) Drew Fortner; 3) Aaron Thistle		1) Christy Williams; 2) Madeleine Hoover; 3) Rachel Hassler
8	26 June	Colorado	Canon City	1) Marc Freixa; 2) Patrick Smage; 3) Andrew Putt	1) Andreas Niederer; 2) Drew Fortner; 3) Aaron Thistle		1) Christy Williams; 2) Madeleine Hoover; 3) Rachel Hassler

=== Scoring system ===
Points were awarded to the top twenty finishers in each class. All eight rounds counted for the Pro class and Expert class, and the best of three in the Women's East and West classes were counted.

Position	1st	2nd	3rd	4th	5th	6th	7th	8th	9th	10th	11th	12th	13th	14th	15th	16th	17th	18th	19th	20th
Points	30	25	21	18	16	15	14	13	12	11	10	9	8	7	6	5	4	3	2	1

=== NATC Pro final standings ===
Pos	Rider	Machine	FL (Florida)	FL (Florida)	TN (Tennessee)	TN (Tennessee)	OR (Oregon)	OR (Oregon)	CO (Colorado)	CO (Colorado)	Pts	Notes
1	(Spain) Marc Freixa	Montesa	2	1	2	1	1	1	1	1	230	
2	(United States) Patrick Smage	Sherco	1	2	1	2	2	2	3	2	206	2015 NATC Pro Champion
3	(United States) Andrew Putt	Sherco	3	3	3	3	3	3	2	3	172	
4	(Austria) Alexander Niederer	Gas Gas	4	7	6	5	4	6	4	5	130	
5	(United States) Logan Bolopue	Sherco	6	5	5	7	7	4	7	7	121	
6	(United States) Karl Davis Jr	Scorpa	5	4	4	4	-	5	5	4	120	
7	(United States) Daniel Blanc-Gonnet	Montesa	7	6	8	8	5	8	6	6	114	
8	(United States) Samuel Fastle	Sherco	8	8	7	6	6	7	8	8	110	
9	(United States) Quinn Wentzel	Scorpa	9	9	9	-	8	-	-	-	49	2015 NATC Expert Champion

=== NATC Expert final standings ===
Pos	Rider	Machine	FL (Florida)	FL (Florida)	TN (Tennessee)	TN (Tennessee)	OR (Oregon)	OR (Oregon)	CO (Colorado)	CO (Colorado)	Pts	Notes
1	(Austria) Andreas Niederer	Beta	2	2	2	1	2	1	1	1	220	
2	(United States) Aaron Thistle	Sherco	3	6	1	2	1	2	3	3	188	
3	(United States) Randy Gibson	Sherco	4	5	3	4	4	4	4	4	145	2015 NATC West High School Champion
4	(United States) Sam Meyerpeter	Sherco	5	3	6	5	6	5	6	6	129	2015 NATC Expert 125 Champion
5	(United States) Brandon Wheeler	Sherco	7	8	8	7	7	6	7	7	111	
6	(United States) Drew Fortner	Gas Gas	-	-	5	6	-	-	2	2	81	
7	(United States) Alan Shirley	Gas Gas	8	7	9	9	5	7	-	-	81	
8	(United States) Nick Fonzi	Montesa	4	6	7	8	-	-	-	-	60	
9	(United States) Ray Peters	Beta	1	1	-	-	-	-	-	-	60	
10	(Canada) Alex Walton	Beta	-	-	-	-	3	3	-	-	42	
11	(United States) Jerome Gregorowicz	Gas Gas	-	-	4	3	-	-	-	-	39	
12	(United States) Micah Hertrich	Gas Gas	-	-	-	-	-	-	5	5	32	2015 NATC West Junior Champion

=== NATC East Women's Expert Sportsman final standings ===
Pos	Rider	Machine	FL (Florida)	FL (Florida)	TN (Tennessee)	TN (Tennessee)	Pts	Notes
1	(United States) Rachel Hassler	Gas Gas	1	3	2	1	85 (106)	2015 NATC West Women's Expert Sportsman Champion
2	(Canada) Christy Williams	Montesa	3	1	1	2	85 (106)	
3	(United States) Madeleine Hoover	Gas Gas	2	2	3	3	71 (92)	2015 NATC East Women's Expert Sportsman Champion
4	(United States) Madison Leigh	Scorpa	5	5	4	5	50 (66)	2015 NATC East & West Women's Champion
5	(United States) Caroline Allen	Gas Gas	4	4	-	-	36	
6	(United States) Caroline Altman	Gas Gas	6	6	-	-	30	
7	(United States) Kylee Sweeten	Sherco	-	-	-	4	18	

=== NATC West Women's Expert Sportsman final standings ===
Pos	Rider	Machine	OR (Oregon)	OR (Oregon)	CO (Colorado)	CO (Colorado)	Pts	Notes
1	(Canada) Christy Williams	Montesa	1	1	1	1	90 (120)	
2	(United States) Madeleine Hoover	Gas Gas	2	3	2	2	75 (96)	2015 NATC East Women's Expert Sportsman Champion
3	(United States) Rachel Hassler	Gas Gas	4	2	3	3	67 (85)	2015 NATC West Women's Expert Sportsman Champion
4	(United States) Kylee Sweeten	Sherco	3	4	4	4	57 (75)	
5	(United States) Madison Leigh	Scorpa	5	5	5	5	48 (64)	2015 NATC East & West Women's Champion
