= 2018 NATC Motorcycle Trials season =

Motorcycling competition event

The 2018 NATC trials season was the 45th season. It consisted of ten trials events in three main classes: Pro, Expert and Women's Pro. It began on 21 April, with round one in New Mexico and ended with round ten in California on 2 September.

== Season summary ==
Patrick Smage would claim his tenth NATC Trials Championship in 2018.

Josh Roper would claim his first NATC Trials Championship Expert class title in 2018.

== 2018 NATC trials season calendar ==
Round	Date	Trial	Venue	Pro class	Expert class	Women's Pro
1	21 April	New Mexico	Roswell	1) Patrick Smage; 2) Daniel Blanc-Gonnet; 3) Alexander Niederer	1) Josh Roper; 2) Alexander Myers; 3) Micah Hertrich	1) Madeleine Hoover; 2) Kylee Sweeten
2	22 April	New Mexico	Roswell	1) Patrick Smage; 2) Alexander Niederer; 3) Daniel Blanc-Gonnet	1) Alexander Myers; 2) Josh Roper; 3) Jerome Gregorowicz	1) Madeleine Hoover; 2) Kylee Sweeten
3	28 April	Colorado	Texas Creek	1) Patrick Smage; 2) Alexander Niederer; 3) Daniel Blanc-Gonnet	1) Josh Roper; 2) Alexander Myers; 3) Micah Hertrich	1) Madeleine Hoover; 2) Kylee Sweeten
4	29 April	Colorado	Texas Creek	1) Patrick Smage; 2) Daniel Blanc-Gonnet; 3) Alexander Niederer	1) Josh Roper; 2) Alexander Myers; 3) Micah Hertrich	1) Madeleine Hoover; 2) Kylee Sweeten
5	9 June	Tennessee	Sequatchie	1) Patrick Smage; 2) Alexander Niederer; 3) Karl Davis Jr	1) Drew Fortner; 2) Alexander Myers; 3) Josh Roper	1) Madeleine Hoover
6	10 June	Tennessee	Sequatchie	1) Patrick Smage; 2) Karl Davis Jr; 3) Alexander Niederer	1) Alexander Myers; 2) Josh Roper; 3) Drew Fortner	1) Madeleine Hoover
7	16 June	Arkansas	Uniontown	1) Patrick Smage; 2) Daniel Blanc-Gonnet; 3) Karl Davis Jr	1) Josh Roper; 2) Alexander Myers; 3) Micah Hertrich	1) Madeleine Hoover
8	17 June	Arkansas	Uniontown	1) Patrick Smage; 2) Karl Davis Jr; 3) Daniel Blanc-Gonnet	1) Alexander Myers; 2) Josh Roper; 3) Jonathan English	1) Madeleine Hoover
9	1 September	California	Donner Pass	1) Patrick Smage; 2) Alexander Niederer; 3) Daniel Blanc-Gonnet	1) Alexander Myers; 2) Josh Roper; 3) Ty Cullins	
10	2 September	California	Donner Pass	1) Patrick Smage; 2) Daniel Blanc-Gonnet; 3) Alexander Niederer	1) Josh Roper; 2) Micah Hertrich; 3) Alexander Myers	

=== Scoring system ===
Points were awarded to the top twenty finishers in each class. All ten rounds counted for the Pro class, and the best of nine in Expert and Women's Pro classes were counted.

Position	1st	2nd	3rd	4th	5th	6th	7th	8th	9th	10th	11th	12th	13th	14th	15th	16th	17th	18th	19th	20th
Points	30	25	21	18	16	15	14	13	12	11	10	9	8	7	6	5	4	3	2	1

=== NATC Pro final standings ===
Pos	Rider	Machine	NM (New Mexico)	NM (New Mexico)	CO (Colorado)	CO (Colorado)	TN (Tennessee)	TN (Tennessee)	AR (Arkansas)	AR (Arkansas)	CA (California)	CA (California)	Pts	notes
1	(United States) Patrick Smage	Sherco	1	1	1	1	1	1	1	1	1	1	300	
2	(United States) Daniel Blanc-Gonnet	Gas Gas	2	3	3	2	4	4	2	3	3	2	220	winner of 2018 Ute Cup (RMTA)
3	(Austria) Alexander Niederer	Gas Gas	3	2	2	3	2	3	-	-	2	3	184	
4	(United States) Samuel Fastle	Sherco	4	4	4	4	5	5	4	4	4	4	176	
5	(Austria) Andreas Niederer	Beta	6	5	6	5	6	6	5	5	5	5	156	
6	(United States) Karl Davis Jr	Scorpa	-	-	-	-	3	2	3	2	-	-	92	
7	(United States) Quinn Wentzel	Scorpa	5	6	5	6	-	-	-	-	-	-	62	

=== NATC Expert final standings ===
Pos	Rider	Machine	NM (New Mexico)	NM (New Mexico)	CO (Colorado)	CO (Colorado)	TN (Tennessee)	TN (Tennessee)	AR (Arkansas)	AR (Arkansas)	CA (California)	CA (California)	Pts	notes
1	(United States) Josh Roper	Sherco	1	2	1	1	3	2	1	2	2	1	250 (271)	
2	(United States) Alexander Myers	Scorpa	2	1	2	2	2	1	2	1	1	3	245 (266)	2017 Expert Champion
3	(United States) Micah Hertrich	Gas Gas	3	4	3	3	4	5	3	4	4	2	181 (197)	
4	(United States) Jerome Gregorowicz	Beta	4	3	4	4	5	4	4	5	-	-	143	
5	(United States) Nigel Parker	Sherco	7	5	7	7	8	7	7	7	-	-	113	
6	(Canada) Brian Wojnarowski	Sherco	5	7	8	8	7	8	6	6	-	-	113	
7	(United States) Sam Meyerpeter	Sherco	6	6	6	6	-	-	-	-	7	7	88	
8	(Canada) Jonathan English	Beta	-	-	-	-	6	6	5	3	-	-	67	
9	(United States) Drew Fortner	Beta	-	-	-	-	1	3	-	-	-	-	51	
10	(United States) Ty Cullins		-	-	-	-	-	-	-	-	3	4	39	
11	(United States) Keith Sweeten		-	-	-	-	-	-	-	-	5	5	32	
12	(United States) Miles Morgan	Scorpa	-	-	5	5	-	-	-	-	-	-	32	
13	(United States) Tracon Kirk		-	-	-	-	-	-	-	-	6	6	30	
14	(United States) Alan Shirley	Gas Gas	-	-	-	-	9	9	-	-	-	-	24	

=== NATC Women's Pro final standings ===
Pos	Rider	Machine	NM (New Mexico)	NM (New Mexico)	CO (Colorado)	CO (Colorado)	TN (Tennessee)	TN (Tennessee)	AR (Arkansas)	AR (Arkansas)	CA (California)	CA (California)	Pts	Notes
1	(United States) Madeleine Hoover	Gas Gas	1	1	1	1	1	1	1	1	-	-	240	
2	(United States) Kylee Sweeten	Sherco	2	2	2	2	-	-	-	-	-	-	100	
