= Siri Minken =

Norwegian former motorcycle rider

- Nationality: (Norway) Norwegian
- Born: 4 February 1980 (age 46); Oslo, Norway

Siri Minken (born 4 February 1980 in Oslo, Norway), is a former Norwegian women's International motorcycle trials rider. Minken was Norwegian Women's Trials Champion in 2001 and also a member of the Norwegian Women's Team which won the 2001 Trial des Nations event.

== Biography ==
In 1999 Minken competed in the newly formed FIM European Women's Championship which consisted of one round held that year in Italy. She finished in 8th position.

Minken returned in 2000 to ride the European series once more, now riding a Gas Gas. The series had now expanded to three rounds held in Germany, Italy and concluding in her homeland of Norway. After a best ride of fifth in Germany and good placings at the other rounds she ended the season in sixth place. She also contested the FIM World Women's Trials Championship, a single round affair held in Spain, finishing 11th.

In 2001, Minken clinched the Norwegian Trials Championship and competed in the European championship. In the European championship a fifth in Spain and an eighth in Italy was enough for a sixth-place finish in the championship. The FIM World round in Italy brought her an eighth-place finish, three steps higher than the previous season. Minken also left Europe and ventured over to the United States to compete in the NATC Trials Championship. Although only competing in four of the ten rounds she placed second in Rhode Island day one, then won on day two, then took a double victory in New York, giving her third place in the American National Series behind the Canadian duo of Christy Williams and Kerry Williams. Minken joined her Norwegian Trial des Nations teammates Linda Meyer and Kjersty Fla in France and they took a win ahead of a strong Spanish team, claiming the 2001 FIM Women's TDN title.

The pace slowed a little for Minken in 2002, taking eighth place in the Norwegian Women's series.

In 2003, Minken was runner-up in the Norwegian championship, which now had a new one round format instead of a multi-round series. In the European championship, Minken finished seventh in France and did not contest the following rounds leaving her 15th in the championship.

Minken contested the full European Women's championship in 2004, finishing 14th in France, seventh in Britain and seventh again in Spain, enough for a top-0ten finish in the title race. She also finished fifth and 12th in the two-round FIM World Women's championship held in Spain to end the season sixth overall.

Minken now works as a sports psychologist with FIM Europe.

== National Trials Championship Career ==
Year	Class	Machine	Rd 1	Rd 2	Rd 3	Rd 4	Rd 5	Rd 6	Rd 7	Rd 8	Rd 9	Rd 10	Points	Pos	Notes
2001	(United States) NATC Women's	Gas Gas	CA -	CA -	RI; 2	RI; 1	NY; 1	NY; 1	NM -	NM -	NE -	NE -	115	3rd	
2003	(Norway) Norwegian Women's	Gas Gas	OSL; 2										17	2nd	

== International Trials Championship Career ==
Year	Class	Machine	Rd 1	Rd 2	Rd 3	Points	Pos	Notes
1999	FIM Women's European Championship	Montesa	ITA; 8			8	8th	
2000	FIM Women's European Championship	Gas Gas	GER; 5	ITA; 7	NOR; 6	30	6th	
2000	FIM Women's World Championship	Gas Gas	SPA; 11			5	11th	
2001	FIM Women's European Championship	Gas Gas	SPA; 5	ITA; 8		19	6th	
2001	FIM Women's World Championship	Gas Gas	ITA; 8			8	8th	Norwegian Women's Champion
2003	FIM Women's European Championship	Gas Gas	FRA; 11	ITA -	RSM -	5	15th	
2004	FIM Women's European Championship	Montesa	FRA; 14	GBR; 7	SPA; 7	20	10th	
2004	FIM Women's World Championship	Montesa	SPA; 5	SPA; 12		15	6th	

== Honors ==
- Norwegian Women's Trials Champion 2001
- FIM Trial des Nations Women's Trials Champion team member 2001

== Related Reading ==
- NATC Trials Championship
- FIM Trial European Championship
- FIM Trial World Championship
- Trial des Nations
