= Laura Bussing =

American motorcycle racer

- Nationality: (United States) American
- Born: 8 March 1964 (age 62); Sequatchie. Tennessee, United States

Laura Bussing (born 3 August 1964) is an American former International motorcycle trials championship rider. Bussing was the NATC's first Women's Trials Champion in 1998.

== Biography ==
Bussing was born in Sequatchie, Tennessee. In 1998, the NATC added a Women's championship to the series, and Bussing took the title becoming the first official US Women's champion.

The following year, Bussing finished fifth in the championship after competing in five of the eleven rounds.

For the 2000 championship, Bussing competed in and scored in all ten rounds, ending the season in a strong fourth place behind Canadian riders Christy Williams and her sister Kerry Williams, and third-place finisher Pam DeBruin. Branching out into Europe, Bussing also competed in the Spanish world round.

Bussing was sixth in the 2001 NATC Women's Championship after competing in three rounds.

In 2002, Bussing was back in the running with a string of podium finishes, she ended the season in third place behind Kerry Williams and Andrea Davis. Bussing was chosen to represent the US on the women's team at the FIM Trial des Nations, this year held in Portugal. With teammates Nicole Bradford and Kerrie Brokaw, the US team finished in seventh place. Bussing competed in the FIM World round in Portugal, finishing in 17th place against the best riders in the world.

2003 was to be Bussing's last season in national competition, she rode only one round in Washington, finishing fourth at the event and 11th in the series.

== National Trials Championship Career ==
Year	Class	Machine	Rd 1	Rd 2	Rd 3	Rd 4	Rd 5	Rd 6	Rd 7	Rd 8	Rd 9	Rd 10	Rd 11	Rd 12	Rd 13	Points	Pos	Notes
1999	(United States) NATC Women's	Gas Gas	TX -	TX -	CA -	CO; 5	CO -	OR -	OR; 3	PA; 3	PA; 2	WY -	WY -			98	5th	
2001	(United States) NATC Women's	Gas Gas	CA -	CA -	RI -	RI -	NY; 5	NY; 6	NM; 4	NM -	NE -	NE -				49	6th	
2002	(United States) NATC Women's	Gas Gas	FL; 2	FL; 2	TX -	TX; 2	PA; 3	PA -	TN; 4	TN -	CO; 4	CO; 4				132	3rd	
2003	(United States) NATC Women's	Gas Gas	CA -	CA -	WA -	WA; 4	OR -	OR -	PA -	PA -	RI -	RI -	WY -	WY -	CA -	18	11th	

== Honors ==
- NATC Women's Trials Champion 1998
