= Fred Crosset =

Belgian motorcycle racer

- Nationality: (Belgium) Belgian
- Born: 6 April 1975 (age 51); Verviers, Belgium
- Website: fredcrosset.com

Fred Crosset (born 6 April 1975 in Verviers, Belgium), is a former Belgian International motorcycle trials rider. Crosset is a ten-time Belgian Trials Champion and American NATC Pro Champion in 2001 and 2002. He currently runs the Circus Trial Tour.

== Biography ==
In 1998, Crosset competed in the FIM European Trials Championship series. He took his first podium of the year at the second round in Portugal with a third place. His best placing of the series was a second place in Italy. Crosset finished the season in a creditable fifth position.

Back in the European Championships for 1999, Crosset finished the season in third place with a best position of second in Italy.

A change of scenery in 2001 as Crosset moved to America to compete in the NATC National Championships. Showing a difference in level between the Euro championships and the NATC, Crosset racked up wins in each of the first four rounds before Ryon Bell managed to get back on the top step at the New York round. Geoff Aaron took the wins in New Mexico with Crosset second, but a pair wins in Nebraska sealed the Championship win for Crosset.

Again in the NATC championship for 2002, a shaky start in Florida as 2000 Champion Geoff Aaron took a pair of wins, leaving Crosset 14 points adrift. It was not to cause a problem however, as Crosset followed up with seven straight wins across the country to clinch his second straight NATC title.

After leaving the United States, Crosset returned to contest the FIM European Championships for the 2003 season. His season best finish was a third place at the opening round in France. He finished the season in fifth place.

== National Trials Championship career ==
Year	Class	Machine	Rd 1	Rd 2	Rd 3	Rd 4	Rd 5	Rd 6	Rd 7	Rd 8	Rd 9	Rd 10	Points	Pos	Notes
2001	(United States) NATC Pro	Gas Gas	CA; 1	CA; 1	RI; 1	RI; 1	NY; 2	NY; 4	NM; 2	NM; 2	NE; 1	NE; 1	255	1st	US NATC Pro Champion
2002	(United States) NATC Pro	Gas Gas	FL; 2	FL; 3	TX; 1	TX; 1	PA; 1	PA; 1	TN; 1	TN; 1	CO; 1	CO; 5	256	1st	US NATC Pro Champion

== International Trials Championship career ==
Year	Class	Machine	Rd 1	Rd 2	Rd 3	Rd 4	Rd 5	Rd 6	Points	Pos	Notes
1997	FIM European Championship	Gas Gas	POR; 5	SPA; 3	FRA; 4	POL; 3	ITA; 4	GER; 10	73	4th	
1998	FIM European Championship	Gas Gas	SPA; 7	POR; 3	POL; 7	ITA; 2	FRA -	GER; 7	59	5th	
1999	FIM European Championship	Gas Gas	SPA; 7	ITA; 3	FRA; 4	GER; 13	CZE; 5	POL; 4	64	3rd	
2003	FIM European Championship	Gas Gas	FRA; 3	ITA; 15	POL; 9	CZE; 5	ITA -		34	10th	

== Honors ==
- US National NATC Pro Trials Champion 2001, 2002

== Related Reading ==
- NATC Trials Championship
- FIM Trial European Championship
- FIM Trial World Championship
