= Sarah Duke =

American motorcycle racer

- Nationality: (United States) American
- Born: 28 October 1987 (age 39); Colorado Springs, Colorado, U.S.

Sarah Duke (born 28 October 1987) is an international women's motorcycle trials rider.

== Biography ==
Duke was born in Colorado Springs, Colorado. She began riding trials in 2001.

In 2005, Duke was selected for the US Women's Trial des Nations team with Nicole Bradford and Louise Forsley to compete in Italy. The team finished in ninth place.

Duke finished the 2006 season with third place in the US NATC Women's Trials Championship behind the Canadian Gas-Gas rider Kerry Williams and the American Sherco rider Caroline Altman. With Forsley, Duke competed for the US Trial des Nations team in France, finishing seventh.

In 2007, Duke put together a string of top-two finishes, including a win in Tennessee and a pair of wins in Ohio. This was enough to give her the runner-up position in the championship, with Williams again taking the title and Caroline Altman third. Now part of the established US Women's TDN team with Forsley, the pair traveled to the Isle of Man for the 2007 event, finishing in sixth position.

In 2008 and 2009, Duke was again the runner-up, this time behind Williams' sister, Christy Williams.

Duke was runner-up again in 2011 when she finished behind Caroline Allen and ahead of the third placed future champion Rachel Hassler. A trip to Italy for the Trial des Nations event with Allen and her longtime teammate Forsley resulted in a seventh-place finish.

== NATC Trials Championship career ==
Year	Team	Class	1	2	3	4	5	6	7	8	9	10	11	12	13	Points	Rank
2003	Gas-Gas	Women's	CA -	CA -	WA -	WA -	OR -	OR -	PA -	PA -	RI -	RI -	WY; 9	WY; 8	CA; 8	38	10th
2004	Gas-Gas	Women's	TN; 5	TN; 5	CO -	CO; 6	CA; 6	OH; 4	OH; 4	VT; 3	VT; 3					94	4th
2005	Gas-Gas	Women's	TX; 5	TX; 5	TN; 5	TN; 5	CO; 6	CO; 6	CA -	CA; 4	VT; 3	VT; 3	NY; 2	NY; 2		142	4th
2006	Gas-Gas	Women's	AZ; 2	AZ; 2	OK; 2	OK; 2	TN -	TN -	RI -	RI -						100	3rd
2007	Gas-Gas	Women's	CO; 2	CO; 2	TN; 1	TN; 2	OH; 1	OH; 1	CA; 2	CA; 2	MN; 2	MN; 2				165	2nd
2008	Gas-Gas	Women's	CO; 2	CO; 2	CO; 2	MN; 2	MN; 2	MN; 3								125	2nd
2009	Gas-Gas	Women's	NE; 3	NE; 3	TN; 1	TN; 1	VT; 2	VT; 2	NY; 4	NY; 4						131	2nd
2010	Gas-Gas	Women's	OK; 3	OK; 3	RI -	RI -	NY -	NY -	CO; 4	CO; 3	CA; 3	CA; 2				127	5th
2011	Gas-Gas	Women's	TX; 1	TX; 1	PA; 1	PA; 2	TN; 2	TN; 2	TN; 2							140	2nd
2012	Gas-Gas	Women's	CA; 2	CA; 2	CO; 2	CO; 3	OH; 3	OH; 3	RI; 3	RI; 4						117	3rd
2013		Women's	NY -	NY -	VT -	VT -	AZ -	AZ -	NM; 1	NM; 3	MN -	MN -				51	4th
2014		Women's	CO; 2	CO; 1	KS; 2	KS; 1	PA -	PA -	TN; 4	TN; 1						140	2nd

== See also ==
- NATC Trials Championship
- FIM Trial World Championship
