= Caroline Allen =

American motorcycle racer

- Nationality: (United States) American
- Born: June 18, 1992 (age 34); Attleboro, Massachusetts, U.S.
- Current team: Gas Gas

Caroline Allen (born June 18, 1992 in Attleboro, Massachusetts) is an American women's international motorcycle trials rider.

== Biography ==
Allen first competed in the NATC Women's Trials Championship in 2005, scoring a third-place finish in the final New York round, enough to give her 10th place in the championship. She returned in 2006 and entered three rounds, taking her first national victory in Rhode Island and ending the season with a good 4th place.

After skipping national events in 2007, Allen returned to compete in her first full season in 2008, taking podium finishes in all six rounds and finishing the season in third place behind Canadian Christy Williams and Sarah Duke. Allen was selected to represent the US in the annual FIM Trial des Nations event held in Andorra alongside Duke and Louise Forsley. The US women's team finished in seventh position.

In the NATC Championship for 2009, Allen was once again third behind Williams and Duke. This year, the TDN was held in Italy and the US team of Allen and Duke finished in eighth place.

One step closer to the top in 2010 after a pair of wins in Rhode Island and another pair in New York moved Allen up the standings to 2nd place behind Williams. Another trip to the TDN series was on the card as Allen and Duke journeyed to Poland and came home with eighth place.

A strong finish in the nationals for 2011. Allen won the final four rounds and claimed her first NATC National title ahead of TDN teammate Sarah Duke. The pair were then joined by Louise Forsley for a trip to Italy for a seventh-place finish in the 2011 TDN event.

In 2012, Allen was beaten in the NATC title chase by New Mexico rider Rachel Hassler, ending the season in 2nd place. Hassler also joined Allen and Forsley in the US TDN team who finished fifth in Switzerland, only 5 points behind the German team.

The following year, Allen regained her US Women's title, taking the win ahead of Hassler in the newly added NATC Women's Expert Sportsman class.

In 2015, the NATC support classes were split into separate East and West series. Allen finished in second place in the Eastern series behind Madeleine Hoover.

Competing in only the Florida National rounds in 2016, Allen finished fifth in the NATC East Women's Expert Sportsman class.

== National Trials Championship Career ==
Year	Class	Machine	Rd 1	Rd 2	Rd 3	Rd 4	Rd 5	Rd 6	Rd 7	Rd 8	Rd 9	Rd 10	Rd 11	Rd 12	Points	Pos	Notes
2005	(United States) NATC Women's	Gas Gas	TX -	TX -	TN -	TN -	CO -	CO -	CA -	CA -	VT -	VT -	NY -	NY; 3	21	10th	
2006	(United States) NATC Women's	Gas Gas	AZ -	AZ -	OK -	OK -	TN; 3	TN -	RI; 2	RI; 1					76	4th	
2008	(United States) NATC Women's	Gas Gas	CO; 3	CO; 3	CO; 3	MN; 3	MN; 3	MN; 2							109	3rd	member of US Trial des Nations team
2009	(United States) NATC Women's	Gas Gas	NE -	NE -	TN; 2	TN; 2	VT; 5	VT; 4	NY; 3	NY; 1					119	3rd	
2010	(United States) NATC Women's	Gas Gas	OK -	OK -	RI; 1	RI; 1	NY; 1	NY; 1	CO; 5	CO; 5	CA -	CA -			152	2nd	
2011	(United States) NATC Women's	Gas Gas	TX -	TX -	PA; 2	PA; 1	TN; 1	TN; 1	TN; 1						145	1st	
2012	(United States) NATC Women's	Gas Gas	CA -	CA -	CO; 3	CO; 4	OH; 1	OH; 2	RI; 2	RI; 1					131	2nd	
2013	(United States) NATC Women's ES	Gas Gas	NY; 1	NY; 1	VT; 1	VT; 1	AZ; 1	AZ; 2	NM; 2	NM; 1	MN -	MN -			180	1st	
2015	(United States) NATC Women's East ES	Gas Gas	NE; 2	NE; 2	OH; 3	OH; 1									80	2nd	
2016	(United States) NATC Women's East ES	Gas Gas	FL; 4	FL; 4	TN -	TN -									36	5th	

== Honors ==
- US National NATC Women's Trials Champion 2011
- US National NATC Women's ES Trials Champion 2013

== See also ==
- NATC Trials Championship
- FIM Trial European Championship
- FIM Trial World Championship
- Trial des Nations
