= Jack Stites =

American motorcycle trials rider (1953–2018)

- Nationality: (United States) American
- Born: 13 October 1953; Wayland, Massachusetts, United States
- Died: 13 August 2018 (aged 64); Bristol, Florida, United States

John Francis "Jack" Stites (born 13 October 1953 in Wayland, Massachusetts, United States; died August 13, 2018), was a former American International motorcycle trials rider. He was also a motorsport commentator for the BBC in England during the 1980s.

== Biography ==
During his earlier riding years, Stites won the Southeastern Trials Riders Association regional title (STRA) four times from 1978 through 1981. In 1980 he finished 5th in the US NATC Championship after scoring in all six rounds, taking a win at round six in Texas.

Competing in the FIM World Trials round held in the US, Stites placed 15th and out of the points. The 1982 season saw Stites finish runner up to Bernie Schreiber in the NATC Championship. He won the opening round held in California and the final round in Texas, as well as being on the podium a further three times. At this years US round of the FIM World Championship. Stites was 19th and again outside of the points.

In 1983, Stites made another attempt at the FIM World round, this time landing in 22nd place.

Between 1984 and 1990, Stites was co-host of the popular BBC Trials show "Kick Start" alongside presenter Peter Purves. He also found time to finish 16th at the US world round in 1984.

Stites finished 14th in the US World round of 1985, giving him two championship points and 32nd place in the series.

In 1994, Stites made a return to competition, this time in the second tier NATC Expert class. He won the opening two rounds in Florida and went on to finish runner-up in the series to defending champion Ron Schmelzle.

In 2017, Stites was inducted into the North American Trials Council (NATC) hall of fame.

Stites died after a battle with cancer at his home in Florida on 13 August 2018.

== National Trials Championship career ==
Year	Class	Machine	Rd 1	Rd 2	Rd 3	Rd 4	Rd 5	Rd 6	Rd 7	Rd 8	Rd 9	Points	Pos	Notes
1980	(United States) NATC Champ	SWM	CA; 6	CA; 7	OH; 4	AL; 6	CO; 7	TX; 1				33	5th	
1982	(United States) NATC Champ	Fantic	FL; 1	CA; 6	MT; 2	MT; 4	RI; 3	MA; 2	NY; 2	TN; 1		66	2nd	
1994	(United States) NATC Expert	Gas Gas	FL; 1	FL; 1	NY; 2	PA; 2	OH; 3	WY -	WY -	NE -	NE -	131	2nd	

== International Trials Championship career ==
Year	Class	Machine	Rd 1	Rd 2	Rd 3	Rd 4	Rd 5	Rd 6	Rd 7	Rd 8	Rd 9	Rd 10	Rd 11	Rd 12	Points	Pos	Notes
1985	FIM World Championship	Yamaha	SPA -	BEL -	GBR -	IRL -	FRA -	USA; 14	AUT -	POL -	FIN -	SWE -	SWI -	GER -	2	32nd	

== Honors ==
- STRA Trials Champion 1978, 1979, 1980, 1981

== Related Reading ==
- NATC Trials Championship
- FIM Trial European Championship
- FIM Trial World Championship
- Trial des Nations
