= Kerry Williams =

Kerry Williams may refer to:

- Kerry Williams (field hockey)
- Kerry Williams (motorcyclist)

== See also ==
- Kerri Williams, New Zealand rower
