= Jonny Andersson =

Swedish International motorcycle trials rider (born 1964)

- Nationality: (Sweden) Swedish
- Born: 25 April 1964 (age 62); Kungsbacka, Sweden
- Current team: Retired

Jonny Andersson (born 25 April 1964 in Kungsbacka, Sweden), is a former Swedish International motorcycle trials rider. Andersson was the Swedish National Trials Champion in 1985 and the Canadian National Trials Champion in 1987 and 1988.

== Biography ==
Andersson was Swedish National Trials champion in 1985, and a member of the Swedish Trial des Nations team that finished fifth in Piano Rancho, Italy. The other team members were Lars Karlsson, Urban Lindholm and Martin Karlsson.

After relocating to Texas, Andersson competed in North America during the 1987 season. He finished third in the US NATC Pro series behind former world champion Bernie Schreiber and Ryan Young. Riding a little further north, he won the Canadian CMA National Trials Championship.

Andersson retained his Canadian title in 1988 and moved up to second place in the NATC final standings, beaten by Ryan Young.

1989 was to be Andersson's final year in North America. He once again finished runner-up in the NATC Pro series to Young, after winning the Texas, Utah and both final Washington rounds.

== National Trials Championship Career ==
| Year | Class | Machine | Rd 1 | Rd 2 | Rd 3 | Rd 4 | Rd 5 | Rd 6 | Rd 7 | Rd 8 | Rd 9 | Points | Pos | Notes |
|---|---|---|---|---|---|---|---|---|---|---|---|---|---|---|
| 1985 | (Sweden) Swedish Champ | Yamaha | | | | | | | | | | | 1st | Swedish Champion |
| 1987 | (United States) NATC Pro | Honda | | | | | | | | | | | 3rd | |
| 1987 | (Canada) CMA Champ | Honda | | | | | | | | | | | 1st | Canadian Champion |
| 1988 | (United States) NATC Pro | Honda | | | | | | | | | | | 2nd | |
| 1988 | (Canada) CMA Champ | Honda | | | | | | | | | | | 1st | Canadian Champion |
| 1989 | (United States) NATC Pro | Honda | NY; 2 | OH; 2 | TN; 2 | TX; 1 | TX; 2 | UT; 1 | CO; 2 | WA; 1 | WA; 1 | 72 | 2nd | |

== International Trials Championship Career ==
| Year | Class | Machine | Rd 1 | Rd 2 | Rd 3 | Rd 4 | Rd 5 | Rd 6 | Rd 7 | Rd 8 | Rd 9 | Rd 10 | Rd 11 | Rd 12 | Points | Pos | Notes |
|---|---|---|---|---|---|---|---|---|---|---|---|---|---|---|---|---|---|
| 1984 | FIM World Championship | Yamaha | SPA; 11 | BEL; 13 | GBR; 11 | IRL; 18 | FRA; 17 | GER; 10 | USA; 8 | CAN; 10 | AUT; 15 | ITA; 12 | FIN - | SWE - | 38 | 15th | |
| 1985 | FIM World Championship | Yamaha | SPA; 14 | BEL; 17 | GBR; 7 | IRL; 10 | FRA; 16 | USA; 7 | AUT; 19 | POL; 22 | FIN; 23 | SWE; 7 | SWI; 15 | GER; 35 | 36 | 13th | |

== Honors ==
- Swedish National Trials Champion 1985
- Canadian National Trials Champion 1987, 1988

== Related Reading ==
- NATC Trials Championship
- FIM Trial European Championship
- FIM Trial World Championship
