= Cody Webb =

US motorcycle racer

- Born: May 31, 1988 (age 38); Watsonville, California, U.S.

Cody Webb (born May 31, 1988) is an American professional motorcycle trials rider and endurocross racer. Webb was the 2010 United States NATC Motorcycle Trials Champion.

Webb has also competed in EnduroX. At the X Games, he has claimed silver medals in Foz do Iguaçu 2013 and Los Angeles 2012 and 2014, as well as bronze medals in Los Angeles 2013 and Barcelona 2013. He has also won the 2014, 2015 and 2017 AMA EnduroCross Championship.

== Biography ==
Born in Watsonville, California, Webb turned professional in 2003 after clinching the NATC Expert title, moving into the Pro class for the final three rounds of the series.

Webb won his first Pro series trial in Tennessee in 2006, going on to finish second in the championship behind Geoff Aaron. Early in the season, Webb also clinched the prestigious El Trial de Espana for the first time, an event put on by the SoCal Trials Association.

Webb continued to be a contender for the title over the next few years, winning the NATC Indoor Championship in 2007 and finishing runner-up to Patrick Smage in 2007.

Webb was becoming a favorite at the El Trial de Espana event, winning the event back to back in 2008 and 2009.

After winning nine of the ten national rounds of the 2010 NATC Pro series, Webb gained the title he had fought Smage for over many seasons, then signed a contract to ride with the factory Beta team in 2011.

In 2011, Smage regained his title with Webb again finishing runner-up. Webb did regain his El Trial de Espana title though.

== National Trials Championship Career ==
| Year | Class | Machine | Rd 1 | Rd 2 | Rd 3 | Rd 4 | Rd 5 | Rd 6 | Rd 7 | Rd 8 | Rd 9 | Rd 10 | Rd 11 | Rd 12 | Rd 13 | Points | Pos | Notes |
|---|---|---|---|---|---|---|---|---|---|---|---|---|---|---|---|---|---|---|
| 2003 | (United States) NATC Expert | Gas Gas | CA; 5 | CA; 3 | WA; 2 | WA; 2 | OR; 1 | OR; 1 | PA; 1 | PA; 1 | RI; 1 | RI; 1 | WY - | WY - | CA - | 205 | 1st | NATC Expert Champion |
| 2003 | (United States) NATC Pro | Gas Gas | CA - | CA - | WA - | WA - | OR - | OR - | PA - | PA - | RI - | RI - | WY; 11 | WY; 11 | CA; 10 | 31 | 13th | |
| 2004 | (United States) NATC Pro | Gas Gas | TN; 9 | TN; 7 | CO; 5 | CO; 5 | CA; 7 | OH; 5 | OH; 7 | VT; 4 | VT; 3 | | | | | 141 | 6th | |
| 2005 | (United States) NATC Pro | Sherco | TX; 4 | TX; 4 | TN; 4 | TN; 5 | CO; 4 | CO; 3 | CA; 4 | CA; 4 | VT; 4 | VT; 4 | NY; 4 | NY; 4 | | 183 | 4th | |
| 2006 | (United States) NATC Pro | Sherco | AZ; 3 | AZ; 5 | OK; 4 | OK; 6 | TN; 1 | TN; 2 | RI; 3 | RI; 2 | | | | | | 156 | 2nd | winner of 2006 El Trial de Espana |
| 2007 | (United States) NATC Pro | Sherco | CO; 3 | CO; 2 | TN; 2 | TN; 3 | OH; 3 | OH; 3 | CA; 3 | CA; 1 | MN; 1 | MN; 2 | | | | 219 | 2nd | |
| 2008 | (United States) NATC Pro | Sherco | CO; 4 | CO; 3 | CO; 1 | MN; 1 | MN; 2 | MN; 4 | | | | | | | | 142 | 2nd | winner of 2008 El Trial de Espana |
| 2009 | (United States) NATC Pro | Sherco | NE; 2 | NE; 2 | TN; 2 | TN; 2 | VT; 3 | VT; 2 | NY; 1 | NY; 1 | | | | | | 185 | 2nd | winner of 2009 El Trial de Espana |
| 2010 | (United States) NATC Pro | Gas Gas | OK; 1 | OK; 2 | RI; 1 | RI; 2 | NY; 1 | NY; 1 | CO; 1 | CO; 1 | CA; 1 | CA; 1 | | | | 265 | 1st | NATC Pro Champion |
| 2011 | (United States) NATC Pro | Beta | TX; 1 | TX; 2 | PA; 2 | PA; 2 | TN; 2 | TN; 2 | TN; 1 | | | | | | | 160 | 2nd | winner of 2011 El Trial de Espana |
| 2012 | (United States) NATC Pro | Beta | CA; 2 | CA; 1 | CO; 2 | CO; 1 | OH; 2 | OH; 2 | RI; 2 | RI; 1 | | | | | | 190 | 2nd | |
| 2013 | (United States) NATC Pro | | NY - | NY - | VT - | VT - | AZ - | AZ - | NM - | NM - | MN; 1 | MN; 2 | | | | 55 | 6th | winner of 2013 El Trial de Espana |
| 2014 | (United States) NATC Pro | | CO - | CO - | KS - | KS - | PA - | PA - | TN; 1 | TN; 1 | | | | | | 60 | 6th | winner of 2014 El Trial de Espana |
| 2015 | (United States) NATC Pro | Montesa | TX; 2 | TX; 3 | AZ; 4 | AZ; 2 | NE - | NE; 7 | OH; 2 | OH; 6 | WY; 3 | WY; 2 | | | | 189 | 3rd | |

== Honors ==
- NATC Expert Trials Champion 2003
- NATC Pro Trials Champion 2010
- AMA Endurocross Champion 2014
- AMA Endurocross Champion 2015
- RedBull Signature Series - Hare Scramble (2nd) 2016
- AMA Endurocross Champion 2017

== Related reading ==
- NATC Trials Championship
- FIM Trial World Championship
