= Ryon Bell =

Canadian motorcycle trials rider (b. 1978)

- Nationality: (Canada) Canadian
- Born: 26 April 1978 (age 48); Victoria, Canada

Ryon Bell (born 26 April 1978 in Victoria, Canada), is a Canadian International motorcycle trials rider. Bell was Canadian Expert Champion in 2000.

== Biography ==
In 1993, Bell came close to taking his first NATC title when despite taking wins in Washington, a double in New Mexico, and a win in Texas, he was runner-up in the NATC Highschool championship to Matt Moore of Oklahoma.

In 1998, Bell finished second in the NATC Champ class behind factory Beta rider Geoff Aaron.

Bell had a good 2000 season. He won all four rounds of the Canadian Expert Championship and becoming National Champion. He contested the NATC Champ series. In Minnesota, Bell was second to Ray Peters on day one, with reigning champ Aaron finishing fourh and on day two he took the win ahead of Aaron. He took three wins, but was beaten to the title again by Aaron.

In 2001, the addition of Belgian rider Fred Crosset to the NATC Champ class made it harder to win, but Bell won once in New York. The season ended Crosset, Aaron, Bell. 2002 was almost a repeat of the 2001 season, with the season standing the same.

For 2003, Bell took runner-up behind Aaron winning in Washington. As the season had approached Rhode Island, Bell was showing good form, winning day two. He then edged out Aaron in Wyoming, but Aaron's second place was enough to take the title.

In 2004, Bell again came second to Aaron.

== National Trials Championship Career ==
Year	Class	Machine	Rd 1	Rd 2	Rd 3	Rd 4	Rd 5	Rd 6	Rd 7	Rd 8	Rd 9	Rd 10	Rd 11	Rd 12	Rd 13	Points	Pos	Notes
1993	(United States) NATC High School	Gas-Gas	PA -	PA -	WA; 3	WA; 1	NM; 1	NM; 1	TX; 2	TX; 1						145	2nd	
1995	(United States) NATC Pro	Gas-Gas	AZ; 7	AZ; 9	CA; 7	PA -	NY -	RI -	CO; 8	CO; 7	OR; 7	OR; 7				82	9th	
1996	(United States) NATC Pro	Gas-Gas	CA; 10	IL; 8	IL; 8	TN; 7	TN; 5	CA; 6	CA; 5	NE; 4	MO; 5					132	7th	
2001	(United States) NATC Pro	Montesa	CA; 3	CA; 2	RI; 4	RI; 5	NY; 1	NY; 3	NM; 3	NM; 4	NE; 3	NE; 4				193	3rd	
2002	(United States) NATC Pro	Montesa	FL; 3	FL; 5	TX; 4	TX; 4	PA; 2	PA; 4	TN; 3	TN; 2	CO; 3	CO; 2				192	3rd	El Trial de Espana winner (SCTA)
2003	(United States) NATC Pro	Gas-Gas	CA; 2	CA; 3	WA; 2	WA; 1	OR; 2	OR; 2	PA; 3	PA; 2	RI; 4	RI; 1	WY; 1	WY; 2	CA; 2	325	2nd	
2004	(United States) NATC Pro	Gas-Gas	TN; 3	TN; 3	CO; 2	CO; 2	CA; 2	OH; 2	OH; 3	VT; 5	VT; 2					204	2nd	

== Honors ==
- Ute Cup winner 1999
- Canadian Expert Trials Champion 2000
- El Trial de Espana winner 2002

== Related Reading ==
- NATC Trials Championship
- FIM Trial European Championship
- FIM Trial World Championship
