= NATC Trials Championship =

Sporting event

North American Trials Council
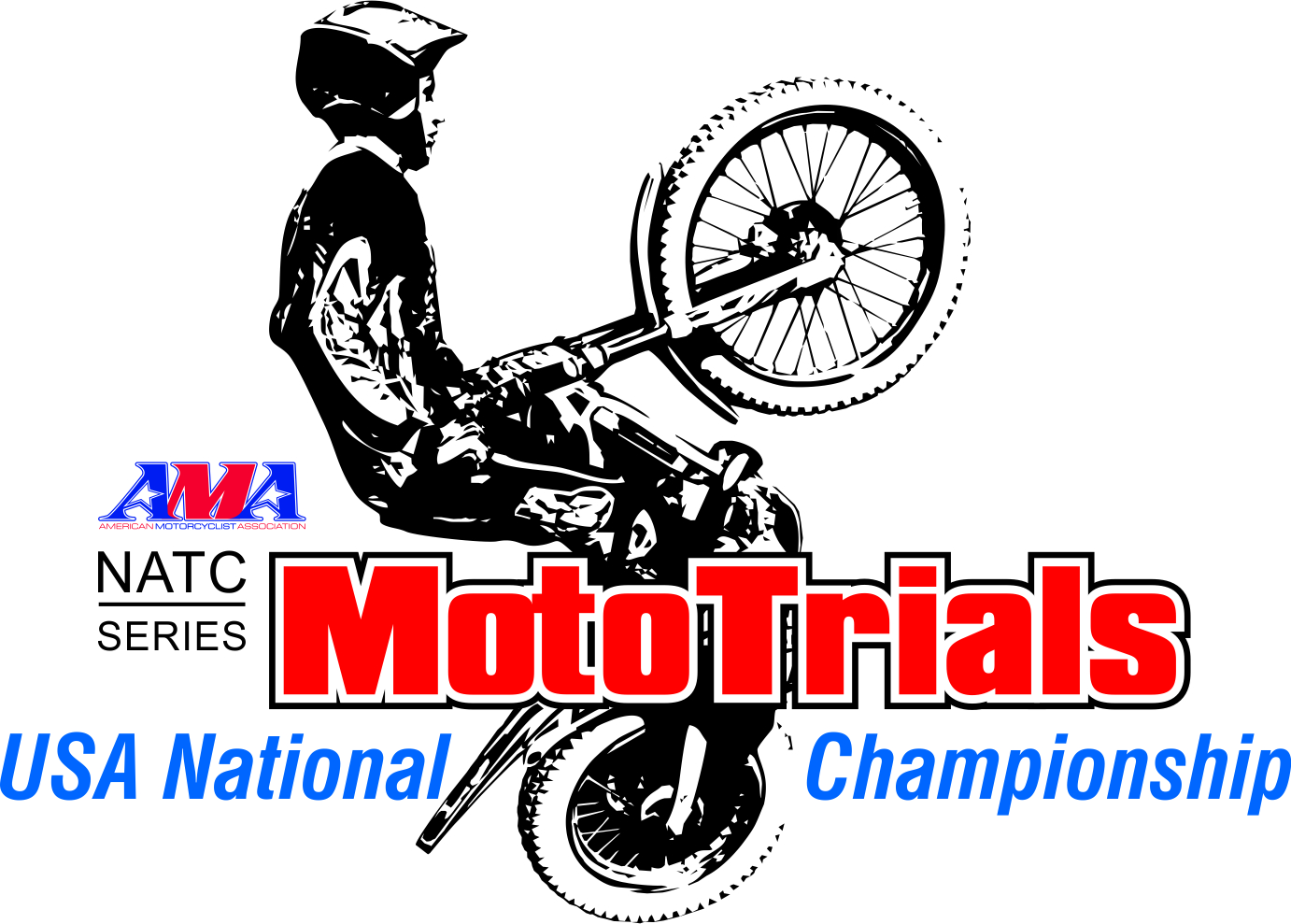
- Sport: Motorcycle racing
- Jurisdiction: USA
- Abbreviation: NATC
- Founded: 1974

Official website
- www.mototrials.com

The North American Trials Council Championship is the official US National Trials Championship and has been held since 1974.

== History ==
In 1974 The NATC joined forces with the AMA and put together a nine-round series as the US National Trials Championship. Lane Leavitt showed his class by winning five of the eight rounds he competed in. In second place was up and coming star Marland Whaley on the Montesa with early series leader Don Sweet bringing his Yamaha home in third.

Factory Honda rider Marland Whaley stomped all over the championship in 1977 taking eight wins from eight starts, leaving the rest to fight it out for second spot. That battle was won by Bernie Schreiber who tied with Don Sweet for second but took the nod on highest place finishes throughout the season.

The 1978 Championship was a three way battle between defending champion Marland Whaley, 1974 Champion Lane Leavitt and Bernie Schreiber who was splitting his time between the nationals and the FIM Trial World Championship for the first time. Schreiber took the title after taking a win at the final round in Alabama, giving him four wins and a third for the season and a points total of 70. Leavitt was one point behind on 69 points taking three wins, and Whaley a close third behind the Bultaco riders on his Montesa.

== NATC Trials Champions ==
Year	Champ Series	Sportman Series	Women's Series
1974	1) (United States) Lane Leavitt (Bultaco); 2) (United States) Marland Whaley (Montesa); 3) (United States) Don Sweet (Yamaha)		
1975	1) (United States) Marland Whaley (Honda); 2) (United States) Don Sweet (Yamaha); 3) (United States) Mark Eggar (Honda)		
1976	1) (United States) Marland Whaley (Honda); 2) (United States) Don Sweet (Montesa); 3) (United States) Lane Leavitt (Bultaco)		
1977	1) (United States) Marland Whaley (Honda); 2) (United States) Bernie Schreiber (Bultaco); 3) (United States) Don Sweet (Montesa)		
1978	1) (United States) Bernie Schreiber (Bultaco); 2) (United States) Lane Leavitt (Bultaco); 3) (United States) Marland Whaley (Montesa)	1) (United States) Kevin Cullen (Bultaco); 2) (United States) Tom Reed (Bultaco); 3) (United States) Jeff Sefoik (Montesa)	
1979	1) (United States) Marland Whaley (Montesa); 2) (United States) Bernie Schreiber (Bultaco); 3) (United States) Jack Stites (Montesa)	1) (United States) Guy Bodin (Bultaco); 2) (United States) Peter Rudnick (Bultaco); 3) (United States) Debbie Leavitt (Bultaco)	
1980	1) (United States) Marland Whaley (Montesa); 2) (United States) Scott Head (Bultaco); 3) (United States) Morgan Kavanaugh (Bultaco)	1) (United States) David Webster (Bultaco); 2) (United States) Nils Montzoros (Montesa); 3) (United States) Keith McLaughlin (Bultaco)	
1981	1) (United States) Curt Comer Jr (Montesa); 2) (United States) Morgan Kavanaugh (Bultaco); 3) (United States) Jack Stites (SWM)	1) (United States) Jonathan Hoffnagle (Montesa)	
1982	1) (United States) Bernie Schreiber (SWM); 2) (United States) Jack Stites (Fantic); 3) (United States) Curt Comer Jr (Montesa)	1) (United States) Ron Commo II (Montesa)	
1983	1) (United States) Bernie Schreiber (SWM); 2) (United States) Don Sweet (Montesa); 3) (United States) Curt Comer Jr (Fantic)	1) (United States) Freddy Steele (Fantic)	
1984	1) (United States) Scott Head (Montesa); 2) (Canada) Stan Bakgaard (Yamaha); 3) (United States) Jack Stites (Trans-Am)	1) (United States) Ryan Young (Fantic)	
1985	1) (United States) Scott Head (Beta); 2) (United States) Steve McNeal (Fantic); 3) (Canada) Stan Bakgaard (Yamaha)	1) (United States) Ronald Schmelzle	
1986	1) (United States) Scott Head (Beta); 2) (United States) Ryan Young (Beta); 3) (United States) Don Sweet (Honda)	1) (United States) Steve Clark (Fantic)	
1987	1) (United States) Bernie Schreiber (Fantic); 2) (United States) Ryan Young (Beta); 3) (Sweden) Jonny Andersson (Honda)	1) (United States) Jeff Kingsford (Beta)	
1988	1) (United States) Ryan Young (Beta); 2) (Sweden) Jonny Andersson (Honda); 3) (United States) Mark Manniko (Fantic)	1) (United States) Kenny Leduc (Yamaha)	
1989	1) (United States) Ryan Young (Beta); 2) (Sweden) Jonny Andersson (Honda); 3) (United States) Mark Manniko (Fantic)	1) (United States) Paul Webster; 2) (United States) Todd Clark	
1990	1) (United States) Ryan Young (Beta); 2) (United States) Mark Manniko (Fantic); 3) (United States) Geoff Aaron (Aprilia)	1) (United States) Todd Clark (Fantic); 2) (United States) Gabe Mizell (Yamaha); 3) (United States) Kevin Norton (Fantic)	
1991	1) (United States) Ryan Young (Beta); 2) (United States) Geoff Aaron (Aprilia); 3) (United States) Mark Manniko	1) (United States) Ronald Schmelzle	
Year	Pro Series	Expert Series	Women's Series
1992	1) (United States) Ryan Young (Beta); 2) (United States) Geoff Aaron (Aprilia); 3) (Belgium) Olivier Clamagirand (Gas Gas)	1) (United States) Ronald Schmelzle	
1993	1) (United States) Ryan Young (Gas Gas); 2) (United States) Geoff Aaron (Beta); 3) (United States) Ray Peters (Aprilia)	1) (United States) Ronald Schmelzle; 2) (United States) Steve Clark (Aprilia); 3) (United States) Chris Bardell (Aprilia)	
1994	1) (United States) Geoff Aaron (Beta); 2) (United States) Ryan Young (Gas Gas); 3) (United States) Ray Peters (Aprilia)	1) (United States) Ronald Schmelzle (Beta); 2) (United States) Jack Stites (Gas Gas); 3) (United States) Steve Clark (Scorpa)	
1995	1) (United States) Geoff Aaron (Beta); 2) (United States) Ryan Young (Gas Gas); 3) (Belgium) Olivier Clamagirand (Fantic)	1) (United States) Ron Commo II; 2) (United States) Kenny Leduc; 3) (United States) Chris Bardell	
1996	1) (United States) Geoff Aaron (Beta); 2) (United States) Ryan Young; 3) (United States) Ray Peters (Scorpa)	1) (United States) Ron Commo II (Beta); 2) (United States) Kenny Leduc; 3) (United States) Chris Bardell	
1997	1) (United States) Geoff Aaron (Beta); 2) (United States) Ray Peters (Gas Gas); 3) (United States) Jess Kempkes (Gas Gas)	1) (United States) Ron Commo II	
1998	1) (United States) Geoff Aaron (Beta); 2) (Canada) Ryon Bell; 3) (United States) Ray Peters	1) (United States) Mark Manniko; 2) (United States) Ron Commo II; 3) (United States) Chuck Sutton	1) (United States) Laura Bussing; 2) (Norway) Erica Lund; 3) (United States) Andrea Davis
1999	1) (Finland) Tommi Ahvala (Gas Gas); 2) (United States) Geoff Aaron (Beta); 3) (United States) Ray Peters (Sherco)	1) (United States) Mark Manniko (Gas Gas); 2) (United States) Ron Commo II (Beta); 3) (United States) Jason Carpenter (Gas Gas)	1) (Canada) Christy Williams (Gas Gas); 2) (United States) Pam Debruin (Montesa); 3) (United States) Andrea Davis (Gas Gas)
2000	1) (United States) Geoff Aaron (Gas Gas); 2) (Canada) Ryon Bell (Montesa); 3) (United States) Ray Peters (Sherco)	1) (United States) Dennis Sweeten (Montesa); 2) (United States) Ron Commo II (Beta); 3) (United States) Chuck Sutton (Gas Gas)	1) (Canada) Christy Williams (Montesa); 2) (Canada) Kerry Williams (Gas Gas); 3) (United States) Pam Debruin (Montesa)
2001	1) (Belgium) Fred Crosset (Gas Gas); 2) (United States) Geoff Aaron (Gas Gas); 3) (Canada) Ryon Bell (Montesa)	1) (United States) Ron Commo II (Beta); 2) (United States) Brad Villand (Sherco); 3) (United States) Todd Roper (Beta)	1) (Canada) Christy Williams (Montesa); 2) (Canada) Kerry Williams (Gas Gas); 3) (Norway) Siri Minken (Gas Gas)
2002	1) (Belgium) Fred Crosset (Gas Gas); 2) (United States) Geoff Aaron (Gas Gas); 3) (Canada) Ryon Bell (Montesa)	1) (United States) Jesse Wellenstein (Gas Gas); 2) (United States) Chuck Sutton (Montesa); 3) (United States) Brad Villand (Sherco)	1) (Canada) Kerry Williams (Gas Gas); 2) (United States) Andrea Davis (Sherco); 3) (United States) Laura Bussing (Gas Gas)
2003	1) (United States) Geoff Aaron (Gas Gas); 2) (Canada) Ryon Bell (Gas Gas); 3) (Canada) Wilson Craig (Gas Gas)	1) (United States) Cody Webb (Gas Gas); 2) (Canada) Sean Bird (Gas Gas); 3) (United States) Chad White (Gas Gas)	1) (Canada) Christy Williams (Gas Gas); 2) (Canada) Kerry Williams (Gas Gas); 3) (United States) Nicole Bradford (Gas Gas)
2004	1) (United States) Geoff Aaron (Gas Gas); 2) (Canada) Ryon Bell (Gas Gas); 3) (United States) Chris Florin (Montesa)	1) (United States) Ray Peters (Beta); 2) (United States) Keith Wineland (Gas Gas); 3) (Canada) Sean Bird (Sherco)	1) (Canada) Christy Williams (Gas Gas); 2) (Canada) Kerry Williams (Gas Gas); 3) (United States) Louise Forsley (Sherco)
2005	1) (United States) Geoff Aaron (Gas Gas); 2) (South Africa) Bruce LeRiche (Sherco); 3) (United States) Chris Florin (Gas Gas)	1) (United States) Ray Peters (Beta); 2) (United States) Travis Fox (Sherco); 3) (United States) Patrick Smage (Sherco)	1) (Canada) Christy Williams (Gas Gas); 2) (United States) Louise Forsley (Sherco); 3) (Canada) Kerry Williams (Gas Gas)
2006	1) (United States) Geoff Aaron (Gas Gas); 2) (United States) Cody Webb (Sherco); 3) (South Africa) Bruce LeRiche (Sherco)	1) (United States) Ray Peters (Beta); 2) (United States) Will Ibsen (Sherco); 3) (Guatemala) Diego Ordonez (Sherco)	1) (Canada) Kerry Williams (Gas Gas); 2) (United States) Caroline Altman (Sherco); 3) (United States) Sarah Duke (Gas Gas)
2007	1) (United States) Patrick Smage (Sherco); 2) (United States) Cody Webb (Sherco); 3) (United States) Chris Florin (Sherco)	1) (United States) Ray Peters (Beta); 2) (United States) Bailey Tucker (Gas Gas); 3) (Japan) Daiki Watanabe (Sherco)	1) (Canada) Kerry Williams (Montesa); 2) (United States) Sarah Duke (Gas Gas); 3) (United States) Caroline Altman (Sherco)
2008	1) (United States) Patrick Smage (Sherco); 2) (United States) Cody Webb (Sherco); 3) (United States) Will Ibsen (Gas Gas)	1) (United States) Ray Peters (Beta); 2) (United States) Bailey Tucker (Gas Gas); 3) (United States) Ron Commo III (Beta)	1) (Canada) Christy Williams (Montesa); 2) (United States) Sarah Duke (Gas Gas); 3) (United States) Caroline Allen (Gas Gas)
2009	1) (United States) Patrick Smage (Sherco); 2) (United States) Cody Webb (Sherco); 3) (United States) Will Ibsen (Gas Gas)	1) (United States) Ray Peters (Beta); 2) (United States) Max Nelson (Gas Gas); 3) (United States) Andrew Oldar (Sherco)	1) (Canada) Christy Williams (Montesa); 2) (United States) Sarah Duke (Gas Gas); 3) (United States) Caroline Allen (Gas Gas)
2010	1) (United States) Cody Webb (Gas Gas); 2) (United States) Patrick Smage (Sherco); 3) (United States) Keith Wineland (Gas Gas)	1) (United States) Ray Peters (Beta); 2) (United States) Bryan Roper(Sherco); 3) (United States) Eric Storz (Gas Gas)	1) (Canada) Christy Williams (Montesa); 2) (United States) Caroline Allen (Gas Gas); 3) (Canada) Kerry Williams (Montesa)
2011	1) (United States) Patrick Smage (Sherco); 2) (United States) Cody Webb (Beta); 3) (United States) Keith Wineland (Gas Gas)	1) (United States) Logan Bolopue (Sherco); 2) (United States) Ray Peters (Beta); 3) (United States) Max Nelson (Gas Gas)	1) (United States) Caroline Allen (Gas Gas); 2) (United States) Sarah Duke (Gas Gas); 3) (United States) Rachel Hassler (Gas Gas)
2012	1) (United States) Patrick Smage (Sherco); 2) (United States) Cody Webb (Beta); 3) (United States) Keith Wineland (Gas Gas)	1) (United States) Ray Peters (Beta); 2) (United States) Chase Harker (Sherco); 3) (United States) Nathan Hassler (Gas Gas)	1) (United States) Rachel Hassler (Gas Gas); 2) (United States) Caroline Allen (Gas Gas); 3) (United States) Sarah Duke (Gas Gas)
2013	1) (United States) Patrick Smage (Sherco); 2) (United States) Bryan Roper (Sherco); 3) (United States) Logan Bolopue (Sherco)	1) (United States) Ray Peters (Beta); 2) (United States) Daniel Blanc-Gonnet (Sherco); 3) (United States) Samuel Fastle (Sherco)	1) (United States) Caroline Allen (Gas Gas); 2) (United States) Rachel Hassler (Gas Gas)
2014	1) (United States) Patrick Smage (Sherco); 2) (Czech Republic) Martin Matejicek (Gas Gas); 3) (United States) Logan Bolopue (Sherco)	1) (United States) Ray Peters (Beta); 2) (United States) Andrew Putt (Sherco); 3) (Austria) Alexander Niederer	1) (United States) Rachel Hassler (Gas Gas); 2) (United States) Caroline Altman (Gas Gas); 3) (United States) Madeleine Hoover (Gas Gas)
2015	1) (United States) Patrick Smage (Sherco); 2) (United States) Andrew Putt (Sherco); 3) (United States) Bryan Roper (Sherco)	1) (United States) Quinn Wentzel (Scorpa); 2) (United States) Drew Fortner (Gas Gas); 3) (United States) Andrew Oldar (Montesa)	1) (United States) Rachel Hassler (Gas Gas); 2) (United States) Madeleine Hoover (Gas Gas); 3) (United States) Caroline Altman (Gas Gas)
2016	1) (Spain) Marc Freixa (Montesa); 2) (United States) Patrick Smage (Sherco); 3) (United States) Andrew Putt (Sherco)	1) (Austria) Andreas Niederer (Beta); 2) (United States) Aaron Thistle (Sherco); 3) (United States) Randy Gibson (Sherco)	1) (Canada) Christy Williams (Montesa); 2) (United States) Madeleine Hoover (Gas Gas); 3) (United States) Rachel Hassler (Gas Gas)
Year	Pro Series	Expert Series	Women's Pro Series
2017	1) (United States) Patrick Smage (Sherco); 2) (Spain) Marc Freixa (Montesa); 3) (United States) Andrew Putt (Sherco)	1) (United States) Alexander Myers (Scorpa); 2) (Austria) Andreas Niederer (Beta); 3) (United States) Drew Fortner (Gas Gas)	1) (United States) Madeleine Hoover (Gas Gas); 2) (Canada) Christy Williams (Montesa); 3) (United States) Kylee Sweeten (Sherco)
2018	1) (United States) Patrick Smage (Sherco); 2) (United States) Daniel Blanc-Gonnet (Gas Gas); 3) (Austria) Alexander Niederer (Gas Gas)	1) (United States) Josh Roper (Sherco); 2) (United States) Alexander Myers (Scorpa); 3) (United States) Micah Hertrich (Gas Gas)	1) (United States) Madeleine Hoover (Gas Gas); 2) (United States) Kylee Sweeten (Sherco)
2019	1) (United States) Patrick Smage (Sherco); 2) (Austria) Alexander Niederer (Gas Gas); 3) (United States) Karl Davis Jr (Scorpa)	1) (United States) Will Myers (Scorpa); 2) (United States) Micah Hertrich (Montesa); 3) (United States) Jerome Gregorowicz (Beta)	1) (United States) Madeleine Hoover (Gas Gas); 2) (United States) Kylee Sweeten (Sherco); 3) (United States) Louise Forsley (Scorpa)
2021	1) (United States) Patrick Smage (Sherco); 2) (United States) Josh Roper (TRS); 3) (United States) Alexander Myers (Scorpa)	1) (United States) Drew Fortner (Beta); 2) (United States) Jerome Gregorowicz (Beta); 3) (United States) Dalton Land (Vertigo)	1) (United States) Madeleine Hoover (Gas Gas); 2) (United States) Kylee Sweeten (Sherco)
2022	1) (United States) Patrick Smage (Sherco); 2) (United States) Josh Roper (TRS); 3) (United States) Daniel Blanc-Gonnet (Gas Gas)	1) (United States) Cole Cullins (Beta); 2) (United States) Dalton Land (Vertigo); 3) (United States) Dalton Dunman (Vertigo)	1) (United States) Madeleine Hoover (Gas Gas)
2023	1) (United States) Patrick Smage (Sherco); 2) (United States) Josh Roper (TRS); 3) (United States) Alexander Myers (Scorpa)	1) (United States) Ty Cullins (Gas Gas); 2) (United States) Coran Calvert (Vertigo); 3) (United States) Jerome Gregorowicz (Beta)	1) (United States) Madeleine Hoover (Gas Gas); 2) (United States) Kylee Sweeten (Gas Gas)
2024	1) (United Kingdom) Toby Martyn (Montesa); 2) (United States) Patrick Smage (Sherco); 3) (United States) Josh Roper (Gas Gas)	1) (Belgium) Jan Cardinaels (Gas Gas); 2) (United States) Murphy Aaron (Gas Gas); 3) (United States) Ty Cullins (Gas Gas)	1) (United States) Madeleine Hoover (Gas Gas); 2) (United States) Kylee Sweeten (Gas Gas); 3) (United Kingdom) Alicia Robinson (Beta)
2025	1) (Spain) Jorge Casales (Montesa); 2) (United States) Patrick Smage (Sherco); 3) (United States) Josh Roper (Gas Gas)	1) (Austria) Alexander Niederer (Beta); 2) (United States) Keith Wineland (EM); 3) (United States) Sherman Smith III (Beta)	1) (United States) Madeleine Hoover (Gas Gas); 2) (United Kingdom) Alicia Robinson (Beta); 3) (United States) Kylee Sweeten (Gas Gas)

== See also ==
- Trial des Nations
- Scott Trial
- FIM Trial World Championship
- FIM Trial European Championship
