= Kick Start (TV series) =

British motorcycle trials TV series

- Also known as: Junior Kick Start
- Genre: Game show
- Presented by: Dave Lee Travis (1979-80); Peter Purves (1981-92)
- Narrated by: Max King (1979-80); Mick Andrews (1980-84); Jack Stites (1984-90); John Lampkin (1991-92)
- Country of origin: United Kingdom
- Original language: English
- No. of series: 9 (Original); 9 (Junior)
- No. of episodes: 34 (Original; inc. 1 special); 36 (Junior; inc 2 specials)

Production
- Running time: 25 minutes
- Production company: BBC Birmingham

Original release
- Network: BBC1
- Release: 6 August 1979 – 17 August 1992

Kick Start is a British motorcycle trials game show that aired on BBC1 from 6 August 1979 to 17 August 1992. It was originally hosted by Dave Lee Travis from 1979 to 1980 and then it was hosted by Peter Purves from 1981 to 1992.

== Format ==
Trials were run against the clock. Riders on off-road motorcycles were required to run over obstacles such as logs, oil drums, rockeries, water troughs, walls, steep banking, cliff-faces and often a VW Beetle. Time penalties were incurred for putting a foot on the ground while tackling an obstacle or touching or knocking over specified parts of an obstacle (such as the "bunny hop").

== Transmissions ==
=== Original ===
| Series | Start date | End date | Episodes |
|---|---|---|---|
| 1 | 6 August 1979 | 20 August 1979 | 3 |
| 2 | 4 August 1980 | 18 August 1980 | 3 |
| 3 | 17 August 1981 | 20 August 1981 | 4 |
| 4 | 3 August 1982 | 24 August 1982 | 4 |
| 5 | 6 September 1983 | 15 September 1983 | 4 |
| 6 | 28 August 1984 | 31 August 1984 | 4 |
| 7 | 27 August 1985 | 30 August 1985 | 4 |
| 8 | 1 September 1986 | 4 September 1986 | 4 |
| 9 | 5 April 1988 | 8 April 1988 | 4 |
| Special | 1 June 1988 | | 1 |

=== Junior ===
| Series | Start date | End date | Episodes |
|---|---|---|---|
| Specials | 29 December 1980 | 26 December 1981 | 2 |
| 1 | 26 December 1982 | 4 January 1983 | 4 |
| 2 | 5 July 1984 | 26 July 1984 | 4 |
| 3 | 24 December 1984 | 28 December 1984 | 4 |
| 4 | 23 December 1985 | 27 December 1985 | 4 |
| 5 | 22 December 1986 | 26 December 1986 | 4 |
| 6 | 30 May 1989 | 2 June 1989 | 4 |
| 7 | 29 May 1990 | 1 June 1990 | 4 |
| 8 | 2 April 1991 | 5 April 1991 | 4 |
| 9 | 10 August 1992 | 17 August 1992 | 4 |

== Other media ==
A video-game inspired by the series called Kikstart was released for the Commodore 64 in 1985 by Mastertronic. It was also released for the Commodore 16 / Plus/4, and Atari 8-bit computers. According to the game's programmer, Shaun Southern, "The C64 version's name at least, was a shameless rip-off of the TV series."

== Theme tune ==
The theme tune to the series was "Be My Boogie Woogie Baby", performed by Mr. Walkie Talkie, a pseudonym used by the German singer Drafi Deutscher.

== Behind the scenes ==
Although Peter Purves presented the show for thirteen years he did very little work for it, claiming that each complete series was filmed in only one weekend.
