= Madeleine Hoover =

American motorcycle racer (born 1998)

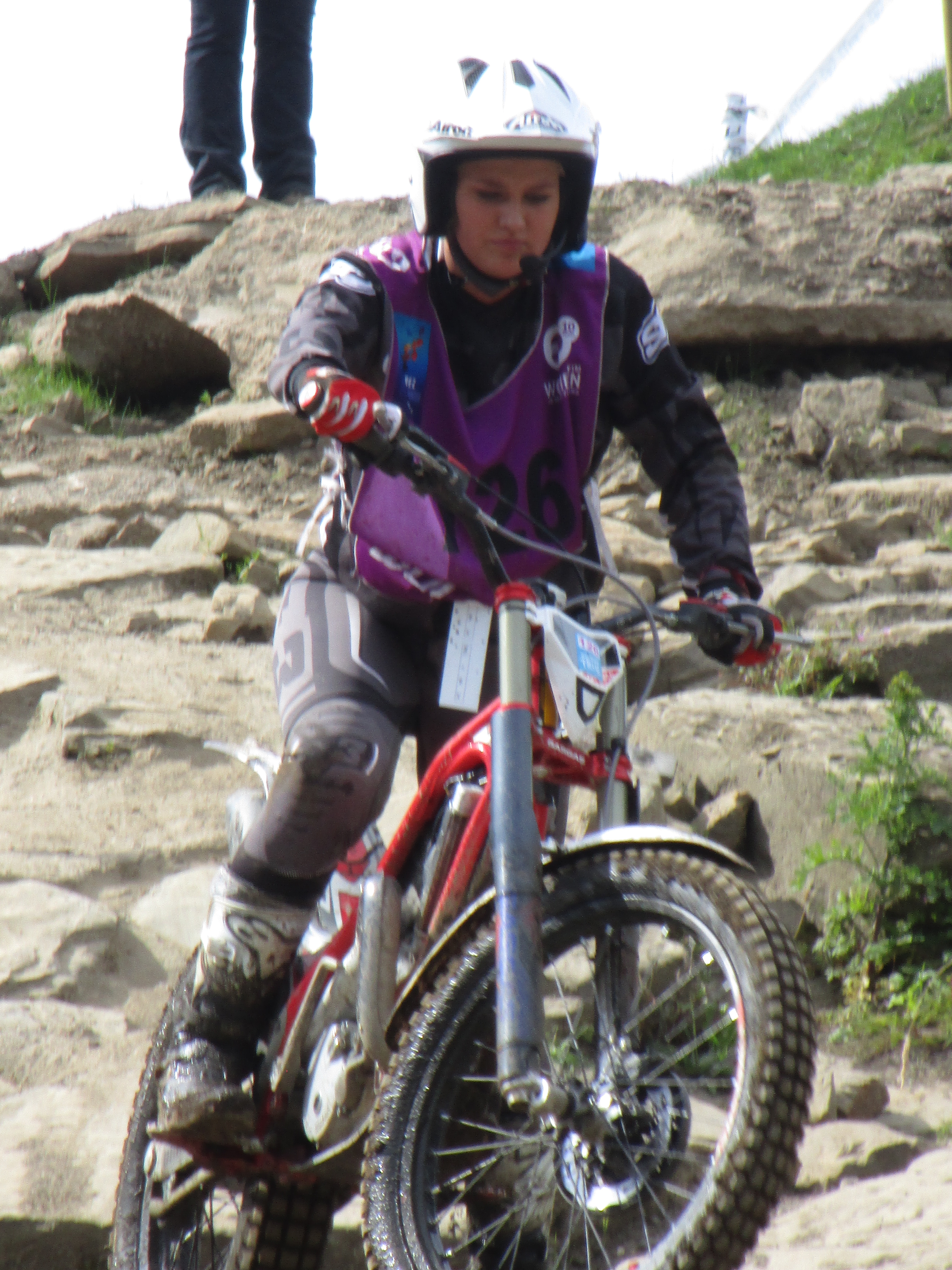
- FIM World Trials 2016 Tong, UK
- Nationality: (United States) American
- Born: December 17, 1998 (age 27); Raleigh, North Carolina, U.S.
- Current team: Gas Gas

Madeleine Hoover (born December 17, 1998) is an American women's International motorcycle trials rider.

Hoover has been a member of the American Women's Trial des Nations team several times and was a NATC Women's Pro Class Champion.

== Biography ==
Hoover was born in Raleigh, North Carolina.

In 2013, Hoover won her first NATC Trials Championship. She won the opening two rounds in New York, then took a second and a first place in Vermont. She won again in Arizona, and ended her season with a second place and a win in New Mexico. She took the title without contesting the final two rounds.

In 2014, Hoover took first place on the opening day in Colorado, and finished third on day 2. In Kansas, Hoover took the series lead with a win, and a second place finish. Hoover then won in Pennsylvania. At the final rounds in Tennessee, she won the championship title on the opening day with a win. She moved up to the Women's Expert Sportsman class on day two, taking a 3rd-place finish.

In 2015, Hoover won the opening two rounds of the Eastern series in Nebraska, following up with a second and a third in Ohio, which was enough to take her third title. In the Western series, Rachel Hassler prevailed over Hoover. Hoover came in second for the championship. She was selected for the 2015 Trial des Nations team with Hassler and Caroline Allen.

During the 2016 season, Hoover contested both the Women's FIM Trial World Championship and the NATC nationals. In the NATC East, Hoover took two second places in Florida and two third places in Tennessee, ultimately finishing third in the championship. In the Western series, she took second and third in Oregon, and two runner-up spots in Colorado. Hoover was second place in the championship behind Christy Williams.

In 2017, Hoover signed with the Gas Gas Factory team. The NATC added a Women's Pro class and Hoover claimed the title, winning seven of the eight rounds. Hoover competed in the newly added Women's Trial 2 class, taking a World podium and her first world championship points on the opening day with a third place, followed by a fourth place on day two. In Czechoslovakia, Hoover came in ninth two times and placed seventh in the championship. In Italy, she was part of the American Women's Trial de Nations team that took a sixth-place in the event.

Gas Gas USA announced that Hoover would be part of the US factory team for the 2018 season. Hoover took the 2018 NATC Women's Pro title, winning all eight rounds she contested. Competing in the FIM World Women's Trial 2 class, she came in second twice in Japan, third in France and sixth in England giving her second place overall in the World Championship.

== National Trials Championship career ==
Year	Class	Machine	Rd 1	Rd 2	Rd 3	Rd 4	Rd 5	Rd 6	Rd 7	Rd 8	Rd 9	Rd 10	Points	Pos	Notes
2012	(United States) NATC Clubwomen's		CA -	CA -	CO; 1	CO; 5	OH; 2	OH; 5	RI; 2	RI; 3			117	4th	
2013	(United States) NATC Women's		NY; 1	NY; 1	VT; 2	VT; 1	AZ; 1	AZ; 1	NM; 2	NM; 1	MN -	MN -	180	1st	NATC Women's champion
2014	(United States) NATC Women's	Gas Gas	CO; 1	CO; 3	KS; 1	KS; 2	PA; 1	PA; 1	TN; 1	TN -			150	1st	NATC Women's champion
2014	(United States) NATC Women's ES	Gas Gas	CO -	CO -	KS -	KS -	PA -	PA -	TN -	TN; 3			21	3rd	
2015	(United States) NATC East Women's ES	Gas Gas	NE; 1	NE; 1	OH; 2	OH; 3							85	1st	NATC East Women's ES champion
2015	(United States) NATC West Women's ES	Gas Gas	TX; 2	TX; 1	AZ; 2	AZ; 2	WY; 3	WY; 1					135	2nd	
2016	(United States) NATC East Women's ES	Gas Gas	FL; 2	FL; 2	TN; 3	TN; 3							71	3rd	
2016	(United States) NATC West Women's ES	Gas Gas	OR; 2	OR; 3	CO; 2	CO; 2							75	2nd	
2017	(United States) NATC Women's Pro	Gas Gas	TX; 1	TX; 1	KS; 1	KS; 1	OH; 1	OH; 1	RI; 2	RI; 1			210	1st	NATC Women's Pro champion
2018	(United States) NATC Women's Pro	Gas Gas	NM; 1	NM; 1	CO; 1	CO; 1	TN; 1	TN; 1	AR; 1	AR; 1	CA -	CA -	240	1st	NATC Women's Pro champion
2019	(United States) NATC Women's Pro	Gas Gas	NE; 1	NE; 1	MN; 1	MN; 1	CO; 1	CO; 1	OR -	OR -			180	1st	NATC Women's Pro champion
2019	(United States) NATC Expert	Gas Gas	NE -	NE -	MN -	MN -	CO -	CO -	OR; 6	OR; 6			30	9th	
2021	(United States) NATC Women's Pro	Gas Gas	PA; 1	PA; 1	OH; 1	OH; 1	AZ; 1	AZ; 1	NM; 1	NM; 1			234	1st	NATC Women's Pro champion
2022	(United States) NATC Women's Pro	Gas Gas	TN; 1	TN; 1	CA; 1	CA; 1	MN -	MN -					132	1st	NATC Women's Pro champion

== International Trials Championship career ==
Year	Class	Machine	Rd 1	Rd 2	Rd 3	Rd 4	Rd 5	Rd 6	Points	Pos	Notes
2017	FIM European Women's	Gas Gas	NED -	LET -	LET -	ITA; 9			35	17th	
2017	FIM World Women's Trial 2	Gas Gas	USA; 3	USA; 4	CZE; 9	CZE; 9			42	7th	
2018	FIM European Women's	Gas Gas	SPA; 8	POL -	POL -	ITA; 9	BEL; 6		125	10th	
2018	FIM World Women's Trial 2	Gas Gas	JAP; 2	JAP; 2	FRA; 3	GBR; 6			59	2nd	
2019	FIM European Women's	Gas Gas	ITA; 6	ITA; 2	FRA; 6	CZE; 3			255	3rd	
2019	FIM World Women's	Gas Gas	JAP; 10	JAP; 10	POR; 7	FRA; 9	SPA; 10		34	9th	
2020	FIM World Women's	Gas Gas	FRA; 5	FRA; 4	SPA; 4	SPA -	AND -	AND -	37	4th	
2021	FIM World Women's	Gas Gas	ITA -	ITA; 12	FRA; 11	SPA; 11	SPA; 12	POR; 12	22	13th	

== Honors ==
- US National NATC Women's Trials Champion 2013, 2014
- US National NATC Eastern Women's Expert Sportswoman Champion 2015
- US National NATC Women's Pro Trials Champion 2017, 2018, 2019, 2021

== See also ==
- NATC Trials Championship
- FIM Trial European Championship
- FIM Trial World Championship
