= Daniel Blanc-Gonnet =

American motorcycle racer

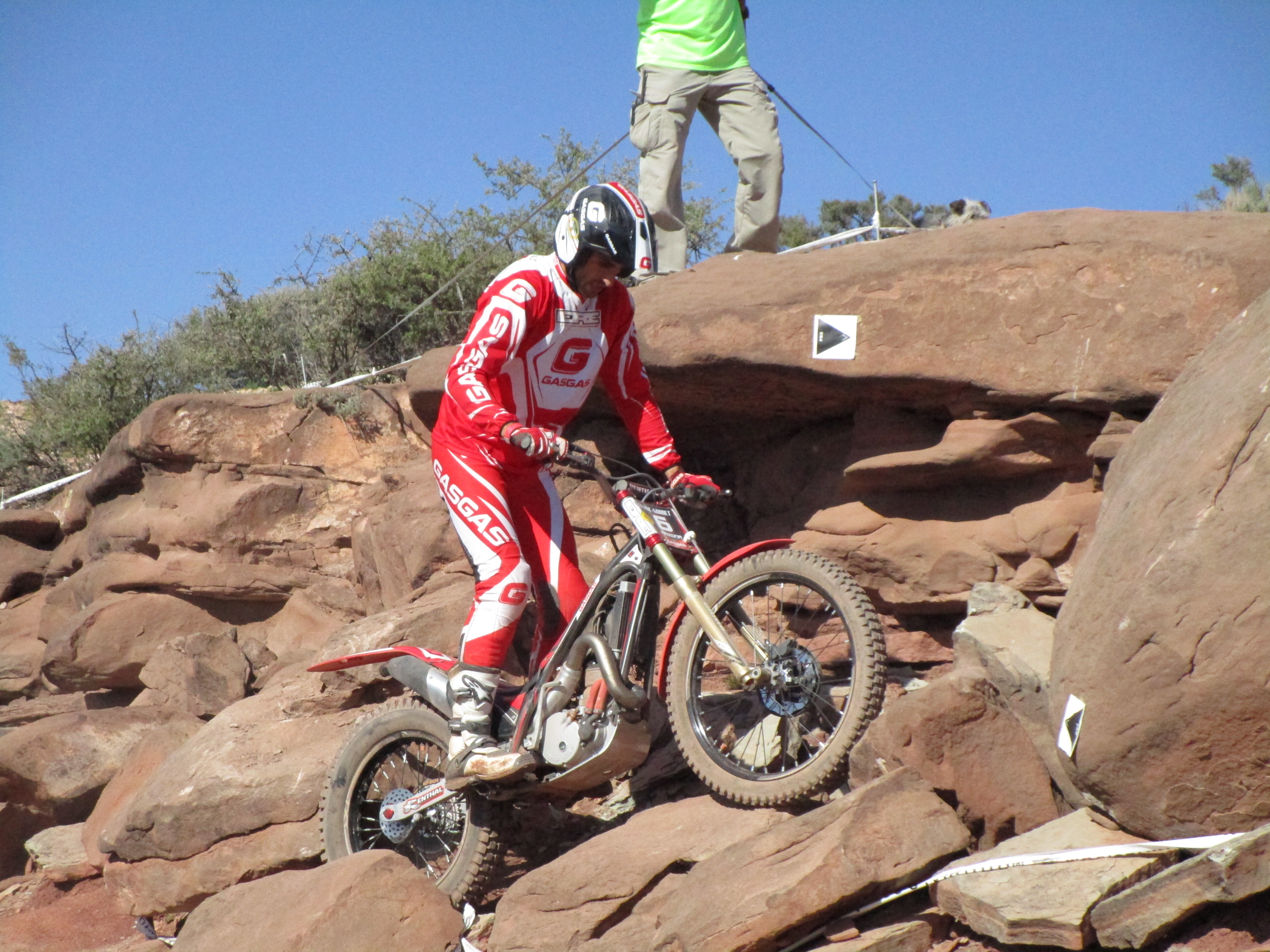
- Daniel Blanc-Gonnet
- Nationality: (United States) American
- Born: July 27, 1994 (age 32); Portland, Oregon, U.S.
- Current team: Gas Gas

Daniel Blanc-Gonnet (born July 27, 1994, in Portland, Oregon), is an American International motorcycle trials rider. Blanc-Gonnet was NATC National Trials Expert 125cc champion in 2011 and runner-up in the NATC Pro Championship in 2018.

== Biography ==
In 2011 Blanc-Gonnet became the 125cc NATC National Champion after taking 5 wins out of the seven rounds.

A move up to the Expert class was on the cards for 2012, and he made the most of it taking podiums in California, Ohio and both days at the end of season Rhode Island event. This was enough for fourth overall in the championship.

Making a good start to the 2013 season, Blanc-Gonnet placed second and third in New York. When the series moved to Vermont, he had a third on day one which was followed by a disappointing eighth on day two. But the season came around and good placings in Arizona, New Mexico and Minnesota brought him up to second place in the series. Blanc-Gonnet moved up to the NATC Pro class for the final event of the season, placing eighth.

2014 was Blanc-Gonnet's first full season in the Pro class and he rode well, finishing fourth overall.

Work commitments limited Blanc-Gonnet's 2015 season to only four rounds, but he got on the podium in both of the last rounds in Wyoming for a creditable seventh place series finish.

In 2016, Blanc-Gonnet signed for the factory Montesa team and was again seventh in the national series after facing some stiff competition all year. He joined fellow riders Andrew Putt and Brian Roper in the American Trial des Nations team in France where they placed 4th in the International Trophy class.

Blanc-Gonnet was one step higher in 2017 with sixth in the NATC Pro championship.

Gas Gas US announced that Blanc-Gonnet had been signed for their US factory team to compete in the NATC series. 2018 saw Blanc-Gonnet put in his best rides so far. He took runner-up positions in New Mexico, Colorado, Arizona and California, ending the season in second place behind Sherco rider Patrick Smage. Blanc-Gonnet also won the prestigious Colorado Ute Cup event for 2018 which has been held every year since 1970 by the Rocky Mountain Trials Association.

== National Trials Championship Career ==
Year	Class	Machine	Rd 1	Rd 2	Rd 3	Rd 4	Rd 5	Rd 6	Rd 7	Rd 8	Rd 9	Rd 10	Points	Pos	Notes
2009	(United States) NATC Highschool	Sherco	NE; 3	NE; 2	TN; 2	TN; 1	VT -	VT -	NY -	NY -			101	3rd	
2010	(United States) NATC Expert 125	Sherco	OK; 3	OK; 3	RI; 2	RI; 3	NY; 3	NY; 2	CO; 3	CO; 3	CA; 3	CA; 3	134	3rd	
2011	(United States) NATC Expert 125	Sherco	TX; 1	TX; 2	PN; 1	PN; 1	TN; 1	TN; 2	TN; 1				150	1st	NATC US Expert 125 Champion
2012	(United States) NATC Expert	Sherco	CA; 3	CA; 4	CO; 4	CO; 4	OH; 3	OH; 4	RI; 3	RI; 3			102	4th	
2013	(United States) NATC Expert	Sherco	NY; 2	NY; 3	VT; 3	VT; 8	AZ; 5	AZ; 4	NM; 6	NM; 3	MN; 2	MN -	131	2nd	
2013	(United States) NATC Pro	Sherco	NY -	NY -	VT -	VT -	AZ -	AZ -	NM -	NM -	MN -	MN; 8	13	9th	
2014	(United States) NATC Pro	Sherco	CO; 4	CO; 8	KS; 4	KS; 4	PA; 5	PA; 5	TN; 6	TN; 6			117	4th	
2015	(United States) NATC Pro	Sherco	TX -	TX -	AZ -	AZ -	NE; 5	NE; 5	OH -	OH -	WY; 2	WY; 3	78	7th	
2016	(United States) NATC Pro	Montesa	FL; 7	FL; 6	TN; 8	TN; 8	OR; 5	OR; 8	CO; 6	CO; 6			101	7th	
2017	(United States) NATC Pro	Montesa	TX; 5	TX; 6	KS; 7	KS; 6	OH; 6	OH; 5	RI; 6	RI; 6			121	6th	
2018	(United States) NATC Pro	Gas Gas	NM; 2	NM; 3	CO; 2	CO; 3	TN; 4	TN; 4	AR; 2	AR; 3	CA; 3	CA; 2	220	2nd	RMTA Ute Cup Winner
2019	(United States) NATC Pro	Gas Gas	NE; 8	NE; 9	MN; 4	MN; 2	CO; 2	CO; 4	OR; 4	OR; 4			147	4th	
2021	(United States) NATC Pro	Gas Gas	PA; 5	PA; 6	OH; 4	OH; 4	AZ; 4	AZ; 4	NM; 6	NM; 3			139	4th	

== Honors ==
- US National NATC Expert 125 Trials Champion 2011
- Ute Cup winner 2018

== See also ==
- NATC Trials Championship
- FIM Trial European Championship
- FIM Trial World Championship
