= Louise Forsley =

American motorcycle racer

- Nationality: American
- Born: 7 June 1988 (age 38); Greenfield, Massachusetts, U.S.

Louise Forsley (born 7 June 1990) is an International Women's motorcycle trials rider. Forsley rode the US NATC National Championships and the FIM World Trials Championships. Forsley is a two time Women's National Champion. She competed in the 2012 Xgames in Los Angeles, California and took home the silver medal.

== Biography ==
Forsley was born in Greenfield, Massachusetts, and grew up in Bernardston, Massachusetts. She finished third in the 2004 US NATC Women's Trials Championship behind the Canadian Gas Gas duo of Christy Williams and Kerry Williams. She was selected as part of the US Trial des Nations team and traveled to Spain along with Nicole Bradford and Debbie Evans Leavitt. The team finished eighth.

In 2005, Forsley went one better with a runner-up position behind Christy Williams. Once more, Forsley was selected for the US Women's Trial des Nations team, this time the event was held in Italy. The team of Forsley, Bradford and Sarah Duke finished in ninth place.

For the next several years, Forsley concentrated on riding the FIM Trial World Championship with a best result of fifth place in Spain during the 2008 Championship.

Forsley returned to US National competition in 2011, taking the NATC Women's Expert Sportsman Championship after remaining unbeaten all year, putting together the perfect season, a feat she repeated the following year.

== National Trials Championship Career ==
Year	Class	Machine	Rd 1	Rd 2	Rd 3	Rd 4	Rd 5	Rd 6	Rd 7	Rd 8	Rd 9	Rd 10	Rd 11	Rd 12	Rd 13	Points	Pos	Notes
2003	(United States) NATC Women's	Scorpa	CA; 6	CA; 5	WA -	WA -	OR -	OR -	PA; 3	PA; 3	RI; 4	RI; 4	WY; 7	WY; 5	CA -	125	4th	
2004	(United States) NATC Women's	Sherco	TN; 2	TN; 2	CO; 3	CO; 3	CA; 1	OH; 2	OH; 3	VT; 1	VT; 2					135	3rd	
2005	(United States) NATC Women's	Sherco	TX; 3	TX; 2	TN; 2	TN; 2	CO; 2	CO; 1	CA; 3	CA; 3	VT; 1	VT; 1	NY -	NY -		190	2nd	
2006	(United States) NATC Women's Expert Sportsman	Sherco	AZ; 1	AZ; 1	OK; 1	OK; 2	TN; 1	TN -	RI -	RI -						145	1st	NATC Women's ES Champion
2009	(United States) NATC Expert	Gas Gas	NE; 7	NE; 7	TN; 6	TN -	VT; 7	VT -	NY; 10	NY; 8						70	7th	
2011	(United States) NATC Women's Expert Sportsman	Sherco	TX; 1	TX; 1	PA; 1	PA; 1	TN; 1	TN; 1	TN; 1							150	1st	NATC Women's ES Champion
2012	(United States) NATC Women's Expert Sportsman	Sherco	CA; 1	CA; 1	CO; 1	CO; 1	OH; 1	OH; 1	RI; 1	RI; 1						150	1st	NATC Women's ES Champion
2019	(United States) NATC Women's Pro	Scorpa	NE -	NE -	MN -	MN -	CO; 2	CO; 2	OR; 1	OR; 1						110	3rd	

== FIM World Women's Trials Championship Career ==
Year	Team	1	2	3	Points	Rank
2004	Sherco	SPA; 15	SPA; 14		3	17th
2005	Sherco	ITA; 12	ITA -		4	15th
2006	Sherco	AND; 6	BEL; 8	FRA; 9	18	8th
2007	Sherco	CZE; 15	BEL -	GBR; 9	8	12th
2008	Gas-Gas	LUX -	SPA; 5	AND; 11	16	9th
2011	Sherco	GER -	CZE -	ITA; 14	2	19th

== Honors ==
- NATC Women's Expert Sportsman Trials Champion 2006, 2011, 2012

== Stunt Performance ==
Since 2015, Forsley has been doing theatrical and stunt performance as Black Widow for the show Marvel Universe Live!

== Related Reading ==
- NATC Trials Championship
- FIM Trial World Championship
