= Kerry Williams (motorcyclist) =

Canadian motorcycle racer

- Nationality: (Canada) Canadian
- Born: 7 September 1977 (age 49); Edmondson, Canada
- Current team: retired

Kerry Williams (born 7 September 1977 in Edmondson, Canada) is a Canadian former women's International motorcycle trials rider. Williams is a three-time US NATC Trials National Champion, winning the 2002, 2006, and 2007 titles.

== Biography ==
Williams competed in both Canada and the United States throughout her career. In 2000, she was runner-up to her sister Christy Williams in the American NATC Women's Trials Championship, winning the final two rounds. 2000 was also the first year that a women's championship was added to the annual Trial des Nations event, this year held in Spain. Kerry and Christy competed as the Canadian team, finishing a creditable fifth. Williams also picked up a tenth-place finish in Spain's FIM Women's Trials Championship.

2001 saw a repeat performance with another second-place finish in the NATC Women's Championship behind her sister and second place in the Canadian Women's Championship again behind Christy. They then teamed up to take on the world and scored another fifth place in the Women's TDN in France.

Williams dominated the 2002 NATC championship, winning all ten rounds and scoring her first US National title. Back home, she was runner-up to Christy in the Canadian Championship, and the pair headed to Portugal to contest the Trial des Nations, returning with a sixth-place team performance and a tenth-place finish in the World Championship round for Kerry.

The 2003 NATC season started brightly with a win at the California opening round, but a string of runner-up finishes meant that Christy pipped to the title at the end of the season. She also finished in 13th place in the San Marino world round.

Williams followed a familiar pattern and followed her sister home for a Canadian one-two finish in the 2004 NATC championship. The Canadian team of Kerry, Christy, and Heather Wall finished 6th in Spain for the Trial Des Nations. On the world scene, Kerry took 19th and 11th place in Spain, finishing 16th in the FIM Trial World Championship.

Williams slipped back to third spot in the 2005 NATC series after a season long battle with Christy and Louise Forsley, the highlight of the season was winning the final two rounds in Rhode Island. The Canadian TDN team was unchanged from the previous year and finished in seventh place in Italy.

Williams took control of the 2006 NATC championship from the opening round, winning all five rounds she competed in and taking the title ahead of Caroline Altman and Sarah Duke.

2007 was another stellar performance for Williams in the NATC championship. She again won all six rounds she entered. Colorado rider Sarah Duke was runner-up.

In 2009, Williams finished fourth in the NATC series.

Williams' final year in the NATC championship was 2010. She finished the season in third behind Christy and Caroline Allen.

== National Trials Championship Career ==
Year	Class	Machine	Rd 1	Rd 2	Rd 3	Rd 4	Rd 5	Rd 6	Rd 7	Rd 8	Rd 9	Rd 10	Rd 11	Rd 12	Rd 13	Points	Pos	Notes
2002	(United States) NATC Women's	Gas Gas	FL; 1	FL; 1	TX; 1	TX; 1	PA; 1	PA; 1	TN; 1	TN; 1	CO; 1	CO; 1				180	1st	NATC Women's champion
2003	(United States) NATC Women's	Gas Gas	CA; 1	CA; 2	WA; 2	WA; 2	OR; 2	OR; 2	PA; 2	PA; 1	RI; 2	RI; 2	WY; 1	WY; 3	CA; 3	190	2nd	
2004	(United States) NATC Women's	Gas Gas	TN; 3	TN; 3	CO; 1	CO; 2	CA; 3	OH; 3	OH; 1	VT; 2	VT; 1					140	2nd	
2005	(United States) NATC Women's	Gas Gas	TX; 2	TX; 3	TN; 3	TN; 3	CO; 3	CO; 3	CA; 2	CA; 2	VT; 2	VT; 2	NY; 1	NY; 1		185	2nd	
2006	(United States) NATC Women's	Gas Gas	AZ; 1	AZ; 1	OK; 1	OK; 1	TN; 1	TN -	RI -	RI -						150	1st	NATC Women's champion
2007	(United States) NATC Women's	Montesa	CO; 1	CO; 1	TN -	TN -	OH -	OH -	CA; 1	CA; 1	MN; 1	MN; 1				180	1st	NATC Women's champion
2009	(United States) NATC Women's		NE; 2	NE; 2	TN -	TN -	VT; 3	VT; 3	NY; 2	NY; 3						117	4th	
2010	(United States) NATC Women's	Montesa	OK; 2	OK; 2	RI -	RI -	NY -	NY -	CO; 2	CO; 2	CA; 2	CA; 3				146	3rd	
2012	(United States) NATC Women's	Montesa	CA -	CA -	CO; 5	CO; 2	OH -	OH -	RI -	RI -						41	6th	

== International Trials Championship Career ==
Year	Class	Machine	Rd 1	Rd 2	Points	Pos	Notes
2000	FIM Women's	Gas Gas	SPA; 10		6	10th	
2002	FIM Women's	Gas Gas	POR; 10		6	10th	
2003	FIM Women's	Gas Gas	RSM; 13		3	13th	
2004	FIM Women's	Gas Gas	SPA -	SPA; 11	5	16th	

== Honors ==
- US National NATC Women's Trials Champion 2002, 2006, 2007

== Related Reading ==
- NATC Trials Championship
- FIM Trial European Championship
- FIM Trial World Championship
