= Rachel Hassler =

American motorcycle racer

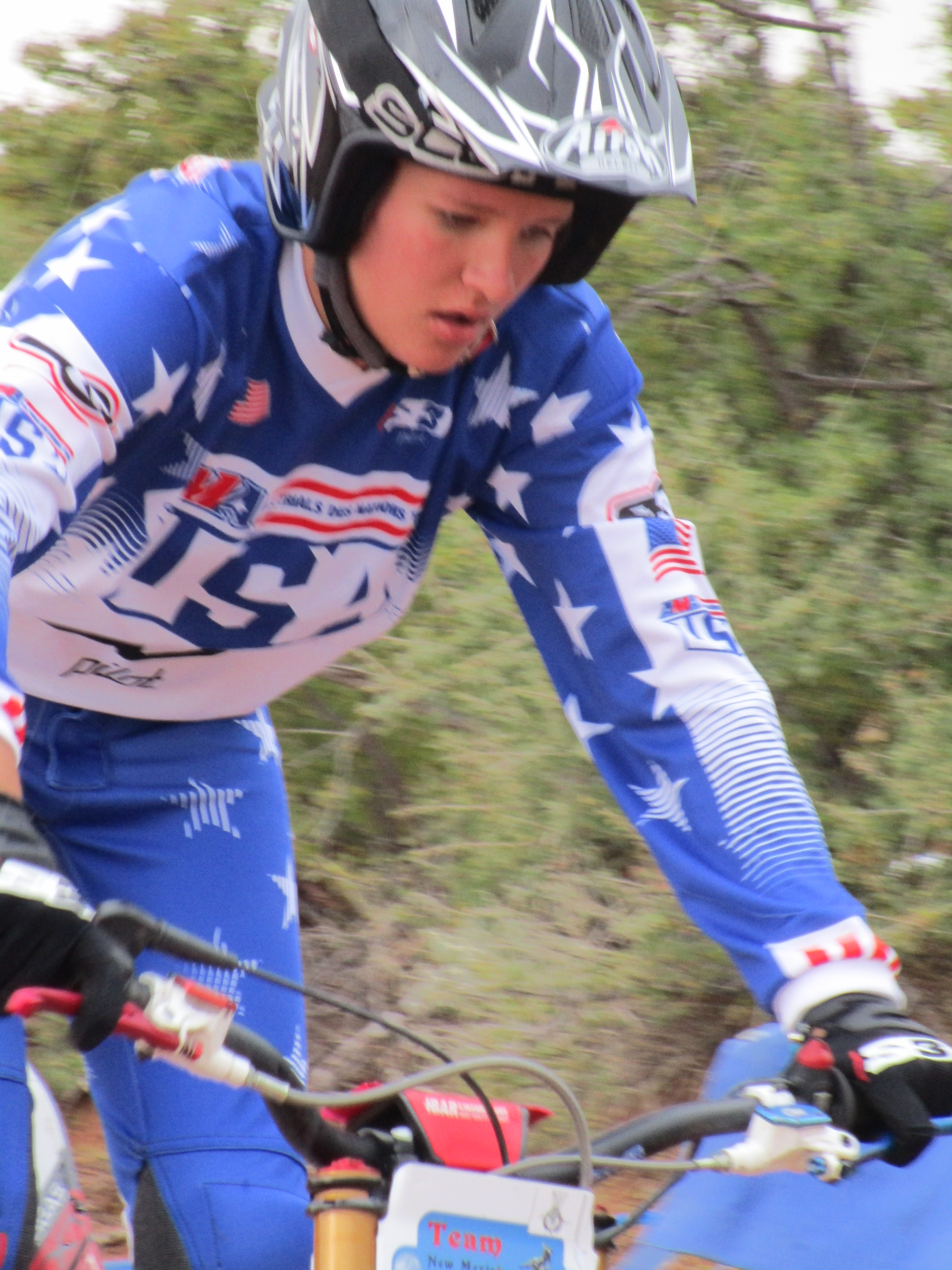
- Nationality: (United States) American
- Born: 22 May 1995 (age 31); Albuquerque, New Mexico, U.S.
- Current team: Gas Gas

Rachel Hassler (born 22 May 1995 in Albuquerque, New Mexico, United States), is an American women's International motorcycle trials rider. Hassler is a three time NATC Women's Trials Champion and member of the American Trial Des Nations team.

== Biography ==
Hassler first competed in the NATC Women's national series in 2010, scoring in all rounds and finishing the season in a creditable 4th place.

In 2011, Hassler went one better, ending the season in third place behind Caroline Allen and Colorado rider Sarah Duke.

The 2012 season started well for Hassler, a pair of wins at the opening two rounds in California set her up for a good season. Rounds 3 and 4 didn't go quite as planned but the title chase was back on track following a second place and a win in Ohio. The final two rounds in Rhode Island saw Hassler take another win and a runner up place to bag her first NATC Women's Title ahead of Caroline Allen. Hassler joined Allen and Louise Forsley in the American TDN team and competed in Switzerland finishing in fifth place.

After a move up to the newly added NATC Women's Expert Sportsman class, Hassler ended the 2013 season in runner-up spot behind Allen. She again competed in the Trial Des Nations event alongside Allen and Caroline Altman, this time the team finished in seventh place in France.

2014 was a clean sweep for Hassler after she won all eight rounds of the NATC Women's ES championship and took her second national title. This year the TDN was held in Andorra and the American team consisted of Hassler, Duke and Madeline Hoover. They put in a good performance and finished in eighth place.

After the series was split into East and West for the 2015 season, a repeat performance saw Hassler win the NATC West title ahead of TDN teammate Hoover, with Caroline Altman finishing in third. Hassler finished third in the East series with Hoover taking the title. At the Trial Des Nations held in Spain, the US team of Hassler, Hoover and Allen finished seventh.

== National Trials Championship Career ==
Year	Class	Machine	Rd 1	Rd 2	Rd 3	Rd 4	Rd 5	Rd 6	Rd 7	Rd 8	Rd 9	Rd 10	Points	Pos	Notes
2010	(United States) NATC Women's	Gas Gas	OK; 4	OK; 4	RI; 2	RI; 2	NY; 2	NY; 2	CO; 3	CO; 4	CA; 4	CA; 4	139	4th	
2011	(United States) NATC Women's	Gas Gas	TX; 2	TX; 2	PA; 3	PA; 3	TN; 4	TN; 3	TN; 4				113	3rd	
2012	(United States) NATC Women's	Gas Gas	CA; 1	CA; 1	CO; 4	CO; 5	OH; 2	OH; 1	RI; 1	RI; 2			145	1st	NATC US Women's Champion
2013	(United States) NATC Women's ES	Gas Gas	NY; 2	NY; 2	VT; 2	VT; 2	AZ; 2	AZ; 1	NM; 1	NM; 2	MN -	MN -	160	2nd	
2014	(United States) NATC Women's ES	Gas Gas	CO; 1	CO; 1	KS; 1	KS; 1	PA; 1	PA; 1	TN; 1	TN; 1			150	1st	NATC US Women's Expert Sportman Champion
2015	(United States) NATC Eastern Women's ES	Gas Gas	NE; 3	NE; 3	OH; 1	OH; 2							76	3rd	
2015	(United States) NATC Western Women's ES	Gas Gas	TX; 1	TX; 2	AZ; 1	AZ; 1	WY; 1	WY; 2					145	1st	
2016	(United States) NATC Eastern Women's ES	Gas Gas	FL; 1	FL; 3	TN; 2	TN; 1							85	1st	NATC Eastern Women's Expert Sportsman Champion
2016	(United States) NATC Western Women's ES	Gas Gas	OR; 4	OR; 2	CO; 3	CO; 3							67	3rd	
2017	(United States) NATC Western Women's	Gas Gas	TX; 2	TX; 1	KS; 1	KS; 1							90	1st	NATC Women's Champion

== Honors ==
- US National NATC Women's Trials Champion 2012, 2014
- US National NATC Western Women's Champion 2017
- US National NATC Western Women's Expert Sportswoman Champion 2015
- US National NATC Eastern Women's Expert Sportswoman Champion 2016

== Related Reading ==
- NATC Trials Championship
- FIM Trial European Championship
- FIM Trial World Championship
