= Patrick Smage =

American motorcycle racer

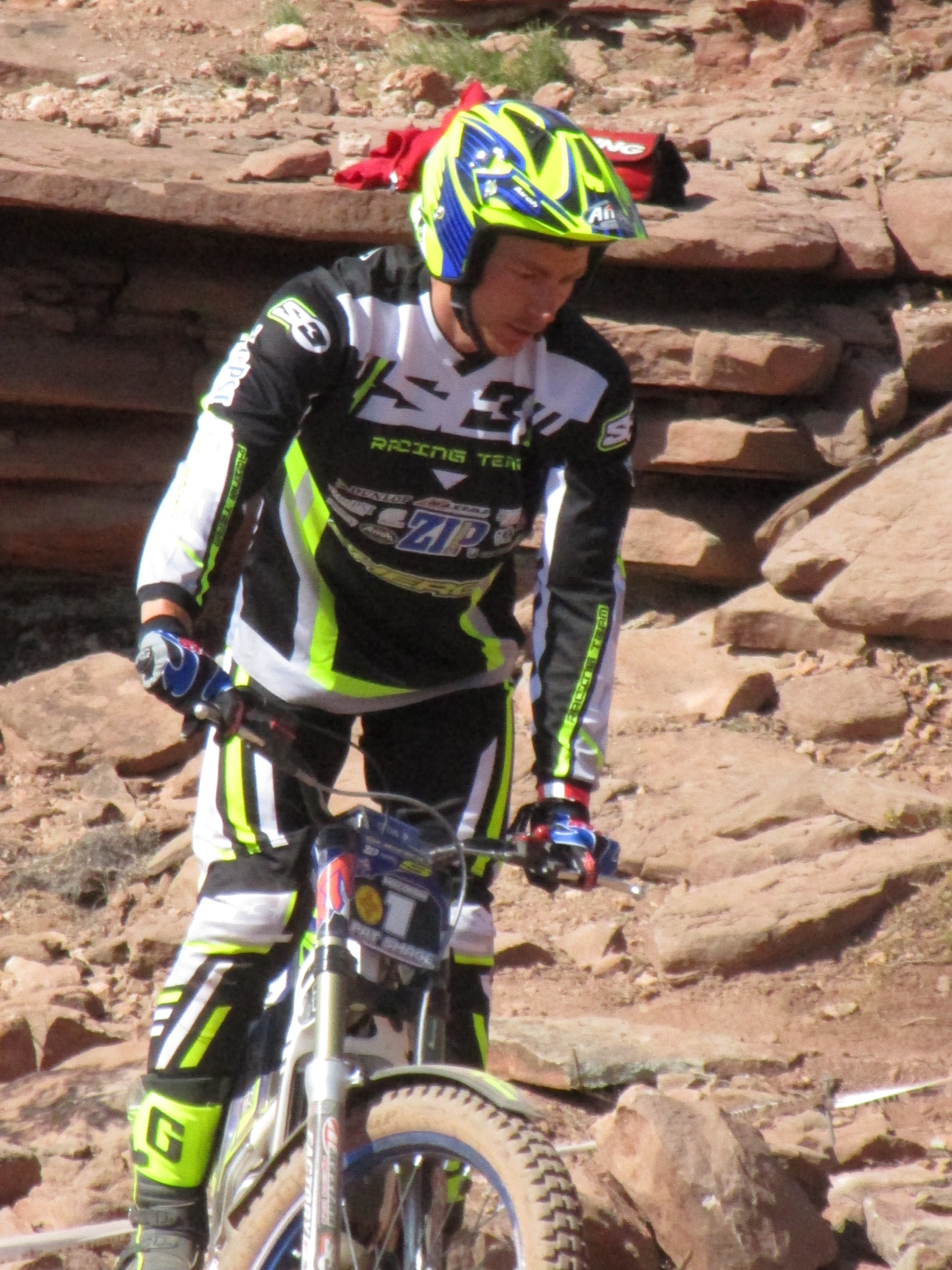
- Pat Smage (NATC Nationals Round 1 Roswell NM 2018)
- Nationality: American
- Born: 28 July 1990 (age 36); Elkhorn, Wisconsin, United States
- Current team: Sherco Factory Team

Patrick Smage (born 28 July 1990 in Elkhorn, Wisconsin, United States), is an International motorcycle trials rider. Smage is an 11-time United States NATC Trials Champion and is the current champion. He rides with his brother Phil Smage on the Smage Brothers Riding Shows. They competed on the sixth season of America's Got Talent in the middle of 2011 and made the finals finishing in the top-ten.

== Biography ==
Smage first won the NATC Pro Championship in 2007 and has dominated almost every year since. In 2010, he was knocked back into second place by Cody Webb but then regained his title in 2011.

At the start of the 2012 season, Smage won the El Trial de Espana event held by the SoCal trials association.

In 2016, Smage was again knocked back into second place by Marc Freixa.

At the end of the 2017 season, Smage claimed his ninth US national title after a win and a second place in Rhode Island ahead of Montesa rider Marc Freixa.

In 2018, Smage once again started the season with a winner at the El Trial de Espana event in Southern California. During the season, he won all ten events in the NATC schedule and captured his 10th National Championship.

== National Trials Championship career ==
Year	Class	Machine	Rd 1	Rd 2	Rd 3	Rd 4	Rd 5	Rd 6	Rd 7	Rd 8	Rd 9	Rd 10	Rd 11	Rd 12	Points	Pos	Notes
2004	(United States) NATC Expert	Sherco	TN -	TN -	CO -	CO -	CA -	OH -	OH -	VT -	VT; 3				21	23rd	
2005	(United States) NATC Expert	Sherco	TX; 4	TX; 4	TN; 2	TN; 4	CO -	CO -	CA -	CA -	VT; 3	VT; 1	NY; 2	NY -	155	3rd	
2005	(United States) NATC Pro	Sherco	TX -	TX -	TN -	TN -	CO -	CO -	CA -	CA -	VT -	VT -	NY -	NY; 6	15	9th	
2006	(United States) NATC Pro	Sherco	AZ; 7	AZ; 7	OK; 7	OK; 7	TN; 7	TN; 7	RI; 1	RI; 1					130	5th	
2007	(United States) NATC Pro	Sherco	CO; 1	CO; 1	TN; 1	TN; 2	OH; 2	OH; 1	CA; 1	CA; 2	MN; 2	MN; 1			255	1st	US NATC Pro Champion
2008	(United States) NATC Pro	Sherco	CO; 1	CO; 1	CO; 2	MN; 2	MN; 1	MN; 1							170	1st	
2009	(United States) NATC Pro	Sherco	NE; 1	NE; 1	TN; 1	TN; 1	VT; 1	VT; 1	NY; 2	NY; 2					205	1st	
2010	(United States) NATC Pro	Sherco	OK; 2	OK; 1	RI; 2	RI; 1	NY; 2	NY; 2	CO; 2	CO; 2	CA; 2	CA; 2			235	2nd	
2011	(United States) NATC Pro	Sherco	TX; 2	TX; 1	PA; 1	PA; 1	TN; 1	TN; 1	TN; 2						175	1st	
2012	(United States) NATC Pro	Sherco	CA; 1	CA; 2	CO; 1	CO; 2	OH; 1	OH; 1	RI; 1	RI; 4					200	1st	winner of 2012 El Trial de Espana
2013	(United States) NATC Pro	Sherco	NY; 1	NY; 1	VT; 1	VT; 1	AZ; 1	AZ; 1	NM; 1	NM; 1	MN; 2	MN; 1			270	1st	
2014	(United States) NATC Pro	Sherco	CO; 1	CO; 1	KS; 1	KS; 1	PA; 1	PA; 1	TN; 3	TN; 2					205	1st	
2015	(United States) NATC Pro	Sherco	TX; 1	TX; 1	AZ; 1	AZ; 1	NE; 1	NE; 1	OH; 1	OH; 1	WY -	WY -			240	1st	
2016	(United States) NATC Pro	Sherco	FL; 1	FL; 2	TN; 1	TN; 2	OR; 2	OR; 2	CO; 3	CO; 2					185	2nd	
2017	(United States) NATC Pro	Sherco	TX; 2	TX; 1	KS; 1	KS; 1	OH; 2	OH; 1	RI; 1	RI; 2					225	1st	
2018	(United States) NATC Pro	Sherco	NM; 1	NM; 1	CO; 1	CO; 1	TN; 1	TN; 1	AR; 1	AR; 1	CA; 1	CA; 1			200	1st	winner of 2018 El Trial de Espana
2019	(United States) NATC Pro	Sherco	NE; 1	NE; 1	MN; 1	MN; 1	CO; 1	CO; 1	OR; 1	OR; 1					240	1st	
2021	(United States) NATC Pro	Sherco	PA; 1	PA; 1	OH; 1	OH; 1	AZ; 2	AZ; 2	NM; 1	NM; 1					244	1st	
2022	(United States) NATC Pro	Sherco	TN; 1	TN; 1	CA; 1	CA; 1	MN; 1	MN; 1							197	1st	

== International Trials Championship career ==
Year	Class	Machine	Rd 1	Rd 2	Rd 3	Rd 4	Rd 5	Rd 6	Rd 7	Rd 8	Rd 9	Rd 10	Rd 11	Rd 12	Rd 13	Points	Pos	Notes
2009	FIM Junior Championship	Sherco	IRL; 12	IRL; 4	POR -	GBR -	GBR -	JAP -	JAP -	ITA -	AND -	SPA -	FRA -			17	17th	
2010	FIM Junior Championship	Sherco	SPA; 6	POR; 2	POR; 1	JAP -	JAP -	GBR -	GBR -	FRA -	RSM -	ITA -	CZE -			47	12th	
2013	FIM World Championship	Sherco	JAP -	JAP -	AUS; 12	AUS; 11	AND -	AND -	SPA -	ITA -	SPA -	GBR -	GBR -	FRA -	FRA -	9	19th	

== Honors ==
- US NATC Pro Trials Champion 2007, 2008, 2009, 2011, 2012, 2013, 2014, 2015, 2017, 2018, 2019

== Related Reading ==
- NATC Trials Championship
- FIM Trial World Championship
