= Scorpa =

Manufacturer of trials motorcycles

Scorpa S.A.
- Type: Public
- Industry: automotive industry
- Founded: 1993; 33 years ago
- Headquarters: Saint-Martin-de-Valgalgues, France
- Area served: Global
- Key people: Marc Teissier; Joël Domergue
- Products: Motorcycles
- Website: scorpa.fr

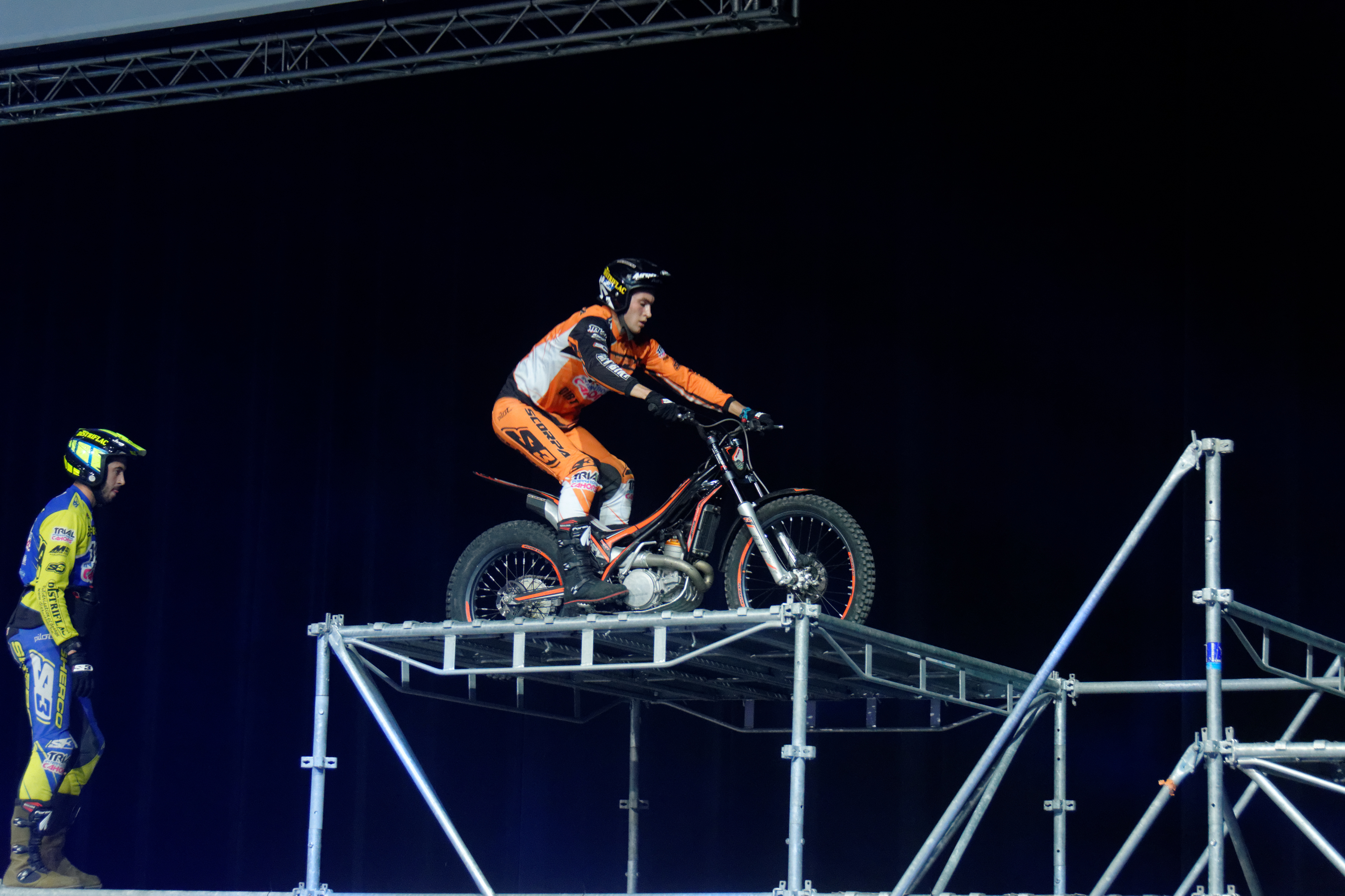

Scorpa is a manufacturer of trials motorcycles based near Alès, France. It was founded in 1993 by Marc Teissier and Joël Domergue. The first model produced by the company was the WORKS 294 in 1994, powered by a single-cylinder, two-stroke Rotax engine. In 1998, Scorpa signed an agreement with Yamaha Motor Company to use its engines in subsequent models.

The final range included trials bikes ranging from 125 cc to 249 cc, in both two- and four-stroke variants. Scorpa also produced "long ride" models, that were mechanically similar to the SY trials range, but with a larger fuel tank, and a seat to allow longer trekking use. Non-traditional models included the BMX-inspiried 4-Tricks and the trials/trail hybrid T-Ride.

On 13 July 2009 Scorpa announced on its website that it was going into bankruptcy liquidation.

In September 2009 it was announced that original owner Marc Tessier had purchased the company. Operations have moved from Ales to Nîmes, France, and a full complement of Trials models will be produced for 2010. These will include the TYS125 four-stroke, a 125 and 250 cc two-stroke SY, and a T-Ride model.

Scorpa has since been purchased by Sherco Motorcycles and continues to produce a range of 2 and 4 stroke trials motorcycles.
