= Christy Williams =

Canadian motorcycle racer

- Nationality: (Canada) Canadian
- Born: 14 August 1980 (age 46); New Westminster, British Columbia, Canada

Christy Williams (born 14 August 1980), is an international women's motorcycle trials rider. Williams is a four-time Canadian Women's Trials Champion and ten-time American NATC Women's Trials Champion.

== Biography ==
Williams was born in New Westminster, British Columbia, Canada. In 1999, Williams headed over the border into the United States to compete in the NATC Women's Trials Championship. She won the 1999 series ahead of American rider Pam DeBruin then returned to defend her title in 2000 and 2001, both years winning ahead of her sister Kerry Williams.

They repeated their one-two combination again in 2003 and 2004, then Christy won in 2005 ahead of Louise Forsley. Williams returned to take three more titles in 2008 until 2010.

In August 2017, Williams announced her retirement from national competition after 20 years, though she still plans on competing back home in Canada.

== National Trials Championship Career ==
Year	Class	Machine	Rd 1	Rd 2	Rd 3	Rd 4	Rd 5	Rd 6	Rd 7	Rd 8	Rd 9	Rd 10	Rd 11	Rd 12	Rd 13	Points	Pos	Notes
1999	(United States) NATC Women's	Gas Gas	TX; 1	TX; 1	CA; 1	CO; 1	CO; 1	OR; 1	OR; 1	PA; 1	PA; 1	WY; 1	WY; 1			180	1st	
2001	(United States) NATC Women's	Montesa	CA; 1	CA; 1	RI; 1	RI; 3	NY; 2	NY; 2	NM; 1	NM; 1	NE -	NE -				175	1st	Canadian Women's champion
2003	(United States) NATC Women's	Gas Gas	CA; 2	CA; 1	WA; 1	WA; 1	OR; 1	OR; 1	PA; 1	PA; 2	RI; 1	RI; 1	WY; 2	WY; 2	CA; 2	210	1st	
2004	(United States) NATC Women's	Gas Gas	TN; 1	TN; 1	CO; 2	CO; 1	CA; 2	OH; 1	OH; 2	VT -	VT -					145	1st	Canadian Women's Champion
2005	(United States) NATC Women's	Gas Gas	TX; 1	TX; 1	TN; 1	TN; 1	CO; 1	CO; 2	CA; 1	CA; 1	VT -	VT -	NY -	NY -		210	1st	
2006	(United States) NATC Women's Expert Sportsman	Gas Gas	AZ; 2	AZ; 2	OK; 2	OK; 1	TN; 2	TN -	RI -	RI -						130	2nd	
2008	(United States) NATC Women's	Montesa	CO; 1	CO; 1	CO; 1	MN; 1	MN; 1	MN; 1								150	1st	
2009	(United States) NATC Women's	Montesa	NE; 1	NE; 1	TN -	TN -	VT; 1	VT; 1	NY; 1	NY; 2						150	1st	
2010	(United States) NATC Women's	Montesa	OK; 1	OK; 1	RI -	RI -	NY -	NY -	CO; 1	CO; 1	CA; 1	CA; 1				180	1st	
2012	(United States) NATC Women's	Montesa	CA -	CA -	CO; 1	CO; 1	OH -	OH -	RI -	RI -						60	5th	
2015	(United States) NATC Western Women's ES	Montesa	TX -	TX -	AZ -	AZ -	WY; 2	WY; 3								46	4th	
2017	(United States) NATC Women's Pro	Montesa	TX; 2	TX; 2	KS; 2	KS; 2	OH; 3	OH; 3	RI; 1	RI; 2						176	2nd	

=== International Trials Championship Career ===
Year	Class	Machine	Rd 1	Rd 2	Rd 3	Points	Pos	Notes
1999	FIM European Women's	Montesa	ITA; 5			11	5th	
2000	FIM World Women's	Montesa	SPA; 6			10	6th	
2001	FIM World Women's	Montesa	ITA; 7			9	7th	
2002	FIM World Women's	Montesa	POR; 11			5	11th	
2003	FIM World Women's	Gas Gas	RSM; 10			6	10th	
2004	FIM World Women's	Gas Gas	SPA; 9	SPA -		7	15th	
2005	FIM World Women's	Gas Gas	ITA; 10	ITA -		6	14th	
2006	FIM World Women's	Gas Gas	AND -	BEL -	FRA; 12	4	17th	

== Honors ==
- Canadian Women's Trials Champion 2000, 2001, 2002, 2004
- US NATC Women's Trials Champion 1999, 2000, 2001, 2003, 2004, 2005, 2007, 2008, 2009, 2010

== Related Reading ==
- NATC Trials Championship
- FIM Trial European Championship
