= Motorcycle trials =

Offroad motor sports

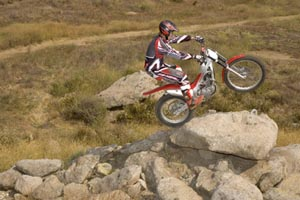
Montesa Cota 4RT

Motorcycle trials, also known as observed trials, often called simply trial or trials, is a non-speed event on specialised motorcycles. The sport is most popular in the United Kingdom and Spain, though there are participants around the globe.

Modern trials motorcycles are distinctive in that they have evolved to become extremely lightweight, lack seating (they are designed to be ridden standing up) and have suspension travel that is short, relative to a motocross or enduro motorcycle.

Motorcycle trials are often utilised by competitors in other motorcycle sports (such as enduro, motocross or road racers) as a way to cross-train, as trials require fine throttle, balance, and machine control.

== Characteristics ==
The event is split into sections where a competitor rides through an obstacle course while attempting to avoid touching the ground with their feet. The obstacles in the course may be of natural or constructed elements. In all sections, regardless of content, the designated route is carefully contrived to test the skill of the rider. In many local observed trials events, the sections are divided into separate courses to accommodate the different skill levels of riders, who compete in skill-rated classes.

In every section, the competitor is scored by an observer (hence the sport's name) who counts how many times the competitor touches the ground with the foot (or any other part of the body). Each time a competitor touches the ground with a foot (commonly called "dabs" or "prods"), the penalty is one point.

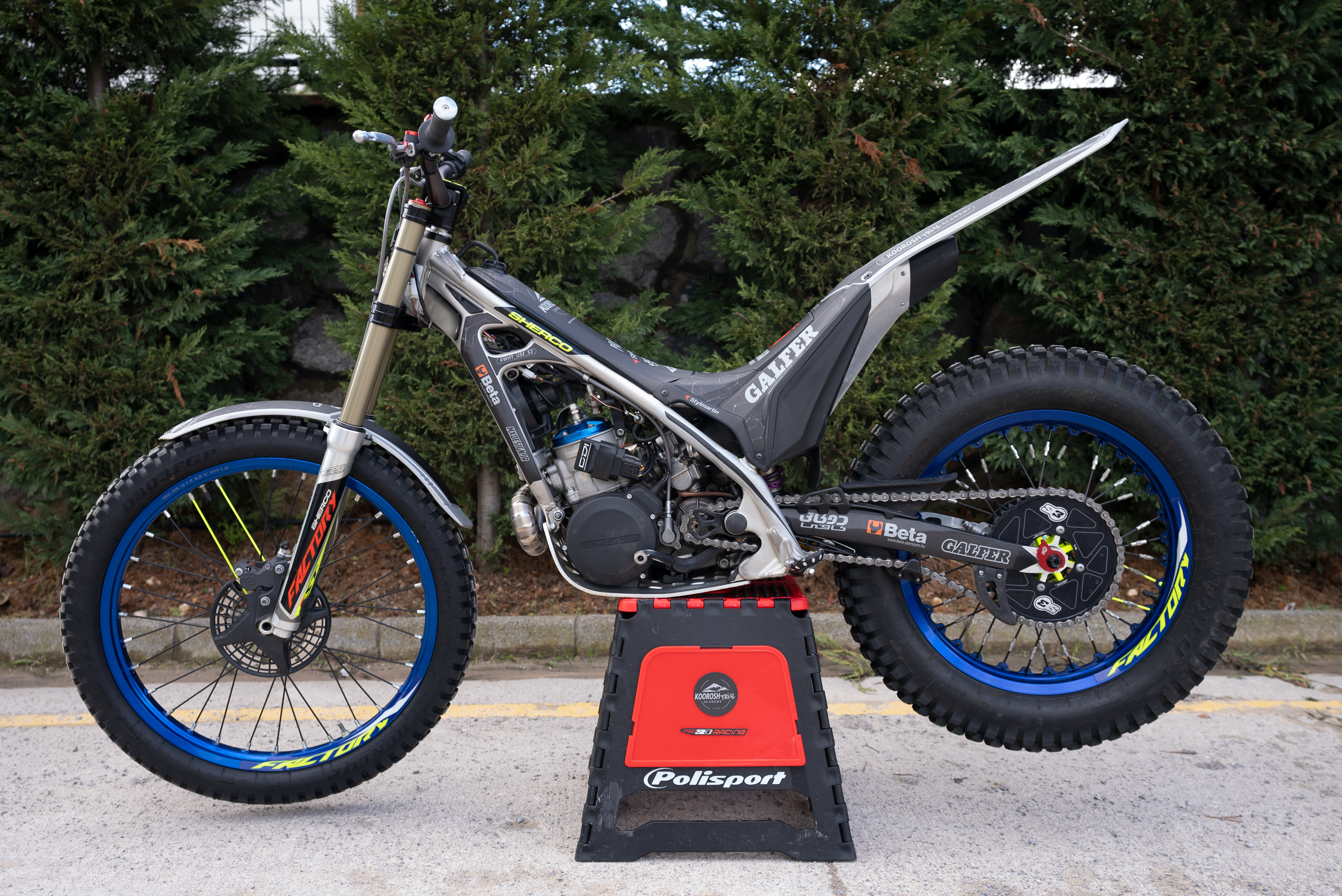
trial motorcycle

The possible scores in each section consist of 0, 1, 2, 3, or 5. If a competitor makes their way through the section without touching the ground with a foot, they earn a score of 0 (which is called "cleaning the section"). If they touch the ground once, they receive a score of 1. If they touch down twice, they receive a score of 2. If they touch the ground three or more times, they earn a score of 3—as long as they complete the section without stalling the motor, dismounting, going out of bounds, or going backward. If the competitor fails to complete the section, a score of 5 (sometimes colourfully called "a fiasco") is earned. The winner is the competitor with the fewest points at the end of the event. Some events are also timed with penalty points assessed to late riders.

=== Sidecar trials ===
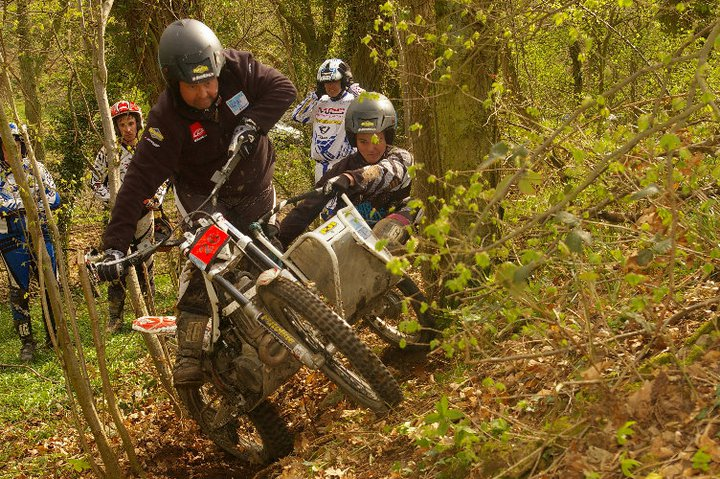
A sidecar trials bike competing in an observed section

As well as the traditional solo motorcycle trials, there is a form of the sport on three wheels, known as sidecar trials, consisting of a driver and a passenger. The competition is run in the same way as a standard motorcycle trial with the only exception being additional ways to be given a score of 5. This involves the passenger, who will earn the competitor a 5 if any part of the passenger's body touches any terrain. The role of the passenger is to balance the sidecar and prevent the sidecar wheel from lifting which would cause the driver to restablise the outfit by using his foot (incurring a score of 1).

Sidecar Trials is predominantly British; however, there are events run in Europe and Australia. The British Championship is the highest level of competition, held over 10 rounds with 3 difficulty levels: Clubman, Intermediate, and Expert, with the Expert class championship winner being named British Sidecar Trials Champion.

=== Long distance trials ===
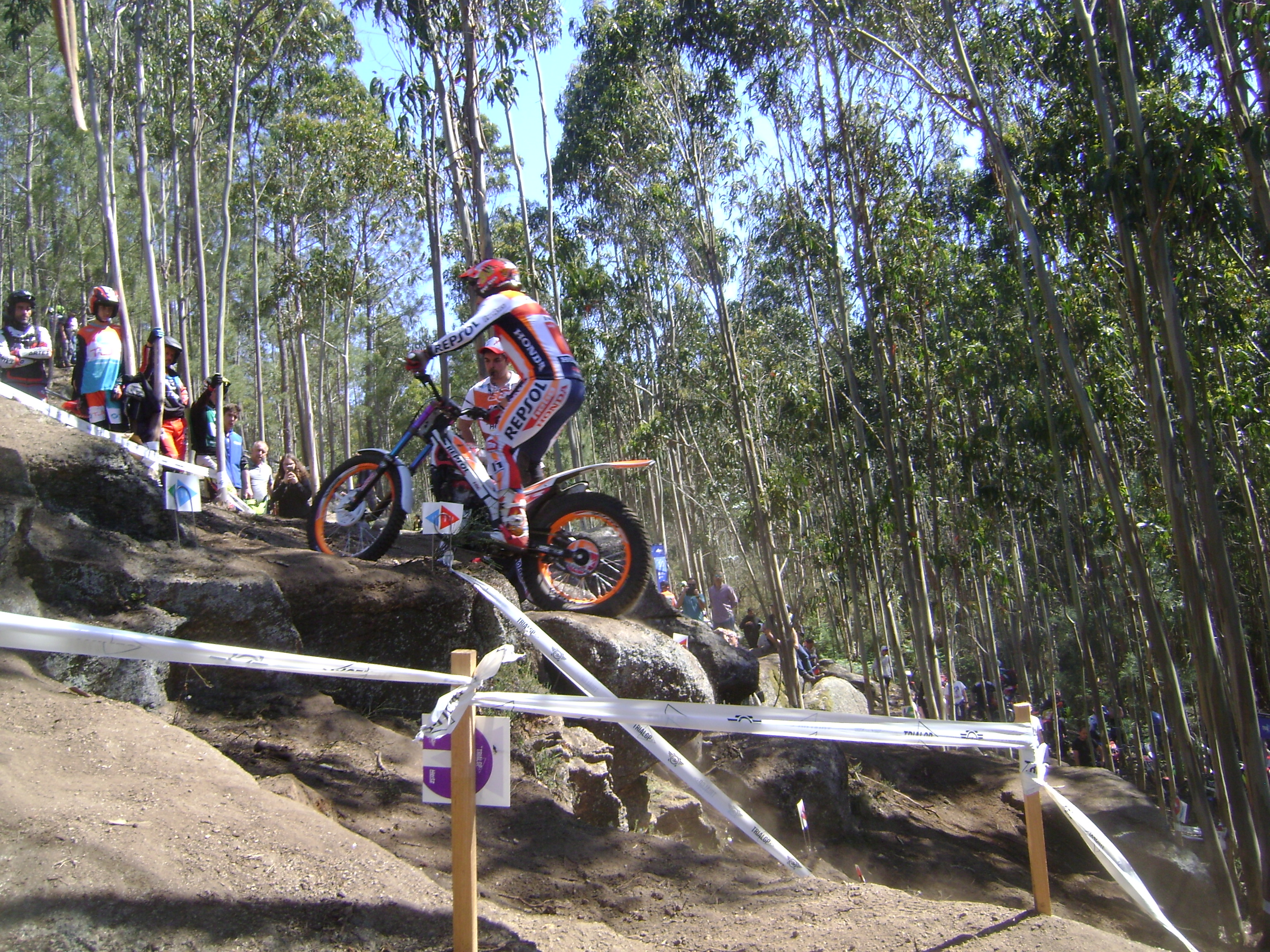
Trial in Arteixo, Galicia, Spain

Long-distance trials competitions involve a carefully planned route for competitors to follow, making stops at various locations over a broad area, rather than just one venue. These events take place on roads and off-road trails that may be steep, rough and loose-surfaced. Penalty points are given to competitors for putting their feet on the ground or falling off, for failure to complete a particular section, and for late arrival at a destination.

Some trials events cater to cars or vintage bikes in addition to modern motorcycles.

== Competitions ==
There is a world indoor and outdoor championship, as well as indoor and outdoor national team "world cups" (Trial des Nations). British competitor Dougie Lampkin is notable for winning seven world outdoor titles in the 1990s and 2000s, the same number that Spanish competitor Jordi Tarrés won in the 1980s and 1990s. Previous observed trials greats include Northern Ireland's Sammy Miller (1960s), Finland's Yrjö Vesterinen (1970s) and Belgium's Eddy Lejeune (1980s). The current outdoor world champion is Antoni Bou from Spain, who is also the current indoor champion. He has been the sole outdoor and indoor FIM Trial World Championship champion from 2007 to 2024. With these 36 world titles (18 outdoor and 18 indoor), he is the most successful rider in history, surpassing Dougie Lampkin (7 outdoor and 5 indoor) and Jordi Tarrés, who is third with 7 outdoor titles.

In addition to the world championship events, there are other major events, such as the Scottish Six Days Trial (SSDT) and the Scott Trial.

Classic classes exist for vintage bikes. Classes include pre-1965 or pre-1967 motorcycles (typically British), as well as newer vintage events for observed trials motorcycles with two rear shock absorbers. In most cases, twin-shock motorcycles were manufactured between 1967 and 1985 and are typically Japanese or Spanish. A recent addition has been a class for air-cooled monoshock bikes; this covers machines up to around 1990.

A competition event is called an "observed trial" or "trial" (not plural), unless referred to as an "observed trials event". A newer name for the sport, MotoTrial, is used by some organisations. However, it was recently dropped by the Federation Internationale de Motocyclisme as a name for its observed trials competitions. Outdoor events are called Trial, while FIM indoor events are called X-Trial.

== Manufacturers ==
Major current manufacturers of trials bikes are Gas Gas, Beta, Sherco, Montesa Honda, Scorpa, TRS and Vertigo. In the past there have been many manufacturers, from countries such as Spain, Japan, Britain and Italy.

== See also ==
- Mountain bike trials
- Gymkhana (motorcycle)
- Kick Start, a long running British television show
- Kikstart 2
- List of motorcycle trials champions
- List of motorcycle manufacturers
- Outline of motorcycles and motorcycling
- Trials (series)
- Truck trials
