= FIM Hard Enduro World Championship =

International off-road motorcycle racing competition

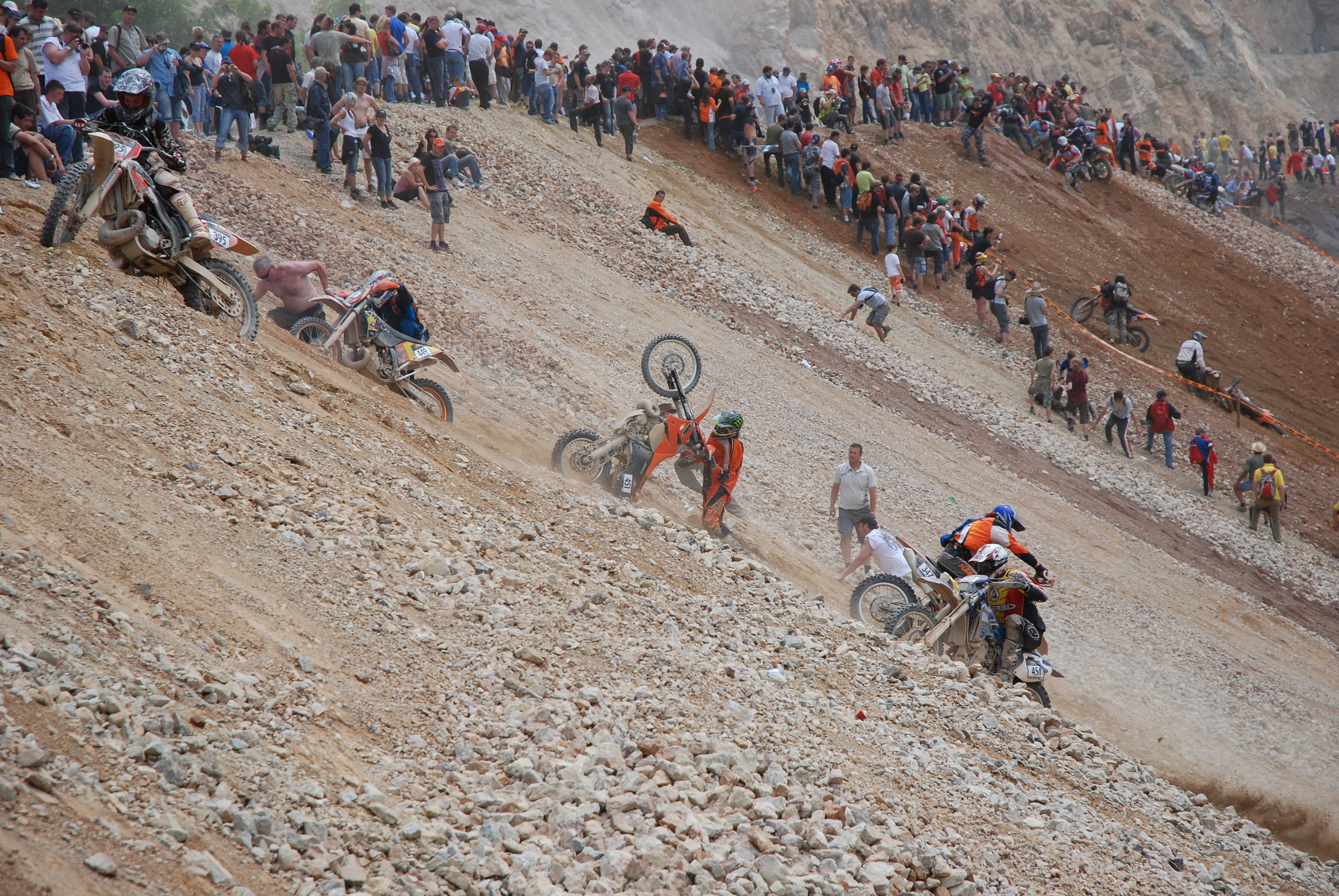
- Erzbergrodeo 2008
- Category: Motorcycle racing
- Region: International
- Inaugural season: 2021
- Official website: fim-hardenduro.com

The FIM Hard Enduro World Championship (HEWC) is the championship series for hard enduro, a variant of enduro off-road motorcycle racing. It began as the World Enduro Super Series (WESS) in 2018, before gaining FIM World Championship status and being renamed to the FIM Hard Enduro World Championship for 2021

It is one of the most challenging and brutal forms of motorcycling racing. The "track" is made up of natural or artificial elements (earth, sand, etc.), on which are found various, mainly natural, “obstacles” (hillclimbs, stones, tree trunks, stretches of water, etc.)

== History ==
The Championship began in 2018 as the World Enduro Super Series (WESS). Its aim is to form the most encompassing and true Enduro championship to date. Bringing together all disciplines of Enduro – Hard Enduro, Classic Enduro, Cross-Country and Beach Racing.

Billy Bolt won in the inaugural 2018 season.

The 2020 season was cancelled due to the COVID-19 pandemic.

The 2021 championship was won by Billy Bolt with the result going down to the last event of the season.

On February 28, 2025, WESS Promotions announced its withdrawal from the series due to loss of KTM as its main sponsor. This placed the 2025 season briefly in jeopardy until FIM announced ProTouchGlobal as the new promoter on April 24, 2025.

== Championship ==
=== Classes ===
There are no specific classes in FIM Hard Enduro and riders may compete on any bike that complies with the FIM Hard Enduro Technical Regulations.

=== Events ===
==== 2023 ====
- (Germany) GetzenRodeo (2019, 2021, 2023)
- (Austria) Erzberg Rodeo (2018–2019, 2022–2023)
- (Italy) Red Bull Abestone (2021–2023)
- (Canada) Red Bull Outliers (2022–2023)
- (Spain) Hixpania Hard Enduro (2019, 2021–2023)
- (Romania) Red Bull Romaniacs (2018–2019, 2021–2023)
- (Lesotho) Roof of Africa (2023)
- (Serbia) Xross Hard Enduro Rally (2022–2023)

==== Former ====
- (Spain) BR2 Enduro Solsona (2019)
- (Portugal) Extreme XL Lagares (2018-2019, 2021)
- (Sweden) Gotland Grand National (2018)
- (United Kingdom) Hawkstone Park Cross-Country (2018-2019)
- (Israel) Minus 400 (2022)
- (Poland) Red Bull 111 Megawatt / Hero Challenge (2018, 2021)
- (Netherlands) Red Bull Knock Out (2018)
- (United States) Red Bull TKO (2021–2022)
- (France) Trèfle Lozérien (2018–2019)

=== Points system ===
While pros and amateurs compete in Hard Enduro, only pros with FIM licences can score World Championship points, these are awarded as follows:

If the championship ends in a tie on points, the winner is decided by the majority of best placings.

Place	Points
1st	20
2nd	17
3rd	15
4th	13
5th	11
6th	10
7th	9
8th	8
9th	7
10th	6
11th	5
12th	4
13th	3
14th	2
15th	1

== Medalists ==
- 2018-19: World Enduro Super Series
- 2021-current: FIM Hard Enduro World Championship

Event	Gold		Silver		Bronze	
2018	Billy Bolt; Great Britain	Husqvarna	Manuel Lettenbichler; Germany	KTM	Nathan Watson; Great Britain	KTM
2019	Manuel Lettenbichler; Germany	KTM	Alfredo Gómez; Spain	Husqvarna	Jonny Walker; Great Britain	KTM
2020	Cancelled due to COVID-19					
2021	Billy Bolt; Great Britain	Husqvarna	Manuel Lettenbichler; Germany	KTM	Wade Young; South Africa	Sherco
2022	Manuel Lettenbichler; Germany	KTM	Mario Román; Spain	Sherco	Graham Jarvis; Great Britain	Husqvarna
2023	Manuel Lettenbichler; Germany	KTM	Billy Bolt; Great Britain	Husqvarna	Trystan Hart; Canada	KTM
2024	Manuel Lettenbichler; Germany	KTM	Wade Young; South Africa	Gas Gas	Mario Román; Spain	Sherco
2025	Manuel Lettenbichler; Germany	KTM	Billy Bolt; Great Britain	Husqvarna	Mitch Brightmore; Great Britain	Gas Gas
2026	Manuel Lettenbichler; Germany	KTM	Mitch Brightmore; Great Britain	Gas Gas	Teodor Kabakchiev; Bulgaria	Sherco
