= 2021 FIM Enduro World Championship =

The 2021 World Enduro Championship is the 32nd season of the FIM World Enduro Championship. The season consists of eight events.

Steve Holcombe goes into the championship after winning both the EnduroGP and Enduro 2 classes in 2020. Andrea Verona is the reigning Enduro 1 champion, with Brad Freeman going into the season after taking the Enduro 3 title the previous season.

ABC Communications stepped down from being the championship promoter at the end of the previous season, with the FIM taking direct control of the series for 2021.

== Calendar ==
A six-round calendar was announced in September 2020.

Round	Event	Location	Dates
1	Portugal	Marco de Canaveses	18–20 June
2	Italy	Edolo	25–27 June
3	Estonia	Saaremaa	16–18 July
4	Sweden	Skövde	22–24 July
5	Portugal	Santiago do Cacém	08–10 October
6	France	Langeac	15–17 October

== EnduroGP ==
=== Riders Championship ===
Pos	Rider	Bike	Class	POR (Portugal)		ITA (Italy)		EST (Estonia)		SWE (Sweden)		POR (Portugal)		FRA (France)		Points
1	(United Kingdom) Brad Freeman	Beta	Enduro 3	1	2	1	1	2	2	3	1	2	2	2	1	217
2	(Spain) Josep García	KTM	Enduro 2	3	4	3	5	1	1	2	4	1	1	1	3	199
3	(Italy) Andrea Verona	Gas Gas	Enduro 1	5	8	4	4	3	3	6	2	3	4	6	2	157
4	(Australia) Wil Ruprecht	TM	Enduro 2	4	1	2	2	5	5	1	5	8	Ret	5	9	146
5	(Italy) Davide Guarneri	Fantic	Enduro 1	7	6	7	6	4	4	4	3	6	5	12	8	125
6	(United Kingdom) Steve Holcombe	Beta	Enduro 2	2	3	8	3	7	8	21	17	5	6	3	5	119
7	(Spain) Jaume Betriu	KTM	Enduro 3	6	5	9	8	8	9	8	8	7	7	4	4	111
8	(New Zealand) Hamish MacDonald	Sherco	Enduro 2	9	7	6	7	6	6	7	6	11	11	13	7	96
9	(United Kingdom) Danny McCanney	Sherco	Enduro 3	8	9	12	15	12	7	14	14	9	10	15	11	56
10	(United Kingdom) Nathan Watson	Honda	Enduro 2									4	3	11	6	43
11	(Italy) Samuele Bernardini	Honda	Enduro 1	19	10	13	13	11	10	5	13	17	15	27	22	38
12	(Belgium) Antoine Magain	Sherco	Enduro 1	24	11	10	9	9	16	10	18	20	24	16	12	35
13	(United Kingdom) Jamie McCanney	Husqvarna	Enduro 3	11	16	11	18	13	12	9	12	12	14	18	15	35
14	(Italy) Thomas Oldrati	Honda	Enduro 2	10	Ret			17	19	16	11	10	8	10	14	33
15	(United Kingdom) Joe Wootton	Husqvarna	Enduro 2	14	21	35	14	21	17	19	9	14	18	7	10	28
16	(Finland) Eero Remes	TM	Enduro 2	12	14	19	Ret	10	13	12	26	16	16	23	26	19
17	(Italy) Davide Soreca	Husqvarna	Enduro 1	15	13	26	12	15	11	20	25	18	12	17	16	18
18	(United Kingdom) Billy Bolt	Husqvarna	Enduro 2			5	10									17
19	(Italy) Matteo Cavallo	TM	Enduro 1	Ret	DNS			16	20	Ret	Ret	13	13	8	13	17
20	(Sweden) Albin Elowson	Husqvarna	Enduro 2	22	22	24	36	24	23	11	7					14
21	(Spain) Marc Sans	Husqvarna	Enduro 3	25	25	32	33	29	22	30	21	24	9	21	17	7
22	(France) Theophile Espinasse	Honda	Enduro 1							22	22	21	Ret	9	Ret	7
23	(Sweden) Anton Lundgren	Husqvarna	Enduro 2	29	20	20	31	25	21	18	10					6
24	(France) Hugo Blanjoue	KTM	Enduro 2	16	Ret	16	11							Ret	DNS	5
25	(France) Christophe Charlier	Beta	Enduro 1	13	15	Ret	DNS	Ret	DNS			15	Ret	31	21	5
26	(United Kingdom) Jack Edmondson	Sherco	Enduro 2	Ret	18	22	17	14	15	Ret	Ret	23	17	14	18	5
27	(Spain) Enric Francisco	Sherco	Enduro 3	23	12	18	23	31	Ret							4
28	(Sweden) Mikael Persson	Sherco	Enduro 1							13	15					4
29	(Sweden) Filip Bengtsson	Husqvarna	Enduro 1					22	14	17	19					2
30	(Australia) Andrew Wilksch	Husqvarna	Enduro 3	Ret	30	14	24	18	18	31	DNS	19	22	Ret	23	2
31	(Brazil) Bruno Crivilin	Honda	Enduro 1	21	17	25	26	23	29	15	28	26	25	24	27	1
32	(France) Antoine Basset	Husqvarna	Enduro 3	18	19	15	35	20	24	26	20	22	19	19	19	1
Pos	Rider	Bike	Class	POR (Portugal)		ITA (Italy)		EST (Estonia)		SWE (Sweden)		POR (Portugal)		FRA (France)		Points

=== Enduro 1 ===
Team	Constructor	No	Rider	Rounds
Honda RedMoto Lunigiana Team	Honda	6	(Italy) Samuele Bernardini	All
Husqvarna JET Zanardo Team	Husqvarna	10	(Italy) Davide Soreca	All
S2 Motorsports Honda RedMoto	Honda	11	(Brazil) Bruno Crivilin	All
Honda Racing RedMoto World Enduro Team	Honda	17	(France) Theophile Espinasse	3–6
Honda Racing RedMoto World Enduro Team	Honda	108	(New Zealand) James Scott	3–4
Team Beta Oxmoto	Beta	23	(France) Christophe Charlier	1–3, 5–6
TM Boano Factory Team	TM	25	(Italy) Matteo Cavallo	1, 3–6
Team Honda Impala	Honda	38	(Spain) Kirian Mirabet	1–2
Fantic Factory Team E50	Fantic	39	(Italy) Davide Guarneri	All
KTM Team Pro Racing Sport	KTM	40	(Canada) Kade Tinkler	All
Dafy Enduro Team	Husqvarna	46	(France) Till De Clercq	1, 6
Team KTM GST Berlin	KTM	48	(Germany) Edward Hübner	6
Sherco Factory Racing	Sherco	71	(Belgium) Antoine Magain	All
Yamaha Deutschland by Neubert Racing Shop	Yamaha	82	(Switzerland) Jonathan Rosse	1–2
Bloms MX Husqvarna Scandinavia	Husqvarna	84	(Sweden) Filip Bengtsson	3–4
Johansson MPE	Yamaha	88	(Norway) Kevin Burud	1–5
Gas Gas Factory Racing	Gas Gas	99	(Italy) Andrea Verona	All
Oliveira Racing Team	Yamaha	103	(Portugal) Luis Oliveira	1–2, 5
MotorSpeed	KTM	130	(Norway) Mikkel Mikkelsen	4
KTM Racing Scandinavia	KTM	131	(Sweden) Mikael Persson	4
Team Lillemans MC	Yamaha	142	(Sweden) Franz Lofquist	4
Beta Portugal	Beta	152	(Portugal) Diogo Ventura	1
Kytönen Motorsport	Husqvarna	159	(Finland) Roni Salin	3
Sherco Sweden Team	Sherco	165	(Sweden) Anton Sandstedt	4
CEC Motorcycles KTM	KTM	179	(Sweden) Mattias Ojanperä	4
Sherco Academy France	Sherco	186	(France) Charlélie Courtine	6
	Sherco	189	(France) Quentin Crouzet	6

=== Riders Championship ===
Pos	Rider	Bike	POR (Portugal)		ITA (Italy)		EST (Estonia)		SWE (Sweden)		POR (Portugal)		FRA (France)		Points
1	(Italy) Andrea Verona	Gas Gas	1	2	1	1	1	1	3	1	1	1	1	1	232
2	(Italy) Davide Guarneri	Fantic	2	1	2	2	2	2	1	2	2	2	4	2	206
3	(Italy) Samuele Bernardini	Honda	6	3	4	5	4	3	2	3	5	5	8	7	148
4	(Belgium) Antoine Magain	Sherco	8	4	3	3	3	6	4	6	7	6	5	3	144
5	(Italy) Davide Soreca	Husqvarna	4	5	7	4	5	4	8	9	6	3	6	5	131
6	(Brazil) Bruno Crivilin	Honda	7	7	6	8	9	10	6	11	9	7	7	9	96
7	(Italy) Matteo Cavallo	TM	Ret	DNS			6	7	Ret	Ret	3	4	2	4	77
8	(Canada) Kade Tinkler	KTM	Ret	DNS	9	9	10	11	10	5	Ret	8	9	8	65
9	(France) Theophile Espinasse	Honda					7	8	9	8	8	Ret	3	Ret	55
10	(France) Christophe Charlier	Beta	3	6	Ret	DNS	Ret	DNS			4	Ret	11	6	53
11	(Sweden) Filip Bengtsson	Husqvarna					8	5	7	7					37
12	(Norway) Kevin Burud	Yamaha	13	Ret	10	10	13	13	14	12	10	Ret			33
13	(Spain) Kirian Mirabet	Honda	5	Ret	5	6									32
14	(Portugal) Luis Oliveira	Yamaha	11	10	8	7					Ret	Ret			28
15	(Sweden) Mikael Persson	KTM							5	4					24
16	(New Zealand) James Scott	Honda					11	9	11	10					23
17	(Portugal) Diogo Ventura	Beta	9	8											15
18	(France) Till De Clercq	Husqvarna	10	9									Ret	DNS	13
19	(Germany) Edward Hübner	KTM											10	10	12
20	(Switzerland) Jonathan Rosse	Yamaha	12	11	Ret	DNS									9
21	(Finland) Roni Salin	Husqvarna					12	12							8
22	(Sweden) Franz Lofquist	Yamaha							12	13					7
23	(France) Quentin Crouzet	Sherco											Ret	11	5
24	(Sweden) Anton Sandstedt	Sherco							13	Ret					3
25	(Norway) Mikkel Mikkelsen	KTM							15	Ret					1
	(Sweden) Mattias Ojanperä	KTM							16	DNS					0
	(France) Charlélie Courtine	Sherco											Ret	DNS	0
Pos	Rider	Bike	POR (Portugal)		ITA (Italy)		EST (Estonia)		SWE (Sweden)		POR (Portugal)		FRA (France)		Points

=== Enduro 2 ===
Team	Constructor	No	Rider	Rounds
Beta Factory Enduro Team	Beta	1	(United Kingdom) Steve Holcombe	All
Husqvarna JET Zanardo Team	Husqvarna	3	(United Kingdom) Joe Wootton	All
S2 Motorsports Honda RedMoto	Honda	9	(Italy) Alex Salvini	1–2
Sherco Factory Racing	Sherco	18	(United Kingdom) Jack Edmondson	All
Sherco Factory Racing	Sherco	76	(New Zealand) Hamish MacDonald	All
Honda Racing RedMoto World Enduro Team	Honda	22	(Italy) Thomas Oldrati	1, 3–6
Honda Racing RedMoto World Enduro Team	Honda	194	(United Kingdom) Nathan Watson	5–6
Red Bull KTM Factory Racing	KTM	26	(Spain) Josep García	All
Red Bull KTM Factory Racing	KTM	199	(Germany) Manuel Lettenbichler	2
Honda RedMoto Lunigiana Team	Honda	31	(United Kingdom) Alex Snow	All
TM Racing Finland	TM	34	(Finland) Eero Remes	All
Husqvarna Scandinavia	Husqvarna	41	(Sweden) Albin Elowson	1–4
Team KTM GST Berlin	KTM	48	(Germany) Edward Hübner	1
Elite Moto 15 Enduro Team	KTM	56	(France) Hugo Blanjoue	1–2, 6
TM Boano Factory Team	TM	57	(Australia) Wil Ruprecht	All
WP Eric Augé Team	KTM	61	(Argentina) Nicolas Kutulas	1–4
Lasermaster TM UK	TM	83	(United Kingdom) Josh Gotts	All
Atomic Moto	Husqvarna	91	(France) David Abgrall	1–2, 5–6
Atomic Moto	Husqvarna	185	(France) Alexis Beaud	6
SE Team	Honda	109	(Finland) Eemil Pohjola	3–4
MC Sport Racing Team	Husqvarna	112	(Sweden) Anton Lundgren	1–4
CEC Motorcycles Gas Gas	Gas Gas	139	(Sweden) Erik Wahlström	4
CEC Motorcycles Gas Gas	Gas Gas	176	(Sweden) Rikard Hansson	4
Sissi Racing	Gas Gas	148	(Italy) Mirko Spandre	2
Rockstar Energy Husqvarna Factory Racing	Husqvarna	157	(United Kingdom) Billy Bolt	2
Team To Enduro CBO Group	Beta	181	(France) Julien Raquidel	6
Team To Enduro CBO Group	Beta	190	(France) Max Vial	6

=== Riders Championship ===
Pos	Rider	Bike	POR (Portugal)		ITA (Italy)		EST (Estonia)		SWE (Sweden)		POR (Portugal)		FRA (France)		Points
1	(Spain) Josep García	KTM	2	3	2	3	1	1	2	1	1	1	1	1	221
2	(Australia) Wil Ruprecht	TM	3	1	1	1	2	2	1	2	4	Ret	3	5	185
3	(United Kingdom) Steve Holcombe	Beta	1	2	5	2	4	4	9	8	3	3	2	2	170
4	(New Zealand) Hamish MacDonald	Sherco	4	4	4	4	3	3	3	3	6	5	7	4	155
5	(United Kingdom) Joe Wootton	Husqvarna	7	8	17	7	8	7	8	5	7	8	4	6	102
6	(Finland) Eero Remes	TM	6	5	8	Ret	5	5	5	10	8	6	10	10	98
7	(Italy) Thomas Oldrati	Honda	5	Ret			7	8	6	7	5	4	5	7	91
8	(United Kingdom) Jack Edmondson	Sherco	Ret	6	10	8	6	6	Ret	Ret	9	7	8	8	76
9	(United Kingdom) Nathan Watson	Honda									2	2	6	3	59
10	(Sweden) Albin Elowson	Husqvarna	10	9	11	15	9	10	4	4					58
11	(Sweden) Anton Lundgren	Husqvarna	12	7	9	13	10	9	7	6					55
12	(France) David Abgrall	Husqvarna	9	10	16	10					11	9	9	9	45
13	(Argentina) Nicolas Kutulas	KTM	11	11	12	9	11	11	10	9					44
14	(United Kingdom) Alex Snow	Honda	Ret	12	14	12	12	13	13	11	10	10	11	Ret	42
15	(United Kingdom) Josh Gotts	TM	13	13	Ret	14	13	14	14	13	12	11	14	13	32
16	(France) Hugo Blanjoue	KTM	8	Ret	6	6							Ret	DNS	28
17	(United Kingdom) Billy Bolt	Husqvarna			3	5									26
18	(Finland) Eemil Pohjola	Honda					14	12	12	12					14
19	(Germany) Manuel Lettenbichler	KTM			7	Ret									9
20	(France) Julien Raquidel	Beta											13	11	8
21	(Italy) Mirko Spandre	Gas Gas			15	11									6
22	(Sweden) Rikard Hansson	Gas Gas							11	DNS					5
23	(France) Alexis Beaud	Husqvarna											Ret	12	4
24	(France) Max Vial	Beta											12	Ret	4
25	(Italy) Alex Salvini	Honda	Ret	DNS	13	Ret									3
26	(Sweden) Erik Wahlström	Gas Gas							15	14					3
	(Germany) Edward Hübner	KTM	Ret	DNS											0
Pos	Rider	Bike	POR (Portugal)		ITA (Italy)		EST (Estonia)		SWE (Sweden)		POR (Portugal)		FRA (France)		Points

=== Enduro 3 ===
Team	Constructor	No	Rider	Rounds
Atomic Moto	Husqvarna	7	(France) Antoine Basset	All
Beta Factory Enduro Team	Beta	12	(United Kingdom) Brad Freeman	All
Sherco Factory Racing	Sherco	21	(Spain) Enric Francisco	1–3
Sherco Factory Racing	Sherco	43	(United Kingdom) Danny McCanney	All
TM Boano Factory Team	TM	30	(San Marino) Thomas Marini	All
Husqvarna Motorcycles Spain	Husqvarna	42	(Spain) Marc Sans	All
Husqvarna JET Zanardo Team	Husqvarna	45	(Australia) Andrew Wilksch	All
Husqvarna JET Zanardo Team	Husqvarna	85	(United Kingdom) Jamie McCanney	All
WP Eric Augé Team	KTM	52	(Spain) Jaume Betriu	All
Aluns Motor Beta Scandinavia	Beta	74	(Sweden) Jimmy Wicksell	3–4
KTM Team Pro Racing Sport	KTM	90	(Italy) Rudy Moroni	5–6
Gas Gas Factory Racing	Gas Gas	111	(Poland) Tadeusz Blazusiak	2
	Gas Gas	181	(Italy) Giacomo Redondi	2
Team To Enduro CBO Group	Beta	191	(France) Vincent Gautie	6
Team To Enduro CBO Group	Beta	192	(France) Jean-Baptiste Brécheteau	6

=== Riders Championship ===
Pos	Rider	Bike	POR (Portugal)		ITA (Italy)		EST (Estonia)		SWE (Sweden)		POR (Portugal)		FRA (France)		Points
1	(United Kingdom) Brad Freeman	Beta	1	1	1	1	1	1	1	1	1	1	1	1	240
2	(Spain) Jaume Betriu	KTM	2	2	2	2	2	3	2	2	2	2	2	2	202
3	(United Kingdom) Danny McCanney	Sherco	3	3	4	3	3	2	4	4	3	4	3	3	174
4	(United Kingdom) Jamie McCanney	Husqvarna	4	5	3	4	4	4	3	3	4	5	4	4	158
5	(France) Antoine Basset	Beta	5	6	6	11	6	7	5	5	6	6	5	6	118
6	(Spain) Marc Sans	Husqvarna	7	7	11	10	7	6	7	6	7	3	7	5	111
7	(Australia) Andrew Wilksch	Husqvarna	Ret	8	5	9	5	5	8	DNS	5	7	Ret	7	85
8	(San Marino) Thomas Marini	TM	Ret	9	10	6	Ret	Ret	6	7	9	9	Ret	DNS	56
9	(Spain) Enric Francisco	Sherco	6	4	7	8	8	Ret							48
10	(Italy) Rudy Moroni	KTM									8	8	8	9	31
11	(Italy) Giacomo Redondi	Gas Gas			9	5									18
12	(France) Vincent Gautie	Beta											6	8	18
13	(Poland) Tadeusz Blazusiak	Gas Gas			8	7									17
14	(Sweden) Jimmy Wicksell	Beta					Ret	DNS	9	8					15
15	(France) Jean-Baptiste Brécheteau	Beta											9	10	13
Pos	Rider	Bike	POR (Portugal)		ITA (Italy)		EST (Estonia)		SWE (Sweden)		POR (Portugal)		FRA (France)		Points

== Junior ==
=== Riders Championship ===
Pos	Rider	Bike	Class	POR (Portugal)		ITA (Italy)		EST (Estonia)		SWE (Sweden)		POR (Portugal)		FRA (France)		Points
1	(Italy) Matteo Pavoni	TM	Junior 2	2	1	1	1	1	2	2	2	2	1	3	2	217
2	(Italy) Lorenzo Macoritto	TM	Junior 1	1	4	3	2	2	1	1	1	5	2	4	1	203
3	(France) Leo Le Quere	Sherco	Junior 2	9	3	2	3	3	4	14	3	3	4	6	6	147
4	(Sweden) Max Ahlin	Husqvarna	Junior 2	7	12	6	5	5	5	3	4	6	5	5	5	127
5	(United Kingdom) Jed Etchells	Fantic	Junior 1	12	10	14	12	6	6	4	8	7	7	1	3	110
6	(Spain) Sergio Navarro	Gas Gas	Junior 1	4	5	9	6	4	3	Ret	DNS	4	6	7	7	110
7	(Finland) Roni Kytönen	Honda	Junior 1	3	2	4	4	10	DNS			1	3	12	15	104
8	(France) Luc Fargier	Gas Gas	Junior 2	11	14	18	10	8	8	8	5	10	12	9	8	73
9	(Sweden) Lucas Vagberg	Yamaha	Junior 1	19	25	13	14	7	16	6	6	8	10	13	11	56
10	(Italy) Claudio Spanu	Husqvarna	Junior 1	8	8	7	7	12	13	10	16	14	11	18	20	54
11	(France) Antoine Criq	Beta	Junior 2	6	6	5	20	25	19	12	19	12	13	8	13	53
12	(Germany) Luca Fischeder	Sherco	Junior 2	17	7	10	11	15	Ret	13	10	9	9	14	9	53
13	(Spain) Bernat Cortes	Gas Gas	Junior 2	5	16	11	DNS					13	14	2	4	51
14	(Czech Republic) Kryštof Kouble	Sherco	Junior 2	29	11	16	9	11	7	9	12					37
15	(Italy) Enrico Zilli	Honda	Junior 2	15	19	12	13	22	Ret	19	9	11	8	17	12	32
16	(Chile) Ruy Barbosa	Honda	Junior 1					9	12	5	7					31
17	(Italy) Enrico Rinaldi	Gas Gas	Junior 2	16	26	8	8	30	9	16	14			22	Ret	25
18	(Italy) Manolo Morettini	KTM	Junior 1	13	17	15	21	19	15	7	13	15	16	15	17	19
19	(Belgium) Erik Willems	Husqvarna	Junior 2	Ret	21	17	25	14	14	17	17			11	10	15
20	(Spain) Pau Tomás	Beta	Junior 1	10	9	19	Ret	Ret	DNS			17	17	21	22	13
21	(Sweden) Oskar Ljungström	Husqvarna	Junior 2	18	Ret	20	17			11	11					10
22	(Finland) Peetu Juupaluoma	Husqvarna	Junior 1					13	10							9
23	(France) Antoine Alix	Husqvarna	Junior 1	Ret	DNS									10	14	8
24	(Finland) Hermanni Haljala	TM	Junior 1	22	13	21	15	16	17	15	15	24	15	19	16	7
25	(Sweden) Marcus Adielsson	Beta	Junior 2	20	20	27	19	17	11							5
26	(Spain) Adria Sanchez	KTM	Junior 1	14	15	24	22	20	Ret	20	18	16	18	23	18	3
Pos	Rider	Bike	Class	POR (Portugal)		ITA (Italy)		EST (Estonia)		SWE (Sweden)		POR (Portugal)		FRA (France)		Points

=== Junior 1 ===
Team	Constructor	No	Rider	Rounds
Honda Racing RedMoto World Enduro Team	Honda	19	(Finland) Roni Kytönen	1–3, 5–6
RFME Enduro Junior Team	Beta	24	(Spain) Julio Pando	1–4
RFME Enduro Junior Team	KTM	92	(Spain) Adria Sanchez	All
Funbike Fantic Finland	Fantic	28	(Finland) Hugo Svärd	3
Beta Portugal Motor Espinha	Beta	35	(Portugal) Gonçalo Sobrosa	1–2, 5
Osellini Moto	Husqvarna	36	(Italy) Claudio Spanu	All
LM Racing	Husqvarna	44	(France) Killian Lunier	1, 6
Fantic D'Arpa Racing Team	Fantic	47	(United Kingdom) Jed Etchells	All
Entrophy Enduro Beta Junior Team	Beta	50	(Italy) Jacopo Traini	1–3, 5–6
Entrophy Enduro Beta Junior Team	Beta	106	(Spain) Pau Tomás	1–3, 5–6
KTM Team Pro Racing Sport	KTM	51	(Italy) Manolo Morettini	All
TM Boano Factory Team	TM	58	(Finland) Hermanni Haljala	All
TM Boano Factory Team	TM	95	(Italy) Lorenzo Macoritto	All
WP Eric Augé Team	KTM	60	(Spain) Adria Mesas	1, 6
WP Eric Augé Team	KTM	63	(Argentina) Cristobal Sola	1–2, 5–6
WP Eric Augé Team	KTM	67	(Spain) Marti Escofet	1
Johansson MPE	Yamaha	72	(Sweden) Lucas Vågberg	All
S2 Motorsports Honda RedMoto	Honda	77	(United Kingdom) Dan Mundell	1–2, 5
S2 Motorsports Honda RedMoto	Honda	114	(Chile) Ruy Barbosa	3–4
Dafy Enduro Team	Husqvarna	80	(France) Antoine Alix	1, 6
Aub Moto Beta France	Beta	81	(France) Thomas Zoldos	1
Ekseloch Motor Beta Scandinavia	Beta	96	(Sweden) Lucas Bergstrom	1–4
Sherco Academy Germany	Sherco	116	(Germany) Karl Weigelt	4
Bloms MX KTM Scandinavia	KTM	119	(Sweden) Edvin Hamnäs	3–4
WPM Motors	KTM	124	(Netherlands) Tommie Jochems	3–4
Gas Gas Spain Motos Aleser	Gas Gas	127	(Spain) Sergio Navarro	All
	KTM	145	(Italy) Francesco Servalli	2
GTG Motogamma	Gas Gas	146	(Italy) Simone Cristini	2
GTG Motogamma	Gas Gas	149	(Italy) Thomas Grigis	2
	KTM	147	(Sweden) Ludvig Petterson	4
	KTM	158	(Sweden) Kalle Hindström	4
Stombergs Racing	KTM	162	(Sweden) Carl Andersson	4
Kytönen Motorsport	Husqvarna	166	(Finland) Peetu Juupaluoma	3
	Yamaha	167	(Sweden) Isak Österberg	4
Team Hoj Butiken Racing	KTM	170	(Sweden) Adam Fasth	4
CEC Racing	Husqvarna	171	(Sweden) Marcus Eisner	4
Sherco Academy France	Sherco	179	(France) Adrien Marchini	6
Sherco Factory Racing	Sherco	199	(France) Zachary Pichon	6

=== Riders Championship ===
Pos	Rider	Bike	POR (Portugal)		ITA (Italy)		EST (Estonia)		SWE (Sweden)		POR (Portugal)		FRA (France)		Points
1	(Italy) Lorenzo Macoritto	TM	1	2	1	1	1	1	1	1	3	1	2	1	229
2	(United Kingdom) Jed Etchells	Fantic	6	6	6	5	3	3	2	4	4	4	1	2	164
3	(Spain) Sergio Navarro	Gas Gas	3	3	4	3	2	2	Ret	DNS	2	3	3	3	154
4	(Finland) Roni Kytönen	Honda	2	1	2	2	6	DNS			1	2	5	6	139
5	(Sweden) Lucas Vagberg	Yamaha	9	12	5	6	4	8	4	2	5	5	6	4	128
6	(Italy) Claudio Spanu	Husqvarna	4	4	3	4	7	6	6	7	6	6	9	11	124
7	(Italy) Manolo Morettini	KTM	7	9	7	9	10	7	5	5	7	8	7	8	103
8	(Finland) Hermanni Haljala	TM	10	7	9	7	9	9	7	6	13	7	10	7	91
9	(Spain) Adria Sanchez	KTM	8	8	11	10	11	Ret	8	8	8	10	13	9	72
10	(Chile) Ruy Barbosa	Honda					5	5	3	3					52
11	(Spain) Pau Tomás	Beta	5	5	8	Ret	Ret	DNS			9	9	12	12	52
12	(Italy) Jacopo Traini	Beta	11	10	10	8	17	Ret			12	Ret	14	13	34
13	(Sweden) Lucas Bergstrom	Beta	14	14	19	13	12	10	10	9					30
14	(Spain) Julio Pando	Beta	12	11	13	Ret	15	14	9	13					25
15	(France) Antoine Alix	Husqvarna	Ret	DNS									4	5	24
16	(Finland) Peetu Juupaluoma	Husqvarna					8	4							21
17	(Argentina) Cristobal Sola	KTM	13	13	17	14					11	11	15	14	21
18	(Sweden) Edvin Hamnäs	KTM					13	11	11	11					18
19	(France) Killian Lunier	Husqvarna	Ret	Ret									11	10	11
20	(United Kingdom) Dan Mundell	Honda	Ret	Ret	12	DNS					10	DNS			10
21	(Sweden) Adam Fasth	KTM							12	10					10
22	(Netherlands) Tommie Jochems	KTM					16	13	14	12					9
23	(France) Zachary Pichon	Sherco											8	Ret	8
24	(Italy) Simone Cristini	Gas Gas			14	11									7
25	(Finland) Hugo Svärd	Fantic					14	12							6
26	(Italy) Thomas Grigis	Gas Gas			15	12									5
27	(Sweden) Marcus Eisner	Husqvarna							13	Ret					3
28	(Sweden) Isak Österberg	Yamaha							16	14					2
29	(Sweden) Carl Andersson	KTM							Ret	15					1
30	(Sweden) Kalle Hindström	KTM							15	16					1
31	(Italy) Francesco Servalli	KTM			18	15									1
	(Portugal) Gonçalo Sobrosa	Beta	Ret	DNS	16	16					Ret	DNS			0
	(France) Adrien Marchini	Sherco											16	Ret	0
	(Germany) Karl Weigelt	Sherco							17	17					0
	(Sweden) Ludvig Pettersson	KTM							18	18					0
	(Spain) Adria Mesas	KTM	Ret	DNS									Ret	DNS	0
	(France) Thomas Zoldos	Beta	Ret	Ret											0
	(Spain) Marti Escofet	KTM	Ret	DNS											0
Pos	Rider	Bike	POR (Portugal)		ITA (Italy)		EST (Estonia)		SWE (Sweden)		POR (Portugal)		FRA (France)		Points

=== Junior 2 ===
Team	Constructor	No	Rider	Rounds
Husqvarna Scandinavia	Husqvarna	2	(Sweden) Max Ahlin	All
Husqvarna Scandinavia	Husqvarna	55	(Sweden) Oskar Ljungström	1–2, 4
Atomic Moto	Beta	5	(France) Killian Irigoyen	5–6
Sherco Academy France	Sherco	8	(France) Leo Le Quere	All
Adielsson Racing Beta Scandinavia	Beta	15	(Sweden) Marcus Adielsson	1–3
True Adventure Off Road Academy	Honda	16	(Italy) Enrico Zilli	All
RFME Enduro Junior Team	Sherco	20	(Spain) David Riera	All
RFME Enduro Junior Team	Beta	24	(Spain) Julio Pando	5–6
RFME Enduro Junior Team	Gas Gas	86	(Spain) Bernat Cortes	1–2, 5–6
ACCR Czech Talent Team	Sherco	29	(Czech Republic) Kryštof Kouble	1–4
Team Laugio Racing	Gas Gas	49	(France) Luc Fargier	All
Sherco Academy Deutschland	Sherco	62	(Germany) Luca Fischeder	All
Team Beta Oxmoto	Beta	69	(France) Antoine Criq	All
MRS/ET James Sherco UK	Sherco	70	(United Kingdom) Alex Walton	1–2
Ride and Race Husqvarna	Husqvarna	89	(Belgium) Erik Willems	1–4, 6
JWR MX Store	Honda	93	(Sweden) Max Erlandsson	3–4
TM Boano Factory Team	TM	98	(Italy) Matteo Pavoni	All
Team Largen Racing Motostar	Husqvarna	101	(Sweden) Noa Largen	1–2
Team 501	KTM	105	(Poland) Dominik Olszowy	2
TM Racing Finland	TM	129	(Finland) Eetu Puhakainen	3–4, 6
Osellini Team	Gas Gas	144	(Italy) Enrico Rinaldi	1–4, 6
GTG Motogamma	Gas Gas	147	(Italy) Maurizio Martinelli	2
Motostar Husqvarna	Husqvarna	156	(Sweden) Lukas Largen	4
Team Lingvalls Motor	KTM	168	(Sweden) Anton Rosendal	3–4
Beta Portugal	Beta	170	(Portugal) Renato Silva	5
	Sherco	174	(Sweden) Dennis Henberg	4
Cross Centeret Snellingen	Husqvarna	180	(Norway) Marcus Christensen	4
Team CEV 555	KTM	183	(France) Loup Becker	6
JE68 Enduro Team	KTM	198	(Sweden) David Kadestam	3

=== Riders Championship ===
Pos	Rider	Bike	POR (Portugal)		ITA (Italy)		EST (Estonia)		SWE (Sweden)		POR (Portugal)		FRA (France)		Points
1	(Italy) Matteo Pavoni	TM	1	1	1	1	1	1	1	1	1	1	2	1	237
2	(France) Leo Le Quere	Sherco	5	2	2	2	2	2	8	2	2	2	4	4	181
3	(Sweden) Max Ahlin	Husqvarna	4	6	4	3	3	3	2	3	3	3	3	3	173
4	(France) Luc Fargier	Gas Gas	6	7	11	6	4	5	3	4	5	6	6	5	128
5	(France) Antoine Criq	Beta	3	3	3	12	12	10	6	11	7	7	5	9	110
6	(Germany) Luca Fischeder	Sherco	9	4	6	7	7	Ret	7	6	4	5	8	6	109
7	(Italy) Enrico Zilli	Honda	7	10	8	8	10	Ret	12	5	6	4	9	8	90
8	(Spain) Bernat Cortes	Gas Gas	2	8	7	DNS					8	8	1	2	87
9	(Czech Republic) Kryštof Kouble	Sherco	15	5	9	5	5	4	4	8					75
10	(Italy) Enrico Rinaldi	Gas Gas	8	14	5	4	15	6	9	9			10	Ret	65
11	(Belgium) Erik Willems	Husqvarna	Ret	12	10	14	6	8	10	10			7	7	60
12	(Spain) David Riera	Sherco	13	Ret	16	Ret	13	11	13	12	9	9	11	Ret	37
13	(Sweden) Oskar Ljungstrom	Husqvarna	10	Ret	12	10			5	7					36
14	(Sweden) Marcus Adielsson	Beta	11	11	15	11	8	7							33
15	(Spain) Julio Pando	Beta									11	11	12	10	20
16	(Sweden) Max Erlandsson	Honda					9	9	11	Ret					19
17	(Sweden) Noa Largen	Husqvarna	14	9	13	9									19
18	(Finland) Eetu Puhakainen	TM					11	Ret	14	13			13	11	18
19	(France) Killian Irigoyen	Beta									10	10	Ret	DNS	12
20	(United Kingdom) Alex Walton	Sherco	12	13	14	13									12
21	(Sweden) Anton Rosendal	KTM					14	12	17	16					6
22	(Norway) Marcus Christensen	Husqvarna							15	14					3
23	(France) Loup Becker	KTM											14	Ret	2
24	(Sweden) Lukas Largen	Husqvarna							16	15					1
25	(Italy) Maurizio Martinelli	Gas Gas			17	15									1
	(Sweden) Dennis Henberg	Sherco							18	17					0
	(Poland) Dominik Olszowy	KTM			Ret	Ret									0
	(Sweden) David Kadestam	KTM					Ret	DNS							0
	(Portugal) Renato Silva	Beta									Ret	DNS			0
Pos	Rider	Bike	POR (Portugal)		ITA (Italy)		EST (Estonia)		SWE (Sweden)		POR (Portugal)		FRA (France)		Points

== Youth ==
Team	Constructor	No	Rider	Rounds
	KTM	13	(United Kingdom) Sam Davies	1, 4–6
Yamaha Offroad Experience	Yamaha	27	(United Kingdom) Charlie Chater	1–2, 6
Fantic Factory Team E50	Fantic	33	(Italy) Daniele Delbono	All
Fantic Factory Team E50	Fantic	67	(Spain) Marti Escofet	5–6
Fantic D'Arpa Racing Team	Fantic	37	(Italy) Kevin Cristino	All
Fantic D'Arpa Racing Team	Fantic	97	(Sweden) Albin Norrbin	All
TM Racing Finland	TM	53	(Finland) Samuli Puhakainen	All
Oliveira Racing Team	Yamaha	54	(Portugal) Rodrigo Luz	1–2, 5
WP Eric Augé Team	KTM	59	(Spain) Lluis Gonfaus	1, 6
WP Eric Augé Team	KTM	78	(Spain) Albert Fontova	1–4
WP Eric Augé Team	KTM	187	(Spain) Alex Puey	6
Johansson MPE	Yamaha	65	(Sweden) Arvid Modin	All
Fast Eddy Racing	Fantic	66	(United Kingdom) Alfie Webb	1–2
Fantic JET Racing	Fantic	68	(United Kingdom) Harry Edmondson	All
Fantic JET Racing	Fantic	94	(Italy) Riccardo Fabris	All
TM Racing Portugal	TM	73	(Portugal) Frederico Rocha	1–2, 5
Entrophy Enduro Beta Junior Team	Beta	75	(Italy) Lorenzo Giuliani	1–4
TM Boano Factory Team	TM	87	(Norway) Herman Ask	All
KTM Nimes by Race Moto	KTM	104	(France) Evan Raffard	5–6
Atomic Moto	Beta	122	(France) Leo Joyon	2, 6
Hot 1 Racing	Yamaha	128	(Finland) Tiitus Enjala	3
Kytönen Motorsport	Husqvarna	143	(Finland) Niko Puotsaari	3
Kytönen Motorsport	Husqvarna	160	(Finland) Pyry Juupaluoma	3
	Husqvarna	150	(France) Mathias Dolci	2, 6
GM Enduro Racing Team	Husqvarna	151	(Italy) Paolo Degiacomi	2
	Beta	154	(Italy) Gabriele Pasinetti	2
Beta Racing Finland	Beta	161	(Finland) Roni Heikkala	3
Beta Scandinavia	Beta	163	(Sweden) Gustav Rådmark	4
JE68 Enduro Team	KTM	164	(Sweden) Emil Carell	4
Bloms MX	Husqvarna	169	(Sweden) Kalle Ahlin	3–4
	KTM	172	(Sweden) Alfred Sundgren	4
	Husqvarna	173	(Sweden) Nisse Bengtsson	4
Team Bonneton 2 Roues Fantic	Fantic	176	(France) Maxime Clauzier	6
CEC Racing	Husqvarna	177	(Sweden) Linus Lamberg	4
Keva Motor AB	Gas Gas	178	(Sweden) André Blohmé	4
Sherco Academy France	Sherco	178	(France) Thibault Giraudon	6
Team Liberty Motorcycles Fantic	Fantic	184	(France) Nathan Corny	6
TNT Corse KTM	KTM	197	(Italy) Nicolo Paolucci	2

=== Riders Championship ===
Pos	Rider	Bike	POR (Portugal)		ITA (Italy)		EST (Estonia)		SWE (Sweden)		POR (Portugal)		FRA (France)		Points
1	(Sweden) Albin Norrbin	Fantic	2	1	2	1	1	1	1	1	1	1	1	1	234
2	(United Kingdom) Harry Edmondson	Fantic	1	2	1	2	5	7	3	4	4	4	3	2	180
3	(Italy) Kevin Cristino	Fantic	3	3	3	3	3	4	2	3	2	2	5	3	180
4	(Finland) Samuli Puhakainen	TM	4	6	6	Ret	4	3	4	2	3	3	Ret	7	130
5	(Italy) Riccardo Fabris	Fantic	6	5	4	8	8	8	Ret	DNS	11	7	6	6	92
6	(Italy) Daniele Delbono	Fantic	7	9	10	7	9	11	6	6	9	6	9	11	92
7	(Spain) Albert Fontova	KTM	5	4	9	6	6	5	5	5					84
8	(Sweden) Arvid Modin	Yamaha	9	7	11	14	10	9	7	14	6	5	11	13	76
9	(France) Leo Joyon	Beta			5	4							4	4	50
10	(Italy) Lorenzo Giuliani	Beta	8	13	8	10	12	13	8	8					48
11	(United Kingdom) Sam Davies	KTM	11	Ret					11	9	8	9	8	10	46
12	(Finland) Pyry Juupaluoma	Husqvarna					2	2							34
13	(United Kingdom) Charlie Chater	Yamaha	10	8	13	12							7	14	32
14	(France) Thibault Giraudon	Sherco											2	5	28
15	(Norway) Herman Ask	TM	12	12	12	15	13	Ret	Ret	Ret	Ret	8	17	16	24
16	(Italy) Gabriele Pasinetti	Beta			7	5									20
17	(Portugal) Rodrigo Luz	Yamaha	13	11	16	13					7	Ret			20
18	(France) Mathias Dolci	Husqvarna			14	11							10	9	20
19	(Finland) Tiitus Enjala	Yamaha					7	6							19
20	(France) Evan Raffard	KTM									10	11	12	12	19
21	(Sweden) Kalle Ahlin	Husqvarna					14	12	9	11					18
22	(Sweden) Nisse Bengtsson	Husqvarna							10	7					15
23	(Portugal) Frederico Rocha	TM	Ret	15	18	Ret					5	Ret			12
24	(France) Maxime Clauzier	Fantic											13	8	11
25	(Finland) Niko Puotsaari	Husqvarna					11	10							11
26	(Spain) Marti Escofet	Fantic									12	10	Ret	DNS	10
27	(Sweden) Emil Carell	KTM							12	10					10
28	(Italy) Nicolo Paolucci	KTM			15	9									8
29	(Spain) Lluis Gonfaus	KTM	Ret	10									15	15	8
30	(Sweden) Gustav Rådmark	Beta							13	12					7
31	(Sweden) André Blohmé	Gas Gas							14	13					5
32	(Spain) Alex Puey	KTM											14	Ret	2
33	(Finland) Roni Heikkala	Beta					Ret	14							2
34	(United Kingdom) Alfie Webb	Fantic	Ret	14	17	16									2
35	(Sweden) Linus Lamberg	Husqvarna							15	15					2
	(Sweden) Alfred Sundgren	KTM							16	16					0
	(France) Nathan Corny	Fantic											16	17	0
	(Italy) Paolo Degiacomi	Husqvarna			19	17									0
Pos	Rider	Bike	POR (Portugal)		ITA (Italy)		EST (Estonia)		SWE (Sweden)		POR (Portugal)		FRA (France)		Points

== Women ==
Team	Constructor	No	Rider	Rounds
	Husqvarna	402	(Sweden) Linnéa Åkesson	2
Off Road Tryout	Honda	404	(United Kingdom) Nieve Holmes	1
Bloms MX	Husqvarna	405	(Sweden) Emma Wennbom	2
KTM Scandinavia	KTM	410	(Sweden) Hedvig Malm	1
	Husqvarna	411	(France) Audrey Rossat	1
CEC Racing	KTM	414	(Sweden) Emelie Borg Nilsson	All
Redline Motorcycles	KTM	416	(United Kingdom) Rosie Rowett	All
Cap Motos 25 Gas Gas	Gas Gas	417	(France) Mauricette Brisebard	All
Tandberg MC Gas Gas Scandinavia	Gas Gas	422	(Norway) Vilde Holt	All
RFME Enduro Women's Team	Sherco	426	(Spain) Kate Vall	All
RFME Enduro Women's Team	Gas Gas	432	(Spain) Mireia Badia	All
Beta Trueba	Beta	434	(Spain) Julia Calvo	1–2
Techno Bike	KTM	440	(France) Marine Lemoine	3
WP Eric Augé Team	Gas Gas	444	(Spain) Laia Sanz	All
Raposeira Yamaha Portugal	Yamaha	461	(Portugal) Rita Vieira	All
Momento TT Gas Gas Portugal	Gas Gas	467	(Portugal) Bruna Antunes	All
Jetmar Husqvarna Portugal	Husqvarna	474	(Portugal) Joana Gonçalves	All
Elite Moto 15 Enduro Team	KTM	495	(France) Justine Martel	1, 3
Fantic Motor	Fantic	496	(United Kingdom) Jane Daniels	All

=== Riders Championship ===
Pos	Rider	Bike	POR (Portugal)		SWE (Sweden)		FRA (France)		Points
1	(Spain) Laia Sanz	Gas Gas	1	3	1	1	1	1	115
2	(Spain) Mireia Badia	Gas Gas	3	1	3	2	3	2	99
3	(United Kingdom) Jane Daniels	Fantic	2	2	2	3	2	3	98
4	(United Kingdom) Rosie Rowett	KTM	8	5	4	4	5	5	67
5	(Portugal) Joana Gonçalves	Husqvarna	6	6	7	6	6	7	58
6	(France) Justine Martel	KTM	4	4			4	4	52
7	(Norway) Vilde Holt	Gas Gas	Ret	7	5	5	7	6	50
8	(Portugal) Rita Vieira	Yamaha	7	8	8	9	8	9	47
9	(Portugal) Bruna Antunes	Gas Gas	9	10	9	7	10	11	40
10	(Sweden) Emelie Borg Nilsson	KTM	10	11	11	10	13	12	29
11	(France) Mauricette Brisebard	Gas Gas	11	12	12	11	11	10	29
12	(United Kingdom) Nieve Holmes	Honda	5	9					18
13	(Sweden) Linnéa Åkesson	Husqvarna			6	8			18
14	(Spain) Kate Vall	Sherco	12	14	14	13	12	13	18
15	(France) Marine Lemoine	KTM					9	8	15
16	(Spain) Julia Calvo	Beta	Ret	DNS	13	12			7
17	(Sweden) Emma Wennbom	Husqvarna			10	Ret			6
18	(France) Audrey Rossat	Husqvarna	Ret	13					3
	(Sweden) Hedvig Malm	KTM	Ret	DNS					0
Pos	Rider	Bike	POR (Portugal)		SWE (Sweden)		FRA (France)		Points

== Open World Cup ==
=== Open 2-Stroke ===
Team	Constructor	No	Rider	Rounds
	Yamaha	501	(Austria) Giovanni Thun Hohenstein	2
	Husqvarna	502	(Italy) Lorenzo Balzarini	2
Enduro Echtgold Team Prichovice	Gas Gas	503	(Czech Republic) Robert Friedrich	2–6
GTG Motogamma	Gas Gas	504	(Italy) Patrick Grigis	2
	Beta	505	(Germany) Stefan Staudacher	2
Bombe Racing	Beta	506	(Germany) Samantha Buhmann	2
	Sherco	508	(Italy) Alberto Gazzoli	2
Beta Belgium Mots Racing	Beta	509	(Belgium) Maxime Warenghien	2, 4–6
Fast Team	Husqvarna	510	(Italy) Andrea Fleischmann	2
	Husqvarna	512	(Italy) Davide Compagnoni	2
	Honda	514	(Italy) Pierre Giuseppe Pegurri	2
37 Racing ASD	Husqvarna	515	(Italy) Massimo Wolkow Mutti	2
Team Cello 555	Sherco	516	(Italy) Sebastiano Buzzi	2
Cais Motor Gas Gas Portugal	Gas Gas	517	(Portugal) Gonçalo Reis	1–4, 6
	KTM	518	(Estonia) Riho Keerme	3
	KTM	519	(Estonia) Elary Talu	3
	Beta	520	(Portugal) Bernardo Silva	1–2
	Gas Gas	521	(Estonia) Kalev Kriis	3
	Gas Gas	531	(Sweden) Rasmus Andersson	4
Delta Racing	Beta	532	(Sweden) Sebastian Adielsson	4
Team Motokrosovaskola	Husqvarna	533	(Czech Republic) Zdenek Pitel	3–6
Motofit Beta UK	Beta	534	(United Kingdom) Harry Houghton	5–6
	Sherco	542	(Belgium) Nicolas Bronsart	2
Enduro Team Hungary	Sherco	555	(Hungary) Mark Szőke	2, 5–6
Andre Motors KTM Netherlands	KTM	556	(Netherlands) Kaiya Brouwer	All
Entrophy Enduro Racing	Beta	563	(Italy) Andrea Conigliaro	1–2
	KTM	572	(Czech Republic) Oldrich Sedlak	3–6
Bomcar Husqvarna Portugal	Husqvarna	573	(Portugal) Vitor Queiros	1–2, 5
Team A-Moto	KTM	577	(Sweden) Måns Dalén	4
Jetmar KTM Portugal	KTM	581	(Portugal) Abel Carreiro	5

=== Riders Championship ===
Pos	Rider	Bike	POR (Portugal)		ITA (Italy)		EST (Estonia)		SWE (Sweden)		POR (Portugal)		FRA (France)		Points
1	(Portugal) Gonçalo Reis	Gas Gas	1	1	2	2	1	1	2	2			3	4	148
2	(Belgium) Maxime Warenghien	Beta			1	1			1	1	1	1	Ret	DNS	120
3	(Netherlands) Kaiya Brouwer	KTM	2	2	6	6	4	4	4	3	3	3	5	6	118
4	(Czech Republic) Robert Friedrich	Gas Gas			5	5	3	3	3	5	4	6	2	3	112
5	(Czech Republic) Zdenek Pitel	Husqvarna					5	5	5	4	6	5	4	1	100
6	(Hungary) Mark Szőke	Sherco			4	4					2	2	6	5	81
7	(Czech Republic) Oldrich Sedlak	KTM					7	8	9	9	8	8	7	7	65
8	(United Kingdom) Harry Houghton	Beta									5	4	1	2	61
9	(Portugal) Vitor Queiros	Husqvarna	3	4	10	10					Ret	Ret			40
10	(Italy) Andrea Conigliaro	Beta	4	5	9	9									38
11	(Estonia) Elary Talu	KTM					2	2							34
12	(Italy) Patrick Grigis	Gas Gas			3	3									30
13	(Portugal) Bernardo Silva	Beta	5	3	Ret	DNS									26
14	(Sweden) Sebastian Adielsson	Beta							6	6					20
15	(Estonia) Riho Keerme	KTM					6	6							20
16	(Portugal) Abel Carreiro	KTM									7	7			18
17	(Sweden) Rasmus Andersson	Beta							7	7					18
18	(Italy) Massimo Wolkow Mutti	Husqvarna			7	7									18
19	(Estonia) Kalev Kriis	Gas Gas					8	7							17
20	(Sweden) Måns Dalén	KTM							8	8					16
21	(Italy) Lorenzo Balzarini	Husqvarna			8	8									16
22	(Austria) Giovanni Thun Hohenstein	Yamaha			12	11									9
23	(Italy) Andrea Fleischmann	Husqvarna			11	12									9
24	(Italy) Pierre Giuseppe Pegurri	Honda			13	13									6
25	(Italy) Alberto Gazzoli	Sherco			15	14									3
26	(Italy) Davide Compagnoni	Husqvarna			14	15									3
	(Italy) Sebastiano Buzzi	Sherco			16	16									0
	(Germany) Samantha Buhmann	Beta			17	Ret									0
	(Belgium) Nicolas Bronsart	Sherco			Ret	Ret									0
	(Germany) Stefan Staudacher	Beta			Ret	DNS									0
Pos	Rider	Bike	POR (Portugal)		ITA (Italy)		EST (Estonia)		SWE (Sweden)		POR (Portugal)		FRA (France)		Points

=== Open 4-Stroke ===
Team	Constructor	No	Rider	Rounds
	Gas Gas	602	(Italy) Nicola Lanza	2
	Husqvarna	603	(Italy) Francesco Baldoni	2
	Beta	604	(Germany) Maxi Schek	2
	Gas Gas	605	(Italy) Diego Ballardini	2
Honda RedMoto	Honda	606	(Italy) Elia Campagnolo	2
Honda RedMoto	Honda	610	(Italy) Tiziano Interno	1
	KTM	607	(Switzerland) Hansrüdi Klichenmann	2
	KTM	608	(Italy) Sebastiano Marenzi	2
	Honda	609	(Italy) Nicola Lazzaroni	2
Karksi Racing Team	Husqvarna	611	(Estonia) Ragnar Valdstein	3
Sherco Vukcevic Racing	Sherco	612	(Belgium) Gordano Natale	1–2
Sherco Vukcevic Racing	Sherco	613	(Belgium) Jeremy Herinne	1–2, 4–6
Hospital Motos Beta	Beta	615	(France) Corentin Poutignat	6
Factory Image Racing	KTM	617	(United Kingdom) Fraser Flockhart	1–2
RC Motorsport	Husqvarna	618	(France) Rudy Cotton	6
	Husqvarna	622	(Estonia) Priit Raid	3
	Husqvarna	623	(Chile) Carlos Gonzales	3–4
	KTM	630	(Switzerland) Daniel Brunner	2
Enduro Team Hungary	KTM	639	(Hungary) Norbert Zsigovits	2–6
Johansson MPE	Yamaha	643	(Sweden) Nisse Gustavsson	3–6
Johansson MPE	Yamaha	653	(Estonia) Priit Biene	All
24MX Enduro Team	Gas Gas	651	(Sweden) Robin Wiss	4
	KTM	655	(Hungary) Istvan Jager	4
	KTM	696	(Italy) Federico Minelli	2

=== Riders Championship ===
Pos	Rider	Bike	POR (Portugal)		ITA (Italy)		EST (Estonia)		SWE (Sweden)		POR (Portugal)		FRA (France)		Points
1	(Estonia) Priit Biene	Yamaha	2	2	1	1	1	1	2	1	1	1	4	4	157
2	(Hungary) Norbert Zsigovits	KTM			3	3	2	2	1	5	3	3	2	1	136
3	(Belgium) Jeremy Herinne	Sherco	3	3	4	4			3	2	2	2	3	2	128
4	(Sweden) Nisse Gustavsson	Yamaha					3	3	5	4	4	4	6	6	100
5	(United Kingdom) Fraser Flockhart	KTM	1	1	2	2									74
6	(Belgium) Gordano Natale	Sherco	4	4	5	5									48
7	(Chile) Carlos Gonzales	Husqvarna					6	6	7	6					39
8	(France) Corentin Poutignat	Beta											1	3	35
9	(Sweden) Robin Wiss	Gas Gas							4	3					28
10	(Estonia) Priit Raid	Husqvarna					5	4							24
11	(Estonia) Ragnar Valdstein	Husqvarna					4	5							24
12	(France) Rudy Cotton	Husqvarna											5	5	22
13	(Italy) Tiziano Interno	Honda	5	5											22
14	(Germany) Maxi Schek	Beta			6	7									19
15	(Italy) Nicola Lazzaroni	Honda			9	6									17
16	(Italy) Elia Campagnolo	Honda			7	10									15
17	(Italy) Sebastiano Marenzi	KTM			8	9									15
18	(Switzerland) Hansrüdi Klichenmann	KTM			11	8									13
19	(Italy) Nicola Lanza	Gas Gas			10	11									11
20	(Hungary) Istvan Jager	KTM							6	Ret					10
21	(Italy) Diego Ballardini	Gas Gas			12	12									8
22	(Switzerland) Daniel Brunner	KTM			13	13									6
23	(Italy) Federico Minelli	KTM			14	14									4
24	(Italy) Francesco Baldoni	Husqvarna			15	15									2
Pos	Rider	Bike	POR (Portugal)		ITA (Italy)		EST (Estonia)		SWE (Sweden)		POR (Portugal)		FRA (France)		Points
