= Teodor Kabakchiev =

Bulgarian motorcycle rider

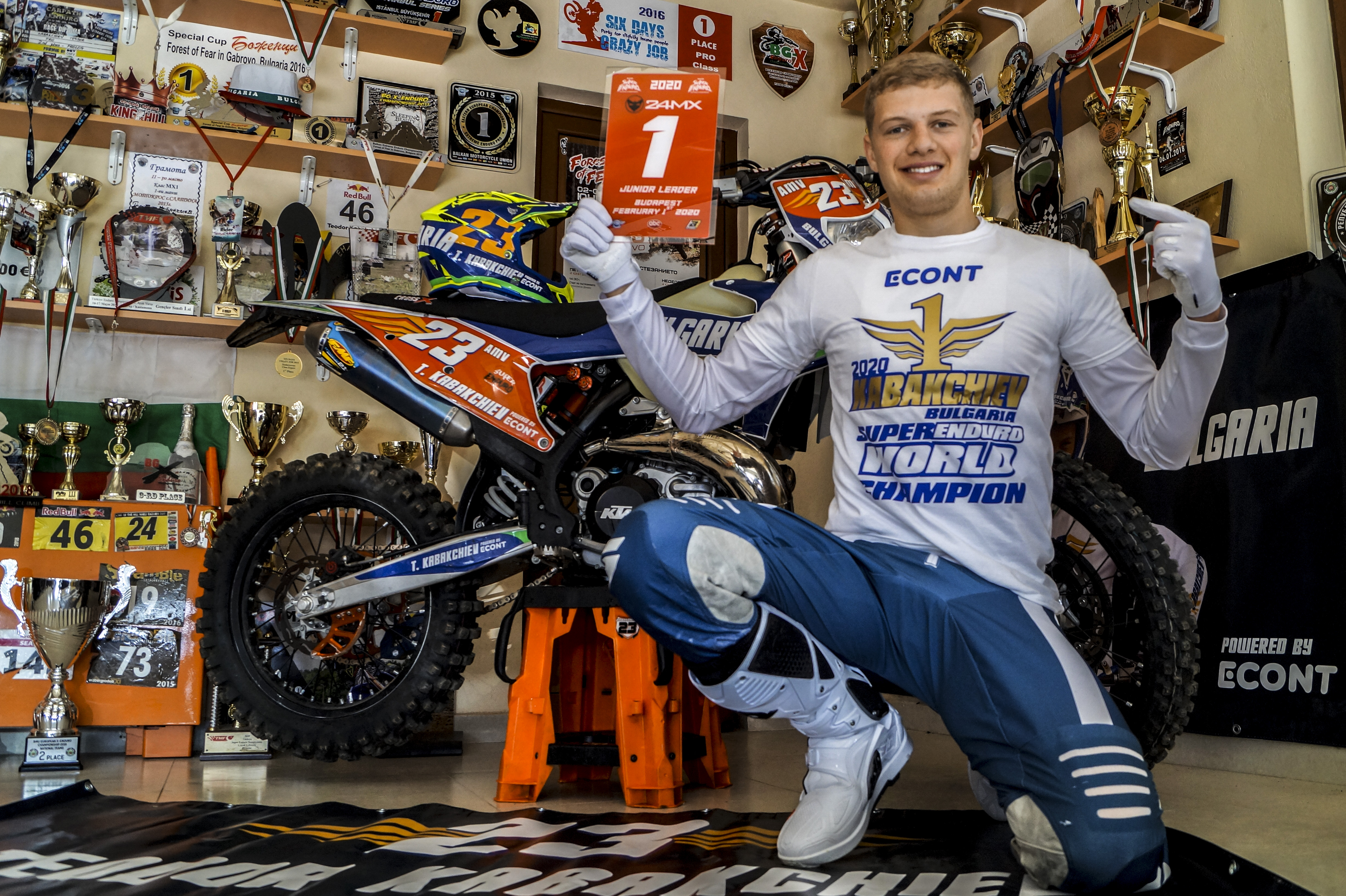
- Teodor Kabakchiev after winning the FIM Superenduro World Championship

Personal information
- Native name: Теодор Кабакчиев
- Nationality: (Bulgaria) Bulgarian
- Born: 16 March 1998 (age 28) Gabrovo, Bulgaria
- Height: 193 cm (6 ft 4 in) (2022)
- Weight: 89 kg (196 lb) (2022)

Sport
- Country: Bulgaria
- Sport: Enduro
Medal record
Representing Bulgaria
World Championships
Bronze medal – third place	2019 Krakow	Junior
Gold medal – first place	2020 A Coruña	Junior
Gold medal – first place	2020 Budapest	Junior
Silver medal – second place	2022 Serbia	Pro
Silver medal – second place	2022 Romania	Pro

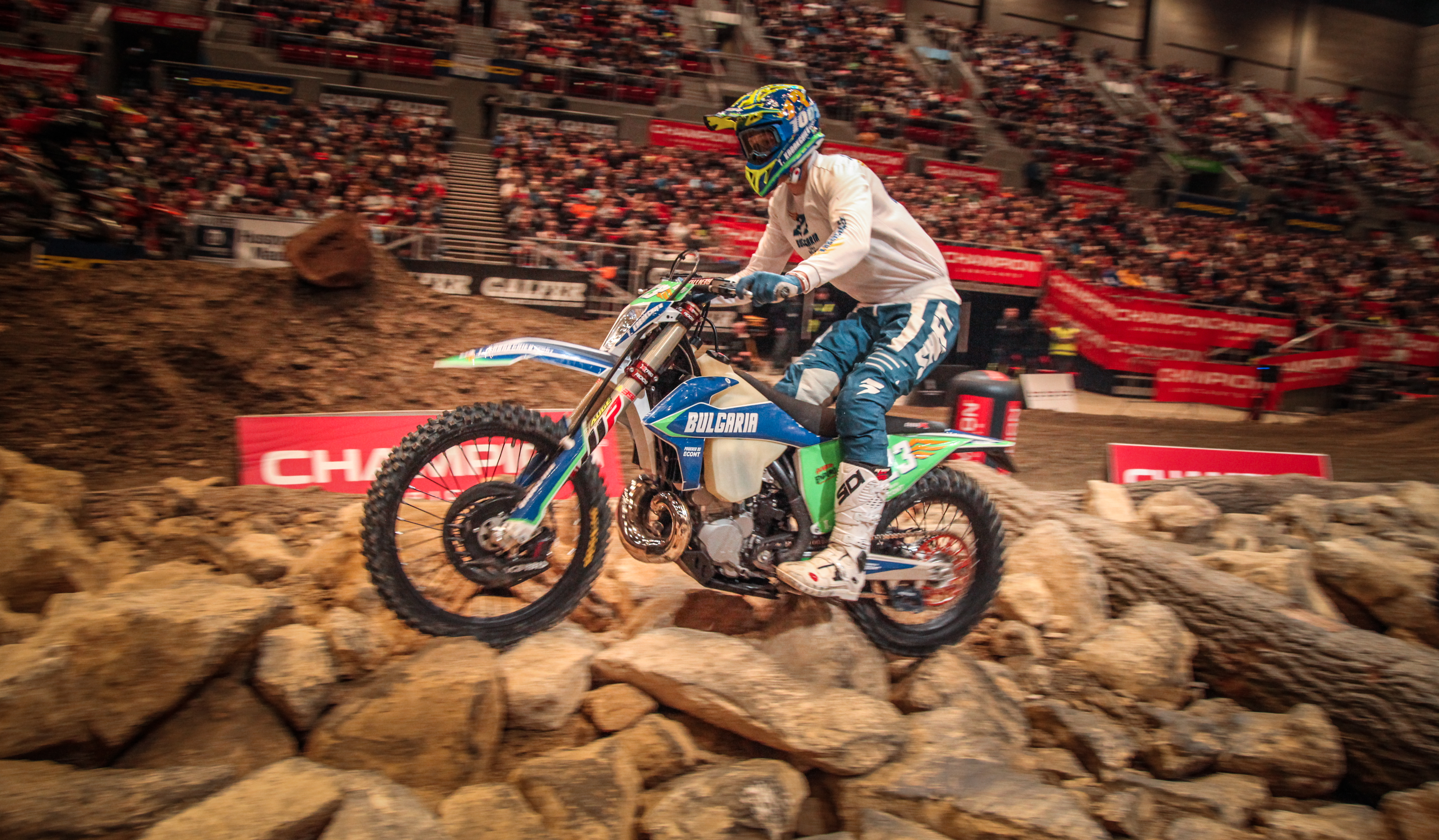
Teodor Kabakchiev at FIM Superenduro World Championship in Budapest - February 2020

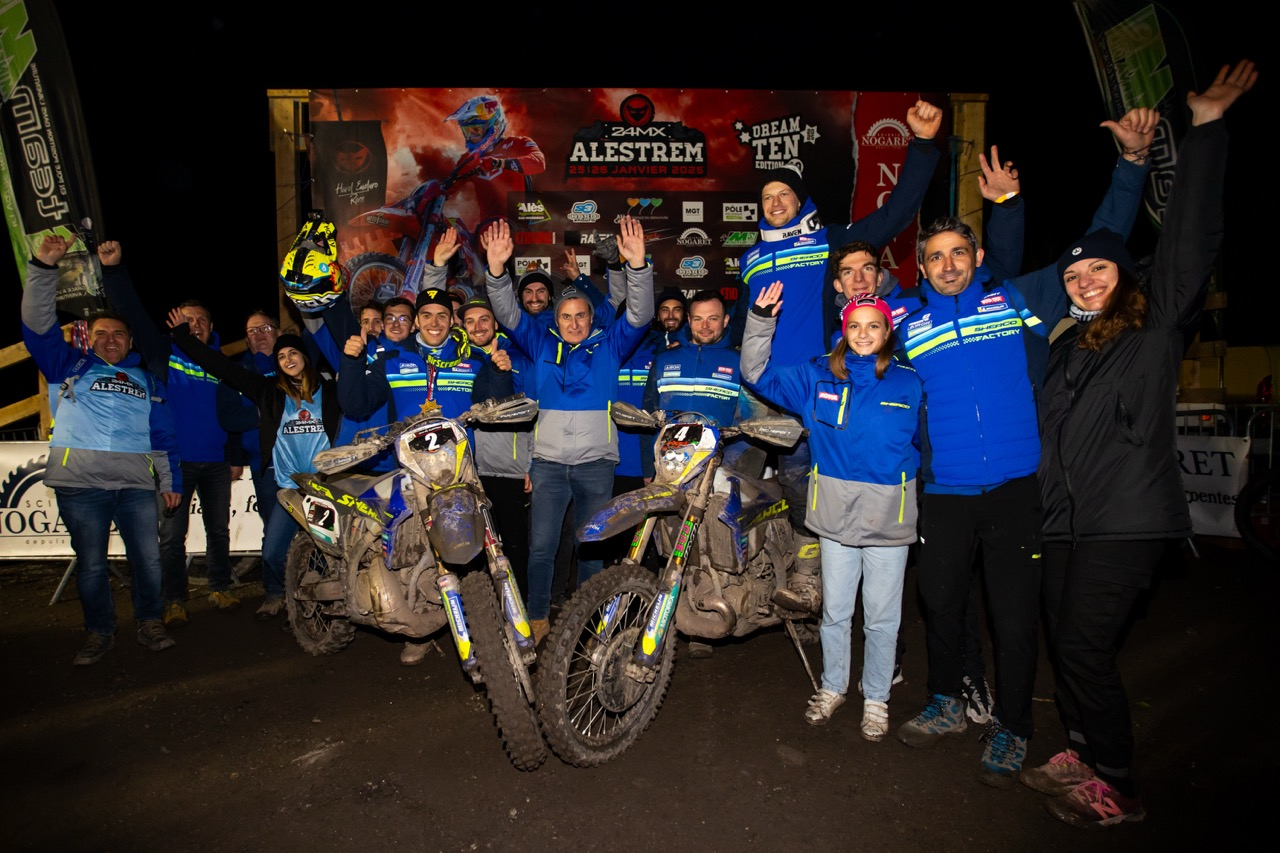
Teodor Kabakchiev and the whole Sherco team after winning Alestrem in 2025.

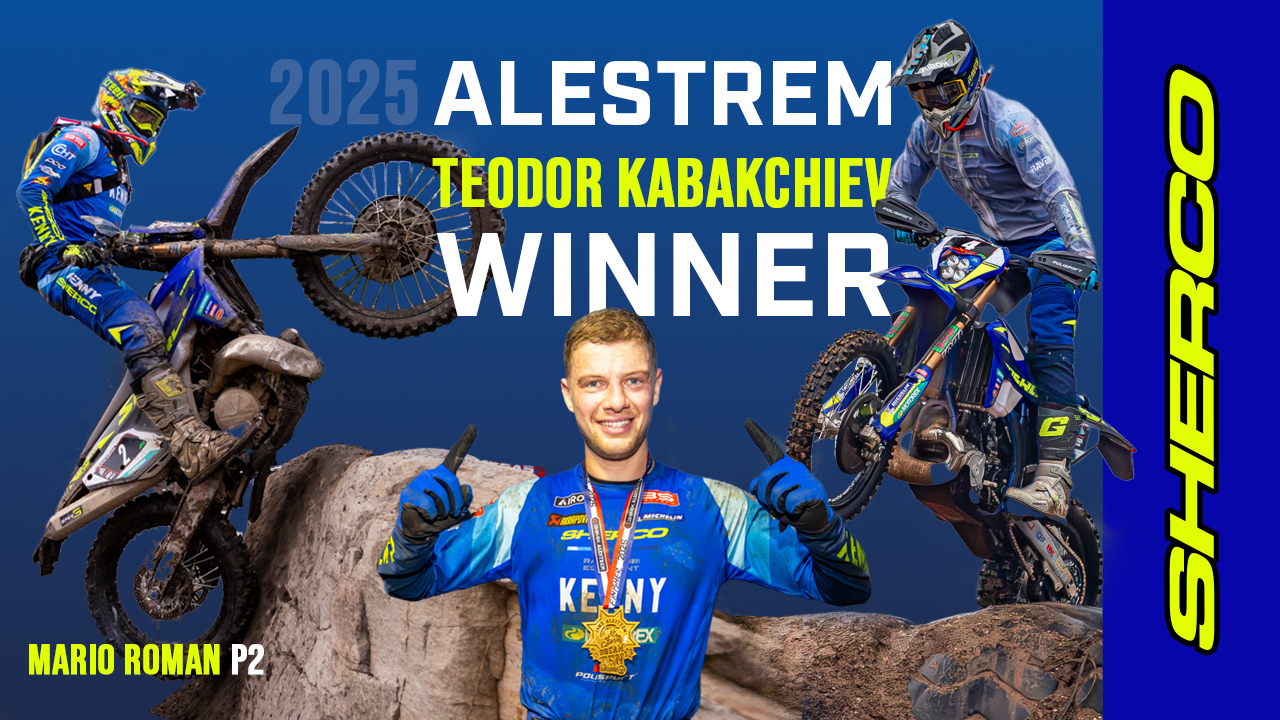
Teodor Kabakchiev (winner) and Mario Roman (runner-up) on a Sherco banner.

Teodor Kabakchiev (born 16 March 1998) is a Bulgarian motorcycle rider who has won professional titles in enduro. He has won the Junior FIM SuperEnduro World Championship, the Spanish Hard Enduro Championship, the BMU European Championship, and the Bulgarian Enduro Championship several times.

Born in Gabrovo, Bulgaria, Teodor received his first bike at the age of 4 as a present for his birthday. He started racing from a very young age and pursued an international racing career.

== World Championship Races ==
Season	Championship	Country	Class	Place
2024	FIM Hard Enduro World Championship	(Spain) Hixpania	Pro	6-th
2024	FIM Hard Enduro World Championship	(Turkey) Sea To Sky	Pro	6-th
2024	FIM Hard Enduro World Championship	(United States) Tennessee KnockOut	Pro	4-th
2024	FIM Hard Enduro World Championship	(Romania) Red Bull Romaniacs	Pro	2nd
2024	FIM Hard Enduro World Championship	(Serbia) Xross Challenge	Pro	2nd
2024	FIM Hard Enduro World Championship	(Austria) Erzberg Rodeo	Pro	DSQ
2024	FIM Hard Enduro World Championship	(United Kingdom) Valleys Extreme	Pro	2nd
2023	FIM Hard Enduro World Championship	(Germany) GetzenRodeo	Pro	4th
2023	FIM Hard Enduro World Championship	(Spain) Hixpania	Pro	7th
2023	FIM Hard Enduro World Championship	(Canada) Red Bull Outliers	Pro	6th
2023	FIM Hard Enduro World Championship	(Romania) Red Bull Romaniacs	Pro	3rd
2023	FIM Hard Enduro World Championship	(Austria) Erzberg Rodeo	Pro	8th
2023	FIM Hard Enduro World Championship	(Serbia) Xross Challenge	Pro	3rd
2022	FIM Hard Enduro World Championship	(Spain) Hixpania	Pro	DNF
2022	FIM Hard Enduro World Championship	(Canada) Red Bull Outliers	Pro	7th
2022	FIM Hard Enduro World Championship	(United States) Tennessee Knock Out	Pro	5th
2022	FIM Hard Enduro World Championship	(Romania) Red Bull Romaniacs	Pro	2nd
2022	FIM Hard Enduro World Championship	(Italy) Red Bull Abestone	Pro	8th
2022	FIM Hard Enduro World Championship	(Austria) Erzberg Rodeo	Pro	DSQ
2022	FIM Hard Enduro World Championship	(Serbia) Xross Challenge	Pro	2nd
2022	FIM Hard Enduro World Championship	(Israel) Minus 400	Pro	6th
2021	FIM Hard Enduro World Championship	(Romania) Red Bull Romaniacs	Pro	8th
2019 / 2020	FIM SuperEnduro World Championship	Hungary	Junior	1st
2019 / 2020	FIM SuperEnduro World Championship	Spain	Junior	1st
2019 / 2020	FIM SuperEnduro World Championship	Germany	Junior	8th
2019 / 2020	FIM SuperEnduro World Championship	Poland	Junior	3rd
2018 / 2019	FIM SuperEnduro World Championship	Spain	Junior	4th
2018 / 2019	FIM SuperEnduro World Championship	Hungary	Junior	7th
2018 / 2019	FIM SuperEnduro World Championship	Spain	Junior	5th
2018 / 2019	FIM SuperEnduro World Championship	Germany	Junior	11th
2018 / 2019	FIM SuperEnduro World Championship	Poland	Junior	9th
2017 / 2018	FIM SuperEnduro World Championship	Spain	Junior	4th
2017 / 2018	FIM SuperEnduro World Championship	Poland	Junior	8th
2017 / 2018	FIM SuperEnduro World Championship	Germany	Junior	9th
2017 / 2018	FIM SuperEnduro World Championship	Poland	Junior	11th
2016 / 2017	FIM SuperEnduro World Championship	Poland	Junior	8th

== International races ==
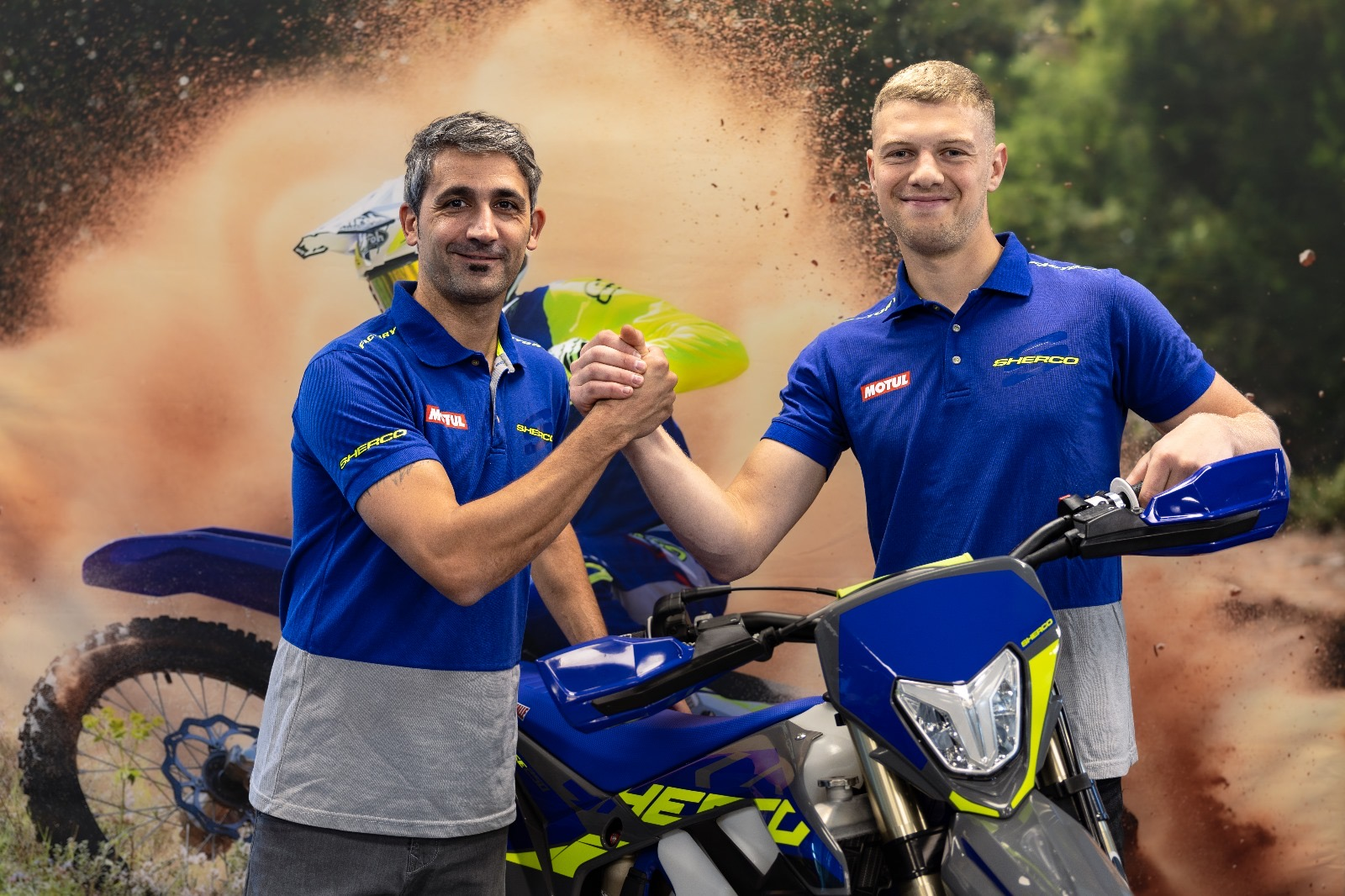
Teodor Kabakchiev after signing for Sherco Factory Team

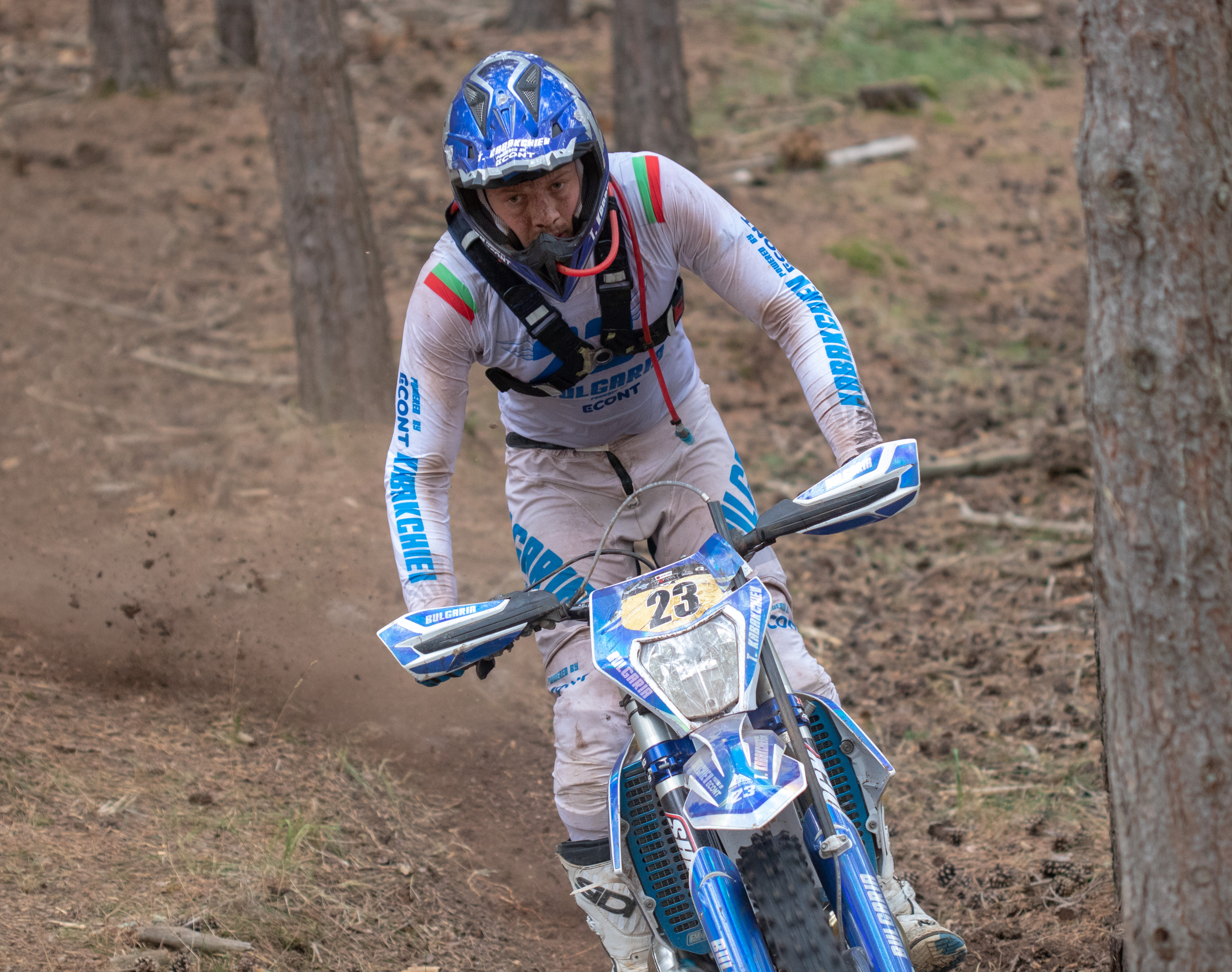
Teodor Kabakchiev in 2023

Season	Race	Country	Class	Place
2025	French Hard Enduro Round 1	France	Pro	1st
2025	Bassella Xtrem Race	Spain	Pro	2nd
2025	Alestrem	France	Pro	1st
2024	SuperEnduro EICMA	Italy	Pro	3rd
2024	Roof of Africa	South Africa	Pro	2nd
2024	CavaExtreme	Italy	Pro	1st
2024	BarãoManiacs	Brazil	Pro	1st
2023	Hiu Selatan	Indonesia	Pro	2nd
2024	French Hard Enduro Round 2	France	Pro	1st
2024	French Hard Enduro Round 1	France	Pro	1st
2024	Bassella Xtrem Race	Spain	Pro	1st
2024	Alestrem	France	Pro	4th
2023	Ukupacha Hard Enduro	Ecuador	Pro	1st
2023	Uncle Hard Enduro	Indonesia	Pro	1st
2023	Spanish Hard Enduro Round 5	Spain	Pro	1st
2023	Hard Enduro Ditrocks	Romania	Pro	1st
2023	Hiu Selatan	Indonesia	Pro	2nd
2023	Hard Enduro Panorama	Romania	Pro	1st
2023	Hard Enduro Arsenal	Romania	Pro	1st
2023	Spanish Hard Enduro Round 4	Spain	Pro	1st
2023	Spanish Hard Enduro Round 3	Spain	Pro	2nd
2023	Spanish Hard Enduro Round 2	Spain	Pro	1st
2023	24MX Alestrem	France	Pro	4th
2023	Spanish Hard Enduro Round 1	Spain	Pro	3rd
2022	Uncle Hard Enduro	Indonesia	Pro	1st
2022	Hard Enduro Panorama	Romania	Pro	1st
2022	Hard Enduro Arsenal	Romania	Pro	2nd
2022	Spanish Hard Enduro Round 2	Spain	Pro	1st
2022	Spanish Hard Enduro Round 1	Spain	Pro	2nd
2022	Sierra Hard Enduro	Mexico	Pro	1st
2021	Sea To Sky	Turkey	Pro	5th
2021	Ditrocks Hard Enduro	Romania	Pro	1st
2021	Xtreme Sherco Sevlievo	Bulgaria	Pro	1st
2021	Hard Enduro Piatra Craiului	Romania	Pro	1st
2021	RevLimiter	(United States) USA	Pro	8th
2020	Red Bull Romaniacs Hard Enduro Rallye	Romania	Gold	8th
2019	Xross Challenge	Serbia	Pro	2nd
2018	Erzberg Rodeo	Austria	Rocket Ride	3rd
2018	Enduro Fenix	Bosnia and Herzegovina	Pro	2nd
2018	BMU European Enduro Championship	(North Macedonia) Macedonia	Pro	1st
2018	Six Days Crazy Job	Bulgaria	Pro	1st
2017	Superenduro Istanbul	Turkey	Pro	1st
2017	Red Bull Sea to Sky	Turkey	Pro	12th
2017	Red Bull Romaniacs Hard Enduro Rallye	Romania	Gold	15th
2017	Erzberg Rodeo	Austria	Hare Scramble	27th
2016	Sea to Sky	Turkey	Pro	11th
2016	Six Days Crazy Job	Bulgaria	Pro	1st
2016	Erzberg Rodeo	Austria	Endurocross	1st
2016	Enduro World Championship	Greece	Junior	15th
2016	BMU European Enduro Championship	Romania	Pro	1st
2015	Red Arena	Turkey	Pro	2nd
2015	Erzberg Rodeo	Austria	Red Bull Hare Scramble	26th
2015	King of the Hill	Romania	Standart	3rd

== Bulgarian National Championship ==
Season	Series	Class	Place
2019	BG-X Enduro Championship	Pro	1st
2018	BG-X Enduro Championship	Pro	1st
2017	BG-X Enduro Championship	Pro	1st
2016	BG-X Enduro Championship	Pro	1st
2015	BG-X Enduro Championship	Pro	1st
2014	BG-X Enduro Championship	Pro	1st
2013	BG-X Enduro Championship	Pro	2nd
2012	BG-X Enduro Championship	Standart	2nd
2010	BG-X Enduro Championship	Mini Junior	2nd
2009	BG-X Enduro Championship	Mini Junior	1st
2008	BG-X Enduro Championship	Mini Junior	2nd
