= Manuel Lettenbichler =

German hard enduro racer

- Nationality: German
- Born: 30 April 1998 (age 28); Rosenheim
- Current team: Red Bull KTM Factory Racing
- Bike number: 304

Manuel Lettenbichler (born 30 April 1998) is a German professional Enduro racer. Lettenbichler specialises in the discipline of Hard Enduro, where he is a four-time FIM Hard Enduro world champion.

Alongside his Hard Enduro world titles, Lettenbichler has won the Red Bull Romaniacs Hard Enduro Rallye seven times and the Erzberg Rodeo five times.

Lettenbichler is the son of Andreas Lettenbichler, a retired German Trials and Hard Enduro rider.

Throughout his career, Lettenbichler has competed for the Red Bull KTM Factory Racing team, the same team his father enjoyed success for during his career.

== Career ==
Following in the footsteps of his father, Lettenbichler began riding off-road motorcycles at the age of five. He first came to prominence on the international stage when he finished third in the 2015 FIM SuperEnduro Junior World Championship, an achievement made whilst being the youngest rider in the class. In 2016, he was able to win the SuperEnduro Junior World Championship, with a 59-point advantage over his nearest competitor.

Lettenbichler moved to the World Enduro Super Series (WESS) for the 2018 season, as the Red Bull KTM team moved their operations into the championship that rivalled FIM-sanctioned championships. In the inaugural season, he would finish as runner-up. A year later in 2019, he would win the WESS title, becoming the youngest winner of the Red Bull Romaniacs Hard Enduro Rallye in the process. Whilst the WESS championship was cancelled in 2020 due to the COVID-19 pandemic, Lettenbichler repeated his Romaniacs victory, with the event running later in the year due to restrictions.

The WESS championship became sanctioned by the FIM as the FIM Hard Enduro World Championship from 2021 onwards, with Lettenbichler finished as runner-up behind Billy Bolt in that first season. From 2022 to 2025, Lettenbichler would win the FIM Hard Enduro World Championship, in a four-year run as champion. In the 2023 season, Lettenbichler achieved the feat of going unbeaten throughout the championship, winning each round to record a perfect season. Alongside these titles, he would take further wins at the Romaniacs event in 2021, 2023, 2024, 2025 and 2026. Lettenbichler has also taken victory in the Erzberg Rodeo event each year 2022–2026.

== Honours ==
FIM Hard Enduro World Championship

- Hard Enduro World Championship: 2022, 2023, 2024 & 2025 (gold)

World Enduro Super Series

- WESS: 2019 (gold)

FIM SuperEnduro World Championship

- Junior: 2015/16 (gold)
