= Erzberg Rodeo =

Enduro race in Austria

Coordinates: 47°31′30″N 14°54′42″E

- Category: Motorcycle sport Motorcycle racing
- Country: Austria
- Inaugural season: 1995
- Riders: 1,500
- Official website: www.erzbergrodeo.at//

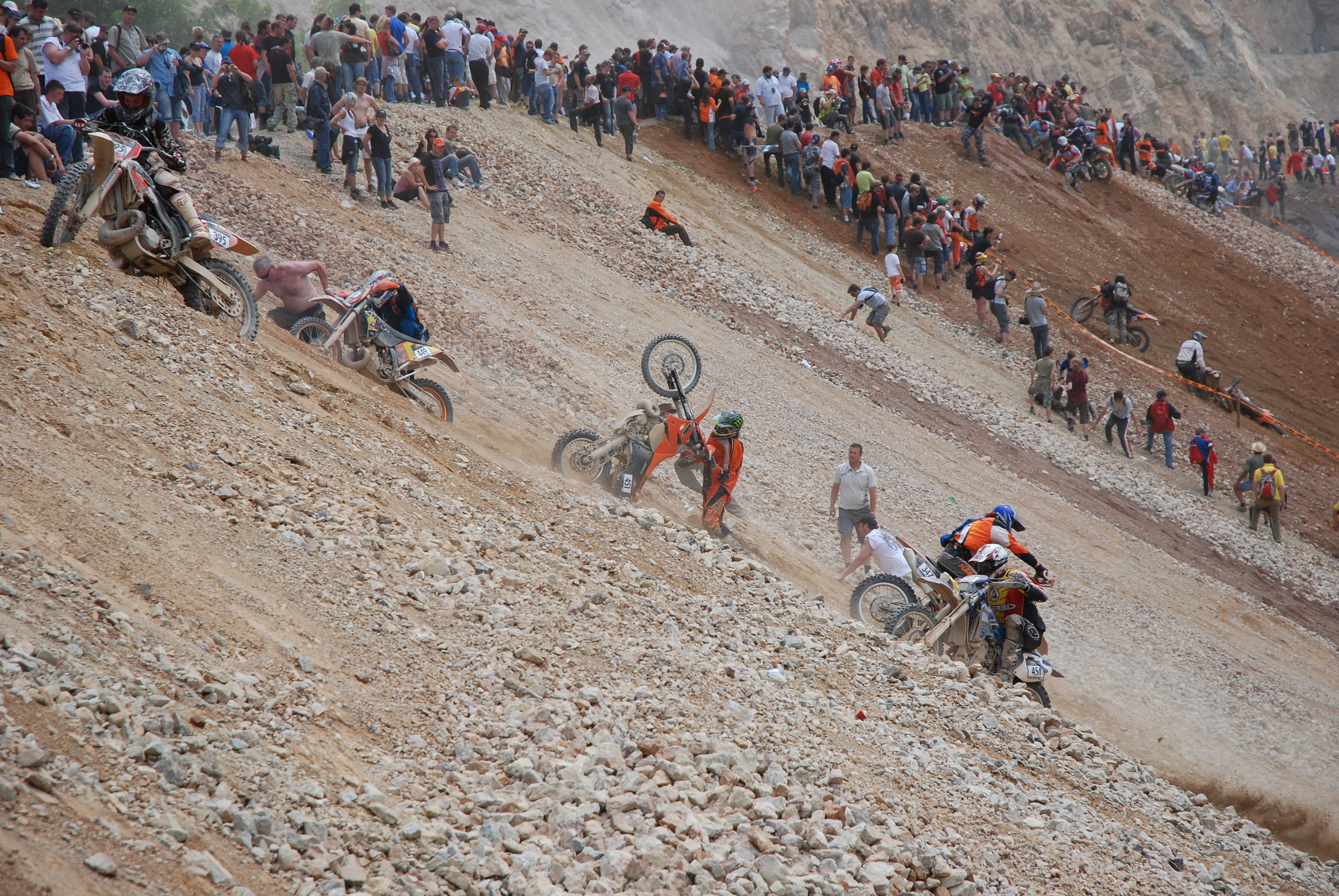
Start quarry

The Erzberg Rodeo is an Austrian motorcycle enduro event started in 1995 and held annually in May or June, run on ore. It is the largest of its kind in Europe.

The Erzberg Rodeo is part of the Red Bull Hard Enduro Series, together with Red Bull Romaniacs, Red Bull Minas Riders, Red Bull Megawatt, Red Bull Sea to Sky, and Roof of Africa. In 2018 it joined the World Enduro Super Series, which became the FIM Hard Enduro World Championship in 2021.

== Races ==
The four-day event consists of the following races:

- Thursday: "2 - cylinder elite class", two runs (2005 was the first, with about 60 starters) on the prologue route.

Since 2008, the Rodeo-X Endurocross competition, instead of the elite class, has been held on Thursday. The 2-cylinder machines start in the normal "Iron Road Prologue" in class "Desert Bomber".

During the event the Rodeo-X shows some of the world's best motocross riders doing spectacular stunts and breakneck jumps. Since 2009 has been part of this program and on Thursday, another side event, the so-called Rocket Ride. In this steep slope race, which is held on one of the slopes of the Hare Scramble start, 300 riders start the 3-part slope to climb in record time. The top 48 riders in the qualification round then go to a knockout system in groups of 6 riders, each of which the top 3 to qualify for the next round at the end of the Rocket Ride Champion determined.

- Friday and Saturday: one run of the "Iron Road Prologue" on a 13 km long gravel path to the vicinity of the summit. The prologue is also the qualifying for Sunday. Here several classes start: Desert Bomber (multi-cylinder bikes), street bikes, scooters and mopeds, women's class until 2004 Standard Singles (street-legal single-cylinder enduro) and since 2004 Quads. The starting field is limited to 1,500 participants. The starters go in 20 to 40 seconds interval between 9.00 and about 17:00 on track.

Since 2008, competitors from over 40 countries competed.

- Sunday 12:00 to 16:00: the highlight of the "Red Bull Hare Scramble". The top 500 of the prologue are eligible to start on Sunday. The route is changed every year. For the 35 km long route, the winners usually require between one and a half and two hours. Of the 500 starters, rarely more than 30 come within the four-hour-long race to the finish.

== History ==
For the economically weak region, the Erzberg Rodeo is a growing source of income and is supported not only by the local politics but also the Austrian state of Styria.

Karl Katoch is the organizer of this international event and is also considered as its founder.

2015: The 2015 hare scramble took an interesting turn with the addition of several new difficult areas of the course. A section known as Carl's Dinner was revamped to be longer and more difficult, as well as the addition of a new impassable section, known simply as Downtown. A section where riders were forced down into a ravine and were forced to climb a very steep muddy hill. First to arrive was Graham Jarvis after passing Walker shortly before due to a blown radiator on Walkers bike. Second to arrive to the new Downtown section was Alfredo Gomez who had also passed Walker for the same reason. After a while Walker was able to let his bike cool down and ascend a hill he was previously stuck on, to which he then met Jarvis and Gomez at Downtown and was shortly followed by Andreas Lettenbichler. After getting stuck as well, the four riders and friends banded together to ensure they all made it up the hill, each one helping the others pull their bikes up. When all four reached the top, they had very little time to finish, roughly 20 minutes, as the friends made their way coasting in celebration to the finish where they all took the podium with quick succession.

== Hare Scramble winners ==
Year	Winner	Country	Bike
1995	Alfie Cox	South Africa	KTM
1996	Christian Pfeiffer	Germany	GasGas
1997	Christian Pfeiffer ^{(2)}	Germany	GasGas
1998	Giovanni Sala	Italy	KTM
1999	Stefano Passeri	Italy	KTM
2000	Christian Pfeiffer ^{(3)}	Germany	GasGas
2001	Juha Salminen	Finland	KTM
2002	Cyril Despres	France	KTM
2003	Cyril Despres ^{(2)}	France	KTM
2004	Christian Pfeiffer ^{(4)}	Germany	GasGas
2005	David Knight	United Kingdom	KTM
2006	David Knight ^{(2)}	United Kingdom	KTM
2007	Tadeusz Błażusiak	Poland	KTM
2008	Tadeusz Błażusiak ^{(2)}	Poland	KTM
2009	Tadeusz Błażusiak ^{(3)}	Poland	KTM
2010	Tadeusz Błażusiak ^{(4)}	Poland	KTM
2011	Tadeusz Błażusiak ^{(5)}	Poland	KTM
2012	Jonny Walker	United Kingdom	KTM
2013	Graham Jarvis	United Kingdom	Husaberg
2014	Jonny Walker ^{(2)}	United Kingdom	KTM
2015	Jonny Walker ^{(3)}, Graham Jarvis ^{(2)}, Alfredo Gomez, Andreas Lettenbichler	United Kingdom Spain Germany	KTM Husqvarna
2016	Graham Jarvis ^{(3)}	United Kingdom	Husqvarna
2017	Alfredo Gomez ^{(2)}	Spain	KTM
2018	Graham Jarvis ^{(4)}	United Kingdom	Husqvarna
2019	Graham Jarvis ^{(5)}	United Kingdom	Husqvarna
2022	Manuel Lettenbichler	Germany	KTM
2023	Manuel Lettenbichler ^{(2)}	Germany	KTM
2024	Manuel Lettenbichler ^{(3)}	Germany	KTM
2025	Manuel Lettenbichler ^{(4)}	Germany	KTM
2026	Manuel Lettenbichler ^{(5)}	Germany	KTM

Source: Results of Red Bull Erzberg Rodeo

== Records ==
Most finishers: 51 (1999)

Fewest finishers: 5 (2015)

Most wins: 5 (Tadeusz Błażusiak, Graham Jarvis, Manuel Lettenbichler)

Youngest finisher: Manuel Lettenbichler - 16 years old (2014)

Youngest winner: Manuel Lettenbichler - 24 years old (2022)

Most wins by manufacturer: KTM - 19
