= FIM SuperEnduro World Championship =

Motorcycle racing championship

The FIM SuperEnduro World Championship is an endurocross series held primarily in Europe since 2007. It is held from October to March, during the Northern Hemisphere winter and the Enduro World Championship off-season. Circuits are built inside stadiums or arenas, recreating obstacles such as rocks, boulders and logs.

The series had its first season in 2007–08 under the name FIM Indoor Enduro World Cup. In 2010–11 it was renamed FIM Indoor Enduro World Championship and in 2011/12 it adopted its current designation.

The championship is promoted since 2012–13 by ABC Communication, the same company as the Enduro World Championship. It introduced junior and women's classes in addition to the men's Prestige class. For the 2013–14 season, the schedule expanded to include two events in the Americas (Brasil and Mexico).

== Venues ==
The longest-running event is the Barcelona Indoor Enduro, where endurocross debuted in 2000.

- (Spain) Barcelona (2007/08 - 2013/14)
- (Spain) Madrid (2008/09, 2015/16)
- (Spain) Vigo (2009/10)
- (Spain) Munich (2007/08)
- (Italy) Genova (2007/08 - 2010/11)
- (Germany) Riesa (2014/15 - 2016/17)
- (Germany) Prague (2015/16)
- (Poland) Lodz (2011/12 - 2013/14, 2015/16)
- (Poland) Gdansk (2014/15)
- (Poland) Krakow (2016/17)
- (Finland) Helsinki (2014/15)
- (France) Cahors (2014/15)
- (France) Tours (2011/12 - 2013/14)
- (United Kingdom) Sheffield (2009/10)
- (United Kingdom) Liverpool (2012/13 - 2013/14)
- (Brazil) Pinamar (2015/16)
- (Brazil) Belo Horizonte (2012/13 - 2015/16)
- (Mexico) Guadalajara (2012/13 - 2014/15)

== Men medallists ==
Event	Gold		Silver		Bronze	
2007/08	David Knight; Great Britain	KTM	Tadeusz Blazusiak; Poland	KTM	Mika Ahola; Finland	Honda
2008/09	Iván Cervantes; Spain	KTM	Tadeusz Blazusiak; Poland	KTM	Fabio Mossini; San Marino	Honda
2009/10	Tadeusz Blazusiak; Poland	KTM	Iván Cervantes; Spain	KTM	Joakim Ljunggren; Sweden	Husaberg
2010/11	Tadeusz Blazusiak; Poland	KTM	Joakim Ljunggren; Sweden	Husaberg	Mika Ahola; Finland	HM-Honda
2011/12	Tadeusz Blazusiak; Poland	KTM	Jonny Walker; Great Britain	KTM	Joakim Ljunggren; Sweden	Husaberg
2012/13	Tadeusz Blazusiak; Poland	KTM	David Knight; Great Britain	Honda	Jonny Walker; Great Britain	KTM
2013/14	Tadeusz Blazusiak; Poland	KTM	David Knight; Great Britain	Sherco	Jonny Walker; Great Britain	KTM
2014/15	Tadeusz Blazusiak; Poland	KTM	Cody Webb; United States	KTM	Jonny Walker; Great Britain	KTM
2015/16	Colton Haaker; United States	Husqvarna	Cody Webb; United States	KTM	Jonny Walker; Great Britain	KTM
2016/17	Colton Haaker; United States	Husqvarna	Alfredo Gómez; Spain	KTM	Jonny Walker; Great Britain	KTM
2017/18	Cody Webb; United States	KTM	Billy Bolt; Great Britain	Husqvarna	Tadeusz Blazusiak; Poland	KTM
2018/19	Colton Haaker; United States	Husqvarna	Cody Webb; United States	KTM	Tadeusz Blazusiak; Poland	KTM
2019/20	Billy Bolt; Great Britain	Husqvarna	Tadeusz Blazusiak; Poland	KTM	Jonny Walker; Great Britain	Beta
2020/21	Cancelled due to COVID-19					
2021/22	Billy Bolt; Great Britain	Husqvarna	Jonny Walker; Great Britain	Beta	Colton Haaker; United States	Husqvarna
2022/23	Billy Bolt; Great Britain	Husqvarna	Jonny Walker; Great Britain	Beta	Tadeusz Błażusiak; Poland	GasGas
2023/24	Billy Bolt; Great Britain	Husqvarna	Jonny Walker; Great Britain	Beta	Manuel Lettenbichler; Germany	KTM
2024/25	Billy Bolt; Great Britain	Husqvarna	Jonny Walker; Great Britain	Triumph	Ashton Brightmore; Great Britain	Gas Gas
2025/26	Billy Bolt; Great Britain	Husqvarna	Jonny Walker; Great Britain	Triumph	Mitch Brightmore; Great Britain	Gas Gas

== Women medallists ==
Event	Gold		Silver		Bronze	
2014	Emma Bristow; Great Britain	Sherco	Jane Daniels; Great Britain	Husqvarna	Sandra Gómez; Spain	Husaberg
2015	Emma Bristow; Great Britain	Sherco	Sandra Gómez; Spain	Husqvarna	Jane Daniels; Great Britain	Husqvarna
2016	Sandra Gómez; Spain	Husqvarna	Emma Bristow; Great Britain	Sherco	Maria Franke; Germany	Yamaha

== Most wins ==
As of the 2024/25 season:

- (Poland) Taddy Blazusiak: 42
- (United Kingdom) Billy Bolt: 28
- (United Kingdom) David Knight: 7
- (Spain) Iván Cervantes: 6
- (United Kingdom) Jonathan Walker: 3
- (Spain) Daniel Gibert: 2
- (France) Antoine Méo: 1
- (Italy) Thomas Oldrati: 1
- (Sweden) Joakim Ljunggren: 1
- (Finland) Mika Ahola: 1
- (Spain) Daniel Gibert: 1
- (Spain) Alfredo Gómez: 1
- (France) Mathias Bellino: 1
