= Mario Román =

Andorran motorcyclist

- Nationality: (Spain) Spanish
- Born: 16 January 1991 (age 35); Spain
- Current team: Sherco Racing Factory
- Bike number: 74
- Website: Official web site

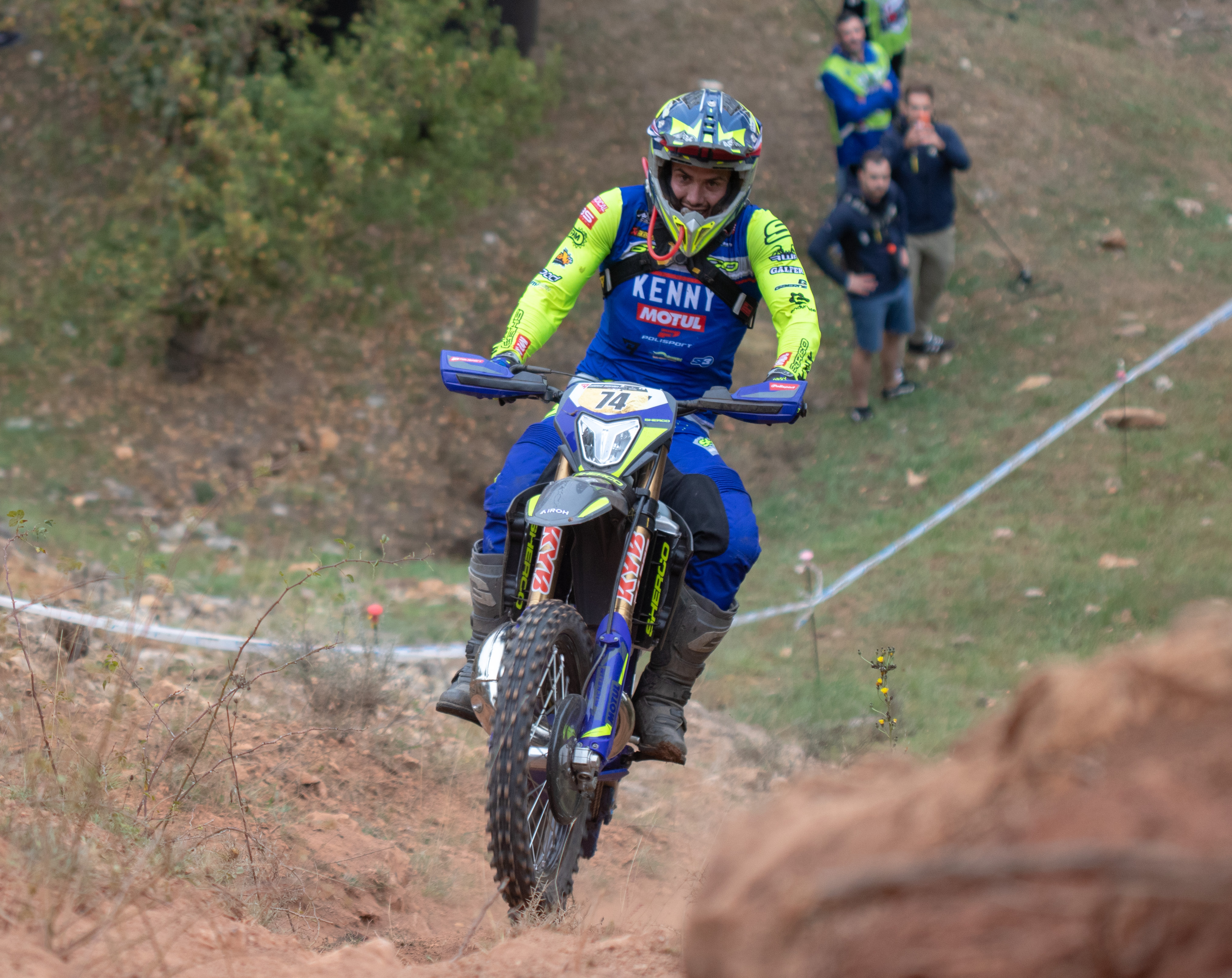
Mario Román Serrano in 2023

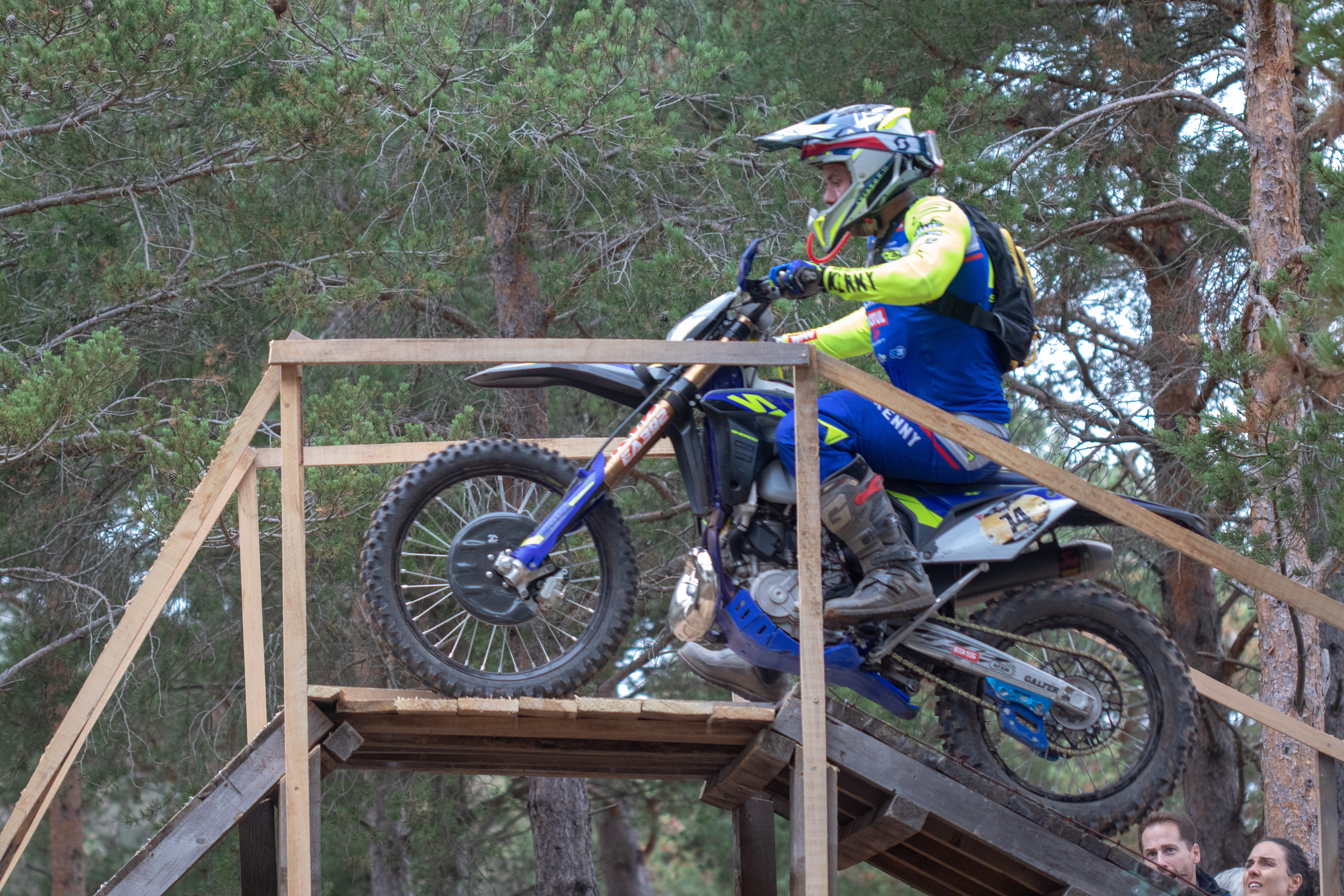
Mario Roman in the 24MX Hixpania Hard Enduro 2023

Mario Román (born 16 January 1991 in Spain), is an Extreme Enduro rider.

Román's achievements include winning the EL INKA hard enduro 2019 - Peru, Hell's Gate Metzeler 2018, Alestrem 2018, Toyota Porto Extreme XL Lagares, in Portugal 2019, tenth edition of Sea to Sky.

Román is a Factory Team Rider for Sherco Racing Factory.
