= Giovanni Thun Hohenstein =

Italian officer (1913–1938)

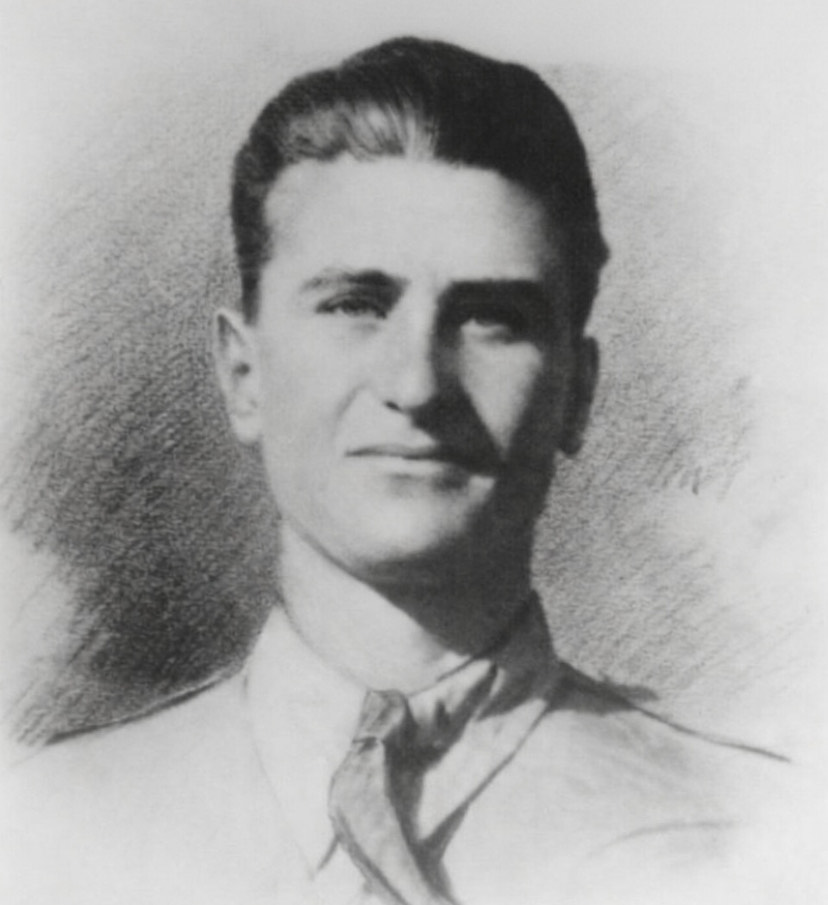
- Born: December 22, 1913; Vienna, Austria Hungary
- Died: March 28, 1938 (aged 24); Italian East Africa
- Military career
- Allegiance: Italy
- Branch: Royal Italian Army
- Service years: 1934–1938
- Rank: Second lieutenant
- Commands: 1st Colonial Cavalry Squadron Group
- Conflicts: Second Italo-Ethiopian War
- Awards: Gold Medal of Military Valor

Giovanni Thun Hohenstein (born John von Thun und Hohenstein; 22 December 1913 – 28 March 1938) was an Austrian noble who served in the Royal Italian Army. He was posthumously decorated with the Gold Medal of Military Valour during the major colonial police operations in Italian East Africa.

== Biography ==
He was born in Vienna on 22 December 1913, the son of Ernesto and Monica Chamarè Harbuval. He was a member of a noble family of Austrian origin, the House of Thun und Hohenstein. On 3 November 1934 he was admitted to the Reserve Officer Cadet School in Pinerolo. He graduated as an officer cadet in June 1935 and was assigned to the Vittorio Emanuele II Regiment.

Promoted to second lieutenant the following September, he was discharged in June 1936, only to be recalled a few months later upon his own request. Assigned to the Royal Corps of Eritrean Colonial Troops, he embarked from Naples on 19 November of the same year.

After arriving in Massawa, he was transferred to the 1st Colonial Cavalry Squadron Group, and with the 1st Squadron he took part in the large colonial police operations carried out to pacify Italian East Africa.

He was killed in combat on 28 March 1938 during clashes with Ethiopian guerrillas and was posthumously awarded the Gold Medal of Military Valor. His medal citation reads:

On 28 March 1938, at the head of his cavalry unit, he led his men in an epic charge, the aim of which was sacrifice for the benefit of other units. Bold, distinguished, courageous by temperament, he sacrificed his proud youth in defence of a superior, whose life he saved by sacrificing his own. An officer who personified the highest qualities of his Corps. Mount Tigh, 28 March 1938.
