= Jonny Walker (motorcyclist) =

British motorcycle racer

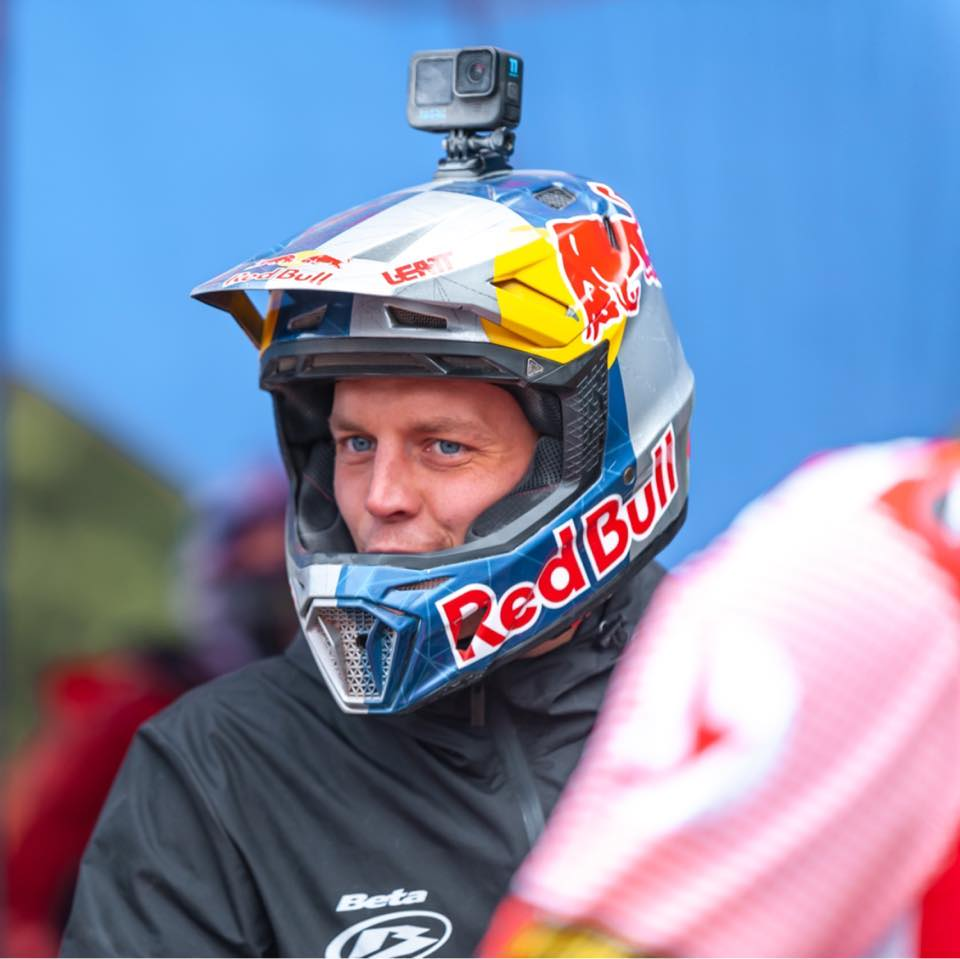
- Jonny Walker Off-Road Racer
- Nationality: British
- Born: 27 January 1991 (age 35); Keswick, U.K.
- Current team: Triumph Motorcycles Ltd
- Bike number: 22

Jonny Walker (born 27 January 1991 in Keswick, United Kingdom) is a British motorcycle rider who has won professional titles in Enduro and one time he was under the title the best enduro rider in the world. He won the Erzberg Rodeo, red bull 111 Megawatt twice, MAXXIS FIM Superenduro World Championship, an annual Austrian extreme enduro event, three times; Romaniacs twice: Hells Gate and The Tough One once. Walker has also won many second and third-place positions on the podium.

Walker has been riding since the age of nine. He began by competing in the British Schoolboy Trials Championship, which he won twice, and maintained a top-three ranking until he was 17. Walker was also the youngest-ever winner of The Pinhard Prize, an accolade awarded to under-21s who are deemed to be the highest achievers. In 2008 and 2009, Walker competed in the European and Junior World Trials Championships, but after several years in Trials, he hankered after a different challenge.

Walker began his hard enduro campaign aboard KTM machinery in 2010. As a then 19-year-old, he worked his way up the enduro ranks before signing his first official agreement with KTM in 2011.

From 2022, Walker started working with Beta Motorcycles riding the Beta RR 300 Racing supported by Beta Factory Racing.

In December 2024, Walker signed with Triumph Factory Racing Enduro Team to ride the newly developed TF250 Enduro. On its first competitive enduro outing, he secured pole position and three race wins, which ensured a historic victory for Triumph.
