= Billy Bolt =

English motorcycle racer

William ‘Billy’ Bolt
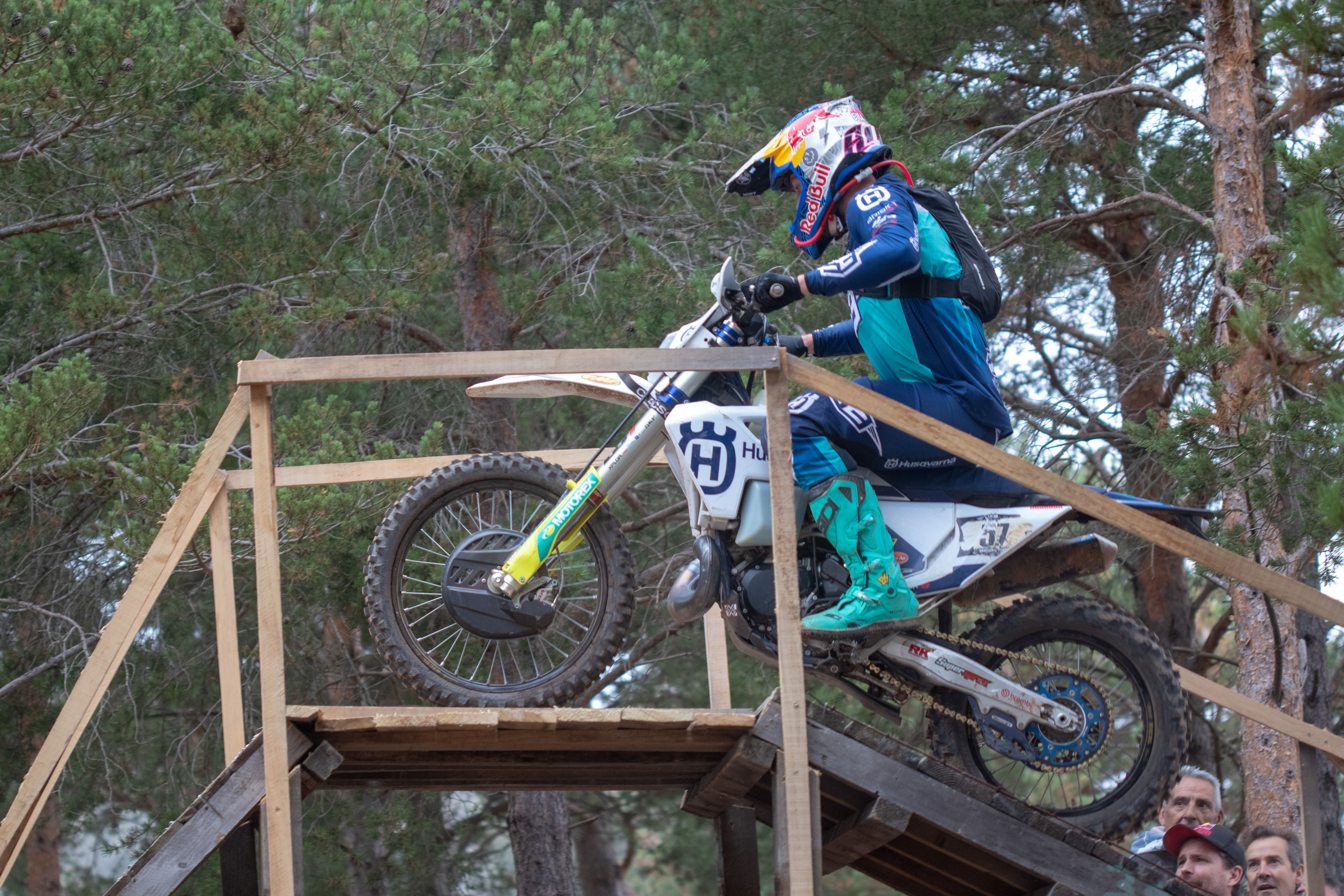
- Billy Bolt, 2023
- Nationality: British
- Born: 17 August 1997 (age 29); Wallsend, North Tyneside, United Kingdom
- Current team: Husqvarna
- Bike number: 57

Billy Bolt (born 17 August 1997 in Wallsend, United Kingdom) is an English motorcycle rider who has won professional titles in trial, enduro and endurocross. He has won the FIM SuperEnduro World Championship six times, and was the first to win the FIM Hard Enduro World Championship.

== Racing career ==
Billy Bolt started showing interest in motorcycles from a young age, inheriting the love for the occupation from his father.

In 2016, Bolt embarked on his initial foray into professional enduro racing, assuming the role of a privateer rider and honing his skills through practical experience on the circuit.

In 2018, he won the World Enduro Super Series. In 2019, he had to undergo a leg surgery.

In 2020, he won the FIM SuperEnduro World Championship for the first time, after sitting out the 2019 series due to an injury. Riding a Husqvarna, he won 7 races out of 12.

In 2021, Billy Bolt became the first ever FIM Hard Enduro World Championship.

In 2022, he won FIM SuperEnduro World Championship second year straight (the 2021 season was cancelled due to the COVID-19 pandemic).

In 2023, he won FIM SuperEnduro World Championship third year straight.

== Honours ==
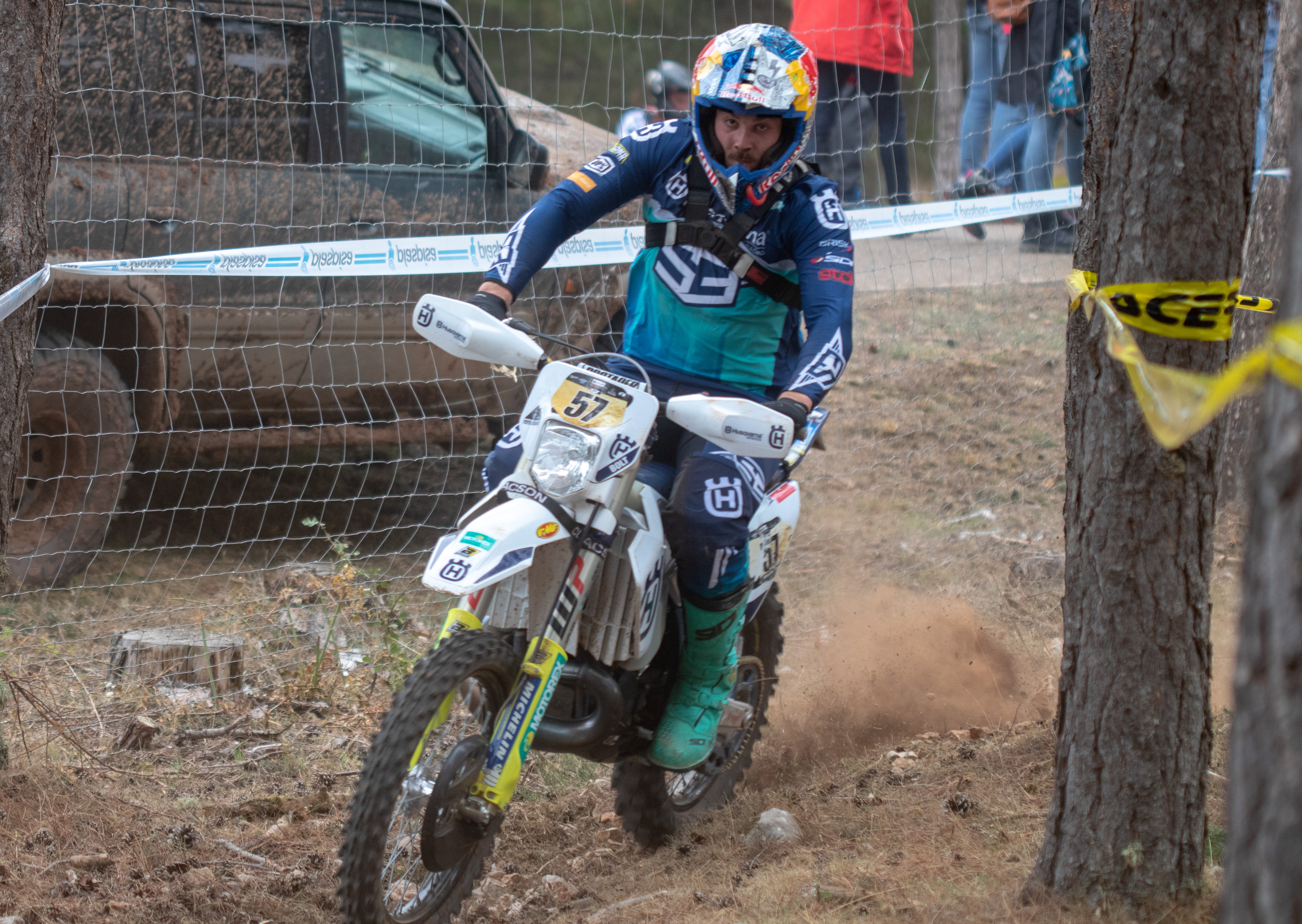
Billy Bolt in 2023

- FIM SuperEnduro World Championship winner:
  - 2020, 2022, 2023, 2024,2025 and 2026
- FIM Hard Enduro World Championship winner:
  - 2021
- World Enduro Super Series winner:
  - 2018
