= Red Bull Romaniacs =

Annual Romanian off-road motorcycle race

Logo

Red Bull Romaniacs is an annual off-road motorcycle race held in Sibiu, Romania. It was founded in 2004 by Martin Freinademetz. The event attracts competitors from over 52 nations each year. The competition spans five days, with the first day featuring an in-city Prologue, followed by four days of off-road racing on enduro trails in the regions surrounding Sibiu and the Southern Carpathian Mountains.

The event is part of the FIM Hard Enduro World Championship Series.

Organizer Martin Freinademetz conceived the idea for a hard enduro rally in the Transylvania region after visiting the Carpathian Mountains that surround the historic city of Sibiu.

The Red Bull Romaniacs Hard Enduro Rallye is organized under the patronage of the Romanian National Tourism Authority.

== Prologue ==
The Prologue is held on Bulevardul Coposu, the main street in the city center of Sibiu. It then moves to the nearby mountains and forests, where competitors must prove their endurance and riding skills. Each year, a different Prologue course and off-road race tracks are created.

== Tracks ==
The tracks cross mountain areas, rocky terrain, hills, and valleys, with tarmac being avoided as much as possible. The length of the tracks varies between 100 km and 180 km each day, depending on the class in which the competitor enters. The main challenges include technical sections that pass through wooded areas, where competitors face natural terrain obstacles, such as trees, rocks, mud, and steep inclines. Petrol fuel stops, or tank stops, are placed at intervals of approximately 70 km, allowing contestants to refuel their motorcycles and refresh themselves.

The track is marked with banners, signs, and colored markings, and it is loaded onto a GPS to ensure safety. There are also specially designed spectator points along the route.

== List of winners ==
Graham Jarvis and Manuel Lettenbichler are the most successful competitors in the event's history, with seven overall wins apiece.

Year	Rider	Motorcycle
2026	(Germany) Manuel Lettenbichler	KTM 300 EXC
2025	(Germany) Manuel Lettenbichler	KTM 300 EXC
2024	(Germany) Manuel Lettenbichler	KTM 300 EXC
2023	(Germany) Manuel Lettenbichler	KTM 300 EXC
2022	(United Kingdom) Graham Jarvis	Husqvarna TE 300
2021	(Germany) Manuel Lettenbichler	KTM 300 EXC
2020	(Germany) Manuel Lettenbichler	KTM 300 EXC
2019	(Germany) Manuel Lettenbichler	KTM 300 EXC
2018	(South Africa) Wade Young	Sherco 300 SE-R
2017	(United Kingdom) Graham Jarvis	Husqvarna TE 300
2016	(United Kingdom) Graham Jarvis	Husqvarna TE 300
2015	(United Kingdom) Jonny Walker	KTM 300 EXC
2014	(United Kingdom) Jonny Walker	KTM 300 EXC
2013	(United Kingdom) Graham Jarvis	Husaberg TE 300
2012	(United Kingdom) Graham Jarvis	Husaberg TE 300
2011	(United Kingdom) Graham Jarvis	Husaberg TE 300
2010	(New Zealand) Chris Birch	KTM
2009	(Germany) Andreas Lettenbichler	BMW G450 X
2008	(United Kingdom) Graham Jarvis	Sherco 450
2007	(France) Cyril Despres	KTM 300 EXC-E
2006	(France) Michel Gau	KTM
2005	(France) Cyril Despres	KTM
2004	(France) Cyril Despres	KTM

== Competitors and classes ==
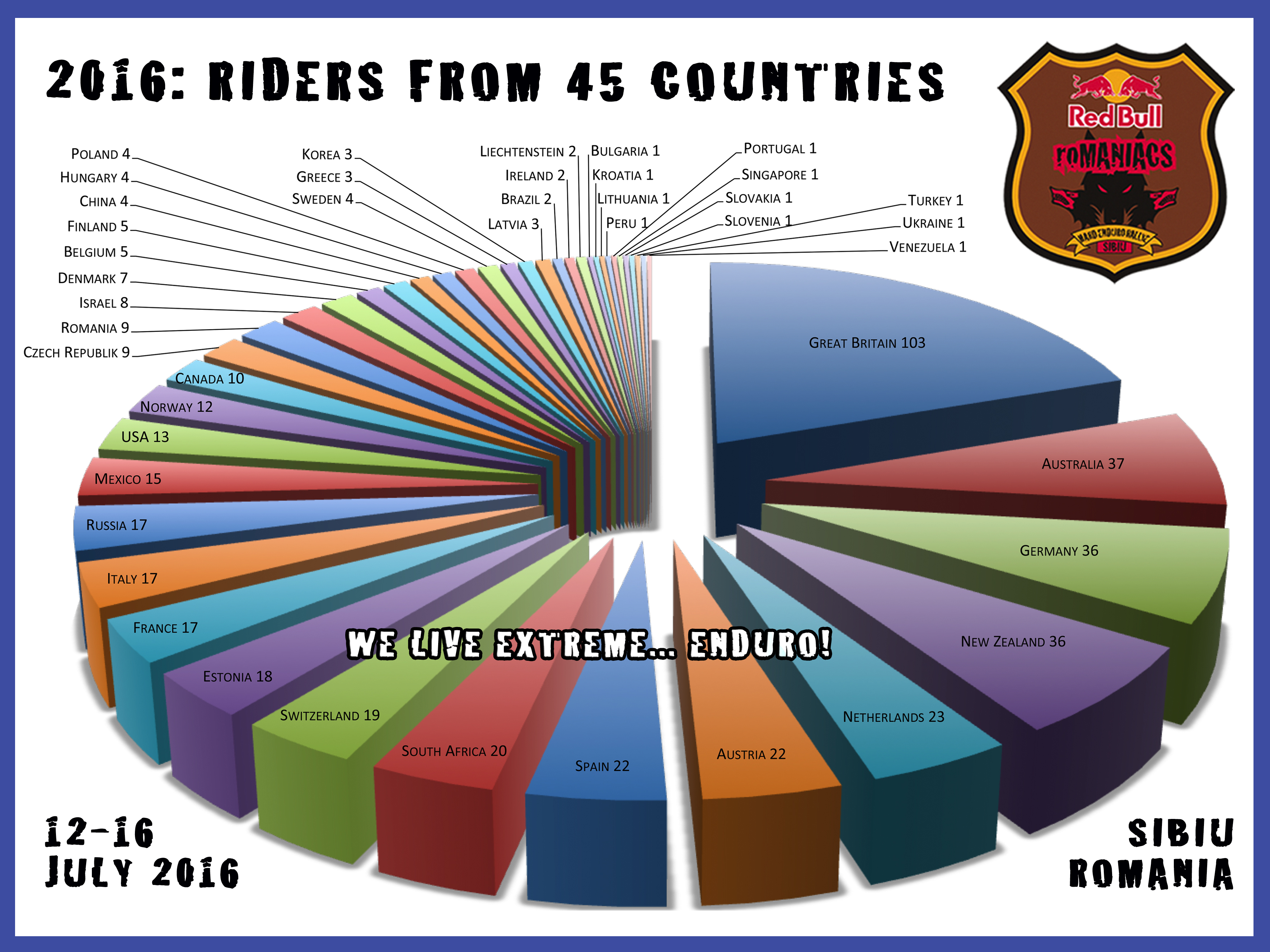
2016 participants by country

Competitors can participate in five different race classes: Atom, Iron, Bronze, Silver, and Gold, with Gold being the most challenging. Event registrations open in October for the following year's event, and the starting places for the Amateur race class are typically filled within days.

In the 22nd edition "Game Changer" in 2025, four new classes have been added: Adventure Ultimate & Lite, eMoto Expert & Hobby.

== Television coverage ==
The Romaniacs Hard Enduro Rallye has been broadcast in over 215 countries.
