= Wade Young =

Enduro motorcyclist

- Nationality: (South Africa) South African
- Born: 5 April 1996 (age 30); KwaZulu-Natal, South Africa
- Current team: Leader Tread
- Bike number: 55
- Website: https://www.55hardenduro.com

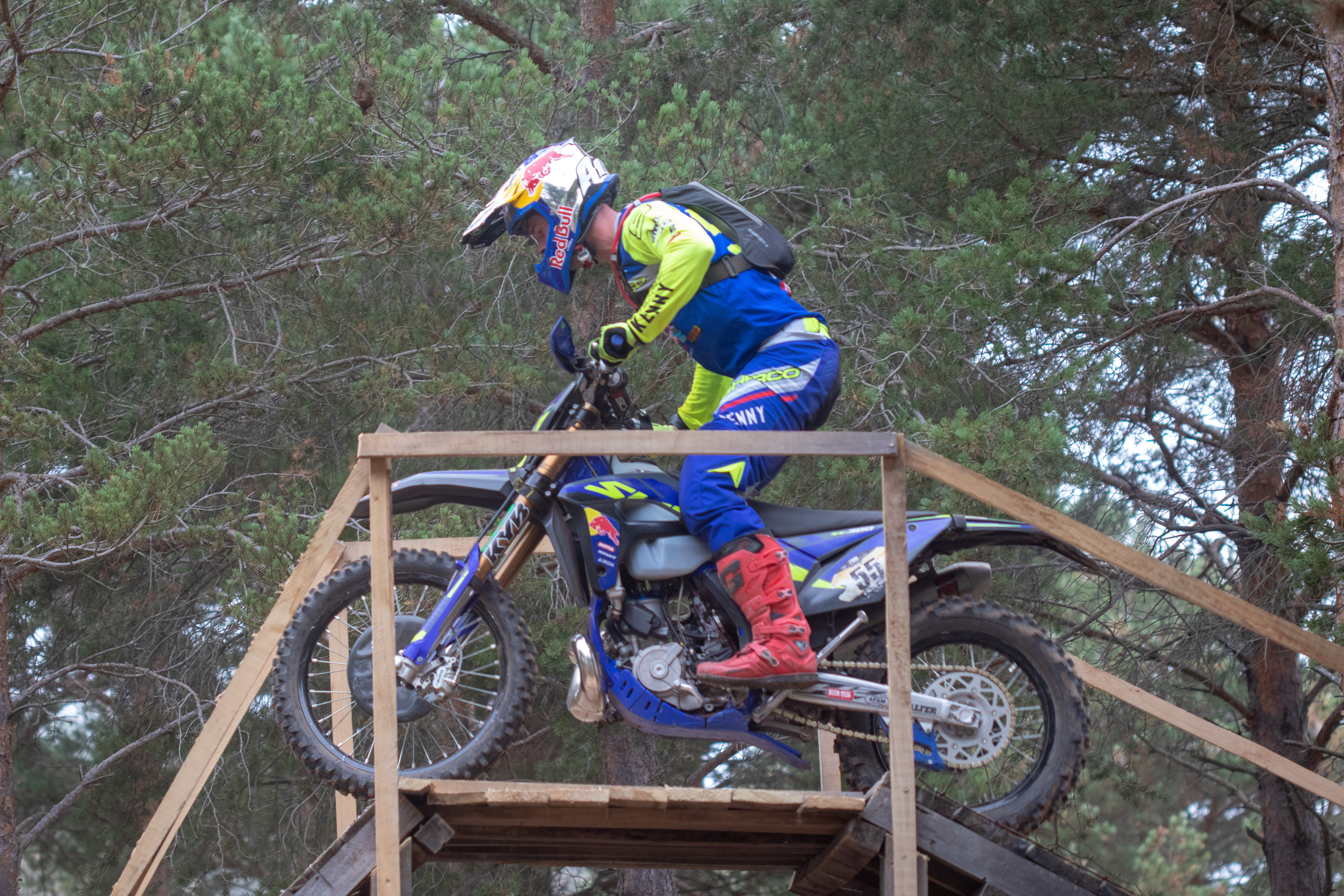
Wade Young in 2023

Wade Young (born 5 April 1996 in KwaZulu-Natal, South Africa) is an Extreme Enduro rider.

His achievements include winning Hell's Gate 2016 in Italy, King of the Hill 2017 in Romania, Roof of Africa 2017 in Lesotho, Extreme XL Lagares 2017 in Portugal, Wildwood Rock Extreme 2017 in Australia, Sea To Sky 2018 in Turkey, the Enduro de LicqAtherey 2018 in France, Red Bull Megawatt 2018 in Poland, Red Bull Romaniacs 2018 in Romania, and Machete Hard Enduro 2018 in the Dominican Republic.

Wade Young is a Factory Team Rider for Sherco.
