= 2013 NATC Motorcycle Trials season =

2013 NATC motorcycle trials season

Seasons
- ← 2012 2014 →

The 2013 NATC trials season was the 40th season. It consisted of ten trials events in three main classes: Pro, Expert and Women's Expert Sportsman. It began on 15 June, with round one in New York and ended with round ten in Minnesota on 25 August.

== Season summary ==
Patrick Smage would claim his fifth NATC Trials Championship in 2013.

== 2013 NATC trials season calendar ==
Round	Date	Trial	Venue	Pro class	Expert class	Women's ES
1	15 June	(New York (state)) New York	Cayuta	1) Patrick Smage; 2) Bryan Roper; 3) Logan Bolopue	1) Ray Peters; 2) Daniel Blanc-Gonnet; 3) Samuel Fastle	1) Caroline Allen; 2) Rachel Hassler
2	16 June	(New York (state)) New York	Cayuta	1) Patrick Smage; 2) Karl Davis Jr; 3) Bryan Roper	1) Alexander Niederer; 2) Ray Peters; 3) Daniel Blanc-Gonnet	1) Caroline Allen; 2) Rachel Hassler
3	22 June	Vermont	Highgate	1) Patrick Smage; 2) Bryan Roper; 3) Karl Davis Jr	1) Ray Peters; 2) Samuel Fastle; 3) Daniel Blanc-Gonnet	1) Caroline Allen; 2) Rachel Hassler
4	23 June	Vermont	Highgate	1) Patrick Smage; 2) Bryan Roper; 3) Logan Bolopue	1) Ray Peters; 2) Chase Harker; 3) Andrew Putt	1) Caroline Allen; 2) Rachel Hassler
5	27 July	Arizona	Kingman	1) Patrick Smage; 2) Bryan Roper; 3) Logan Bolopue	1) Ray Peters; 2) Nathan Hassler; 3) Samuel Fastle	1) Caroline Allen; 2) Rachel Hassler
6	28 July	Arizona	Kingman	1) Patrick Smage; 2) Bryan Roper; 3) Eric Storz	1) Ray Peters; 2) Nathan Hassler; 3) Samuel Fastle	1) Rachel Hassler; 2) Caroline Allen
7	3 August	New Mexico	Sipapu	1) Patrick Smage; 2) Logan Bolopue; 3) Bryan Roper	1) Ray Peters; 2) Samuel Fastle; 3) Nathan Hassler	1) Rachel Hassler; 2) Caroline Allen
8	4 August	New Mexico	Sipapu	1) Patrick Smage; 2) Bryan Roper; 3) Logan Bolopue	1) Ray Peters; 2) Andrew Putt; 3) Daniel Blanc-Gonnet	1) Caroline Allen; 2) Rachel Hassler
9	24 August	Minnesota	Duluth	1) Cody Webb; 2) Patrick Smage; 3) Bryan Roper	1) Ray Peters; 2) Daniel Blanc-Gonnet; 3) Andrew Putt	
10	25 August	Minnesota	Duluth	1) Patrick Smage; 2) Cody Webb; 3) Bryan Roper	1) Ray Peters; 2) Andrew Putt; 3) Quinn Wentzel	

=== Scoring system ===
Points were awarded to the top twenty finishers in each class. The best of nine rounds counted for the Pro class, and the best of six in Expert and Women's Expert Sportsman classes were counted.

Position	1st	2nd	3rd	4th	5th	6th	7th	8th	9th	10th	11th	12th	13th	14th	15th	16th	17th	18th	19th	20th
Points	30	25	21	18	16	15	14	13	12	11	10	9	8	7	6	5	4	3	2	1

=== NATC Pro final standings ===
Pos	Rider	Machine	NY (New York (state))	NY (New York (state))	VT (Vermont)	VT (Vermont)	AZ (Arizona)	AZ (Arizona)	NM (New Mexico)	NM (New Mexico)	MN (Minnesota)	MN (Minnesota)	Pts	Notes
1	(United States) Patrick Smage	Sherco	1	1	1	1	1	1	1	1	2	1	270 (295)	2012 NATC defending champion
2	(United States) Bryan Roper	Sherco	2	3	2	2	2	2	3	2	3	3	213 (234)	
3	(United States) Logan Bolopue	Sherco	3	4	4	3	3	4	2	3	4	4	181 (199)	
4	(United States) Eric Storz	Gas Gas	5	5	5	5	4	3	4	4	5	6	155 (170)	
5	(United States) Karl Davis Jr	Sherco	4	2	3	4	5	-	-	-	-	-	98	
6	(United States) Cody Webb	Beta	-	-	-	-	-	-	-	-	1	2	55	
7	(United States) Samuel Fastle	Sherco	-	-	-	-	-	-	-	5	6	5	47	2012 Expert 125 champion 2013 Ute Cup winner (RMTA)
8	(United States) Phil Smage	Sherco	-	-	-	-	-	-	-	-	-	7	29	
9	(United States) Daniel Blanc-Gonnet	Sherco	-	-	-	-	-	-	-	-	-	8	13	

=== NATC Expert final standings ===
Pos	Rider	Machine	NY (New York (state))	NY (New York (state))	VT (Vermont)	VT (Vermont)	AZ (Arizona)	AZ (Arizona)	NM (New Mexico)	NM (New Mexico)	MN (Minnesota)	MN (Minnesota)	Pts	Notes
1	(United States) Ray Peters	Beta	1	2	1	1	1	1	1	1	1	1	180 (295)	
2	(United States) Daniel Blanc-Gonnet	Sherco	2	3	3	8	5	4	6	3	2	-	131 (175)	
3	(United States) Samuel Fastle	Sherco	3	4	2	6	3	3	2	-	-	-	131 (146)	2012 Expert 125 champion
4	(United States) Andrew Putt	Sherco	4	5	6	3	4	5	4	2	3	2	129 (193)	2012 Junior champion
5	(United States) Nathan Hassler	Gas Gas	9	9	5	9	2	2	3	5	-	-	115 (139)	
6	(United States) Quinn Wentzel	Sherco	6	8	9	5	6	6	5	4	4	3	104 (159)	2012 High School champion
7	(Austria) Alexander Niederer	Beta	5	1	7	7	-	-	-	-	-	-	74	
8	(United States) Chase Harker	Sherco	7	6	4	2	-	-	-	-	-	-	72	
9	(United States) Jerome Gregorowicz	Beta	8	12	8	4	-	-	-	-	-	-	53	
10	(United States) Cody Bradon	Gas Gas	11	10	11	11	-	-	-	-	-	-	41	
11	(United States) Drew Fortner	Beta	12	13	10	10	-	-	-	-	-	-	39	
12	(United States) Keifer Jacobson	Gas Gas	-	-	-	-	7	7	-	-	-	-	28	
13	(Mexico) David Garza Perez	Gas Gas	-	-	-	-	-	-	7	7	-	-	28	
14	(United States) Ty Cullins	Beta	-	-	-	-	-	-	8	6	-	-	28	
15	(United States) Nick Fonzi	Beta	10	11	-	-	-	-	-	-	-	-	21	
16	(United States) Travis Fox	Gas Gas	-	7	-	-	-	-	-	-	-	-	14	

=== NATC Women's Expert Sportsman final standings ===
Pos	Rider	Machine	NY (New York (state))	NY (New York (state))	VT (Vermont)	VT (Vermont)	AZ (Arizona)	AZ (Arizona)	NM (New Mexico)	NM (New Mexico)	MN (Minnesota)	MN (Minnesota)	Pts	Notes
1	(United States) Caroline Allen	Gas Gas	1	1	1	1	1	2	2	1	-	-	180 (230)	
2	(United States) Rachel Hassler	Gas Gas	2	2	2	2	2	1	1	2	-	-	160 (210)	2012 Women's champion
