= 2017 NATC Motorcycle Trials season =

The 2017 NATC trials season was the 44th season. It consisted of eight trials events in three main classes: Pro, Expert and Women's Pro. It began on 2 April, with round one in Texas and ended with round eight in Rhode Island on 25 June.

== Season summary ==
Patrick Smage would claim his ninth NATC Trials Championship in 2017.

== 2017 NATC trials season calendar ==
Round	Date	Trial	Venue	Pro class	Expert class	Women's Pro
1	1 April	Texas	Amarillo	1) Marc Freixa; 2) Patrick Smage; 3) Andrew Putt	1) Olivier Clamagirand; 2) Alexander Myers; 3) Jerome Gregorowicz	1) Madeleine Hoover; 2) Christy Williams; 3) Kylee Sweeten
2	2 April	Texas	Amarillo	1) Patrick Smage; 2) Andrew Putt; 3) Marc Freixa	1) Alexander Myers; 2) Josh Roper; 3) Drew Fortner	1) Madeleine Hoover; 2) Christy Williams; 3) Kylee Sweeten
3	8 April	Kansas	Sedan	1) Patrick Smage; 2) Marc Freixa; 3) Bryan Roper	1) Josh Roper; 2) Alexander Myers; 3) Drew Fortner	1) Madeleine Hoover; 2) Christy Williams; 3) Kylee Sweeten
4	9 April	Kansas	Sedan	1) Patrick Smage; 2) Marc Freixa; 3) Andrew Putt	1) Andreas Niederer; 2) Ty Cullins; 3) Aaron Thistle	1) Madeleine Hoover; 2) Christy Williams; 3) Kylee Sweeten
5	17 June	Ohio	Cleveland	1) Marc Freixa; 2) Patrick Smage; 3) Andrew Putt	1) Drew Fortner; 2) Andreas Niederer; 3) Alexander Myers	1) Madeleine Hoover; 2) Kylee Sweeten; 3) Christy Williams
6	18 June	Ohio	Cleveland	1) Patrick Smage; 2) Marc Freixa; 3) Andrew Putt	1) Alexander Myers; 2) Andreas Niederer; 3) Jerome Gregorowicz	1) Madeleine Hoover; 2) Kylee Sweeten; 3) Christy Williams
7	24 June	Rhode Island	Exeter	1) Patrick Smage; 2) Marc Freixa; 3) Andrew Putt	1) Drew Fortner; 2) Josh Roper; 3) Andreas Neiderer	1) Christy Williams; 2) Madeleine Hoover; 3) Kylee Sweeten
8	25 June	Rhode Island	Exeter	1) Marc Freixa; 2) Patrick Smage; 3) Andrew Putt	1) Andreas Niederer; 2) Drew Fortner; 3) Alexander Myers	1) Madeleine Hoover; 2) Christy Williams; 3) Kylee Sweeten

=== Scoring system ===
Points were awarded to the top twenty finishers in each class. All eight rounds counted for the Pro class, and the best of seven in Expert and Women's Pro classes were counted.

Position	1st	2nd	3rd	4th	5th	6th	7th	8th	9th	10th	11th	12th	13th	14th	15th	16th	17th	18th	19th	20th
Points	30	25	21	18	16	15	14	13	12	11	10	9	8	7	6	5	4	3	2	1

=== NATC Pro final standings ===
Pos	Rider	Machine	TX (Texas)	TX (Texas)	KS (Kansas)	KS (Kansas)	OH (Ohio)	OH (Ohio)	RI (Rhode Island)	RI (Rhode Island)	Pts	Notes
1	(United States) Patrick Smage	Sherco	2	1	1	1	2	1	1	2	225	
2	(Spain) Marc Freixa	Montesa	1	3	2	2	1	2	2	1	211	2016 NATC Champion
3	(United States) Andrew Putt	Sherco	3	2	4	3	3	3	3	3	169	
4	(United States) Bryan Roper	Gas Gas	4	4	3	4	4	4	4	4	147	
5	(Austria) Alexander Niederer	Gas Gas	6	5	6	7	5	6	5	5	123	
6	(United States) Daniel Blanc-Gonnet	Montesa	5	6	7	6	6	5	6	6	121	
7	(United States) Samuel Fastle	Sherco	8	7	8	8	7	7	7	7	109	
8	(United States) Quinn Wentzel	Scorpa	9	9	9	9	8	8	8	8	100	
9	(United States) Karl Davis Jr	Scorpa	7	8	5	5	-	-	-	-	59	

=== NATC Expert final standings ===
Pos	Rider	Machine	TX (Texas)	TX (Texas)	KS (Kansas)	KS (Kansas)	OH (Ohio)	OH (Ohio)	RI (Rhode Island)	RI (Rhode Island)	Pts	Notes
1	(United States) Alexander Myers	Scorpa	2	1	2	6	3	1	4	3	95 (170)	
2	(Austria) Andreas Niederer	Beta	5	5	4	1	2	2	3	1	80 (165)	2016 Expert Champion
3	(United States) Drew Fortner	Gas Gas	4	3	3	4	1	4	1	2	78 (163)	
4	(United States) Josh Roper	Sherco	7	2	1	5	4	5	2	4	85 (148)	
5	(United States) Jerome Gregorowicz	Gas Gas	3	9	7	7	5	3	6	6	61 (116)	
6	(United States) Luke Littlefield	Sherco	10	10	10	10	12	10	11	-	44 (74)	
7	(United States) Aaron Thistle	Sherco	8	6	6	3	-	-	-	-	64	
8	(United States) Alan Shirley	Gas Gas	-	-	9	11	10	12	12	11	61	
9	(United States) Andres Sandrock	Sherco	6	4	8	8	-	-	-	-	59	
10	(United States) Jose Rivas Sr	Gas Gas	9	8	5	9	-	-	-	-	53	
11	(Canada) Brian Wojnarowski	Sherco	-	-	-	-	6	8	10	9	51	
12	(United States) Cody Bradon	Gas Gas	-	-	-	-	7	9	8	10	50	
13	(United States) Chris Spoonagle	Sherco	-	-	-	-	8	7	9	12	48	2016 Sportsman East Champion
14	(Belgium) Olivier Clamagirand	Montesa	1	7	-	-	-	-	-	-	44	
15	(United States) Micah Hertrich	Gas Gas	-	-	-	-	-	6	7	8	42	2016 Expert 125 Champion
16	(United States) Skyler Busswood	Beta	-	-	-	-	9	11	13	13	38	
17	(Canada) Jonathan English	Beta	-	-	-	-	-	-	5	7	30	2017 Canadian Champion
18	(United States) Ty Cullins	Beta	-	-	-	2	-	-	-	-	25	
19	(United States) Travis Fox	Gas Gas	-	-	-	-	-	-	-	5	16	
20	(United States) Aaron Komer	Scorpa	-	-	-	-	11	-	-	-	10	

=== NATC Women's Pro final standings ===
Pos	Rider	Machine	TX (Texas)	TX (Texas)	KS (Kansas)	KS (Kansas)	OH (Ohio)	OH (Ohio)	RI (Rhode Island)	RI (Rhode Island)	Pts	Notes
1	(United States) Madeleine Hoover	Gas Gas	1	1	1	1	1	1	2	1	210 (235)	
2	(Canada) Christy Williams	Montesa	2	2	2	2	3	3	1	2	176 (197)	2016 Women's Expert Champion
3	(United States) Kylee Sweeten	Sherco	3	3	3	3	2	2	3	3	155 (176)	
