= 2026 FIM Enduro World Championship =

2026 world enduro championship season

The 2026 World Enduro Championship was the 37th season of the FIM World Enduro Championship. The season consisted of seven events.

Josep García went into the championship after winning both the EnduroGP and Enduro 1 classes in 2025. He was able to successfully defend both titles, going unbeaten in the Enduro 1 category along the way.

Andrea Verona was the reigning Enduro 2 champion, whilst Hamish MacDonald went into the season after taking the Enduro 3 title in 2025. Verona successfully defended his Enduro 2 title, whilst Steve Holcombe won the Enduro 3 title in a season where he returned from the injury problems which troubled him in 2025.

== Calendar ==
A seven-round calendar was announced in September 2025.

Round	Event	Location	Dates
1	Italy	Custonaci	10–12 April
2	Spain	Oliana	1–3 May
3	Finland	Vierumäki	22–24 May
4	Portugal	Fafe	12–14 June
5	Portugal	Fafe	19–21 June
6	France	Saint-Agrève	17–19 July
7	United Kingdom	Rhayader	7–9 August

== EnduroGP ==
=== Participants ===
Enduro 1 Riders
Team	Constructor	No	Rider	Rounds
Triumph Racing Factory Team	Triumph	6	(Germany) Jeremy Sydow	2–7
Triumph Racing Factory Team	Triumph	118	(United Kingdom) Jack Edmondson	1–2
PAR Homes Enduro Team	KTM	118	(United Kingdom) Jack Edmondson	7
Moto RS Team	Sherco	10	(Italy) Davide Soreca	1
KR69 World Enduro Team	Husqvarna	19	(Finland) Roni Kytönen	1–5, 7
KR69 World Enduro Team	Husqvarna	54	(Sweden) Axel Semb	All
Honda Racing Redmoto Enduro	Honda	23	(Italy) Samuele Bernardini	1–4, 6–7
Red Bull KTM Factory Racing	KTM	26	(Spain) Josep García	All
NSA Racing Team	Husqvarna	38	(Italy) Manolo Morettini	All
Triumph Italia Racing	Triumph	41	(Italy) Morgan Lesiardo	All
Johansson MPE	Triumph	53	(Finland) Samuli Puhakainen	1–5
Johansson MPE	Triumph	211	(Australia) Seton Broomhall	6–7
Johansson MPE	Triumph	242	(United States) Josh Mosiman	7
WP Eric Augé	KTM	67	(Spain) Yago Martínez	1–3, 6–7
Team Sherco Factory	Sherco	71	(Belgium) Antoine Magain	All
Yamaha Offroad Experience	Yamaha	160	(United Kingdom) Aaron Gordon	2, 6–7
	KTM	240	(United Kingdom) Alfie Webb	7
3G Factory Team	KTM	249	(Italy) Federico Trabucco	6
Snellman Motosport	Beta	298	(Finland) Peetu Juupaluoma	3
Enduro 2 Riders
Team	Constructor	No	Rider	Rounds
MGR Enduro Kawasaki	Kawasaki	11	(Australia) Kyron Bacon	All
Triumph Racing Factory Team	Triumph	16	(United Kingdom) Harry Edmondson	7
Triumph Racing Factory Team	Triumph	22	(United Kingdom) Jonny Walker	7
Honda Racing Redmoto Enduro	Honda	22	(Italy) Thomas Oldrati	1
Honda Racing Redmoto Enduro	Honda	151	(Sweden) Max Ahlin	All
TM Moto Boano Factory Enduro Team	TM	25	(Italy) Matteo Cavallo	7
TM Moto Boano Factory Enduro Team	TM	101	(France) Zach Pichon	All
PAR Homes Enduro Team	KTM	75	(United Kingdom) Dan Mundell	7
Team Sherco Factory	Sherco	76	(New Zealand) Hamish MacDonald	All
	TM	82	(Finland) Väinö Santamäki	3
Beta Factory Enduro Team	Beta	91	(United Kingdom) Nathan Watson	All
Red Bull KTM Factory Racing	KTM	99	(Italy) Andrea Verona	All
Stark Oxmoto EnduroGP	Stark	103	(France) David Herbreteau	All
KBS Team	Honda	123	(Czech Republic) Kryštof Kouble	All
WP Eric Augé	Husqvarna	195	(Sweden) Albin Elowson	All
Johansson MPE	Triumph	205	(Sweden) Oskar Ljungström	3
	Yamaha	208	(Italy) Andrea Amato	1
Rocky Mountain Red Bear Kawasaki	Kawasaki	214	(United States) Steward Baylor	4
KouMet/KLservice/Kawasaki Suomi	Kawasaki	232	(Finland) Ville Meisola	3
Kaivolainen Racing	KTM	247	(Finland) Joni Kaivolainen	3
Fantic Motor Suomi/RasmiraRaceShop	Fantic	259	(Finland) Antti Hänninen	3
Esprit Moto/TM Racing France	TM	264	(France) Anthony Geslin	6
Kytönen Motorsport	Husqvarna	296	(Finland) Roni Salin	3
Dafy Enduro Team	KTM	298	(France) Léo Le Quéré	2, 6
Enduro 3 Riders
Team	Constructor	No	Rider	Rounds
Stark Oxmoto EnduroGP	Stark	2	(Spain) Marc Sans	All
Beta Factory Enduro Team	Beta	12	(United Kingdom) Brad Freeman	All
Fantic Factory Racing Enduro Team Specia	Fantic	17	(France) Theo Espinasse	All
TM Moto Boano Factory Enduro Team	TM	25	(Italy) Matteo Cavallo	1–6
Lunigiana Enduro Team	Sherco	27	(United Kingdom) Charlie Chater	1–3, 6–7
Seventy Group	Beta	36	(Norway) Herman Ask	1
Motofit Racing	Sherco	47	(United Kingdom) Jed Etchells	All
Team Sherco Factory	Sherco	51	(France) Julien Roussaly	All
Team Sherco Factory	Sherco	70	(United Kingdom) Steve Holcombe	All
Husqvarna Factory Racing	Husqvarna	57	(United Kingdom) Billy Bolt	7
Sherco Deutschland	Sherco	62	(Germany) Luca Fischeder	3, 6
	Sherco	82	(Finland) Väinö Santamäki	1–2
NSA Racing Team	Husqvarna	97	(Sweden) Albin Norrbin	All
TM powered by PAR Homes	TM	191	(United Kingdom) Alex Walton	1–4, 6–7

=== Riders Championship ===
Pos	Rider	Bike	Class	ITA (Italy)		ESP (Spain)		FIN (Finland)		POR (Portugal)		POR (Portugal)		FRA (France)		GBR (United Kingdom)		Points
1	(Spain) Josep García	KTM	Enduro 1	1	3	1	1	2	1	1	2	1	1	2	1	1	1	266
2	(Italy) Andrea Verona	KTM	Enduro 2	3	2	3	2	1	2	3	5	2	5	3	6	5	2	208
3	(France) Zach Pichon	TM	Enduro 2	6	9	4	3	3	5	2	1	3	3	1	2	2	3	207
4	(United Kingdom) Steve Holcombe	Sherco	Enduro 3	2	5	Ret	5	4	3	Ret	3	4	4	4	3	4	11	154
5	(New Zealand) Hamish MacDonald	Sherco	Enduro 2	10	15	2	6	5	9	4	6	5	2	6	5	8	14	134
6	(United Kingdom) Brad Freeman	Beta	Enduro 3	13	1	7	8	10	4	11	4	8	7	7	4	11	6	131
7	(Italy) Morgan Lesiardo	Triumph	Enduro 1	7	6	16	10	8	6	6	12	10	9	11	12	6	5	100
8	(Sweden) Max Ahlin	Honda	Enduro 2	9	11	10	9	7	12	8	10	9	12	9	8	9	7	94
9	(Sweden) Albin Norrbin	Husqvarna	Enduro 3	11	10	13	4	6	8	9	8	7	6	14	13	13	10	93
10	(France) Julien Roussaly	Sherco	Enduro 3	14	12	9	11	11	10	7	9	6	10	5	7	12	8	93
11	(United Kingdom) Nathan Watson	Beta	Enduro 2	8	7	14	16	14	13	12	13	15	14	10	14	3	4	70
12	(Germany) Jeremy Sydow	Triumph	Enduro 1			15	19	Ret	7	10	7	12	11	8	9	10	9	62
13	(Belgium) Antoine Magain	Sherco	Enduro 1	4	4	8	15	9	11	13	14	Ret	13	12	17	18	19	59
13	(France) Theo Espinasse	Fantic	Enduro 3	5	8	17	14	17	22	5	11	Ret	17	13	10	7	Ret	55
15	(Australia) Kyron Bacon	Kawasaki	Enduro 2	27	22	11	7	12	Ret	Ret	19	11	8	15	11	15	13	41
16	(Sweden) Axel Semb	Husqvarna	Enduro 1	17	14	6	13	20	21	21	16	14	16	17	26	14	12	23
17	(Italy) Matteo Cavallo	TM	Enduro 3	12	13	12	12	13	20	15	17	13	20	18	20			22
17	(Italy) Matteo Cavallo	TM	Enduro 2													33	29	22
18	(Italy) Samuele Bernardini	Honda	Enduro 1	15	19	5	Ret	15	15	Ret	24			19	21	22	22	14
19	(Sweden) Albin Elowson	Husqvarna	Enduro 2	18	16	Ret	20	16	19	14	18	17	15	Ret	15	20	15	5
20	(Finland) Roni Kytönen	Husqvarna	Enduro 1	19	23	18	18	18	14	19	Ret	Ret	DNS			23	Ret	2
21	(United States) Steward Baylor	Kawasaki	Enduro 2							16	15							1
Pos	Rider	Bike	Class	ITA (Italy)		ESP (Spain)		FIN (Finland)		POR (Portugal)		POR (Portugal)		FRA (France)		GBR (United Kingdom)		Points

=== Enduro 1 ===
Enduro 1 is for motorcycles up to and including 250cc, both 2-stroke and 4-stroke.

Pos	Rider	Bike	ITA (Italy)		ESP (Spain)		FIN (Finland)		POR (Portugal)		POR (Portugal)		FRA (France)		GBR (United Kingdom)		Points
1	(Spain) Josep García	KTM	1	1	1	1	1	1	1	1	1	1	1	1	1	1	280
2	(Italy) Morgan Lesiardo	Triumph	3	3	6	2	2	2	2	3	2	2	3	3	2	2	221
3	(Belgium) Antoine Magain	Sherco	2	2	4	4	3	4	4	4	Ret	4	4	4	6	6	173
4	(Germany) Jeremy Sydow	Triumph			5	6	Ret	3	3	2	3	3	2	2	3	3	162
5	(Sweden) Axel Semb	Husqvarna	6	4	3	3	6	7	7	5	4	5	5	7	4	4	162
6	(Italy) Manolo Morettini	Husqvarna	9	10	8	7	7	10	6	6	5	6	7	5	9	7	122
7	(Italy) Samuele Bernardini	Honda	4	6	2	Ret	4	6	Ret	7			6	6	7	8	109
8	(Finland) Roni Kytönen	Husqvarna	7	7	7	5	5	5	5	Ret	Ret	DNS			8	Ret	79
9	(Spain) Yago Martínez	KTM	5	5	9	10	9	8					10	10	10	11	73
10	(Finland) Samuli Puhakainen	Triumph	11	11	11	9	10	11	8	8	6	7					68
11	(United Kingdom) Jack Edmondson	Triumph	8	8	10	8											52
11	(United Kingdom) Jack Edmondson	KTM													5	5	52
12	(United Kingdom) Aaron Gordon	Yamaha			12	11							8	8	11	9	37
13	(Finland) Peetu Juupaluoma	Beta					8	9									15
14	(Australia) Seton Broomhall	Triumph											11	11	14	13	15
15	(Italy) Federico Trabucco	KTM											9	9			14
16	(Italy) Davide Soreca	Sherco	10	9													13
17	(United Kingdom) Alfie Webb	KTM													12	10	10
18	(United States) Josh Mosiman	Triumph													13	12	7
Pos	Rider	Bike	ITA (Italy)		ESP (Spain)		FIN (Finland)		POR (Portugal)		POR (Portugal)		FRA (France)		GBR (United Kingdom)		Points

=== Enduro 2 ===
Enduro 2 is for 4-stroke motorcycles from 255cc-450cc.

Pos	Rider	Bike	ITA (Italy)		ESP (Spain)		FIN (Finland)		POR (Portugal)		POR (Portugal)		FRA (France)		GBR (United Kingdom)		Points
1	(Italy) Andrea Verona	KTM	1	1	2	1	1	1	2	2	1	3	2	3	3	1	253
2	(France) Zach Pichon	TM	2	3	3	2	2	2	1	1	2	2	1	1	1	2	249
3	(New Zealand) Hamish MacDonald	Sherco	5	5	1	3	3	3	3	3	3	1	3	2	4	6	207
4	(Sweden) Max Ahlin	Honda	4	4	4	5	4	4	4	4	4	5	4	4	5	4	176
5	(United Kingdom) Nathan Watson	Beta	3	2	6	6	6	5	5	5	6	6	5	6	2	3	168
6	(Australia) Kyron Bacon	Kawasaki	9	9	5	4	5	Ret	Ret	8	5	4	6	5	6	5	123
7	(Sweden) Albin Elowson	Husqvarna	6	6	Ret	7	7	7	6	7	8	7	Ret	7	8	7	109
8	(Czech Republic) Kryštof Kouble	Honda	7	7	8	8	8	6	8	9	7	8	8	9	Ret	DNS	99
9	(France) David Herbreteau	Stark	10	10	9	10	13	12	9	DNS	Ret	9	10	11	11	12	66
10	(France) Léo Le Quéré	KTM			7	9							7	8			33
11	(United States) Steward Baylor	Kawasaki							7	6							19
12	(United Kingdom) Jonny Walker	Triumph													7	8	17
13	(Italy) Thomas Oldrati	Honda	8	8													16
14	(Sweden) Oskar Ljungström	Triumph					10	8									14
15	(United Kingdom) Harry Edmondson	Triumph													9	9	14
16	(Finland) Antti Hänninen	Fantic					9	9									14
17	(France) Anthony Geslin	TM											9	10			13
18	(United Kingdom) Dan Mundell	KTM													10	10	12
19	(Finland) Ville Meisola	Kawasaki					11	10									11
20	(Italy) Andrea Amato	Yamaha	11	11													10
21	(Italy) Matteo Cavallo	TM													12	11	9
22	(Finland) Roni Salin	Husqvarna					12	11									9
	(Finland) Väinö Santamäki	TM					14	13									0
	(Finland) Joni Kaivolainen	KTM					Ret	DNS									0
Pos	Rider	Bike	ITA (Italy)		ESP (Spain)		FIN (Finland)		POR (Portugal)		POR (Portugal)		FRA (France)		GBR (United Kingdom)		Points

=== Enduro 3 ===
Enduro 3 is for 2-stroke motorcycles over 255cc and 4-stroke motorcycles over 455cc.

Pos	Rider	Bike	ITA (Italy)		ESP (Spain)		FIN (Finland)		POR (Portugal)		POR (Portugal)		FRA (France)		GBR (United Kingdom)		Points
1	(United Kingdom) Steve Holcombe	Sherco	1	2	Ret	2	1	1	Ret	1	1	1	1	1	1	4	227
2	(United Kingdom) Brad Freeman	Beta	5	1	1	3	3	2	4	2	4	3	3	2	3	1	223
3	(Sweden) Albin Norrbin	Husqvarna	3	4	4	1	2	3	3	3	3	2	5	5	5	3	203
4	(France) Julien Roussaly	Sherco	6	5	2	4	4	4	2	4	2	4	2	3	4	2	199
5	(France) Theo Espinasse	Fantic	2	3	5	6	6	8	1	5	Ret	5	4	4	2	Ret	156
6	(Italy) Matteo Cavallo	TM	4	6	3	5	5	7	5	6	5	7	6	6			130
7	(United Kingdom) Jed Etchells	Sherco	8	9	7	8	7	5	6	7	7	6	8	7	6	6	127
8	(Spain) Marc Sans	Stark	9	8	6	7	10	9	7	8	6	8	9	8	8	5	116
9	(United Kingdom) Alex Walton	TM	7	7	8	Ret	8	10	8	Ret			7	Ret	7	Ret	66
10	(United Kingdom) Charlie Chater	Sherco	10	11	9	9	11	11					10	Ret	10	8	55
11	(Germany) Luca Fischeder	Sherco					9	6					Ret	9			24
12	(Finland) Väinö Santamäki	Sherco	12	12	10	10											20
13	(United Kingdom) Billy Bolt	Husqvarna													9	7	16
14	(Norway) Herman Ask	Beta	11	10													11
Pos	Rider	Bike	ITA (Italy)		ESP (Spain)		FIN (Finland)		POR (Portugal)		POR (Portugal)		FRA (France)		GBR (United Kingdom)		Points

== Junior ==
All riders competing in the Junior world championships must be younger than 23 years of age on 1 January of the year of the championship.

=== Participants ===
Junior 1 Riders
Team	Constructor	No	Rider	Rounds
Rieju Factory Team	Rieju	7	(Spain) Liam Sanjuan	1–2, 4–7
Hot1 Racing	Yamaha	14	(Finland) Tiitus Enjala	1–2
Instatech Racing Team	Triumph	20	(Sweden) Robin Gunnarsson	3–6
TM Moto Boano Factory Enduro Team	TM	32	(Italy) Alberto Elgari	All
Atomic Moto	Beta	33	(France) Clement Clauzier	All
Atomic Moto	Beta	92	(France) Dorian Simon	3–6
Beta UK/John Lee Motorcycles	Beta	35	(United Kingdom) Callum Hughes	All
Motofit Racing	Sherco	56	(New Zealand) Dylan Huddleston	4–5
Motofit Racing	Sherco	58	(United Kingdom) Robert Moyer	2–3
Motofit Racing	Sherco	73	(United Kingdom) Roan Delaney	1–2, 4–7
Beta Trueba	Beta	60	(Spain) Nil Rojas	2–4, 6–7
Honda Racing Redmoto Enduro	Honda	61	(Italy) Valentino Corsi	All
Honda Racing Redmoto Enduro	Honda	128	(France) Marc-Antoine Rossi	1
Triumph Italia Racing	Triumph	63	(Italy) Luca Colorio	All
Triumph Italia Racing	Triumph	78	(Hungary) Roland Liszka	All
Triumph Italia Racing	Triumph	145	(Portugal) Francisco Leite	All
Johansson MPE	Triumph	65	(Sweden) Arvid Modin	All
Sherco Academy France	Sherco	72	(Belgium) Hugo Vukcevic	1–2, 4–7
RFME Spain National Team	Sherco	77	(Spain) Aleix Saumell	1–2, 6–7
Entrophy Enduro Team	Beta	80	(Italy) Davide Mei	All
Esprit Moto/TM Racing France	TM	93	(France) Matteo Arrieta	6
Beta Motorcycles Scandinavia	Beta	94	(Sweden) Edvin Wiberg	1
Triumph Racing Factory Team	Triumph	96	(France) Leo Joyon	All
	TM	102	(Italy) Samuli Boano	1–3, 6
Enduro Engineering Race Team	Triumph	115	(United States) Chase Bright	4
Triple D Motosport	KTM	124	(United Kingdom) Will Barnett	6–7
Fantic Factory Racing Enduro Team Specia	Fantic	150	(Mexico) Miguel Ruiz de Chavez	1–5
Motopalvelu/KTM Nordic	KTM	206	(Finland) Jonni Hujala	3
KTM Scandinavia	KTM	222	(Sweden) Kalle Ahlin	3
KTM Scandinavia	KTM	245	(Sweden) Sebastian Olsen	3
WP Eric Augé	KTM	223	(Mexico) Alberto González	All
WP Eric Augé	KTM	230	(Colombia) Martín Chica	6
Junior 2 Riders
Team	Constructor	No	Rider	Rounds
WP Eric Augé	KTM	4	(Spain) Alex Puey	All
WP Eric Augé	KTM	28	(Spain) Albert Fontova	All
WP Eric Augé	KTM	59	(Spain) Lluis Gonfaus	2–4
WP Eric Augé	KTM	126	(United Kingdom) Samuel Hughes	1–5
Fast Eddy Racing	Triumph	9	(United Kingdom) Jack Keenan	All
Hot1 Racing	Yamaha	14	(Finland) Tiitus Enjala	3
NSA Racing Team	Husqvarna	34	(Italy) Kevin Cristino	All
Motofit Racing	Sherco	37	(United Kingdom) Kit Szabo	All
Team KTM Pro Racing	KTM	44	(France) Romain Dagna	All
TM powered by PAR Homes	TM	55	(United Kingdom) Sion Evans	1–2
Atomic Moto	Beta	64	(France) Diego Haution	All
Atomic Moto	Beta	66	(France) Maxime Clauzier	1–5, 7
D-Vision Moto powered by FP-Engineering	TM	89	(Germany) Gary Dittmann	6
TM Moto Boano Factory Enduro Team	TM	90	(Italy) Manuel Verzeroli	All
KBS Team	Sherco	100	(Czech Republic) Jaroslav Kalný	All
Fantic Factory Racing Enduro Team Specia	Fantic	105	(France) Thibault Giraudon	All
Husqvarna Motorcycles Scandinavia	Husqvarna	110	(Sweden) Alfons Lindström	All
Triumph Berlin	Triumph	127	(Germany) Leon Thoms	All
SJP Moto/TM UK	TM	137	(United Kingdom) Jacob Potts	All
Entrophy Enduro Team	Beta	152	(Czech Republic) Matěj Škuta	1–6
Momento TT/KTM Portugal	KTM	155	(Portugal) Rúben Ferreira	1–3
Johansson MPE	Triumph	196	(Australia) William Dennett	1–5, 7
Kytönen Motorsport	Husqvarna	197	(Finland) Niko Puotsaari	2–3, 6
Team Elite Factory Honda Motul	Honda	225	(France) Antonin Mille	2, 6
Team Motopalvelu	KTM	226	(Finland) Albert Juhola	3
Triple D Motosport	KTM	244	(United Kingdom) Burts Crayston	7
Snellman Motosport	Beta	284	(Finland) Juho Ahokas	3

=== Riders Championship ===
Pos	Rider	Bike	Class	ITA (Italy)		ESP (Spain)		FIN (Finland)		POR (Portugal)		POR (Portugal)		FRA (France)		GBR (United Kingdom)		Points
1	(Italy) Alberto Elgari	TM	Junior 1	1	1	3	1	5	3	1	6	3	1	3	1	2	5	229
2	(France) Leo Joyon	Triumph	Junior 1	7	3	5	3	4	7	2	1	1	2	2	2	1	1	220
3	(France) Romain Dagna	KTM	Junior 2	2	2	1	2	1	4	6	7	2	5	4	5	4	10	194
4	(Italy) Kevin Cristino	Husqvarna	Junior 2	4	7	2	6	2	1	5	2	4	4	7	6	8	2	184
5	(France) Thibault Giraudon	Fantic	Junior 2	5	4	6	37	3	5	3	4	10	3	1	3	5	6	165
6	(Italy) Manuel Verzeroli	TM	Junior 2	Ret	6	7	8	9	6	7	3	7	6	6	4	3	3	140
7	(Australia) William Dennett	Triumph	Junior 2	6	13	9	4	21	2	4	5	6	8			6	4	115
8	(Spain) Alex Puey	KTM	Junior 2	11	11	4	10	8	15	9	8	5	11	5	20	7	12	93
9	(France) Clement Clauzier	Beta	Junior 1	8	5	10	14	6	9	13	12	8	9	8	8	14	11	89
10	(Italy) Luca Colorio	Triumph	Junior 1	10	9	12	7	14	10	8	13	9	13	13	10	15	13	68
11	(Italy) Valentino Corsi	Honda	Junior 2	9	8	8	9	23	13	14	9	16	10	14	12	12	7	67
12	(France) Maxime Clauzier	Beta	Junior 2	3	10	13	15	Ret	12	10	10	12	7			11	Ret	59
13	(Hungary) Roland Liszka	Triumph	Junior 1	12	16	17	20	10	14	11	14	11	Ret	10	7	9	8	54
14	(France) Diego Haution	Beta	Junior 2	22	14	11	5	15	8	28	19	19	16	9	11	16	9	46
15	(Czech Republic) Jaroslav Kalný	Sherco	Junior 2	17	18	16	17	7	11	12	11	13	15	11	9	10	17	45
16	(Italy) Davide Mei	Beta	Junior 1	13	Ret	14	13	22	41	17	15	22	18	18	19	13	14	14
17	(Czech Republic) Matěj Škuta	Beta	Junior 2	Ret	20	15	11	20	24	22	Ret	15	12	20	18			11
18	(Sweden) Alfons Lindström	Husqvarna	Junior 2	23	21	22	12	28	28	15	20	14	23	16	13	19	15	11
19	(Sweden) Robin Gunnarsson	Triumph	Junior 1					12	16	16	Ret	17	17	12	Ret			8
20	(United Kingdom) Samuel Hughes	KTM	Junior 2	15	19	20	19	11	18	23	17	28	24					6
21	(France) Marc-Antoine Rossi	Honda	Junior 1	Ret	12													4
22	(France) Dorian Simon	Beta	Junior 1					13	29	19	18	Ret	DNS	15	22			4
23	(Spain) Aleix Saumell	Sherco	Junior 1	14	15	18	Ret							26	29	Ret	DNS	3
24	(Spain) Nil Rojas	Beta	Junior 1			Ret	Ret	38	20	Ret	DNS			23	14	Ret	Ret	2
25	(Spain) Albert Fontova	KTM	Junior 2	16	Ret	Ret	Ret	19	17	18	16	18	14	24	DNS	18	16	2
26	(Germany) Leon Thoms	Triumph	Junior 2	25	26	26	25	35	27	24	24	21	21	25	15	21	Ret	1
Pos	Rider	Bike	Class	ITA (Italy)		ESP (Spain)		FIN (Finland)		POR (Portugal)		POR (Portugal)		FRA (France)		GBR (United Kingdom)		Points

=== Junior 1 ===
Junior 1 is for motorcycles up to and including 250cc, both 2-stroke and 4-stroke.

Pos	Rider	Bike	ITA (Italy)		ESP (Spain)		FIN (Finland)		POR (Portugal)		POR (Portugal)		FRA (France)		GBR (United Kingdom)		Points
1	(Italy) Alberto Elgari	TM	1	1	1	1	2	1	1	2	2	1	2	1	2	2	262
2	(France) Leo Joyon	Triumph	2	2	2	2	1	2	2	1	1	2	1	2	1	1	256
3	(France) Clement Clauzier	Beta	3	3	4	6	3	3	5	4	3	3	3	4	6	5	186
4	(Italy) Valentino Corsi	Honda	4	4	3	4	10	5	6	3	6	4	7	6	4	3	166
5	(Italy) Luca Colorio	Triumph	5	5	5	3	7	4	3	5	4	5	6	5	7	6	160
6	(Hungary) Roland Liszka	Triumph	6	8	7	8	4	6	4	6	5	Ret	4	3	3	4	148
7	(Italy) Davide Mei	Beta	7	Ret	6	5	9	20	8	7	8	7	9	9	5	7	105
8	(Sweden) Arvid Modin	Triumph	9	9	9	7	8	8	Ret	DNS	Ret	DNS	10	8	8	8	76
9	(United Kingdom) Callum Hughes	Beta	12	13	10	10	13	11	Ret	15	10	14	11	10	10	9	60
10	(Sweden) Robin Gunnarsson	Triumph					5	7	7	Ret	7	6	5	Ret			59
11	(Spain) Liam Sanjuan	Rieju	14	14	11	9			11	12	9	8	15	14	9	10	56
12	(France) Dorian Simon	Beta					6	12	9	8	Ret	DNS	8	11			42
13	(Mexico) Miguel Ruiz de Chavez	Fantic	10	10	13	13	17	15	12	9	11	9					42
14	(Mexico) Alberto González	KTM	15	11	14	16	18	14	13	10	12	12	16	16	13	11	35
15	(Belgium) Hugo Vukcevic	Sherco	Ret	15	15	12			10	11	13	11	Ret	12	Ret	DNS	29
16	(Spain) Aleix Saumell	Sherco	8	7	8	DNS							13	17	Ret	DNS	28
17	(Spain) Nil Rojas	Beta			Ret	Ret	19	9	Ret	DNS			12	7	Ret	Ret	20
18	(United Kingdom) Roan Delaney	Sherco	16	16	18	17	20	19	14	13	14	13	Ret	Ret	11	12	19
19	(Portugal) Francisco Leite	Triumph	Ret	17	16	14	16	17	Ret	14	15	10	Ret	18	14	Ret	13
20	(Italy) Samuli Boano	TM	11	Ret	12	15	15	18					17	Ret			11
21	(France) Marc-Antoine Rossi	Honda	Ret	6													10
22	(Sweden) Kalle Ahlin	KTM					12	10									10
23	(Finland) Jonni Hujala	KTM					11	13									8
24	(United Kingdom) Will Barnett	KTM											18	15	12	13	8
25	(Sweden) Edvin Wiberg	Beta	13	12													7
26	(Finland) Tiitus Enjala	Yamaha	Ret	Ret	17	11											5
27	(France) Matteo Arrieta	TM											14	13			5
28	(Sweden) Sebastian Olsen	KTM					14	16									2
29	(New Zealand) Dylan Huddleston	Sherco							15	17	16	15					2
	(United States) Chase Bright	Triumph							Ret	16							0
	(Colombia) Martín Chica	KTM											19	19			0
	(United Kingdom) Robert Moyer	Sherco			Ret	DNS											0
Pos	Rider	Bike	ITA (Italy)		ESP (Spain)		FIN (Finland)		POR (Portugal)		POR (Portugal)		FRA (France)		GBR (United Kingdom)		Points

=== Junior 2 ===
Junior 2 is for motorcycles over 255cc, both 2-stroke and 4-stroke.

Pos	Rider	Bike	ITA (Italy)		ESP (Spain)		FIN (Finland)		POR (Portugal)		POR (Portugal)		FRA (France)		GBR (United Kingdom)		Points
1	(France) Romain Dagna	KTM	1	1	1	1	1	3	4	5	1	3	2	3	2	6	233
2	(Italy) Kevin Cristino	Husqvarna	3	4	2	4	2	1	3	1	2	2	5	4	6	1	218
3	(France) Thibault Giraudon	Fantic	4	2	4	20	3	4	1	3	6	1	1	1	3	4	204
4	(Italy) Manuel Verzeroli	TM	Ret	3	5	5	6	5	5	2	5	4	4	2	1	2	177
5	(Australia) William Dennett	Triumph	5	7	6	2	13	2	2	4	4	6			4	3	148
6	(Spain) Alex Puey	KTM	6	6	3	6	5	9	6	6	3	7	3	11	5	7	147
7	(Czech Republic) Jaroslav Kalný	Sherco	9	10	10	11	4	7	8	8	8	10	7	5	7	10	111
8	(France) Diego Haution	Beta	12	8	7	3	8	6	16	11	12	11	6	6	9	5	106
9	(France) Maxime Clauzier	Beta	2	5	8	9	Ret	8	7	7	7	5			8	Ret	97
10	(Sweden) Alfons Lindström	Husqvarna	13	13	13	8	15	17	9	12	9	14	8	7	11	8	68
11	(Spain) Albert Fontova	KTM	8	Ret	Ret	Ret	11	10	10	9	11	9	12	DNS	10	9	61
12	(Czech Republic) Matěj Škuta	Beta	Ret	12	9	7	12	14	12	Ret	10	8	10	10			56
13	(United Kingdom) Jack Keenan	Triumph	10	14	16	13	10	13	11	13	13	12	11	9	12	11	56
14	(United Kingdom) Samuel Hughes	KTM	7	11	12	12	7	11	13	10	15	15					47
15	(Germany) Leon Thoms	Triumph	14	15	15	15	19	16	14	14	14	13	13	8	13	Ret	28
16	(Portugal) Rúben Ferreira	KTM	11	9	14	14	9	18									23
17	(France) Antonin Mille	Honda			11	10							9	12			22
18	(United Kingdom) Burts Crayston	KTM													14	12	6
19	(Finland) Niko Puotsaari	Husqvarna			19	19	18	Ret					14	13			5
20	(United Kingdom) Jacob Potts	TM	17	18	20	Ret	20	21	17	15	17	Ret	16	15	16	13	5
21	(Finland) Albert Juhola	KTM					17	12									4
22	(Germany) Garry Dittmann	TM											15	14			3
23	(Finland) Juho Ahokas	Beta					14	15									3
24	(United Kingdom) Kit Szabo	Sherco	16	17	18	18	21	20	Ret	DNS	16	16	Ret	Ret	15	Ret	1
25	(Spain) Lluis Gonfaus	KTM			Ret	16	16	19	15	Ret							1
26	(United Kingdom) Sion Evans	TM	15	16	17	17											1
	(Finland) Tiitus Enjala	Yamaha					Ret	DNS									0
Pos	Rider	Bike	ITA (Italy)		ESP (Spain)		FIN (Finland)		POR (Portugal)		POR (Portugal)		FRA (France)		GBR (United Kingdom)		Points

== Youth ==
All riders competing in the Youth world championship must be younger than 21 years of age on 1 January of the year of the championship.

Only 2-stroke motorcycles between 100cc-125cc can be used.

=== Participants ===
Youth Riders
Team	Constructor	No	Rider	Rounds
Agon Squadra Corse	TM	3	(Italy) Gabriele Melchiorri	1–4, 6–7
RFME Spain National Team	KTM	8	(Spain) Yago Dominguez	All
RFME Spain National Team	KTM	21	(Spain) Pol Guerrero	All
KTM Scandinavia/Team KTM Pro Racing	KTM	18	(Sweden) Mille Söderblom	All
WP Eric Augé	Husqvarna	29	(Sweden) Wiggo Lifvendahl	1–4
Team KTM Pro Racing	KTM	24	(France) Gabin Allemand	1, 3–4, 6–7
Team KTM Pro Racing	KTM	30	(Italy) Simone Cagnoni	All
	Fantic	31	(Finland) Martti Tammelin	1–3
Costa Ligure TM Youth Team	TM	46	(Italy) Gabriele Giordano	1–4, 6–7
Costa Ligure TM Youth Team	TM	50	(Italy) Alessio Berger	1–3, 6
Costa Ligure TM Youth Team	TM	83	(Italy) Pietro Scardina	All
Costa Ligure TM Youth Team	TM	237	(Italy) Matteo Giuliani	6
Costa Ligure TM Youth Team	TM	271	(Italy) Mattia Santi	6
S3 Parts/Alpinestars	Beta	85	(United Kingdom) Fraiser Lampkin	1–3, 6–7
Fantic Factory Racing Enduro Team Specia	Fantic	88	(Italy) Riccardo Pasquato	1–2, 6–7
Fantic Factory Racing Enduro Team Specia	Fantic	132	(France) Valentin Mersin	All
SE Team	Yamaha	107	(Finland) Ukko Laaksonen	2–3
Team GP Motors	Beta	108	(France) Benjamin Sicard	1–2, 4–7
Team GP Motors	Beta	247	(France) Eneko Ithurburu	6
	Sherco	109	(Spain) José Manuel Pellicer	2–7
Ace Suspension/John Shirt Motorcycles	Gas Gas	117	(United Kingdom) Charlie Crossland	1–2, 4–5, 7
PAR Hones Enduro Team	KTM	125	(United Kingdom) Rees Jones	All
Entrophy Enduro Team	Beta	147	(Italy) Manuel Savi	1, 4–5, 7
Beta Trueba	Beta	168	(Spain) Guillem Sucarrats	1–2
	TM	203	(Italy) Pierpaolo Mosca	1
Sherco Academy France	Sherco	208	(France) Evan Bonnet	6
Sherco Academy France	Sherco	234	(France) Ewen Forestier-Chiron	6
ASR	KTM	212	(United Kingdom) Joshua Lawer	7
	Yamaha	215	(France) Emerick Pereira	6
Seventy Group	Beta	217	(Italy) Gioele Scibilia	1
Seventy Group	Beta	275	(Sweden) William Almen	1
	KTM	221	(Germany) Nicklas Lohe	7
	KTM	227	(France) Mae Rogier	2
Team Fantic Racing Enduro France	Fantic	235	(France) Léo Lavesvre	6
Team Fantic Racing Enduro France	Fantic	269	(France) Edgar Connes	6
Team Fantic Racing Enduro France	Fantic	281	(France) Raphaël Raynaud	2, 6
OnlyStans Offroad Experience/Geartec	Husqvarna	238	(United Kingdom) Reece Jones	7
RC Motorsport	Husqvarna	250	(France) Antonio Negri	6
Kytönen Motorsport	Husqvarna	261	(Finland) Jere Jokinen	3
Dafy Enduro Team	KTM	288	(France) Diego Foucher	2
TM Racing España	TM	292	(Spain) Hugo Cuesta	2, 6
	KTM	293	(France) Tom Allemand	6

Pos	Rider	Bike	ITA (Italy)		ESP (Spain)		FIN (Finland)		POR (Portugal)		POR (Portugal)		FRA (France)		GBR (United Kingdom)		Points
1	(Italy) Pietro Scardina	TM	1	4	1	3	2	Ret	1	1	1	1	2	1	2	1	239
2	(France) Valentin Mersin	Fantic	14	3	5	5	1	2	2	2	2	2	4	4	1	4	203
3	(Italy) Simone Cagnoni	KTM	3	2	4	2	5	3	3	4	3	3	1	2	7	5	203
4	(Spain) Yago Dominguez	KTM	4	5	3	4	4	1	4	3	4	4	3	8	3	2	194
5	(Italy) Riccardo Pasquato	Fantic	2	1	2	1							6	5	4	3	123
6	(Italy) Gabriele Melchiorri	TM	5	6	6	7	3	6	Ret	DNS			7	7	5	6	104
7	(Spain) Pol Guerrero	KTM	7	Ret	7	6	13	10	5	9	8	9	11	Ret	9	7	91
8	(Sweden) Mille Söderblom	KTM	17	12	23	14	9	7	8	5	5	5	18	16	12	11	72
9	(Italy) Gabriele Giordano	TM	9	8	8	9	12	5	6	7			15	13	17	14	70
10	(France) Benjamin Sicard	Beta	10	10	12	11			11	11	6	8	9	10	11	Ret	67
11	(France) Gabin Allemand	KTM	Ret	DNS			6	9	Ret	DNS			5	3	6	8	61
12	(United Kingdom) Rees Jones	KTM	18	14	20	10	16	12	10	6	10	10	17	18	8	9	55
13	(Sweden) Wiggo Lifvendahl	Husqvarna	6	7	9	8	10	4	Ret	Ret							53
14	(Spain) José Manuel Pellicer	Sherco			14	12	14	14	9	10	Ret	6	12	12	14	12	47
15	(Italy) Manuel Savi	Beta	13	Ret					7	8	7	7			16	13	41
16	(United Kingdom) Fraiser Lampkin	Beta	12	11	13	13	8	Ret					16	15	10	10	36
17	(Italy) Alessio Berger	TM	11	16	15	15	11	13					13	9			25
18	(France) Léo Lavesvre	Fantic											8	6			18
19	(United Kingdom) Charlie Crossland	Gas Gas	16	18	19	20			12	12	9	Ret			13	17	18
20	(Finland) Ukko Laaksonen	Yamaha			21	DNS	7	8									17
21	(Italy) Pierpaolo Mosca	TM	8	9													15
22	(France) Raphaël Raynaud	Fantic			11	17							10	17			11
23	(Italy) Matteo Giuliani	TM											14	11			7
24	(France) Diego Foucher	KTM			10	Ret											6
25	(Finland) Martti Tammelin	Fantic	Ret	Ret	22	19	15	11									6
26	(Sweden) William Almen	Beta	15	13													4
27	(Spain) Hugo Cuesta	TM			16	16							Ret	14			2
28	(United Kingdom) Reece Jones	Husqvarna													Ret	15	1
29	(United Kingdom) Joshua Lawer	KTM													15	16	1
30	(Italy) Gioele Scibilia	Beta	Ret	15													1
	(Spain) Guillem Sucarrats	Beta	19	17	17	18											0
	(France) Mae Rogier	KTM			18	Ret											0
	(Germany) Nicklas Lohe	KTM													18	Ret	0
	(France) Evan Bonnet	Sherco											19	19			0
	(France) Emerick Pereira	Yamaha											22	20			0
	(France) Edgar Connes	Fantic											20	24			0
	(Italy) Mattia Santi	TM											23	21			0
	(France) Antonio Negri	Husqvarna											21	23			0
	(France) Tom Allemand	KTM											24	22			0
	(France) Ewen Forestier-Chiron	Sherco											25	25			0
	(Finland) Jere Jokinen	Husqvarna					Ret	DNS									0
	(France) Eneko Ithurburu	Beta											Ret	DNS			0
Pos	Rider	Bike	ITA (Italy)		ESP (Spain)		FIN (Finland)		POR (Portugal)		POR (Portugal)		FRA (France)		GBR (United Kingdom)		Points

== Women ==
Competitors in the Women's world championship can compete on any capacity of motorcycle of their choosing.

=== Participants ===
Women Riders
Team	Constructor	No	Rider	Rounds
K21Moto/Sport Police Nationale	KTM	403	(France) Marine Lemoine	All
ET James Sherco Enduro Team	Sherco	404	(United Kingdom) Nieve Holmes	All
Atomic Moto	Beta	411	(France) Mauricette Brisebard	All
Rieju Factory Team	Rieju	416	(United Kingdom) Rosie Rowett	All
Rieju Factory Team	Rieju	417	(United States) Rachel Gutish	All
WPM Motors	Kawasaki	422	(Norway) Vilde Holt	All
RFME Spain National Team	Rieju	429	(Spain) Maria San Miguel	All
Enduro Engineering Race Team	Triumph	450	(Canada) Shelby Turner	3–4
Jetmar Husqvarna Portugal	Husqvarna	474	(Portugal) Joana Gonçalves	All
Team Ambiance Moto	Beta	495	(France) Justine Martel	All
Junior Women Riders
Team	Constructor	No	Rider	Rounds
Team RC Motorsport	Husqvarna	407	(France) Lorna Lafont	All
	Fantic	412	(France) Charlene Boudon	All
WP Eric Augé	Husqvarna	432	(Colombia) Daniella Acosta	5
Husqvarna Motorcycles Spain	Husqvarna	441	(Spain) Mireia Rabionet	2
Electraction TM Moto UK	TM	444	(United Kingdom) Elizabeth Tett	All
Planet Racing	Triumph	451	(Italy) Sara Traini	1–4
Entrophy Enduro Team	Beta	472	(Italy) Aurora Pittaluga	5
Gmoto Store	KTM	484	(Poland) Maja Kozłowska	1

=== Riders Championship ===
Pos	Rider	Bike	ITA (Italy)		ESP (Spain)		POR (Portugal)		POR (Portugal)		GBR (United Kingdom)		Points
1	(United States) Rachel Gutish	Rieju	2	3	1	3	1	1	2	2	2	1	178
2	(United Kingdom) Rosie Rowett	Rieju	9	9	2	1	3	5	8	3	1	2	137
3	(United Kingdom) Nieve Holmes	Sherco	5	6	3	2	4	4	9	9	3	3	123
4	(France) Justine Martel	Beta	1	1	13	7	5	7	5	7	5	4	116
5	(France) Marine Lemoine	KTM	12	2	4	6	6	3	6	6	6	5	110
6	(France) Lorna Lafont	Husqvarna	4	7	6	5	7	9	12	8	10	7	86
7	(Portugal) Joana Gonçalves	Husqvarna	8	10	10	9	8	6	3	4	11	10	84
8	(France) Mauricette Brisebard	Beta	6	4	8	10	9	8	11	11	4	9	82
9	(Canada) Shelby Turner	Triumph					2	2	1	1			74
10	(France) Charlene Boudon	Fantic	10	8	9	11	10	13	10	12	8	8	61
11	(Spain) Maria San Miguel	Rieju	7	11	5	8	Ret	11	7	10	9	Ret	60
12	(United Kingdom) Elizabeth Tett	TM	11	12	11	13	Ret	12	4	5	7	Ret	54
13	(Italy) Sara Traini	Triumph	3	5	Ret	4	11	14	Ret	DNS			46
14	(Norway) Vilde Holt	Kawasaki	14	13	12	12	Ret	10	Ret	DNS	12	6	33
15	(Spain) Mireia Rabionet	Husqvarna			7	DNS							9
16	(Italy) Aurora Pittaluga	Beta									13	11	8
17	(Colombia) Daniella Acosta	Husqvarna									14	12	6
18	(Poland) Maja Kozłowska	KTM	13	14									5
Pos	Rider	Bike	ITA (Italy)		ESP (Spain)		POR (Portugal)		POR (Portugal)		GBR (United Kingdom)		Points

=== Junior Women ===
Pos	Rider	Bike	ITA (Italy)		ESP (Spain)		POR (Portugal)		POR (Portugal)		GBR (United Kingdom)		Points
1	(France) Lorna Lafont	Husqvarna	2	2	1	2	1	1	3	2	3	1	178
2	(France) Charlene Boudon	Fantic	3	3	3	3	2	3	2	3	2	2	158
3	(United Kingdom) Elizabeth Tett	TM	4	4	4	4	Ret	2	1	1	1	Ret	129
4	(Italy) Sara Traini	Triumph	1	1	Ret	1	3	4	Ret	DNS			88
5	(Italy) Aurora Pittaluga	Beta									4	3	28
6	(Colombia) Daniella Acosta	Husqvarna									5	4	24
7	(Poland) Maja Kozłowska	KTM	5	5									22
8	(Spain) Mireia Rabionet	Husqvarna			2	DNS							17
Pos	Rider	Bike	ITA (Italy)		ESP (Spain)		POR (Portugal)		POR (Portugal)		GBR (United Kingdom)		Points

== Open World Cup ==
=== Participants ===
Open 2-stroke Riders
Team	Constructor	No	Rider	Rounds
Moto RS Team	Sherco	501	(Poland) Aleksander Bracik	1
KBS Team	Gas Gas	503	(Czech Republic) Robert Friedrich	1–3, 5–7
TM Costa Ligure Kapriol Boano	TM	505	(Italy) Jeremy Boano	4–7
	KTM	506	(Switzerland) Michael Besse	6
JLD2Roues/Beta Motor France	Beta	515	(France) Logan Merlier	2, 4–7
KTM Spain	KTM	518	(Spain) Jordi Quer	2, 4–7
Beta UK/John Lee Motorcycles	Beta	521	(United Kingdom) Ross Danby	7
Rieju Factory Team	Rieju	522	(Spain) Jordi Galera	All
Team LMSens	Husqvarna	523	(France) Thomas Poux	6
	Sherco	531	(France) Thomas Ravail	6
	KTM	543	(France) Enzo Gros	6
	KTM	558	(Spain) José Maria Sanchez	3, 6
AL860 Motosport	Beta	560	(Italy) Andrea La Scala	All
Team GP Motors	Beta	566	(France) Clément Daussat Daure	6
Electraction TM Racing UK	TM	567	(United Kingdom) Jordan Scott	7
Electraction TM Racing UK	TM	580	(United Kingdom) Gethin Humphreys	4–5
	Fantic	569	(Finland) Riku-Robin Ratinen	3
Team Moto Service	Sherco	572	(Italy) Giuseppe Mineo Grippi	1
Team KTM Pro Racing	Gas Gas	575	(Poland) Kacper Baklarz	All
	TM	581	(United Kingdom) Owain Humphreys	7
Classic Car Club Manhattan	Beta	596	(Germany) Tim Apolle	4–5
	KTM	597	(Spain) Borja Francés	3
Open 4-stroke Riders
Team	Constructor	No	Rider	Rounds
K21Moto/Sport Police Nationale	KTM	403	(France) Marine Lemoine	6
	KTM	602	(France) Iban Etchegoimberry	2, 6
	TM	603	(Italy) Tommaso Fusi	1–2
Dirt Store Triumph	Triumph	605	(United Kingdom) Sam Davies	7
Dirt Store Triumph	Triumph	610	(United Kingdom) Richard Ely	2, 7
Triumph Clermont 63	Triumph	606	(France) Franck Luberriaga	2, 4
RC Motorsport	Husqvarna	611	(France) Enzo Cozzi	2
	KTM	616	(Spain) Pau Valero	All
	KTM	619	(Italy) Lorenzo Bernini	2–5
	TM	620	(France) Hugo Junique	6
	Gas Gas	621	(Spain) Marco Ivanez	4
	KTM	622	(Switzerland) Steve Erzer	6
	Honda	627	(United Kingdom) Niles Reid	6–7
	Honda	629	(Italy) Mirco Attorni	2
Kawasaki Toulouse	Kawasaki	630	(France) Cyril Bertelli	6
Instatech Racing Team	Triumph	631	(Sweden) Anton Lindgarde	3
QBG Racing Sherco	Sherco	634	(United Kingdom) Ben Thomson	All
Elite Moto 15 Enduro Team	KTM	635	(France) Antoine Faveyrial	6
Team Moto Service	Sherco	639	(Italy) Vincenzo D'angelo	1
SGS Racing	Beta	640	(Italy) Lorenzo Staccioli	1–2, 4, 6
	Sherco	641	(United Kingdom) Freddie Davis	2
	TM	644	(Finland) Aleksi Alanne	1, 3
	Fantic	647	(United Kingdom) Josh Kirby	6
Team KTM Pro Racing	KTM	651	(Sweden) Robin Wiss	1–5
	KTM	657	(Finland) Janne Rantanen	3
Team GP Motors	Beta	661	(France) Alex Pichaud	1–2, 4–7
Team LMSens	Husqvarna	663	(France) Enzo Vimond	6
John Shirt Motorcycles	Gas Gas	666	(United Kingdom) Will Keenan	4–5
	TM	669	(United States) Luke Ross	7
Electraction TM Racing UK	TM	680	(United Kingdom) Gethin Humphreys	7
	Triumph	686	(Spain) Enrique Pedraza	2, 4, 6
Motissimo/Triumph Offroad Barcelona	Triumph	690	(Spain) David Riera	2, 4–5
WP Eric Augé	KTM	693	(Israel) Inbar Selinger	2, 4–6
	Fantic	694	(Finland) Markus Nylanden	2–3, 6
Johansson MPE	Triumph	696	(United Kingdom) Tristan Young	1–6
RB Motorsports	Fantic	698	(Germany) Stefan Tietgen-Wollschläger	7

=== Open 2-stroke ===
Open 2-Stroke is for 2-stroke motorcycles of any engine capacity.

Pos	Rider	Bike	ITA (Italy)		ESP (Spain)		FIN (Finland)		POR (Portugal)		POR (Portugal)		FRA (France)		GBR (United Kingdom)		Points
1	(Spain) Jordi Quer	KTM			1	1			1	2	1	1	1	1	1	1	160
2	(Spain) Jordi Galera	Rieju	1	1	2	2	1	1	2	1	3	4	3	2	3	3	151
3	(Poland) Kacper Baklarz	Gas Gas	4	2	4	3	3	4	3	3	2	2	5	3	6	5	126
4	(Czech Republic) Robert Friedrich	Gas Gas	2	3	3	4	2	2			6	6	4	4	4	4	120
5	(Italy) Andrea La Scala	Beta	5	5	5	5	5	5	6	6	7	7	6	5	7	7	87
6	(France) Logan Merlier	Beta			6	6			7	7	8	9	11	7	9	10	69
7	(United Kingdom) Gethin Humphreys	TM							4	4	4	3					54
8	(Italy) Jeremy Boano	TM							Ret	8	9	8	9	10	8	8	52
9	(Germany) Tim Apolle	Beta							5	5	5	5					44
10	(United Kingdom) Jordan Scott	TM													2	2	34
11	(Finland) Riku-Robin Ratinen	Fantic					4	3									28
12	(Poland) Aleksander Bracik	Sherco	3	4													28
13	(United Kingdom) Ross Danby	Beta													5	6	21
14	(Spain) Borja Francés	KTM					6	6									20
15	(Italy) Giuseppe Mineo Grippi	Sherco	6	6													20
16	(France) Thomas Poux	Husqvarna											7	6			19
17	(France) Thomas Ravail	Sherco											2	Ret			17
18	(France) Enzo Gros	KTM											8	8			16
19	(Switzerland) Michael Besse	KTM											10	9			13
20	(Spain) José Maria Sanchez	KTM					7	Ret					Ret	DNS			9
21	(United Kingdom) Owain Humphreys	TM													Ret	9	7
	(France) Clément Daussat Daure	Beta											Ret	DNS			0
Pos	Rider	Bike	ITA (Italy)		ESP (Spain)		FIN (Finland)		POR (Portugal)		POR (Portugal)		FRA (France)		GBR (United Kingdom)		Points

=== Open 4-stroke ===
Open 4-Stroke is for 4-stroke motorcycles of any engine capacity.

Pos	Rider	Bike	ITA (Italy)		ESP (Spain)		FIN (Finland)		POR (Portugal)		POR (Portugal)		FRA (France)		GBR (United Kingdom)		Points
1	(Italy) Lorenzo Bernini	KTM			1	1	1	1	1	1	1	1					160
2	(France) Alex Pichaud	Beta	5	1	3	4			3	3	4	3	2	1	2	3	134
3	(Sweden) Robin Wiss	KTM	2	4	6	3	2	3	6	5	7	4					111
4	(United Kingdom) Ben Thomson	Sherco	1	2	10	5	4	5	5	Ret	6	Ret	7	Ret	4	5	107
5	(Israel) Inbar Selinger	KTM			4	14			4	4	3	2	4	3			101
6	(United Kingdom) Tristan Young	Triumph	4	5	8	6	7	4	8	7	8	6	5	Ret			86
7	(Spain) Pau Valero	KTM	Ret	6	11	10	5	8	9	Ret	9	5	9	9	6	Ret	71
8	(Spain) David Riera	Triumph			Ret	2			2	2	2	Ret					68
9	(Italy) Lorenzo Staccioli	Beta	6	7	5	8			11	Ret			Ret	DNS			43
10	(United Kingdom) Richard Ely	Triumph			7	7									5	4	42
11	(United Kingdom) Sam Davies	Triumph													1	1	40
12	(France) Antoine Faveyrial	KTM											1	2			37
13	(Finland) Aleksi Alanne	TM	7	9			6	6									36
14	(United Kingdom) Gethin Humphreys	TM													3	2	32
15	(Sweden) Anton Lindgarde	Triumph					3	2									32
16	(Italy) Vincenzo D'angelo	Sherco	3	3													30
17	(United Kingdom) Will Keenan	Gas Gas							7	6	5	DNS					30
18	(France) Enzo Vimond	Husqvarna											3	4			28
19	(Spain) Enrique Pedraza	Triumph			13	12			10	8			13	12			28
20	(France) Iban Etchegoimberry	KTM			14	11							11	6			22
21	(Italy) Tommaso Fusi	TM	8	8	12	DNS											20
22	(United States) Luke Ross	TM													7	6	19
23	(Switzerland) Steve Erzer	KTM											6	7			19
24	(France) Franck Luberriaga	Triumph			2	Ret			Ret	DNS							17
25	(United Kingdom) Josh Kirby	Fantic											10	5			17
26	(Germany) Stefan Tietgen-Wollschläger	Fantic													8	7	17
27	(Finland) Janne Rantanen	KTM					8	7									17
28	(Finland) Markus Nylanden	Fantic			Ret	13	Ret	9					14	11			17
29	(France) Hugo Junique	TM											8	8			16
30	(France) Enzo Cozzi	Husqvarna			9	9											14
31	(France) Cyril Bertelli	Kawasaki											12	10			10
32	(United Kingdom) Niles Reid	Honda											16	Ret	Ret	8	8
33	(Spain) Marco Ivanez	Gas Gas							12	DNS							4
34	(France) Marine Lemoine	KTM											15	13			4
	(Italy) Mirco Attorni	Honda			Ret	Ret											0
	(United Kingdom) Freddie Davis	Sherco			Ret	DNS											0
Pos	Rider	Bike	ITA (Italy)		ESP (Spain)		FIN (Finland)		POR (Portugal)		POR (Portugal)		FRA (France)		GBR (United Kingdom)		Points
