= Brian Roper =

Brian or Bryan Roper may refer to:

- Brian Roper (actor) (1929–1994), British and American actor
- Brian Roper (economist) (born 1949), British economist and former vice-chancellor of London Metropolitan University
- Brian Roper (Gaelic footballer), Irish sportsperson
- Bryan Roper (motorcyclist) (born 1993), American motorcycle trials rider
