= Logan Bolopue =

American motorcycle racer

- Nationality: (United States) American
- Born: 19 November 1994 (age 32); Beech Creek, Pennsylvania, United States
- Current team: Sherco Factory Team

Logan Bolopue (born 19 November 1994 in Beach Creek, Pennsylvania, United States), is a National motorcycle trials rider. Bolopue won the American NATC Expert National Championship and currently rides in the NATC Pro Class for Sherco.

== Biography ==
Bolopue has progressed through the trials ranks quickly, winning the junior class after his debut season in 2009 then following up with a championship win in the 125cc expert class in 2010.

In 2011, Bolopue moved up to the Expert class and won the title ahead of defending champion Ray Peters.

Bolopue moved up to the Pro class in 2012 and in 2013 finished third behind Patrick Smage and Bryan Roper.

The 2014 championship was again won by Smage with Czech rider Martin Matejick runner-up and Bolopue in third for the season.

== National Trials Championship Career ==
Year	Class	Machine	Rd 1	Rd 2	Rd 3	Rd 4	Rd 5	Rd 6	Rd 7	Rd 8	Rd 9	Rd 10	Points	Pos	Notes
2009	(United States) NATC High School	Sherco	NE -	NE -	TN -	TN -	VT -	VT; 1	NY; 1	NY; 1			90	5th	
2010	(United States) NATC Expert 125	Sherco	OK; 2	OK; 2	RI; 1	RI; 1	NY; 1	NY; 1	CO; 1	CO; 1	CA; 1	CA; 2	180	1st	
2011	(United States) NATC Expert	Sherco	TX; 1	TX; 1	PA; 2	PA; 3	TN; 3	TN; 1	TN; 1				145	1st	
2012	(United States) NATC Pro	Sherco	CA; 9	CA; 8	CO; 8	CO; 8	OH; 6	OH; 7	RI; 7	RI; 7			97	7th	
2013	(United States) NATC Pro	Sherco	NY; 3	NY; 4	VT; 4	VT; 3	AZ; 3	AZ; 4	NM; 2	NM; 3	MN; 4	MN; 4	181	3rd	
2014	(United States) NATC Pro	Sherco	CO; 3	CO; 4	KS; 3	KS; 3	PA; 4	PA; 4	TN; 5	TN; 5			133	3rd	
2015	(United States) NATC Pro	Sherco	TX; 6	TX; 5	AZ; 5	AZ; 5	NE; 4	NE; 6	OH; 5	OH; 5	WY; 4	WY; 4	164	5th	Ute cup winner (RMTA) / member of US Trial des Nations team
2016	(United States) NATC Pro	Sherco	FL; 6	FL; 5	TN; 5	TN; 7	OR; 7	OR; 4	CO; 7	CO; 7			107	6th	

== International Trials Championship Career ==
Year	Class	Machine	Rd 1	Rd 2	Rd 3	Rd 4	Rd 5	Rd 6	Rd 7	Rd 8	Rd 9	Rd 10	Rd 11	Rd 12	Rd 13	Rd 14	Rd 15	Rd 16	Rd 17	Rd 18	Points	Pos	Notes
2013	FIM Junior Championship	Sherco	JAP -	JAP -	USA; 15	USA; 15	AND -	AND -	SPA -	ITA -	CZE -	GBR -	GBR -	FRA -	FRA -						2	26th	
2015	FIM Junior Championship	Sherco	JAP -	JAP -	CZE -	CZE -	SWE -	SWE -	GBR -	GBR -	FRA -	FRA -	AND -	AND -	USA -	USA; 14	POR -	POR -	SPA -	SPA -	2	30th	

== Honors ==
- NATC Junior Champion 2009
- NATC 125cc Expert Trials Champion 2010
- NATC Expert Trials Champion 2011

== Related Reading ==
- NATC Trials Championship
- FIM Trial European Championship
- FIM Trial World Championship
