= Samuel Fastle =

American motorcycle racer

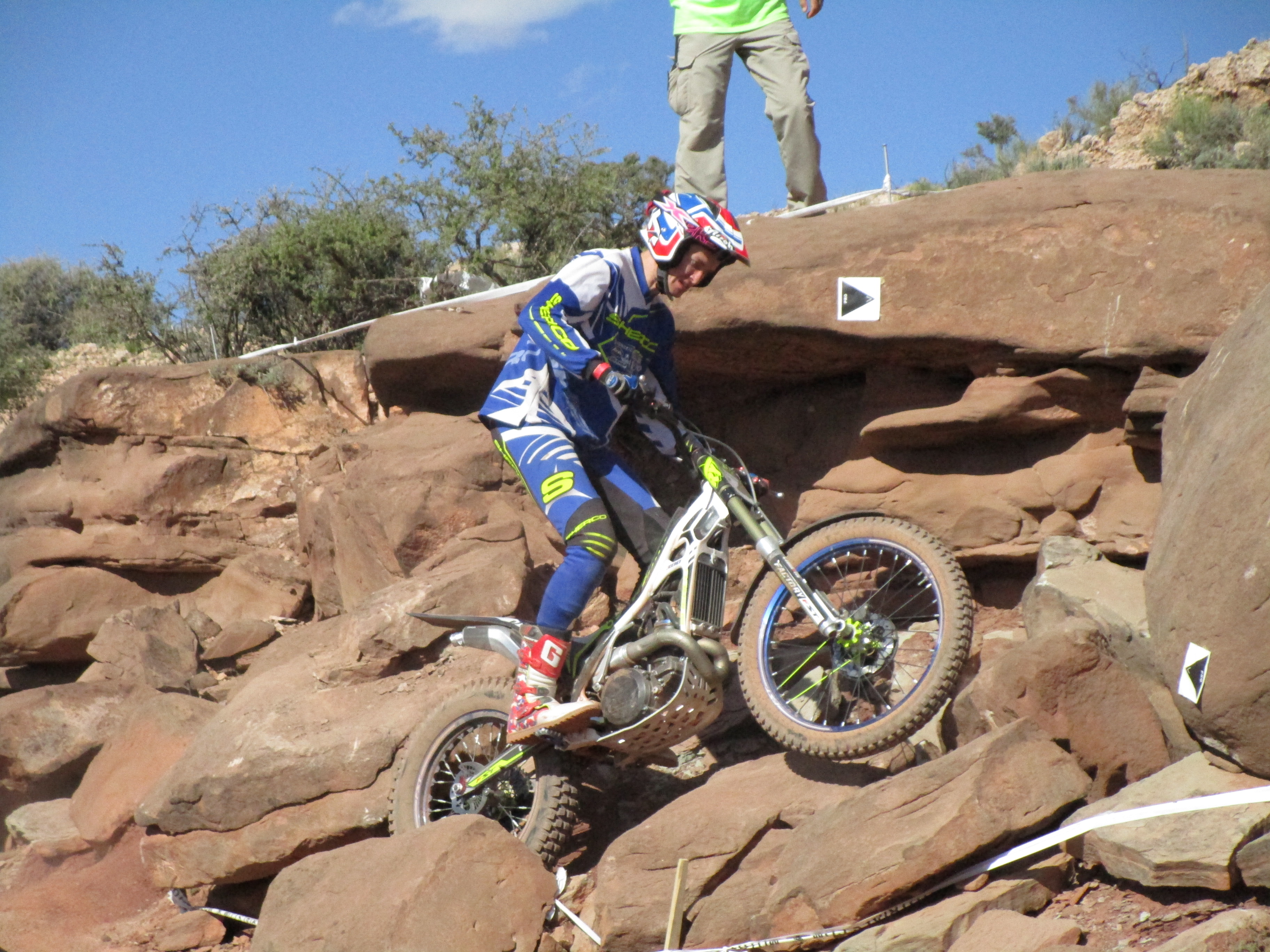
- Fastle at NATC Nationals Round 1 Roswell NM 2018
- Nationality: (United States) American
- Born: June 1, 1995 (age 31); Albuquerque, New Mexico, U.S.
- Current team: Factory Sherco

Samuel Fastle (born June 1, 1995 in Albuquerque, New Mexico) is an American National motorcycle trials rider.

== Biography ==
After several years of riding with the New Mexico Trials Association, working his way up through the classes, Fastle clinched his first US title in 2012 when he became the NATC Expert 125cc Champion after winning six of the eight rounds.

In 2013, Fastle moved up to the NATC Expert class having an excellent season starting out with a third place at the opening New York round behind Ray Peters and Daniel Blanc-Gonnet. Fastle followed this up with a second place behind Peters in Vermont, and a pair of thirds in Arizona behind Peters and fellow New Mexico rider Nathan Hassler. His final ride of the season in Expert was on home soil in New Mexico, Fastle put in a strong ride again finishing runner-up to reigning champion Peters. He ended the year third in the Championship behind Peters and Blanc-Gonnet. One of Fastle's highlights of the season was winning the annual Ute Cup, held in Colorado by the Rocky Mountain Trials Association (RMTA).

For the final three rounds of the season, Fastle moved to the NATC Pro class, finishing fifth in New Mexico, sixth and fifth in Minnesota.

Being a Mormon, Fastle then took two years out, away on a mission for the Church of Jesus Christ of Latter-day Saints.

Returning to the sport in 2016, Fastle picked up where he had left off and finished eighth in the NATC Pro series, with his best rides a pair of sixth places coming in Tennessee and Oregon. He was also named as the alternative rider in the US Men's Trial des Nations team to compete in France.

In 2017, again in NATC Pro, Fastle took a step up to seventh place at the end of the season, having consistent seventh and eighth-place finishes all season, and once again being named as the alternative US Trial des Nations rider for the team this year competing in Spain.

== National Trials Championship Career ==
Year	Class	Machine	Rd 1	Rd 2	Rd 3	Rd 4	Rd 5	Rd 6	Rd 7	Rd 8	Rd 9	Rd 10	Points	Pos	Notes
2009	(United States) NATC Highschool	Sherco	NE; 4	NE; 4	TN; 3	TN; 3	VT; 2	VT; 3	NY; 3	NY; 3			109	2nd	
2010	(United States) NATC Expert 125	Sherco	OK; 4	OK; 4	RI; 4	RI; 4	NY; 4	NY; 4	CO; 4	CO; 2	CA; 4	CA; 4	115	4th	
2011	(United States) NATC Expert 125	Sherco	TX; 2	TX; 1	PN; 2	PN; 2	TN; 2	TN; 1	TN; 2				135	2nd	
2012	(United States) NATC Expert 125	Sherco	CA; 1	CA; 1	CO; 1	CO; 1	OH; 2	OH; 1	RI; 1	RI -			150	1st	
2013	(United States) NATC Expert	Sherco	NY; 3	NY; 4	VT; 2	VT; 6	AZ; 3	AZ; 3	NM; 2	NM -	MN -	MN -	131	3rd	
2013	(United States) NATC Pro	Sherco	NY -	NY -	VT -	VT -	AZ -	AZ -	NM -	NM; 5	MN; 6	MN; 5	47	7th	Ute Cup winner (RMTA)
2016	(United States) NATC Pro	Sherco	FL; 8	FL; 8	TN; 7	TN; 6	OR; 6	OR; 7	CO; 8	CO; 8			97	8th	
2017	(United States) NATC Pro	Sherco	TX; 8	TX; 7	KS; 8	KS; 8	OH; 7	OH; 7	RI; 7	RI; 7			109	7th	
2018	(United States) NATC Pro	Sherco	NM; 4	NM; 4	CO; 4	CO; 4	TN; 5	TN; 5	AR; 4	AR; 4	CA; 4	CA; 4	176	4th	
2019	(United States) NATC Pro	Sherco	NE; 10	NE; 6	MN; 8	MN; 9	CO; 7	CO; 7	OR; 6	OR; 8			107	8th	
2021	(United States) NATC Pro	TRS	PA; 8	PA; 8	OH; 8	OH; 8	AZ; 9	AZ; 9	NM; 8	NM; 8			102	8th	

== Honors ==
- NATC Expert 125cc Champion 2012
