= Andrew Putt =

American motorcycle racer

- Nationality: (United States) American
- Born: July 30, 1998 (age 28); Venetia, Pennsylvania, U.S.
- Current team: Sherco

Andrew Putt (born July 30, 1998 in Venetia, Pennsylvania) is an American International motorcycle trials rider.

== Biography ==
Putt started riding at national level in the Junior class in 2011. The following year, he won the class and with it his first national title.

In 2013, Putt moved up to ride in the NATC Expert championship, finishing a creditable fourth position. He almost clinched the title in 2014 with a spirited second place, being held off all season by defending champion Ray Peters.

2015 was to be a big year for Putt, moving up to ride in the Pro class. He ended the season in the runner-up spot behind multi-time champion Patrick Smage, the highlight of his season being two victories in the final two rounds of the series in Wyoming. Putt was also a member of the 2015 American TDN team alongside Bryan Roper, Logan Bolopue and Daniel Blanc-Gonnet who finished in 5th place after traveling to Tarragona, Spain.

All set for an assault on the title for 2016, things didn't quite go as planned for Putt after former world number two Spaniard Marc Freixa joined the series and won the majority of the rounds. His best finish of the season was a second place behind Freixa in Colorado, and he finished the season in third. Putt didn't finish the season empty handed though, winning the annual El Trial de Espana held by the So-Cal Trials Association (SCTA).

== National Trials Championship Career ==
Year	Class	Machine	Rd 1	Rd 2	Rd 3	Rd 4	Rd 5	Rd 6	Rd 7	Rd 8	Rd 9	Rd 10	Points	Pos	Notes
2013	(United States) NATC Expert		NY; 4	NY; 5	VT; 6	VT; 3	AZ; 4	AZ; 5	NM; 4	NM; 2	MN; 3	MN; 2	128	4th	
2014	(United States) NATC Expert	Sherco	CO; 2	CO; 1	KS; 1	KS; 2	PA; 3	PA; 1	TN; 2	TN; 3			140	2nd	
2015	(United States) NATC Pro	Sherco	TX; 3	TX; 4	AZ; 3	AZ; 4	NE; 2	NE; 2	OH; 3	OH; 2	WY; 1	WY; 1	234	2nd	Member of US Trial des Nations team
2016	(United States) NATC Pro	Sherco	FL; 3	FL; 3	TN; 3	TN; 3	OR; 3	OR; 3	CO; 2	CO; 3			151	3rd	El Trial de Espana winner (SCTA)
2017	(United States) NATC Pro	Sherco	TX; 3	TX; 2	KS; 4	KS; 3	OH; 3	OH; 3	RI; 3	RI; 3			169	3rd	

== Honors ==
- US NATC National Junior Champion 2012
- El Trial de Espana winner 2016
