= Saint-Agrève =

- Commune
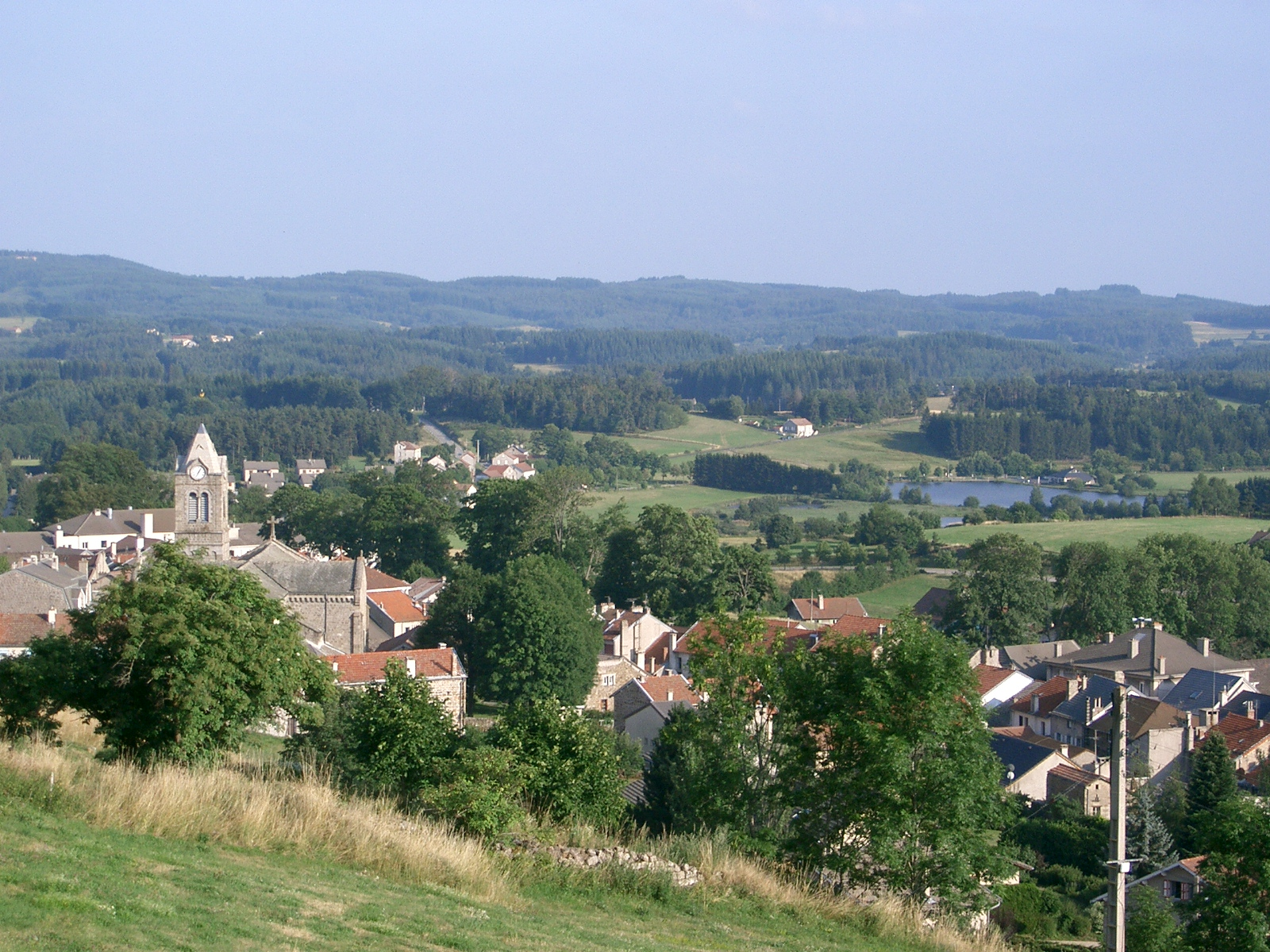
- A general view of Saint-Agrève

- Coat of arms
- Location of Saint-Agrève
- Location within France Location within Auvergne-Rhône-Alpes
- Coordinates: 45°00′39″N 4°23′49″E
- Country: France
- Region: Auvergne-Rhône-Alpes
- Department: Ardèche
- Arrondissement: Tournon-sur-Rhône
- Canton: Haut-Eyrieux

Government
  - Mayor (2020–2026): Michel Villemagne
- Area^{1}: 48.56 km^{2} (18.75 sq mi)
- Elevation: 1,050 m (3,440 ft)
- Highest elevation: 1,183 m (3,881 ft)
- Lowest elevation: 590 m (1,940 ft)
- Population (2023): 2,277
  - Density: 46.89/km^{2} (121.4/sq mi)
- Time zone: UTC+01:00 (CET)
  - Summer (DST): UTC+02:00 (CEST)
- INSEE/Postal code: 07204 /07320
- ^{1} French Land Register data, which excludes lakes, ponds, glaciers > 1 km^{2} (0.386 sq mi or 247 acres) and river estuaries.

Saint-Agrève (French pronunciation: [sɛ̃t‿aɡʁɛv]; Occitan: Sant Agrève) is a commune in the Ardèche department in southern France.

== Population ==
Historical population
Year	Pop.	±% p.a.
1968	2,484	—
1975	2,718	+1.29%
1982	2,723	+0.03%
1990	2,762	+0.18%
1999	2,688	−0.30%
2007	2,565	−0.58%
2012	2,546	−0.15%
2017	2,353	−1.56%
2023	2,277	−0.55%
Source: INSEE

== See also ==
- Communes of the Ardèche department
