= Custonaci =

Custonaci Custunaci
- Comune
- Comune di Custonaci
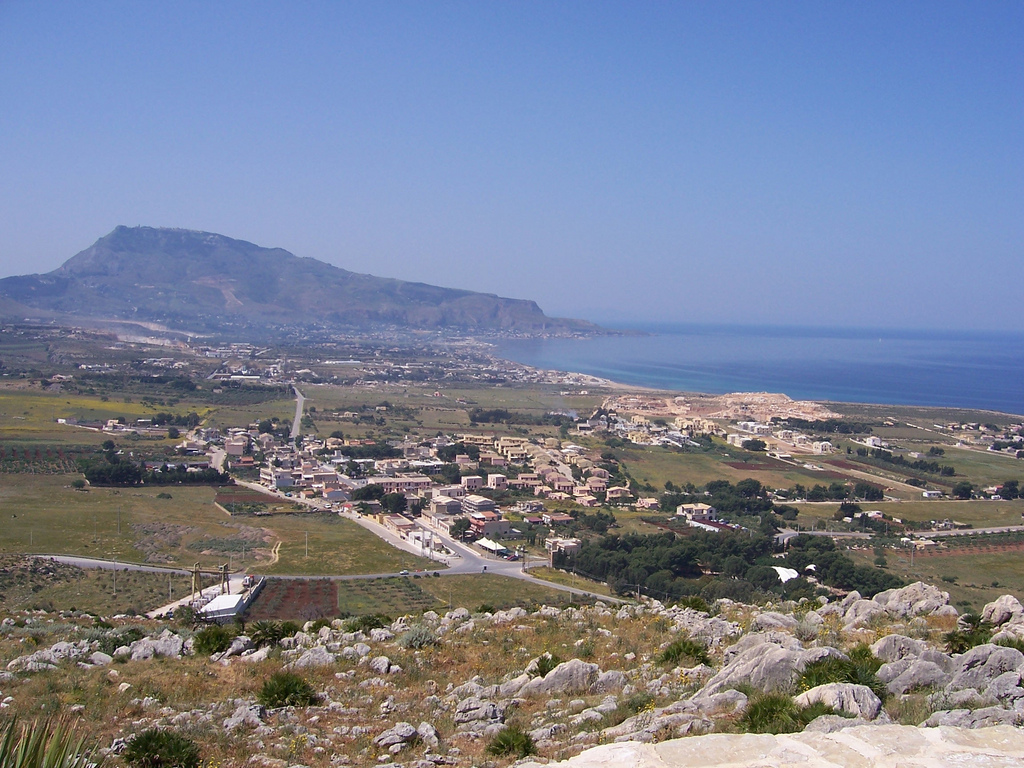

- Location within Italy Location within Sicily
- Coordinates: 38°5′N 12°51′E
- Country: Italy
- Region: Sicily
- Province: Trapani (TP)
- Frazioni: Assieni, Cornino, Purgatorio, Santa Lucia, Sperone, Baglio Messina, Frassino, Scurati

Government
  - Mayor: Giuseppe Bica

Area
  - Total: 69.9 km^{2} (27.0 sq mi)
- Elevation: 186 m (610 ft)

Population (31 March 2018)
  - Total: 5,561
  - Density: 79.6/km^{2} (206/sq mi)
- Demonym(s): Custonacesi, Custonacioti (Sicilian)
- Time zone: UTC+1 (CET)
  - Summer (DST): UTC+2 (CEST)
- Postal code: 91015
- Dialing code: 0923
- Patron saint: Holy Mary of Custonaci
- Saint day: Last Wednesday in August
- Website: Official website

Custonaci (Sicilian: Custunaci) is a town and comune in the province of Trapani, north-Western Sicily, southern Italy.

== Economy ==
The coast around Mount Cofano attracts tourists to the seaside village of Cornino.
