= Bryan Roper (motorcyclist) =

- Nationality: (United States) American
- Born: 14 July 1993 (age 33); Glendale, Arizona, United States
- Current team: Gas Gas

Bryan Roper (born 14 July 1993 in Glendale, AZ, United States), is an American International motorcycle trials rider.

== Biography ==
In 2010, Roper finished second in the NATC Expert series after being runner up to eventual winner Ray Peters at seven rounds. He switched to the Pro class for the final round in California, finishing in fifth place.

Roper's first full season in the NATC Pro class was 2011, a season in which he was consistent and finished fourth overall, his best ride being a third place at the final round in Tennessee. He was selected as a member of the US Trial des Nations team alongside Karl Davis Jr, Eric Storz and Andrew Oldar. The event was held in Tolmezzo, Italy.

2012 was a similar story, fourth overall at seasons end with podium finishes at the California, Ohio and both Rhode Island events. He also competed successfully in Endurocross during the season.

Roper's best season to date was 2013, finishing second in the NATC Pro series to defending champion Patrick Smage after taking second and third places in New York, and runner-up twice in both Vermont and Arizona. Roper never finished off the podium all season. He also competed in the FIM Junior World Championship US rounds, taking a pair of 14th place point scoring finishes.

Only contesting the final four rounds of the 2014 NATC series, due to World Championship obligations, Roper finished fifth in the Pro championship, his best score being a pair of third places in Pennsylvania. The FIM Junior World Championship Spanish round produced a 14th place finish.

More International events during 2015 brought Roper home in 15th place in the FIM Junior World Championship. His best scores were eighth and seventh at the US round, with more point scoring finishes in Czechoslovakia, Sweden and Portugal. On the home front Roper finished third in the NATC Pro series, best finishes of second in both Texas and Arizona.

In the newly renamed 2016 FIM Trial 2 World Championship, Roper scored 11th and tenth at the opening Spanish rounds.

Roper switched from Sherco and joined Geoff Aaron's Gas-Gas US national team at the start of the 2017 season. Competing as a member of the US Trial des Nations team, Roper, Patrick Smage and Daniel Blanc-Gonnet finished second in the Trophy class to the Australian squad. Roper finished fourth in the NATC Pro series, and also won the prestigious Trial de Espana event in California.

== National Trials Championship career ==
Year	Class	Machine	Rd 1	Rd 2	Rd 3	Rd 4	Rd 5	Rd 6	Rd 7	Rd 8	Rd 9	Rd 10	Points	Pos	Notes
2010	(United States) NATC Expert	Sherco	OK; 2	OK; 2	RI; 2	RI; 2	NY; 2	NY; 3	CO; 2	CO; 2	CA -	CA -	150	2nd	
2010	(United States) NATC Pro	Sherco	OK -	OK -	RI -	RI -	NY -	NY -	CO -	CO -	CA; 5	CA; 6	31	9th	
2011	(United States) NATC Pro	Sherco	TX; 4	TX; 4	PA; 4	PA; 4	TN; 4	TN; 6	TN; 3				111	4th	member of US Trial des Nations team
2012	(United States) NATC Pro	Sherco	CA; 5	CA; 3	CO; 4	CO; 5	OH; 4	OH; 3	RI; 3	RI; 3			136	4th	
2013	(United States) NATC Pro	Sherco	NY; 2	NY; 3	VT; 2	VT; 2	AZ; 2	AZ; 2	NM; 3	NM; 2	MN; 3	MN; 3	213	2nd	
2014	(United States) NATC Pro	Sherco	CO -	CO -	KS -	KS -	PA; 3	PA; 3	TN; 4	TN; 4			78	5th	
2015	(United States) NATC Pro	Sherco	TX; 4	TX; 2	AZ; 2	AZ; 3	NE; 3	NE; 3	OH; 4	OH; 3	WY -	WY -	170	3rd	
2017	(United States) NATC Pro	Gas Gas	TX; 4	TX; 4	KS; 3	KS; 4	OH; 4	OH; 4	RI; 4	RI; 4			147	4th	member of US Trial des Nations team/ El Trial de Espana winner

== International Trials Championship career ==
Year	Class	Machine	Rd 1	Rd 2	Rd 3	Rd 4	Rd 5	Rd 6	Rd 7	Rd 8	Rd 9	Rd 10	Rd 11	Rd 12	Rd 13	Rd 14	Rd 15	Rd 16	Rd 17	Rd 18	Points	Pos	Notes
2013	FIM Junior Championship	Sherco	JAP -	JAP -	USA; 14	USA; 14	AND -	AND -	SPA -	ITA -	CZE -	GBR -	GBR -	FRA -	FRA -						4	25th	
2014	FIM Junior Championship	Sherco	AUS -	AUS -	JAP -	JAP -	EUR -	EUR -	ITA -	BEL; 28	GBR -	GBR; 27	FRA -	SPA; 14	SPA; 19						2	34th	
2015	FIM Junior Championship	Sherco	JAP -	JAP -	CZE -	CZE; 14	SWE -	SWE; 13	GBR -	GBR -	FRA -	FRA -	AND; 15	AND; 13	USA; 8	USA; 7	POR; 9	POR -	SPA -	SPA -	33	15th	
2016	FIM Trial 2 Championship	Sherco	SPA; 11	SPA; 10	JAP -	JAP -	GER -	GER -	AND -	AND -	FRA -	FRA -	BEL -	GBR -	GBR -	ITA -	ITA -				11	24th	

== Related Reading ==
- NATC Trials Championship
- FIM Trial European Championship
- FIM Trial World Championship
