= Ray Peters (motorcyclist) =

- Nationality: (United States) American
- Born: 29 October 1973 (age 53); Moreland, New York, United States
- Current team: Factory Beta

C Raymond Peters (born 29 October 1973 in Moreland, New York, United States), is an American International motorcycle trials rider. Peters won the NATC Expert National Championship ten times between 2004 and 2014. Peters is the current Beta USA Trials team Manager.

Peters is currently team manager for the US Beta trials team.

== Biography ==
In 1990, Peters won the NATC High School class and moved straight into the Pro class the following season. After moving up from the High School class, Peters put on a good performance in 1991, ending the season a creditable 9th place with a best of fifth in Pennsylvania.

In 1992, Peters finished sixth in the series and was named as part of the US Trial des Nations team alongside Geoff Aaron, Cory Pincock and Ryan Young, to compete in the international event being held this year at Watkins Glen, Peters' home state. Against the best riders in the world the team came home in ninth place.

Peters became established as a front runner in the NATC Pro class, and proved this by finishing third in the 1993 series behind Young and Aaron, posting three runner-up finishes during the season. Once again named a member of the US Trial des Nations team, Peters competed in Ireland.

1994 was almost a carbon copy of the previous year, producing another third place overall for the season, though this time it was Geoff Aaron who won the title with Ryan Young just ahead of Peters.

After securing 5th place in the national series, Peters was once again off overseas to compete in the Trial des Nations event of 1995, this year held in Piesting, Austria. The US team, consisting of Peters, Geoff Aaron, Jess Kempkes and Matt Moore finished in fourth place out of the 13 countries in the International Trophy event. He also won the annual Rocky Mountain Trials Association Ute Cup event.

A landmark year in 2014 produced a season long battle with Andrew Putt and Alex Niederer which went all the way to the final round in Tennessee at the Sequatchie Trials Training Center. Peters won both Tennessee rounds and took the title from Putt by a mere five points, and with it gained his tenth NATC Expert championship.

== National Trials Championship Career ==
Year	Class	Machine	Rd 1	Rd 2	Rd 3	Rd 4	Rd 5	Rd 6	Rd 7	Rd 8	Rd 9	Rd 10	Rd 11	Rd 12	Rd 13	Points	Pos	Notes
1991	(United States) NATC Pro		10	NM; 10	NM; 7	NE; 8	NE; 10	AL; 13	OH; 10	PA; 5	MA; 8	RI; 6				82	9th	
1993	(United States) NATC Pro	Aprilia	PA; 7	PA; 5	WA; 2	WA; 2	NM; 7	NM; 5	TX; 3	TX; 2						128	3rd	
1994	(United States) NATC Pro	Aprilia	FL; 3	FL; 3	NY; 5	PA; 5	OH; 2	WY; 3	WY; 5	NE; 4	NE; 3					109	3rd	
1995	(United States) NATC Pro	Fantic	AZ; 6	AZ; 6	CA; 5	PA -	NY; 3	RI; 3	RI; 5	CO; 5	CO; 5	OR; 5	OR; 5			108	5th	Ute Cup winner (RMTA)
2001	(United States) NATC Pro	Scorpa	CA; 4	CA; 4	RI; 7	RI; 4	NY -	NY; 6	NM; 4	NM; 3	NE; 5	NE; 3				159	4th	
2002	(United States) NATC Pro	Scorpa	FL; 4	FL; 2	TX; 3	TX; 6	PA; 6	PA; 3	TN -	TN; 5	CO; 5	CO; 3				168	4th	
2003	(United States) NATC Pro	Beta	CA; 5	CA; 6	WA; 6	WA; 5	OR -	OR; 4	PA; 6	PA; 7	RI; 5	RI; 5	WY; 4	WY; 5	CA; 4	193	6th	
2004	(United States) NATC Pro	Beta	TN; 7	TN; 9	CO; 8	CO -	CA -	OH -	OH -	VT -	VT -					39	11th	member of US Trial des Nations team
2004	(United States) NATC Expert	Beta	TN -	TN -	CO -	CO; 1	CA; 2	OH; 1	OH; 1	VT; 1	VT; 1					150	1st	
2005	(United States) NATC Expert	Beta	TX; 1	TX; 1	TN -	TN -	CO; 1	CO; 1	CA; 1	CA; 1	VT; 1	VT -	NY; 1	NY; 1		210	1st	
2006	(United States) NATC Expert	Beta	AZ; 1	AZ; 1	OK; 2	OK; 2	TN; 1	TN; 1	RI -	RI -						145	1st	
2007	(United States) NATC Expert	Beta	CO; 1	CO; 1	TN; 1	TN; 1	OH; 1	OH; 1	CA -	CA -	MN -	MN; 2				180	1st	
2008	(United States) NATC Expert	Beta	CO; 1	CO; 1	CO; 1	MN; 1	MN; 1	MN; 1								150	1st	
2009	(United States) NATC Expert	Beta	NE; 1	NE; 1	TN; 1	TN; 1	VT; 1	VT; 1	NY; 1	NY; 1						150	1st	
2010	(United States) NATC Expert	Beta	OK; 1	OK; 1	RI; 1	RI; 1	NY; 1	NY; 1	CO; 1	CO; 1	CA; 1	CA; 1				180	1st	
2011	(United States) NATC Expert	Beta	TX -	TX -	PA; 1	PA; 1	TN; 1	TN; 3	TN; 4							129	2nd	
2012	(United States) NATC Expert	Beta	CA; 1	CA; 1	CO; 1	CO; 1	OH; 1	OH; 1	RI; 1	RI; 1						150	1st	
2013	(United States) NATC Expert	Beta	NY; 1	NY; 2	VT; 1	VT; 1	AZ; 1	AZ; 1	NM; 1	NM; 1	MN; 1	MN; 1				180	1st	member of the US Trial des Nations team
2014	(United States) NATC Expert	Beta	CO; 1	CO; 2	KS; 2	KS; 1	PA; 2	PA; 2	TN; 1	TN; 1						145	1st	
2016	(United States) NATC Expert	Beta	FL; 1	FL; 1	TN -	TN -	OR -	OR -	CO -	CO -						60	9th	
2017	(United States) NATC Sr. Expert Sportsman East	Beta	OH; 1	OH; 1	RI; 1	RI; 1										90	1st	
2017	(United States) NATC Sr. Expert Sportsman West	Beta	TX; 1	TX; 1	KS; 1	KS; 1										90	1st	

== Honors ==
- US National NATC Expert Trials Champion 2004, 2005, 2006, 2007, 2008, 2009, 2010, 2012, 2013, 2014
- US National NATC Sr. Expert Sportsman East Champion 2017
- US National NATC Sr. Expert Sportsman West Champion 2017
- US National NATC High School Champion 1990
- Member of winning USA Trial des Nations team 2000
- Ute Cup winner 1995, 1996, 1997, 2020

== Related Reading ==
- NATC Trials Championship
- FIM Trial European Championship
- FIM Trial World Championship
