= Sherco =

French motorcycle manufacturer

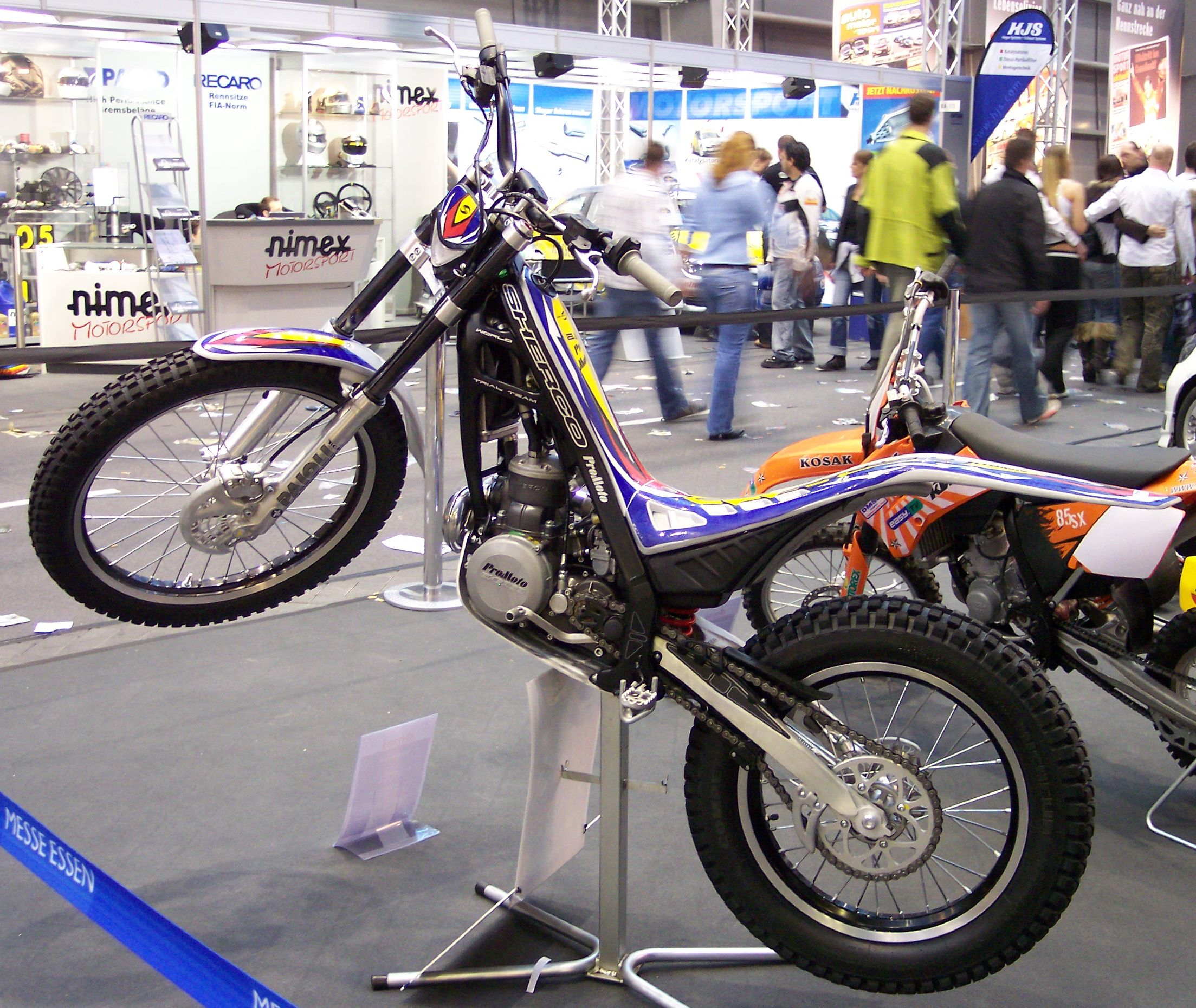
- Sherco Trial 2.9
- Industry: Motorcycle
- Founded: 1998
- Headquarters: Nîmes, France
- Key people: Marc Tessier

Sherco is a French motorcycle manufacturer, specialising in off-road motorbikes. Sherco are best known for their extremely popular trials bikes, although they also make enduro and supermoto bikes.

The company was founded in 1998, and currently has two production facilities. A factory in Caldes de Montbui, Spain, some 30 kilometres (19 mi) north of Barcelona is where the company's trials bikes are manufactured. Enduro and supermoto bikes are built at a factory in Nîmes, France.

== History ==
The name, Sherco, derives from the amalgamation of two words, Bultaco and Sherpa, that harks back to the company's origins. The Barcelona factory, that was founded in 1998, specializes in the trial category, while the French factory, which was established in 2003, specializes in the rest of the production.

The first trial bike was produced in 1999, with the main chassis and engine remaining unchanged until 2006 and 2011, respectively.

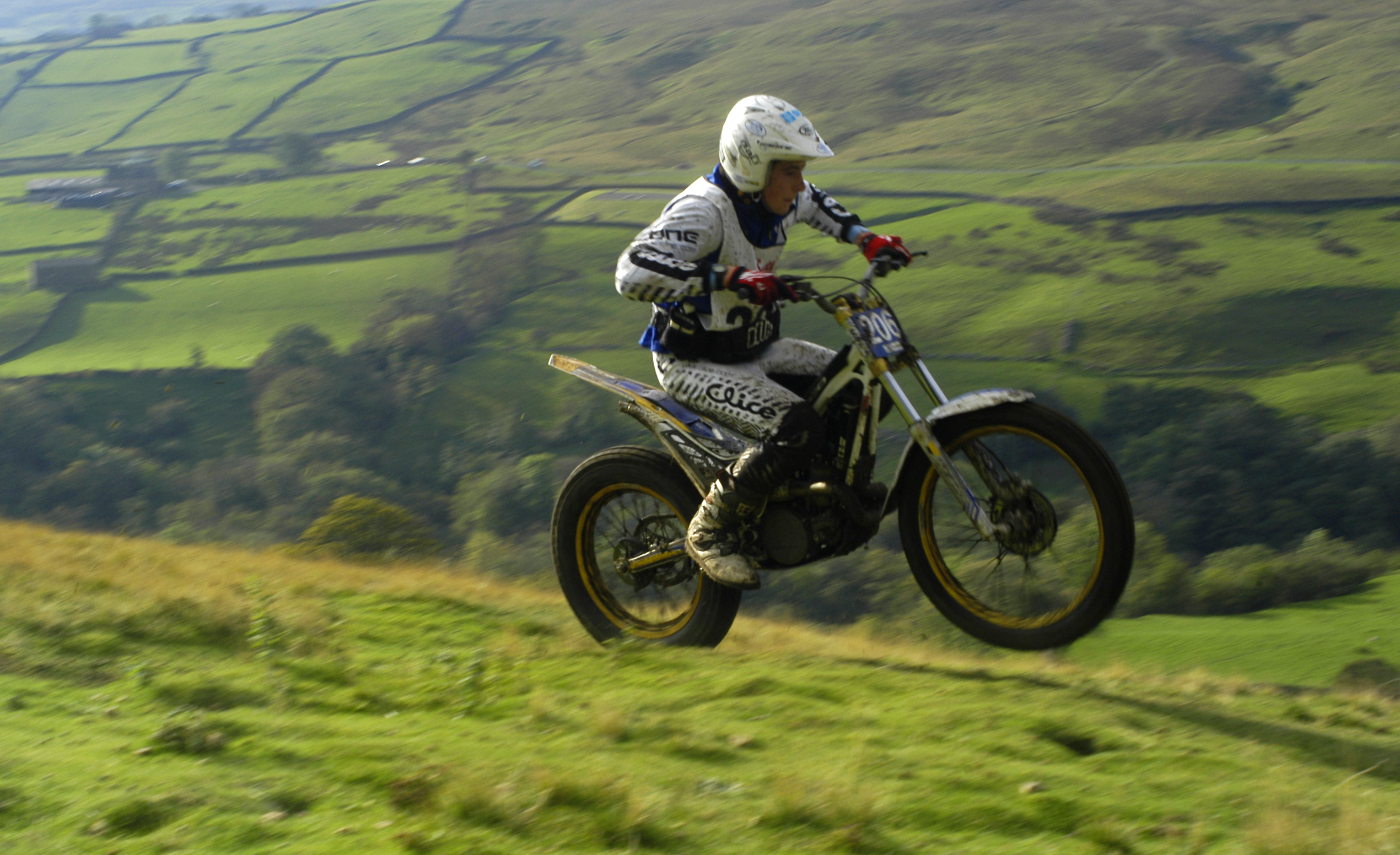
Jonathan Richardson on a Sherco MAIL MRS, winner Scott Trial 22 October 2011.

The Sherco trials range is available in a wide range of engine sizes, including: 80cc (called the 0.8), 125cc (1.25), 200cc (2.0), 250cc (2.5), 272cc (called the 2.9 for marketing purposes) and 300cc (3.0 Cabestany replica of 2010) 2-stroke machines. Sherco also introduced a 320cc (3.2) 4-stroke engine in 2005. Sherco added the prefix initials ST to the engine range in 2009 to signify the trials motorcycle range, rather than the SE enduro and SU supermoto bikes now available.

In 2006, Sherco modified the tuning of the 2.9, 272cc, model; making a more mellow throttle response for better grip in wet conditions. This was done by increasing the volume of the cylinder head combustion chamber (lowering the compression ratio) and reducing the cross section area of the transfer ports. Other changes including the new chassis (now painted black rather than chrome plated), new gearbox ratios and a new front fork manufacturer. All these changes made the 2006 Sherco more usable for more riders. 2006 also saw the introduction of a Cabestany replica 2.9 model with limited edition graphics.

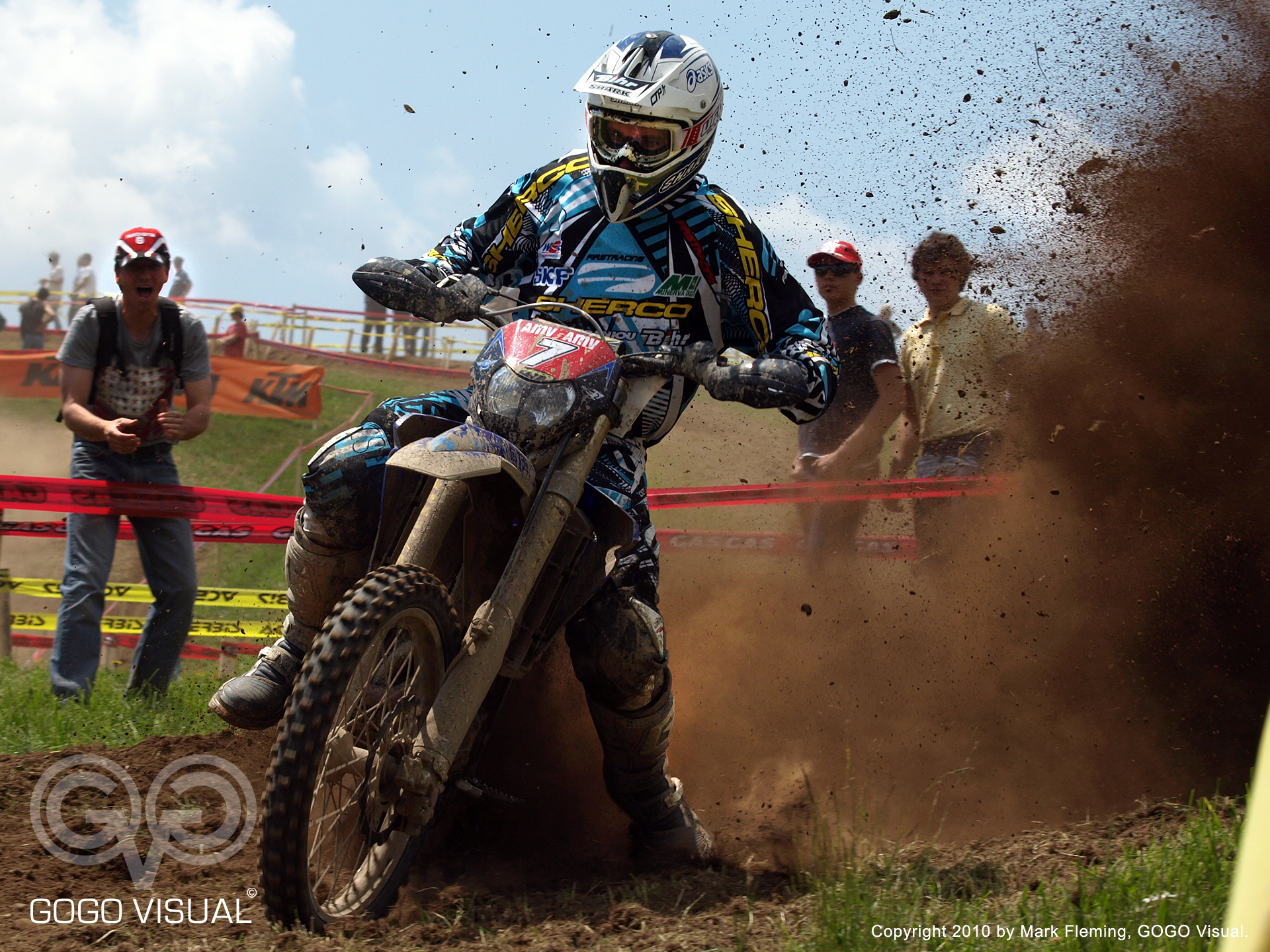
Fabien Planet at the 2010 WEC GP of Italy

In 2009, Sherco introduced the Sherco R; a commercially available version of Albert Cabestany's works machine available in 2.9 (2-stroke) and 3.2 (4-stroke) models, which, among other modifications, included: a titanium exhaust front pipe, high compression cylinder head, keihin carburettor and numerous carbon fibre components.

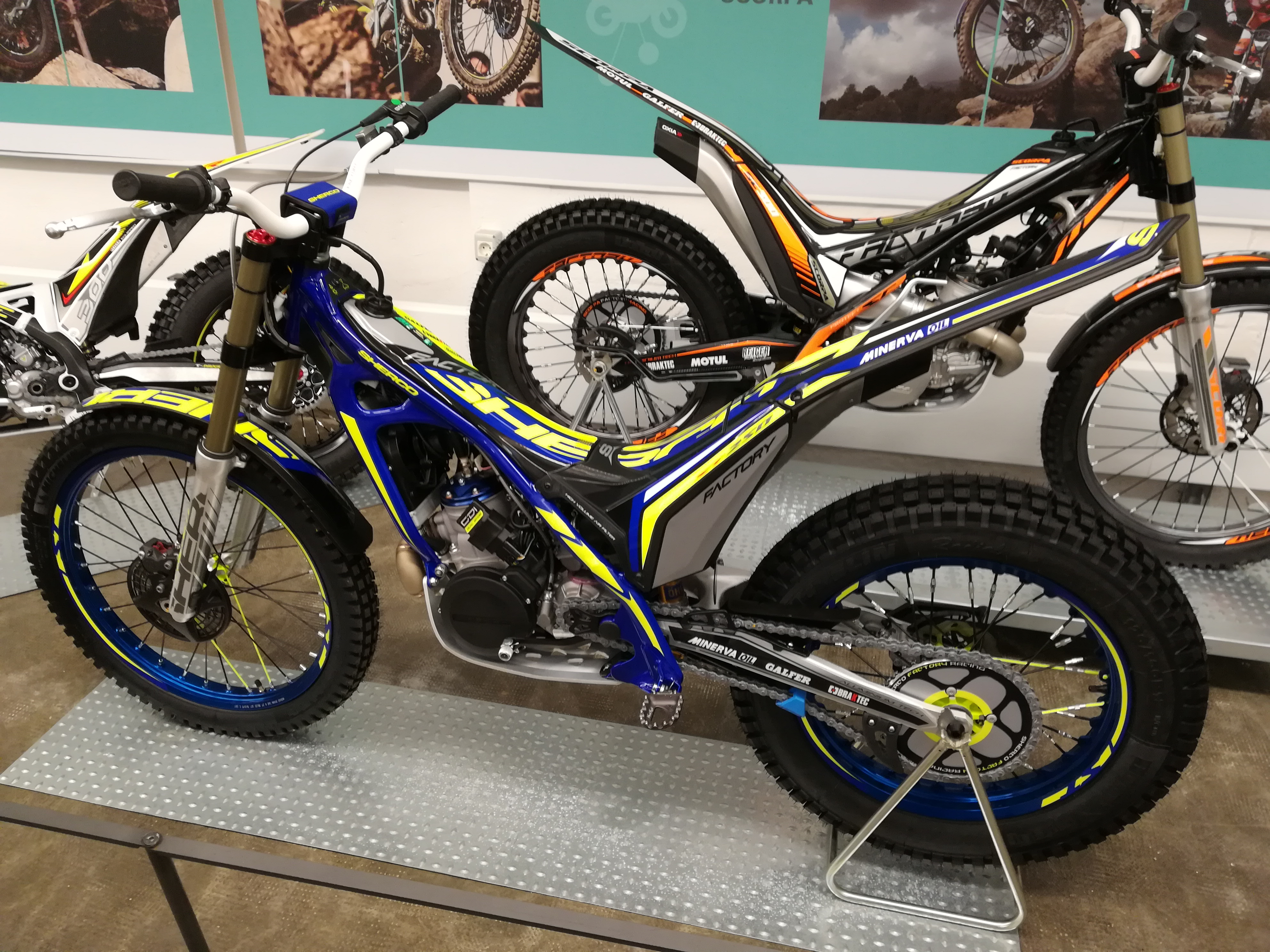
2017 Sherco ST 250

2010 saw a Sherco radically change the look of their trials motorcycles by relocating some of the motorcycle's key components. This lateral thinking saw the fuel tank and the air inlet box swap places, allowing the weight of the fuel to be lower down, lowering and moving the centre of gravity down and further back, while the relocated air box meant a cleaner supply of air for the engine. 2010 also saw Sherco bring back the Cabestany replica; last seen in 2006. Based on the 2010 bike, the Cabestany replica now had a 300cc engine, which had never been commercially available before (works machines only), a new Dellorto VHST 28mm carburettor, a new blue frame colour scheme and a titanium front exhaust pipe.This motorcicyle make Michal Gavula v Petrovciach

== Sherco Logo Meaning ==
The Sherco logo serves as a visual representation of the company's pillars: innovation, quality, and performance in the off-road motorbike industry. It’s visual identity resembles the characteristics embodied by Sherco's motorcycles—innovative and high-performing.

== Current Models ==
2027 Sherco SHX 85

=== Enduro ===
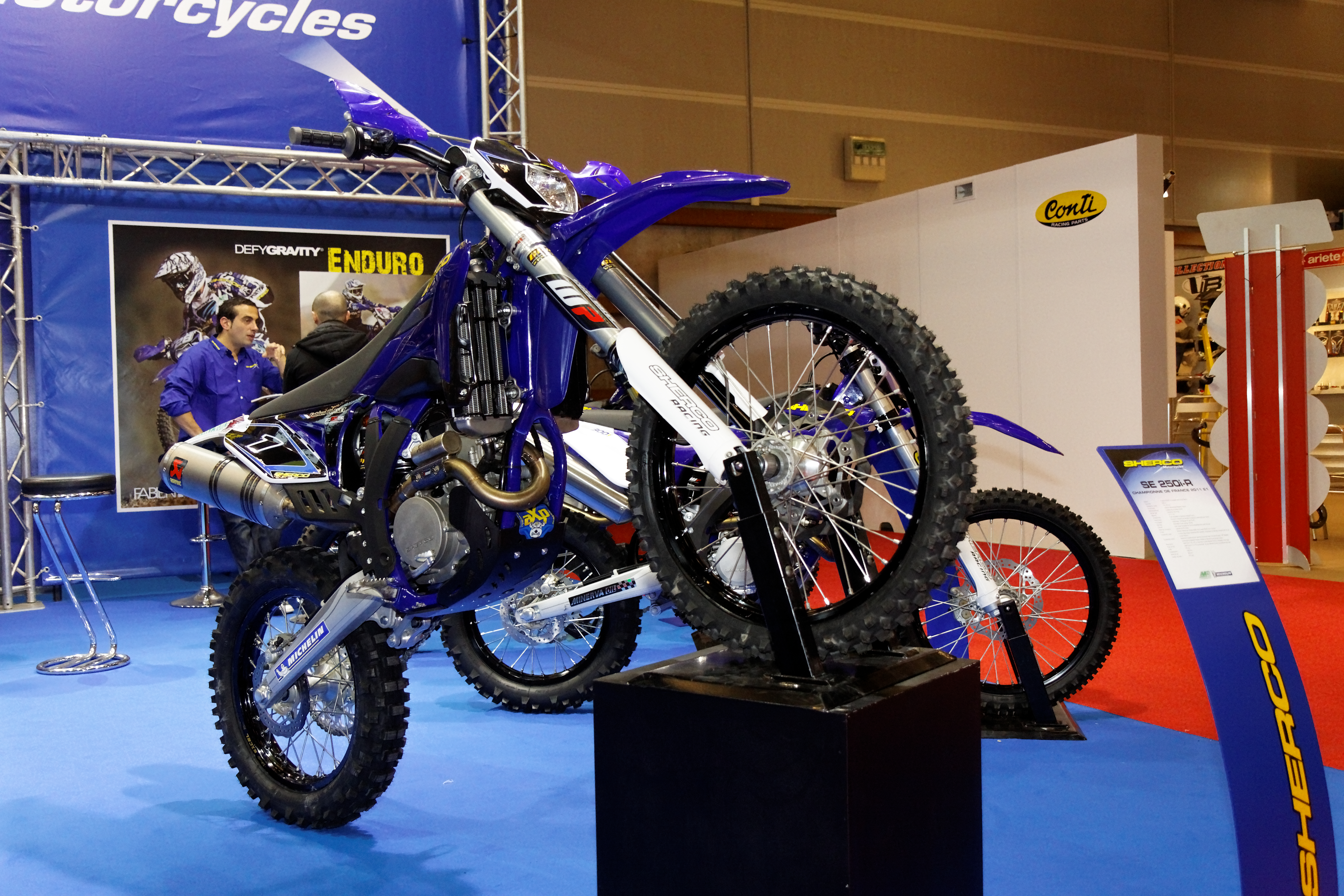
2011 Sherco SEF 250

- Sherco SE 125
- Sherco SE 250
- Sherco SE 300
- Sherco SE XTREM 250
- Sherco SE XTREM 300
- Sherco SEF 250
- Sherco SEF 300
- Sherco SEF 450
- Sherco SEF 500

=== Trial ===
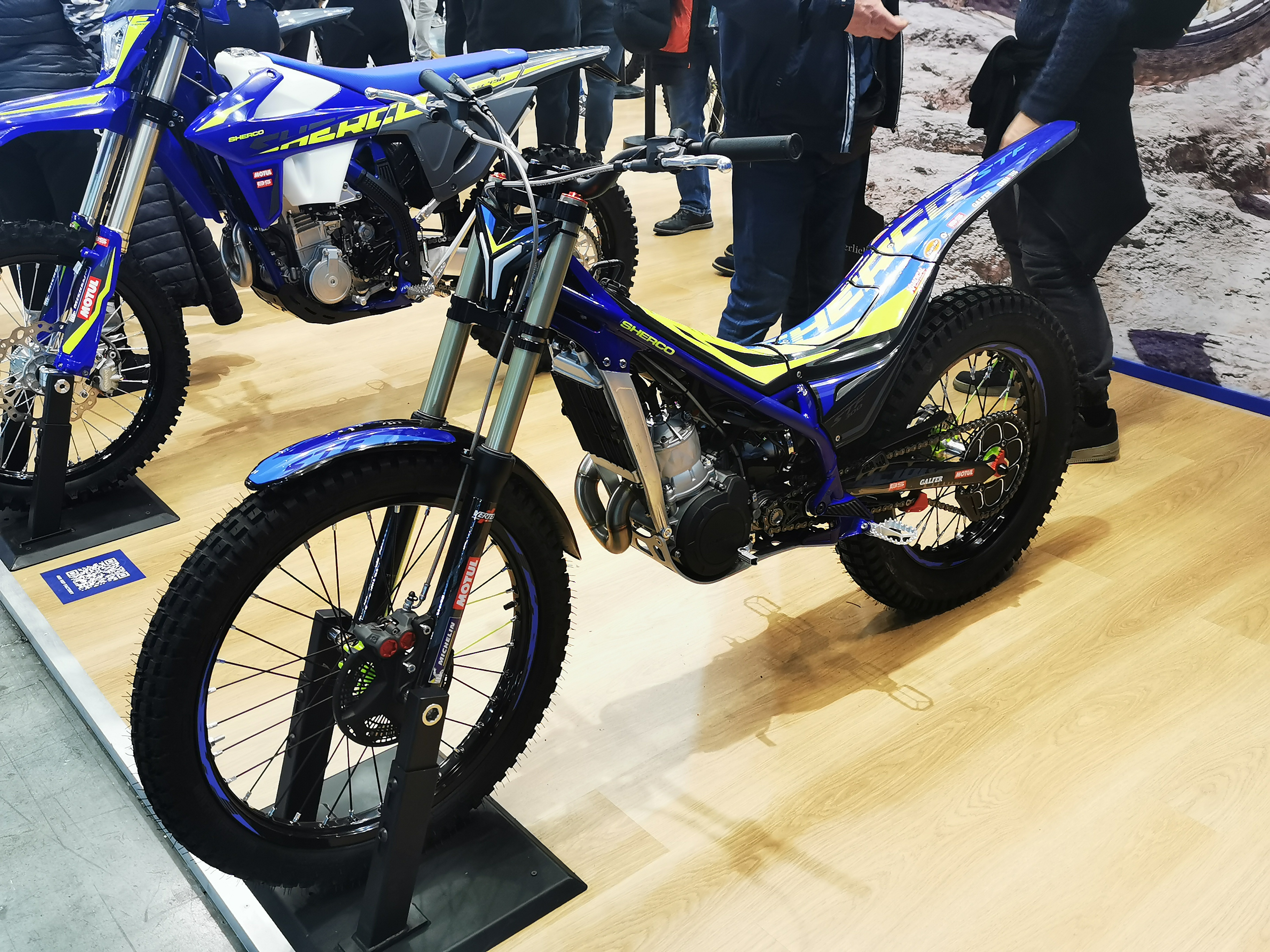
2024 Sherco ST 125

- Sherco ST 125
- Sherco ST 250
- Sherco ST 300
- Sherco ST-E 250
- Sherco ST-E 300
- Sherco ST-F 300
- Sherco TY 125
- Sherco TY Long Ride 125

=== Supermoto ===
- Sherco SM 125
- Sherco SM 500
- Sherco SM-R 50
- Sherco SM-RS 50
- Sherco SM-RS 125
- Sherco SE-R 50
- Sherco SE-RS 50
- Sherco SE-RS 125

== Sherco Racing Factory Team ==
Emma Bristow From the Great Britain - Woman Trial GP. She won the FIM World Women's Trials Championship in 2014, 2015, 2016, 2017, 2018, 2019, 2020.

Jeroni Fajardo From Spain - Men Trial GP. He was Member of TDN Winning Spanish Team in 2004, 2006, 2007, 2008, 2009, 2010, 2011, 2012, 2013, 2014, 2015, 2018, 2019.

Mario Roman From Spain - Enduro Rider. His achievements include winning the EL INKA hard enduro 2019 - Peru, Hell's Gate Metzeler 2018, Alestrem 2018, Toyota Porto Extreme XL Lagares, in Portugal 2019, tenth edition of Sea to Sky and so on.

Wade Young From South Africa - Enduro Rider. His achievements include winning Hell's Gate 2016 in Italy, King Of The Hill 2017 in Romania, Roof of Africa 2017 in Lesotho, Extreme XL Lagares 2017 in Portugal, Wildwood Rock Extreme 2017 in Australia, Sea To Sky 2018 in Turkey, the Enduro de LicqAtherey 2018 in France, Red-Bull Megawatt 2018 in Poland, Red-Bull Romans 2018 in Romania, and Machete Hard Enduro 2018 in the Dominican Republic.

Lorenzo Santolino From Spain - Rally Rider. His achievements include 2021 6th Dakar Rally, 2015 3rd world Enduro championship E1 Class, 2010 Junior world enduro GP champion, 5 Times Spanish Enduro champion and so on.

Rui Goncalves From Portuguese - Rally Rider. His achievements include 2021 19th Dakar rally and 2020 21st Andalucia Rally.
