= 2023 New Zealand Motocross Championship =

New Zealand Motocross Competition in 2023

The 2023 New Zealand Motocross Championship season was the 49th New Zealand Motocross Championship season.

The series had four rounds across the country, running from early February to late March. This was the first championship since 2021, as the previous year's competition was cancelled due to the COVID-19 pandemic.

Hamish Harwood was the reigning champion in the MX1 category, after taking his fifth national title in 2021. However, he would eventually finish as runner-up to Maximus Purvis, who took his first MX1 national title. In the MX2 class, Cody Cooper won his tenth senior national title overall, after dropping back into the class for 2023.

The third round of the championship was originally scheduled to take place at the Hawke's Bay track. Following Cyclone Gabrielle, the round had to be cancelled with the final round at Taupō being converted into a double-header in its place.

== Race calendar and results ==
=== MX1 ===
Round	Date	Location	Race 1 Winner	Race 2 Winner	Race 3 Winner	Round Winner
1	12 February	Balclutha	(New Zealand) Hamish Harwood	(New Zealand) Hamish Harwood	(New Zealand) Maximus Purvis	(New Zealand) Hamish Harwood
2	26 February	Rotorua	(New Zealand) Cody Cooper	(New Zealand) Maximus Purvis	(New Zealand) Maximus Purvis	(New Zealand) Maximus Purvis
3	25 March	Taupō	(New Zealand) Maximus Purvis	(New Zealand) Hamish Harwood	(New Zealand) Maximus Purvis	(New Zealand) Maximus Purvis
4	26 March	Taupō	(New Zealand) Maximus Purvis	(New Zealand) Maximus Purvis	No Third Race	(New Zealand) Maximus Purvis

=== MX2 ===
Round	Date	Location	Race 1 Winner	Race 2 Winner	Race 3 Winner	Round Winner
1	12 February	Balclutha	(New Zealand) Cody Cooper	(New Zealand) Cody Cooper	(New Zealand) Cody Cooper	(New Zealand) Cody Cooper
2	26 February	Rotorua	(New Zealand) Cody Cooper	(New Zealand) Hayden Smith	(New Zealand) Cody Cooper	(New Zealand) Cody Cooper
3	25 March	Taupō	(New Zealand) Cody Cooper	(New Zealand) Hayden Smith	(New Zealand) Cody Cooper	(New Zealand) Cody Cooper
4	26 March	Taupō	(New Zealand) James Scott	(New Zealand) Hayden Smith	No Third Race	(New Zealand) Hayden Smith

=== Circuit locations ===
2023 New Zealand Motocross Championship locations

== MX1 ==
=== Participants ===
Team	Constructor	No	Rider	Rounds
Filco Farm & Sport	Kawasaki	0	(New Zealand) Jared Guthrie	All
CML KTM	KTM	1	(New Zealand) Hamish Harwood	All
Honda Motul Racing New Zealand	Honda	5	(New Zealand) Tyler Steiner	All
Honda Motul Racing New Zealand	Honda	94	(New Zealand) Kayne Lamont	All
Honda Motul Racing New Zealand	Honda	M	(Austria) Michael Kratzer	All
CML Gas Gas	Gas Gas	16	(New Zealand) Hayden Smith	All
Honda Hub	Honda	18	(New Zealand) Zak Hetherington	2
NMC	KTM	23	(New Zealand) Nic D'Arcy	All
Pumps & Filters/Raglan Roast Factory Yamaha	Yamaha	24	(New Zealand) Liam Hutton	All
Bike Torque Taumaranui	Gas Gas	35	(New Zealand) Bradley Watling	All
Altherm JCR Yamaha	Yamaha	44	(New Zealand) Maximus Purvis	All
Pro Earthworks	Kawasaki	49	(New Zealand) Josh de Reus	All
Murray Thorn Motorcycles	Yamaha	52	(New Zealand) Ethan Waters	All
Artisans Roofing	KTM	64	(New Zealand) Isaiah McGoldrick	1
Kea Trailers/Whitespowersport	Kawasaki	66	(New Zealand) Seton Head	1–2
Powerzone Motorcycles	Kawasaki	67	(New Zealand) Madison Latta	All
Mahana Earthworks	Yamaha	81	(New Zealand) Hayden Wilkinson	All
Bridgestone Kawasaki Race Team	Kawasaki	121	(New Zealand) Cody Cooper	All
Bridgestone Kawasaki Race Team	Kawasaki	146	(New Zealand) Micah McGoldrick	1
	Yamaha	149	(New Zealand) Max Singleton	3–4
Hydro Power	KTM	151	(New Zealand) Jayden McAloon	3–4
Mac Media	Yamaha	157	(New Zealand) Logan Maddren	2
	Yamaha	158	(New Zealand) Kaleb Livesey	2–4
Holeshot MX	Yamaha	164	(New Zealand) Reece McBride	1
Team Tortoise Racing	Honda	262	(New Zealand) Blake Ditchfield	1
Whyteline Paeroa/Groombridge Refrigeration	Kawasaki	338	(New Zealand) Brad Groombridge	All
City Honda	Honda	393	(New Zealand) Toby Winiata	All
Bike Torque Taumarunui	Kawasaki	394	(New Zealand) Richard Horne	2
Brausch Contacting Ltd.	Yamaha	445	(New Zealand) Brooke Brausch	2–4
Otoro Honda Crownkiwi	Honda	491	(New Zealand) Sam Cuthbertson	1–3
Timaru Honda	Honda	722	(New Zealand) Josh May	1
City Honda	Honda	933	(New Zealand) Jesse Donnelly	2
Lakes Honda	Honda	997	(New Zealand) Hadley Dodunski	2

=== Riders Championship ===
Points are awarded to finishers of the main races, in the following format:

Position	1st	2nd	3rd	4th	5th	6th	7th	8th	9th	10th	11th	12th	13th	14th	15th	16th	17th	18th	19th	20th
Points	25	22	20	18	16	15	14	13	12	11	10	9	8	7	6	5	4	3	2	1

Pos	Rider	Bike	BAL			ROT			TAU			TAU		Points
1	(New Zealand) Maximus Purvis	Yamaha	3	2	1	2	1	1	1	2	1	1	1	261
2	(New Zealand) Hamish Harwood	KTM	1	1	2	3	2	6	7	1	2	8	2	225
3	(New Zealand) Cody Cooper	Kawasaki	2	3	3	1	3	3	2	6	7	5	5	210
4	(Austria) Michael Kratzer	Honda	4	4	4	4	4	4	5	7	4	3	4	194
5	(New Zealand) Brad Groombridge	Kawasaki	8	6	8	6	5	5	6	3	3	2	3	185
6	(New Zealand) Hayden Smith	Gas Gas	5	8	6	8	7	7	3	4	6	6	6	168
7	(New Zealand) Kayne Lamont	Honda	7	5	5	5	6	2	4	5	5	7	DNS	163
8	(New Zealand) Tyler Steiner	Honda	6	9	7	7	8	11	8	Ret	10	4	8	133
9	(New Zealand) Madison Latta	Kawasaki	13	10	13	9	12	10	10	8	8	Ret	7	110
10	(New Zealand) Ethan Waters	Yamaha	14	11	12	13	19	13	13	11	12	9	12	92
11	(New Zealand) Nic D'Arcy	KTM	16	12	14	17	14	9	14	13	9	11	17	85
12	(New Zealand) Sam Cuthbertson	Honda	10	7	9	11	9	8	9	Ret	DNS			84
13	(New Zealand) Jared Guthrie	Kawasaki	11	20	10	14	10	Ret	17	10	13	13	9	83
14	(New Zealand) Toby Winiata	Honda	19	15	15	19	16	16	12	9	11	10	10	79
15	(New Zealand) Bradley Watling	Gas Gas	12	14	11	18	15	14	11	12	18	14	DNS	71
16	(New Zealand) Hayden Wilkinson	Yamaha	22	19	Ret	16	17	15	16	14	14	12	11	55
17	(New Zealand) Kaleb Livesey	Yamaha				20	18	18	15	16	16	17	14	34
18	(New Zealand) Josh de Reus	Kawasaki	20	18	16	21	21	17	18	15	15	15	Ret	34
19	(New Zealand) Jesse Donnelly	Honda				10	11	12						30
20	(New Zealand) Liam Hutton	Yamaha	23	17	18	22	23	20	20	17	19	19	16	22
21	(New Zealand) Richard Horne	Kawasaki				12	13	Ret						17
22	(New Zealand) Max Singleton	Yamaha							Ret	Ret	17	16	13	17
23	(New Zealand) Jayden McAloon	KTM							19	19	20	18	15	14
24	(New Zealand) Micah McGoldrick	Kawasaki	9	Ret	DNS									12
25	(New Zealand) Seton Head	Kawasaki	21	13	17	Ret	Ret	DNS						12
26	(New Zealand) Blake Ditchfield	Honda	18	16	19									10
27	(New Zealand) Hadley Dodunski	Honda				15	22	21						6
28	(New Zealand) Isaiah McGoldrick	KTM	15	Ret	DNS									6
29	(New Zealand) Josh May	Honda	17	Ret	DNS									4
30	(New Zealand) Brooke Brausch	Yamaha				Ret	25	DNS	21	18	21	20	DNS	4
31	(New Zealand) Logan Maddren	Yamaha				24	20	19						3
	(New Zealand) Zak Hetherington	Honda				23	24	DNS						0
	(New Zealand) Reece McBride	Yamaha	24	Ret	Ret									0
Pos	Rider	Bike	BAL			ROT			TAU			TAU		Points

== MX2 ==
=== Participants ===
Team	Constructor	No	Rider	Rounds
CML Gas Gas	Gas Gas	3	(New Zealand) Hayden Smith	All
CML Gas Gas	Gas Gas	20	(New Zealand) Logan Denize	1–2
JCR Murray Thorn Yamaha	Yamaha	12	(New Zealand) James Barnett	All
Honda Motul Racing New Zealand	Honda	14	(New Zealand) Cobie Bourke	All
Hamburger Transport	Kawasaki	17	(New Zealand) Bradley Hamburger	1
LMC Husqvarna	Husqvarna	18	(New Zealand) Joshua Jack	All
Uplift Construction	Yamaha	21	(New Zealand) Trent Garland	1
Pro Circuit Kawasaki Race Team	Kawasaki	22	(New Zealand) Flynn Watts	All
Pro Circuit Kawasaki Race Team	Kawasaki	144	(New Zealand) Tyler Brown	All
Bob McCleary Yamaha	Yamaha	23	(New Zealand) Marshall Phillips	All
Bisset Honda	Honda	29	(New Zealand) Sam Blundell	All
Transcanada Motorsports	Kawasaki	31	(Canada) Matthew Stokes	2
	Yamaha	32	(New Zealand) James Rountree	All
Best Build Construction	KTM	41	(New Zealand) Curtis King	All
Glass and Window Solutions	Husqvarna	43	(New Zealand) Luke Heaphy	All
	KTM	51	(New Zealand) Ryan Harris	1
Gisler Moto Technic	Gas Gas	54	(New Zealand) Kurt Patten	1–2
Vertex Lubricants	Yamaha	72	(New Zealand) Seth Thompson	2–4
McKendry Mazda	Yamaha	74	(New Zealand) Toby McKendry	1, 3
Level Ltd/Pirelli Tyres NZ	Yamaha	81	(New Zealand) Donovan Ward	All
Jeff Scott Electrical/Treloar Farms	KTM	93	(New Zealand) Jack Treloar	All
Trimax Logging	KTM	95	(New Zealand) Fletcher Saunders	2
JNS Ltd/Patterson O'Connor	Kawasaki	99	(New Zealand) Hunter Steens	All
Altherm JCR Yamaha	Yamaha	108	(New Zealand) James Scott	All
	KTM	110	(New Zealand) Rian King	All
MTF Finance Nelson	Yamaha	115	(New Zealand) Liam Kerr	All
Bridgestone Kawasaki Race Team	Kawasaki	121	(New Zealand) Cody Cooper	All
Bridgestone Kawasaki Race Team	Kawasaki	203	(New Zealand) Luka Freemantle	All
Hydro Power	KTM	151	(New Zealand) Jayden McAloon	2
	KTM	163	(New Zealand) Ryan Crawford	1
Action Moto	Kawasaki	179	(New Zealand) Davi Jordan	All
John Newton Panel & Paint	Yamaha	210	(New Zealand) Joshua Bourke-Palmer	2–3
SK Electrical & Contracting	Yamaha	215	(New Zealand) Mitchell Kiernan	2
	Yamaha	225	(New Zealand) Luke van der Lee	2
Wanaka Powersports	Gas Gas	228	(New Zealand) Jordan Newell	1–2
MGB Logging/Keown Honda	Honda	246	(New Zealand) Hunter Gilbertson	2–4
Rae Emerson Motorsport	KTM	278	(New Zealand) Yanni Emerson-Rae	2–4
CML KTM	KTM	318	(New Zealand) Madoc Dixon	All
Formation Earthworks	Honda	333	(New Zealand) William McLachlan	All
AFC Motorcycles	KTM	411	(New Zealand) Seth Henson	3
Bob McCleary Yamaha	Yamaha	509	(New Zealand) Sam McPherson	1
CNC Profile Cutting Services	Yamaha	554	(New Zealand) Oliver Ayre	All
Whangarei Yamaha	Yamaha	809	(New Zealand) Tyler Cooksley	1–3
Murray Thorn Yamaha	Yamaha	904	(New Zealand) Conrad Fell	1
The Tyre General Yamaha	Yamaha	912	(New Zealand) Tommy Watts	3–4
Blackwood Yamaha	Yamaha	972	(New Zealand) Carlin Hedley	All
Phils Motorcycles	Yamaha	982	(New Zealand) Aaron Manning	2

=== Riders Championship ===
Points are awarded to finishers of the main races, in the following format:

Position	1st	2nd	3rd	4th	5th	6th	7th	8th	9th	10th	11th	12th	13th	14th	15th	16th	17th	18th	19th	20th
Points	25	22	20	18	16	15	14	13	12	11	10	9	8	7	6	5	4	3	2	1

Pos	Rider	Bike	BAL			ROT			TAU			TAU		Points
1	(New Zealand) Cody Cooper	Kawasaki	1	1	1	1	3	1	1	3	1	5	DNS	231
2	(New Zealand) Hayden Smith	Gas Gas	3	3	3	4	1	3	2	1	5	3	1	227
3	(New Zealand) James Scott	Yamaha	5	4	2	2	2	4	3	8	2	1	3	220
4	(New Zealand) Madoc Dixon	KTM	2	5	7	3	4	2	4	2	7	4	2	206
5	(New Zealand) Cobie Bourke	Honda	4	2	4	5	8	22	5	4	6	8	5	167
6	(New Zealand) Joshua Jack	Husqvarna	8	6	8	9	10	5	10	10	10	10	8	137
7	(New Zealand) Rian King	KTM	13	9	6	10	5	7	7	14	9	9	7	135
8	(New Zealand) Sam Blundell	Honda	11	7	15	7	7	8	6	9	12	11	6	132
9	(New Zealand) Jack Treloar	KTM	6	17	5	5	9	Ret	Ret	5	3	7	4	130
10	(New Zealand) Oliver Ayre	Yamaha	12	11	19	8	6	9	Ret	6	8	2	11	121
11	(New Zealand) Flynn Watts	Kawasaki	7	Ret	9	17	11	6	8	7	11	12	9	113
12	(New Zealand) Tyler Brown	Kawasaki	10	15	10	13	14	13	13	12	13	13	10	95
13	(New Zealand) Davi Jordan	Kawasaki	19	16	11	26	12	12	14	13	15	14	17	67
14	(New Zealand) Tommy Watts	Yamaha							9	11	4	6	12	64
15	(New Zealand) Luka Freemantle	Kawasaki	14	8	13	11	Ret	DNS	20	15	Ret	19	18	50
16	(New Zealand) Carlin Hedley	Yamaha	16	12	14	16	13	10	Ret	22	21	DNS	DNS	45
17	(New Zealand) Marshall Phillips	Yamaha	15	10	12	15	29	24	21	19	16	17	21	43
18	(New Zealand) James Rountree	Yamaha	Ret	18	17	22	25	11	16	17	17	18	16	38
19	(New Zealand) Seth Thompson	Yamaha				14	Ret	21	12	16	14	22	15	34
20	(New Zealand) Curtis King	KTM	Ret	20	Ret	12	17	14	15	Ret	Ret	15	Ret	33
21	(New Zealand) James Barnett	Yamaha	23	21	21	25	18	16	17	23	19	16	13	27
22	(New Zealand) Tyler Cooksley	Yamaha	18	14	16	23	15	18	22	Ret	Ret			24
23	(New Zealand) Luke Heaphy	Husqvarna	21	13	18	24	22	19	24	27	22	20	14	21
24	(New Zealand) Donovan Ward	Yamaha	32	DNS	DNS	19	21	15	11	21	23	21	DNS	18
25	(New Zealand) Joshua Bourke-Palmer	Yamaha				28	19	17	18	18	26			12
26	(New Zealand) Logan Denize	Gas Gas	9	Ret	24	21	32	25						12
27	(New Zealand) Hunter Steens	Kawasaki	25	23	22	27	23	Ret	19	20	18	23	19	8
28	(New Zealand) Aaron Manning	Yamaha				20	16	23						6
29	(New Zealand) Jordan Newell	Gas Gas	17	22	Ret	31	26	27						4
30	(New Zealand) Ryan Harris	KTM	20	19	20									4
31	(New Zealand) Luke van der Lee	Yamaha				18	33	DNS						3
32	(Canada) Matthew Stokes	Kawasaki				Ret	20	20						2
33	(New Zealand) Yanni Emerson-Rae	KTM				35	24	26	26	24	24	24	20	1
34	(New Zealand) Seth Henson	KTM							23	Ret	20			1
	(New Zealand) Trent Garland	Yamaha	22	24	23									0
	(New Zealand) William McLachlan	Honda	26	26	26	32	27	31	25	25	25	25	22	0
	(New Zealand) Liam Kerr	Yamaha	24	25	28	30	31	29	27	26	27	27	23	0
	(New Zealand) Bradley Hamburger	Kawasaki	27	27	25									0
	(New Zealand) Hunter Gilbertson	Honda				36	Ret	32	28	28	Ret	26	Ret	0
	(New Zealand) Kurt Patten	Gas Gas	30	29	27	34	30	30						0
	(New Zealand) Toby McKendry	Yamaha	28	28	31				29	Ret	Ret			0
	(New Zealand) Jayden McAloon	KTM				29	28	28						0
	(New Zealand) Ryan Crawford	KTM	33	30	29									0
	(New Zealand) Conrad Fell	Yamaha	29	DNS	DNS									0
	(New Zealand) Sam McPherson	Yamaha	31	31	30									0
	(New Zealand) Fletcher Saunders	KTM				33	DNS	DNS						0
	(New Zealand) Mitchell Kiernan	Yamaha				Ret	DNS	DNS						0
Pos	Rider	Bike	BAL			ROT			TAU			TAU		Points
