= GasGas EC =

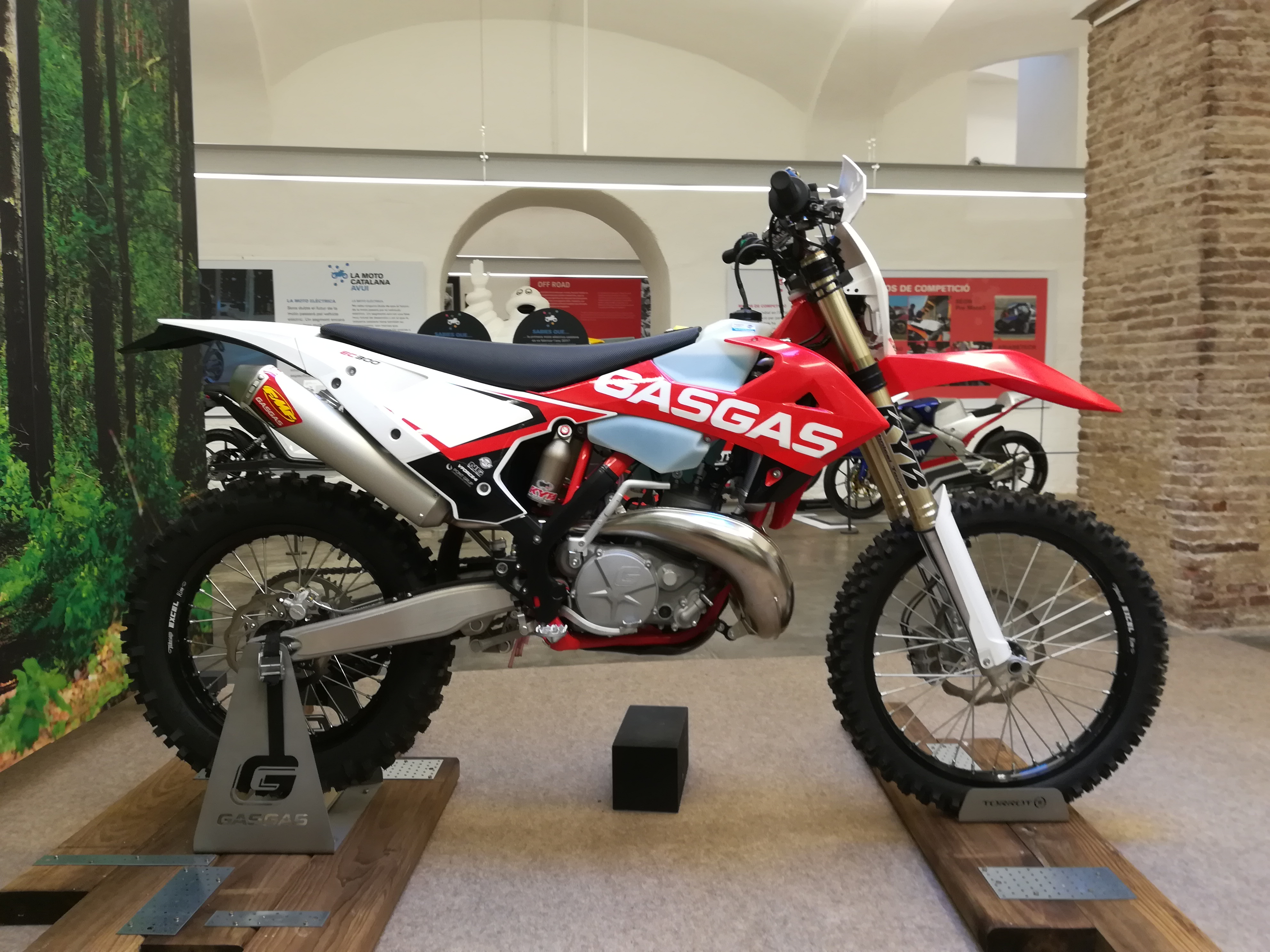
- 2017 GasGas EC 300
- Manufacturer: Gas Gas
- Production: 1989-

The GasGas EC, also known as Enducross, is a series enduro motorcycles manufactured by GasGas since 1989. It is currently marketed with two different engines: on the one hand, with the traditional engine of two-stroke in various displacements (from 80 to 300 cc) and the other, with a four-stroke engine (in which case the bike is called EC-FSE, or EC-F).these bikes are well known for having inferior suspension it's ktm cousin. Once being described as unrideable.

== Racing results ==
The EC is one of today's most successful enduro bikes and, for years, it has been ridden in competition by the best riders. So far, Paul Edmondson (in the 125cc category in 1994 and in the 250cc category in 1996), Petteri Silván (in the 250cc category and the absolute in 1999) have won world championships and Petri Pohjamo (in the 125cc category in 2003), Cristóbal Guerrero in the EJ category in 2005, Ludivine Puy in the women's category in 2010 and 2011 and Laia Sanz, also in the women's category in 2012.

== Versions ==
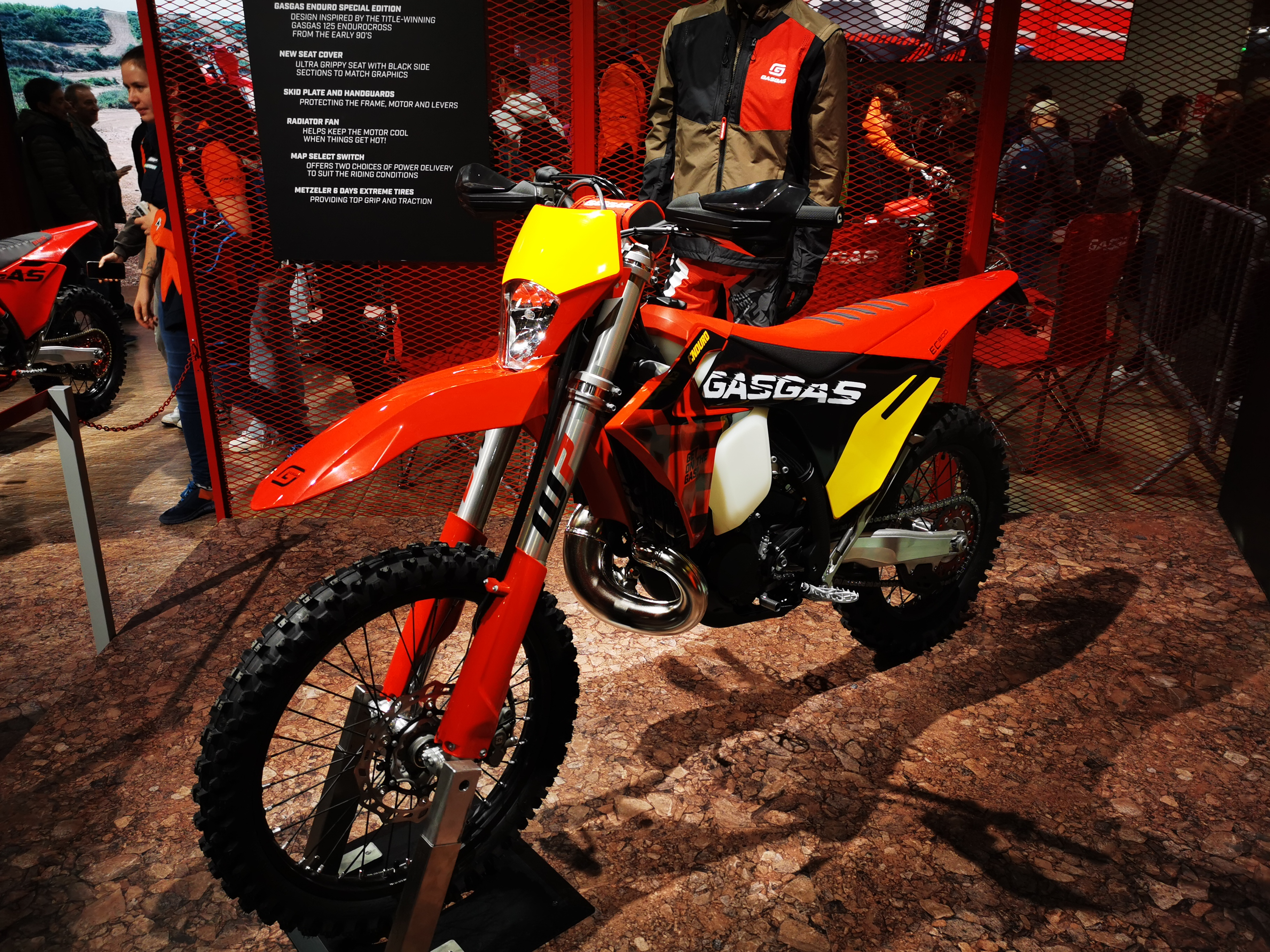
2024 Gas Gas EC 300

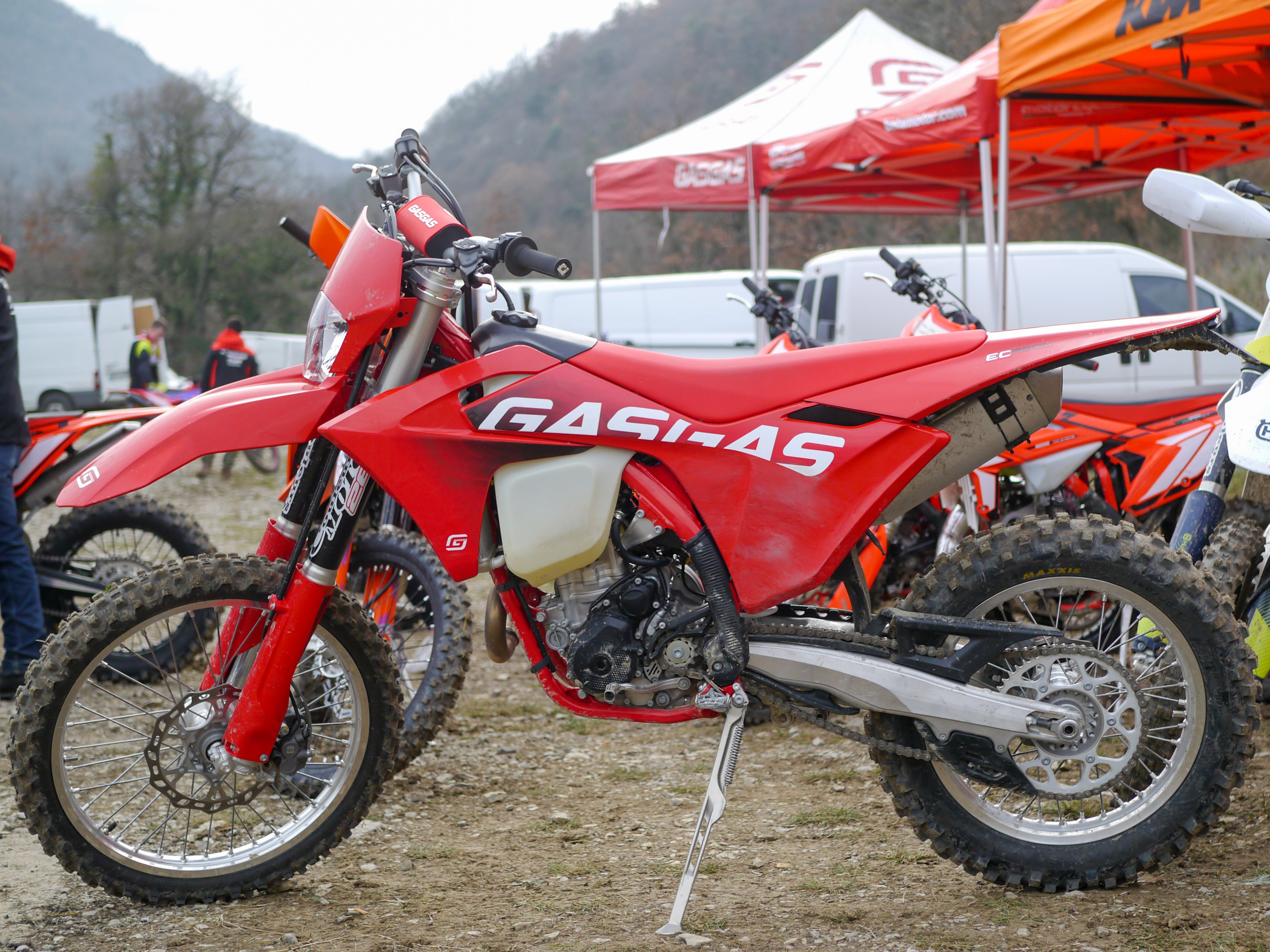
2024 Gas Gas EC 250F

=== EC (2-stroke) ===
cc	Years	Name
50	2001 – 2006	EC 50
80	1993 – 1994	EC 80
125	1989 – present	EC 125
200	1989 – 2019	EC 200
250	1989 – present	EC 250
300	1989 – present	EC 300

Starting in 2021 the EC 300 was manufactured by KTM's parent company.

=== EC-F (4-stroke) ===
cc	Years	Name
250	2021 – present	EC 250F
350	2021 – present	EC 350F
450	2024 – present	EC 450F
500	2024 – present	EC 500F
