= GasGas =

Spanish motorcycle manufacturer

GasGas Motorcycles
- Industry: Motorcycles
- Founded: 1985; 41 years ago in Salt, Girona, Catalonia, Spain
- Founder: Narcìs Casas and Josep Pibernat
- Owner: Bajaj Auto
- Website: www.gasgas.com

GasGas is a Spanish motorcycle and bicycle manufacturer specializing in off-road and trial bikes. The company was founded in 1985 in Salt, Girona, Catalonia, Spain, by Narcìs Casas and Josep Pibernat after the closure of the original Bultaco factory, where they previously worked. It is owned by India's Bajaj Auto through KTM AG.

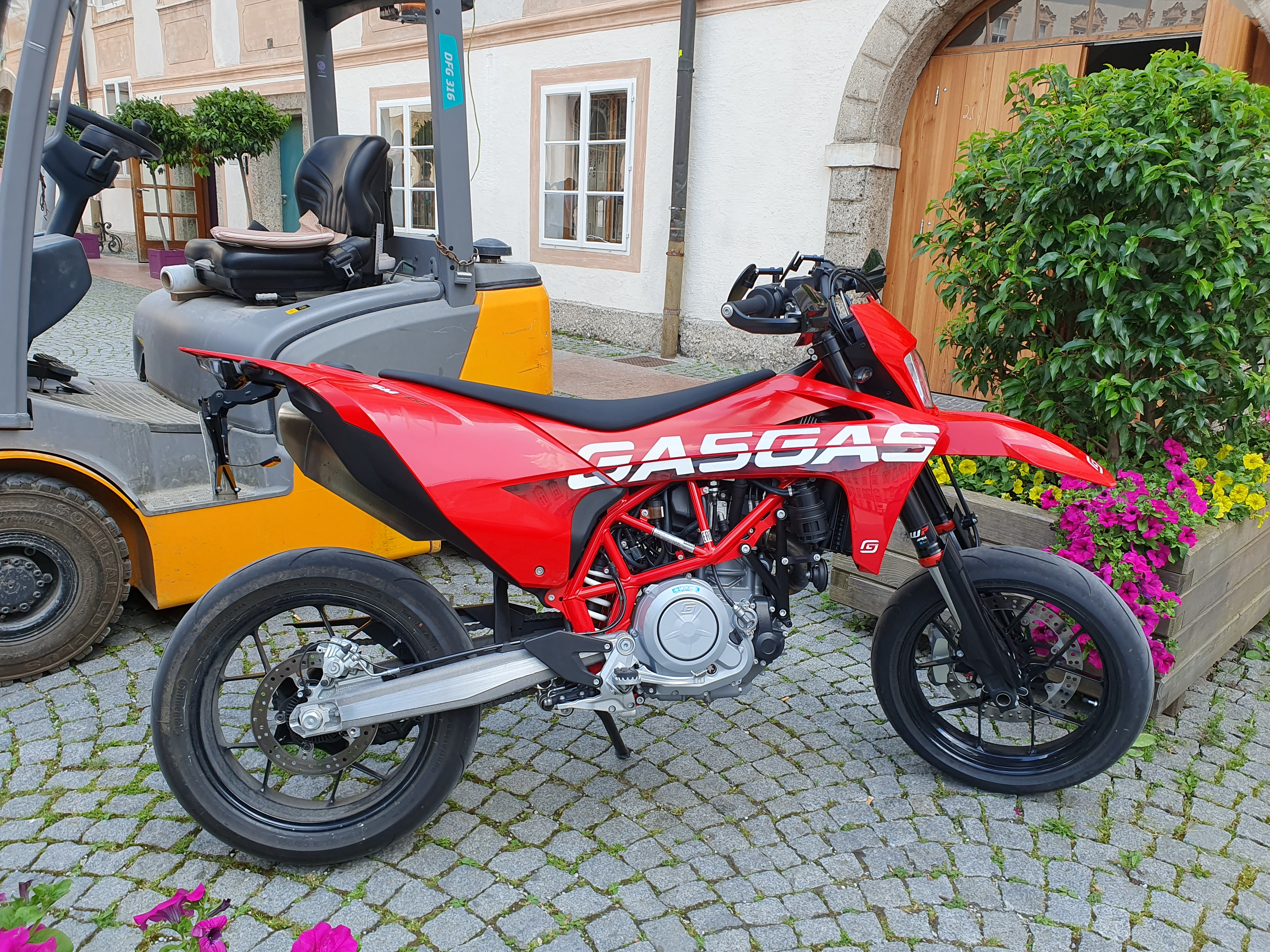
GasGas SM 700

== History ==
=== Early years ===
GasGas was established to focus on trial motorcycles and to take advantage of the local culture of motorcycle trials in Catalonia. The first models, such as the Halley, helped GasGas gain a foothold in the trial market. The brand expanded its product line to include enduro and motocross bikes.

=== Expansion and success ===
Throughout the 1990s and early 2000s, GasGas expanded in the off-road market. The company's trial bikes achieved competitive success, with world championships won by riders such as Jordi Tarrés and Adam Raga.

=== Financial difficulties and acquisitions ===
GasGas faced financial difficulties in the 2010s, leading to insolvency in 2015. In 2019, Austrian motorcycle manufacturer KTM, a part of Bajaj Auto, acquired a significant stake in GasGas. This acquisition brought financial stability and resources, allowing GasGas to expand its product offerings and integrate KTM's advanced technologies and manufacturing capabilities.

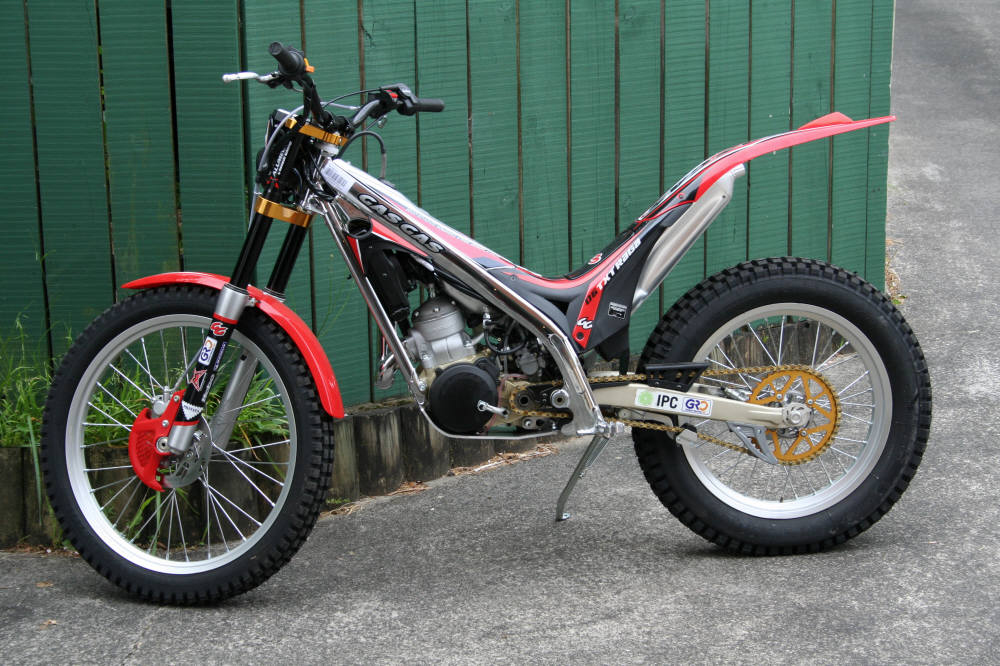
2006 Gas Gas Raga edition trials bike

In 2020, Rieju acquired the Gas Gas off-road platform, continuing production of the enduro models under the Rieju "MR" name.

== Importing ==
GasGas bikes are currently imported into many countries in Europe and around the world, including Australia, New Zealand, Canada, South America, South Africa and the United States.

== Product line ==
=== Enduro motorcycles ===
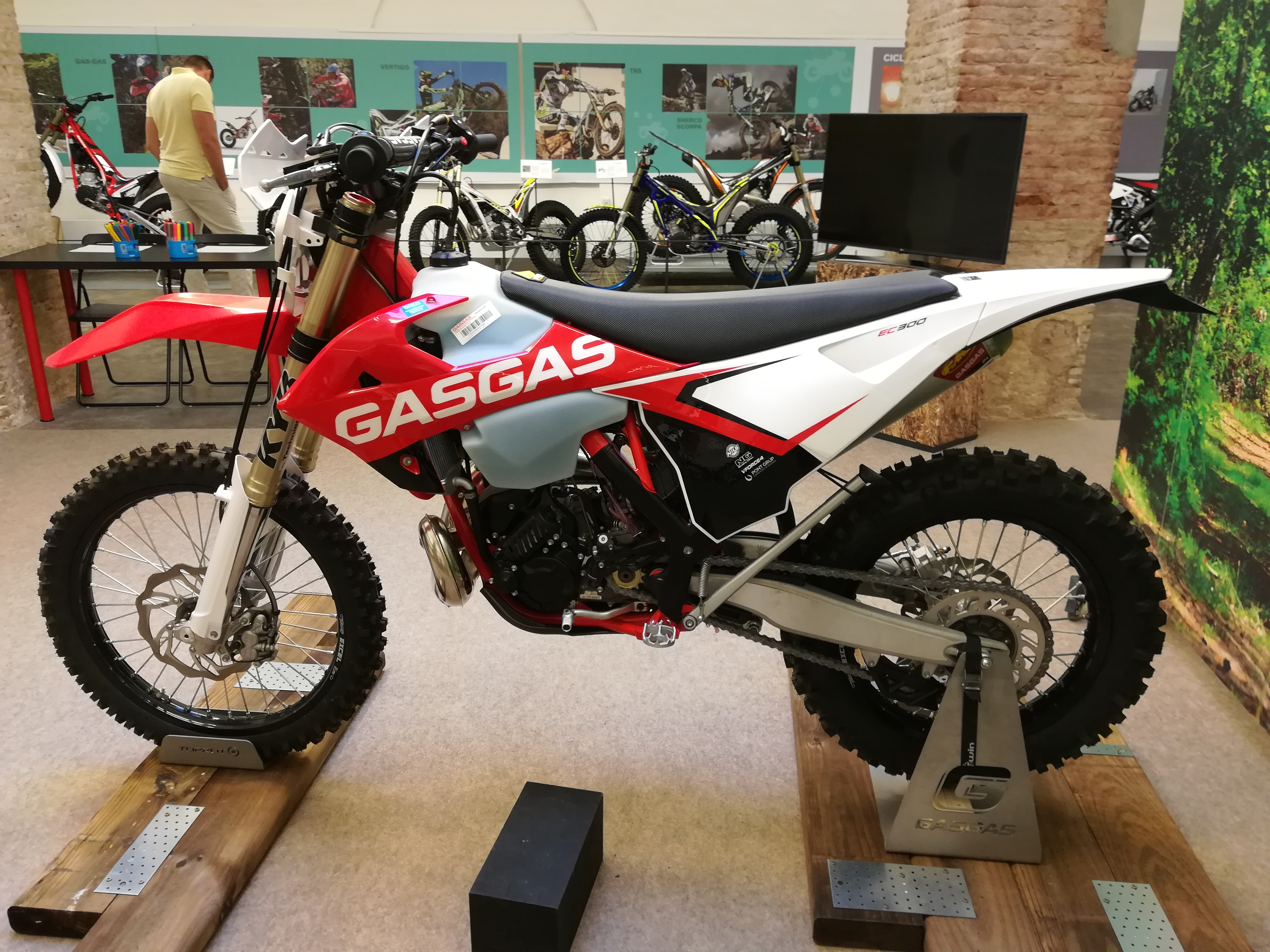
2017 GasGas EC 300

GasGas Motorcycles's enduro lineup includes models like the EC and EX series, which are built for long-distance off-road riding.

The FSE and FSR are the fuel injected, four-stroke enduro bikes similar in appearance to the EC models.

In 2007–2009, the company standardized the color red for all displacements and models. As of the 2010 model year, all standard EC models are black with red and white accents. The "Six Days" edition uses white plastics with red, yellow, and black accents. The "Racing" models are white with black and yellow accents.

=== Trials motorcycles ===
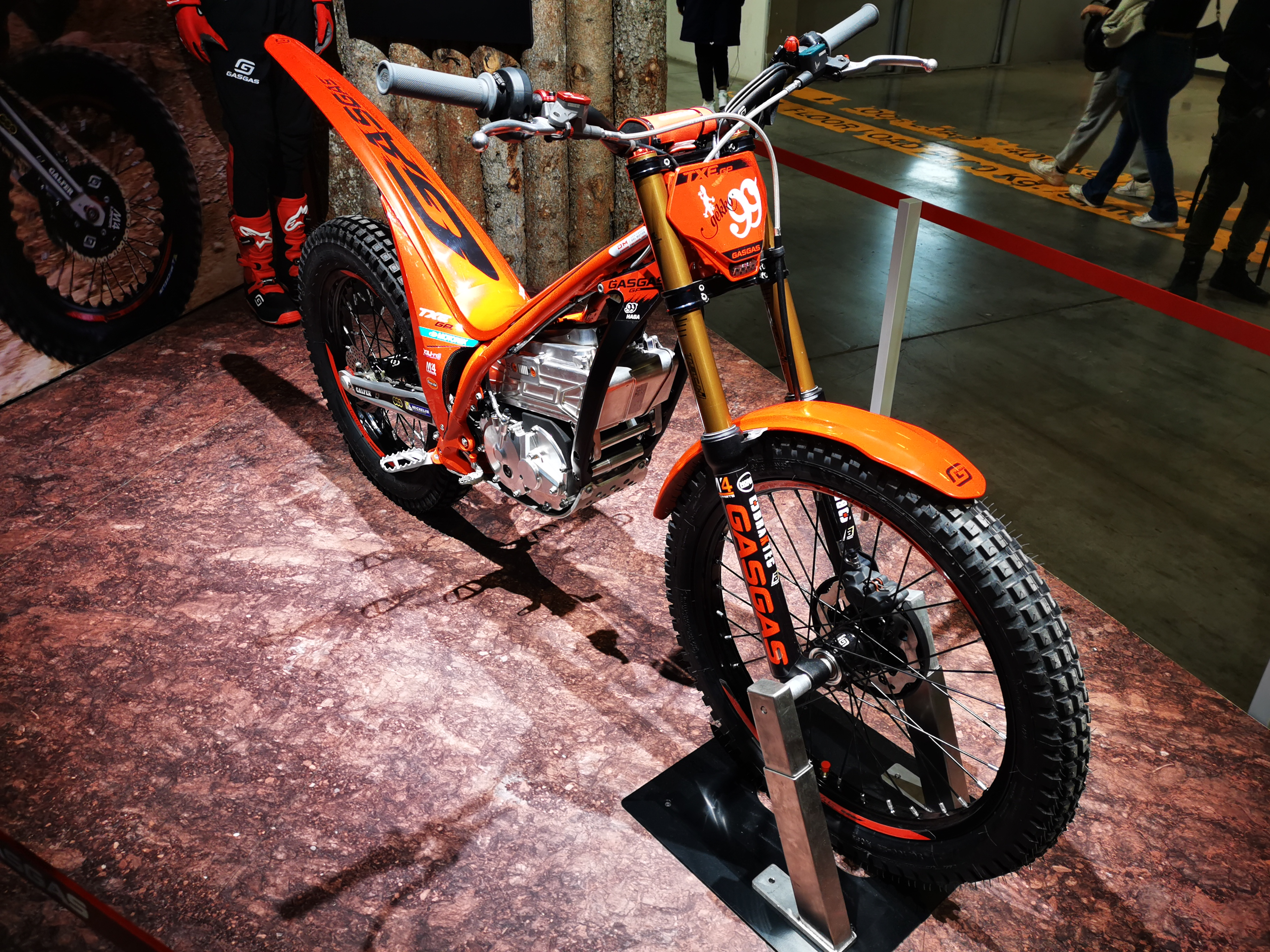
2024 Gas Gas TXT GP 250

GasGas is renowned for its trial bikes, which are designed for agility, and includes the TXT series.

=== Motocross motorcycles ===
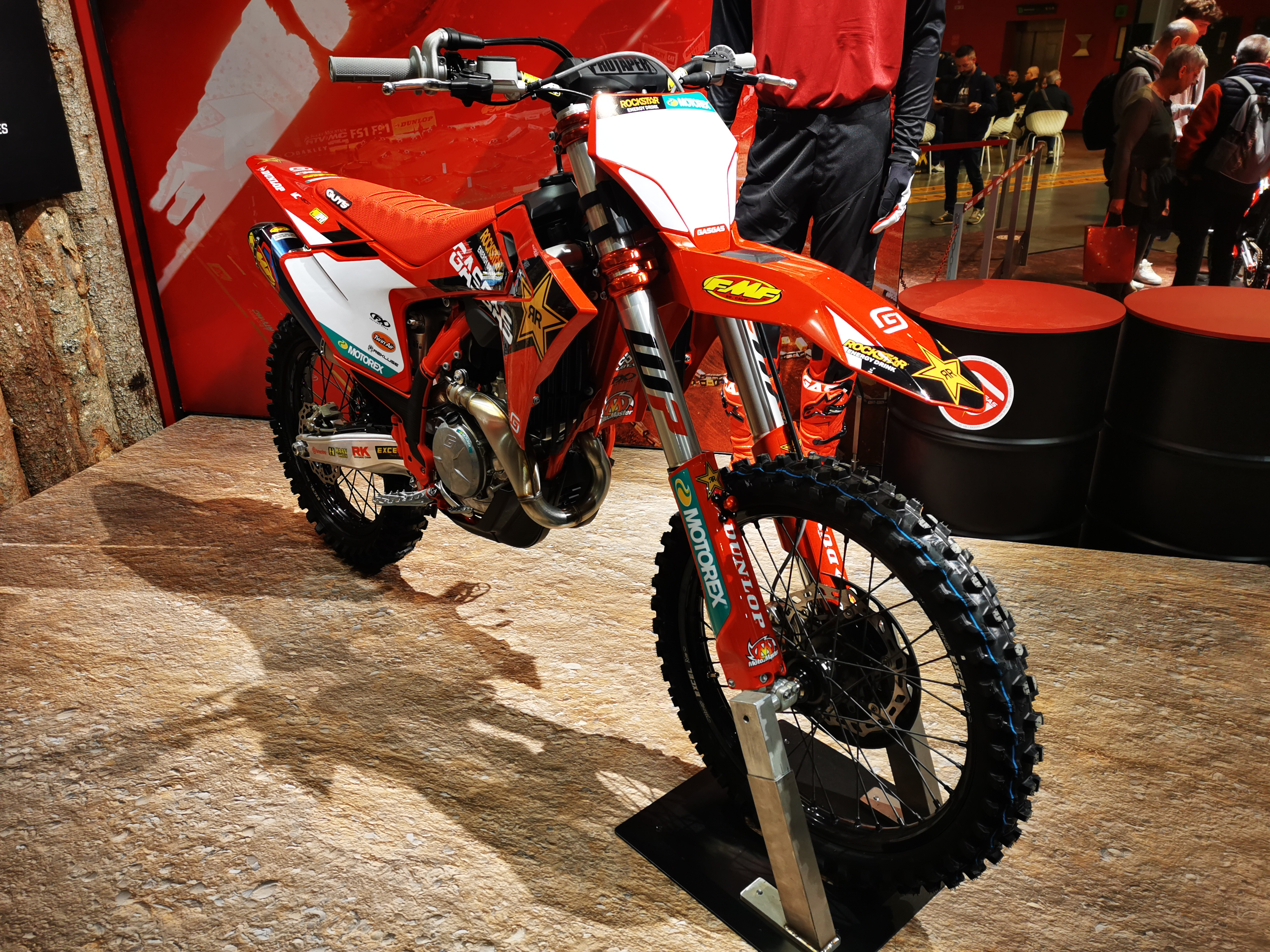
2024 Gas Gas MC 450F

The motocross range includes the MC series, designed for high-performance racing on motocross tracks.

=== Electric motorcycles ===
In recent years, GasGas has also ventured into electric motorcycles with models like the TXE. These bikes offer environmentally friendly alternatives while maintaining the high performance.

=== Quads motorcycles ===
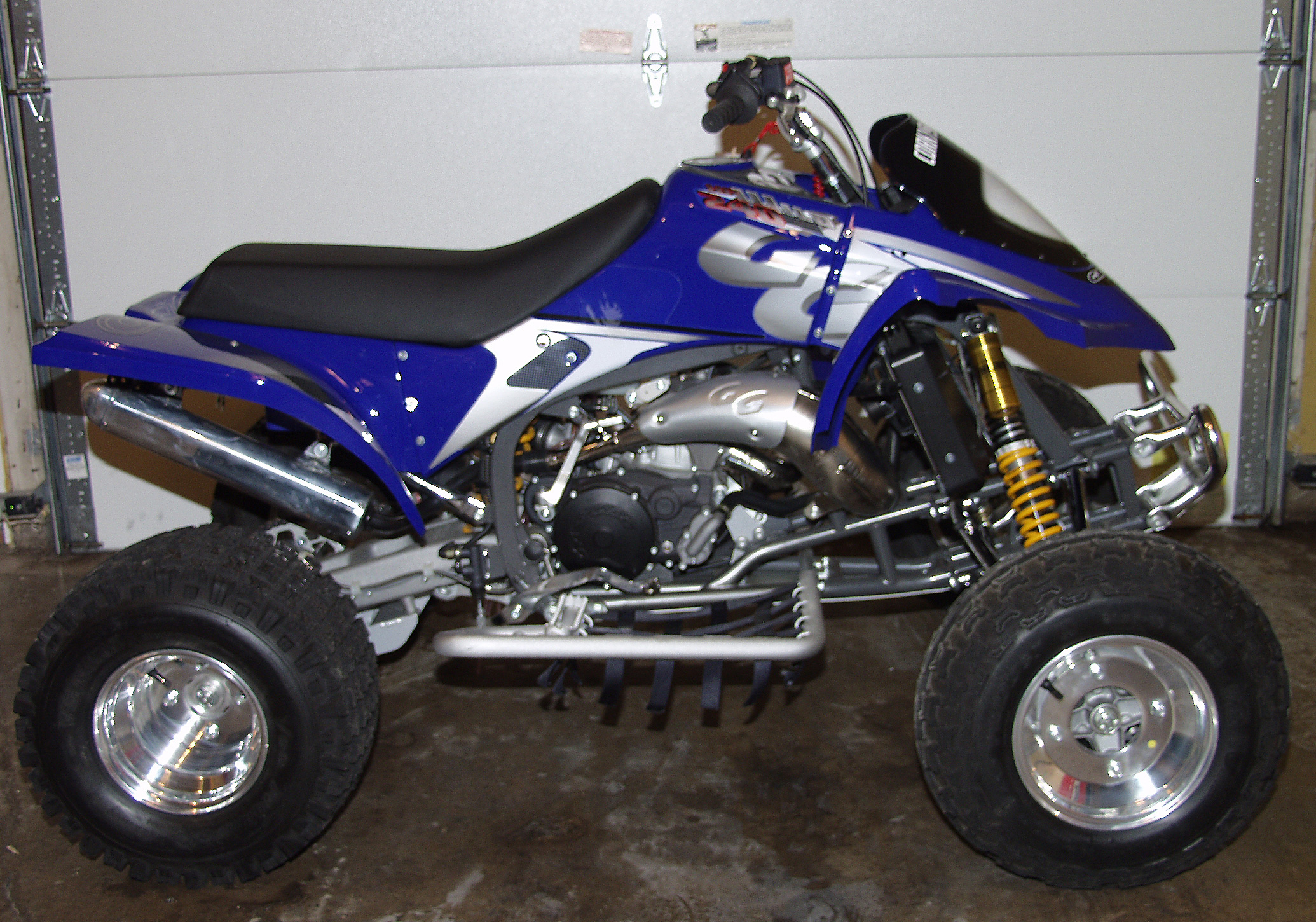
2005 Gas Gas Wild HP240 Quad

The GasGas sport quads are sold under the Wild HP brand and come in two-stroke and fuel-injected four-stroke models.

Before 2007, the Wild HP line of quads was available in a choice of blue or red regardless of displacement. Beginning in 2007, the Wild HP line standardized to black.

=== Enduro bicycles ===
The GasGas Enduro off-road bicycles feature three models, the ECC, ECA, and G Enduro.

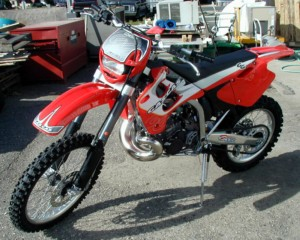
2001 GasGas XC 250 USA market only (XC produced from 1999 to 2002)

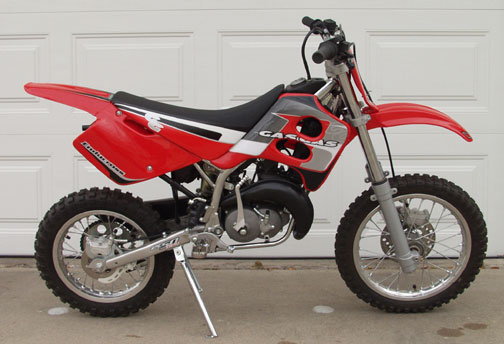
2003 GasGas MC50 mini bike

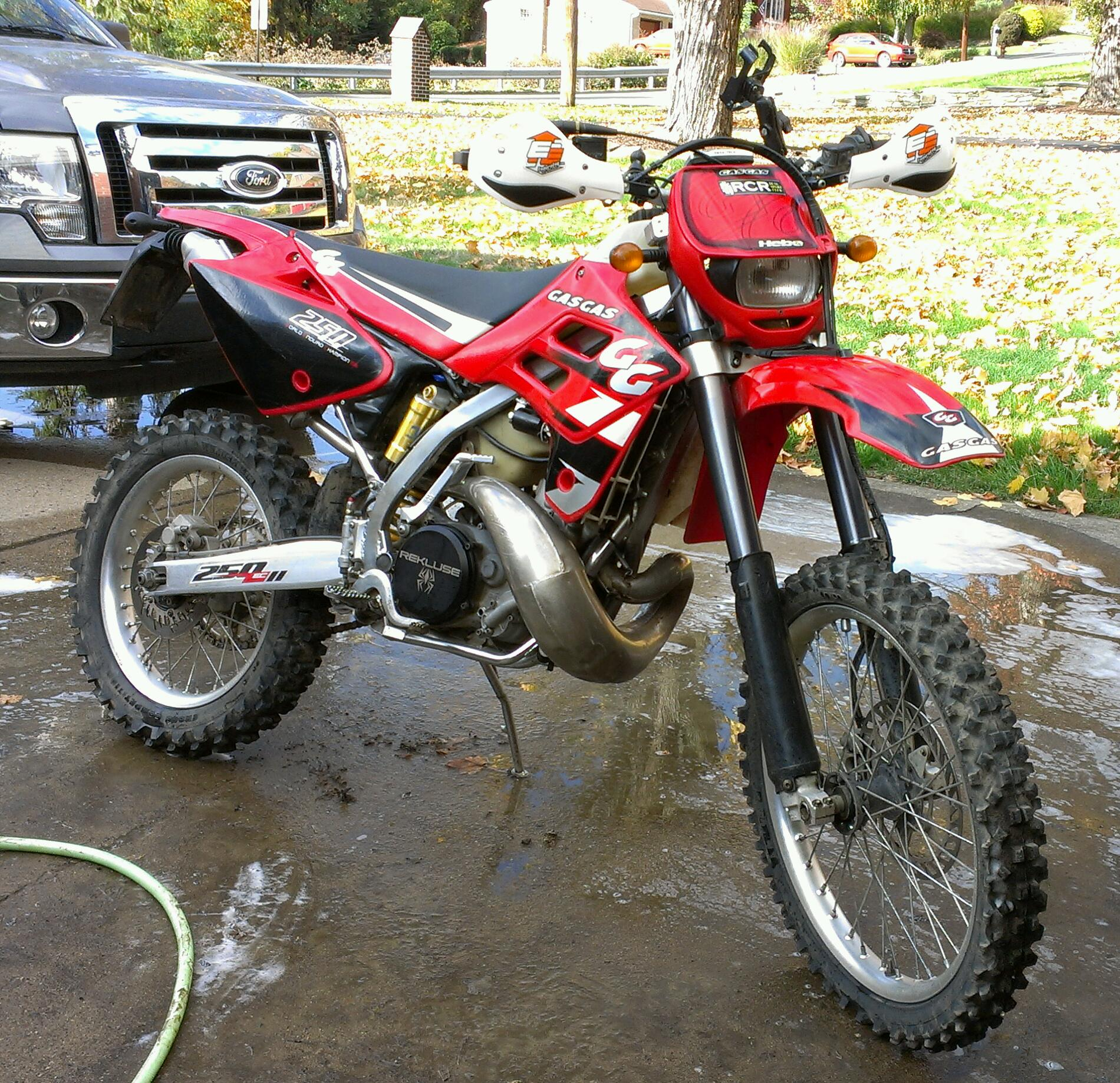
2003 GasGas EC 250

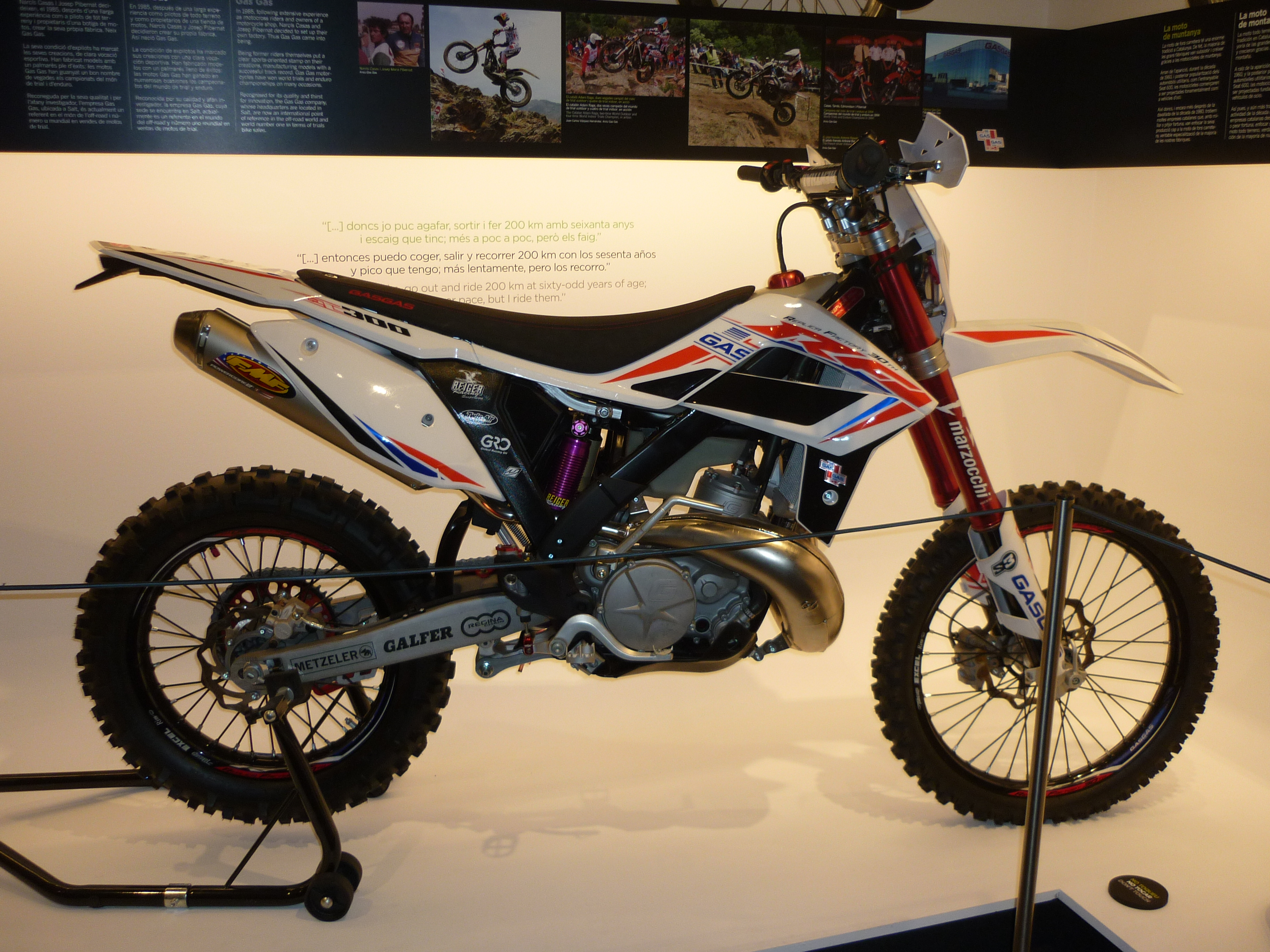
2015 GasGas EC 300 30th Anniversary edition

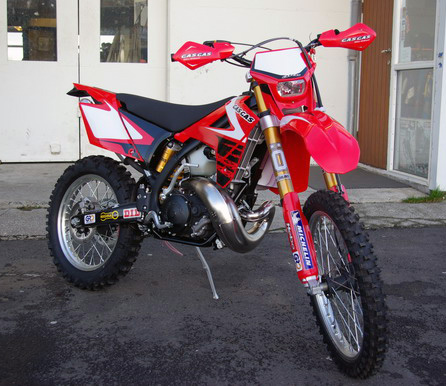
2009 GasGas EC 300

== Championships and riders ==
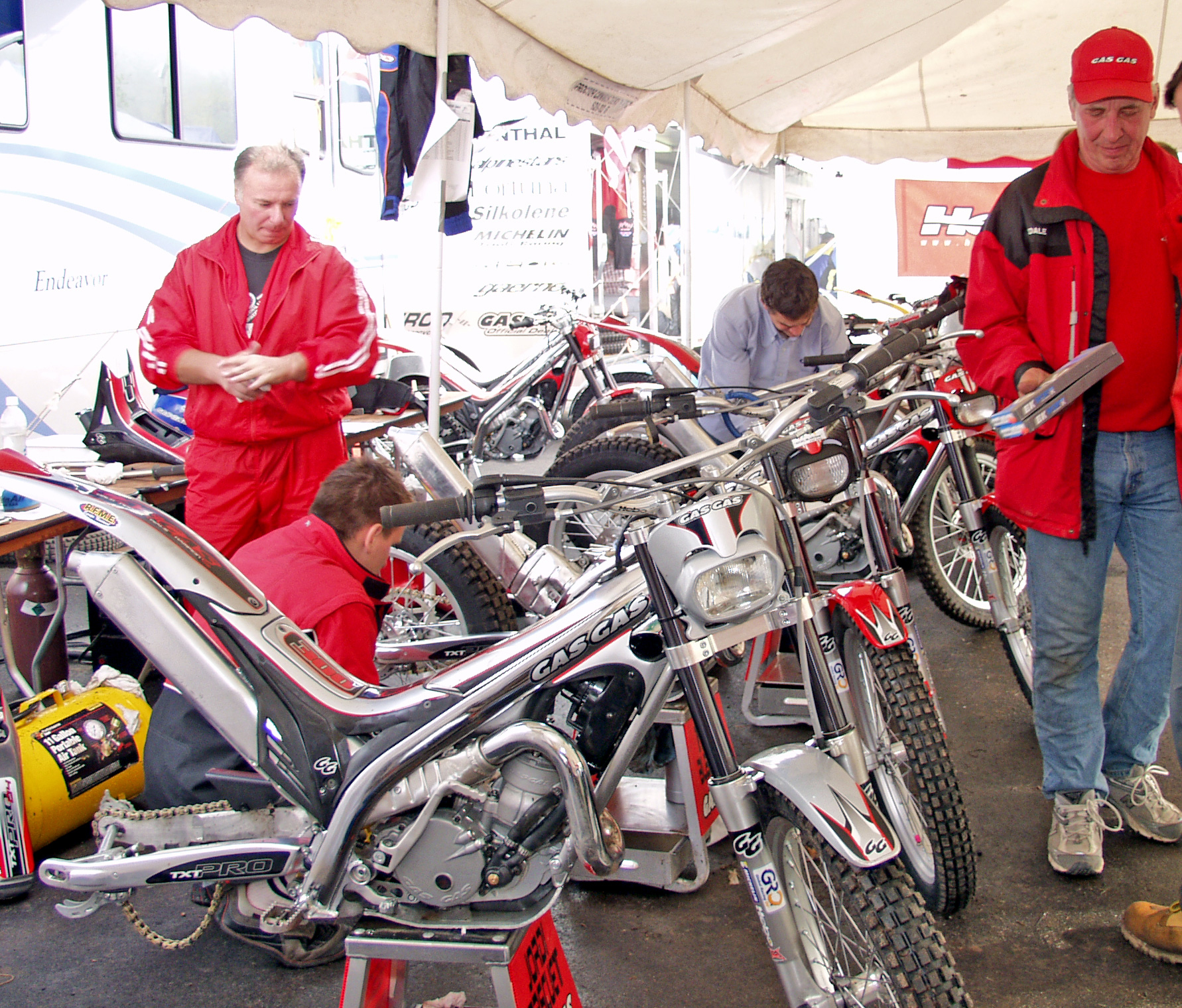
GasGas trials paddock, Duluth, Minnesota, 2004.

In 1993, GasGas succeeded in luring the multiple world trials champion Jordi Tarrés away from Beta and he promptly won three successive world trials championships (1993, 1994 and 1995) for GasGas.

More recently, GasGas won the Trial Outdoor World Championship twice (2005 and 2006) with Adam Raga. It has also won the Trial Indoor World Championship in 2003, 2004, 2005 and 2006 with Raga riding.

GasGas has also been successful in the World Enduro Championship. Paul Edmondson won the 125cc world championship in 1994 and the 250cc class in 1996, Petteri Silván the 250cc and the overall championship in 1999, and Petri Pohjamo the 125cc class in 2003.

In 2006, British Enduro Champion Wayne Braybrook, riding a GasGas, was one of only two riders to finish all 80 miles of the Red Bull Last Man Standing event. 126 other riders did not finish the race.

It was announced that GasGas would field a one rider team for the 2021 Monster Energy Supercross season. Justin Barcia rode the #51 Troy Lee Designs/Red Bull/GasGas Factory Racing team bike to a win in the season opener at Houston.

The brand has competed in the Dakar Rally with Laia Sanz (2012 and 2021), Daniel Sanders (since 2022) and Sam Sunderland (since 2022). Sunderland won the 2022 edition.

== Motorsport achievements ==
GasGas motorcycles have achieved significant success in various off-road competitions. The brand's trial and enduro bikes have won numerous world championships.

In both 2023 and 2024, Gas Gas won the premier class of the Motocross World Championship with Spanish rider Jorge Prado.

== Racing ==
=== Grand Prix ===
==== MotoGP ====
During the 2023 and 2024 season, GasGas sponsored the Tech3 racing team.

Year	Bike	Riders	Races	Wins	Podiums	Poles	F. laps	Points	Pos.
2023	RC16	(Spain) Augusto Fernández	20	0	0	0	0	71	17th
2023	RC16	(Spain) Pol Espargaró	12	0	0	0	0	15	23rd
2023	RC16	(Germany) Jonas Folger	6	0	0	0	0	9	25th
2024	RC16	(Spain) Pedro Acosta	20	0	5	1	2	215	6th
2024	RC16	(Spain) Augusto Fernández	20	0	0	0	0	27	20th

==== Moto2 ====
Starting from the 2022 season, GasGas is the sponsor working with the Aspar Team in the Moto2 world championship and uses the name GasGas Aspar Team. The partnership concluded at the end of 2023 season as Aspar will carry the branding of Pierer-owned CFMoto in 2024 season.

Year	Motorcycle	No.	Riders	Races	Wins	Podiums	Poles	F. laps	Points	Pos.
2022	Kalex Moto2	75	(Spain) Albert Arenas	20	0	0	0	0	90	12th
2022	Kalex Moto2	96	(United Kingdom) Jake Dixon	20	0	6	2	0	168.5	6th
2022	Kalex Moto2	11	(Italy) Mattia Pasini	2 (3)	0	0	0	0	1	33rd
2023	Kalex Moto2	28	(Spain) Izan Guevara	18	0	0	0	0	20	22nd
2023	Kalex Moto2	96	(United Kingdom) Jake Dixon	19	2	5	2	1	204	4th
2023	Kalex Moto2	81	(Spain) Jordi Torres	2	0	0	0	0	0	32nd

==== Moto3 ====
After being acquired by KTM, GasGas entered the Moto3 World Championship as a unique constructor using their KTM-based RC250GP.

Year	Motorcycle	No.	Riders	Races	Wins	Podiums	Poles	F. laps	Points	Pos.
2021	GasGas RC250GP	11	(Spain) Sergio García	16	3	6	1	1	188	3rd
2021	GasGas RC250GP	28	(Spain) Izan Guevara	18	1	1	0	4	125	8th
2021	GasGas RC250GP	80	(Colombia) David Alonso	1	0	0	0	0	0	38th
2022	GasGas RC250GP	11	(Spain) Sergio García	19	3	10	1	0	257	2nd
2022	GasGas RC250GP	28	(Spain) Izan Guevara	20	7	12	5	2	319	1st
2022	GasGas RC250GP	80	(Colombia) David Alonso	1	0	0	0	0	0	44th
2022	GasGas RC250GP	77	(Italy) Filippo Farioli	1	0	0	0	0	0	33rd
2023	GasGas RC250GP	6	(Japan) Ryusei Yamanaka	20	0	0	0	1	84	13th
2023	GasGas RC250GP	80	(Colombia) David Alonso	20	4	8	0	3	245	3rd
2024	GasGas RC250GP	96	(Spain) Daniel Holgado	20	1	8	1	3	256	2nd
2024	GasGas RC250GP	12	(Australia) Jacob Roulstone	20	0	0	0	0	66	15th
