= Volker =

Volker may refer to:

- Volker (name), including a list of people with the given name or surname
- Volker, Kansas City, a historic neighborhood in Kansas City
- Volker Boulevard, Kansas City
- Alien Nations (German: Die Völker), a real-time strategy video game released in 1999

== See also ==
- VolkerWessels, a Dutch construction company
  - VolkerRail, a railway infrastructure services company based in Doncaster, England, owned by VolkerWessels
- Voelcker (disambiguation)
- Voelker (disambiguation)
