= Duisburg II =

Federal electoral district of Germany

115 Duisburg II
- Electoral district for the Bundestag
- Duisburg II in 2025
- State: North Rhine-Westphalia
- Population: 253,100 (2019)
- Electorate: 155,265 (2021)
- Major settlements: Duisburg (partial)
- Area: 113.7 km^{2}

Current electoral district
- Created: 1949
- Party: SPD
- Member: Mahmut Özdemir
- Elected: 2013, 2017, 2021, 2025

Duisburg II is an electoral constituency (German: Wahlkreis) represented in the Bundestag. It elects one member via first-past-the-post voting. Under the current constituency numbering system, it is designated as constituency 115. It is located in the Ruhr region of North Rhine-Westphalia, comprising the northern part of the city of Duisburg.

Duisburg II was created for the inaugural 1949 federal election. Since 2013, it has been represented by Mahmut Özdemir of the Social Democratic Party (SPD).

== Geography ==
Duisburg II is located in the Ruhr region of North Rhine-Westphalia. As of the 2021 federal election, it comprises the northern part of the independent city of Duisburg, specifically the Stadtbezirke of Walsum, Hamborn, Meiderich/Beeck, and Homberg/Ruhrort/Baerl, as well as the Stadtteil of Duissern from Mitte.

== History ==
Duisburg II was created in 1949. In the 1949 election, it was North Rhine-Westphalia constituency 34 in the numbering system. From 1953 through 1961, it was number 93. From 1965 through 1976, it was number 91. From 1980 through 1998, it was number 85. From 2002 through 2009, it was number 117. In the 2013 through 2021 elections, it was number 116. From the 2025 election, it has been number 115.

Originally, the constituency comprised the area of Duisburg south of the Ruhr except for the Stadtteile of Laar and Ruhrort. From 1965 through 1976, it comprised the area of Duisburg south of the Ruhr. From 1980 through 2009, it comprised the Stadtbezirke of Walsum, Hamborn, Meiderich/Beeck, and Homberg/Ruhrort/Baerl. In the 2013 election, it acquired the Stadtteil of Duissern.

Election	No.	Name	Borders
1949	34	Duisburg II	Duisburg city (only the area south of the Ruhr except for the Stadtteile of Laar and Ruhrort)
1953	93	Duisburg II	Duisburg city (only the area south of the Ruhr except for the Stadtteile of Laar and Ruhrort)
1957	93	Duisburg II	Duisburg city (only the area south of the Ruhr except for the Stadtteile of Laar and Ruhrort)
1961	93	Duisburg II	Duisburg city (only the area south of the Ruhr except for the Stadtteile of Laar and Ruhrort)
1965	91	Duisburg II	Duisburg city (only the area south of the Ruhr)
1969	91	Duisburg II	Duisburg city (only the area south of the Ruhr)
1972	91	Duisburg II	Duisburg city (only the area south of the Ruhr)
1976	91	Duisburg II	Duisburg city (only the area south of the Ruhr)
1980	85	Duisburg II	Duisburg city (only Walsum, Hamborn, Meiderich/Beeck, and Homberg/Ruhrort/Baerl Stadtbezirke)
1983	85	Duisburg II	Duisburg city (only Walsum, Hamborn, Meiderich/Beeck, and Homberg/Ruhrort/Baerl Stadtbezirke)
1987	85	Duisburg II	Duisburg city (only Walsum, Hamborn, Meiderich/Beeck, and Homberg/Ruhrort/Baerl Stadtbezirke)
1990	85	Duisburg II	Duisburg city (only Walsum, Hamborn, Meiderich/Beeck, and Homberg/Ruhrort/Baerl Stadtbezirke)
1994	85	Duisburg II	Duisburg city (only Walsum, Hamborn, Meiderich/Beeck, and Homberg/Ruhrort/Baerl Stadtbezirke)
1998	85	Duisburg II	Duisburg city (only Walsum, Hamborn, Meiderich/Beeck, and Homberg/Ruhrort/Baerl Stadtbezirke)
2002	117	Duisburg II	Duisburg city (only Walsum, Hamborn, Meiderich/Beeck, and Homberg/Ruhrort/Baerl Stadtbezirke)
2005	117	Duisburg II	Duisburg city (only Walsum, Hamborn, Meiderich/Beeck, and Homberg/Ruhrort/Baerl Stadtbezirke)
2009	117	Duisburg II	Duisburg city (only Walsum, Hamborn, Meiderich/Beeck, and Homberg/Ruhrort/Baerl Stadtbezirke)
2013	116	Duisburg II	Duisburg city (only Mitte (only Duissern Stadtteil), Walsum, Hamborn, Meiderich/Beeck, and Homberg/Ruhrort/Baerl Stadtbezirke)
2017	116	Duisburg II	Duisburg city (only Mitte (only Duissern Stadtteil), Walsum, Hamborn, Meiderich/Beeck, and Homberg/Ruhrort/Baerl Stadtbezirke)
2021	116	Duisburg II	Duisburg city (only Mitte (only Duissern Stadtteil), Walsum, Hamborn, Meiderich/Beeck, and Homberg/Ruhrort/Baerl Stadtbezirke)
2025	115	Duisburg II	Duisburg city (only Mitte (only Duissern Stadtteil), Walsum, Hamborn, Meiderich/Beeck, and Homberg/Ruhrort/Baerl Stadtbezirke)

== Members ==
The constituency has been held by the Social Democratic Party (SPD) during all but two Bundestag terms since 1949. It was first represented by Gustav Sander of the SPD for a single term from 1949, before Fritz Berendsen of the Christian Democratic Union (CDU) won it in 1953. He was re-elected in 1957. Hanns Theis regained it for the SPD in 1961, and was succeeded by Hermann Spillecke in 1965. He served until 1980, followed by Günter Schluckebier, who was representative until 1998. Johannes Pflug held the seat from 1998 to 2013. Mahmut Özdemir was elected in 2013, and re-elected in 2017, 2021, and 2025.

Election	Member	Party	%
1949	Gustav Sander	SPD	36.6
1953	Fritz Berendsen	CDU	50.1
1957	Fritz Berendsen	CDU	52.8
1961	Hanns Theis	SPD	45.1
1965	Hermann Spillecke	SPD	51.4
1969	Hermann Spillecke	SPD	56.0
1972	Hermann Spillecke	SPD	62.6
1976	Hermann Spillecke	SPD	57.5
1980	Günter Schluckebier	SPD	65.3
1983	Günter Schluckebier	SPD	62.7
1987	Günter Schluckebier	SPD	63.6
1990	Günter Schluckebier	SPD	60.0
1994	Günter Schluckebier	SPD	62.6
1998	Johannes Pflug	SPD	66.4
2002	Johannes Pflug	SPD	63.1
2005	Johannes Pflug	SPD	61.6
2009	Johannes Pflug	SPD	47.4
2013	Mahmut Özdemir	SPD	43.2
2017	Mahmut Özdemir	SPD	34.8
2021	Mahmut Özdemir	SPD	39.4
2025	Mahmut Özdemir	SPD	33.3

== Election results ==
=== 2025 election ===
Federal election (2025): Duisburg II
Notes:	Blue background denotes the winner of the electorate vote. Pink background denotes a candidate elected from their party list. Yellow background denotes an electorate win by a list member, or other incumbent. A ✓ or ✗ denotes status of any incumbent, win or lose respectively.						
Party	Candidate	Votes	%	±%	Party votes	%	±%
SPD	✓ Mahmut Özdemir	36,731	33.3	▼6.2	28,032	25.3	▼11.6
AfD	Sascha Lensing	29,445	26.7	▲12.9	27,428	24.8	▲12.6
CDU	Björn Polymer	21,791	19.7	▼0.3	21,520	19.4	▲0.7
Greens	Felix Banaszak	7,599	6.9	▼4.0	7,268	6.6	▼4.0
BSW					6,472	5.8	
Left	Hüseyin Aydin	9,976	9.0	▲4.0	12,272	11.1	▲6.4
FDP	Markus Giesler	2,394	2.2	▼5.0	2,948	2.7	▼5.5
Tierschutzpartei					1,920	1.7	▼0.3
FW	Stefanie Kreitz	1,575	1.4	▲0.1	539	0.5	▼0.2
PARTEI					650	0.6	▼0.7
Independent	Hans Gaisenkersting	560	0.5				
Team Todenhöfer					504	0.5	▼1.6
Volt					396	0.4	▲0.2
MLPD	Peter Römmele	359	0.3	0.0	122	0.1	▼0.1
dieBasis				▼1.0	201	0.2	▼0.6
PdF					166	0.1	▲0.1
BD					155	0.1	
MERA25					98	0.1	
Values					61	0.1	
Pirates							▼0.4
Gesundheitsforschung							▼0.2
Humanists							▼0.1
Bündnis C							▼0.1
ÖDP							▼0.1
SGP						0.0	0.0
Informal votes		1,417			1,095		
Total valid votes		110,430			110,752		
Turnout		111,847	73.4	▲10.1			
SPD hold	Majority	7,286	6.6				

=== 2021 election ===
Federal election (2021): Duisburg II
Notes:	Blue background denotes the winner of the electorate vote. Pink background denotes a candidate elected from their party list. Yellow background denotes an electorate win by a list member, or other incumbent. A ✓ or ✗ denotes status of any incumbent, win or lose respectively.						
Party	Candidate	Votes	%	±%	Party votes	%	±%
SPD	✓ Mahmut Özdemir	38,162	39.4	▲4.7	35,842	36.9	▲2.8
CDU	Volker Mosblech	19,404	20.0	▼6.4	18,168	18.7	▼3.7
AfD	Rainer Holfeld	13,361	13.8	▼2.8	11,834	12.2	▼3.3
Greens	Felix Banaszak	10,518	10.9	▲6.3	10,287	10.6	▲6.2
FDP	Markus Giesler	6,901	7.1	▲0.1	7,913	8.1	▼0.1
Left	Christian Leye	4,889	5.1	▼3.8	4,508	4.6	▼3.8
Tierschutzpartei					2,021	2.1	▲1.0
Team Todenhöfer					1,980	2.0	
PARTEI					1,235	1.3	▲0.3
FW	Mark Altenschmidt	1,263	1.3		674	0.7	▲0.4
dieBasis	Beate Buchra	1,007	1.0		755	0.8	
Unabhängige	Roland Helmer	547	0.6				
Pirates					379	0.4	▼0.3
Independent	Ayfer Saygili	314	0.3				
NPD					236	0.2	▼0.3
Volt					200	0.2	
LIEBE					186	0.2	
MLPD	Peter Römmele	313	0.3	0.0	172	0.2	0.0
Gesundheitsforschung					164	0.2	▲0.1
Independent	Marliese Lens	130	0.1				
LfK					128	0.1	
V-Partei3					90	0.1	0.0
Humanists					81	0.1	0.0
Bündnis C					73	0.1	
du.					63	0.1	
ÖDP					56	0.1	0.0
DKP					41	0.0	0.0
PdF					38	0.0	
LKR					26	0.0	
SGP					15	0.0	0.0
Informal votes		1,530			1,173		
Total valid votes		96,809			97,166		
Turnout		98,339	63.3	▼1.4			
SPD hold	Majority	18,758	19.4	▲11.1			

=== 2017 election ===
Federal election (2017): Duisburg II
Notes:	Blue background denotes the winner of the electorate vote. Pink background denotes a candidate elected from their party list. Yellow background denotes an electorate win by a list member, or other incumbent. A ✓ or ✗ denotes status of any incumbent, win or lose respectively.						
Party	Candidate	Votes	%	±%	Party votes	%	±%
SPD	✓ Mahmut Özdemir	34,799	34.7	▼8.5	34,695	34.1	▼8.9
CDU	Volker Mosblech	26,522	26.4	▼3.1	22,830	22.4	▼4.1
AfD	Karl Michael Solms	16,643	16.6	▲12.4	15,794	15.5	▲10.4
Left	Martin Kretschmer	8,885	8.9	▲0.2	8,546	8.4	▼0.4
FDP	Frank Albrecht	7,054	7.0	▲5.4	8,369	8.2	▲5.4
Greens	Felix Banaszak	4,622	4.6	▼0.6	4,493	4.4	▼0.7
AD-DEMOKRATEN					2,483	2.4	
Independent	Burhanettin Datli	1,415	1.4				
Tierschutzpartei					1,068	1.0	
PARTEI					938	0.9	▲0.6
Pirates					688	0.7	▼1.7
NPD					594	0.6	▼2.8
FW					262	0.3	▲0.1
MLPD	Peter Römmele	368	0.4	0.0	213	0.2	0.0
DM					116	0.1	
Gesundheitsforschung					116	0.1	
BGE					108	0.1	
DiB					104	0.1	
Volksabstimmung					102	0.1	▼0.1
V-Partei³					99	0.1	
ÖDP					61	0.1	0.0
Die Humanisten					52	0.1	
DKP					41	0.0	
SGP					20	0.0	0.0
Informal votes		3,396			1,912		
Total valid votes		100,308			101,792		
Turnout		103,704	64.7	▲1.1			
SPD hold	Majority	8,277	8.3	▼5.3			

=== 2013 election ===
Federal election (2013): Duisburg II
Notes:	Blue background denotes the winner of the electorate vote. Pink background denotes a candidate elected from their party list. Yellow background denotes an electorate win by a list member, or other incumbent. A ✓ or ✗ denotes status of any incumbent, win or lose respectively.						
Party	Candidate	Votes	%	±%	Party votes	%	±%
SPD	Mahmut Özdemir	44,759	43.2	▼3.4	44,727	43.0	▲3.0
CDU	Volker Mosblech (Note: Mosblech entered the Bundestag on the CDU list after the resignation of Philipp Mißfelder in July 2015.)	30,654	29.6	▲2.5	27,665	26.6	▲2.9
Left	Lukas Maximilian Hirtz	8,920	8.6	▼2.4	9,160	8.8	▼4.8
Greens	Matthias Schneider	5,371	5.2	▼1.0	5,376	5.2	▼2.2
NPD	Sven Peter Stölting	4,676	4.5	▲1.5	3,507	3.4	▲1.4
AfD	Alan Daniel Imamura	4,299	4.1		5,349	5.1	
Pirates	Kurt Alexander Klein	2,909	2.8		2,449	2.4	▲0.7
FDP	Frank Albrecht	1,680	1.6	▼4.0	2,891	2.8	▼5.8
PRO					845	0.8	
PARTEI					365	0.4	
BIG					335	0.3	
REP					299	0.3	▼0.2
Volksabstimmung					248	0.2	▲0.2
MLPD	Jürgen Blumer	351	0.3	▲0.1	228	0.2	0.0
FW					143	0.1	
Nichtwahler					122	0.1	
RRP					115	0.1	▼0.1
Die Rechte					77	0.1	
ÖDP					75	0.1	0.0
Party of Reason					72	0.1	
PSG					52	0.0	0.0
BüSo					32	0.0	0.0
Informal votes		2,063			1,550		
Total valid votes		103,619			104,132		
Turnout		105,682	63.6	▲2.9			
SPD hold	Majority	14,105	13.6	▼7.4			

=== 2009 election ===
Federal election (2009): Duisburg II
Notes:	Blue background denotes the winner of the electorate vote. Pink background denotes a candidate elected from their party list. Yellow background denotes an electorate win by a list member, or other incumbent. A ✓ or ✗ denotes status of any incumbent, win or lose respectively.						
Party	Candidate	Votes	%	±%	Party votes	%	±%
SPD	✓ Johannes Pflug	44,436	47.4	▼14.2	38,305	40.7	▼14.6
CDU	Volker Mosblech	24,779	26.4	▲1.8	21,808	23.2	▲2.0
Left	Hüseyin Aydin	10,519	11.2	▲4.5	12,940	13.8	▲5.9
Greens	Matthias Schneider	5,430	5.8	▲3.2	6,582	7.0	▲1.0
FDP	Thomas Wolter	5,189	5.5	▲3.2	7,872	8.4	▲2.9
NPD	Rudi Theißen	2,953	3.1	▲1.2	1,960	2.1	▲0.5
Pirates					1,503	1.6	
Tierschutzpartei					818	0.9	▲0.2
REP					519	0.6	0.0
FAMILIE					502	0.5	▼0.1
RENTNER					453	0.5	
Independent	Andreas Schneider	264	0.3				
Centre					177	0.2	▲0.2
RRP					175	0.2	
MLPD	Jürgen Blumer	275	0.3	0.0	168	0.2	0.0
DVU					114	0.1	
Volksabstimmung					80	0.1	0.0
ÖDP					51	0.1	
BüSo					32	0.0	0.0
PSG					28	0.0	0.0
Informal votes		1,709			1,467		
Total valid votes		93,845			94,087		
Turnout		95,554	59.9	▼11.2			
SPD hold	Majority	19,657	21.0	▼16.0			

=== 2005 election ===
Federal election (2005): Duisburg II
Notes:	Blue background denotes the winner of the electorate vote. Pink background denotes a candidate elected from their party list. Yellow background denotes an electorate win by a list member, or other incumbent. A ✓ or ✗ denotes status of any incumbent, win or lose respectively.						
Party	Candidate	Votes	%	±%	Party votes	%	±%
SPD	✓ Johannes Pflug	70,299	61.6	▼1.5	62,995	55.3	▼3.7
CDU	Volker Mosblech	28,066	24.6	▲0.1	24,076	21.1	▼1.7
Left	Brigitte Diesterhöft	7,621	6.7	▲4.6	8,980	7.9	▲6.1
Greens	Susann Ulbricht	2,942	2.6	▼1.5	6,873	6.0	▼0.4
FDP	Thomas Wolters	2,625	2.3	▼2.5	6,219	5.5	▼0.7
NPD	Frank Theißen	2,246	2.0		1,798	1.6	▲1.1
Tierschutzpartei					745	0.7	▲0.2
REP					650	0.6	▼0.2
Familie					524	0.5	▲0.2
GRAUEN					519	0.5	▲0.2
MLPD	Nina Brandt	371	0.3		242	0.2	
From Now on... Democracy Through Referendum					121	0.1	
PBC					66	0.1	
Socialist Equality Party					47	0.0	
Centre					41	0.0	
BüSo					38	0.0	0.0
Informal votes		2,088			2,324		
Total valid votes		114,170			113,934		
Turnout		116,258	71.1	▼1.8			
SPD hold	Majority	42,233	37				
