= Volker (name) =

Volker is an old German name, derived from folk, folc (people, tribe), and heri (army, warrior). Which means people’s defender.

Notable people with the name include:

== Given name ==
- Volker Beck (politician) (born 1960), German politician (Greens)
- Volker Beck (athlete) (born 1956), East German athlete
- Volker Bertelmann (born 1966), German composer and pianist
- Volker Bouffier (born 1951), German politician (CDU)
- Volker Braun (born 1939), German author
- Volker Bromm, American astronomer
- Volker Bruch (born 1980), German actor
- Volker Dringenberg (born 1972), German politician
- Volker Eckert (1959-2007), German serial killer
- Volker Engel (born 1965), German-born visual effects artist with Hollywood credits
- Volker Finke (born 1948), German football manager and former player
- Volker Grassmuck (born 1961), German sociologist and media researcher
- Volker Hage (1949–2026), German journalist, author and literary critic
- Volker Haucke (born 1968), German biochemist and cell biologist
- Volker Herold (born 1959), German actor and director
- Volker Kriegel (1943–2003), German jazz guitarist and composer
- Volker Kutscher (born 1962), German writer
- Volker Lechtenbrink (1944–2021), German television actor and singer
- Volker Mosblech (1955–2024), German politician (CDU)
- Volker Pispers (born 1958), German political comedian
- Volker Presser (born 1982), German materials scientist
- Volker Rühe, (born 1942), German politician and former Defence Minister (CDU)
- Volker Scheurell (born 1967), German politician
- Volker Schlöndorff (born 1939), German filmmaker
- Volker Schmidt (born 1978), German footballer
- Volker Schnurrbusch (born 1958), German politician
- Volker Strassen (born 1936), German mathematician
- Volker Türk (born 1965), Austrian lawyer and United Nations official
- Volker Wangenheim (1928–2014), German conductor, composer and academic teacher
- Volker Weidler (born 1962), German (former) racing driver
- Volker Wissing (born 1970), German politician (FDP)
- Volker Zerbe (born 1968), German team handball (former) player, later club manager
- Volker Zotz (born 1956), Austrian philosopher and author

== Surname ==
- Alexandra Völker (born 1989), Swedish politician
- Floyd Volker (1921–1995), American basketball player
- Franz Völker (1899–1965), German opera singer
- Gerd Völker (1942–2025), German diver
- Karl Völker (1889–1962), German architect and painter
- Kurt Volker (born 1964), American diplomat
- Sabine Völker (born 1973), German speed skater
- Sandra Völker (born 1974), German swimmer
- William Volker (1859–1947), German-born American entrepreneur

== See also ==
- Voelcker, a surname
- Volkers, a surname
- Voelker, a surname
