= Winifred Hutchinson =

English classicist (1868 – 1937)

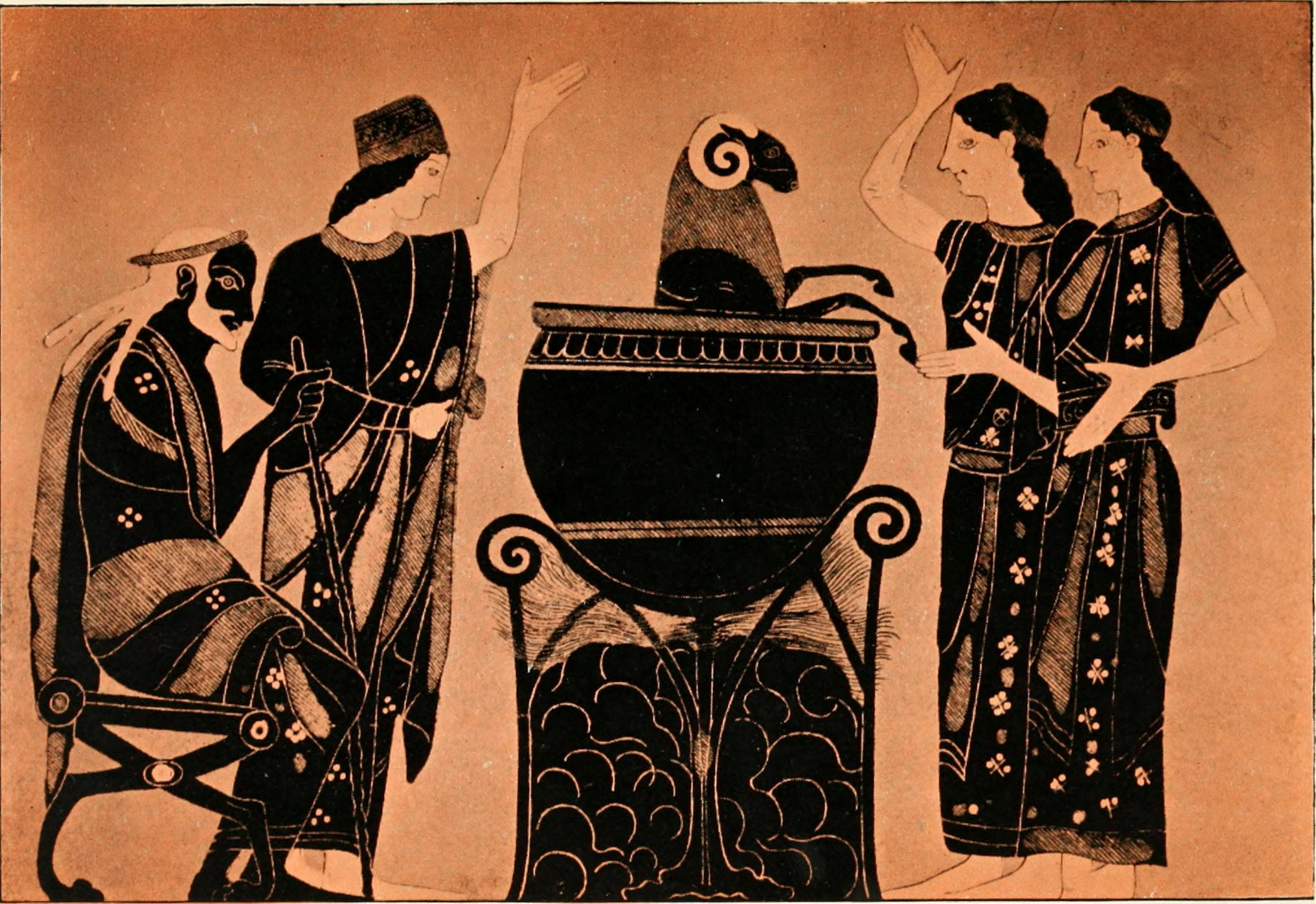
Illustration from Hutchinson's Golden Porch: a Book of Greek Fairy Tales.

Winifred Margaret Lambart Hutchinson (1868 – 1937) was an English classicist. As well as producing editions and translations of classical texts, she wrote popular retellings of Greek legends which were welcomed at a time when classics as a subject was disappearing from school curricula. In particular, her three-volume The Muses’ Pageant: Myths & Legends of Ancient Greece (1912–4) was one of the twentieth century’s most widely read works on classical mythology.

== Early life and family ==
She was born in London in 1868 to solicitor Edward Hutchinson and his wife Margaret, née Leeman. She had a younger brother, bacteriologist Claud Mackenzie Hutchinson. Margaret’s obituary indicates that their household was a lively one: Margaret 'took a high place in the religious and literary circles of London' and Edward was lay secretary of the Church Missionary Society’s work in West Africa, meaning that 'his home was always full of black celebrities.' The family moved to Montrose, Angus around 1887, when Margaret died.

== Classicist ==
In 1891–2 Winifred took the Cambridge Local Examinations, passing German in Class I. She studied moral sciences and classics at Newnham College, Cambridge, in 1894–5.

After a short period teaching at the Graham Street High School, she returned to Newnham as a Fellow, where she studied the history of Aegina and published her essay 'Aeacus: A Judge of the Underworld' in 1901.

In Cambridge she took on pupils in Greek and wrote several well-received books intending to introduce children and young people to Greek mythology, as well as continuing her scholarly work. She revised William Melmoth’s eighteenth-century translation of the Letters of Pliny (1921–1927) and edited five books of Cicero’s On the Ends of Good and Evil (1909).

== WWI ==
Hutchinson and her housemate, book-binder Rosamond Philpott, were involved with war relief work in World War I, collecting clothes and equipment to send to Cambridge regiments with the Ladies' Recruiting Committee.

Towards the end of the war, Hutchinson was joint secretary of the Cambridge branch of the short-lived National Party.

== Later life ==
In 1917, she began working as secretary to writer Arthur Quiller-Couch, and helped with the preparation of his Oxford Book of English Prose.

In the late 1920s Hutchinson began struggling with blindness. She moved to Wells, Somerset, with Philpott, where she died in 1937.

== Select works ==
- Orpheus with his Lute: Stories of the World's Springtime (1909)
- The Sunset of the Heroes: Last Adventures of the Takers of Troy (1911)
- The Muses' Pageant (3 vols., 1912–1914)
- Golden Porch: a Book of Greek Fairy Tales (1914)
- Evergreen Stories, Retold from Classical Sources (1920–1933)
