= Volders (surname) =

Volders is a surname. Notable people with the surname include:

- Lancelot Volders (1636–1723), Flemish painter
- Mark Volders (born 1977), Belgian footballer

== See also ==
- Volkers
