= Frances Heywood =

British metallurgist and engineer

- Born: 14 April 1902; Brentford, England
- Died: 18 September 1994 (aged 92)
- Education: PhD
- Occupation: Engineer

Frances Heywood (14 April 1902 – 18 September 1994) was a British metallurgist and engineer.

== Early life and education ==
Heywood was born Frances Dora Weaver in Brentford, North east London, to an itinerant Methodist preacher. Her family followed her father so she attended Bradford Girls' Grammar School and Sheffield High School in Yorkshire. Heywood won the Arnott Scholarship which allowed her to get a degree in chemistry from Bedford College, University of London in 1924.

== Career ==
After college she got a position as Assistant Metallurgist in Harley, Surrey for the Lanston Monotype Company Ltd. While she was there, the mechanical team assisted her to keep her motorbike maintained. She used it to commute to work. In 1926 Heywood became a member of the Women’s Engineering Society and joined the council in 1928.

Heywood married Harold Heywood in 1932. She retired from work on her marriage and they had 3 children, Prof. John Heywood, Jennifer Clark, and Richard Heywood. She continued to be an active researcher and a member of the Women's Engineering Society and spoke at engineering conferences. She emphasised how women had been involved in engineering and metallurgy by pointing to the 1840 census which listed 469 female blacksmiths and 322 women smelters. Heywood also supported the education of women and contributed to the Central Employment Bureau girl's career guide on engineering. She was on the board of a variety of schools and colleges which included Bedford College and Dartford Technical College.

Heywood went on to become president of the Women's Engineering Society in 1948, succeeding Winifred Hackett and succeeded by Sheila Leather. She introduced fellow metallurgist Ella Mary Collin to the work of the organisation.

== Research ==
She wrote about her work at the company which she submitted to The Woman Engineer in 1927. She began to start on her PhD, about tin-based alloys in the 1930s and completed it in 1935. Her funding came from the International Tin Research and Development Association. Part of the finance came from John Horace Fry of Frys Metal Foundries. Her research was thought the definitive work on the interaction of white metal alloy composition with the process of casting and the influence of impurities in the alloys. With herphotomicrographs of etched samples Heywood demonstrated that liquid metal stratifies significantly in alloys such as type face metals. She published on her research and was widely cited.

She was a talented and prolific water color painter throughout her life. She took up oil painting in later life. Heywood died in 1994.
