= DSTC =

DSTC may refer to:

- Dartford Science & Technology College
- Distributed Systems Technology Centre, an Australian research organization
- Diplomatic Security Training Center, a training center for the U.S. Mobile Security Deployment
- Duluth State Teachers College, previous name of University of Minnesota Duluth
- Dynamic Stability and Traction Control, an electronic stability control and traction control system from Volvo
