= Miriam Violet Griffith =

British Electrical Engineer

- Born: 11 October 1911; Carlisle, England
- Died: 9 May 1989 (aged 77)
- Citizenship: British
- Education: Bedford College, London; University of London
- Scientific career
- Fields: Physics

Miriam Violet Griffith (11 October 1911 – 9 May 1989) was an electrical engineer, technical author and an early user of ground source heat pumps. She was an expert in the area of heat pumps and was elected a fellow of the Institute of Physics.

== Early life ==
Miriam Violet Griffith was born on 11 October 1911 in Carlisle, England, eldest daughter of Sarah (née Pearce) and Rev. Leopold David Griffith. By 1921 she lived at The Rectory, Silvington, Cleobury Mortimer, Shropshire with her parents, two sisters, one brother and a 15-year-old servant.

== Education ==
She attended Casterton School in Carnforth from 1921 - 1927 and then Cheltenham Ladies College for her final years of secondary education. Griffith obtained a degree in Physics from Bedford College, University of London. She was made a Fellow of the institute of Physics prior to 1949.

== Career ==
In 1935 Griffith was working at the British Electrical and Allied Industries Research Association Laboratories as a junior technical assistant and a colleague of Winifred Hackett. The same year she joined the Women's Engineering Society.

In 1948 she undertook research in heat pumps particularly ground-source heat pumps, considering impacts of a lower soil temperature on a kitchen garden. Robert C. Webber is credited as developing and building the first ground heat pump in the same year.

Griffith is recognised as being one of the first researchers in the field of ground-source heat pumps and coined the terminology Performance Energy Ratio (PER) to describe the system performance of a heat pump. When presenting her research in 1957 she proposed that PER was adopted as a common standard but there was some disagreement as an audience member commented that engineers are used "to thinking in terms of coefficient of performance" and as such the term did not persist.

Miriam Violet Griffith died on 9 May 1989.

== Bibliography ==
- Pre-Arcing Phenomena in Fuse Wires with Direct Current; Authors: H W Baxter; Miriam Violet Griffith; British Electrical and Allied Industries Research Association. Technical Report. Reference G/T 152, London, 1944.
- Voltage Distribution in Station Equipment subjected to High D.C. Test Voltages, Miriam Violet Griffith, British Electrical and Allied Industries Research Association. London, 1944.
- The Transient Warming of Rooms. Author: Miriam Violet Griffith, British Electrical and Allied Industries Research Association. Technical Report. Reference Y/T5. London, 1946.
- The Thermal Characteristics of a Concrete Floor Heated by Buried Cables. Miriam Violet Griffith, British Electrical and Allied Industries Research Association. Technical Report. London, 1947.
- The Effect of Cold Inflow Rate, Orifice Design and Storage Water Temperature on Stratification in Domestic Hot Water Storage Vessels. [With diagrams.] by Miriam Violet Griffith, British Electrical and Allied Industries Research Association. London 1947.
- The Calculation of Steady State Heat Flow through the Walls of Thermally-Insulated Bodies, with special reference to hot water storage vessels by Miriam Violet Griffith, British Electrical and Allied Industries Research Association. London 1947.
- The effect of surface material, surface finish, temperature of operation and water composition on the deposition of carbonate scale on electric immersion heaters of high specific loading. Authors; Miriam Violet Griffith; Honor Mary Browning, British Electrical & Allied Industries Research Association, 1951.
- The effect on electricity consumption of the layout of coal-electric water-heating systems. Miriam Violet Griffith, British Electrical & Allied Industries Research Association, 1951. Characteristics of a small heat pump installation. Authors: Miriam Violet Griffith; H J Eighteen, British Electrical and Allied Industries Research Association, 1952.
- The Shinfield heat pump. Interim report. Authors: Miriam Violet Griffith; H J Eighteen, British Electrical & Allied Industries Research Association, Technical reports series; Y/T20, 1952.
- Heat pump sources, and Heat transfer from soil to buried pipes. Miriam Violet Griffith, British Electrical & Allied Industries Research Association, 1952.
- Heat pump operation in Great Britain, Miriam Violet Griffith, British Electrical & Allied Industries Research Association, 1958.
- The Effect of Suspended Floor Structure on Off-Peak Floor Warming Performance. An electrical analogue study. [With plates.] Authors: B.G. Tunmore, and Miriam Violet Griffith, Publisher: British Electrical and Allied Industries Research Association, Leatherhead, 1962.
- The effect of carpets on the performance of floor warming systems, Miriam Violet Griffith, Leatherhead, Surrey, Electrical Research Association, 1965. ERA report, no. 5108.
