= William Mollison =

William Mollison may refer to:

- William Mollison (mathematician) (1851–1929), Scottish mathematician and academic
- William Mollison (politician) (1816–1886), Australian politician

== See also ==
- James William Mollison (1858–1927), British agriculturalist
