= Winifred Hackett =

English electrical and aeronautical engineer

- Born: 2 October 1906; Kings Norton, England
- Died: 3 June 1994 (aged 87)
- Occupation: Engineer

Winifred Hackett (2 October 1906 – 3 June 1994) was an English electrical and aeronautical engineer who worked on guided weapon systems and the DEUCE computer.

== Early life and education ==
Hackett was born in Kings Norton, an area of Birmingham on 2 October 1906.

She attended King Edward's Girls’ High School in Edgbaston, Birmingham. Hackett was an exceptional student and won a scholarship whilst at the school. She originally planned to study architecture and for a time attended UCL with this purpose, but decided to change academic direction, returning to Birmingham to study engineering instead.

In 1929, Hackett was the first woman to graduate from the University of Birmingham with an engineering degree, and won the prize for the 'Best Engineer in the University of Birmingham' in 1930. Hackett's academic success resulted in the award of the Bowen Scholarship for Electrical Engineering, which enabled her to stay on to earn an MSc. A further grant from the Institution of Electrical Engineers' War Thanksgiving Education and Research Fund in 1930 supported her a to earn a PhD on selenium cells, again at the University of Birmingham.

She then became an aeronautical engineer.

== Career ==
Hackett's first job was at the British Electrical and Allied Industries Research Association at Perivale and then Leatherhead, where she worked as a Junior Technical Assistant. During this time she was researching dielectrics and published a number of papers on dielectrics, capacitors and DC design. She encouraged colleagues, including Miriam Violet Griffith, to join the Women's Engineering Society.

By the 1950s, Hackett was head of the Guided Weapons Division at aerospace and defence company English Electric, working on Mathematical Physics, and based first in Luton and later in Stevenage. She was in charge of the DEUCE computer and its programming on punched cards and paper tape. The DEUCE was a commercialised version of Alan Turing’s ACE computer. of which 33 were sold and which had a library of over 1,000 programmes. The period when Hackett ran the guided weapons division also saw the development of the Thunderbird surface to air missile and other ballistic missiles.

In the early 1960s, Hackett joined the Manchester Business School as a Senior Research Fellow where she undertook statistical analysis. It was here that the future software designer Judy Butland became her mathematical assistant and computer.

== Memberships and personal life ==
Having been involved with the Women's Engineering Society since 1929, particularly the Manchester branch, in 1943 Hackett was elected to the governing council. In August that year she chaired a meeting which set up a branch in Birmingham, and shortly afterwards was elected vice president of the main organisation.

She became the President of the Women's Engineering Society (WES) in 1946, succeeding Margaret Partridge in the role. Hackett's successor as president was Frances Heywood.

In 1950, she and fellow senior WES members, Ira Rischowski and Sheila Leather published a report on equal pay for women in engineering, which concluded that there was "no justification for lower salary scales for women".

Hackett was a member of the Institution of Electrical Engineers.

Hackett's interests included fashion and the theatre, and very accurate map reading. Even in retirement, when her own health was suffering, she devised various aids for disabled people.

Winifred Hackett died in on 3 June 1994.

== Selected publications ==
- Hackett, Winifred; Morris Thomas, A. (1941). "The electric strength of mica and its variation with temperature". Journal of the Institution of Electrical Engineers - Part I: General. 88 (8): 295–303. doi:10.1049/ji-1.1941.0068.
- Austen, A.E.W.; Hackett, W. (1944). "Internal discharges in dielectrics: their observation and analysis". Journal of the Institution of Electrical Engineers - Part I: General. 91 (44): 298–312. doi:10.1049/ji-1.1944.0073.

== External Sites ==
http://www.magnificentwomen.co.uk/engineer-of-the-week/88-winifred-hackett
