= Harold Mann =

Harold Mann may refer to:

- Harold Mann (swimmer) (born 1942), American swimmer and Olympic champion
- Harold Mann (Australian footballer) (born 1940), former Australian rules footballer
- Harold Mann (boxer) (1938–2016), Canadian boxer
- Harold Hart Mann (1872–1961), English chemist, bacteriologist, and agricultural scientist

== See also ==
- Harry Mann, police officer and politician
