= John Leather =

John Leather may refer to:

- John Walter Leather, agricultural chemist
- John Towlerton Leather, British civil engineering contractor
