= Mahmut Özdemir =

German politician

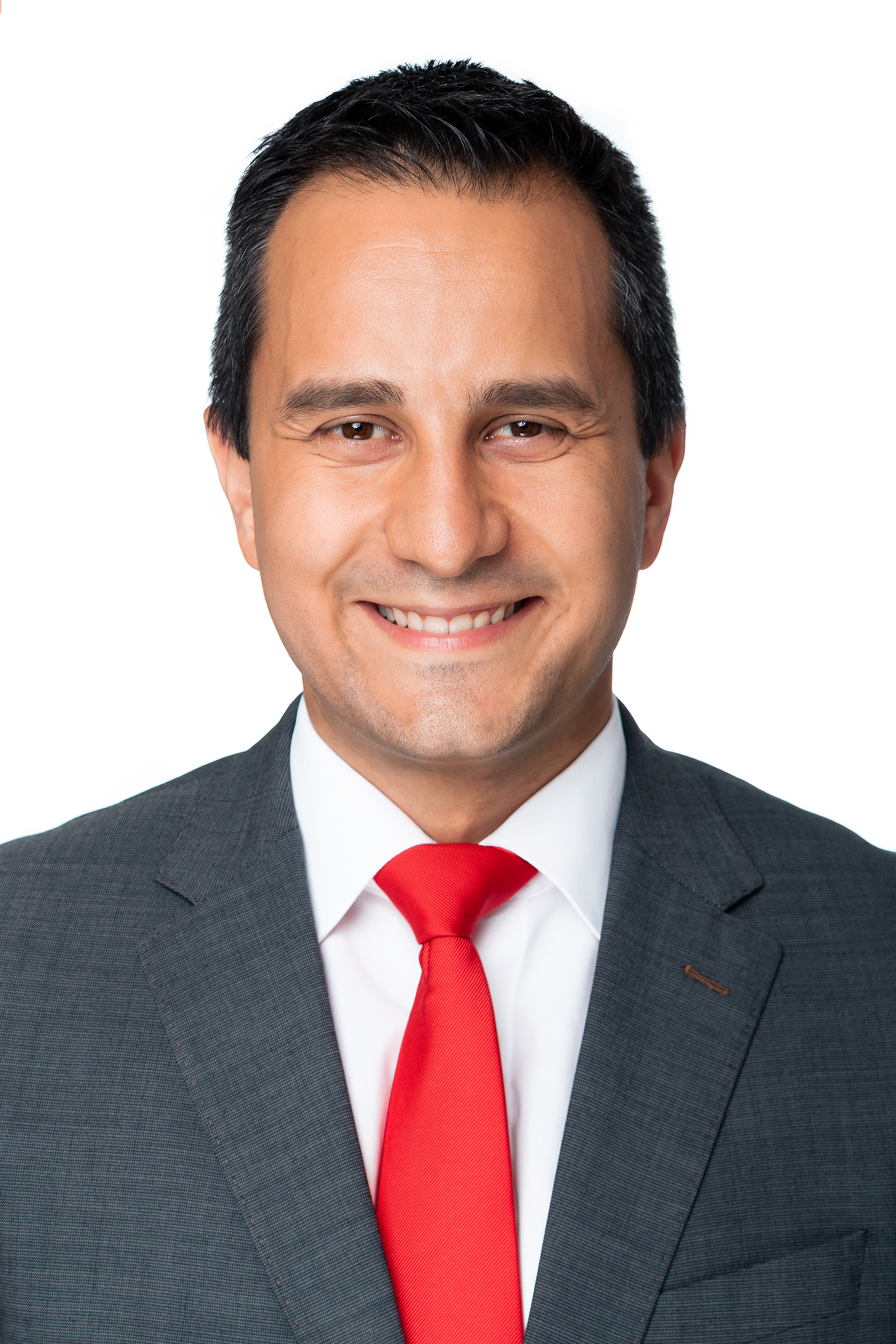
- Özdemir in 2021

Member of the Bundestag
- Incumbent
- Assumed office 2013

Personal details
- Born: 23 June 1987 (age 39) Duisburg, Germany
- Citizenship: German
- Party: Social Democratic Party of Germany (SPD)
- Education: University of Düsseldorf
- Occupation: Politician
- Profession: Jurist

Mahmut Özdemir (born 23 June 1987 in Duisburg, Germany) is a German politician for the Social Democratic Party of Germany (SPD) who has been a member of the Bundestag since 2013, representing the Duisburg II district.

In addition to his parliamentary work, Özdemir served as Parliamentary State Secretary in the Federal Ministry of the Interior and Community in the coalition government of Chancellor Olaf Scholz from 2021 to 2025.

== Early life and education ==
Özdemir was born on 23 June 1987, in Duisburg's Homberg district, Germany, to Turkish parents Zeki and Aynur, who emigrated from Turkey as "guest workers". After finishing high school with Abitur, he studied law at the University of Düsseldorf, graduating in 2011. He was then employed at the district court in Düsseldorf as a jurist trainee. He spent his whole life in his hometown even during his university years.

== Political career ==
=== Career in local politics ===
Özdemir joined the SPD in 2001 at the age of fourteen, and was active in the Young Socialists in the SPD (Jusos) organization. Özdemir climbed up to the top position in the regional organization of the party in Homberg. In the regional elections of 2009, he became a member of the city council in his hometown Duisburg.

=== Member of the German Parliament, 2013–present ===
With the declaration of Johannes Pflug, a foreign policy expert of the SPD in the Bundestag, to resign from active politics and not to run again for the 2013 federal election, the party nominated Özdemir as the direct candidate for Duisburg II. He won a seat in the Bundestag as the youngest member of parliament. In parliament, he served on the Committee on Internal Affairs (2013–2021) and its Sub-Committee on Municipal Affairs (2014–2017). In 2018, he joined the Sports Committee as well as a parliamentary inquiry on the 2016 Berlin truck attack.

In addition to his committee assignments, Özdemir has served as deputy chairman of the Parliamentary Friendship Group for Relations with Arabic-Speaking States in the Middle East (since 2018), which is in charge of maintaining inter-parliamentary relations with Bahrain, Iraq, Yemen, Jordan, Qatar, Kuwait, Lebanon, Oman, Saudi Arabia, Syria, United Arab Emirates and the Palestinian territories. From 2014 until 2017, he held the same position in the Parliamentary Friendship Group for Relations with the States of Central Asia (Kazakhstan, Kyrgyzstan, Uzbekistan, Tajikistan, Turkmenistan). He is also a member of the German-Turkish Parliamentary Friendship Group and the German-Swiss Parliamentary Friendship Group.

Within his parliamentary group, Özdemir belongs to the Seeheim Circle. He has also been member of the working group on municipal policies since 2014.

In the negotiations to form a so-called traffic light coalition of the SPD, the Green Party and the Free Democrats (FDP) following the 2021 German elections, Özdemir was part of his party's delegation in the working group on homeland security, civil rights and consumer protection, co-chaired by Christine Lambrecht, Konstantin von Notz and Wolfgang Kubicki.

== Other activities ==
- Stiftung Forum Recht, Member of the Board of Trustees (since 2022)
- Business Forum of the Social Democratic Party of Germany, Member of the Political Advisory Board (since 2020)
- Rotary International, Member (since 2017)
- Federal Agency for Civic Education, Member of the Board of Trustees (since 2014)
- MSV Duisburg, Member (since 2013)
- IG Bergbau, Chemie, Energie (IG BCE), Member (since 2010)
