= Kathleen Mary Cook =

British mechanical engineer

- Born: 25 August 1910; Wembley, England
- Died: 1971 (aged 60–61)
- Citizenship: British
- Education: La Convent of the Sainte Union des Sacres Coeurs, North London
- Occupation: Mechanical Engineer
- Employer(s): Apprentice at Hercules Engineering Company; Director of Hercules Aircraft Construction Co. Ltd; Founder member of Universal Equipment Co. Ltd; Owner of Kainder Ltd; Wilmer Engineering Co Ltd
- Organization: Women's Engineering Society
- Spouse: Dennis Goodwin

Kathleen Mary Cook (25 August 1910–1971) was a mechanical engineer who was president of the Women's Engineering Society from 1955–1956. Her father, P. V. Cook, who was also a mechanical engineer, worked with the earliest aeroplane engines.

== Early life and education ==
Kathleen Mary Cook was born in Wembley on 25 August 1910. She educated at La Convent of the Sainte Union des Sacres Coeurs in North London and in Paris. In 1928 she became an apprentice at Hercule Engineering Company, London, her father's company, where she stayed for 7 years, completing her apprenticeship in 1933.

== Career ==
During the Second World War, Cook and three of her brothers set up and ran a factory in Northholt, where they developed gun breech mechanisms and spare parts for aircraft. As a result of a government requested reorganisation, which Cook played a significant role in, production increased tenfold in four months. Cook remained in this role until the end of the war in 1945.

In 1942 Cook became director of Hercules Aircraft Construction Co Ltd, and was a founder member of Universal Equipment Co Ltd, which was established in 1945. She invented and patented a mobile bed called the Kainder Mobile Bed and set up a company called Kainder Ltd in 1949.

In 1951 she joined Wilman Engineering Co. Ltd, a small company making electronic equipment and automatic control units. She worked as chief mechanical engineer and chairman of the company, and helped it to survive financial difficulties. After raising capital, she was able to buy out her partners in the company and begin modernisation.

In 1962, she was one of only ten women to achieve Chartership as a Mechanical Engineer.

== Professional memberships ==
Cook was a fellow of the Institute of Production Engineering. She became a student member of the Institution of Mechanical Engineers, after being introduced by Verena Holmes. Holmes also proposed her as a full member many years later in 1955, with Caroline Haslett acting as an application referee. Cook was only the second woman, following Holmes, to hold full membership since it was set up in 1847. She was also the first female fellow of the Institute of British Foundrymen, and a member of the British Nuclear Society and the Royal Commonwealth Society.

Cook joined the Women's Engineering Society (WES) in 1931. She joined the Council in 1936, on which she served for over 25 years. She became Vice-President in 1951 and was President from 1955-56. She succeeded Dorothy Pile in the role and was in turn succeeded by Marjorie Bell. In her 1955 presidential address she talked about her work as a mechanical engineer in production and how an engineering plant is run.

She wrote a number of articles for the WES journal called The Woman Engineer, including one in 1935 reporting on a Shipping Engineering and Machinery Exhibition. She also produced a report on the inauguration of the Marchwood Power Station at which Princess Margaret officiated. She was appointed advertising manager of The Woman Engineer in 1953.

== Personal life ==
Kathleen Cook married D H I Goodwin, a marine engineer, in 1957.

She died in 1971 following a long illness.
