= Dorothy Pile =

British metallurgist

Dorothy Lilian Pile
- Born: 26 July 1902
- Died: 1 February 1993 (aged 90)
- Occupation: Metallurgist

Dorothy Lilian Pile (26 July 1902 – 1 February 1993) was a British metallurgist, first woman to be admitted to the Institution of Metallurgists and past president of the Women's Engineering Society.

== Early life ==
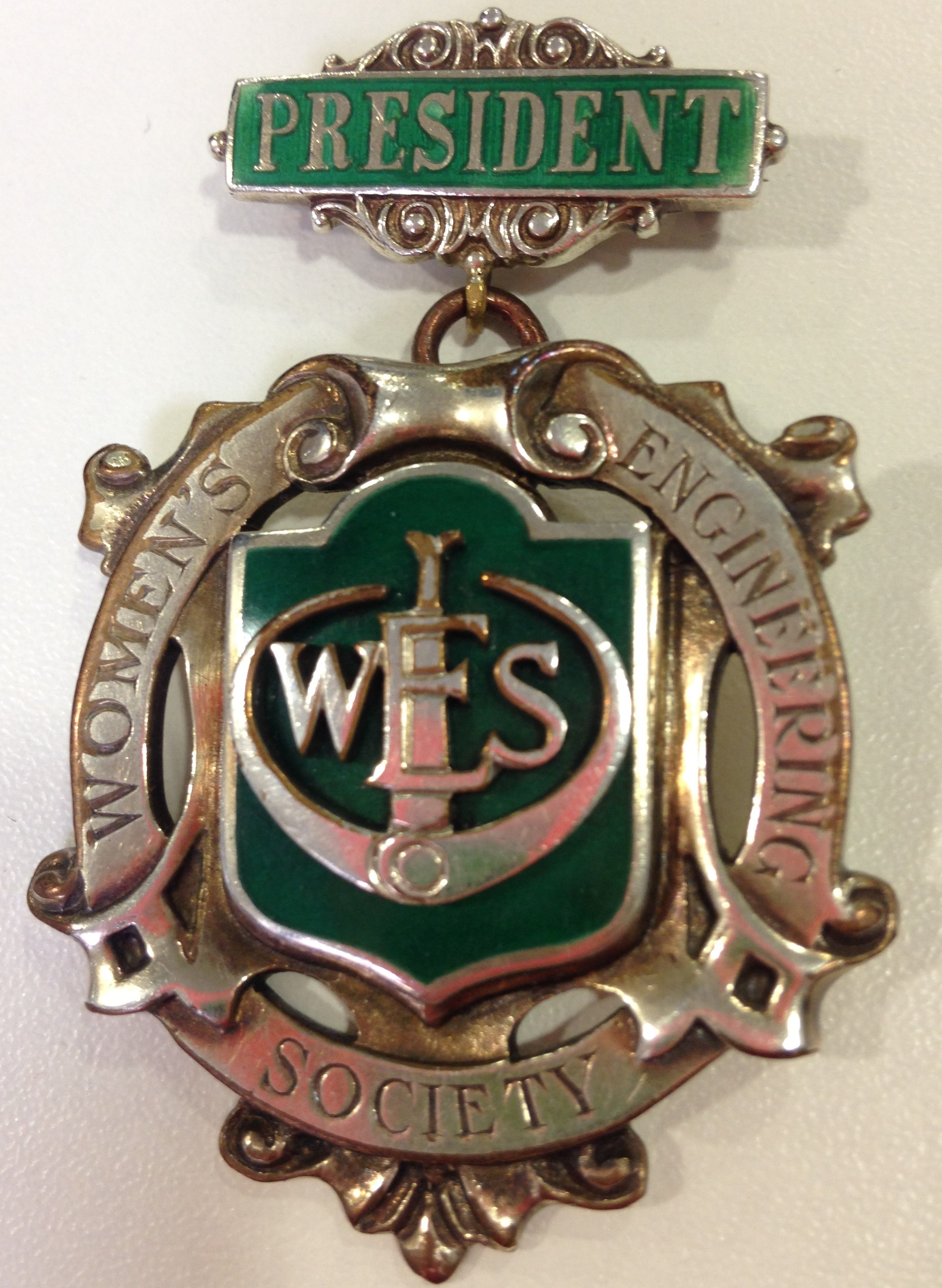
WES President's Medal given by Dorothy Pile (front)

Dorothy Lilian Pile was born in Yorkshire on 26 July 1902.

== Career ==
In 1920 Pile's first job was as at the Midland Laboratory Guild Ltd. where her father was the chief metallurgist. Her role was in the chemical laboratory as an assistant working on physical testing and metallography before she became more involved in sheet metal research.

In 1949, Pile was appointed as a metallurgist at the Design and Research Centre of the Gold, Silver and Jewellery Trade, in London and later became an industrial liaison officer.

== Professional memberships ==
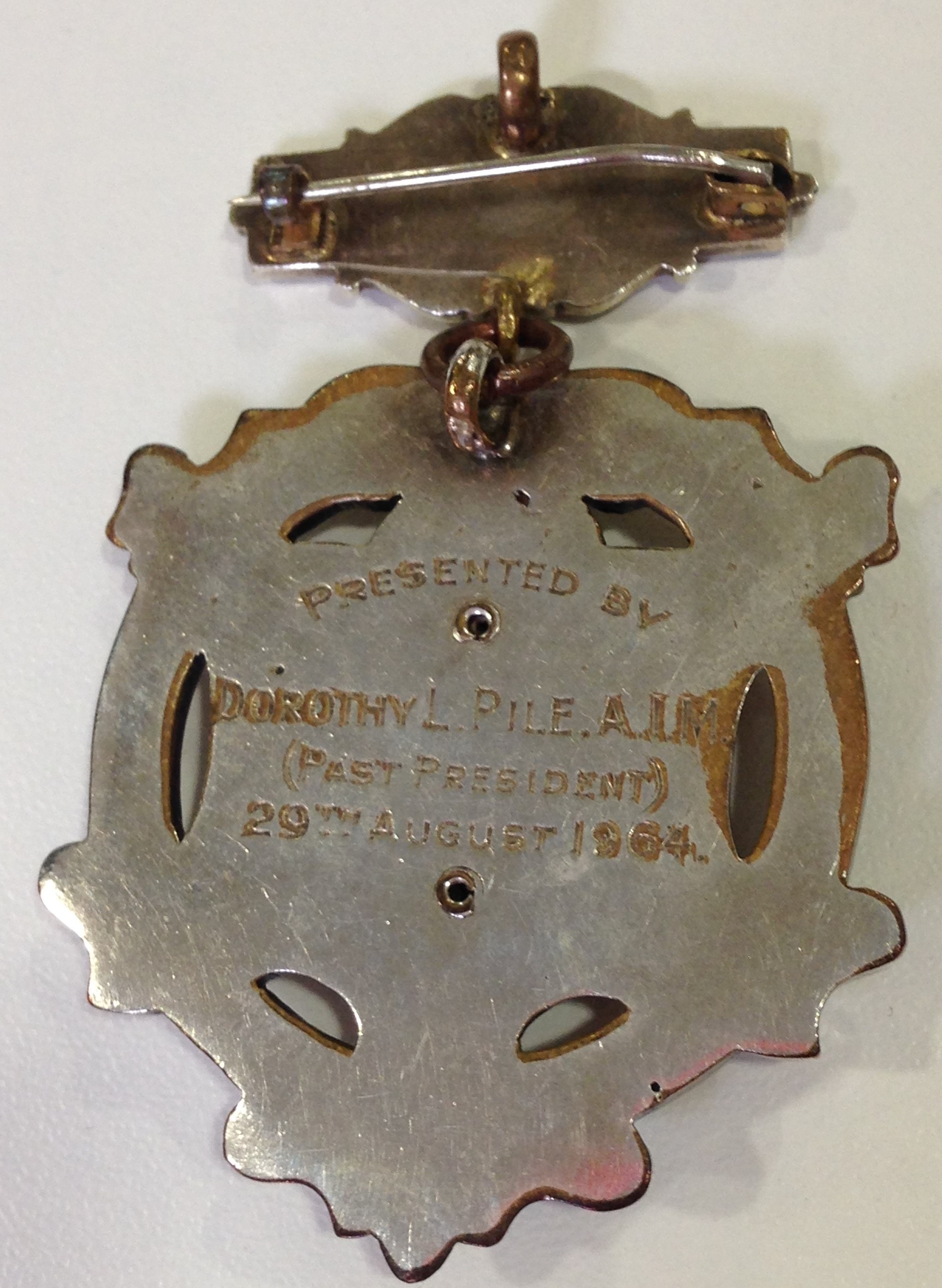
WES President's Medal back showing dedication by Dorothy Pile

Pile was the first woman to become a member of the Institution of Metallurgists in 1946. Later in 1983 she also became the first woman to be awarded honorary fellowship. As a thank you she presented the institution with a presidential tankard which is still held by the IOM3 Historical Collection.

Pile was an active member of the Birmingham Metallurgical Association and in 1949 she was elected president. Pile was the first woman to become president of any British metallurgical societies.

Pile became the president of the Women's Engineering Society (WES) in 1954, succeeding Ella Mary Collin in the role. Pile's successor as president was Kathleen Mary Cook. Pile presented WES with a President's Medal on 29th August 1964, featuring the organisation's logo at the time in green enamel.

Pile had various other roles and memberships to industrial societies and would often be the only woman in attendance at society dinners. She is known to have been referred to as the "metallurgical aunt" at such events.
