= Judy Butland =

British engineering software designer (1940–2019)

- Born: Judy Whiteley; 6 October 1940; Leeds
- Died: January 2019 (aged 78)
- Education: Cockburn High School, University of Manchester College of Science and Technology
- Occupation: Engineering Software Designer
- Spouse: David Butland

Judy Butland (née Whiteley) (6 October 1940 - 2019) was a British engineering software designer who pioneered the use of computers at universities. She was recognised in 2019 as an Engineer of the Week by the Women's Engineering Society.

== Early life and education ==
Judy Whiteley was born on 6 October 1940 in Leeds, the daughter of Gordon Whiteley, a draughtsman, and Margaret Whiteley, a seamstress. She suffered from arthritis all her life and from the age of 12 to 14, was confined to bed at Wharfedale children's hospital in Menston, with little communication with her family and no information from her doctors. She never talked about her illness.

She studied for a degree in mathematics at the Manchester College of Science and Technology, but although she completed three years of study she found the lectures boring and did not complete her degree.

== Career ==
Butland's first position was at the Associated Electrical Industries, Manchester, Information and Exchange section, where she worked as a technical abstractor, producing summaries of technical articles and papers from engineering and science publications.

In 1967 she went to work at the Manchester Business School as Mathematical Assistant to Winifred Hackett, an aeronatutical engineer. She worked, amongst other things, on scheduling workflows for aeroplane production. The project entailed statistical analysis, which required complex calculations, so Hackett sent Butland to lectures on the principles of computing, which led to Butland's career in software engineering. She advised other groups in the Business School on computing, including working with the librarian to automate the classification of publications.

Butland left this post to work at the University of Bradford, Postgraduate School of Electrical and Electronic Engineering, improving the quality of programming in research projects. She was awarded an M.Phil. for her thesis describing tools she developed to produce technical charts from research data.

Butland set up her own company, Bradford University Software Services (BUSS), to sell a software package, SimplePlot, which she developed. The proceeds from sales of the software were used to help support the department's work.

== Publications ==
Butland published a number of academic papers, including one on drawing a smooth curve through a set of data points, which became known as Butland's algorithm.

== Personal life ==
In 1964 Judy Butland was married to David Butland who she met at the University of Manchester. They had one son, Philip.

Butland's funeral was held on Wednesday 2 January 2019, at the Salvation Army, Bridlington, Yorkshire.

== Recognition ==
Butland was appointed posthumously, in October 2019, as Engineer of the Week No 89 by the Women's Engineering Society.
