= Ella Mary Collin =

Metallurgist and educationalist; engineer

- as WES President
- Born: 15 July 1903; Essex, England
- Died: 1 February 1973 (aged 69)
- Education: B.Sc. Chemistry; Ph.D. Metallurgical Chemistry
- Occupations: Metallurgical Chemist; Inspector of Schools
- Employer(s): British Launderers Research Association; HM Inspector of Schools
- Organization: Women's Engineering Society

Ella Mary Collin (15 July 1903 – 1 February 1973) was a metallurgical chemist who worked in research for the British Launderer's Research Association, as well as in education. She was President of the Women's Engineering Society (WES), after holding a number of roles in its London branch.

== Education ==
Collin received an honours degree from King's College London and continued to study metallurgy further at the Sir John Cass Technical Institute. It was here she met Frances Heywood who introduced her to the work of the Women's Engineering Society. She did part time research for several years on the subject of impurities in ores and metals, for which she received a Ph.D. from London.

== Career ==
Collins first worked at a firm of Analytical and Consulting Chemists, then in 1945 joined the staff of the British Launderer's Research Association where she worked first as the Director of Research and then as Education Officer. In 1949 she was appointed an Inspector of Schools in the Technical and Further Education branch.

== Roles in professional societies ==
Collin was elected a Fellow of the Royal Institute of Chemistry after completing her Ph.D. She joined the Women's Engineering Society (WES) in 1934 and was Secretary (1946-47) and then Chairman (1947–49) of the London Branch of the WES, which she helped to set up in 1946. During the year of her chairmanship, the London branch held 9 branch meetings, with talks on various subjects including Equality of Status, Ultrasonics and Starting an Engineering business, and 6 visits, including to the J. Lyons food factory and the X-ray department at St Bartholomew's Hospital. Also during her chairmanship, there was a mass meeting at Westminster Central Hall in 1948, where more than 1000 women demonstrated to demand equal pay for equal work. The Annual General Meeting of the WES London Branch was postponed so that members could attend.

Collin was president of the WES from 1951-52. Her presidential address at the WES conference in 1953 was on the development of technical education. In her role as president she spoke out about technical education in schools. Collin succeeded Sheila Leather in the role and was succeeded by Dorothy Pile, another metallurgist. She was also involved in the national and international federations of Business and Professional women's clubs.

Collin was a keen cook and took many classes in the subject, achieving a first class City and Guilds certificate in the subject.
