= Claud Mackenzie Hutchinson =

English bacteriologist (1869–1941)

Claud Mackenzie Hutchinson CIE (29 April 1869 – 2 August 1941) was an English bacteriologist who worked in India as Imperial Agricultural Bacteriologist.

Hutchinson studied at Trinity College, Glenalmond before going to St. John's College, Cambridge graduating in 1891. He taught chemistry at the Colonial College, Hollesley and in 1904 he joined the Indian Tea Association in Assam. He succeeded Harold Hart Mann in 1907 as scientific officer. In 1909 he became Imperial Agricultural Bacteriologist at Pusa and retired in 1926 and joined the Imperial Chemical Industries in 1931.

His work in India was principally on soil nutrients and fertility. He worked on bacterial nitrogen fixation, green manures and humus. His work on green manure fermentation stimulated the work of R.D. Anstead and Gilbert Fowler. He also worked on other agricultural issues including the pebrine disease of silkworm, bacteriology in indigo fermentation and in the sterilization of water using chlorine. He was also a skilled photographer and his interest in golf made him an advisor for turf management. For his work, he was conferred CIE in 1920.

He married Alice Muriel, daughter of J. Walter Leather in 1914. Through this marriage his sisters in law were engineer and business woman Sheila Leather, and Wenonah Hardwick Leather, who married Eric Cecil Ansorge.
