= Eric Cecil Ansorge =

British officer and amateur entomologist (1887–1977)

Sir Eric Cecil Ansorge, CSI, CIE, FRES (6 March 1887 – 3 January 1977) was a British Indian Civil Service officer who worked in Orissa and Bihar in India. He was also a keen amateur entomologist, writing an official report on silk industry along with Harold Maxwell-Lefroy while in India apart from making collections of beetles and butterflies. He was knighted upon his retirement in 1946.

Ansorge was born in England, the son of explorer naturalist William John Ansorge who had just moved from Mauritius to England. He was educated at St. Paul's School after which he went to St. John's College, Oxford, qualifying the Indian Civil Services in 1911. He worked in Orissa, Bihar, and was posted Commissioner for the Andaman Islands but did not serve there due to the Japanese occupation of the islands. While in India, he coauthored a report on the silk industry along with Harold Maxwell-Lefroy. He also briefly served in Nyasaland. He returned to England from India in 1946 and lived at Chalfont-St.-Peter where he began to examine the local lepidoptera intensively. In 1969 he published the Macrolepidoptera of Buckinghamshire. His collections were bequeathed to the Aylesbury Museum. He also left money for an Ansorge Award set up by the Amateur Entomologists' Society.

Ansorge married Wenonah Hardwick Leather, daughter of John Walter Leather in 1915 at Pusa.

Through this marriage his sisters in law were engineer and businesswoman Sheila Leather, and Alice Muriel Hitchinson, wife of Claud Mackenzie Hutchinson.
