= Voelcker =

Voelcker(s)/Völcker(s) (or Volcker) is a surname. Notable people with the surname include:

- Augustus Voelcker (1822–1884), German-born English agricultural chemist
- Otto Voelckers (1888–1957), German architect and technical author
- Francis William Voelcker (1896–1954), British army officer
- John Augustus Voelcker (1854–1937), English agricultural chemist and son of Augustus Voelcker
- Paul Völckers (1891–1946), German general
- John Voelcker (1927–1972), British architect and designer
- Paul Volcker (1927–2019), American economist, former Federal Reserve Chairman
- Herbert Voelcker (1930–2020), American sports shooter, professor and engineer
