= Gerardus Johannes Mulder =

Dutch biochemist (1802–1880)

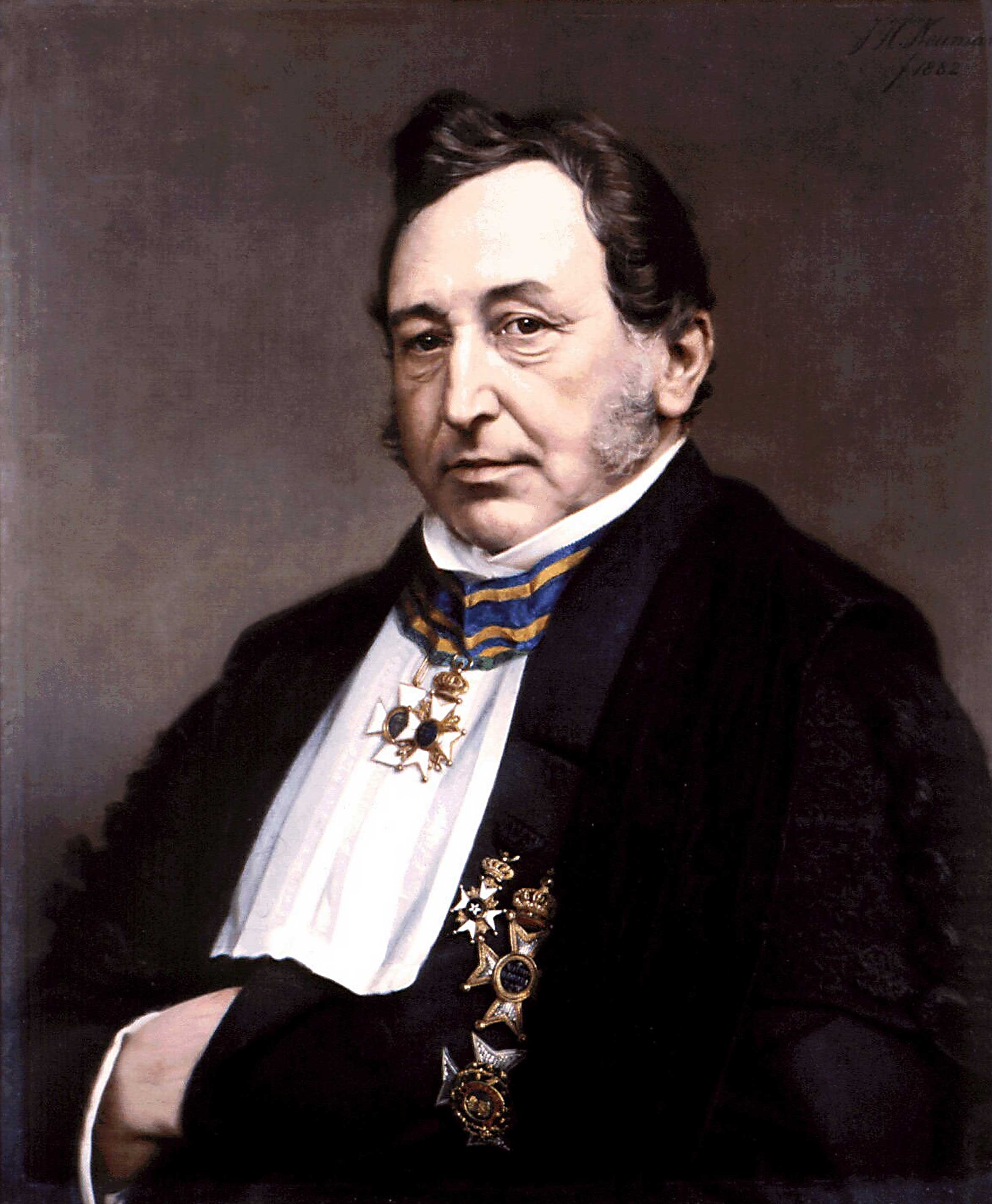
- Born: 27 December 1802; Utrecht
- Died: 18 April 1880 (aged 77); Bennekom
- Education: Utrecht University
- Known for: The concept of Protein
- Spouse: Wilhelmina van Rossem (m. 1827)
- Children: 6, including Eduard
- Scientific career
- Fields: Chemistry
- Workplaces: Utrecht University
- Thesis: Dissertatio medica de opio ejusque principiis, actione inter se comparatis (1825)
- Doctoral advisor: Nicolaas Cornelis de Fremery
- Doctoral students: Hendrik Cornelis Dibbits; Nicolaas Wilhelm Pieter Rauwenhoff

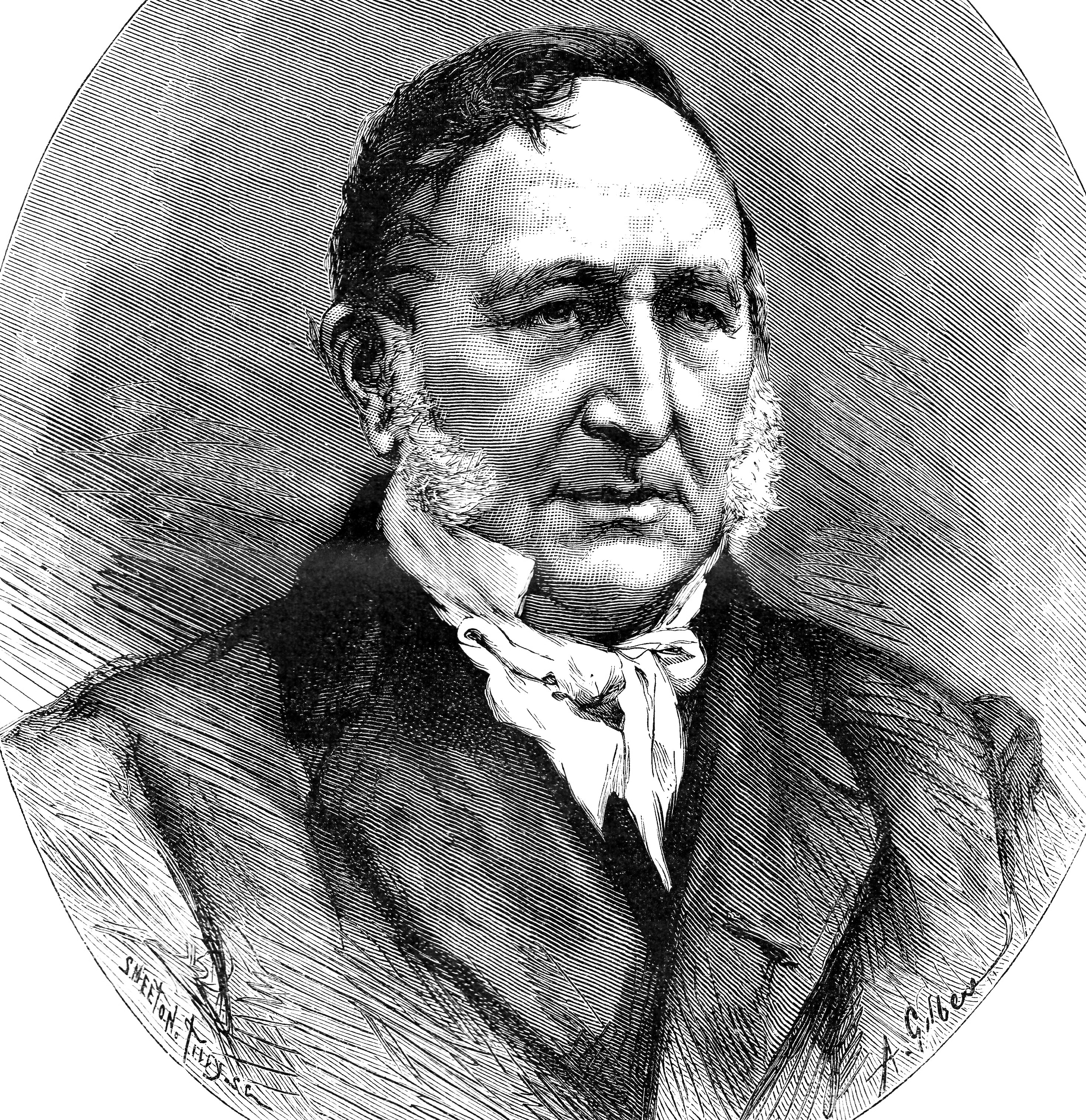
Gerardus Johannes Mulder.

Gerardus Johannes Mulder or Gerrit Jan Mulder (27 December 1802 – 18 April 1880) was a Dutch organic and analytical chemist.

== Life ==
Mulder was born in Utrecht and earned a medical degree from Utrecht University.

He became a reader of chemistry in Rotterdam and in 1840 he was appointed professor at Utrecht University.

=== Protein ===
Following a suggestion by Jöns Jacob Berzelius, Mulder used the term protein in his 1838 paper, "On the composition of some animal substances" (originally in French but translated in 1839 to German). In the same publication, he also proposed that animals draw most of their protein from plants.

Mulder "was the first to propose a theory concerning the causes of the differences between albumin, casein, and fibrin, and other substances more or less similar to them in physical properties and in their chemical behavior when exposed to reagents. Analyses of these substances showed that their percentage contribution with respect to carbon, hydrogen, nitrogen and oxygen were so similar as to suggest that they contain one common radical." This radical, a macromolecule, had formula $\ce{C20 H31 N5 O12 ,}$ and was known as protein. The variations in albuminous substances were attributed to peripheral bonds of protein to sulfur and/or phosphorus. Justus Liebig and his students sought to determine the structure of proteins, but until the methods of Emil Fischer and Franz Hofmeister became available, the amino acid decompositions were unknown.

Augustus Voelcker was Mulder's assistant for a year from 1846.

In 1850, Mulder was elected a foreign member of the Royal Swedish Academy of Sciences. He died in Bennekom.
