= Sheila Leather =

- Born: 17 January 1898; Birkenhead
- Died: 27 January 1983 (aged 85); Caenby, Lincolnshire
- Occupations: engineer, teacher, trainer

Sheila Leather (17 January 1898 - 27 January 1983) was an engineer, business owner and president of the Women's Engineering Society in 1950–51.

== Early life ==
Sheila Leather was born in Birkenhead, Cheshire on 17 January 1898 to Annie (née Lyon) and John Walter Leather, an analytical chemist. She had two sisters, Alice Muriel born in 1889 and Wenonah Hardwick born in 1890. Her father was the head of the chemical department at the Imperial Agricultural Research Institute established in 1904 at Pusa in Bihar, India.

Leather was a boarder at Liverpool High School for Girls in 1911, and it is assumed both her older sisters were in India with their father, as Alice Muriel married Claud Mews Mackenzie Hutchinson in 1914. Her other sister Wenonah Hardwick married Eric Cecil Ansorge in 1915. Both weddings took place in Pusa.

== Career ==
Before the Second World War Leather was a Physical Training Lecturer at Hockerill Teacher Training College, Bishop Stortford Hertfordshire, having trained in the revolutionary Bergman-Österberg method of exercise for women, probably at Madame Bergman-Osterberg's Dartford College.

Leather was an amateur engineer in 1940 and was one of the first women trainees to attend the courses run by the Women's Engineering Society held at the Beaufoy Institute in Lambeth to prepare women for engineering war work. She showed such aptitude at the Hawker aircraft factory where she was sent (working on Typhoons and Hawker Tempests) that she was promoted from the shopfloor to more responsible posts in production planning. In March 1943 she was recruited by the UK government's Ministry of Labour to be one of its Women Technical Officers advising on the employment of women in heavy industry, and was posted for some time to Newcastle upon Tyne. She went on to train others in people management and supervision skills, being appointed a TWI (Training Within Industry) Trainer in 1944.

Along with another WES member, Verena Holmes, Leather set up a small engineering company, Holmes & Leather Ltd, in Gillingham, Kent in 1946 employing only women to make small paper-cutting guillotines that could be used safely in schools. Both of her sisters had invested in the company.

== Women's Engineering Society ==
She joined the Women's Engineering Society (WES) in 1941 and became a regular contributor to The Woman Engineer magazine, and taking part in a broadcast to America about her work in 1942. She was elected to the WES Council in September 1942 and Vice President alongside Elsie Eleanor Verity in 1947.

In 1950-51 Leather was elected president of the Women's Engineering Society succeeding Frances Heywood in the role. She campaigned for equal pay in the sector and visited schools to encourage girls to take up engineering as a profession. In 1950, she, Winifred Hackett and Ira Rischowski published a report on equal pay for women in engineering, which concluded that there was "no justification for lower salary scales for women".

In 1951 she spoke on training in industry at the conference of the Women's Engineering Society, on BBC Woman's Hour and joined the equal pay committee of the British Federation of Business and Professional Women, thenbeing elected Vice Chair of the organisation. Leather hosted Beatrice Hicks, President of the recently formed American Society of Women Engineers when she visited the Festival of Britain. Leather was succeeded as WES President by Ella Mary Collin.

== Later life ==
In retirement she enjoyed acting as a volunteer guide in Lincoln Cathedral.

Sheila Leather died aged 85, at the Caenby Nursing Home in Lincolnshire on 27 January 1983.
