= Homberg/Ruhrort/Baerl =

Stadtbezirk in Duisburg, Germany

Coordinates: 51.4506°N 6.7092°E

Homberg/Ruhrort/Baerl (German pronunciation: [ˌhɔmbɛʁkˌʁuːɐ̯ʔɔʁtˈbaːɐ̯l]) is a Stadtbezirk (borough/district) within the city of Duisburg, Germany. The population is 39 725 and the district has an area of 37.1 km^{2} (as of December 31, 2014). It consists of the districts of Alt-Homberg, Hochheide, Baerl and Ruhrort.

The municipality was created in 1975 after the local government reform of parts of the left-bank community Rheinkamp-Baerl on the Lower Rhine and the Rhine district of Duisburg-Ruhrort. In the municipality is the largest part of the Duisburg inland port Duisport.

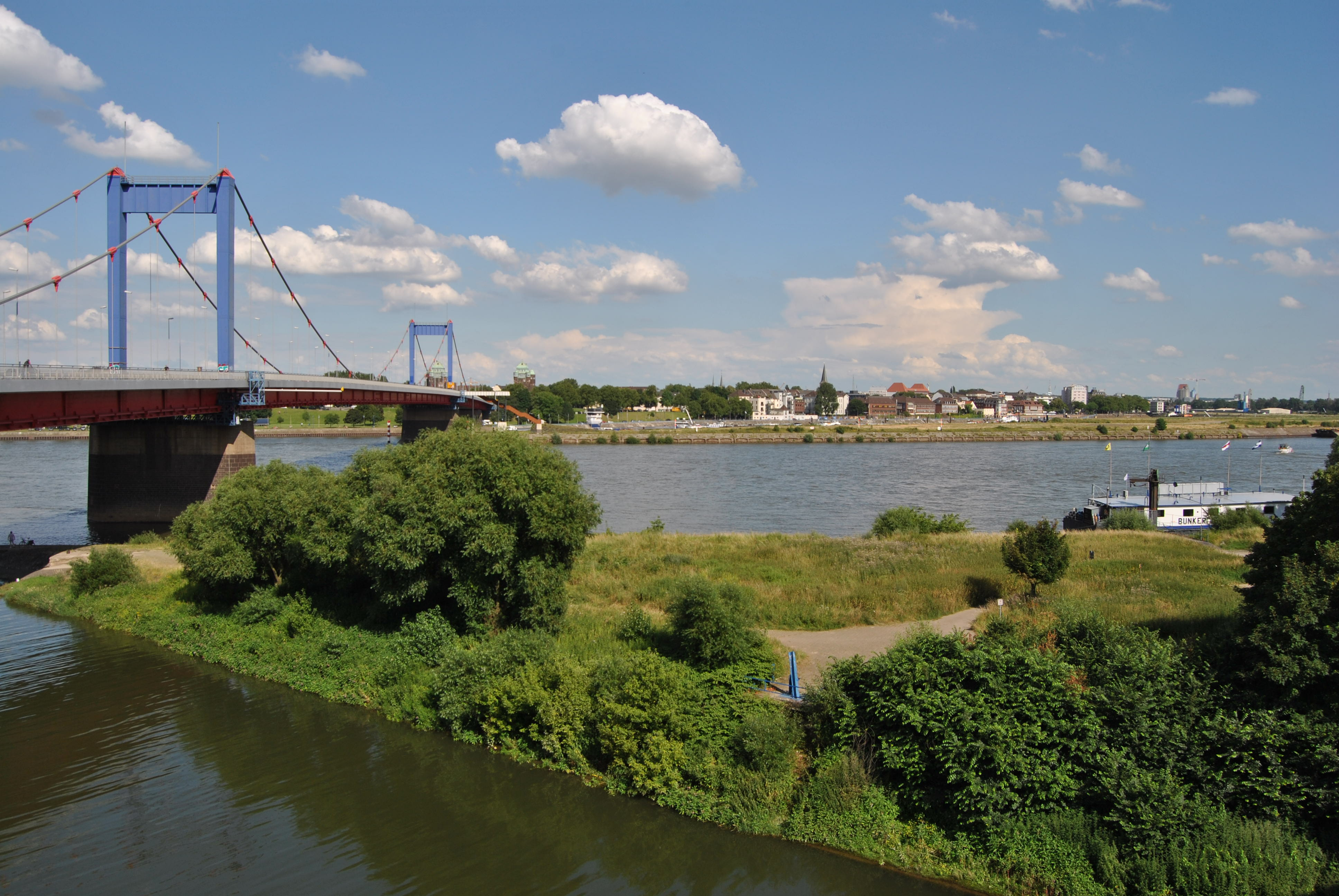
Friedrich Ebert Bridge

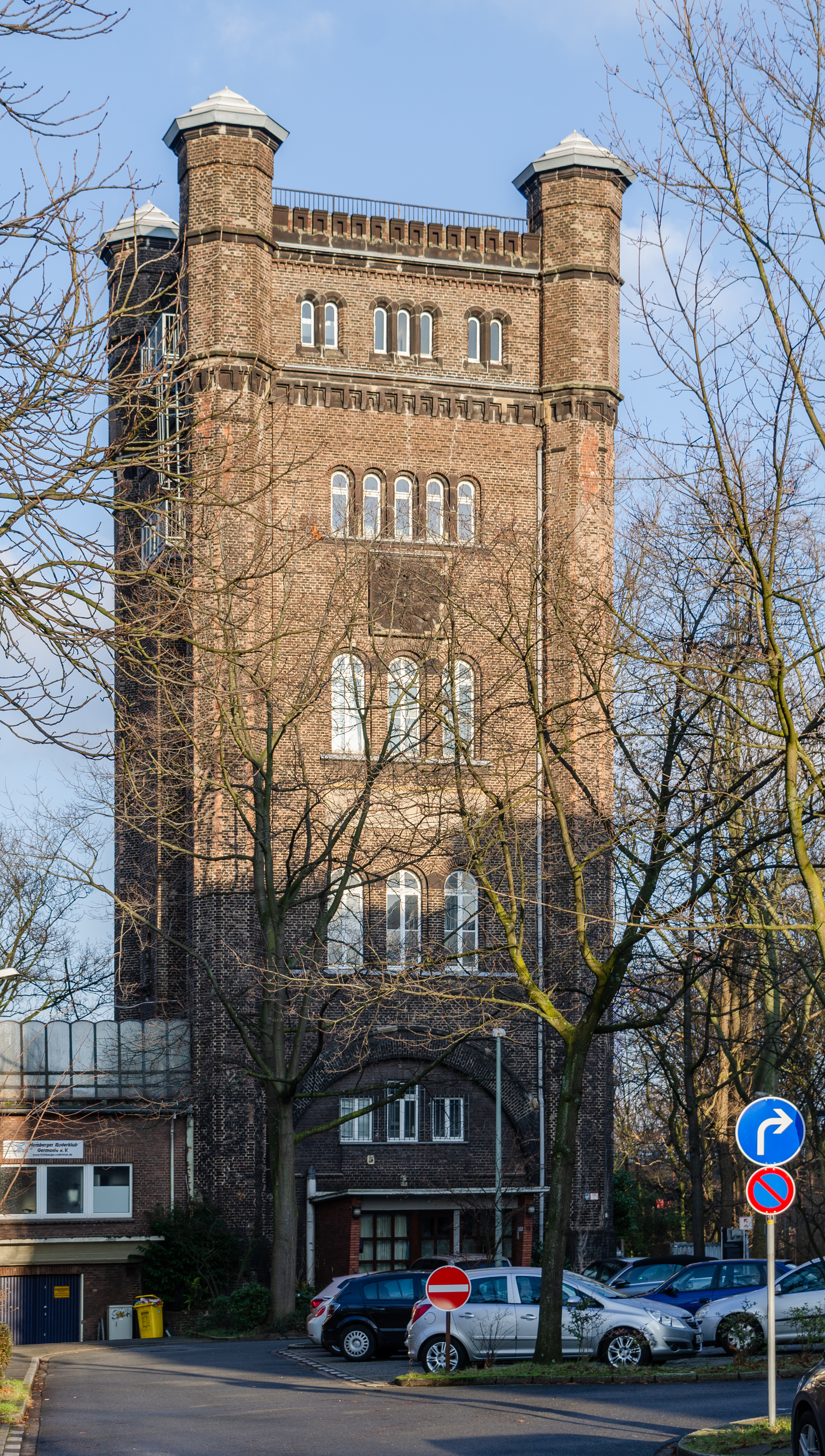
Tower of the former Ruhrort–Homberg train ferry

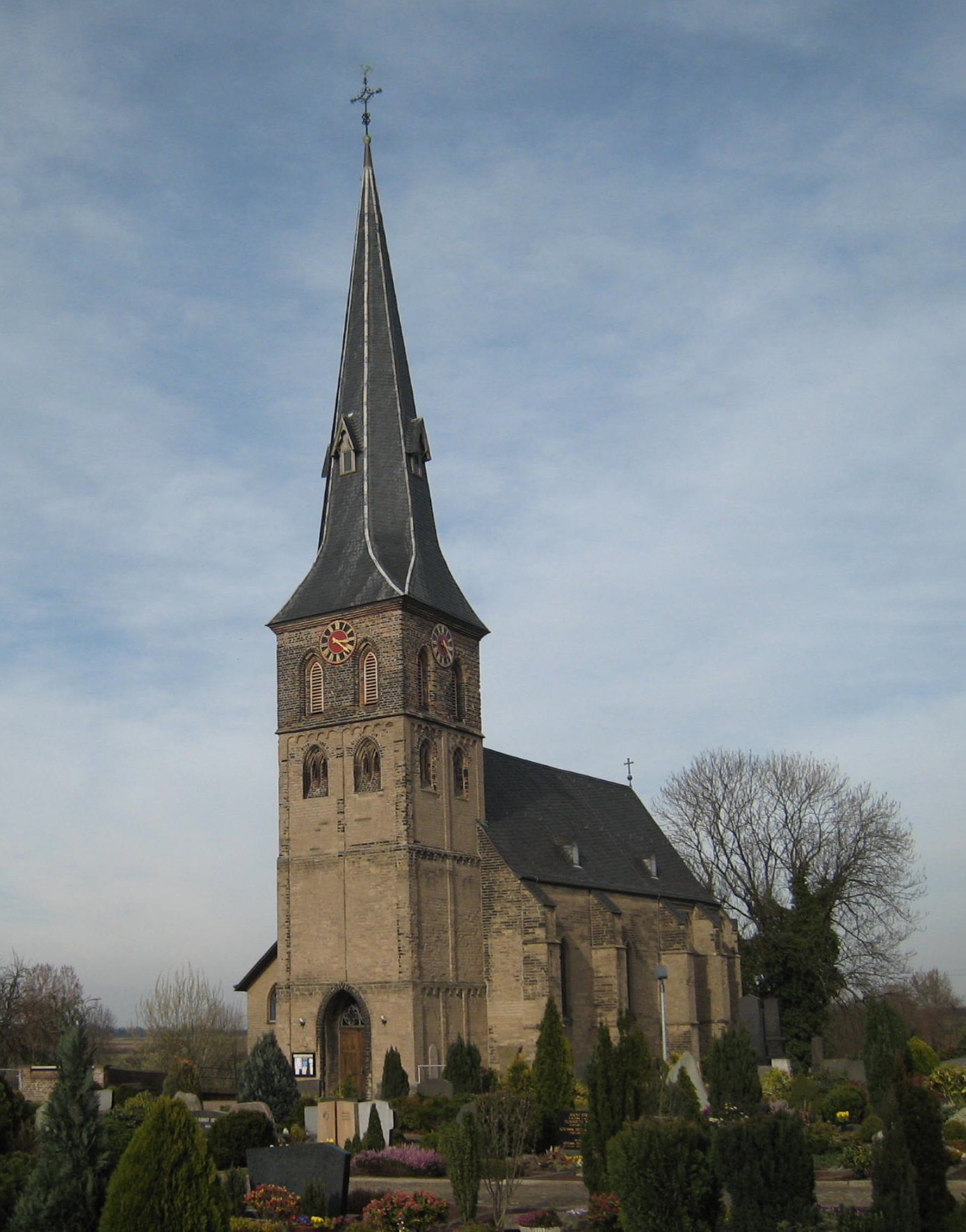
Baerl Protestant Church
