= Voelker =

Voelker is a surname. Notable people with the surname include:

- Bobby Voelker (born 1979), American mixed martial artist
- Christopher Voelker (born 1961), American photographer
- Elke Voelker (born 1968), German organist and musicologist
- Heidi Voelker (born 1968), American alpine skier
- John D. Voelker (1903–1991), American writer

== See also ==
- Völker
