= Volkers =

Volkers is a surname. Notable people with the surname include:

- Wim Volkers (1899–1990), Dutch football player and coach

== See also ==
- Volker (name)
