= James William Mollison =

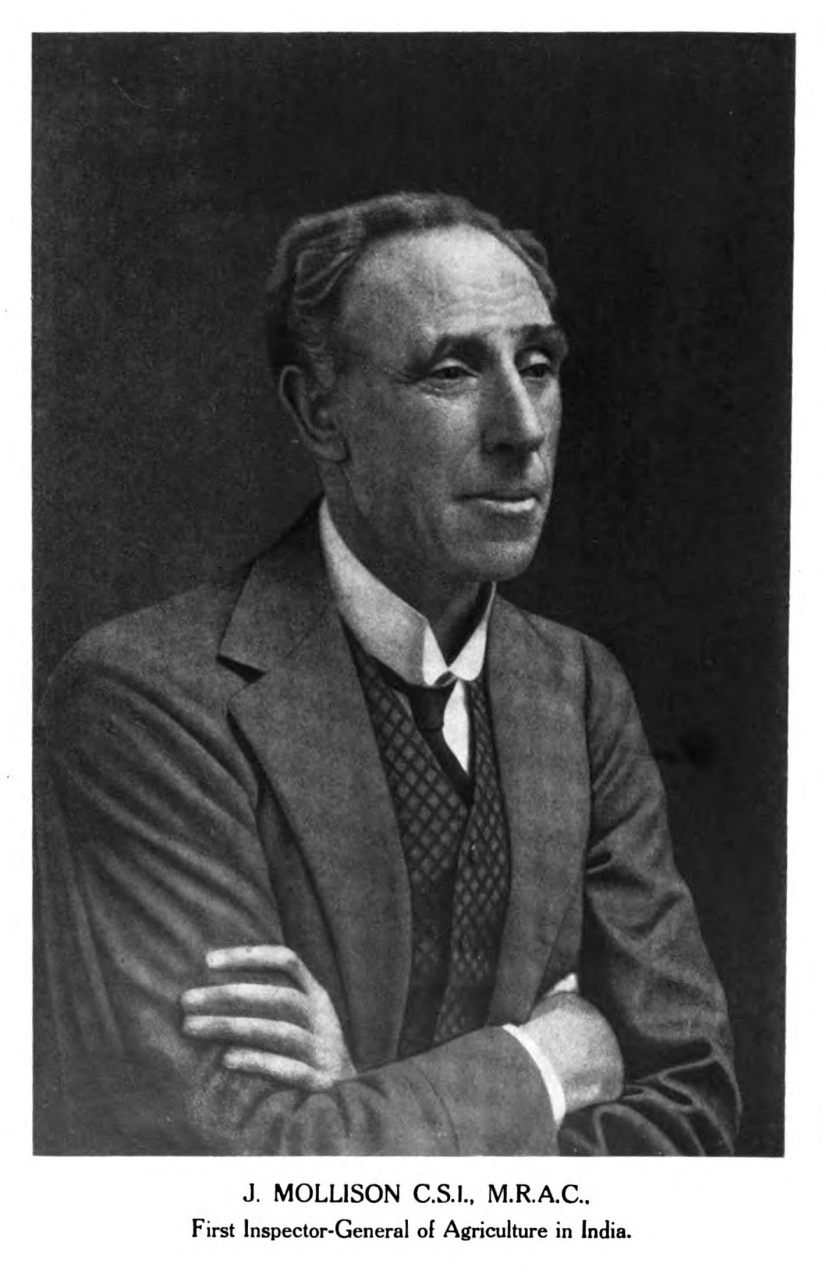

James William Mollison CSI (1858 – 1927) was a British specialist in agriculture who worked in the Bombay Presidency, where he served as director of agriculture before being appointed as the first inspector general of agriculture in India.

== Life and work ==
Mollison was born to James Mollison and Ann née Bisset in Inverness in 1858. With six other siblings, the family lived at Dochgarroch Lodge, Inverness between 1861 and 1871 and moved to Brunton House in Wiltshire around 1881.

Mollison moved to India, where he served as superintendent of the experimental farms in 1890 and was appointed technical director of agriculture for the Bombay Presidency in 1892. He published pamphlets on topics related to agriculture, writing on the cultivation of betel, cardamom and pepper in Kanara in 1900. In 1901 he was appointed inspector-general of agriculture, a position that was created after the visit of J.A. Voelcker. He published A text-book on Indian Agriculture in 1901 in three volumes. He also published notes on various agricultural issues in journals. He was invested as a Companion of the Order of the Star of India in 1911.

Mollison married Edith Mary, daughter of James McRae, a leather maker in Surrey, in 1901. They returned to England after his retirement and lived at Ascotts, Felbridge, Surrey. Mollison died in 1927.
