= John Walter Leather =

English agricultural chemist (1860–1934)

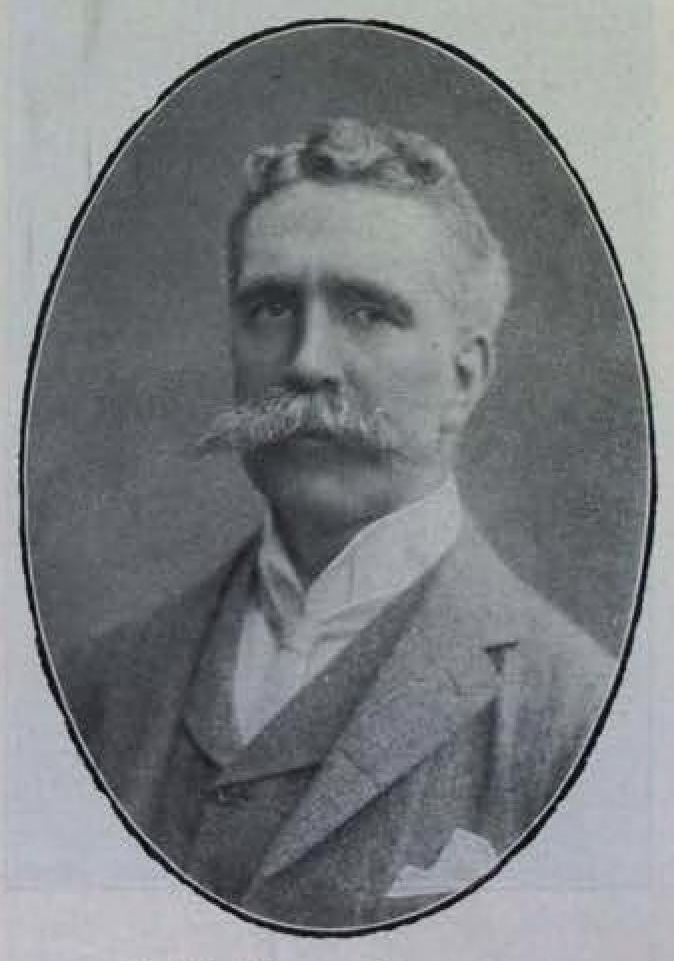
- Born: 26 December 1860; Rainhill, England
- Died: 14 November 1934 (aged 73)
- Occupation: Chemist

John Walter Leather (26 December 1860 – 14 November 1934) was an agricultural chemist who worked in India as the first Imperial Agricultural Chemist at the Imperial Agricultural Research Institute in Pusa, Bihar. Appointed in 1892, he worked on a variety of agricultural production and chemistry related issues in India.

== Biography ==
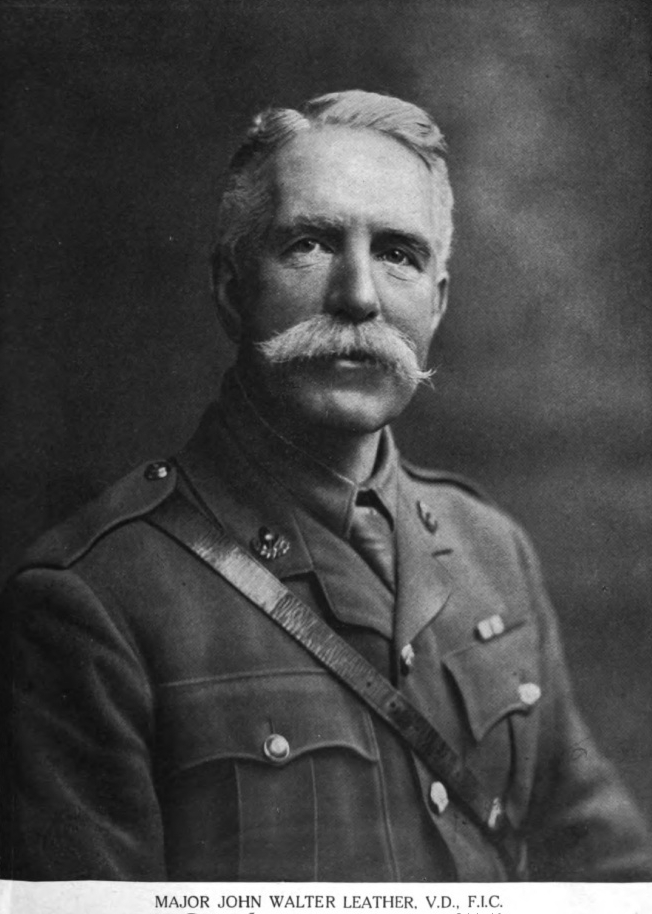
Leather c. 1917

Leather was born at Rainhill, Lancashire on 26 December 1860, the son of John Knowles Leather. After studying at Hayton College he joined his father's chemical factory at St. Helens. In 1883 he went to study chemistry at Bonn under August Kekule. He received a PhD in 1886 and became an assistant to J A Voelcker. His work included methods to detect castor seeds in animal feed. In 1891 he was appointed professor of chemistry at the Harris Institute, Preston but in the next year he was appointed chemist to the agricultural department in India at the recommendation of Voelcker. In 1906 he was designated as the Imperial agricultural chemist, a position he held until his retirement in 1916. His work included the analysis of Indian soils, foodstuffs and other matters of interest. He served as the head of the chemical department at the Imperial Agricultural Research Institute established in 1904 at Pusa in Bihar. The institute itself was established partly due to the indigo industry in India. The synthesis of indigo dye in Germany made it necessary to examine methods for a possible revival of the indigo industry in Bihar. Leather was sent on a tour to the indigo districts in 1899 and the location in Pusa was close to the main indigo plantations in northern Bihar. In 1915 he joined World War I. During his India service he was a part of the Dehra Dun Mounted Rifles and United Provinces Horse as a volunteer officer. In England he became a Major in the 3rd Garrison Battalion, Cheshire Regiment. He retired on 12 August 1916 from Indian service. After his retirement he lived in Malvern.

A daughter Alice Muriel married the Imperial Bacteriologist C.M. Hutchinson in 1914 while another, Wenonah Hardwick married (later Sir) Eric Cecil Ansorge in 1915. His youngest daughter Sheila Leather became a teacher, engineer, business woman and President of the Women's Engineering Society. and acted as his executor after his death.

== Publications ==
Leather published extensively in government reports. Some of Leather's key publications as books and in journals include the following:

- Leather, John Walter, and Jatindra Nath Mukerji (1914) The Indian saltpetre industry. No. 24. Superintendent Government Printing, 1911.
- Leather, John Walter, and A. C. Dobbs. The Yield and Composition of the Milk of the Montgomery Herd at Pusa and Errors in Milk Tests. Vol. 3. No. 6. Imperial Department of Agriculture in India.
- Leather, John Walter (1906) The composition of Indian rain and dew. Vol. 1. No. 1. Printed by Thacker, Spink & Co.
- Leather, J.W. (1907) Official and recommended methods for use in Chemical Laboratories of the Departments of Agriculture in India.
- Leather, J.W. (1915) Soil Gases
- Leather, John Walter (1915) The Effect of Climate on Soil Formation. Journal of Agricultural Science 7(2):135-136. doi:10.1017/S0021859600002562
