= Harold Hart Mann =

English scientist

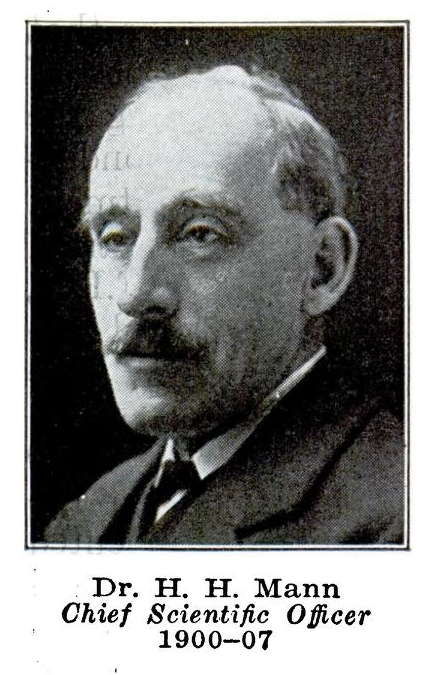
c. 1907

Harold Hart Mann (16 October 1872 – 2 December 1961) was an English chemist, bacteriologist, and agricultural scientist who worked in India serving as principal of the College of Agriculture, Poona. He was a specialist on tea cultivation but later became a pioneer of sociological research.

== Life and work ==
Mann was born in York, the son of W. E. Mann. After studying at Elmfield School, Victoria University, Manchester (BSc, 1892 with a Leblanc Medal) and Yorkshire College at Leeds, where he studied chemistry, he moved to the Pasteur Institute in Paris where he trained under Émile Duclaux. He also took an interest in bacteriology, examining antiseptic activity on yeasts. He then worked in England working on organic chemistry under Harry Ingle. He worked as a chemist with the Royal Agricultural Society from 1895 to 1900 as an assistant to J.A. Voelcker before moving to India. He received a MSc in 1898. Mann joined as Chief Scientific Officer of Indian Tea Association in 1900 and extensively traveled in Assam and North East India for scientific research on early tea plantations. He was instrumental in setting up the world's first tea research institute at Tocklai, Jorhat, Assam (India) known as the Tocklai Experimental Station and later renamed as the Tocklai Tea Research Institute. In 1905 he received a DSc from the University of Leeds for his work on enzymes in tea fermentation. Mann contributed to the studies on tea pests and disease, soils, manuring, and agricultural practices. He also wrote ethnological studies, including one on the medicinal and dietary use of soils in India. He resigned from Indian Tea Association in June 1907 and joined as principal of the Agricultural College at Poona while also serving as chemist to the Government of Bombay. He worked on the second edition of a work on the pests and diseases of tea in collaboration with Sir George Watt and served as editor for the second and third editions of the Handbook of Indian Agriculture. He served as a director of agriculture for Bombay Presidency from 1921. He was also an advisor to the Indian Tea Association at Calcutta. He retired at the age of 55 and at the request of Sir John Russell he took charge of the Woburn Experimental farm (run by the Lawes Agricultural Trust) from 1928 to 1956. He also advised many governments including the Soviet government on tea cultivation from 1930 to 1933, Tanganyika in 1932, Iran in 1935 and Turkey in 1940.

Mann married Katherine, daughter of the Reverend J. H. Collie of Claughton, Birkenhead, in 1913. He died at his home in Aspley Guise.

Mann was the author of many books on agriculture and sociology including Land and Labour in a Deccan Village (1903), Statistical Atlas of the Bombay Presidency (1925). He was awarded a Kaiser-i-Hind medal in 1917.
