= Augustus Voelcker =

Anglo-German chemist (1822–1884)

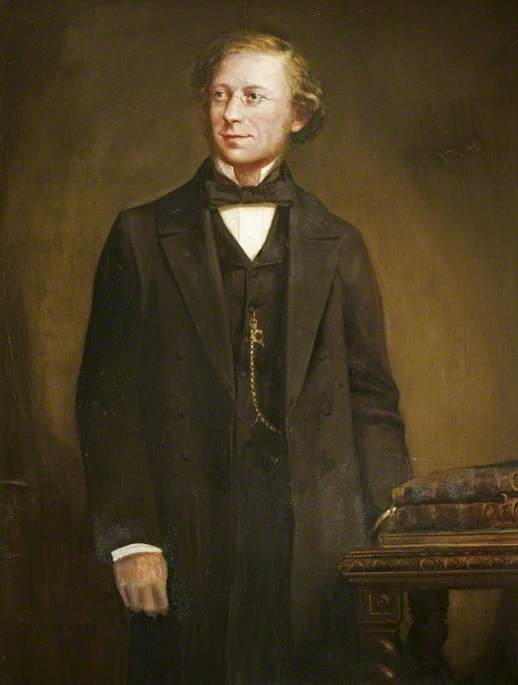
- Portrait c. 1862 from collection of Royal Agricultural University
- Born: 24 September 1822; Frankfurt am Main
- Died: 5 December 1884 (aged 62); London, England
- Known for: Royal Agricultural Society of England
- Scientific career
- Fields: Chemist

John Christopher Augustus Voelcker FRS (24 September 1822 – 5 December 1884) was a Royal Agricultural Society of England chemist. Voelcker was known for his methodical and precise analytical practices as applied to agricultural chemistry. He began a series of long-term experiments at Woburn on crop rotation and fertilization in 1876. This was continued after his death in 1884 by his son John Augustus Voelcker (1854-1937) who was also an agricultural chemist who headed a committee to investigate improvements to agriculture in India following famines there.

== Life ==
Born in Frankfurt, Augustus was the fifth son of Frederick Adolphus Voelcker, a local merchant who died when he was eleven. Poor health led to delayed schooling and he was forced to seek employment at the age of sixteen. After working as a pharmacist's assistant in Frankfurt am Main until 1842 and in Schaffhausen until 1844, Voelcker entered University of Göttingen where he studied chemistry under professor Friedrich Wöhler. He also attended University of Giessen, where the German chemist Justus von Liebig lectured on agricultural chemistry. He received a doctor of philosophy degree from Göttingen University where his dissertation was on the composition of tortoise-shell. He went to Utrecht in 1846 to work as assistant to professor Gerardus Johannes Mulder where Voelcker studied the chemistry of animal and vegetable production. In 1847 he went to Edinburgh as assistant to James Finlay Weir Johnston, the Highland and Agricultural Society of Scotland's chemist at the time. Whilst in Edinburgh, he lectured at Durham University and also became friends with the chemist George Wilson. From 1849, as the first professor of chemistry at the Royal Agricultural College, Cirencester, Voelcker lectured on such topics as sewage.

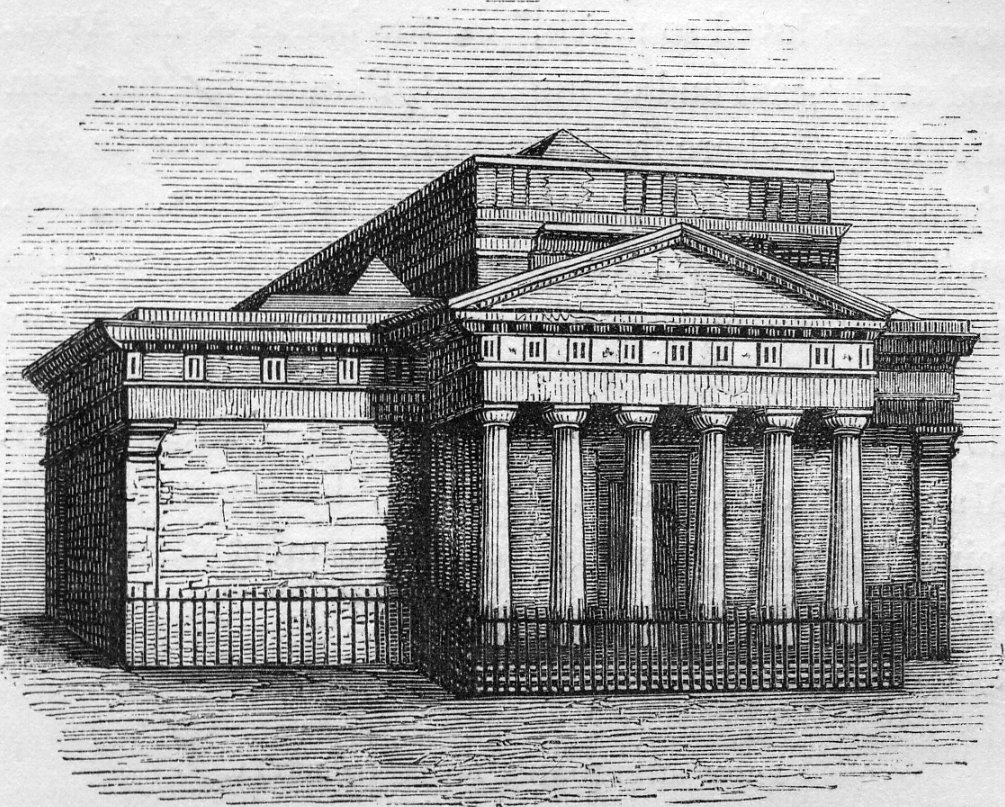
Voelcker was consultant chemist for the Bath Royal Literary and Scientific Institution (1849–1863)

Voelcker was recruited as consultant chemist to the Royal Bath and West of England Society by Sir Thomas Dyke Acland, 11th Baronet in about 1849. He was appointed consultant chemist to the Bath Royal Literary and Scientific Institution in 1855, a post he held until 1863, although he continued to maintain connections with the society. After his death in 1884, his son, also John Augustus Voelcker was appointed the consultant chemist (until 1936) and he in turn was followed by Eric Voelcker, son of the third son "Will" (until 1976). John Augustus Voelcker jr. conducted long-term experiments on crop rotation and fertilizer application at Woburn. Voelcker (senior) contributed to the society's journal and lectured throughout the area. He was well aware of agricultural economics, for, as he said

any good analytical chemist can ascertain the exact amount of the different constituents of the manure, and, knowing the market price at which they can be. Retrieved separately, he is enabled to calculate with tolerable accuracy its commercial value

He set up a private consulting practice in London in 1863; he provided advice in many fields including sewage, water and gas supply, river pollution, and agricultural holdings. For example, by using the cost of ammonia as nine pence per pound, and the cost of phosphates as two pence per pound, an 1885 book reported Voelcker as calculating the annual value of excrement per adult as nine shillings (worth 50 pound sterling in 2025). He was elected chairman of the London Farmers Club in 1875. Following a major famine in India, his son J.A. Voelcker was sent in 1889 as the head of a committee that examined and suggested improvements to agriculture there.

Voelcker married Susanna Wilhelm in 1852 and they had four sons and a daughter. The first son George died of diphtheria while studying medicine. The second and third sons John Augustus Voelcker and Edward William Voelcker (1857–1930) ("Will" whose son Eric Voelcker was also a chemist) followed in their father's footsteps to become agricultural chemists of repute. The fourth son was Arthur Francis Voelcker, MD, FRCP (1861–1946). Voelcker was interested in religion and took an active role in the activities of the British and Foreign Bible Society. He died of a heart ailment at his home in Kensington, London.

== Selected bibliography ==
Voelcker published numerous papers including several in German and Dutch scientific journals (1844–1846). A sample of publications include:

- Voelcker, A (April 1850). "Analysis of the Anthracite of the Calton Hill, Edinburgh". Edinburgh New Philosophical Journal. Read before the Royal Society of Edinburgh, 4 March 1850
- Voelcker, Augustus (March 1850). "On the Watery Secretion of the Leaves and Stems of the Ice-plant (Mesembryanthemum crystallinum, L.)". Annals and Magazine of Natural History. Read before the Botanical Society of Edinburgh, 10 January 1850
- Voelcker (March 1851). "The Effects of Burnt Clay as a Manure". Journal of Agriculture, and Transactions of the Highland and Agricultural Society of Scotland.
- Voelcker, Augustus (January 1853). "On the comparative value of white Scottish and black English oats; and on the composition of rice-meal". Journal of Agriculture, and Transactions of the Highland and Agricultural Society of Scotland.
- Voelcker, Augustus (July 1854). "On the composition of green rye and rape". Transactions of the Highland and Agricultural Society of Scotland.
- Voelcker, Augustus (January 1854). "On the composition of the parsnip and white Belgian carrot". Journal of the Royal Agricultural Society of England. XIII (2).
- Voelcker, Augustus (1855). "On the comparative value of different artificial manures for raising a crop of swedes". Journal of the Royal Agricultural Society of England. XVI (1).
- Voelcker, Augustus (1855). "On the agricultural and commercial value of some artificial manures, and on their adulteration". The Bath and West of England Agricultural Journal. III.
- Voelcker, Augustus (1856). "On the chemistry of food". The Bath and West of England Agricultural Journal. IV.
- Voelcker, Augustus (1856). "Four lectures: On the composition of farmyard manure, and the changes which it undergoes on keeping under different circumstances". Journal of the Royal Agricultural Society of England. XVII (1).
- Voelcker, Augustus (1857). "Four lectures: Farmyard manure, Artificial manures, Barren and fertile soils, Oil-cakes". Agricultural Chemistry.
- Voelcker, Augustus (1857). "On Farmyard manure, the drainings of dung-heaps, and the absorbing properties of soils". Journal of the Royal Agricultural Society of England. XVIII (1).
- Voelcker, Augustus (1858). "On the use of lime, marl, and shell-sand in agriculture". The Bath and West of England Agricultural Journal. VI.
