= J. A. Voelcker =

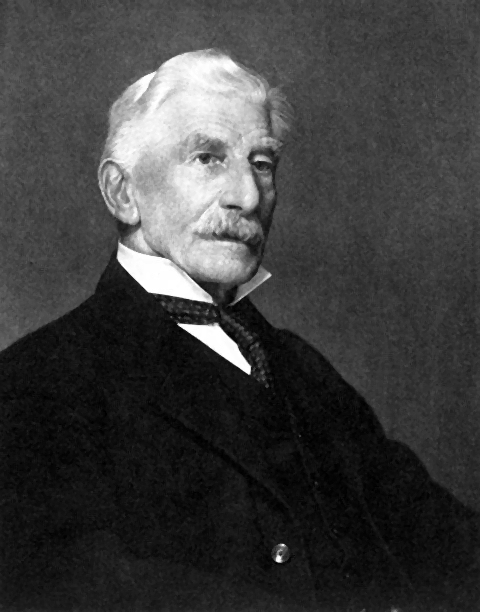
Portrait c. 1915

John Augustus Voelcker CIE (24 June 1854 – 6 November 1937) was an English agricultural chemist and the second son of the German-born English chemist Augustus Voelcker (1822–1884). John Augustus (Jr.) succeeded his father as consulting chemist to the Royal Agricultural Society of England and continued research on soil fertility. He headed a committee that examined issues in Indian agriculture in 1891.

== Early life and career ==
John was the second of five sons of Augustus Voelcker and born at Cirencester. After school he studied chemistry under Temple Orme before joining University College where his chemistry teacher was Professor Alexander William Williamson. He was also a long-distance runner and a member of the London Athletic Club. He won two medals at the 1881 AAA Championships.

Voelcker then, like his father, studied chemistry in Giessen and received a doctorate for work on the composition of apatite and natural forms of calcium phosphate. He then returned to England to work with his father's laboratory. After the death of his father in 1884, he continued the experiments at the Woburn Experimental Station. One of the key findings at Woburn was the finding that sulphate of ammonia use in acidic soils led to the loss of soil nutrients by the leaching of calcium sulphate from the soil.

== Indian agriculture ==
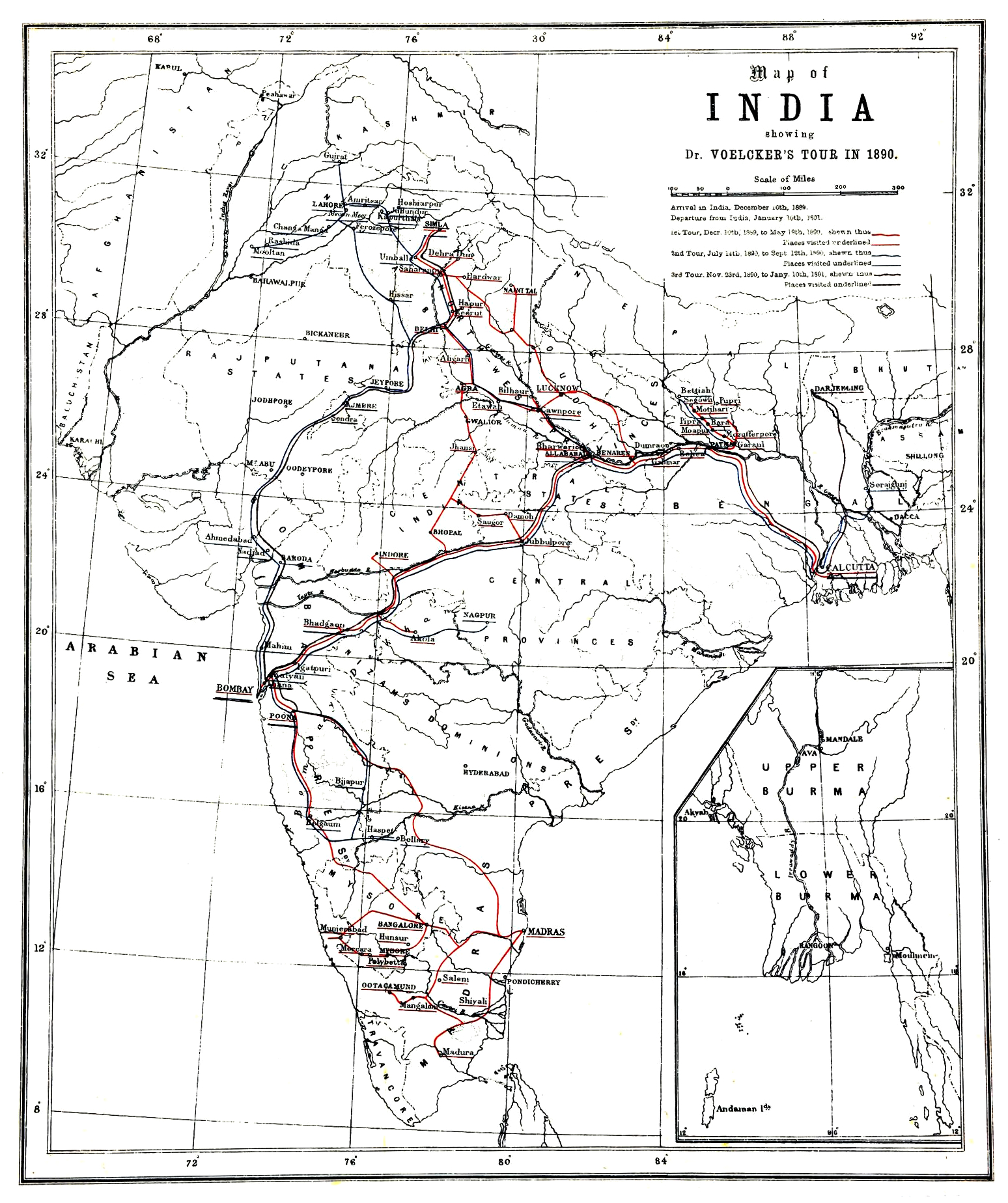
Voelcker's tour of India, 1890-91

In 1889, Voelcker was requested, on the recommendation of Sir James Caird, by the Secretary of State for India to examine improvements in Indian agriculture. He then spent a full year travelling around India and producing a 450-page report of recommendations. Voelcker's travels and enquiries led to his noting that Indian agriculture was highly varied across the country, defying generalization, and that some of the farming practices were as good as they could be. He called for a systematic study for the improvement of farming systems. The department of agriculture had been dissolved but Voelcker met a key person associated with it in the past, Allan Octavian Hume. Hume had been highly critical of British policy in India. Voelcker also met Robert H. Elliot who was against artificial fertilisers. With regard to soil fertility, he noted that in areas where fuel was in short supply, that cattle manure was used for burning and not returned to the soil. He suggested that this could be ameliorated through the establishment of fuelwood plantations. It has been suggested that Voelcker's report was in many places a social critique, partly of imperialism. Following Voelcker's suggestion and in the face of impending famines, English chemist J. Walter Leather was appointed agricultural chemist. George Curzon, 1st Marquess Curzon of Kedleston read the report and took various measures to re-establish a department of agriculture to coordinate policy across the country. Curzon appointed James William Mollison from Bombay as the first Inspector General of Agriculture in 1901. For his contributions to Indian agriculture, Voelcker was appointed a Companion of the Order of the Indian Empire (CIE) in the 1928 Birthday Honours.

A mineral was named after him as Voelckerite but it was subsequently identified as being a form of fluorapatite.

== Personal life ==
Voelcker was a devout Christian who attended St. John's Presbyterian Church at Kensington. He married Alice Westgarth in 1884 and they had three sons and three daughters.
