= Dartford Science & Technology College =

Location
- Heath Lane; Dartford, Kent, DA1 2LY; England; 51.44181°N 0.20344°E

Information
- Type: Foundation school
- Local authority: Kent County Council
- Department for Education URN: 118785 Tables
- Ofsted: Reports
- Age: 11 to 18
- Enrolment: 733 as of April 2016
- Website: http://www.dstc.kent.sch.uk/

Dartford Science & Technology College (DSTC) is a non-selective school for girls in Dartford, Kent, England. DSTC has moved to a campus it shares with a nursery, primary school, and adult education. It has two specialisms: Science and Technology.

DSTC is a foundation school administered by Dartford Community Learning Partnership. The partnership includes Abbott Laboratories, the Co-operative movement, Darent Valley Hospital Trust, Kent County Council, STEMNET and the University of Greenwich.
