= Volker Mosblech =

German politician (1955–2024)

Volker Mosblech (10 January 1955 – 26 April 2024) was a German politician from the Christian Democratic Union. From 2015 to 2017 he was a member of the German Bundestag.

== Education and career ==
After graduating from high school in 1976, Volker Mosblech began studying economics at the University of Duisburg and law at the University of Bonn. He was a working student at the Lower Rhine Gas and Water Works in Duisburg from 1976 to 1982 and from 1983 to 1986. He was employed as an editor at Sinusverlag in Krefeld from 1986 to 1987 and continued to work there as a freelancer from 1988 to 1992. Mosblech worked as the main representative of Victoria Versicherungen AG from 1989 to 2000, and as of 2001 he was the main representative of DAS Versicherungen AG.

== Political career ==
Volker Mosblech became a member of the CDU in 1972. He was chairman of the Young Union local association Duisburg-Hamborn from 1976 to 1979 and chairman of the JU district association in Duisburg from 1987 to 1989. From 1978 to 1987 he was deputy chairman of the JU district Rhenish Ruhr area. He was deputy chairman of the Duisburg CDU district association from 1993 and chairman of the Duisburg-Alt-Hamborn CDU local association from 1997. In 1989 he became chairman of the East and Central German Association (OMV) of the CDU district association in Duisburg. From 1991 to 2002 and from 2004, Mosblech served as deputy chairman of the OMV regional association in North Rhine-Westphalia. From 1989 to 1994 he was a member of the Duisburg-Hamborn district council. He was a member of the Duisburg City Council from 1994 onwards, at the time of his death in the role of Second Mayor.

Volker Mosblech was a member of the 13th Landtag of North Rhine-Westphalia, which he joined on 6 September 2004 and of which he was a member until 2 June 2005. After the death of Philipp Mißfelder, he joined the Bundestag on 20 July 2015. In the 2017 German federal election he lost re-election to the Bundestag.

Mosblech died on 26 April 2024, at the age of 69.

== See also ==
- List of members of the 18th Bundestag
