= Cobham Technical Services =

Technology firm in UK

Cobham Technical Services (the trading name of Cobham CTS Ltd) is a UK-based technology organisation founded in 1920. It sells products for terrestrial and satellite communications, navigation and sensor applications; technical services and specialised systems for high-voltage and lightning testing; electromagnetic and multiphysics simulation software products.

== History ==
The history of Cobham Technical Services dates back to 1920 with the incorporation of the British Electrical and Allied Industries Research Association, which became generally known as the Electrical Research Association, or ERA. Initially, ERA’s funding came jointly from government, through the Department of Scientific and Industrial Research, from industry, and from the subscriptions of member companies.

During the 1939-1945 war, direct assistance to the war effort was given by ERA, having been recognised by the Ministry of Labour in 1941 as an "essential undertaking". Activities during the war included working on the development of radar and mine detection equipment.

Major new laboratories and offices were opened in Leatherhead, Surrey in 1957 which have remained the principal location of the organisation ever since. Development on the 15-acre campus site has continued to the present day with the addition of several large purpose-built facilities.

In September 1979 ERA formally changed its name from The Electrical Research Association Ltd to ERA Technology Ltd. During the 1970s, 1980s and 1990s ERA expanded into new research areas, including RF technology and electronic systems.

In January 2001, the entire organisation was transferred to a new trading company, limited by shares. The original company, still limited by guarantee, was renamed The ERA Foundation. The trading operation, retaining the name ERA Technology, was run as a wholly commercial enterprise, responsible to its shareholders.

In September 2003, the company announced the agreement to sell the entire issued share capital of ERA Technology to Cobham plc.

In March 2009, ERA Technology, Culham Lightning and Vector Fields assumed the collective trading name Cobham Technical Services as part of a Group wide rebranding programme by FTSE 100 parent company Cobham plc.

In March 2011, Cobham plc completed the divestment of the engineering consultancy group of Cobham Technical Services to edif Group, which took the legal entity name “ERA Technology Ltd”.
