= La Sainte Union =

La Sainte Union may refer to:

- La Sainte Union Catholic School, a girls' school in north London.
- La Sainte Union College of Higher Education, a former teacher training college in Southampton.
- Sisters of La Sainte-Union des Sacrés-Coeurs, a congregation of religious sisters with many schools and colleges around the world.
