= La Sainte Union Catholic School =

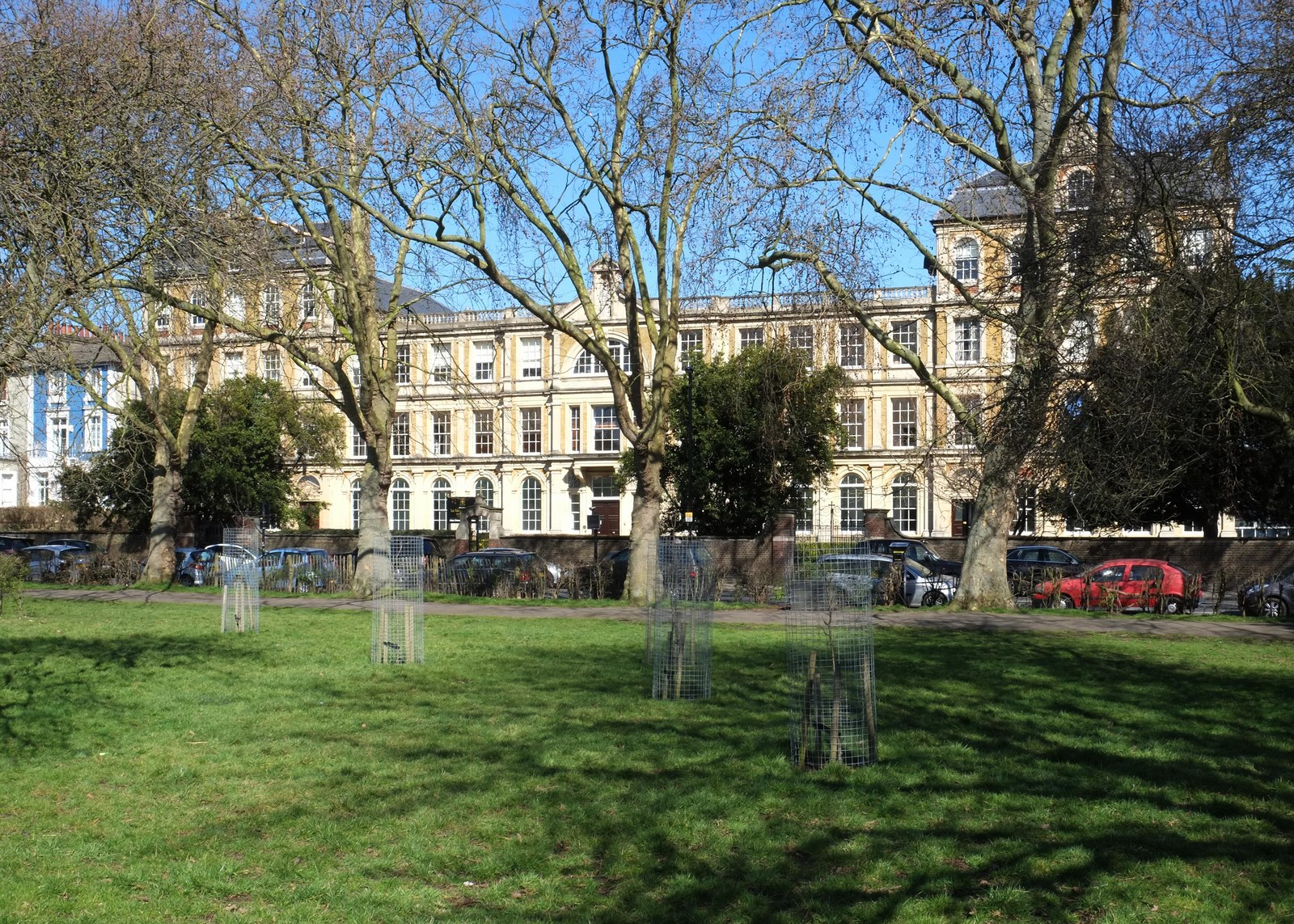

Location
- Highgate Road; London, NW5 1RP; England; 51.56°N 0.14942°W

Information
- Type: Voluntary aided school
- Motto: Cuique Omnes et Omnes Deo – Each for all and all for God
- Religious affiliation: Roman Catholic
- Established: 1861
- Founder: Jean Baptiste Debrabant
- Local authority: Camden
- Department for Education URN: 100059 Tables
- Ofsted: Reports
- Head teacher: Sophie Fegan
- Gender: Girls (mixed at 6th Form)
- Age: 11 to 18
- Colours: Bottle Green, White & Gold
- Website: www.lasainteunion.org.uk

La Sainte Union Catholic School is a girls Roman Catholic secondary school based in Highgate in north London.

== History ==
Formerly, a grant-maintained school, La Sainte Union Catholic School is now a voluntary-aided school which teaches girls aged 11–16 and both girls and boys at sixth form as part of the LaSWAP Sixth Form Consortium. LaSWAP is made up of LSU and 3 other partner schools: William Ellis School, Acland Burghley School and Parliament Hill School.

The school is named after the order of sisters that founded the school, the Sisters of La Sainte Union des Sacrés-Coeurs (also known as the Holy Union Sisters). This teaching order was founded in 1826 by Father Jean-Baptiste Debrabant, a Belgian priest who felt that the future of the Catholic Church lay in the hands of the young women who would eventually bring up future generations of the faithful, declaring that "a Christian-based education offers sure hope for the future of religion and society".

The school site is on Highgate Road/Croftdown Road, opposite Parliament Hill Fields. It was originally a small private boarding school, becoming a comprehensive school in 1966, following its amalgamation with Our Lady of Sion Girls' Grammar School which closed its school in Eden Grove, Holloway and moved to the Highgate site. During the 1990s the school had grant-maintained status. It was one of the first schools in London to be named as a Beacon school in a government scheme designed to recognize outstanding achievement in inner-city schools. The school in 2004 was awarded specialist school (science) status, and High Performing Specialist School status in 2008. The school is also recognised as an International School by the British Council and has an award-winning careers education programme.

The school was recognised as a good school by Ofsted in 2010, and confirmed as such in a Section 8 inspection in 2019.

== LaSWAP Sixth Form ==
The LaSWAP Sixth Form is the sixth form consortium of four north London schools: Acland Burghley School, La Sainte Union Catholic School, Parliament Hill School and William Ellis School. It is one of the largest sixth form consortia in the Greater London area offering some 42 different AS and A2 courses, AGCEs, BTECs, NVQs and GCSE courses. The name was formed from the first three letters of La Sainte Union and the first letter of the other three schools.

== Media ==
La Sainte Union has been featured in The Westminster Extra, The Camden New Journal and The Ham&High multiple times for their school plays and acting opportunities.

== Notable former pupils ==
- Kathleen Mary Cook (1910-1971) - mechanical engineer
- Imelda Staunton (b. 1956) - actress, 'Vera Drake', and 'Harry Potter and The Order of The Phoenix
- Maggie Aderin-Pocock (b. 1968) - British space scientist
- Tulisa Contostavlos (b. 1988) - musician, N-Dubz, attended the school during her early secondary years

== Sister schools ==
- St Catherine's Catholic School for Girls England
- St. Anne's Catholic School (Southampton) England
- Grays Convent High School England
- La Sainte Union Convent School England
- La Sainte Union College of Higher Education England
- Banagher College Ireland
- Our Lady's Bower School Ireland
- Debrabant School Tanzania
