= Margaret Collins =

Margaret Collins may refer to:

- Margaret Collins-O'Driscoll (1876–1945), Irish politician
- Margaret Collins Schweinhaut (1903–1997), American politician
- Margaret S. Collins (1922–1996), African-American child prodigy and entomologist
- Margaret Collins (nurse) (1927–2023), British nurse and Royal Navy officer

== See also ==
- Margaret Collinson, British paleobotanist
- Susan Margaret Collins (born 1952), American politician
