= The Dell, Thurrock =

Concrete house in Grays, England

The Dell
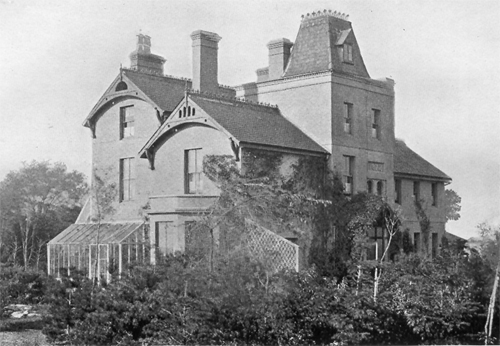
- The Dell as it was in Wallace's time (from My Life, 1905)
- Interactive map of the The Dell area

General information
- Type: House
- Location: 25 College Avenue, Grays
- Coordinates: 51°29′N 0°20′E
- Completed: 1872; 154 years ago
- Owner: The Navbridge Group

Technical details
- Structural system: Concrete

Design and construction
- Architect: Thomas Robjohns Wonnacott

The Dell is a house in Grays, Thurrock, Essex, built in concrete—one of the earliest houses in Britain to be built in this material. It was built on the instructions of Alfred Russel Wallace, who lived in Grays from 1872 until 1876.

== Construction ==
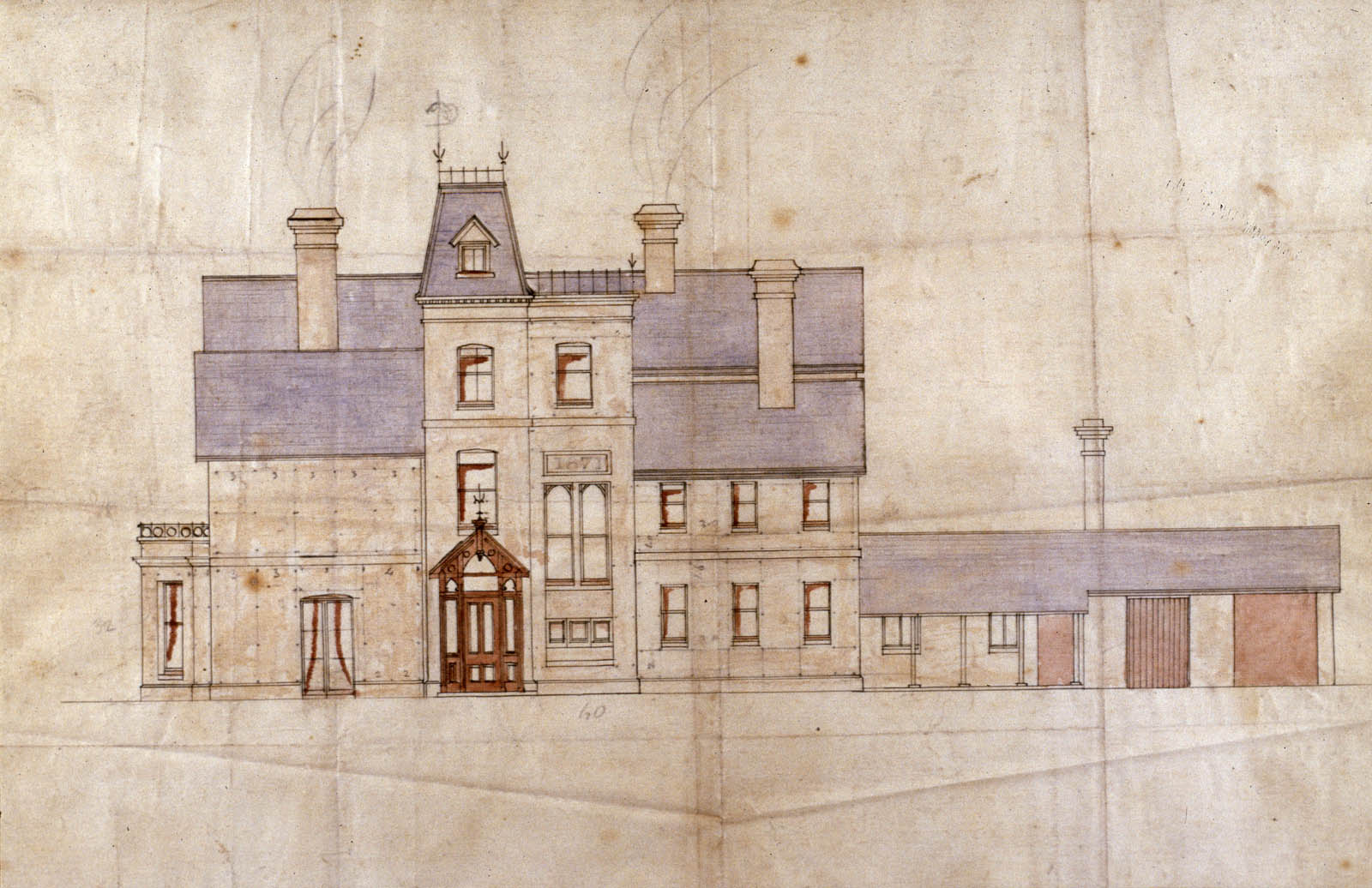
Architectural drawing of The Dell by Thomas Robjohns Wonnacott, RIBA, for Alfred Russel Wallace, 1870.

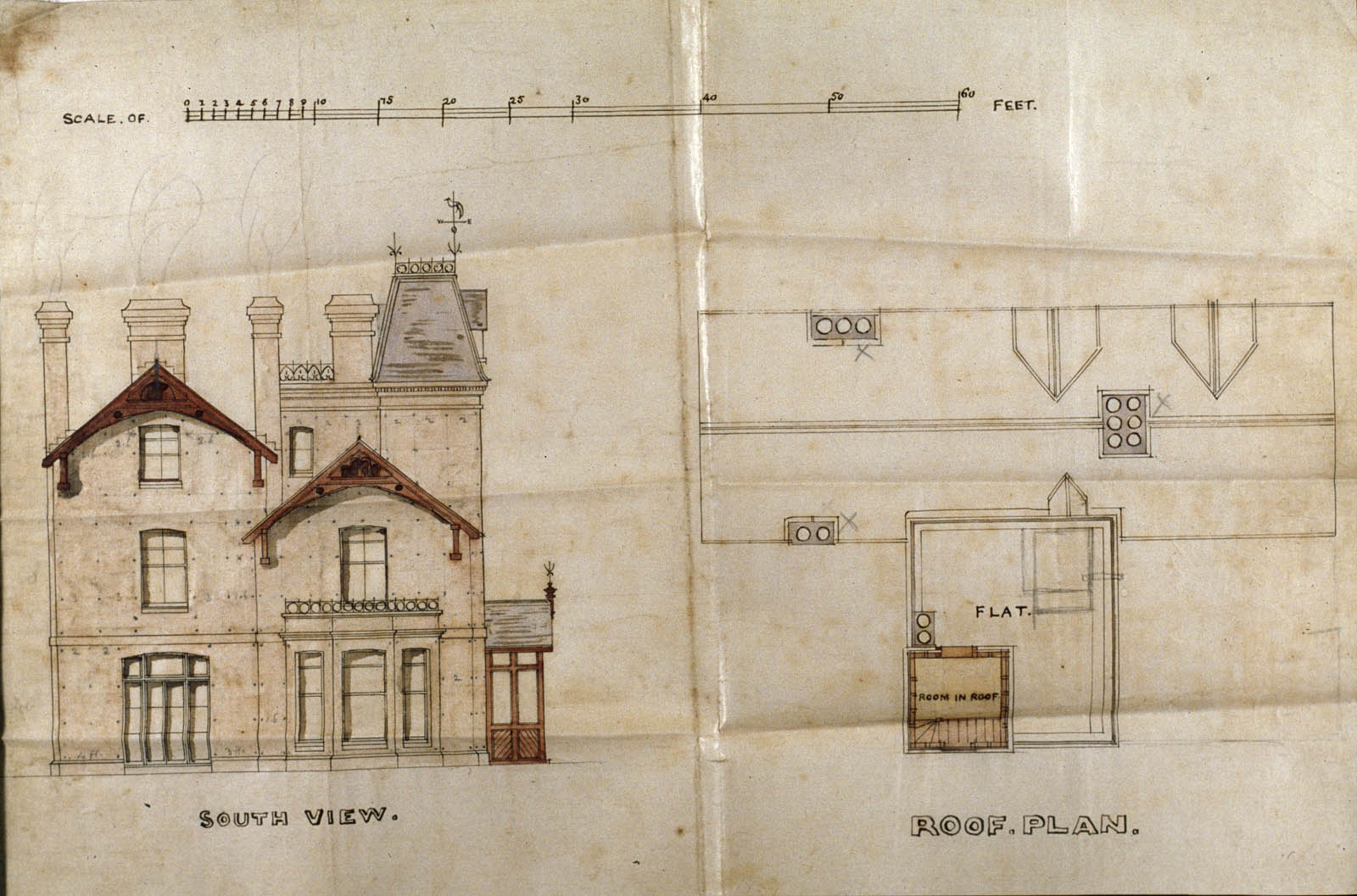
Architectural drawing of The Dell by Thomas Robjohns Wonnacott, RIBA, for Alfred Russel Wallace, 1870.

Wallace was living in Barking in 1871, but did not like the area. He leased 4 acres (16,000 m^{2}) of land in Grays that included an old chalk pit. He decided to build a house on this land to his own specification. There was a nearby cement works and a supply of gravel on the site, so he chose to build the house in concrete. He employed Thomas Robjohns Wonnacott of Farnham as his architect because he had experience in this new material. The grounds were laid out by Wallace himself. They included a serpentine drive from the road now known as Dell Road, (College Avenue did not exist when the house was built). He described the grounds as "a bit of a wilderness that can be made into a splendid imitation of a Welsh valley". Wallace earned the money to pay for the Dell from the natural history collections he made while in south-east Asia.

== The house ==
There is a plan of the ground floor of the Dell in the Natural History Museum. This was drawn and annotated by Wallace himself. It may be a draft of the final plans, which were prepared by Wonnacott. The Natural History Museum also has a front view of the house in black ink on waxed linen, coloured with blue and brown inks. This too was possibly drawn by Wallace, although it is unsigned. It shows a grand entrance porch to a house with three levels and a fourth-level attic room. There are three chimneys on the main house and a one-storey wing extending to the right. The house overlooked the Thames and on the ground floor there was a large dining room, a library or drawing room, a breakfast room, a veranda, and a kitchen. It was connected to the local gas supply and collected rainwater, although this supplied only the sink and lavatory.

== Life at the Dell ==
Wallace expected to settle in Grays and live in his new home for the rest of his life. Over the next four years he wrote and published a number of articles and scientific papers, particularly the two volumes of The Geographical Distribution of Animals. In 1873 he started to keep a notebook, including gardening notes from the Dell entitled '1873 Calendar of flowering plants at the Dell'. These are now part of the Wallace collection at the Natural History Museum.

While living at the Dell, Wallace continued to correspond with Darwin. He also took an interest in topics such as social reform and spiritualism, which latter, particularly, was to lead him into difficulties with the mainstream of the scientific establishment. Unfortunately, Wallace’s young son died and the family stayed in the Dell for only four and a half years. He lived in several places after Grays.

== The Dell after Wallace ==
The Dell in 2018 after conversion to flats.

Wallace left the Dell in 1876 and the house was sold. The sale particulars describe it as having views that "would well repay a visit". At that time the "unusually attractive" grounds included a fountain and a croquet lawn as well as winding walks and terrace. The house was bought by William Winch Hughes, founder of the Victoria Wine Company.

The Dell survives as number 25 College Avenue and is now a Grade II listed building with the date of construction prominently displayed. It was used as a convent by the Sisters of La Sainte-Union des Sacrés-Coeurs order of nuns who had founded the nearby Grays Convent High School. Some rooms in the Dell were used by the school's sixth form.

On Saturday 14 September 2002, a green Thurrock Heritage plaque on the building was unveiled by Wallace's grandson Richard to commemorate Wallace's role in developing the theory of natural selection.

In April 2013, the house was offered for sale at £1.5m and in 2015 the price was lowered to £700,000. The property was bought by the Navbridge Group and was converted into three flats.
