= Angela Wrapson =

Arts consultant

- Born: 23 February 1946; Southampton, England
- Died: 4 June 2019 (aged 73); Edinburgh, Scotland

Angela Mary Wrapson (23 February 1946 – 4 June 2019) was an arts consultant, former director of the Hansard Society Scotland, and the first female Chair of the Traverse Theatre in Edinburgh.

== Early life and education ==
Wrapson was born in Southampton in 1946, the only child of Frederick George Wrapson (1916–1985), an electrical engineer, and his wife Gwendolyne Winifred Hesta, née Welch (1916–1981), a hairdresser. Her parents were determined that she would have the best education possible, and sent her to St Anne's Catholic School for Girls because of its academic reputation.

As a teenager, she worked on archaeological excavations in Winchester, which gave her an interest in the Anglo-Saxons. She went on to study English at University College London, sharing a flat in Notting Hill with theatre workers, including playwright Howard Brenton and director Chris Parr.

After graduating in 1968, she hitch-hiked solo through Europe to Yugoslavia, before taking front-of-house jobs in theatres in Frinton-on-Sea, Chester, and then London. There, in 1971, she participated in the first Women’s Liberation march. After a year travelling in France and Pakistan, in 1973 Wrapson moved to Edinburgh to undertake teacher training at Moray House College of Education.

== Career ==
In the 1970s and 80s, Wrapson taught English at various schools in Edinburgh including eleven years at Holy Rood High School.

In 1979 Wrapson joined the board of the Traverse Theatre, whose artistic director, her old friend, Parr, was transforming the theatre into a leading new-writing company. In 1983, she became Chair of the Traverse Theatre Committee at a difficult moment in the theatre’s transition from private club to public theatre, steering the organisation deftly through what could have been a terminal crisis. She resigned in 1989.

In the late 1980s and 1990s, she worked as a curator, administrator and project leader for a huge range of Edinburgh-based arts and cultural organisations, including the Demarco and 369 Galleries, the Scottish Sculpture Trust, the Edinburgh International Festival and the Fruitmarket Gallery.

In 2013 Wrapson organised one of her last artistic projects, typically atypical in its innovation and individuality. The Prestwick World Festival of Flight included film, music, and visual arts, and she ‘persuaded BAE Systems and other sponsors to fund a commemoration of the first flight over Everest, which had been undertaken 80 years earlier by two Scots, David Fowler McIntyre and Douglas Douglas-Hamilton, the Marquis of Clydesdale’.

== Personal life and interests ==
When Wrapson moved to Edinburgh, she made new friendships and contacts. By 1974 she was involved with the Edinburgh-based cultural group The Heretics, and volunteered as press officer for that year’s highly successful teachers’ strike. On the strike committee she met George Kerevan, who would become an influential Edinburgh Labour councillor, Scotsman journalist, and, later, a Scottish National Party (SNP) MP. By 1976 they had established a partnership that would be lifelong.

Wrapson and Kerevan first lived together in Gorgie, then Portobello. In 1988, they bought the east wing of Brunstane House, a beautiful 17th century “Scottish chateau” on the east side of Edinburgh. The restoration of the house and garden, and the honouring of its fascinating history, became part of their life’s work; and they were married there in 1991.

She supported Kerevan throughout the 2011 Scottish parliament election campaign, the 2014 Scottish independence referendum campaign, and the 2015 and 2017 UK general election campaigns. On his election as SNP MP for East Lothian in 2015, she organised his Haddington constituency office and served as his full- time parliamentary assistant during his two years as an MP.

== Death and legacy ==
Wrapson was diagnosed with cancer in 2010. She died in Edinburgh on 4 June 2019.

She is survived by her husband George, her sister-in-law Alice and brother-in-law Robin and their family.
