= Daniele Dini =

Italian/British Mechanical Engineer

Daniele Dini is an Italian/British Mechanical Engineer. He is a Professor of Tribology at Imperial College London, where he is Head of the Tribology Group. Tribology is the science and engineering of friction, lubrication and wear.

== Education ==
Dini received an M.Eng. degree in Mechanical Engineering from the Politecnico di Bari, Italy in 2000, He then studied for a D.Phil. in the Department of Engineering Science at the University of Oxford, which he obtained in 2004. His D.Phil. research was performed under the supervision of Professor David Hills.

== Research and career ==
Dini is currently the Shell-Royal Academy of Engineering Chair in Complex Engineering Interfaces. Previously, he was an Engineering and Physical Sciences Research Council Established Career Fellow. Dini has published over 250 peer-reviewed papers in the field of tribology. According to Google Scholar, his research has been cited over 6000 times and he has a h-index of 43. He is an expert in the modelling and simulation of tribological systems across scales. Dini was promoted to full Professor in 2017, his inaugural lecture was entitled 'Releasing friction's potential'. In the same year, he succeeded Professor Hugh Spikes as Head of the Tribology Group.

He is an Assistant Editor for the Elsevier journal International Journal of Solids and Structures and is on the International Advisory Editorial Board for Tribology International. He is a Co-Director of both the Shell University Technology Centre (UTC) for Mobility and Lubricants and the SKF UTC, which are based in the Department of Mechanical Engineering at Imperial College London. He is also currently Director of Research for the Department of Mechanical Engineering at Imperial College London.

== Honours and awards ==
Dini is the recipient of a number of awards, including: the Tribology Bronze Medal (IMechE, 2004); the Jacob Wallenberg Foundation Award (Royal Swedish Academy of Engineering Sciences, 2007); three best paper awards: Thomas Bernard Hall Prize (IMechE, 2008 and 2010) and the Kenneth L. Johnson Award (ASME, 2012); Teaching Excellence in Engineering Education (Imperial College London, 2014). He was the recipient of the prestigious EPSRC Established Career Fellowship, awarded in 2016. The strong links of his group with industrial partners was recognised through the Imperial College President’s Award and Medal for Excellence in External Collaboration and Partnerships in 2017. He received the Donald Julius Groen Prize from the IMechE in 2019. In 2022, Dini was presented with the inaugural Peter Jost Tribology Award from the International Tribology Council at the 7th World Tribology Congress. Dini received the Tribology Silver Medal from the IMechE in 2022.

In 2014, Dini was elected as a Fellow of the Institution of Mechanical Engineers (FIMechE). In 2021, he was also elected as a Fellow of the Society of Tribologists and Lubrication Engineers (FSTLE) and a Fellow of the Royal Academy of Engineering (FREng).
