= Maggie Aderin =

British space scientist and science educator (born 1968)

Dame Maggie Aderin DBE HonFREng
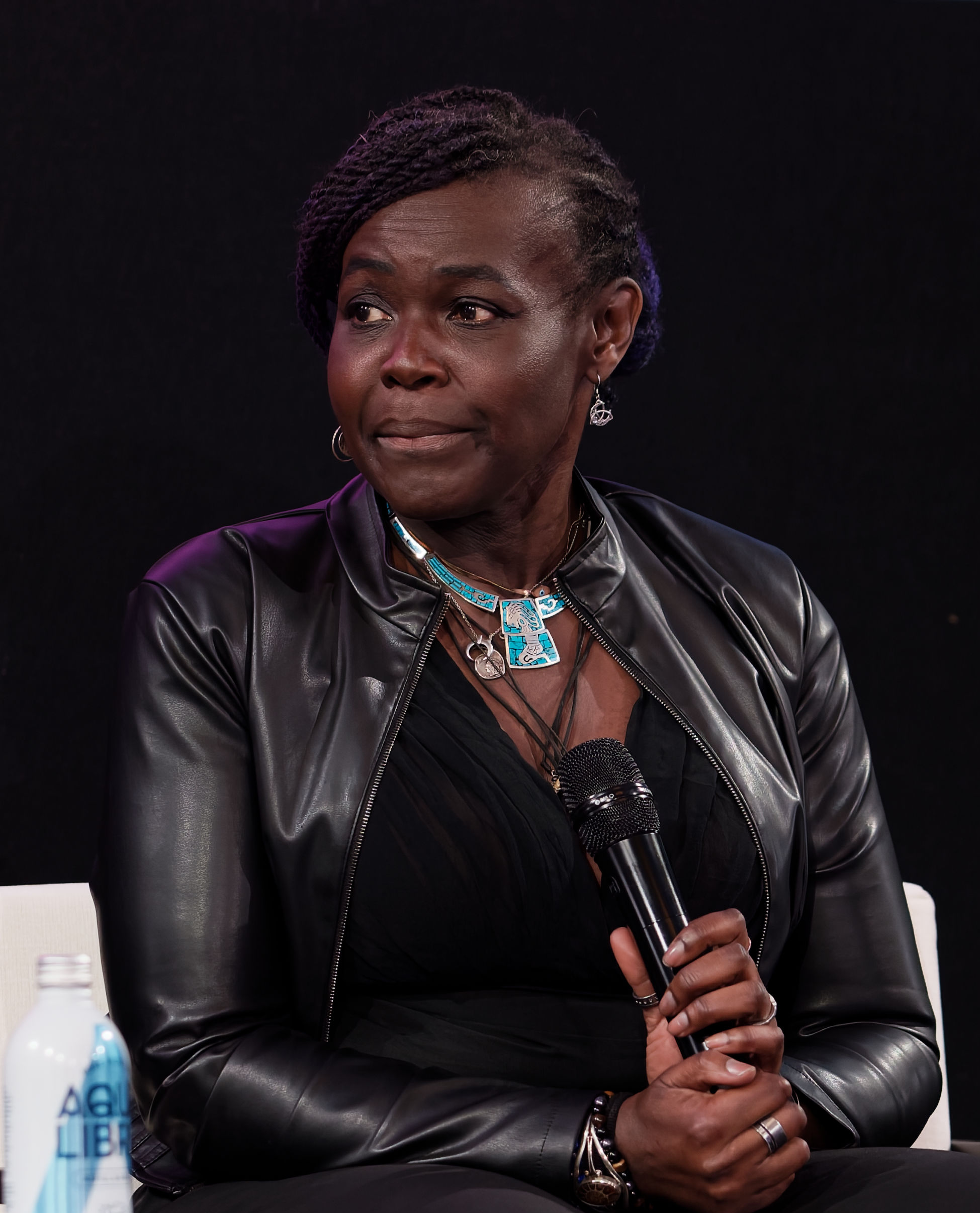
- Aderin in 2026
- Born: Margaret Ebunoluwa Aderin; 9 March 1968 (age 58); Islington, London, England
- Other name: (previously Aderin-Pocock)
- Education: La Sainte Union Catholic School; Imperial College London (BSc, PhD)
- Occupations: Broadcaster, writer, science educator and engineer
- Known for: The Sky at Night
- Spouse: Martin Pocock (m. 2002; sep. 2025)
- Children: 1
- Awards: Honorary degree, Staffordshire University (2009); Honorary Fellow, British Science Association (2010); Honorary Doctor of Science, University of Bath (2014)
- Scientific career
- Fields: Engineering
- Workplaces: University College London
- Thesis: Interferometric Studies of Very Thin Lubricant Films in Concentrated Contacts (1995)
- Doctoral advisor: Prof Philippa Cann

Dame Margaret Ebunoluwa Aderin DBE HonFREng (previously Aderin-Pocock; born 9 March 1968) is a British broadcaster, writer, science educator and engineer. She is an honorary research associate of University College London's Department of Physics and Astronomy, and has been the chancellor of the University of Leicester since 1 March 2023. Since February 2014, she has co-presented the long-running astronomy television programme The Sky at Night with Chris Lintott.

In 2020, Aderin was awarded the William Thomson, Lord Kelvin Medal and Prize from the Institute of Physics for her public engagement in physics. She is the first black woman to win a gold medal in the Physics News Award and she served as the president of the British Science Association from 2021 to 2022.

== Early life and education ==
Margaret Ebunoluwa Aderin was born in London on 9 March 1968 to Nigerian parents, Caroline Philips and Justus Adebayo Aderin, and lived with two older sisters and one younger sister. She was raised partly in Hastings and then Camden, due to her parents separation when she was four. Her mother remarried, Barry a vicar whose vicarage was located in Hastings. Her middle name Ebunoluwa comes from the Yoruba words ebun meaning 'gift' and Oluwa meaning 'God', which is also a variant form of the word Oluwabunmi or Olubunmi, meaning 'gift of God' in Yoruba. She attended thirteen schools including La Sainte Union Convent School in North London which she joined at age fourteen, caring for her father, who was losing his sight. Although suffering from hyperfixation and dyslexia, she joined the top stream and studied intensively. As a child, when she told a teacher she wanted to be an astronaut, it was suggested she try nursing, "because that's scientific, too". She constructed her own telescope and gained A-Levels in mathematics, physics, chemistry, and biology.

She studied at Imperial College London, graduated with a BSc in physics in 1990, and completed her PhD in mechanical engineering under the supervision of Hugh Spikes in 1994. Her research investigated the development of an ultra-thin film measurement system using spectroscopy and interferometry to the 2.5 nm level. This involved improving the optical performance and the mechanical design of the system, as well as the development of control and image processing software. Other techniques at the time could only operate to the micron level with much poorer resolution. This development work resulted in the instrument being sold by an already-existing Imperial College University spin-off company, PCS Instruments.

== Career and research ==
Aderin has worked on many projects in private industry, academia, and government. From 1996 to 1999 she worked at the Defence Evaluation and Research Agency, a branch of the Ministry of Defence. Initially, she was a systems scientist on aircraft missile warning systems; from 1997 to 1999, she was a project manager developing hand-held instruments to detect landmines. In 1999, Aderin returned to Imperial College on a fellowship from the Science and Technology Facilities Council to work with the group developing a high-resolution spectrograph for the Gemini telescope in Chile. The high spectral resolution of the instrument allowed studies of stellar populations, interstellar medium, and some physical phenomena in stars with small masses.

She worked on and managed the observation instruments for the Aeolus satellite, which measured wind speeds to help the investigation of climate change. She is a pioneering figure in communicating science to the public, specifically school children. Her company, Science Innovation Ltd, engages children and adults through its "Tours of the Universe" a programme that explains about the science of space.

Aderin is committed to inspiring new generations of astronauts, engineers and scientists. She has spoken to approximately 25,000 children, many from inner-city schools, explaining how and why she became a scientist, challenging perceptions about careers, class, and gender. She helps encourage scientific endeavours of young people by being a judge at the National Science + Engineering Competition. The finals of this competition are held at The Big Bang Fair in March each year, and reward young people who have achieved excellence in a science, technology, engineering, or mathematics project.

Aderin was the scientific consultant for the 2009 mini-series Paradox, and also appeared on Doctor Who Confidential. In February 2011, she presented Do We Really Need the Moon? on BBC Two. She presented In Orbit: How Satellites Rule Our World on BBC Two on 26 March 2012.

As well as presenting The Sky at Night with Chris Lintott, Aderin has presented Stargazing on CBeebies with Chris Jarvis, and Out of This World on CBBC with her daughter Lauren. She has also appeared on Would I Lie to You?, Dara O Briain's Go 8 Bit, Richard Osman's House of Games, and QI. She held the Dictionary Corner of the 136th episode of the 2023 series of Countdown.

Since 2006, Aderin has served as a research fellow at UCL Department of Science and Technology Studies, supported by a Science in Society fellowship 2010–13 funded by Science and Technology Facilities Council (STFC). She previously held two other fellowships related to science communication, including science and society fellowships 2006–08 Particle Physics and Astronomy Research Council (PPARC) and 2008–10 (STFC). In 2006, she was one of six "Women of Outstanding Achievement" winners with GetSET Women.

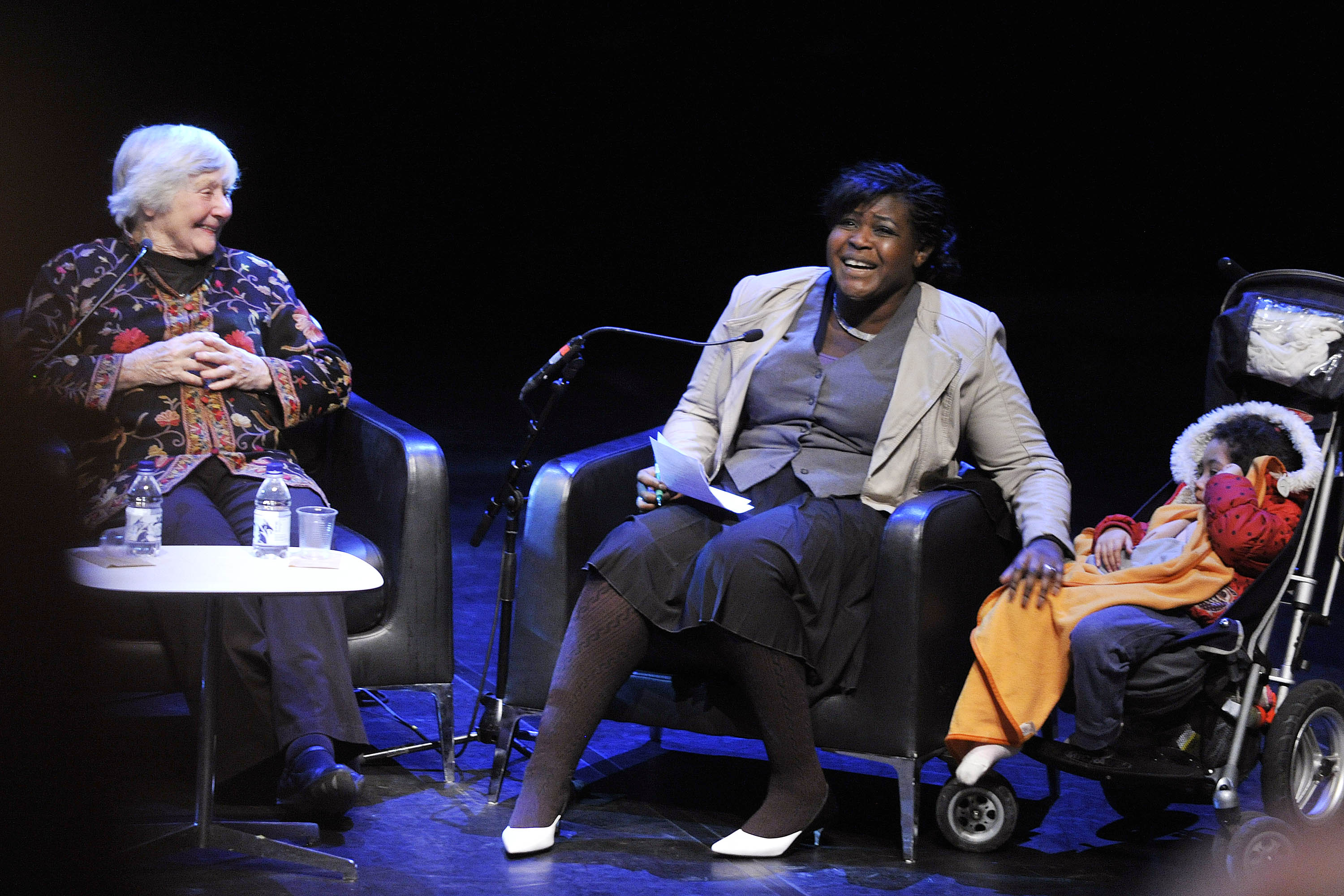
Baroness Shirley Williams and Maggie Aderin, with Aderin's daughter Lauren, discussing Women and Power at the WOW Festival in London in 2014

Between 2014 and 2019, she appeared as an expert in the Sky 1 series, Duck Quacks Don't Echo.

In 2014, the pseudonymously written Ephraim Hardcastle diary column in the Daily Mail claimed that Aderin (along with Hiranya Peiris) had been selected to discuss results from the Background Imaging of Cosmic Extragalactic Polarization 2 (BICEP-2) experiment on Newsnight because of her gender and ethnicity. The comments were condemned by mainstream media, the Royal Astronomical Society and Aderin and Pereis's university, University College London. The Daily Mail withdrew its claim within days, acknowledging that the women were chosen because they are highly qualified in their fields.

Aderin is an honorary research associate of University College London's Department of Physics and Astronomy.

In 2020–21 she served as a commissioner on the UK Government's Commission on Race and Ethnic Disparities (CRED). The commission's controversial report concluded that the "claim the country is still institutionally racist is not borne out by the evidence", but experts complained that the report misrepresented evidence, and that recommendations from business leaders were ignored. After the report was published, Aderin stated that it "was not denying institutional racism existed but said the commission had not discovered evidence of it in the areas it had looked".

Since December 2021, Aderin has been a question-setter for the Channel 4 game show I Literally Just Told You. In 2025, she presented the Royal Institution Christmas Lectures discussing "is there life beyond earth?". The lectures were broadcast on the BBC.

In 2026, Aderin co-presented the fourth season of the BBC podcast 13 Minutes to the Moon covering the Artemis II mission.

== Honours and awards ==
Aderin was appointed a Member of the Order of the British Empire in the 2009 New Year Honours for services to science education, and was elevated to Dame Commander of the Order of the British Empire (DBE) in the 2024 New Year Honours for services to science education and diversity.

- 2005 – Awarded "Certificate of Excellence" by the Champions Club UK
- 2009 – Honorary Doctor of Science, Staffordshire University for contributions to the field of science education
- 2011 – Winner of the "New Talent" award from the WFTV (Women in Film and Television)
- 2012 – UK Powerlist, listed as one of the UK top 100 most influential black people
- 2013 – UK Powerlist, listed as one of the UK top 10 most influential black people
- 2013 – Yale University Centre for Dyslexia "Out of the box thinking award"
- 2014 – Honorary Doctor of Science, University of Bath
- 2016 – UK Powerlist, ranked sixth in most influential Black Briton
- 2017 – Honorary Doctor of Science, Loughborough University
- 2018 – Honorary Doctor of Science, University of Leicester
- 2020 – William Thomson, Lord Kelvin Medal and Prize, Institute of Physics, for her public engagement in physics
- 2022 – appointed as a vice-president of the Royal Central School of Speech and Drama
- 2023 – Mattel created a Barbie doll of Aderin to celebrate International Women's Day.
- 2025 – elected an honorary fellow of the Royal Academy of Engineering (HonFREng)
- 2025 – presenter of the three-part Royal Institution Christmas Lectures, discussing the question "Is there life beyond earth?". The lectures were broadcast on the BBC.
- 2026 – Royal Society David Attenborough Award and Lecture for outstanding public engagement with science.

== Personal life ==
Aderin discussed her life on BBC Radio 4's Desert Island Discs in March 2010, and has been the subject of numerous biographical articles on women in science.

She met her future husband, Martin Pocock at university and they married in 2002, they have one daughter, Lauren, born in 2010. She confirmed to Gyles Brandreth, during their Rosebud podcast, in 2026, that they had separated after twenty-three years of marriage in 2025. She lives in Guildford, Surrey with her daughter.

== Publications ==
- Maggie Aderin, Starchild: My Life Under the Night Sky, BBC Books, 2026 ISBN 978-1785949449
- (as Maggie Aderin-Pocock), The Story of the Solar System: A Visual Journey, BBC Books, 2024 ISBN 978-1785949203
- (as Maggie Aderin-Pocock), Dr. Maggie's Grand Tour of the Solar System, Buster Books, 2019, ISBN 978-1780555751
- (as Maggie Aderin-Pocock), Chelen Ecija, The Knowledge: Stargazing, Quadrille Publishing, 2015, ISBN 978-1849496216
- Aderin, M. "Space Instrumentation: Physics and Astronomy in Harmony?" Paper presented at the Engineering and Physics – Synergy for Success, 5 October 2006, UK.
- Aderin, Maggie (2007). "A Different Sort of School Run". Astronomy & Geophysics. 48 (5): 10–11. Bibcode:2007A&G....48e..10.. doi:10.1111/j.1468-4004.2007.48510.x.
- Barlow, M. J., A. S. Hales, P. J. Storey, X. W. Liu, Y. G. Tsamis, and M. E. Aderin. "Bhros High Spectral Resolution Observations of Pn Forbidden and Recombination Line Profiles." Proceedings of the International Astronomical Union 2, no. Symposium S234 (2006): 367–68.
- Aderin, M. E. "Bhros Installation and System Performance." Paper presented at the Ground-based Instrumentation for Astronomy, 21–25 June 2004, USA.
- Aderin, M., I. Crawford, P. D'Arrigo, and A. Charalambous. "High Resolution Optical Spectrograph (Hros): A Summary of Progress." Paper presented at the Conference on Optical and IR Telescope Instrumentation and Detectors, 27–31 March 2000, Munich, Germany.
- Aderin, M. E., and I. A. Burch. "Countermine: Hand Held and Vehicle Mounted Mine Detection." Paper presented at the Second International Conference on Detection of Abandoned Land Mines, 12–14 October 1998, London, UK. doi:10.1049/cp:19980719
- Aderin, Margaret Ebunoluwa. "Interferometric Studies of Very Thin Lubricant Films in Concentrated Contacts."
- Gunsel, S.; H. A. Spikes; M. Aderin (1993). "In-Situ Measurement of Zddp Films in Concentrated Contacts". Tribology Transactions. 36 (2): 276–82. doi:10.1080/10402009308983159.
- Aderin, M. E.; G. J. Johnston; H. A. Spikes; T. G. Balson; M. G. Emery (1993). "Film-Forming Properties of Polyalkylene Glycols". Journal of Synthetic Lubrication. 10 (1): 23–45. doi:10.1002/jsl.3000100103.
- Cann, P. M., M. Aderin, G. J. Johnston, and H. A. Spikes. "An Investigation into the Orientation of Lubricant Molecules in EHD Contacts." In Wear Particles: From the Cradle to the Grave, edited by D. Dowson, G. Dalmaz, T. H. C. Childs, C. M. Taylor and M. Godet. 209–18: Elsevier Science Publishers, 1992.
- Aderin, M.; G. J. Johnston; H. A. Spikes; G. Caporiccio (1992). "The Elastohydrodynamic Properties of Some Advanced Hydrocarbon-Based Lubricants". Lubrication Engineering. 48 (8): 633–38.
