= Queen Alexandra's Royal Naval Nursing Service =

Royal Naval Nursing Service
- Active: 1884 – present
- Country: United Kingdom
- Branch: Royal Navy
- Type: Nursing
- Role: Medicine

Commanders
- Head of the Naval Nursing Service: Captain Lisa M Taylor
- Patron: HRH Princess Alexandra, The Honourable Lady Ogilvy, LG, GCVO

Insignia
- White Ensign (1801 – present)

- Naval jack

- Red Cross emblem

Queen Alexandra's Royal Naval Nursing Service (QARNNS) is the nursing branch of the British Royal Navy. The Service unit works alongside the Royal Navy Medical Branch.

As of 1 January 2006, according to former Ministry of Defence junior minister Don Touhig, the QARNNS had a total strength of 90 Nursing Officers and 200 Naval Nurses (ratings) out of a requirement of 330.

The Navy List (2006) listed 92 QARNNS Officers, of whom two were captains (including one DNNS/Matron-in-Chief), seven commanders, 19 lieutenant-commanders, 60 lieutenants and four sub-lieutenants. The Navy List (1981) listed 146 QARNNS Officers, of whom one held the rank of Matron-in-Chief, two were Principal Matrons, four Matrons, 32 Superintending Sisters, 89 Senior Nursing Sisters and 13 Nursing Sisters; five of the 145 QARNNS Officers were non-nursing officers: two Senior Clerical and Quarters Officers and three Clerical and Quarters Officers.

== History ==
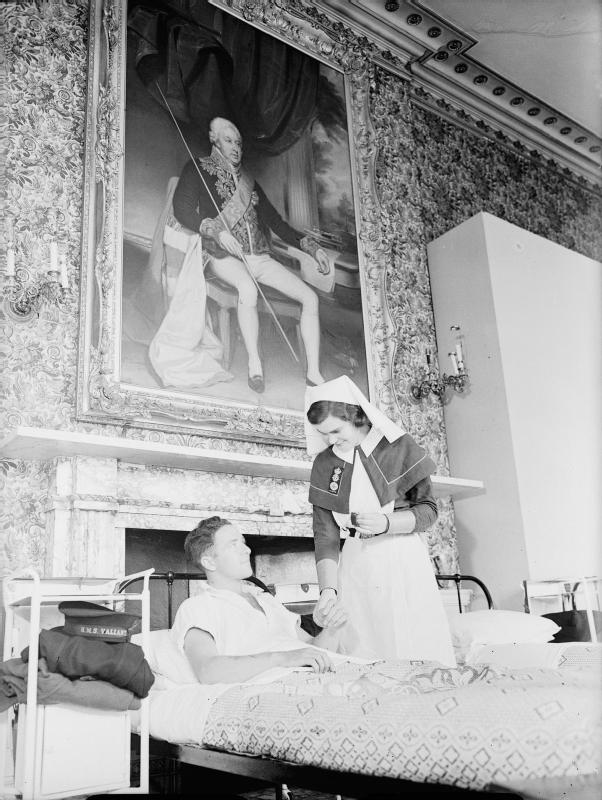
QARNNS nurse takes the pulse of a patient at Cholmondeley Castle during the Second World War

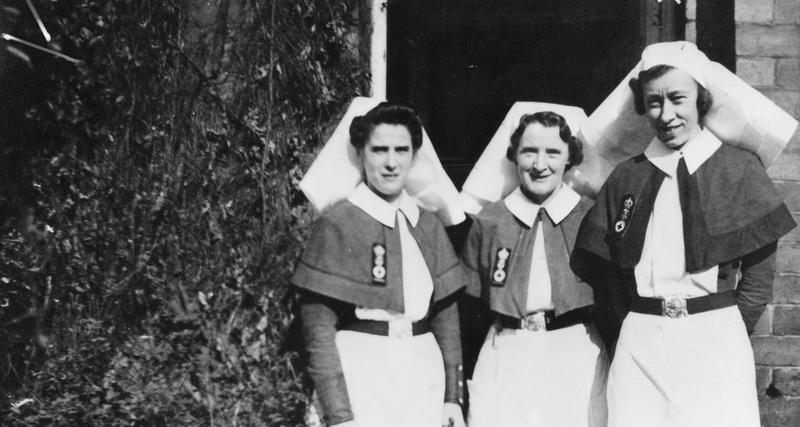
Three QARNNS nurses who received the OBE for rescuing patients from a bombed hospital, 1942

=== Early developments of a Naval Nursing Service ===
The nursing staff who worked at both Haslar, which accepted its first patients in 1753, and Plymouth, which accepted its first patients in 1762, were usually widows of seamen or marines. Their conduct was not regarded as satisfactory. In 1854 the decision was taken to create an all-male nursing service ashore, similar to what there was afloat. The Crimean War (1854–1856) changed the field of nursing. Eliza Mackenzie, a Superintendent of nurses, and six female nurses, travelled to the Naval Hospital, Therapia in Turkey. They left for Therapia on Christmas Day,1854. They were subsequently recognised by the Admiralty for their work. In 1883, a committee determined that improvements were needed in medical and nursing care in the Royal Navy. As such, in 1884, a uniformed Naval Nursing Service was introduced, staffed by trained nurses. These nurses served on shore, initially at Haslar and Plymouth.

=== Queen Alexandra's Royal Naval Nursing Service ===
In 1902, Queen Alexandra became President of the Nursing Staff; in her honour, the Naval Nursing service was renamed Queen Alexandra's Royal Naval Nursing Service. She invited Eva Luckes, Matron of The London Hospital to help her establish the new service, and supplied staff for it. In 1914 Alexandra, wrote to Lückes announcing that she was being awarded the Badge of the Red Cross Society ‘in grateful recognition of the invaluable services you have rendered in the organisation of the Royal Naval Nursing Service...'.

Queen Alexandra's Royal Naval Nursing Service Reserve was established on 13 October 1910.

In 1914, with the outbreak of the First World War, QARNNS was significantly expanded, with many volunteers from the British Red Cross and civilian hospitals.

=== Second World War and until current time. ===
During the Second World War, many volunteer QARNNS nurses were deployed overseas. In 1949 a nursing branch of the Women's Royal Naval Service was formed; however, in 1960 these nurses were integrated into QARNNS, creating a single nursing service. In 1982 an integrated service was formed, allowing men to serve as nurses in QARNNS. The first man to join was Senior Nursing Officer Rajendrasen Purusram, who was commissioned on 1 March 1983.

Although fully affiliated to the Royal Navy from 1977, QARNNS was technically a separate service until 31 March 2000, when it officially became part of the Royal Navy.

Queen Alexandra was President until her death in 1925. The following year she was succeeded by Queen Mary. Princess Alexandra became Patron in 1955.

== Ranks ==
Initially there were only two ranks: Nursing Sister and Head Sister. In 1911 the intermediate rank of Superintending Sister was introduced. There was no overall head of the service until the introduction of the rank of Head Sister-in-Chief on 1 August 1927. By 1937 Head Sister and Head Sister-in-Chief had been renamed Matron and Matron-in-Chief.

The ranking system changed during the Second World War.

QARNNS rank	Equivalent RN rank
Nursing Sister	Lieutenant
Senior Nursing Sister	Lieutenant
Superintending Sister	Lieutenant-Commander
Matron	Lieutenant-Commander/Commander (Note: Lieutenant-Commander until 1976, Commander thereafter.)
Principal Matron	Commander/Captain (Note: Commander until 1976, Captain thereafter.)
Matron-in-Chief	Commodore

Ratings, known as Naval Nurses, were introduced in 1960, with the integration of the WRNS nurses. Their ranking system was similar to that of Royal Navy ratings.

In 1982, in preparation for the introduction of male officers, the Nursing Officers' ranking system was changed.

QARNNS rank	Equivalent RN rank
Nursing Officer	Sub-Lieutenant
Senior Nursing Officer	Lieutenant
Superintending Nursing Officer	Lieutenant-Commander
Chief Nursing Officer	Commander
Principal Nursing Officer	Captain
Matron-in-Chief	Commodore

In 1995 the QARNNS adopted Royal Navy ranks, although the head of the Nursing Service was no longer a one-star equivalent, the senior Captain of the QARNNS was appointed Director Naval Nursing Service (DNNS) and styled with the historic post of Matron-in-Chief.

=== Early Sisters and Superintending Sisters of the QARNNS ===
Several early members of the QARNNS were trained at The London Hospital under Eva Luckes. These included:

- Margaret Emma Goodall Copestake, appointed Sister in 1909 and Superintending Sister by 1918. She died in Malta whilst on service, July 1933.
- Nita Courtice, RRC, appointed Sister in 1909 and Superintending Sister by 1918. Retired in June 1933.
- Emily Jane Gillies Dann, appointed Sister in 1909 and Superintending Sister 1911. Resigned in 1914.
- Gwendoline Dayrell-Reed, appointed Sister in 1909 and Superintending Sister 1911. Resigned in 1913 to marry.
- Florence Henrietta Porter, RRC, appointed Sister in 1894, Acting Head Sister in 1906, Head Sister in 1909 and Superintending Sister -date unknown. Died in 1914.

=== List of senior figures of the QARNNS ===
==== Head Sister-in-Chief, Naval Nursing Service ====
- Margaret Keenan, 1927–1929
- Mildred Hughes, 1929–1934
- Catherine Renwick, 1934–1937

==== Matron-in-Chief, Naval Nursing Service ====
- B. M. Martin, 1937–1940
- Annabella Ralph, 1940–1941
- Dame Doris Beale, 1941–1944
- Dame Matilda Goodrich, 1944–1947
- Olga Franklin, 1947–1950
- Jeannie Gillanders, 1950–1953
- Kathleen Chapman, 1953–1956
- Barbara Nockolds, 1956–1959
- Helen Moore, 1959–1962
- Joan Woodgate, 1962–1966
- Mary Fetherston-Dilke, 1966–1970
- Christina Thompson, 1970–1973
- Cynthia Cooke, 1973–1976
- Patricia Gould, 1976–1980
- Margaret Collins, 1980–1983
- Jean Robertson, 1983–1986
- Eileen Northway, 1986–1990
- Jane Titley, 1990–1994
- Captain Claire Taylor, 1994–1995

==== Director Naval Nursing Service ====
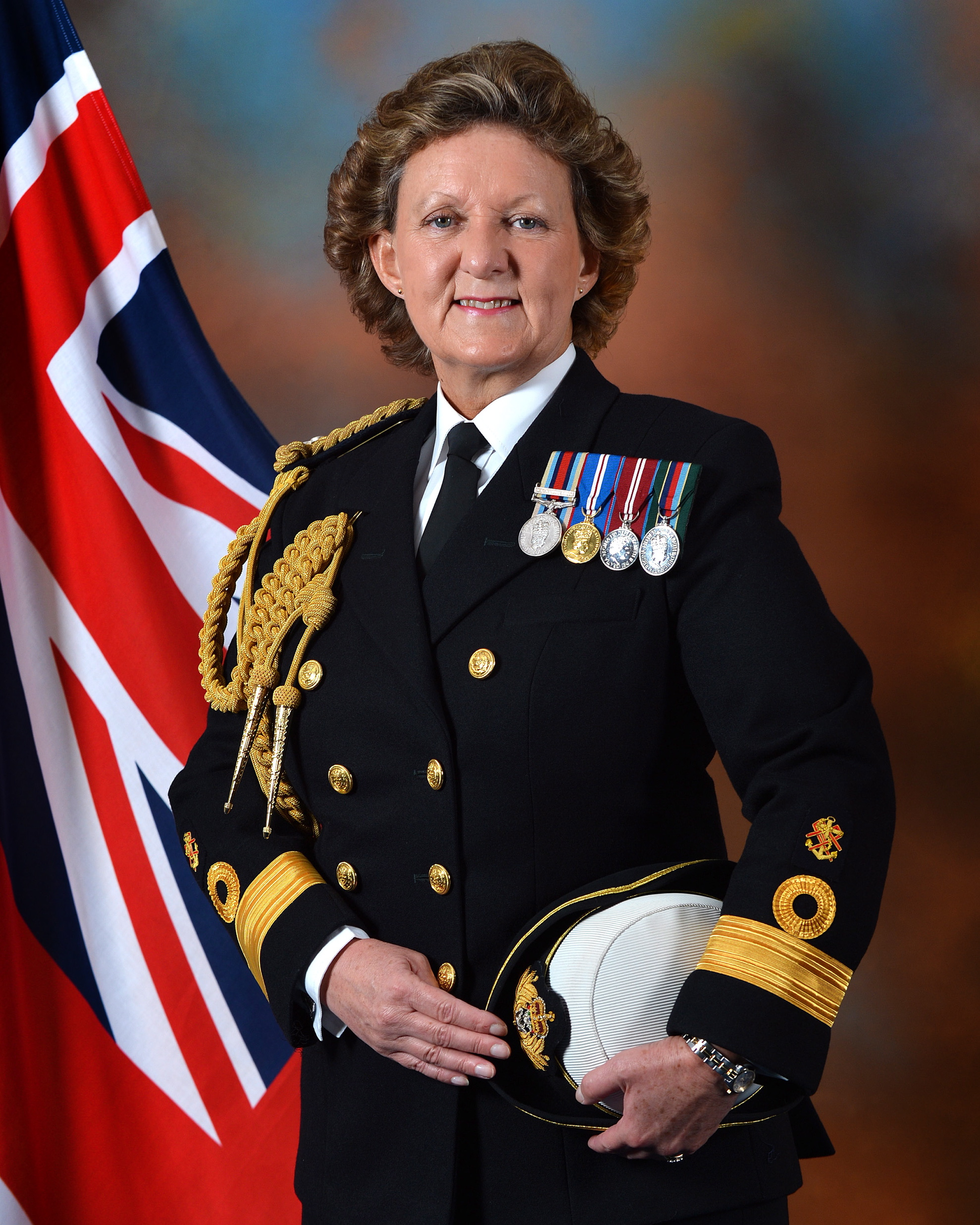
Former Matron-in-chief Commodore Inga Kennedy was appointed Head of the Royal Navy Medical Service in 2017; she wears the QARNNS badge above her rank insignia.

- Captain Claire Taylor, 1995–1996
- Captain Patricia Hambling, 1996–2000
- Captain Michael Bowen, 2000–2003
- Captain Lynne Gibbon, 2003–2008
- Captain Helen Allkins, 2008–2011
- Captain Inga Kennedy, 2011–2015
- Captain Steven J. Spencer, 2015–2018
- Captain Alison J. Hofman RRC, August 2018–October 2019
- Captain Lisa M. Taylor, November 2019–?
- Captain Neale D. Piper ARRC, June 2021–May 2022
- Captain Peter J. Selwood, May 2022 – present

== See also ==
- Queen Alexandra's Royal Army Nursing Corps
- Princess Mary's Royal Air Force Nursing Service
- Royal Navy Medical Branch
