= La Sainte Union College of Higher Education =

Former teacher training college in Southampton

Coordinates: 50°55′20.44″N 1°24′59.90″W

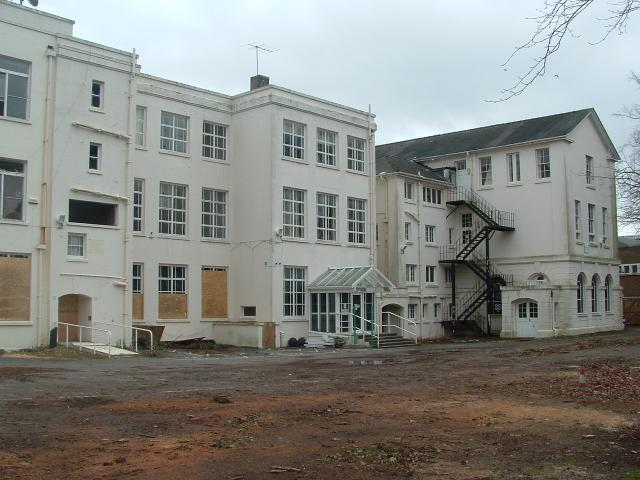
The former college buildings in 2008

La Sainte Union (LSU) in Southampton was a teacher training college. It was owned and run by the La Sainte Union des Sacrés Coeurs order of nuns, and this Catholic background was reflected in the student makeup.

In addition to teacher training, LSU also provided first-degree courses in the Humanities, particularly history (notably American and Soviet), art, English and foreign languages (B.A. Combined Studies, B.A. Modern Foreign Languages & European Studies, Theology). Although the education was provided by independent lecturers and professors the courses were overseen by the University of Southampton, and degrees, both ordinary and honours, were awarded by the university. Towards the end of its time LSU also started moving into medical training.

In April 1997 the Teacher Training Agency withdrew accreditation for the college's teacher training courses following the college's failure to pass an important academic validation inspection, and LSU closed. Bishop of Portsmouth Anthony Emery was quoted as saying "The full story cannot be told at the present time". At that time the college employed 315 staff and had over 2,000 students. The teacher training and art programmes were immediately taken over by nearby education providers, including the University of Southampton, Chichester Institute of Higher Education (now University of Chichester and King Alfred's College, Winchester.

The college campus was immediately taken over by the University of Southampton and became a campus of the university called New College, specialising in adult and continuing education, and art programmes. The New College campus was sold by the university in 2006, and the educational activities on the site moved to Southampton University's main campuses at Highfield, Winchester and Boldrewood.

The campus is now a housing area with a mix of houses and apartments, built by Linden Homes. Most of the original buildings, and the original houses which were used as Halls of Residence in Archers Road, are gone. The two newer Halls of Residence, Gateley Halls and Romero Halls, which were built in 1994, are used by University of Southampton students.

== See also ==
- La Sainte Union Catholic School
- St. Anne's Catholic School (Southampton)
