= I Literally Just Told You =

British game show

- Also known as: Jimmy Carr's I Literally Just Told You
- Genre: Game show
- Created by: Richard Bacon
- Presented by: Jimmy Carr
- Starring: Maggie Aderin-Pocock
- Narrated by: Judi Love
- Country of origin: United Kingdom
- Original language: English
- No. of series: 4
- No. of episodes: 24

Production
- Running time: 47 minutes
- Production companies: Expectation Entertainment; Richard Bacon Media

Original release
- Network: Channel 4
- Release: 16 December 2021 – 2 August 2024

I Literally Just Told You is a British game show that first aired on Channel 4 from 16 December 2021 to 2 August 2024. The programme is hosted by Jimmy Carr. Some questions are multiple choice general knowledge questions, while the majority are memory-based questions about facts and events from earlier in the episode.

== Format ==
Each episode starts with four contestants, and two are eliminated at points within the show, leaving the two finalists to face off against each other. Questions steadily increase in value from £250 to £2,000. Only the winner receives the total prize money both players who made the final round have accumulated. The rounds are:

- Candidate Introduction: All candidates of the show are asked a question about one of the other candidates.
- Money Maker Questions: Contestants are given multiple choice statements with the same set of three possible answers.
- Memory Round: Contestants are asked a question about anything that has happened or was mentioned during the show's recording. One contestant is eliminated.
- Fake Ad Break: The show producers fake an ad break which the candidates may be asked questions about in a later Memory Round.
- Memory Question: All contestants are asked to answer a question about something that has just happened.
- Final Shoot Out: The two finalists ask each other self-written questions similar to the Memory Round questions. The rules in this round are similar to a penalty shoot-out.

Episodes also incorporate segments such as celebrities appearing on-set or in prerecorded clips, or apparent accidents during the recording, to be used in memory questions. When Jimmy walks through a blue door in the studio, he emerges in a different location and a pre-recorded segment plays out. In series 1, science educators Maggie Aderin-Pocock and Emy Adamson have the role of writing questions during the episode. Members of the production crew sometimes feature, and questions can be asked about them. At least half of the questions are written during the filming of the episode.

If two or more contestants are tied for last place at the end of a Memory Round, an additional memory question with a numerical answer is asked to the tied contestants. The contestant furthest away from the correct answer is eliminated.

== Production ==
The show was conceived by Richard Bacon, who is an executive producer: he expected that "most people's short-term memory is so bad you could just give contestants and the audience all the answers in a game show, and they'd still get most of them wrong". Bacon said that Channel 4 was a "perfect fit" for the show and that its "irreverent nature" reminded him of his work on The Big Breakfast.

Host Jimmy Carr said the programme's pitch was the best he had ever heard, believing that the show "will stay crazy for years". He said that unlike most quiz shows, there is "an enormous play-at-home factor", and that the misredirects are comedic. Carr believed he would be good as a contestant, as he uses his memory on stage to remember hundreds of one-liners and audience member names to make callback jokes. He said his "dream" lineup would be other game show hosts.

Following a non-broadcast pilot in autumn 2020, the programme was commissioned by Channel 4 for six hour-long episodes, broadcast in December 2021 and January 2022. The first series was filmed with a small, socially distanced audience, with two episodes recorded per day. A celebrity episode featured contestants Aisling Bea, Alex Horne, Asim Chaudhry and Lorraine Kelly playing for charity.

The fourth episode saw two contestants walk away with prize money, due to an error with a memory question written by a contestant where the answer had not been previously discussed. These questions, in the Final Shoot Out round, are supposed to be verified by production before the contestant asks them. Eddy was asked Ariana Grande's age and gave an incorrect answer, so his opponent won £18,000. Grande's specific age had not been stated earlier in the show, only being compared as younger or older than other celebrities. Shortly after filming, the mistake was discovered and Eddy was presented with a cheque for £18,000 onstage during one of Carr's performances of his tour Terribly Funny at indigo at The O2, which was filmed and included as a tag at the end of the episode.

== International broadcast ==
In March 2024, SBS Australia started showing series 1.

== International versions ==
In July 2021, it was announced that a U.S. version under NBC with Adam DeVine and Ron Funches was in development.

In September 2023, the Belgian public network VRT started a Flemish version of the show.

== Transmissions ==
Note: This section does not cover the subject of the programme's availability on streaming services. At least some of the episodes have been released online before their first run on TV.

Series	Episodes		First broadcast on Channel 4		Source
Series	Episodes		First episode	Last episode	Source
1	6 (Note: This series consists of 5 regular episodes and 1 celebrity special.)		16 December 2021	19 January 2022	
2	8 (Note: This series consists of 5 regular episodes and 3 celebrity specials.)	7	26 September 2022	11 November 2022	
2	8	1 (Note: In 2022 and 2023, in Channel 4’s episode guide, the celebrity Christmas special was listed as ‘series 2 episode 8’. As of January 2024, this episode is not listed as part of series two.)	24 December 2022		
3	5 (Note: This series consists of 4 regular episodes and 1 celebrity special.)	1 (Note: As of January 2024, in Channel 4’s episode guide, the celebrity Christmas special is not listed as part of series three (according to that site, ‘series 3 episode 1’ aired on 19 January 2024).)	22 December 2023		
3	5	4	19 January 2024	9 February 2024	
4 (Note: Originally (in 2023), this set of episodes was being referred to as a continuation of series 3.)	5 (Note: This series consists of 4 regular episodes and 1 celebrity special.)		12 July 2024	2 August 2024	

== Reception ==
In a three-star review, The Daily Telegraph's Anita Singh called it "surprisingly watchable" and praised that Carr "gently mocks the contestants without being remotely cruel"; however she was sceptical that the show could remain interesting across multiple series. Carol Midgley of The Times gave it four stars.
