= Peter Jost =

British mechanical engineer (1921–2016)

(Hans) Peter Israel Jost, CBE (25 January 1921 – 7 June 2016) was a British mechanical engineer. He was the founder of the discipline of tribology, the science and engineering of interacting surfaces in relative motion. In 1966, Jost published a report which highlighted the cost of friction, wear and corrosion to the United Kingdom economy (1.1-1.4% of GDP). It was in this eponymous report that he coined the term tribology, which has now been widely adopted.

== Early life and education ==
Jost was born in Berlin, son of merchant Leo Jost, and Margot (née Jacoby), both of Jewish descent. He was educated at Liverpool Technical College and Manchester College of Technology.

== Career ==
Jost was an apprentice at Associated Metal Works, Glasgow, then at Napier and Sons in Liverpool, where he won the Sir John Larking medal for a paper on measurement of surface finish. At 29, he became general manager of Trier Brothers, an international lubricants company, of which he subsequently became director. Here he developed an innovative method of lubricating steam machinery, which saved energy and water by preventing scaling of boiler tubes. By 1960, he was lubrication consultant to iron, steel and tinplate producers Richard Thomas and Baldwins; he went on to serve as a director and chairman of several technology and engineering companies, including K. S. Paul Ltd, producers of solid lubricants, and Engineering & General Equipment Ltd.

He served on numerous industry councils, and until his death was president of the International Tribology Council and a life member of the council of the Parliamentary and Scientific Committee.

== Awards and recognition ==
The Royal Academy of Engineering noted that "there can hardly be another British engineer with more worldwide honours and decorations".

He was appointed a CBE in 1969, and was also honoured by the heads of state of France, Germany, Poland, Austria and Japan, and in 1992 became the first honorary foreign member of the Russia Academy of Engineering. He received the Order of the Rising Sun, Gold Rays with Neck Ribbon honour from Japan in 2011, the Austrian Cross of Honour for Science and Art, First Class in 2001, and the Order of Merit Cross, First Class from Germany. He held two honorary professorships and 11 honorary doctorates including, in January 2000, the first Millennium honorary science doctorate. He was an honorary fellow of the Institution of Engineering and Technology, the Institution of Mechanical Engineers and of the Institute of Materials. He was awarded the International Award from the Society of Tribologists and Lubrication Engineers in 1997.

Shortly before his death, he was elected an Honorary Fellow of the Royal Academy of Engineering but he died before the Academy's AGM at which this was announced.

He established The Peter Jost Charitable Foundation which promotes the advancement of public education in science and technology through teaching and research, particularly the increase of public knowledge in tribology.

In 2020, the International Tribology Council established the Peter Jost Tribology Award for mid-career tribologists. The inaugural winner of the award was Professor Daniele Dini from Imperial College London, who will be presented the award at the 7th World Tribology Congress in 2022.

== Personal life ==
In 1948, Jost married Margaret Josephine, daughter of Michael Kadesh. They had two daughters.
