= Eliza Mackenzie =

Scottish nurse superintendent (1816 – 1892)

Eliza MacKenzie
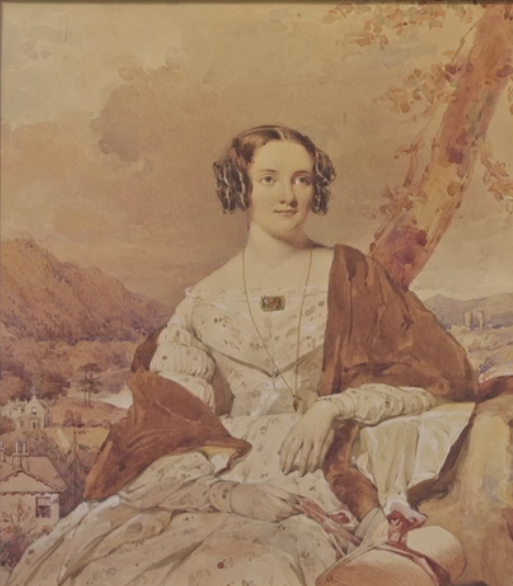
- Aged 23 (watercolour by Kenneth Macleay)
- Born: Eliza Chalmers; 3 July 1816; Glasgow, Scotland
- Died: 18 September 1892 (aged 76); Edinburgh, Scotland
- Education: briefly at Middlesex Hospital
- Occupation: nursing administrator
- Known for: Crimean nurse whose career led to the formation of the Queen Alexandra's Royal Naval Nursing Service
- Successor: Mary Erskine
- Spouse: John Mackenzie

Eliza Mackenzie (born Elizabeth Chalmers; 3 July 1816 – 18 September 1892) was a Scottish superintendent of nurses with the Navy during the Crimean War. Her brief career led to the formation of the Queen Alexandra's Royal Naval Nursing Service (QARNNS) in 1902.

== Early life ==
Elizabeth Chalmers was born in Glasgow, Scotland on 3 July 1816. She was the second of six daughters of Church of Scotland minister and social reformer Thomas Chalmers and his wife Grace (née Pratt).

== Education and early career ==
Mackenzie was a superintendent of nurses, appointed by the Admiralty during the Crimean War. Having accepted this appointment, Mackenzie felt the future of female nursing in the Admiralty hospitals rested with her. If the experiment of allowing female staff to work in Therapia (now Tarabya) was successful, the Admiralty planned to make employing female nurses general practice throughout their hospitals. Therapia was situated north of Constantinople (now Istanbul), on the western shores of the Bosporus. Her work led to the formation of the uniformed Naval Nursing Officers organisation in 1884, which became the Queen Alexandra's Royal Naval Nursing Service (QARNNS) in 1902.

Superintendents were not trained nurses but educated gentlewomen. To prepare for her role in the Crimea she spent three weeks at the Middlesex Hospital in London where she focused on learning hospital management. She was apprehensive about taking up this Superintendent role, partly as she had heard that Florence Nightingale, who had already gone to Scutari Hospital, was able to participate in more advanced healthcare procedures. To prepare herself, Mackenzie did attend the operating theatre to observe the amputation of a leg at St Thomas’ Hospital. She wrote that she was ‘in a rage’ about it as the surgeon did not use chloroform even although it was available.

Mackenzie set off with her group of six nurses (Misses Vessey, Bartlett and Erskine and three others unknown) on Christmas day, 1854 for the Naval Hospital in Therapia. They arrived on 10 January 1855. Of the six nurses, two of them were Fry nurses, having trained at the Institute for Nursing Sisters which was set up by Elizabeth Fry in Guy's Hospital in 1840. Fry nurses wore their own uniform and tended to the spiritual and physical needs of their patients.

The hospital in Therapia was set up by a surgeon, Dr Davidson. It was well equipped in terms of stores, but lacked skilled nurses. Davidson and Dr Deas, at that time serving as Medical Inspector to the Black Sea Fleet, appealed to the Board of Admiralty who finally, in November 1854, agreed to employ female nurses.

Mackenzie left Crimea on 5 November 1855 on doctor's advice. The stressful work had taken its toll on her health and following advice from the doctors she resigned. Mary Erskine, the daughter of Scottish Historian of India, William Erskine took over the Superintendent role. Erskine later wrote to Florence Nightingale saying "Miss Mackenzie, Miss Veysie and myself always cooperated in the work for which we came out till the former left from ill health, to the great regret of us all."

Mackenzie was given a gold and diamond brooch by the Sultan Abdülmecid I in gratitude for her services in 1856. The family still have the jewel and a watercolour of her by Kenneth Macleay. The watercolour and brooch were shown in 2025 on a BBC Antiques Roadshow episode.

== Personal life ==
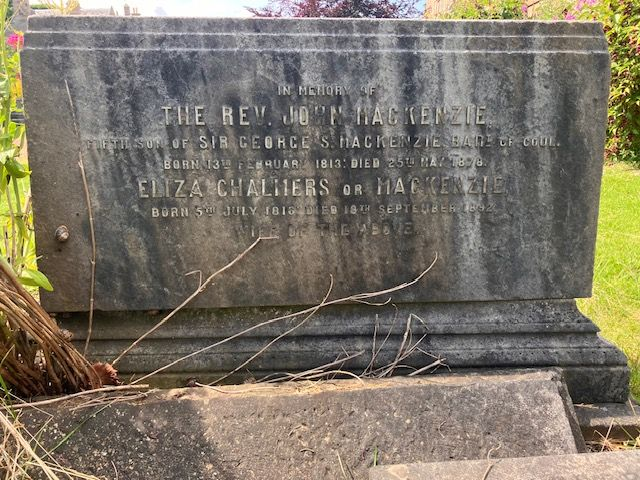
Headstone of Eliza and John Mackenzie at The Grange Cemetery

Mackenzie married John Mackenzie on 13 August 1839 at St Cuthbert's, Edinburgh. He was the fifth son of Sir George Steuart Mackenzie and was an ordained minister. Mackenzie was accompanied on the journey to Therapia by her husband. She had no children.

== Death ==
Mackenzie died in Edinburgh, on 18 September 1892. She was buried in Grange Cemetery, Edinburgh.

== Honours ==
In 1899, the Eliza Mackenzie House Mess for Nursing Sisters of the Queen Alexandra Royal Naval Nursing Service was built and opened at the Royal Hospital, Haslar. In 2014, Eliza Mackenzie Court, providing sheltered accommodation for retired navy and service personnel, was opened in Cosham, Portsmouth.

The Eliza Mackenzie prize for student naval nurses is awarded each year.
