= Doris Beale =

British nurse (1889–1971)

Matron-in-Chief Dame Doris Beale DBE RRC*
- Born: 9 August 1889; Forest Hill, London, England
- Died: 14 January 1971 (aged 81); London, England
- Military career
- Allegiance: United Kingdom
- Branch: Royal Navy
- Service years: 1917–1944
- Rank: Matron-in-Chief
- Commands: Queen Alexandra's Royal Naval Nursing Service (1941–44)
- Conflicts: First World War; Second World War
- Awards: Dame Commander of the Order of the British Empire; Royal Red Cross & Bar; Florence Nightingale Medal

Dame Doris Winifred Beale DBE RRC & Bar (9 August 1889 – 14 January 1971) was a British military nurse and nursing administrator who served as Matron-in-Chief of Queen Alexandra's Royal Naval Nursing Service from 1941 to 1944 during the Second World War. In the 1944 Birthday Honours she was appointed Dame Commander of the Order of the British Empire (DBE), a first in the Royal Naval Nursing Service.

== Early life ==
Beale was born in Forest Hill, London to George Beale and his wife, Annie Maria (née King). She was educated at Lewisham Prendergast School and later trained at The London Hospital Training School for Nurses under Matron Eva Luckes from 1912, where she completed her two years probation, achieving a "very satisfactory" examination result in October 1914.

== Nursing career ==
After two years further training, Beale joined Queen Alexandra's Royal Naval Nursing Service (QARNNS) in 1917. She served at Royal Naval Hospitals in Plymouth and Portsmouth, before spending three years at the Royal Naval Hospital Gibraltar. During this time she was admitted as a member of the College of Nursing, becoming a registered nurse in 1923. She then had two spells nursing at RNH Chatham (1923–25 and 1927–30), either side of two years at RNH Bighi in Malta. Between December 1930 and August 1933, she was in charge of the Cadet Sick Quarters at Dartmouth, before becoming Superintending Sister at RNH Chatham.

On 24 February 1937 Beale was presented with the Associate Royal Red Cross at Buckingham Palace. The following month she was promoted to the position of Matron at RNH Haslar, Portsmouth, and a year later she moved to RNH Stonehouse, Plymouth, where she stayed during the Blitz. In July 1941 she was again promoted, to Matron-in-Chief of QARNNS, retiring in 1944. On 23 September 1941 she received the Royal Red Cross (RRC). In 1943 she became an Officer (Sister) of the Order of St. John of Jerusalem, before receiving a Bar to her RRC in January the following year.

She was Deputy Matron-in-Chief of the Joint War Organisation of the Red Cross Society and the Order of St John of Jerusalem, 1944-1946

Beale was made a Dame on 8 June 1944. She received her British Red Cross Society (BRCS) Distinguished War Service Certificate from the Queen in 1946. In 1951, she was awarded the Florence Nightingale Medal and Certificate by the International Red Cross Committee, presented to her by the Duke of Gloucester.

Beales was governor of Prendergast School, Lewisham from 1945-1964. In 1969 she became a Vice-President of the Hostel for Disabled Women Workers. She was then made the first President of the QARNNS Association in 1970.

== Travel to the Middle East ==
Between October and November 1949, Beale travelled to the BRCS Commission, Jordan, to see the relief work being carried out by British nurses in the area. During this time, she also visited Israel, Syria and the Lebanon. After the visit, she produced a report for the BRCS, giving her findings and outlining her recommendations for future action. In conclusion, she stated:

I should like to place on record my deep appreciation of the kindness shown to me by all members of the Commission and to express my opinion that the splendid work which is being done for refugees by the BRCS Commission cannot fail to raise the standard of British prestige in the Hashemite Kingdom of the Jordan.

Military offices
Preceded by Annabella Ralph	Matron-in-Chief Queen Alexandra's Royal Naval Nursing Service; 1941–1944	Succeeded by Matilda Goodrich
