= Hugh Spikes =

British mechanical engineer

Hugh Spikes FREng FIMechE
- Born: Hugh Alexander Spikes
- Education: University of Cambridge (BA); Imperial College London (PhD)
- Awards: STLE International Award (2004) IMechE Tribology Gold Medal (2004) ASME Mayo D. Hersey Award (2004)
- Scientific career
- Fields: Tribology
- Institutions: Imperial College London
- Thesis: Physical and chemical adsorption in boundary lubrication (1972)
- Doctoral advisor: Alastair Cameron
- Doctoral students: Maggie Aderin-Pocock
- Website: imperial.ac.uk/people/h.spikes

Hugh Alexander Spikes is a British mechanical engineer. He is emeritus professor of tribology at Imperial College London. He is the former head of the Tribology Group at Imperial College. Tribology is the science and engineering of friction, lubrication and wear.

== Early life and education ==
Spikes was born in 1945. He studied the Natural Sciences Tripos at the University of Cambridge, graduating in 1968. He obtained his Doctor of Philosophy for research in tribology from Imperial College London in 1972. His PhD research was performed under the supervision of Professor Alastair Cameron.

== Research and career ==
Spikes has published over 300 peer-reviewed papers and patents in the field of tribology, spanning many aspects of liquid lubricant behaviour ranging from boundary to hydrodynamic lubrication. Another focus of his research has been lubricant additives, particularly antiwear additives and friction modifiers. As of September 2021, Spikes' work had been cited on more than 17,500 occasions and he had a h-index of 74 and an i10-index of 262 (Google Scholar). He is a member of the Distinguished Advisory Board for the International Tribology Council. He is Editor Emeritus for the Wiley journal Lubrication Science and he is a member of the editorial board of the Springer Nature journals Tribology Letters and Friction.

Spikes was the Head of the Tribology Group at Imperial College, he was succeeded in this role by Professor Daniele Dini.

=== Honours and awards ===
In 2004, Spikes was awarded the three major medals that are bestowed internationally for contributions to tribology, the International Award of the Society of Tribologists and Lubrication Engineers (STLE), the Mayo D. Hersey Award of the American Society of Mechanical Engineers (ASME), and the Tribology Trust Gold Medal of the Institution of Mechanical Engineers (IMechE). With his research students, he has also received ten best paper awards, from the STLE, the ASME and the IMechE. In 2019, he received The Tribochemistry Award from the Japanese Society of Tribologists.

In 2012, he was elected as a Fellow of the Royal Academy of Engineering (FREng). He is also a Fellow of the Institution of Mechanical Engineers (FIMechE), a Chartered Engineer (CEng) and a Fellow of the Society of Tribologists and Lubrication Engineers.
