= Grays Convent High School =

- Logo of Grays Convent High School

Location
- College Avenue; Grays, Essex, RM17 5UX; England; 51°28′58″N 0°19′48″E

Information
- Type: Catholic voluntary aided school
- Motto: French: "Nous Sommes Un Avec Dieu" (We Are One With God)
- Religious affiliation: Roman Catholic
- Established: 1899; 127 years ago
- Founders: Sisters of La Sainte Union
- Local authority: Thurrock Council
- Specialist: Language
- Department for Education URN: 115239 Tables
- Ofsted: Reports
- Chair: Laurie Eve
- Headteacher: Penny Johnson
- Deputy Headteacher: Dawn Collis
- Staff: 68
- Gender: Female
- Age: 11 to 16
- Enrolment: 656
- Capacity: 620
- Houses: Deborah; Lydia; Mary; Esther
- Colours: Navy, Red and Gold
- Publication: The Convent Chronicle
- Website: graysconvent.school

Grays Convent High School is a voluntary aided girls' Roman Catholic secondary school in Grays, Essex, England. It is under the jurisdiction of the Diocese of Brentwood's South Essex deanery, and is a specialist language college. The school was originally founded in 1899 as the Convent Day School by the Sisters of La Sainte Union des Sacrés-Coeurs and was on Orsett Road. In 1906 the school relocated to the convent situated in nearby College Avenue, which was at the current school site. In 1969 it became a voluntary-aided comprehensive, being expanded in 1972 with a student population of 666 by 1977. By 2003 it was a Beacon school and was providing a "very good" MFL curriculum, with students' results in French and Spanish being "well above average" according to Ofsted. This likely led to the school's specialisation into a language college, which it had achieved by 2008.

Since 2013 the school has a good Ofsted grade, previously being outstanding since 2008. Currently the school is oversubscribed with a capacity of 620 and a total population of 656 students as of 2021. 21% of students are eligible for free school meals and 24.2% speak English as a second language.

== History ==
=== Convent Day School ===
In 1899 Archbishop of Westminster Herbert Vaughan requested that some Sisters of La Sainte Union arrive to the Grays Thurrock parish to teach in its two schools. Three of the sisters who arrived from France decided to found a new private day school on Orsett Road on 29 October. It was named the Convent Day School and originally had three students on roll. On 24 March 1906, the sisters relocated the school to the convent in nearby College Avenue, with plans to expand. However, the school's population remained extremely low, despite also accepting boys. In 1934 the school saw a rapid increase in popularity and student population because of the construction of a new assembly hall and some classrooms.

Some parts of the school were destroyed during World War II. In the 1950s these parts were rebuilt and another school expansion followed. The school became a voluntary aided comprehensive in 1969, which is likely when the school stopped accepting boys and became Grays Convent High School.

=== Grays Convent High School ===
In 1972 the Grays Convent High School was enlarged, this led to a student population of 666 by 1977. In 1989 most of the Sisters of La Sainte Union left the convent located on the school site, moving into the notorious Dell. This was done to give the school the ability to expand yet again, with an art block, music block and computer suite all being built. In 1995 Philip Kyndt was appointed headteacher, having been serving as deputy head beforehand. In 2003 Ofsted inspected the school, calling it "a very good school with excellent features. It gives good value for money. Standards are above average and achievement of pupils is very good." Sometime between 2003 and 2008 the school specialised as a language college and in 2008 it became an outstanding school after another Ofsted inspection in March. Ofsted described the school during this time as "very popular and heavily over-subscribed." It was also reported that most parents viewed the school as "excellent" and Headteacher Kyndt and his team were highly praised. Around this time two students at the school were in the country's top ten for GCSE exam results. Kyndt would retire after teaching at the school since 1976 in October 2008.

Philip Kyndt was succeeded by Ann-Marie Brister. Brister was previously the headmistress of fellow Catholic school, New Hall School. At first the high standards at the Grays Convent continued to be maintained, with the school's 2010 GCSE results being its highest ever. However, in 2013 the school's results would drop by 10% and the school's Ofsted rating would fall from outstanding to good. In response, Brister announced that she would resign at the end of the year. Following her resignation the school's current head, Penny Johnson, was appointed in April 2014. After Johnson's appointment the school would yet again maintain its high standards, with the school's highest ever GCSE results being celebrated in 2015 and very high results being celebrated in subsequent years.

== School structure ==
The school follows the traditional year group system present in most English and Welsh schools. Students begin at age 11 in Year 7 and end school in Year 11, progressing a year at the beginning of each academic year. In Year 9 students begin GCSE coursework in core subjects and choose their GCSE options. In Year 10 and 11 students work upon what they have learned in Key Stage 3 (years 7 to 9) and work towards their end of year targets, preparing for the GCSE exams in year 11. From Year 9 students can participate in the Duke of Edinburgh Award, competing for bronze in Year 9 and silver in years 10 and 11.

All students are placed into one of four houses, each named after biblical women who espoused the school's qualities that are taught to students. They are Deborah (blue), Lydia (yellow), Mary (green) and Esther (red). The houses are meant to promote community, healthy competition and participation in extracurricular activities. Pastorally, the houses determine the members and names of tutor groups and also provide a form of student voice. This is done through holding house committees and electing house captains from the student cohort in Year 11 and vice house captains in Year 10. The committees consist of house leaders and 12 students. They meet often and determine house events and assemblies. House competitions are held between the houses and a champion house is regularly crowned.

== Notable former pupils ==
- Jessica Judd, cross country and middle-distance runner.
- Jen Craft, Member of Parliament for Thurrock
