= Traverse Theatre =

Theatre company and venue in Edinburgh, Scotland

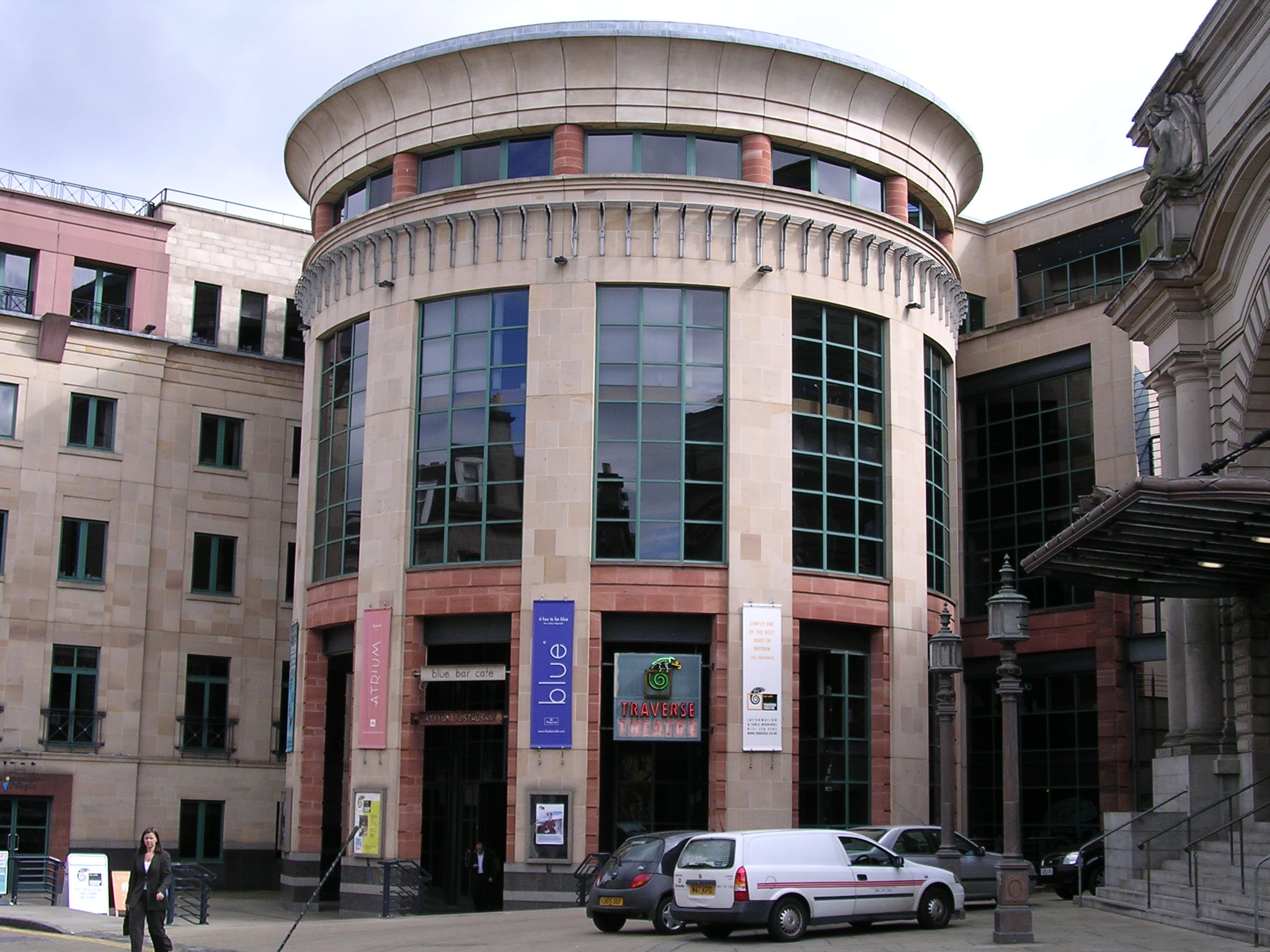
- Traverse Theatre
- Interactive map of Traverse Theatre
- Address: 10 Cambridge Street; Edinburgh; EH1 2ED
- Location: Edinburgh, Scotland, UK
- Coordinates: 55°56′51.43″N 3°12′17.25″W
- Capacity: T1: 214 (end-on) & 284 (festival configuration). T2: 99 (end-on) & 115 (horseshoe).

Construction
- Opened: 1963

Website
- www.traverse.co.uk

The Traverse Theatre is a theatre in Edinburgh, Scotland. It was founded as The Traverse Theatre Club in 1962 by John Calder, John Malcolm, Jim Haynes, Richard Demarco, Terry Lane, Andrew Muir, John Martin and Sheila Colvin.

The Traverse Theatre company commissions and develops new plays or adaptations from contemporary playwrights, often describing itself as "Scotland’s new writing theatre".

The Traverse also presents productions from visiting companies and acts as a host venue for Edinburgh Festival Fringe shows in August. It is also the home of 'Imaginate' the Edinburgh International Children's Festival.

== History ==
The Traverse Theatre Club, originally opened by Cambridge Footlights as "The Sphinx Nightclub", began at 15 James Court, Lawnmarket, Edinburgh, on 20 August 1962. The location was a former doss-house and brothel also known as Kelly's Paradise and Hell's Kitchen. It was "a long, low-ceilinged first-floor room barely 15ft wide by 8ft high" with 60 seats salvaged from the Palace Cinema placed in two blocks on either side of the stage. The theatre is named because Terry Lane mistakenly believed that the staging arrangement is called "traverse"; he later realised that it is "transverse" but it was already too well known to change it. The first performance was on 2 January 1963, with the production of Orison, by Fernando Arrabal.

Following a surveyor's report in March 1969, which stated that the internal floors of James Court were unsafe, the Traverse moved to a former sailmakers's loft at 112 West Bow in the east end of the Grassmarket. This larger space had a 100-seat theatre with flexible seating configurations. The first performance in this venue was on 24 August 1969. In its early days, the theatre included exhibition space for the visual arts, until 1966, when the administrators for that space – including Richard Demarco – moved away to establish what became the Richard Demarco Gallery.

In 1979, Angela Wrapson joined the board of the Traverse Theatre, whose artistic director, her old friend, Chris Parr, was transforming the theatre into a leading new-writing company. In 1983, she became the first female Chair of the Traverse Theatre Committee at a difficult moment in the theatre’s transition from private club to public theatre, steering the organisation deftly through what could have been a terminal crisis. She resigned in 1989.

== Current Traverse Theatre building ==
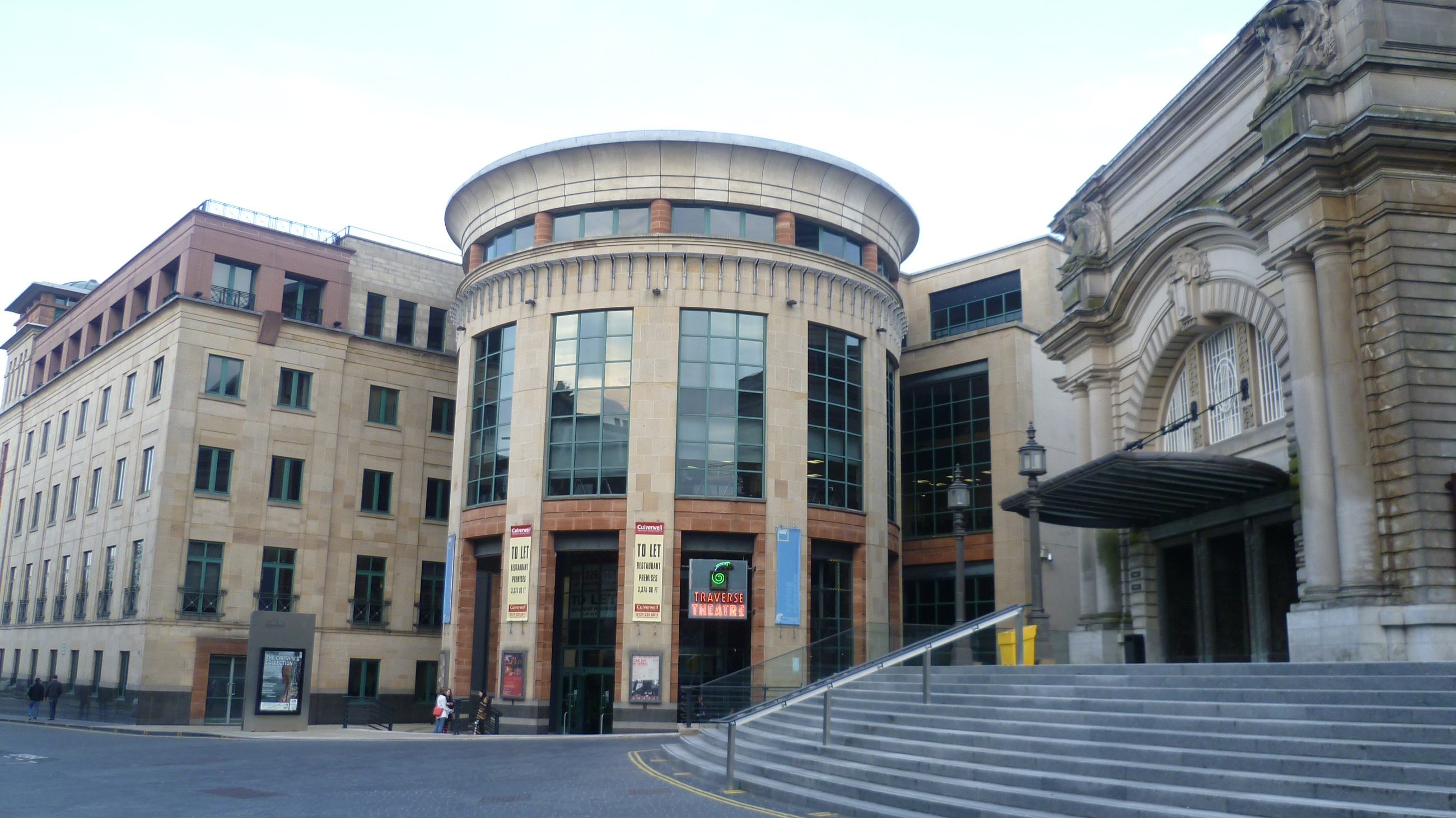
Cambridge Street, with the Usher Hall on the right

In 1992, the Traverse moved to its current location, 10 Cambridge Street, a £3.3 million purpose-built two theatre space with bar café created as part of Saltire Court development on Castle Terrace. The theatre's first performance at this location was on 3 July 1992.

Traverse 1 is the larger space with flexible seating that can be moved to create many different configurations (e.g. transverse, end on, in the round, etc.). The most common configuration is 'end on' and has 214 seats. Traverse 2 is the smaller studio space - with new flexible seating was installed in September 2005 to allow for different staging configurations, the standard capacity is approximately 115 seats.

== The Traverse and the Edinburgh Festivals ==
Founded in 1962, the mission of the Traverse was to continue the spirit of the Edinburgh Festivals all year round.

During the Festivals in August, the Traverse continues to present cutting edge new writing, as well as new work of all kinds to an international audience. The Traverse is occasionally referred to as 'The Fringe venue that got away', reflecting its current status as a permanent and integral part of the Edinburgh arts scene throughout the year.

Although the Traverse programmes work all year round, August remains the busiest time for the Traverse.

In 2010, in a first for Scottish theatre, a series of specially commissioned rehearsed readings by Enda Walsh, Linda McLean, David Eldridge, Simon Stephens and Marina Carr were broadcast live on 23 August 2010 to cinemas across the UK. One third (two of six) of 2010 Scotsman Fringe First Award winners were shows performed at the Traverse.

Theatre critic Lyn Gardner has described the Traverse's programme as "the backbone of theatre on the Edinburgh Fringe." "What you see there will often set the tone and tenor of the rest of the Fringe."

== Notable associations ==
From its beginning in 1963, the Traverse Theatre has launched the careers of many of Scotland's best-known writers including John Byrne, Gregory Burke, David Greig, David Harrower and Liz Lochhead.

During the 1960s Richard Wilson was a regular performer. Throughout the 1970s the Traverse Theatre hosted actors including Timothy Dalton, Billy Connolly, Robbie Coltrane, Ann Mitchell, Simon Callow, Bill Paterson and Steven Berkoff. In 1978 David Hayman famously directed John Byrne's Slab Boys which featured Robbie Coltrane.

Tilda Swinton and Forbes Masson memorably performed during the 1980s and Steve Unwin directed Alan Cumming in a 1988 production of The Conquest of the South Pole. Ashley Jensen and Bill Nighy began their acting careers at the Traverse.

Many of the theatre's sponsored seats have personalised plaques, including Robbie Coltrane's "This is a no farting zone" and Tom Conti's "In memory of my longest dry".

== Artistic directors ==
- Terry Lane (Dec 1962 – Jan 1964)
- Callum Mill (Jan 1964 – Aug 1964)
- Jim Haynes (Aug 1964 – July 1966)
- Gordon McDougall (July 1966 – Dec 1969)
- Max Stafford-Clark (Dec 1967 – Dec 1969)
- Michael Rudman (Feb 1970 – Feb 1973)
- Mike Ockrent (Mar 1973 – Sep 1975)
- Chris Parr (Sep 1975 – Mar 1981)
- Peter Lichtenfels (Apr 1981 – Aug 1985)
- Jenny Killick (Sep 1985 – Dec 1988)
- Ian Brown (Jan 1989 – Aug 1996)
- Philip Howard (Sep 1996 – Dec 2007)
- Dominic Hill (Jan 2008– Oct 2011)
- Orla O'Loughlin (Jan 2012 – Dec 2018)
- Gareth Nicholls - Interim Artistic Director (Dec 2018 – Present)

== Controversies ==
- At the second Traverse performance on 3 January 1963, lead actress Colette O'Neil was accidentally stabbed on stage. The knife, which was real, had caught in the folds of her costume and had gone into her side. The actress went on with the rest of the performance and was seen to at the end by a doctor who had been in the audience and later taken to hospital. John Martin (co-founder of the Traverse and an early chairman of the board) says that the real knife was used because the space was so small and the audience sat so close to the stage a fake knife would have been detected. Richard Demarco says it was because they had no money and could not afford a paper one.
- Throughout 1965 the Traverse Theatre Club was threatened with police raids due to homosexual themed content and fraternisation in a time when it was illegal.
- At the 1967 Edinburgh Festival, 22 Traverse Theatre shows were performed; including Rochelle Owens' Futz!, which the Daily Express described as "Filth on the Fringe", and Alfred Jarry's Ubu in Chains, which featured Ma and Pa Ubu as 6-foot tall sexual organs.
- At a meeting in 1971, Artistic Director Michael Rudman persuaded the Edinburgh Corporation to increase the Traverse grant but refused to give any assurances on the 'decency' of future productions.

== See also ==
- Royal Lyceum Theatre
- Usher Hall
