= St Catherine's Catholic School for Girls =

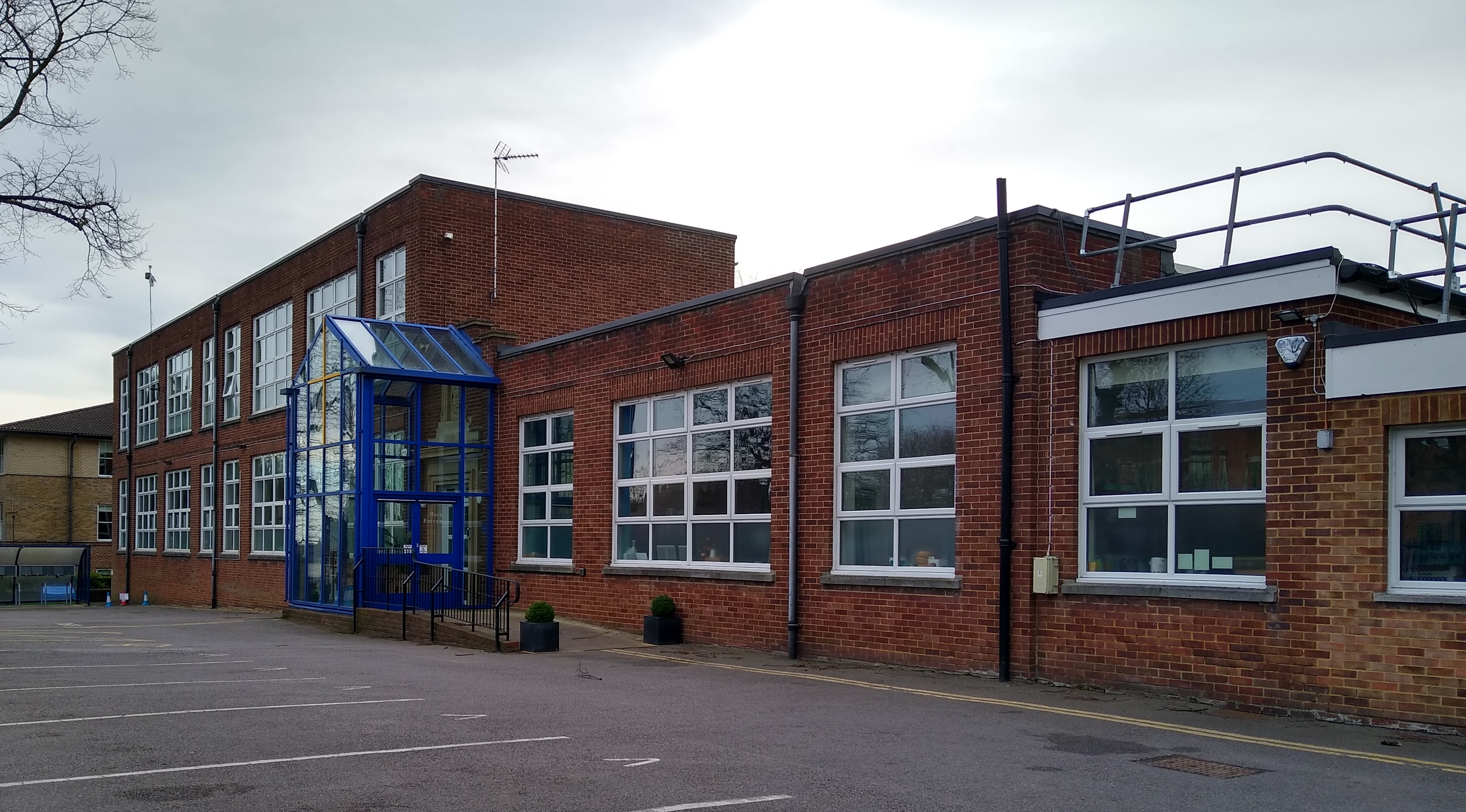

Location
- Watling Street; Bexleyheath, Greater London, DA6 7QJ; England; 51.45408°N 0.15687°E

Information
- Type: Academy
- Religious affiliation: Roman Catholic
- Established: 1953
- Department for Education URN: 137681 Tables
- Ofsted: Reports
- Headteacher: Nicola Thompson
- Gender: Girls
- Age: 11 to 16
- Houses: Frances, Cecilia, Angela, Adele
- Website: www.stccg.co.uk

St Catherine's Catholic School for Girls is a Roman Catholic girls' secondary school located in the Bexleyheath area of the London Borough of Bexley, England.

The school was established by La Sainte Union (Holy Union) sisters in 1953 as a convent school. It was converted to with academy status in February 2012, and was previously under the direct control of Bexley London Borough Council. The school continues to coordinate with the London borough of Bexley for admissions.

St Catherine's Catholic School for Girls offers GCSEs as programmes of study for pupils. Pupils also have the option to study equivalent vocational courses in certain subjects.
