= St Anne's Catholic School, Southampton =

Coordinates: 50°54′53″N 1°24′20″W

St Anne's Catholic School and Sixth Form

Location
- Carlton Road; Southampton, Hampshire, SO15 2WZ; England

Information
- Type: Academy
- Motto: Semper Fidelis (Always faithful)
- Religious affiliation: Roman Catholic
- Established: 1904
- Department for Education URN: 138476 Tables
- Ofsted: Reports
- Head teacher: Julian Waterfield
- Gender: Girls; coeducational sixth form
- Age: 11 to 18
- Enrolment: 1239
- Capacity: 1079
- Houses: 7
- Colours: Blue and yellow
- Diocese: Portsmouth
- Website: www.st-annes.uk.com

St Anne's Catholic School (known as St Anne's Convent School until 2006) is an 11-18 secondary school in Southampton, England, for girls. The school's sixth form is coeducational. The school is close to the city centre, and has pupils from all round the city and beyond. The school converted to academy status in August 2012. As of 2025, the school and sixth form had 1239 pupils.

== History ==
St Anne's Convent School was established in 1904 by the La Sainte Union Sisters and is still under their trusteeship.

Girls from this school joined Talbot Heath School in Bournemouth during WW2 as they were moved to safety. That school was open throughout the war.

St Anne's was the first direct grant grammar school to convert to a comprehensive intake. After over a century of single-sex education, boys were admitted into the sixth form for the first time beginning in the 2006–07 school year. The word "convent" was dropped from the school's official title to reflect this change.

== Child abuse charges and convictions ==
In 2024, the school's former headteacher, in post until 2023, was charged with child sexual abuse. He was later acquitted of the charge in 2026. The police said that four other teachers at the school were also under investigation. In January 2025, another former teacher was charged with rape and abuse of a position of trust; he was convicted in February 2026 and sentenced to six years' imprisonment. The school made a statement, saying that "While we do not know the full details of the allegations, there is no shying away from the severity of the charges". A third former teacher was charged in April 2025 with offences of sexual activity against a child. A fourth was charged in May 2025; he was convicted in October 2025 and sentenced to 14 months' imprisonment. In July 2026, a fifth teacher was charged with sexual assault alleged to have taken place between 1971 and 1973.

== Premises ==
The school occupies a site on the corner of Carlton Road and Carlton Crescent back to Rockstone Place. Nos. 11 and 12 Carlton Crescent are Grade II listed buildings. The westwards extension of No. 12 was built in 1961, for which the architects, Richard Sheppard, Robson & Partners, received a Civic Trust design award; this was described as "a model of neighbourly treatment in terms of scale character and materials, and an outstanding example of a modern building meeting present-day requirements yet harmonising beautifully with an earlier style".

== Academics ==
The school annually achieves significantly better than the national average. The progress students make from starting at age 11 places it in the top 10% of schools nationally. The school's 5A*-C indicator has been in the 70-80% range for the past four years. It achieved an English Baccalaureate result of 47% in 2015. It regularly ranks at the top of the A Levels results table for non-independent schools in Hampshire.

== Ofsted inspection reports ==
The last full inspection of the school by Ofsted was in 2016. The inspection team rated the overall effectiveness of the school as Outstanding in all areas, including the sixth form. A short inspection in 2022 repeated the judgement of Outstanding.

== Notable former pupils ==
- Margaret Collins, nurse and senior Royal Navy officer
- Satvir Kaur, Member of Parliament for Southampton Test and former leader of Southampton City Council
- Angela Wrapson, arts consultant and chair of the Traverse Theatre in Edinburgh
