= Margaret Collins (nurse) =

Matron-in-Chief Margaret Collins CBE RRC
- Born: 13 February 1927
- Died: 26 January 2023 (aged 95); Henfield, West Sussex
- Military career
- Allegiance: United Kingdom
- Branch: Royal Navy
- Service years: 1953–1983
- Rank: Matron-in-Chief
- Commands: Queen Alexandra's Royal Naval Nursing Service (1980–83)
- Awards: Commander of the Order of the British Empire; Royal Red Cross

Margaret Elizabeth Collins, CBE, RRC (13 February 1927 – 26 January 2023) was a British nurse and Royal Navy officer. Having served in the UK, Hong Kong, Malta and Gibraltar, she rose to become matron-in-chief of the Queen Alexandra's Royal Naval Nursing Service (1980 to 1983), her period of command coinciding with the Falklands War.

== Biography ==
Collins was educated at St Anne's Convent School, an all-girls Catholic school in Southampton. She trained as a nurse at Royal Victoria Hospital, Bournemouth, qualifying as a state registered nurse (SRN) in 1949.

In the 1978 Queen's Birthday Honours, Collins was appointed Member of the Royal Red Cross (RRC). In the 1983 New Year Honours, she was appointed Commander of the Order of the British Empire (CBE).
