= Holy Union Sisters =

Sisters of the Holy Union of the Sacred Hearts
- Abbreviation: S.U.S.C.
- Formation: 1842; 184 years ago
- Founder: Jean Baptiste Debrabant
- Type: Female Catholic religious congregation
- Headquarters: Rome, Italy
- Website: https://www.holyunionsisters.org

The Holy Union Sisters, officially known as the Sisters of the Holy Union of the Sacred Hearts (French: Sœurs de la Sainte Union des Sacrés Coeurs), are a religious congregation of women in the Roman Catholic Church founded at Douai, France, in 1842, by Jean Baptiste Debrabant (1801 - 1889).

== History ==
The congregation has its roots in the 1820s, with four young women who earned their livelihood as dressmakers, but shared a strong religious faith. In the chaotic social situation of post-Revolutionary France, they soon decided to live together to support each other in their commitment and to share a life of prayer and service. The women began to teach the faith to the local children.

In 1826 a young priest, Jean Baptiste Debrabant (1801-1880), was sent as a to their town. Impressed by this small community of dedicated women, Debrabant saw in them a vehicle to help educate the children of the region. He encouraged and guided them in their way of life, which began to draw many young women to join the original four. In addition to their catechetical work, they begin to train young girls housed in a shelter they had opened in their craft of dressmaking. In 1841 Debrabant approached his bishop, Pierre Giraud, the Archbishop of Cambrai, seeking recognition of the women as a religious congregation.

Permission was received and in 1842 over one hundred woman were admitted to a canonical noviatiate as an Institute of diocesan right. (This group, however, included only one of the original four members of the community.) The new congregation was then given its current name and a Rule of Life based primarily on that of the Order of the Visitation of Holy Mary, founded by Francis of Sales and Louise de Marillac. The Sisters professed religious vows a year later.

The congregation quickly spread in answer to appeals for teachers in Catholic schools worldwide. It was approved by the Holy See and elevated to one of pontifical right in 1877. By the end of the century, they had come to administer schools in France, Belgium, England, Ireland, Argentina and the United States.

== Current status ==
Today the Sisters also serve in Italy, Cameroon, Haiti and Tanzania.

== Education ==
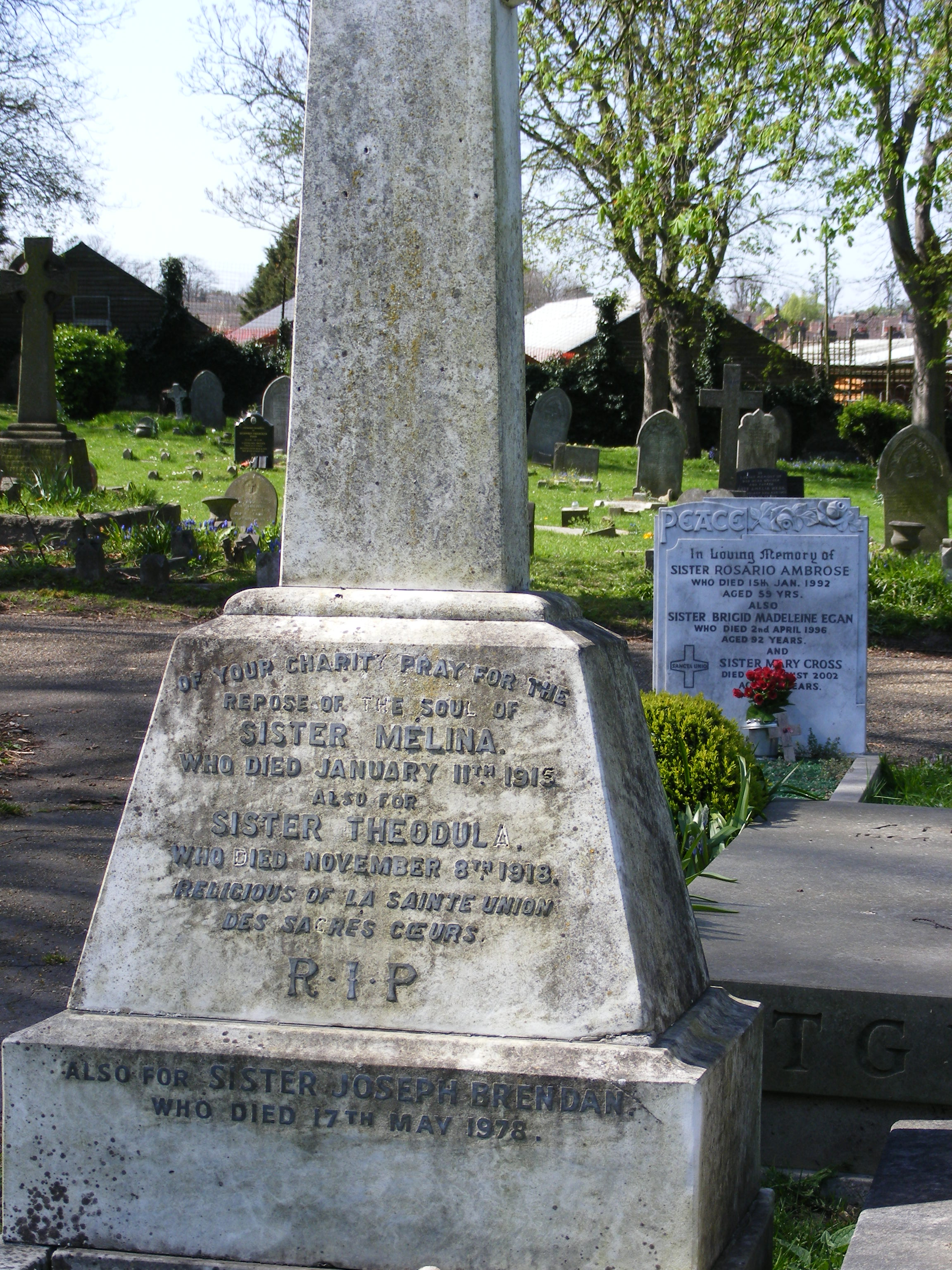
A gravestone dedicated to Sisters Melina and Theodula, two of the three Holy Union Sisters who founded Grays Convent High School, Grays, England

The Sisters devote themselves to the education of youth and have founded schools in multiple countries. Some of these schools are still run by the Sisters today.

Date founded	School	Location
1858	Saint Gregory's Catholic College	Bath, England
1861	La Sainte Union Catholic School	Highgate, England
1863	Banagher College	Banagher, Ireland
1887	Sacred Heart School	Fall River, United States
1899	Grays Convent High School	Grays Thurrock, England
1904	St Anne’s Catholic School	Southampton, England
1905	Sacred Heart School	Lawrence, MA, United States
1923	St. Mary-Sacred Heart School	North Attleborough, MA, United States
1947	Sacred Heart School	Mount Ephraim, NJ, United States
1949	Country Day School of the Holy Union	Groton, MA, United States
1953	St Catherine’s Catholic School	Bexleyheath, England
1956	Holy Cross Catholic Primary School	South Ockendon, England
1959	Holy Name School	Fall River, MA, United States
2008	Debrabant Secondary School	Dar es Salaam, Tanzania
2018	Holy Union Primary School	Dar es Salaam, Tanzania
