= Willy Bauer =

German motorcycle racer (born 1947)

- Nationality: German
- Born: 17 November 1947 (age 78) Stuttgart, Germany

Motocross career
- Years active: 1969–1978
- Teams: Maico, Suzuki, KTM, Sachs
- Wins: 4

Willy Bauer (born 17 November 1947) is a German former professional motocross racer. He competed in the FIM Motocross World Championships between 1969 and 1978, most prominently as a member of the Maico factory racing team. Bauer narrowly missed winning the 1973 500cc Motocross World Championship after a season long battle with the reigning champion Roger De Coster. His racing career ended when he suffered spinal cord injuries while competing in the 1978 250cc British Grand Prix.

== Motocross racing career ==
=== Early racing ===
Bauer was born on 17 November 1947 in Stuttgart, West Germany where his father owned an auto repair business. He began racing motorcycles in 1964 and in 1965 he was sponsored by the 1957 250cc European Motocross Champion Fritz Betzelbacher. Bauer rode a Montesa motorcycle to win the 1967 German national championship. In 1968, he rode for the West German importer of ČZ motorcycles before joining the Maico factory racing team in 1969 alongside teammates Åke Jonsson and Adolf Weil.

=== Maico factory team ===
At the age of 21, Bauer scored his first Motocross World Championship points at the 1969 250cc West German Grand Prix. In his first full season of competition, he finished eighth in the 1971 500cc Motocross World Championship. After the world championships, Bauer traveled to the United States to compete in the 1971 Trans-AMA motocross series. The Trans-AMA series was an international series established by the American Motorcyclist Association as a pilot event to help establish motocross in the United States. He finished the series ranked seventh overall behind his Maico teammate Weil who finished the series in second place behind the overall winner Sylvain Geboers (Suzuki).

Bauer scored his first podium result in 1972 when he finished second overall to Roger De Coster (Suzuki) at the season opening 500cc Austrian Grand Prix. He also finished third overall at the 1972 500cc Swedish Grand Prix behind De Coster and Weil. De Coster dominated the 500cc World Championship from start to finish, winning six of twelve Grand Prix races to clinch the title with two races remaining on the schedule. Bauer ended the season ranked ninth, just behind his teammate Weil in eighth place.

With no weight limit rules imposed by the FIM, Suzuki had been able to dominate the 1972 season by developing extremely lightweight motorcycles. Without the financial resources to maintain the technological pace, European manufacturers protested to the FIM who responded by implementing new weight restrictions for the 1973 season. When Jonsson was lured away from Maico to join the Yamaha team in 1973, Gerrit Wolsink was hired to replace him as Bauer's teammate while Weil transferred to the 250cc championship.

The 1973 season marked the highpoint of Bauer's career. The season was dominated by Bauer and De Coster as the two riders engaged in a season-long battle for the 500cc World Championship. After scoring a third place at the season opening French Grand Prix, Bauer joined most of the riders in boycotting Round 2 in Austria as heavy snow covered the racetrack. Since the event would be broadcast live on Austrian television, race promoters decided to hold the race but not award world championship points due to the difficult riding conditions. Both Bauer and DeCoster chose not to race since there were no championship points available as Jiří Stodůlka (ČZ) won the race. The decision not to award points for the Austrian Grand Prix results reduced the 500cc World Championship to nine rounds. This decision played an outsized role in the outcome of the 1973 World Championship at the end of the season.

De Coster took the championship points lead by winning both heat races at the Italian Grand Prix but, Bauer responded by winning the first overall victory of his career at Round 5 in Czechoslovakia where he relegated De Coster to second place in both races. At the following 500cc United States Grand Prix held at the Carlsbad Raceway, he battled De Coster for the lead early in the first heat race, before he took the win by a comfortable margin. Bauer easily won the second leg after De Coster experienced a mechanical failure.

At Round 7 in his home Grand Prix in West Germany, Bauer scored a victory in the first heat race and was leading De Coster by 20 seconds in the second heat race, when he was forced to abandon the race after a stone thrown by a competitor's motorcycle struck his eye. At the next round in Belgium on De Coster's home circuit in Namur, Bauer recovered to win both heat races. The rugged, narrow Belgian racetrack was set in the forests surrounding the picturesque hilltop Citadel of Namur. First held in 1947, the Namur Grand Prix was revered by motocross enthusiasts in the same manner that auto racing enthusiasts considered the Monaco Grand Prix to be the crown jewel of the Formula One season.

Going into the final race of the season at Sint Anthonis, Holland, Bauer held a four-point lead over De Coster in the championship points standings. Bauer failed to score any points as he experienced mechanical failures in both heat races while De Coster scored two fourth place finishes. Bauer was declared the provisional 500cc World Champion based on FIM scoring system that allowed competitors allowed competitors to drop their worst scores.

However, one month after the final race of the season, an FIM Jury ruled that the boycotted Austrian Grand Prix results must count towards the world championship which raised the number of races during the season from 18 to 20. The ruling allowed De Coster to gain more points as he had scored points more consistently than Bauer during the season. While Bauer won 7 races to De Coster's 5 wins, Bauer only had one second place finish to De Coster's five second place finishes. The FIM Jury decision awarded De Coster the World Championship by two points over Bauer. After the world championships, Bauer traveled to the United States to compete in the 1973 Trans-AMA series where he won Round 5 in Washington, Indiana and finished the series ranked third overall behind his Maico teammates Weil and Wolsink.

Wolsink left the Maico team to join the Suzuki team and Weil returned to the 500 class as Bauer's teammate for the 1974 season. When he discovered that Weil was receiving preferential treatment from the Maico factory, his relationship with the team deteriorated. After finishing the 1974 season ranked sixth in the 500 class, he returned to the United States where he finished sixth in the 1974 Trans-AMA motocross series.

=== Later career and injury ===
Bauer then signed a contract to race for the Suzuki team with the assistance of Wolsink and De Coster. Suzuki already had Wolsink and De Coster competing in the 500 class, so Bauer competed in the 250cc Motocross World Championship with six-time World Champion Joël Robert as his teammate. Bauer won the 250cc Czechoslovak Grand Prix and finished the 1975 season in third place behind Harry Everts (Puch) and Hakan Andersson (Yamaha).

After being released by the Suzuki team, Bauer returned to the 500cc class with the KTM factory racing team in 1976 and placed tenth in the world championship. After a 12th-place finish in 1977, he signed a contract to race and develop a prototype motorcycle for the Sachs factory in the 1978 250cc world championship. At the 1978 British motocross Grand Prix held at a steeply undulating circuit in Kilmartin, Scotland, Bauer crashed and sustained spinal cord injuries that left him paralyzed.

== Career overview ==
Bauer won seven individual heat races and four Grand Prix victories during his world championship racing career. Although he never won a World Championship, he was the 1973 500cc Vice Champion and won four 250 and one 500cc German Motocross National Championships (250: 1971-1975, 500: 1975). Bauer was a member of three German Motocross des Nations teams (1974-1976), with a best result being a third place at the 1976 event behind the Belgian and Dutch teams

== Motocross Grand Prix Results ==
Points system from 1969 to 1980:

Position	1	2	3	4	5	6	7	8	9	10
Points	15	12	10	8	6	5	4	3	2	1

Points system from 1984:

Position	1st	2nd	3rd	4th	5th	6th	7th	8th	9th	10th	11th	12th	13th	14th	15th
Points	20	17	15	13	11	10	9	8	7	6	5	4	3	2	1

Year	Class	Team	1		2		3		4		5		6		7		8		9		10		11		12		Pos	Pts
Year	Class	Team	R1	R2	R1	R2	R1	R2	R1	R2	R1	R2	R1	R2	R1	R2	R1	R2	R1	R2	R1	R2	R1	R2	R1	R2	Pos	Pts
1969	250cc	Maico	ESP -	ESP -	CH -	CH -	YUG -	YUG -	TCH -	TCH -	POL -	POL -	GER; 8	GER; 7	NED -	NED -	FRA -	FRA -	UK -	UK -	SWE -	SWE -	FIN -	FIN -	USR -	USR -	33rd	4
1969	500cc	Maico	AUT -	AUT -	SWE -	SWE -	NED -	NED -	ITA -	ITA -	TCH -	TCH -	USR -	USR -	GER; 9	GER; 9	BEL -	BEL -	LUX -	LUX -	FRA -	FRA -	CH -	CH -	GDR -	GDR -	31st	2
1970	250cc	Maico	ESP -	ESP -	FRA -	FRA -	BEL -	BEL -	YUG -	YUG -	ITA -	ITA -	USR -	USR -	POL -	POL -	UK -	UK -	FIN -	FIN -	GDR -	GDR -	CH; 9	CH; 9	AUT -	AUT -	25th	3
1970	500cc	Maico	CH -	CH -	AUT; 13	AUT; 13	NED -	NED -	FRA; 13	FRA; 9	FIN -	FIN -	SWE -	SWE -	TCH; 15	TCH -	USR -	USR -	GER; 13	GER; 12	GDR; 4	GDR; 6	BEL; 7	BEL; 10	LUX -	LUX -	14th	13
1971	500cc	Maico	ITA -	ITA -	AUT; 6	AUT; 4	SWE; 12	SWE; 8	FIN; 9	FIN -	TCH; 7	TCH; 6	USR; 6	USR; 5	GDR -	GDR; 7	UK; 7	UK; 9	GER -	GER -	BEL; 7	BEL; 9	LUX; 7	LUX; 8	NED; 7	NED; 8	8th	36
1972	500cc	Maico	AUT; 2	AUT; 3	CH -	CH -	SWE; 4	SWE; 2	FRA -	FRA; 3	USR -	USR -	TCH -	TCH -	UK; 9	UK; 8	GER; 7	GER; 4	GDR; 3	GDR -	BEL -	BEL -	LUX -	LUX -			9th	33
1973	500cc	Maico	FRA; 4	FRA; 4	AUT -	AUT -	FIN -	FIN; 5	ITA; 3	ITA -	TCH; 1	TCH; 1	USA; 1	USA; 1	GER; 1	GER -	BEL; 1	BEL; 1	LUX -	LUX; 2	NED -	NED -					2nd	143
1974	500cc	Maico	AUT; 3	AUT; 3	FRA; 6	FRA; 6	ITA; 6	ITA -	DEN; 5	DEN -	TCH; 6	TCH; 3	GER; 2	GER; 3	UK -	UK; 5	USA -	USA; 9	NED -	NED; 7	BEL -	BEL -	LUX -	LUX -			6th	88
1975	250cc	Suzuki	ESP; 3	ESP; 2	AUT; 5	AUT; 2	BEL; 4	BEL; 3	TCH; 4	TCH; 2	POL -	POL; 2	YUG; 3	YUG -	GER -	GER; 4	UK -	UK; 4	FRA; 9	FRA; 4	SWE; 3	SWE -	FIN; 4	FIN -	CH -	CH; 3	3rd	130
1976	500cc	KTM	CH; 5	CH -	FRA; 4	FRA -	ITA; 8	ITA; 4	AUT -	AUT; 4	SWE -	SWE; 6	FIN -	FIN -	GER; 6	GER -	USA -	USA -	CAN -	CAN -	UK -	UK; 7	BEL; 8	BEL -	LUX -	LUX -	10th	50
1977	500cc	KTM	AUT; 4	AUT -	NED -	NED; 10	SWE; 6	SWE -	FIN; 5	FIN; 9	GER -	GER; 9	ITA -	ITA -	USA -	USA -	CAN -	CAN -	UK -	UK -	BEL -	BEL -	LUX -	LUX -	CH; 6	CH -	13th	29
1978	250cc	Sachs	ESP -	ESP -	ITA; 5	ITA -	TCH; 5	TCH -	YUG -	YUG -	AUT -	AUT; 6	GER -	GER; 7	UK -	UK -	FRA -	FRA -	USA -	USA -	SWE -	SWE -	FIN -	FIN -	USR -	USR -	21st	21
