= 1971 Trans-AMA motocross series =

The 1971 Trans-AMA motocross series was the second annual international series established by the American Motorcyclist Association as a pilot event to help establish motocross in the United States. The motocross series was an invitational based on a 500cc engine displacement formula, run on American tracks featuring the top riders from the F.I.M. world championship against the top American riders.

Suzuki factory rider Sylvain Geboers claimed the championship with three overall victories. German Maico rider, Adolf Weil scored two overall victories and claimed second place in the championship, with Swedish Husqvarna pilot Torlief Hansen taking third place. The Suzuki teammates of Joel Robert and Roger De Coster didn't join the event until the fifth race of the series, but made an impact with De Coster posting three overall victories with Robert adding one more. As a result of his being the highest placed American rider at fourteenth overall, Mark Blackwell, was crowned the American motocross national champion, clinching the title by one point over Brad Lackey.

== 1971 Trans-AMA rounds ==
Round	Date	Location	Overall Winner	Top American
1	19 September	Carlsbad Raceway	(Belgium) Sylvain Geboers	Brad Lackey
2	26 September	Boise, Idaho	(Belgium) Sylvain Geboers	Billy Clements
3	3 October	Elkhorn, Wisconsin	(West Germany) Adolf Weil	Mark Blackwell
4	10 October	New Berlin, New York	(West Germany) Adolf Weil	Tore Jonsson
5	24 October	Delta, Ohio	(Finland) Heikki Mikkola	Tore Jonsson
6	31 October	Orlando, Florida	(Belgium) Sylvain Geboers	John DeSoto
7	7 November	St. Peters, Missouri	(Finland) Heikki Mikkola	Brad Lackey
8	14 November	Tulsa, Oklahoma	(Belgium) Roger De Coster	Brad Lackey
9	21 November	Puyallup, Washington	(Belgium) Joël Robert	Mark Blackwell
10	28 November	Livermore, California	(Belgium) Roger De Coster	Mark Blackwell
11	3 December	Irvine, California	(Belgium) Roger De Coster	Mark Blackwell

== 1971 Trans-AMA final standings ==
Pos	Rider	Machine	1	2	3	4	5	6	7	8	9	10	11	Pts
1	(Belgium) Sylvain Geboers	Suzuki	1	1	2	3	3	1	3	4	3	5	3	3,066
2	(West Germany) Adolf Weil	Maico			1	1	6	5	4	5	4	3	4	2,331
3	(Sweden) Torleif Hansen	Husqvarna	2	3	3	2	2		5	3				2,052
4	(Belgium) Roger De Coster	Suzuki					4			1	2	1	1	1,865
5	(Belgium) Joël Robert	Suzuki					9		2	2	1	4	2	1,730
6	(Finland) Heikki Mikkola	Husqvarna				5	1	2	1					1,680
7	(West Germany) Willy Bauer	Maico			7		10	7	6	8	7	6		1,276
8	(Belgium) Gaston Rahier	ČZ		2	5	4		9	8		10	8	10	1,112
9	(Netherlands) Pierre Karsmakers	Husqvarna			6		8	3	7	6	6	7		1,110
10	(United Kingdom) Dave Bickers	ČZ	3	5		6	7					10	5	1,076
11	(United Kingdom) John Banks	ČZ	5	4	9			4	10					971
12	(United Kingdom) Andy Roberton	Husqvarna						8	9	10	5	2	6	810
13	(Czech Republic) Vlastimil Válek	ČZ	7	6		8		6						709
14	(United States) Mark Blackwell	Husqvarna			4						8		8	604
15	(United States) Brad Lackey	ČZ	4	8						9				603
16	(United States) Gary Jones	Yamaha	6	10									9	439
17	(United States) John DeSoto	Suzuki	9	9				10			9			425
18	(United Kingdom) Chris Horsefield	ČZ								7		9		416
19	(Sweden) Uno Palm	Husqvarna					5							324
20	(United States) Peter Lamppu	Montesa			10	10								309
-	(United States) Tore Jonsson	Maico	8			7								-
-	(United States) Billy Clements	Husqvarna		7	8									-
-	(United Kingdom) Vic Eastwood	AJS											7	-
-	(United States) Barry Higgins	Maico				9								-
-	(United States) Bryan Kenney	Husqvarna	10											-

== See also ==
- List of Trans-AMA motocross champions
- 1971 FIM Motocross World Championship
- 1971 Inter-AMA motocross series
