= Geboers =

Geboers is a surname. Notable people with the surname include:

- Eric Geboers (1962–2018), Belgian motocross racer and racing driver
- Sylvain Geboers (born 1945), Belgian motocross racer and current motocross team manager
