= Arne Kring =

- Nationality: Swedish
- Born: November 17, 1942 (age 83) Knåda, Sweden

Motocross career
- Years active: 1963 - 1975
- Teams: Husqvarna
- Wins: 7

Arne Kring (born November 17, 1942) is a Swedish former professional motocross racer. He was a top contender in the F.I.M. 500cc Motocross World Championship from 1963 to 1975.

== Motocross career ==
Kring was born in the town of Knåda in the province of Hälsingland. Like many Swedes of his time, Kring rode Husqvarna motorcycles. Although he raced motocross professionally, his true profession was as a bicycle shop owner. At the age of 20, he entered the 1963 250cc Swedish motocross Grand Prix and scored an impressive second place finish behind the defending world champion, Torsten Hallman. After placing fourth in the 1967 250cc Swedish motocross Grand Prix, the Husqvarna factory offered Kring a motorcycle to compete with in the world championships alongside other Swedish racers such as Torsten Hallman, Åke Jonsson, Håkan Andersson and Bengt Åberg. Kring and Åberg lived only a few kilometers apart in Hälsingland and became good friends due to their shared passion for motorcycles.

In 1967, Kring joined his Husqvarna teammates, Torsten Hallman and Åke Jonsson, along with ČZ factory teammates Joël Robert, Roger De Coster and Dave Bickers in a series of exhibition races in the United States that had been organized by Edison Dye, the American importer for Husqvarna motorcycles. The exhibition races served as a means to introduce the sport of motocross to an American audience, and eventually led to the formation of the Inter-AM and Trans-AMA motocross series that helped to popularize the sport of motocross in the United States.

Kring moved up to the premier 500cc class in 1969 riding Husqvarna's best machinery. He won his first world championship race at the 500cc Swedish Grand Prix and, followed with another victory one week later at the Dutch Grand Prix to give him the early lead in the 1969 500cc world championships. However, he failed to win again until the final race of the year at the East German Grand Prix and finished the season ranked fourth in the world as his Husqvarna teammate, Bengt Åberg won the world championship. After the World Championship season had ended, Kring returned to the United States and won the 1969 Inter-AM Series.

Kring was having the most successful season of his career in 1970 when, he led in the 500cc world championship points standings with four overall victories in the first nine rounds before he broke his back while competing in a non-championship race. His injury ended his season however, he had accumulated enough points to claim second place in the world championship behind teammate Bengt Åberg. He competed in his final World Championship race at the 1975 500cc Dutch Grand Prix at the age of 32.

== Career overview ==
Kring won ten individual heat races and seven Grand Prix victories during his world championship racing career. Although he never won a World Championship, he won the 1974 500cc Swedish Motocross Championship. Kring was a member of four Swedish Motocross des Nations teams (1969, 1970, 1974, 1975) and five Trophée des Nations teams (1969, 1970, 1972-1974). He helped Sweden win the 1970 and 1974 Motocross des Nations events and, he was also the top individual points scorer at the 1969 Trophée des Nations.

== Motocross Grand Prix Results ==
Points system from 1952 to 1968:

| Position | 1st | 2nd | 3rd | 4th | 5th | 6th |
|---|---|---|---|---|---|---|
| Points | 8 | 6 | 4 | 3 | 2 | 1 |

Points system from 1969 to 1980:

| Position | 1 | 2 | 3 | 4 | 5 | 6 | 7 | 8 | 9 | 10 |
|---|---|---|---|---|---|---|---|---|---|---|
| Points | 15 | 12 | 10 | 8 | 6 | 5 | 4 | 3 | 2 | 1 |

| Year | Class | Team | 1 | | 2 | | 3 | | 4 | | 5 | | 6 | | 7 | | 8 | | 9 | | 10 | | 11 | | 12 | | 13 | | 14 | | Pos | Pts |
| Year | Class | Team | R1 | R2 | R1 | R2 | R1 | R2 | R1 | R2 | R1 | R2 | R1 | R2 | R1 | R2 | R1 | R2 | R1 | R2 | R1 | R2 | R1 | R2 | R1 | R2 | R1 | R2 | R1 | R2 | Pos | Pts |
|---|---|---|---|---|---|---|---|---|---|---|---|---|---|---|---|---|---|---|---|---|---|---|---|---|---|---|---|---|---|---|---|---|
| 1963 | 250cc | Husqvarna | ESP - | ESP - | ITA - | ITA - | FRA - | FRA - | CH - | CH - | GER - | GER - | LUX - | LUX - | NED - | NED - | UK - | UK - | SWE; 2 | SWE; 4 | FIN - | FIN - | USR - | USR - | POL - | POL - | CZE - | CZE - | GDR - | GDR - | 9th | 6 |
| 1967 | 250cc | Husqvarna | ESP - | ESP - | CH - | CH - | FRA - | FRA - | BEL - | BEL - | GER - | GER - | NED - | NED - | ITA - | ITA - | UK - | UK - | SWE; 5 | SWE; 5 | FIN - | FIN - | USR - | USR - | POL - | POL - | | | | | 12th | 3 |
| 1969 | 500cc | Husqvarna | AUT - | AUT - | SWE; 1 | SWE; 1 | NED; 1 | NED; 2 | ITA; 3 | ITA - | CZE; 4 | CZE; 3 | USR - | USR - | GER; 2 | GER; 6 | BEL - | BEL - | LUX - | LUX - | FRA; 8 | FRA; 8 | CH - | CH - | GDR; 2 | GDR; 2 | | | | | 4th | 66 |
| 1970 | 500cc | Husqvarna | CH; 3 | CH - | AUT; 3 | AUT; 3 | NED; 3 | NED; 1 | FRA; 1 | FRA; 1 | FIN; 1 | FIN; 1 | SWE - | SWE; 2 | CZE; 2 | CZE; 1 | USR - | USR - | GER; 5 | GER; 3 | GDR - | GDR - | BEL - | BEL - | LUX - | LUX - | | | | | 2nd | 80 |
| 1971 | 500cc | Husqvarna | ITA; 8 | ITA; 7 | AUT; 10 | AUT; 7 | SWE; 6 | SWE; 7 | FIN - | FIN - | CZE - | CZE - | USR - | USR - | GDR - | GDR - | UK - | UK - | GER - | GER - | BEL - | BEL - | LUX - | LUX - | NED - | NED - | | | | | 14th | 14 |
| 1972 | 250cc | Husqvarna | ESP - | ESP - | FRA - | FRA - | NED; 4 | NED - | CZE; 7 | CZE; 2 | YUG - | YUG; 4 | GER; 7 | GER - | POL - | POL - | USR; 10 | USR - | FIN; 2 | FIN; 9 | SWE; 1 | SWE; 2 | UK - | UK; 11 | CH; 4 | CH; 3 | | | | | 8th | 42 |
| 1973 | 500cc | Husqvarna | FRA - | FRA; 10 | AUT - | AUT - | FIN - | FIN - | ITA - | ITA - | CZE - | CZE; 10 | USA - | USA - | GER - | GER - | BEL - | BEL - | LUX - | LUX - | NED; 9 | NED - | | | | | | | | | 31st | 4 |
| 1974 | 500cc | Husqvarna | AUT; 7 | AUT; 7 | FRA; 3 | FRA; 8 | ITA - | ITA - | DEN; 7 | DEN; 3 | CZE - | CZE - | GER; 7 | GER - | UK; 4 | UK; 4 | USA - | USA - | NED; 7 | NED; 3 | BEL; 4 | BEL; 5 | LUX - | LUX; 7 | | | | | | | 8th | 80 |
| 1975 | 500cc | Husqvarna | CH; 7 | CH; 5 | ITA - | ITA - | FIN; 7 | FIN; 5 | USR - | USR; 8 | FRA - | FRA - | USA - | USA - | CAN - | CAN - | UK; 4 | UK; 6 | GER - | GER; 7 | NED; 4 | NED - | BEL - | BEL - | LUX - | LUX - | | | | | 9th | 48 |
