= Torsten Hallman =

Swedish motorcycle racer

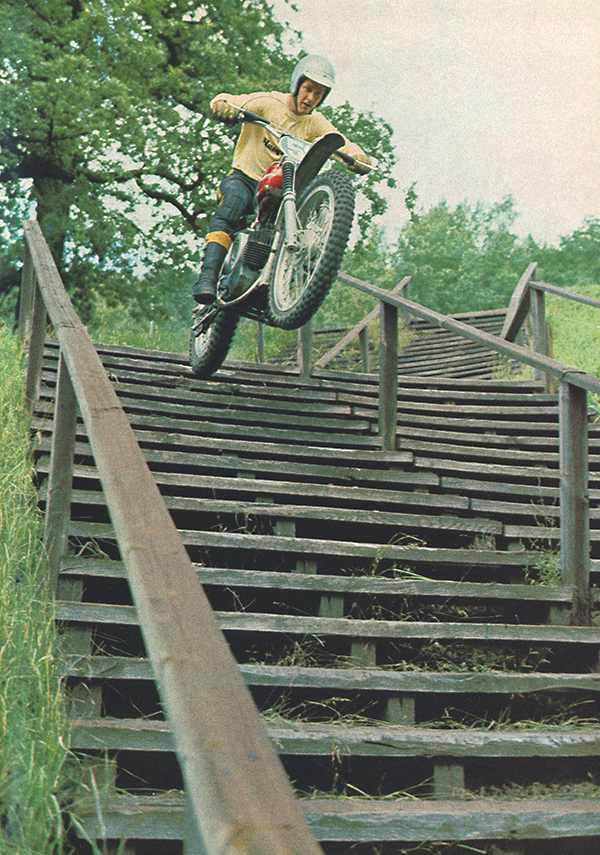
- Torsten Hallman, 1967
- Nationality: Swedish
- Born: 17 October 1939 (age 87) Uppsala, Sweden

Motocross career
- Years active: 1959 - 1971
- Teams: Husqvarna, Yamaha
- Championships: 250cc - 1962, 1963, 1966, 1967
- Wins: 37

Torsten Hallman (born 17 October 1939) is a Swedish former professional motocross racer and business entrepreneur. He competed in the Motocross World Championships from 1959 to 1971, most prominently as a member of the Husqvarna factory racing team where he won four 250cc Motocross World Championships.

Hallman was part of a contingent of Swedish motorcyclists including; Bill Nilsson, Rolf Tibblin and Sten Lundin who dominated the sport of motocross in the early 1960s. His battles with Belgium's Joël Robert were considered some of the best in the history of the championships. Between 1964 and 1968, the pair finished first or second to one another in the world championship four times.

After his racing career, Hallman established a successful off-road racing apparel company. Hallman played an integral role in the introduction of the sport of motocross in the United States. He was recognized for his influential role in the development of American motocross in 2000 when, he was inducted into the AMA Motorcycle Hall of Fame. In 2012, he was named an FIM Legend for his motorcycling achievements.

== Motorcycling career ==
Hallman was born in Viksta, just outside of Uppsala, Sweden. At the age of 13, he learned to ride a motorcycle on his father's farm. His father was an amateur motorcycle racer who had constructed a motocross track on his farm property, which allowed Hallman to practice riding on rough, off-road terrain. Hallman’s first motorcycle was a 100cc DKW, which he rode in all types of weather including rain and snow. After the DKW was worn down from constant riding, he next acquired a 175cc Royal Enfield motorcycle.

Hallman entered his first race at the age of 17 as a member of the Uppsala Motorcycle Club (UMCK). He won the Junior Class at the 1957 Nyman Cup and scored fifth overall. His sudden success brought him to the attention of Bror Jauren, manager of Husqvarna’s racing team, who offered Hallman a motorcycle and support for his racing competitions. He then won the 1958 200cc Swedish Enduro National Championship.

Hallman won the 175cc Swedish Enduro National Championship in 1959, and entered into his first 250cc European motocross championship race at the 250cc Dutch Grand Prix at Lichtenvoorde, where he scored an impressive third place in the first heat race behind race winner Rolf Tibblin and second-placed Stig Rickardsson. He placed seventh in the second heat race. At the 1959 250cc Swedish Grand Prix, he followed race winner Tibblin with two second place results. Tibblin went on to win the 1959 250cc European motocross championship for Husqvarna. Hallman also finished second to Gunnar Johansson at the 1959 Novemberkåsan Enduro.

=== Grand Prix racing ===
Hallman possessed a smooth, efficient riding style, absorbing jumps with his legs so that his motorcycle flew at half the height of his competitors, which allowed the rear tire to begin applying power to the ground sooner. Five-time World Champion, Roger De Coster, cited Hallman's riding style as having influenced his own riding habits.

His success on the race track earned Hallman full sponsorship from the Husqvarna racing team in the 1960 250cc European Motocross Championship. He won his first European Championship heat race at the season-opening 250cc Spanish Grand Prix ahead of Dave Bickers (Greeves) and Jaromír Čížek (Jawa). He won another heat race in East Germany ahead of Stig Rickardsson (Husqvarna) and Arthur Lampkin (BSA), but then broke his collarbone at 1960 250cc British Grand Prix which forced him to miss the remainder of the season. Dave Bickers claimed the championship for the Greeves factory while Hallman was ranked seventh in the 250cc European Championship final classification.

Hallman began the 1961 season with a string of top five results before winning his first overall victory at the 1961 250cc Finnish Grand Prix. He improved to fourth in the 1961 250cc European Motocross Championship, with Bickers repeating as champion. Hallman was the top points scorer at 1961 Trophée des Nations, helping the Swedish team place second behind the British team.

The Husqvarna company had been making motorcycles since 1903, but in the early 1960s, the company almost stopped motorcycle production as demand had decreased. Husqvarna had informed Hallman that their motorcycle development would stop and that he should seek employment elsewhere. After he had arranged a test ride with the Greeves factory, he was notified that the Husqvarna management had reluctantly agreed to repurpose some of the funding for their chainsaw division, and instead invest it into the development of a new 250cc motorcycle with a four-speed, two-stroke engine. Husqvarna was one of the first motorcycle manufacturers to adopt two-stroke engine technology for motocross racing.

During the 1950s, motocross competitors used motorcycles with heavy, pre-war, four-stroke engines, however the advances in two-stroke technology after the Second World War made apparent the importance of lightness and agility in motocross racing. Hallman was asked to stay on and help development of the new motorcycle while competing in the World Championships. Believing that the future of motocross was with the lightweight two-stroke engines, he chose to remain in the 250cc class rather than compete in the more prestigious 500cc class. He also believed it was pointless to compete with Rolf Tibblin in 500 class.

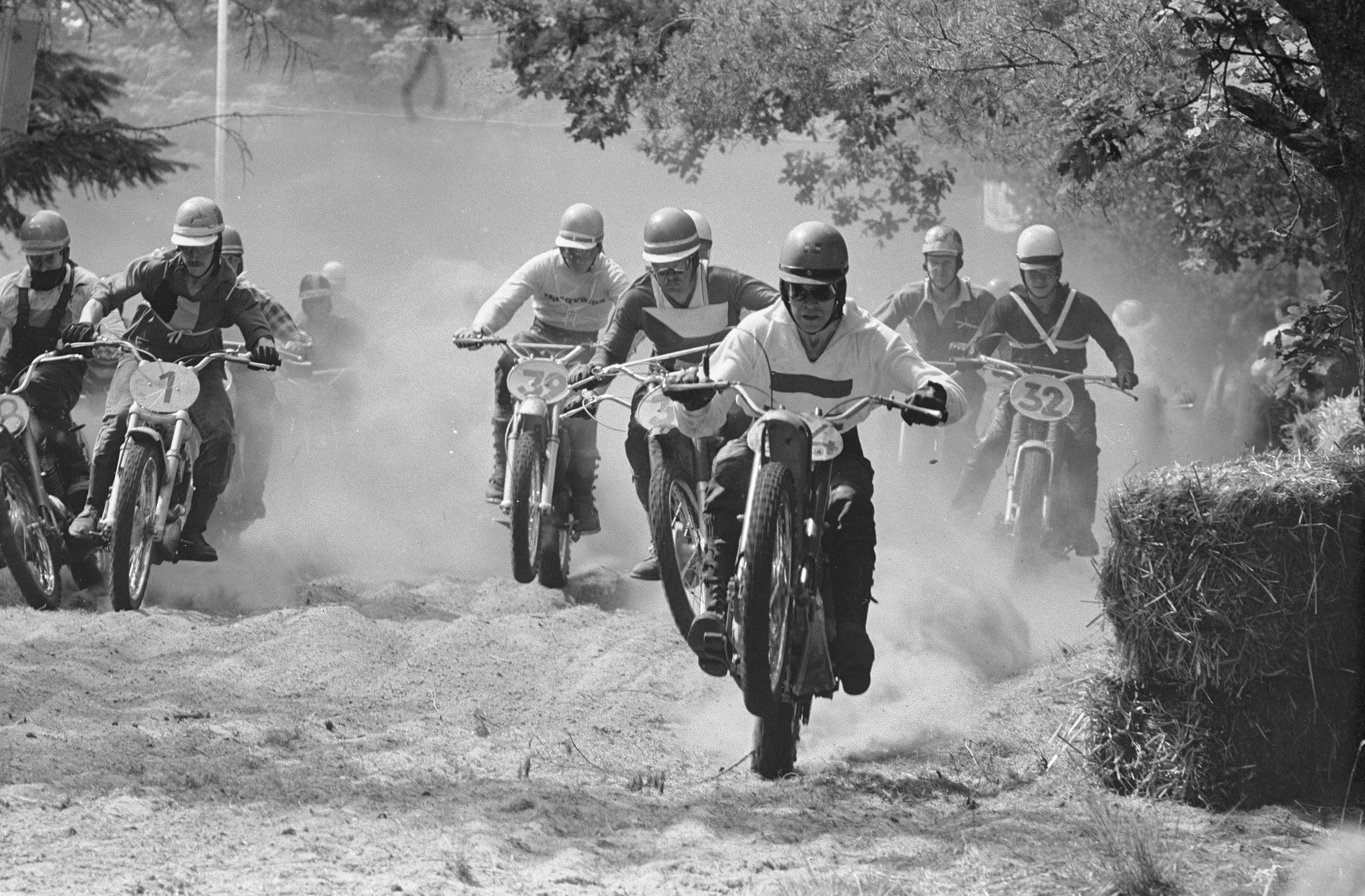
Hallman (39) competing in the 250cc Dutch Grand Prix on 9 June 1963.

The FIM upgraded the European Motocross Championship to World Championship status for the 1962 season. The Greeves factory chose not to compete in the new championship, keeping two-time European motocross champion, Dave Bickers, at home to compete in the British championship. Given a second chance by the Husqvarna factory, Hallman rode his Husqvarna motorcycle to victory, winning five of the last six Grand Prix races to overtake BSA teammates Jeff Smith and Arthur Lampkin and claim his first world title.

Hallman successfully defended his crown in 1963, dominating the 1963 250cc World Championship by winning eight of the fourteen rounds to take the title over three ČZ factory team riders. At the 1963 Trophée des Nations, Hallman won both heat races to help the Swedish team defeat the British and Czechoslovak teams.

22-year-old newcomer, Åke Jonsson, who had defeated Hallman in the 1964 250cc Swedish Motocross Championship, would join Hallman on the Husqvarna factory racing team to help with development of the new race bike, and to help fend off the threat from the ČZ factory racing team in the 1964 250cc World Championship.

=== Rivalry with Robert ===
Prior to the 1964 season, Hallman had been offered a contract to race for the ČZ factory racing team. ČZ had developed a new twin-port, two-stroke engine that considerably increased its horsepower. However, Hallman rejected their offer preferring to remain with the Husqvarna team. After Hallman's rejection, the ČZ factory gave the motorcycle they had intended for Hallman to 20-year-old privateer, Joël Robert. Robert took full advantage of the ČZ factory support to win 9 of the 14 Grand Prix races to claim the world championship ahead of second-placed Hallman. Hallman was once again the top scoring rider at the 1964 Trophée des Nations, as the Swedish team took top honors for the second consecutive year.

In 1965, Hallman was completing his senior year in college and the heavy workload meant he had to reduce his racing schedule, yet he still managed a fourth place in the 1965 250cc World Championship. Russian ČZ rider Victor Arbekov won five Grand Prix races to claim the world championship ahead of the defending champion Joël Robert.

The following three seasons were marked by the intense rivalry between Hallman and his great rival, Joël Robert. Husqvarna produced a new race bike for 1966 with a new, rigid frame that placed the engine lower so that handling was improved. The new front forks were also developed and produced in-house. Defending champion Arbekov began the 1966 season with a victory at the Spanish Grand Prix, however he was injured in a serious crash at the second round in France and did not return to form until the 14th round. Despite Arbekov's absence, Hallman still had to fend off ČZ riders Robert and Petr Dobry. Hallman and Robert traded wins back and forth in a season-long battle for the 1966 250cc Motocross World Championship that wasn't decided until the final race when Hallman finally prevailed over his rival.

Hallman was once again a member of the victorious Swedish team at the 1966 Trophée des Nations, helping the Swedish team take top honors for the third time in four years (the 1965 Trophée des Nations event was canceled due to bad weather). During his free time, Hallman also participated in Swedish auto rally racing competitions, driving a Saab 96 with his older brother, Hans, serving as his co-driver.

=== Spreading motocross to America ===
At the end of the 1966 World Championship, the American importer for Husqvarna motorcycles, Edison Dye, invited Hallman to participate in exhibition races up and down the west coast of the United States as a means to introduce the sport of motocross to an American audience. Hallman impressed American spectators who had never witnessed the kind of acrobatic off-road riding performed by Hallman.

Hallman's first trip to the United States was a success and is credited with igniting the growth of motocross in North America. Motorcycle Hall of Fame member, Dick Mann, who rode against Hallman in 1966, declared after Hallman's visit to the United States, “Nothing affected the sport so much in my lifetime as the Europeans coming to America!”

=== Hallman vs Robert ===
Husqvarna doubled its racing budget over the previous year, with riders Håkan Andersson, Olle Pettersson and Staffan Eneqvist joining Hallman on the 250cc team, while Jonsson moved up to the 500cc class. Hallman and Robert were once again the main protagonists in the battle for the 1967 250cc motocross World Championship. As with the previous year, the two rivals traded victories throughout the season. After eight of twelve rounds, Robert had won four Grand Prix races to Hallman's three however, Robert failed to finish in the three of the final four rounds, allowing Hallman to overtake him with a victory at the penultimate round in Russia and claim his fourth world championship by a slim two point margin. The two rivals dominated the championship with five Grand Prix victories apiece.

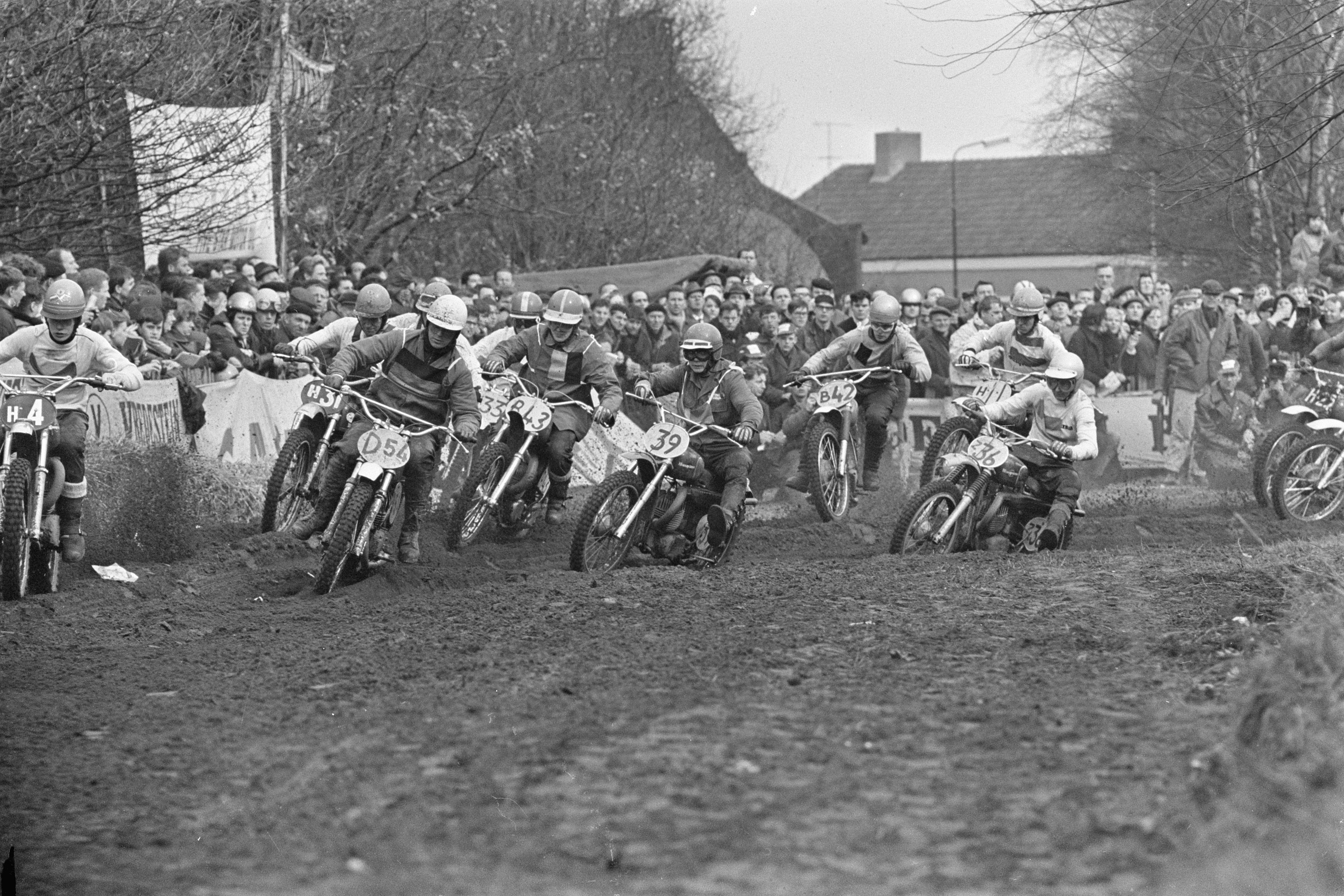
Hallman (36) during a pre-season invitational race in Sint Anthonis, Holland on 19 March 1967.

Hallman continued his success at the Trophée des Nations event in 1967, when he was once again the top scoring rider helping the Swedish team take top honors for their fourth victory in five years at the event. He also helped the Swedish team score a second place in 1967 500cc Motocross des Nations behind Great Britain.

The two competitors continued their rivalry into the 1968 season. The ČZ factory switched Dave Bickers from the 500cc class to the 250cc class and hired 23-year-old Sylvain Geboers to support Robert while Husqvarna retained Håkan Andersson in support of Hallman. Olle Pettersson was hired from Husqvarna by the Suzuki factory to help develop their new motocross bike. After Robert won three consecutive Grand Prix races in France, Holland and West Germany to take the early points lead, Hallman then won three races in Russia, Yugoslavia and Sweden to tie Robert for the championship points lead as they went into the final round in Austria.

Hallman took the lead in the first heat race and had built a 23 second lead over Robert, when his motorcycle's rear tire was punctured allowing Robert to pass Hallman for the victory. As the second race began, Hallman once again took the lead until his engine began to overheat and lose power, allowing Robert to catch up and pass him for the race victory. Robert claimed the 1968 250cc World Championship by two points, denying Hallman's bid for a fifth world championship.

Hallman was a member of a victorious Swedish team at the 1968 Trophée des Nations event for the fifth and final time in his career. He also helped the Swedish team score a second place in 1969 500cc Motocross des Nations behind Belgium. After he was slowed by a back injury, his results suffered and he was released by the Husqvarna factory team after the 1969 season.

=== Move to Yamaha ===
In 1971, Hallman was hired by the Yamaha factory to help them develop the Yamaha YZ250 motocross bike. Hallman scored Yamaha's first motocross world championship points with a 7th place at the 1971 250cc Dutch Grand Prix. At the age of 32, he retired from competition at the end of the 1971 season, but continued to work on motorcycle development for Yamaha.

Hallman was instrumental in Yamaha's decision to purchase the patent for an innovative single shock absorber rear suspension designed by Lucien Tilkens, a professor at the Liege Engineering College in Belgium. When Tilkens had his new suspension system rejected by the Suzuki factory, he approached Hallman who then tested a motorcycle fitted with the new suspension. Having seen the benefits of the suspension for himself, Hallman convinced Yamaha team manager, Mr. Kuratomo, that the new invention was worth developing. The suspension design which became known by the trade name Monoshock, helped Håkan Andersson win the 1973 250cc motocross world championship for Yamaha and would go on to revolutionize the sport.

In 1977 when four-stroke racing machines were rare, Hallman collaborated with former world champions Bengt Åberg and Sten Lundin in developing a highly modified four-stroke Yamaha XT500, which Åberg raced in the 1977 FIM Motocross World Championship season. Åberg rode the bike to a victory in the first moto of the 1977 500cc Luxembourg Grand Prix and ended the season ranked 9th in the final world championship standings.

== Later life ==
After his racing career, Hallman began to sell motocross pants and gloves at the races to help supplement his income. Innovative Hallman racing products were available in the mid-1970s via catalogue, and were very popular throughout the United States. This eventually led to the formation of THOR Motocross (Torsten Hallman Original Racewear). THOR grew to become one of the leading off-road racing apparel companies in the world. Hallman eventually sold the company to the LeMans Corporation in the late 1990s.

Hallman won 68 individual heat races and 37 Grand Prix victories during his world championship racing career. He won four 250cc motocross world titles (1962, 1963, 1966, 1967} and four 250cc Swedish national motocross championships (1961, 1962, 1963, 1965). He was a member of five victorious Swedish teams at the Trophée des Nations (1963, 1964, 1966, 1967, 1968), and he was the top individual points scorer at four Trophée des Nations events, (1961, 1963, 1964, 1967).

In 2000, Hallman was inducted into the AMA Motorcycle Hall of Fame along with Joël Robert. Also in 2000, he was named the recipient of the Edison Dye Motocross Lifetime Achievement Award given to those individuals who made the largest impact on the growth of motocross in America.

== Motocross Grand Prix results ==
Points system from 1952 to 1968:

Position	1st	2nd	3rd	4th	5th	6th
Points	8	6	4	3	2	1

Points system from 1969 to 1980:

Position	1	2	3	4	5	6	7	8	9	10
Points	15	12	10	8	6	5	4	3	2	1

Denotes European motocross championship only.

Year	Class	Team	1		2		3		4		5		6		7		8		9		10		11		12		13		14		15		Pos	Pts
Year	Class	Team	R1	R2	R1	R2	R1	R2	R1	R2	R1	R2	R1	R2	R1	R2	R1	R2	R1	R2	R1	R2	R1	R2	R1	R2	R1	R2	R1	R2	R1	R2	Pos	Pts
1959	250cc	Husqvarna	AUT -	AUT -	CH -	CH -	BEL -	BEL -	GDR -	GDR -	TCH -	TCH -	POL -	POL -	GER -	GER -	ITA -	ITA -	FRA -	FRA -	NED; 3	NED; 7	UK -	UK -	LUX -	LUX -	SWE; 2	SWE; 2					9th	9
1960	250cc	Husqvarna	CH; 1	CH -	BEL; 10	BEL -	FRA; 2	FRA; 4	TCH -	TCH -	POL -	POL -	ITA; 3	ITA; 2	GDR; 3	GDR; 1	FIN; 4	FIN; 2	LUX; 3	LUX; 3	UK -	UK -	SWE -	SWE -	GER -	GER -							7th	24
1961	250cc	Husqvarna	BEL; 6	BEL; 4	FRA; 2	FRA; 3	NED; 3	NED; 3	TCH -	TCH; 4	POL -	POL -	LUX; 4	LUX; 2	FIN; 2	FIN; 3	ITA -	ITA -	GER; 5	GER; 1	UK; 3	UK; 4	CH; 2	CH; 6	SWE; 3	SWE -	GDR -	GDR -					4th	33
1962	250cc	Husqvarna	ESP -	ESP -	CH; 3	CH; 5	BEL; 1	BEL; 3	FRA; 1	FRA; 2	TCH; 2	TCH -	POL -	POL -	NED -	NED -	LUX; 1	LUX; 1	FIN; 7	FIN; 9	USR; 1	USR; 1	GER; 1	GER; 1	ITA; 1	ITA; 1	UK; 2	UK; 2	SWE; 1	SWE; 1	GDR; 1	GDR; 1	1st	56
1963	250cc	Husqvarna	ESP; 2	ESP; 1	ITA; 1	ITA; 1	FRA; 1	FRA; 1	CH; 1	CH; 1	GER; 1	GER; 1	LUX; 1	LUX; 1	NED; 7	NED; 1	UK; 1	UK; 1	SWE; 1	SWE; 1	FIN; 1	FIN; 1	USR -	USR; 1	POL -	POL -	TCH; 2	TCH; 2	GDR -	GDR -			1st	56
1964	250cc	Husqvarna	ESP; 1	ESP; 1	BEL; 3	BEL; 2	CH; 10	CH; 5	TCH; 9	TCH; 2	GER; 2	GER; 4	LUX; 3	LUX; 5	ITA; 4	ITA; 1	UK; 3	UK -	SWE; 2	SWE; 2	FIN; 4	FIN; 4	USR -	USR -	POL; 2	POL; 1	GDR -	GDR -	FRA; 2	FRA; 1			2nd	50
1965	250cc	Husqvarna	ESP; 1	ESP; 8	ITA -	ITA -	FRA; 5	FRA; 6	BEL; 4	BEL; 2	TCH; 3	TCH; 3	GER -	GER -	NED -	NED -	LUX; 9	LUX; 7	POL -	POL -	USR -	USR -	GDR -	GDR -	UK -	UK -	SWE; 2	SWE; 1	FIN; 1	FIN; 1	AUT -	AUT -	4th	35
1966	250cc	Husqvarna	ESP; 3	ESP; 2	FRA; 2	FRA; 1	BEL; 1	BEL; 3	CH; 3	CH; 3	TCH; 2	TCH; 2	GER; 3	GER; 1	NED; 1	NED -	LUX -	LUX -	ITA; 1	ITA; 1	POL; 2	POL; 2	GDR; 4	GDR; 8	SWE; 2	SWE; 2	FIN; 3	FIN; 3	USR -	USR -	AUT; 2	AUT; 4	1st	58
1967	250cc	Husqvarna	ESP -	ESP; 2	CH; 1	CH; 2	FRA; 2	FRA; 2	BEL; 3	BEL; 3	GER; 2	GER; 1	NED; 1	NED -	ITA; 2	ITA; 1	UK -	UK; 3	SWE; 1	SWE; 1	FIN; 1	FIN; 2	USR; 1	USR; 1	POL -	POL -							1st	52
1968	250cc	Husqvarna	ESP; 2	ESP; 1	BEL -	BEL -	TCH -	TCH -	FRA; 2	FRA -	NED; 8	NED; 3	GER; 3	GER; 1	LUX; 1	LUX; 2	POL; 7	POL; 1	USR; 2	USR; 1	YUG; 1	YUG; 1	FIN; 3	FIN -	SWE; 4	SWE; 2	UK; 2	UK; 2	AUT; 2	AUT -			2nd	52
1969	250cc	Husqvarna	ESP; 4	ESP; 7	CH; 8	CH; 6	YUG; 5	YUG; 2	TCH -	TCH -	POL; 2	POL; 5	GER -	GER -	NED -	NED -	FRA -	FRA -	UK -	UK -	SWE; 4	SWE -	FIN -	FIN -	USR -	USR -							6th	32
1970	250cc	Husqvarna	ESP; 6	ESP; 2	FRA; 5	FRA -	BEL -	BEL -	YUG; 10	YUG -	ITA -	ITA; 9	USR -	USR -	POL -	POL -	UK; 9	UK; 5	FIN -	FIN -	GDR -	GDR -	CH; 7	CH -	AUT -	AUT -							11th	17
1971	250cc	Yamaha	ESP -	ESP -	CH -	CH -	POL -	POL -	GER -	GER -	YUG -	YUG -	ITA -	ITA -	NED; 8	NED; 10	GDR -	GDR -	FIN -	FIN -	SWE -	SWE -	UK -	UK -	AUT -	AUT -							22nd	4
