= Bengt Åberg =

Swedish professional motocross racer (1944–2021)

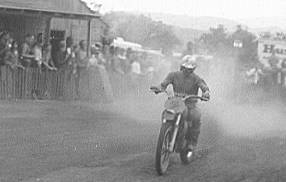
- Åberg on his Husky at the 1969 Westlake GP in California. Åberg won the race.
- Nationality: Swedish
- Born: 26 June 1944 Bollnäs, Hälsingland, Sweden
- Died: 6 March 2021 (aged 76) Sörbo, Hälsingland, Sweden

Motocross career
- Years active: 1966–1979
- Teams: Husqvarna, Bultaco, Yamaha
- Championships: 500cc - 1969, 1970
- Wins: 11

Bengt Edvin Åberg (26 June 1944 – 6 March 2021) was a Swedish professional motocross racer. He competed in the Motocross World Championships from 1966 to 1979, most prominently as a member of the Husqvarna factory racing team where he won two FIM 500cc Motocross World Championships. Åberg was part of a contingent of Swedish motorcyclists including; Bill Nilsson, Sten Lundin, Rolf Tibblin and Torsten Hallman who dominated the sport of motocross in the 1950s and 1960s.

== Biography ==
=== Early racing career ===
Åberg was born the son of a farmer in Sörbo, Hälsingland, Sweden on 26 June 1944. He began riding motorcycles at the age of 15 and became a member of the Bollnäs Motorklubb. At the age of 21 he competed in his first Motocross World Championship event at the 1966 500cc Swiss Grand Prix as a privateer aboard a Triumph motorcycle.

Åberg first came to prominence at the 1966 Swedish 500cc Grand Prix where he won the first heat race over a strong field of competitors including former 250cc European Champion, Dave Bickers (ČZ) and former 500cc World Champion, Rolf Tibblin (ČZ). In the second heat race, he finished in third place behind the defending 500cc World Champion, Jeff Smith (BSA) and Jan Johansson (Lindström).

=== Husqvarna factory racing team ===
Åberg's racing success earned him support from the Husqvarna factory along with other Swedish racers such as Torsten Hallman, Åke Jonsson, Arne Kring and Håkan Andersson. Kring and Åberg lived only a few kilometers apart in Hälsingland and became good friends due to their shared passion for motorcycles. Åberg became the top 500cc rider for the Husqvarna team in the 1967 season. Although he had a natural riding talent that earned him the admiration of his fellow competitors, he was still prone to crashing too often. His 360cc Husqvarna motorcycle was also underpowered in comparison to his competition.

Despite his disadvantages, Åberg was able to show his promise at the 1967 500cc French Grand Prix. He finished the first heat race in third place behind the reigning World Champion, Paul Friedrichs (ČZ) and Vlastimil Válek (ČZ), then was leading the second heat race ahead of Friedrichs when he landed off a jump awkwardly, injuring his foot and forcing him to abandon the race. Åberg's 1967 season came to an end when he broke his collarbone during practice for the 500cc Belgian Grand Prix.

Husqvarna introduced a new 420cc motorcycle for the 1968 season and Åberg used the new machine to win the first overall victory of his career at the season opening 500cc Austrian Grand Prix. He won his second Grand Prix in Belgium at the storied racetrack in the forests surrounding the picturesque hilltop Citadel of Namur. First held in 1947, the Namur Grand Prix was revered by motocross enthusiasts in the same manner that auto racing enthusiasts considered the Monaco Grand Prix to be the crown jewel of the Formula One season. Åberg finished the season ranked fourth as Friedrichs won his third consecutive 500cc Motocross World Championship.

At the Trophée des Nations event held on September 1, 1968, Åberg's third place finish helped lead the Swedish team to victory ahead of a strong Belgian team led by 250cc World Champion Joël Robert (ČZ) and Roger De Coster (ČZ). After the 500cc world championships, Åberg participated in the 1968 Inter-AM series in the United States. The Inter-AM was an international series established as a pilot event to help establish motocross in the United States by Edison Dye, the American importer for Husqvarna motorcycles. Åberg defeated Joël Robert (ČZ) in the 500 class at the Carlsbad Raceway round. Robert was considered to be the fastest motocross racer in the world at the time, but he was often hampered by his lackadaisical attitude towards physical fitness training as well as numerous mechanical issues he endured with his ČZ motorcycle.

=== Motocross World Champion ===
Åberg started the 1969 season with a victory at the season opening Austrian Grand Prix, but then BSA factory rider John Banks surged into the championship points lead with consecutive victories in Czechoslovakia and Russia. Banks then suffered a string of mechanical failures in the West Germany, Luxembourg, France and Switzerland, while Åberg finished on the podium in five of the last six Grand Prix races to overtake the BSA rider and clinch the World Championship with a victory at the Swiss Grand Prix. Åberg was the top individual points scorer at the 1969 Motocross des Nations event helping the Swedish team finish second to the Belgian team led by Joël Robert (ČZ) and Roger De Coster (ČZ).

Åberg's strongest competitor during the 1970 season was his friend and Husqvarna teammate, Arne Kring. He began the season with two consecutive victories in Switzerland and Austria, but then Kring surged into the championship points lead with three consecutive victories. At the sixth round in their Swedish homeland, the two competitors engaged in a fierce battle for the lead when they came off a jump and collided in mid-air forcing both riders to retire. Kring came back to win the next round in Czechoslovakia while Åberg won the West German round. However, with three rounds left in the championship Kring suffered a broken back while competing in a non-championship race forcing him to withdraw from the remaining races. Maico factory team rider Åke Jonsson had posted consistent results and took the championship points lead going into the final round, but he failed to score any points, allowing Åberg to overtake him and claim his second consecutive 500cc world championship.

At the 1970 Motocross des Nations event, he finished second to teammate Åke Jonsson in the first heat race to help the Swedish team win the event for the first time since 1962. After the 500cc world championships, Åberg returned to the United States to compete in the 1970 Inter-AM Motocross Series where he was filmed while racing at Saddleback Park in Southern California as part of the 1971 Bruce Brown motorcycle documentary film, On Any Sunday. The film's success was credited with helping to spark an explosive growth in American motorcycle sales numbers as the baby boomer generation came of age.

=== Japanese dominance ===
In the 1971 season, the Suzuki factory team won the premier 500cc class in their first attempt with rider Roger De Coster winning five of the 12 Grand Prix events to become the first Japanese manufacturer to win the 500cc World Championship. Åberg won the 1971 East German Grand Prix but dropped to sixth place in the season final standings. He helped the Swedish team take their second consecutive victory at the 1971 Motocross des Nations held in Vannes, France.

By the 1972 season, Suzuki had begun to open a technological gap over the European manufacturers who lacked the financial resources to compete on an equal level. With no weight limit rules imposed by the FIM, the Suzuki factory was able to develop extremely lightweight motorcycles for De Coster who led the 500cc World Championship from start to finish, winning six of twelve Grand Prix races to clinch the title with two races remaining on the schedule. Åberg finished the season in seventh place. Later that year, he placed seventh in the 1972 Trans-AMA motocross series in the United States.

=== Move to Bultaco team ===
After finishing 12th in the 1973 500cc World Championship, Åberg rode for the Bultaco factory in the 500cc class from 1974 to 1976. His best result with the Bultaco team was a victory over De Coster (Suzuki) in the second heat race of the 1974 500cc Luxembourg Grand Prix. Åberg was the top individual points scorer at the 1974 Motocross des Nations event, winning both motos to lead the Swedish team to victory. 1974 would mark the last year that Sweden was the Motocross des Nations Champion. He participated in the 1974 Trans-AMA motocross series, winning a heat race in Livermore, California ahead of American riders, Jimmy Weinert (Kawasaki) and Rex Staten (Honda).

=== Yamaha four-stroke project ===
In the 1977 500cc World Championship, at a time when four stroke racing machines were rare, Åberg competed on a highly modified four stroke Yamaha XT500 built in collaboration with former world champions Torsten Hallman and Sten Lundin. He rode the motorcycle to a victory in the first moto of the 1977 500cc Luxembourg Grand Prix ahead of Roger De Coster (Suzuki) and Heikki Mikkola (Yamaha). He ended the season ranked 9th in the final world championship standings.

== Career overview ==
Åberg retired from motocross competitions in 1979 at the age of 35 having won 17 individual heat races and 11 Grand Prix victories during his world championship racing career. He won two 500cc motocross world titles (1969-1970} and one 500cc Swedish Motocross Championship championship (1970). He was a member of three victorious Swedish teams at the Motocross des Nations in 1970, 1971, and 1974. Åberg was the top individual points scorer at the 1969 and 1974 Motocross des Nations events.

== Later life ==
In 1995, Åberg won the Swedish ice speedway national championships at the age of 51. He was a longtime member of the Bollnäs Motorklubb, serving on the board and helping design local motocross tracks.

Åberg died at the age of 76 on 6 March 2021 from complications due to diabetes.

== Motocross Grand Prix Results ==
Points system from 1952 to 1968:

Position	1st	2nd	3rd	4th	5th	6th
Points	8	6	4	3	2	1

Points system from 1969 to 1980:

Position	1	2	3	4	5	6	7	8	9	10
Points	15	12	10	8	6	5	4	3	2	1

Year	Class	Team	1		2		3		4		5		6		7		8		9		10		11		12		13		14		Pos	Pts
Year	Class	Team	R1	R2	R1	R2	R1	R2	R1	R2	R1	R2	R1	R2	R1	R2	R1	R2	R1	R2	R1	R2	R1	R2	R1	R2	R1	R2	R1	R2	Pos	Pts
1966	500cc	Triumph-Métisse	CH -	CH; 11	AUT -	AUT -	ITA -	ITA -	DEN -	DEN -	SWE; 1	SWE; 3	FIN -	FIN -	GDR -	GDR -	CZE -	CZE -	USR -	USR -	UK -	UK -	NED -	NED -	BEL; 19	BEL -	LUX -	LUX -	GER -	GER -	12th	6
1967	500cc	Husqvarna	AUT; 12	AUT; 7	ITA -	ITA -	SWE -	SWE -	CZE -	CZE -	USR; 4	USR; 6	FRA; 3	FRA -	GER -	GER -	UK -	UK -	BEL -	BEL -	LUX -	LUX -	CH -	CH -							15th	4
1968	500cc	Husqvarna	AUT; 2	AUT; 2	ITA -	ITA -	SWE -	SWE; 2	FIN -	FIN -	GDR -	GDR -	CZE -	CZE -	UK; 9	UK; 10	GER; 2	GER; 3	FRA; 37	FRA; 2	NED; 6	NED -	BEL; 3	BEL; 2	LUX; 4	LUX; 5	CH; 1	CH; 10			4th	29
1969	500cc	Husqvarna	AUT; 1	AUT; 4	SWE; 2	SWE; 2	NED; 2	NED; 31	ITA; 1	ITA; 1	CZE; 9	CZE; 4	USR -	USR -	GER; 3	GER; 3	BEL -	BEL; 4	LUX; 4	LUX; 2	FRA; 1	FRA; 2	CH; 1	CH; 2	GDR; 4	GDR; 4					1st	94
1970	500cc	Husqvarna	CH; 1	CH; 2	AUT; 1	AUT; 2	NED; 2	NED; 29	FRA; 4	FRA; 15	FIN; 5	FIN; 2	SWE -	SWE -	CZE; 1	CZE; 2	USR -	USR -	GER; 1	GER; 2	GDR; 1	GDR -	BEL; 8	BEL; 4	LUX; 2	LUX; 2					1st	88
1971	500cc	Husqvarna	ITA -	ITA -	AUT; 7	AUT; 24	SWE -	SWE -	FIN -	FIN -	CZE; 2	CZE; 5	USR; 1	USR; 2	GDR; 1	GDR; 2	UK; 3	UK -	GER -	GER -	BEL; 3	BEL; 3	LUX; 8	LUX; 4	NED -	NED -					5th	52
1972	500cc	Husqvarna	AUT; 7	AUT; 8	CH; 3	CH; 3	SWE; 2	SWE -	FRA; 3	FRA; 4	USR; 2	USR; 6	CZE -	CZE; 1	UK; 6	UK -	GER -	GER -	GDR; 4	GDR; 4	BEL; 5	BEL -	LUX -	LUX -							7th	44
1973	500cc	Husqvarna	FRA; 8	FRA -	AUT -	AUT -	FIN -	FIN -	ITA; 5	ITA; 2	CZE; 8	CZE; 9	USA -	USA -	GER; 5	GER; 8	BEL -	BEL -	LUX -	LUX -	NED -	NED -									12th	35
1974	500cc	Bultaco	AUT; 4	AUT; 4	FRA -	FRA -	ITA; 4	ITA; 8	DEN; 8	DEN -	CZE; 8	CZE -	GER; 5	GER; 6	UK; 9	UK; 6	USA; 8	USA; 10	NED -	NED -	BEL -	BEL -	LUX -	LUX; 1							9th	69
1975	500cc	Bultaco	CH; 4	CH -	ITA -	ITA -	FIN -	FIN -	USR -	USR -	FRA; 3	FRA; 7	USA; 6	USA -	CAN -	CAN; 6	UK -	UK; 7	GER; 2	GER -	NED; 3	NED -	BEL; 5	BEL -	LUX; 4	LUX -					7th	72
1976	500cc	Bultaco	CH; 3	CH -	FRA; 10	FRA; 5	ITA; 9	ITA; 8	AUT; 10	AUT -	SWE; 9	SWE -	FIN; 4	FIN -	GER -	GER; 3	USA -	USA -	CAN -	CAN -	UK -	UK -	BEL -	BEL -	LUX -	LUX; 7					11th	47
1977	500cc	Yamaha	AUT -	AUT; 8	NED -	NED -	SWE -	SWE -	FIN -	FIN -	GER; 3	GER -	ITA -	ITA; 3	USA -	USA -	CAN -	CAN -	UK -	UK; 3	BEL -	BEL; 7	LUX; 1	LUX; 3	CH -	CH -					9th	62
1978	500cc	Yamaha	CH -	CH -	AUT -	AUT -	FRA; 8	FRA; 8	DEN -	DEN -	FIN -	FIN; 6	SWE; 4	SWE -	USA -	USA -	ITA -	ITA -	UK -	UK -	BEL; 3	BEL; 5	LUX -	LUX -	NED -	NED -					13th	33
1979	500cc	Maico	AUT -	AUT; 10	FRA -	FRA -	SWE -	SWE -	ITA -	ITA -	USA -	USA -	CAN -	CAN -	GER; 2	GER; 6	UK -	UK -	CH -	CH -	NED -	NED -	BEL -	BEL -	LUX -	LUX -					14th	18
