= Jiří Stodůlka =

Czech motocross racer (1951–2022)

- Nationality: Czech
- Born: 3 November 1948 (age 77) Valašské Meziříčí, Czechoslovakia

Motocross career
- Years active: 1968–1973
- Teams: CZ
- Wins: 1

Jiří Stodůlka (born 3 November 1948) is a Czech former motocross and enduro racer. He competed in the FIM Motocross World Championships between 1968 and 1973, most prominently as a member of the ČZ factory racing team. Along with Vlastimil Válek, Jaromír Čížek and Jaroslav Falta, he was one of the most accomplished Czech motocross racers of the early 1970s.

== Life and career ==
In 1968, Stodůlka won the 250cc Czech motocross national championship at the age of twenty. His success earned him the opportunity to compete in the 250cc Czech Grand Prix at Holice which was a round of the 1968 FIM Motocross World Championship. He scored the first World Championship points of his career with a fifth-place result, finishing as the highest scoring Czech rider. The following year, Stodůlka had the best season of his career, finishing fourth in the 1969 250cc World Championship, behind only Joël Robert, Sylvain Geboers, and Olle Pettersson.

In 1971, Stodůlka moved up to the 500cc class and scored his best result in the larger displacement class with a sixth-place finish in the 1972 500cc Motocross World Championship. That same year, he won the 500cc Czech motocross national championship. Stodůlka won the only Grand Prix of his career at the 1973 500cc Austrian Grand Prix after most of the Western European riders boycotted the race due to heavy snow on the track.

Stodůlka won two Grand Prix heat races and one Grand Prix during his career in the Motocross World Championships. He was a two-time Czech motocross national champion (1968 – 250cc, 1972 – 500cc). He was also a member of four Czech teams at the Motocross des Nations (1969–1972) and three Trophée des Nations teams (1969, 1970, 1972). Stodůlka was also the top individual points scorer at the 1970 Motocross des Nations against the top motocross riders in the world.

By the early 1970s, motocross technology began to progress rapidly as Japanese motorcycle manufacturers began to spend vast resources developing new motorcycles. The ČZ factory lacked the financial resources to maintain pace and their motorcycles became less competitive. From 1974 onward, Stodůlka concentrated on enduro racing where ČZ motorcycles remained competitive. It was in this discipline that he achieved his greatest success, winning two European Enduro Championships (1974, 1976) and took part in three Czech team victories at the International Six Days Enduro (1974, 1977, 1978).

After his racing career, Stodůlka worked as a motocross riding coach and trainer for the Dukla Mošnov sports club. He became a regular participant in historic motorsport events appearing alongside other Czech riders of his era such as Jaroslav Falta and Miroslav Nováček. Stodůlka continued to participate in the European and World Championship for Veteran riders.

== Motocross Grand Prix Results ==
Points system from 1952 to 1968:

| Position | 1st | 2nd | 3rd | 4th | 5th | 6th |
|---|---|---|---|---|---|---|
| Points | 8 | 6 | 4 | 3 | 2 | 1 |

Points system from 1969 to 1980:

| Position | 1 | 2 | 3 | 4 | 5 | 6 | 7 | 8 | 9 | 10 |
|---|---|---|---|---|---|---|---|---|---|---|
| Points | 15 | 12 | 10 | 8 | 6 | 5 | 4 | 3 | 2 | 1 |

| Year | Class | Team | 1 | | 2 | | 3 | | 4 | | 5 | | 6 | | 7 | | 8 | | 9 | | 10 | | 11 | | 12 | | 13 | | 14 | | Pos | Pts |
| Year | Class | Team | R1 | R2 | R1 | R2 | R1 | R2 | R1 | R2 | R1 | R2 | R1 | R2 | R1 | R2 | R1 | R2 | R1 | R2 | R1 | R2 | R1 | R2 | R1 | R2 | R1 | R2 | R1 | R2 | Pos | Pts |
|---|---|---|---|---|---|---|---|---|---|---|---|---|---|---|---|---|---|---|---|---|---|---|---|---|---|---|---|---|---|---|---|---|
| 1968 | 250cc | ČZ | ESP - | ESP - | BEL; 13 | BEL; 18 | CZE; 4 | CZE; 5 | FRA; 31 | FRA; 12 | NED; 22 | NED; 9 | GER; 15 | GER; 7 | LUX; 13 | LUX; 8 | POL - | POL - | USR - | USR - | YUG; 6 | YUG; 6 | FIN - | FIN - | SWE - | SWE - | UK; 7 | UK; 7 | AUT; 10 | AUT - | 19th | 4 |
| 1969 | 250cc | ČZ | ESP; 11 | ESP; 6 | CH; 11 | CH - | YUG; 4 | YUG; 6 | CZE; 5 | CZE; 7 | POL - | POL; 9 | GER; 11 | GER; 2 | NED; 28 | NED; 22 | FRA; 4 | FRA; 6 | UK; 2 | UK; 6 | SWE - | SWE - | FIN - | FIN; 5 | USR - | USR - | | | | | 4th | 44 |
| 1970 | 250cc | ČZ | ESP; 7 | ESP; 7 | FRA; 13 | FRA - | BEL; 8 | BEL; 9 | YUG; 12 | YUG; 8 | ITA; 8 | ITA; 10 | USR; 17 | USR; 4 | POL; 6 | POL; 6 | UK - | UK; 15 | FIN - | FIN - | GDR; 5 | GDR; 10 | CH; 8 | CH; 8 | AUT; 10 | AUT - | | | | | 9th | 28 |
| 1971 | 500cc | Jawa | ITA; 5 | ITA; 4 | AUT; 21 | AUT; 11 | SWE; 15 | SWE; 12 | FIN - | FIN - | CZE; 5 | CZE - | USR - | USR - | GDR - | GDR - | UK; 10 | UK; 6 | GER; 6 | GER - | BEL; 5 | BEL; 7 | LUX; 5 | LUX; 6 | NED; 14 | NED; 10 | | | | | 10th | 27 |
| 1972 | 500cc | ČZ | AUT; 4 | AUT; 4 | CH - | CH - | SWE; 14 | SWE; 5 | FRA - | FRA - | USR; 5 | USR; 7 | CZE; 3 | CZE; 5 | UK - | UK; 9 | GER; 8 | GER; 6 | GDR; 9 | GDR; 7 | BEL; 10 | BEL; 15 | LUX; 5 | LUX; 4 | | | | | | | 6th | 45 |
| 1973 | 500cc | ČZ | FRA - | FRA - | AUT; 1 | AUT; 1 | FIN; 3 | FIN; 10 | ITA; 7 | ITA; 6 | CZE - | CZE - | USA - | USA - | GER - | GER; 5 | BEL - | BEL - | LUX - | LUX - | NED - | NED - | | | | | | | | | 7th | 56 |
