= 1973 FIM Motocross World Championship =

Motocross championship season

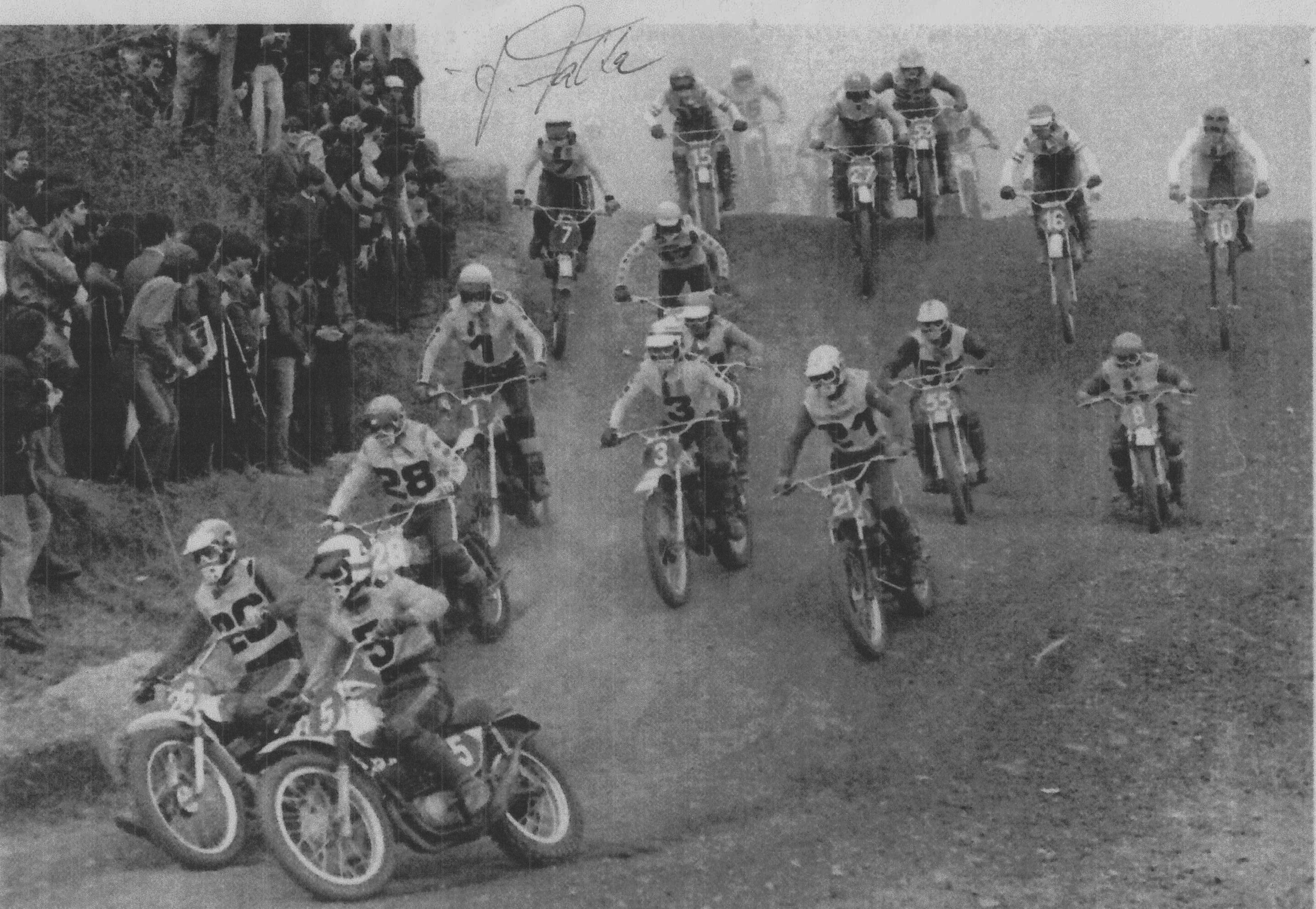
- First lap action from the 1973 250cc Spanish Grand Prix.
- Organizer: FIM
- Duration: 1 April/26 August
- Races: 21
- Manufacturers: 12

Champions
- 500cc: (Belgium) Roger De Coster
- 250cc: (Sweden) Håkan Andersson

FIM Motocross World Championship
- ← 1972 1974 →

The 1973 FIM Motocross World Championship was the 17th edition of the Motocross World Championship organized by the FIM and reserved for 500cc and 250cc motorcycles.

The FIM implements new motorcycle minimum weight restrictions as well as a new championship points scoring formula for the 1973 season. Previously, the FIM had awarded points at each Grand Prix based on a competitor's overall position after two heat races. This meant that a racer could win the first heat race yet still finish with reduced or zero points, depending on their performance in the second heat race. Beginning in 1973, points would be awarded heat race by heat race. The Grand Prix races are still run with two heat races, but it is the sum of the results of each heat that counts for the final classification of the World Championship and not the points acquired at each Grand Prix.

The 1973 season also marked the beginning of the single shock absorber rear suspension era in motocross racing when Yamaha introduced their revolutionary new Monoshock suspension. The new suspension system doubled the suspension travel available from previous systems. By the end of the decade, all the major motorcycle manufacturers would produce motorcycles using their own versions of the single shock absorber rear suspension.

== Summary ==
=== 500cc championship ===
Roger De Coster won his third consecutive 500cc world championship for Suzuki ahead of West German rider, Willy Bauer. The championship wasn't decided until the final race in the Netherlands, when Bauer suffered a mechanical breakdown, losing the championship to De Coster by two points. Kawasaki joined the world championships with Brad Lackey in the 500cc class and Torleif Hansen in the 250cc class.

Suzuki's defense of the 500cc world championship was dealt a setback when, the FIM announced a new motorcycle minimum weight limit of 209 pounds just before the start of the season. European motorcycle manufacturers competing in the championship complained to the FIM that Suzuki was spending millions of dollars to build lightweight motorcycles that the smaller European manufacturers found impossible to compete with. Suzuki had already developed and built their race bikes so, there was no time to build new bikes. As a result, Suzuki resorted to adding ballast to the bikes. Unfortunately, these alterations threw the bikes out of balance and caused them to lose traction. To make matters worse, Maico and Yamaha had developed new rear suspensions with longer travel which helped transfer power to the rear wheel over rough terrain. The Suzuki management felt they were being unjustly treated by the FIM and were slow to react to developments by the other manufacturers.

Most of the Western European riders boycotted the Austrian 500cc round due to heavy snow on the track. As the season got underway, Yamaha's new "monoshock" rear suspension began to make an impact with Christer Hammargren winning a moto and Jaak van Velthoven taking the overall win at the Finnish Grand Prix. De Coster won both motos of the Italian Grand Prix but, Bauer came back with a hard-fought victory in Czechoslovakia, relegating De Coster to second place in both motos and took the lead in the championship points tally. Bauer then took control of the championship by winning 5 out of the next 6 motos. Suzuki management's frustration at their perceived unfair treatment led to a lapse in support and, Suzuki team riders De Coster and Sylvain Geboers then took matters into their own hands by modifying their motorcycle's frames and developed new rear suspensions.

Going into the final race of the season at Sint Anthonis, Holland, Bauer was still holding the points lead but, the Suzukis were showing improvement. The Sint Anthonis track was composed of deep sand which robbed engines of power and increased fuel consumption. A Suzuki engineer calculated that their bike's gas tanks did not have sufficient capacity to finish the race. De Coster then took one of their tanks and drove two and a half hours to have the tank modified to increase its volume. He then drove back in time for the race. Despite having little sleep, De Coster scored two fourth-place finishes while Bauer suffered a mechanical failure handing De Coster his third consecutive 500cc world championship.

=== 250cc championship ===
Håkan Andersson won the 250cc world championship to give Yamaha its first motocross world championship. Yamaha's new single shock absorber rear suspension made its debut at the third round in Belgium and was proven to be successful when Andersson won the overall victory. The new suspension design would go on to revolutionize the sport with every major manufacturer producing their own version by the end of the decade. Jim Pomeroy riding a privateer Bultaco, became the first American rider to win an overall victory in an FIM Motocross Grand Prix race when he won the season opening Spanish Grand Prix. His victory also marked the first Grand Prix victory for the Bultaco factory. Competitors from nine different manufacturers placed in the top ten of the 250cc championship final standings, reflecting the thriving vitality of the sport of motocross.

== Grands Prix ==
=== 500cc ===
Round	Date	Grand Prix	Location	Race 1 Winner	Race 2 Winner	Overall Winner	Report
1	April 1	(France) French Grand Prix	Tarare	(Sweden) Christer Hammargren	(Belgium) Roger De Coster	(Netherlands) Gerrit Wolsink	Report
2	April 15	(Austria) Austrian Grand Prix	Sittendorf	(Czechoslovakia) Jiří Stodůlka	(Czechoslovakia) Jiří Stodůlka	(Czechoslovakia) Jiří Stodůlka	Report
3	May 20	(Finland) Finnish Grand Prix	Ruskeasanta	(Sweden) Christer Hammargren	(Belgium) Roger De Coster	(Belgium) Jaak van Velthoven	Report
4	May 27	(Italy) Italian Grand Prix	Pinerolo	(Belgium) Roger De Coster	(Belgium) Roger De Coster	(Belgium) Roger De Coster	Report
5	June 3	(Czechoslovakia) Czechoslovak Grand Prix	Holice	(Germany) Willy Bauer	(Germany) Willy Bauer	(Germany) Willy Bauer	Report
6	June 24	United States Grand Prix	Carlsbad	(Germany) Willy Bauer	(Germany) Willy Bauer	(Germany) Willy Bauer	Report
7	July 15	(Germany) West German Grand Prix	Bielstein	(Germany) Willy Bauer	(Belgium) Roger De Coster	(Belgium) Roger De Coster	Report
8	August 5	(Belgium) Belgian Grand Prix	Namur	(Germany) Willy Bauer	(Germany) Willy Bauer	(Germany) Willy Bauer	Report
9	August 12	Luxembourg Grand Prix	Ettelbruck	(Sweden) Åke Jonsson	(Sweden) Åke Jonsson	(Sweden) Åke Jonsson	Report
10	August 12	(Netherlands) Dutch Grand Prix	Sint Anthonis	(Sweden) Åke Jonsson	(Netherlands) Gerrit Wolsink	(Sweden) Åke Jonsson	Report

=== 250cc ===
Round	Date	Grand Prix	Location	Race 1 Winner	Race 2 Winner	Overall Winner	Report
1	April 8	(Spain) Spanish Grand Prix	Sabadell	(United States) Jim Pomeroy	(Germany) Adolf Weil	(United States) Jim Pomeroy	Report
2	April 15	(Italy) Italian Grand Prix	Serramazzoni	(Finland) Heikki Mikkola	(Soviet Union) Pavel Rulev	(Germany) Adolf Weil	Report
3	April 29	(Belgium) Belgian Grand Prix	Wuustwezel	(Finland) Heikki Mikkola	(Sweden) Håkan Andersson	(Sweden) Håkan Andersson	Report
4	May 6	(Switzerland) Swiss Grand Prix	Payerne	(Sweden) Håkan Andersson	(Sweden) Håkan Andersson	(Sweden) Håkan Andersson	Report
5	May 13	(Poland) Polish Grand Prix	Szczecin	(Sweden) Håkan Andersson	(Sweden) Håkan Andersson	(Sweden) Håkan Andersson	Report
6	May 20	(Socialist Federal Republic of Yugoslavia) Yugoslavian Grand Prix	Orehova vas	(Soviet Union) Gennady Moiseyev	(Sweden) Håkan Andersson	(Soviet Union) Gennady Moiseyev	Report
7	June 17	(France) French Grand Prix	Cassel	(Germany) Adolf Weil	(Sweden) Håkan Andersson	(Sweden) Håkan Andersson	Report
8	August 5	(Finland) Finnish Grand Prix	Hyvinkää	(Sweden) Håkan Andersson	(Sweden) Håkan Andersson	(Sweden) Håkan Andersson	Report
9	August 12	(Soviet Union) Russian Grand Prix	Leningrad	(Germany) Adolf Weil	(Germany) Adolf Weil	(Germany) Adolf Weil	Report
10	August 19	(Sweden) Swedish Grand Prix	Ulricehamn	(Sweden) Håkan Andersson	(Sweden) Håkan Andersson	(Sweden) Håkan Andersson	Report
11	August 26	(Austria) Austrian Grand Prix	Launsdorf	(Germany) Adolf Weil	(Finland) Heikki Mikkola	(Germany) Adolf Weil	Report

== Final standings ==
Beginning in 1973, points are awarded based on the results of each individual heat race and not the overall score from the individual Grands Prix. Previously points were awarded at each Grand Prix based on a competitor's overall position after two heat races rather than individually. The top 10 classified finishers in each heat race score points according to the following scale;

Position	1st	2nd	3rd	4th	5th	6th	7th	8th	9th	10th
Points	15	12	10	8	6	5	4	3	2	1

=== 500cc ===
(Results in italics indicate overall winner)

Pos	Rider	Machine	FRA (France)		AUT (Austria)		FIN (Finland)		ITA (Italy)		TCH (Czechoslovakia)		USA (United States)		GER (Germany)		BEL (Belgium)		LUX (Luxembourg)		NED (Netherlands)		Points
1	(Belgium) Roger De Coster	Suzuki		1				1	1	1	2	2	2		2	1	2	3			4	4	145
2	(West Germany) Willy Bauer	Maico	4	4				5	3		1	1	1	1	1		1	1		2			143
3	(Belgium) Jaak van Velthoven	Yamaha	2				2	2			3	3	4	3	10	6	5	2	2	3	2	3	122
4	(Sweden) Åke Jonsson	Yamaha		3			7	8			7			7	3	2		4	1	1	1	2	109
5	(Netherlands) Gerrit Wolsink	Maico	6	2				4	4	5	6	4	6	2		4	3	5	3	4		1	105
6	(Sweden) Christer Hammargren	Yamaha	1				1	3			5		8	5	4	3			7		3		87
7	(Czech Republic) Jiří Stodůlka	ČZ			1	1	3	10	7	6						5							56
8	(West Germany) Werner Schutz	Maico	5	6					6	7		6	5				6	6	4		6	9	56
9	(Czech Republic) Oldrich Hamrsmid	ČZ	3	5	2	5									6		9	7					45
10	(Czech Republic) Otakar Toman	ČZ	9	9						3	4	5			8	7	8		5		10		45
11	(United Kingdom) John Banks	Cheney-BSA								4			3	4			4		9				36
12	(Sweden) Bengt Åberg	Husqvarna	8						5	2	8	9			5	8							35
13	(United States) Brad Lackey	Kawasaki		8			9		8	8		7	10	6					6				26
14	(Netherlands) Frans Sigmans	Yamaha					4	7				8									5	8	24
15	(Austria) Walter Leitgeb	Puch			3	2																	22
16	(Soviet Union) Anatoly Botchkov	ČZ				3												10	8	6			20
17	(Sweden) Bert-Ove Wallner	Husqvarna	7	7			8	6															16
18	(Austria) Friedrich Schiechtl	Husqvarna			4	6																	13
19	(Italy) Giuseppe Cavallero	Maico							2														12
19	(Soviet Union) Vladimir Ovchinnikov	ČZ			5		5																12
19	(United Kingdom) Vic Eastwood	Maico / AJS															7	9		9		7	12
22	(Netherlands) Peter Willems	Yamaha								9						9						5	10
23	(Switzerland) Fritz Graf	Yamaha				4										10							9
24	(Belgium) Willy van Loon	ČZ																		8		6	8
25	(Italy) Paolo Piron	Husqvarna / Bultaco	10		6				10														7
26	(France) Daniel Péan	Maico																		5			6
26	(Netherlands) Pierre Karsmakers	Yamaha											7	9									6
26	(Belgium) Yvan Van den Broeck	Husqvarna / Maico													9					7			6
29	(Sweden) Arne Lindfors	Yamaha					6																5
29	(United States) John DeSoto	ČZ											9	8									5
31	(France) Serge Bacou	Bultaco													7								4
31	(Netherlands) Tony Van Erp	Maico																			7		4
31	(Belgium) Raymond Heeren	Maico																			8	10	4
31	(Belgium) Julien de Roover	ČZ																8		10			4
31	(Sweden) Arne Kring	Husqvarna		10								10									9		4
31	(Austria) Siegfried Lerner	KTM			7																		4
31	(Soviet Union) Anatoly Mandritchenko	ČZ							9	10									10				4
38	(Soviet Union) Nikolai Efimov	ČZ					10	9															3
38	(Italy) Alberto Angiolini	Maico			8																		3
38	(Czech Republic) Zdeněk Strnad	ČZ									9						10						3
41	(Soviet Union) Viatcheslav Krasnotchekov	ČZ									10												1
41	(United States) Jimmy Weinert	Kawasaki												10									1

=== 250cc ===
(Results in italics indicate overall winner)

Pos	Rider	Machine	ESP (Spain)		ITA (Italy)		BEL (Belgium)		CH (Switzerland)		POL (Poland)		YUG (Socialist Federal Republic of Yugoslavia)		FRA (France)		FIN (Finland)		USSR (Soviet Union)		SWE (Sweden)		AUT (Austria)		Points
1	(Sweden) Håkan Andersson	Yamaha	6	2	3	6	2	1	1	1	1	1		1	2	1	1	1			1	1	4		177
2	(West Germany) Adolf Weil	Maico	5	1	4	2	5	3	2	2	4				1	2	2		1	1	5	4	1	2	157
3	(Finland) Heikki Mikkola	Husqvarna	3		1		1	2		3	3		2	4	3	3	4	3	2	2		3	5	1	143
4	(Sweden) Torleif Hansen	Kawasaki	4			4	6		5		6	3	4						3	3	2	2	2	3	111
5	(Soviet Union) Gennady Moiseyev	KTM			2		4				2	2	1	3				2	4				3	6	104
6	(Czech Republic) Jaroslav Falta	ČZ	7			3		6	4	4	5	4		2			6	6	5		8		6	4	86
7	(United States) Jim Pomeroy	Bultaco	1	4	5	5		7	6			5		5			3	10	8		10				71
8	(Soviet Union) Pavel Rulev	KTM		9	6	1				8										4	7	7	7	7	49
8	(Sweden) Uno Palm	Puch							8				6	8	10	8	5	5	9	7	3	5			49
10	(Finland) Kalevi Vehkonen	Montesa	10	5			3	5	3				8	6							9				43
11	(West Germany) Hans Maisch	Maico	2	3						10	7					4									35
11	(Soviet Union) Leonid Shinkarenko	ČZ									8		7		5	5		7	6	5				10	35
13	(Soviet Union) Evgeniy Rybalchenko	ČZ	9	7	9	7					9	6	10		7	6							8		32
14	(Belgium) Harry Everts	Puch			8	9		9	7	7					8						4		9	9	30
15	(Czech Republic) Antonin Baborowsky	ČZ										8	3			10	9	9				8		5	27
15	(Belgium) Jean-Claude Laquaye	Yamaha					8						5	7	6	7	10		7						27
17	(Japan) Torao Suzuki	Yamaha					7	4							4								10	8	24
18	(Belgium) Joël Robert	Suzuki							10	5								4							15
18	(Netherlands) Jo Lammers	Montesa					10	8		9		7					8					9			15
20	(Belgium) Gaston Rahier	Suzuki		10	10	10		10	9	6															11
20	(Czech Republic) Miroslav Halm	ČZ	8	8													7			10					11
22	(Belgium) Sylvain Geboers	Suzuki																			6	6			10
23	(United Kingdom) Andy Roberton	Husqvarna									10				9				10	6					9
24	(West Germany) Herbert Schmitz	Maico			7	8																			7
25	(Czech Republic) Zdeněk Velký	ČZ										9	9			9									6
26	(Soviet Union) Alexej Kibirin	ČZ		6																					5
27	(Finland) Lars Ohberg	Montesa																8							3
27	(Finland) Jorma Jarvinen	Montesa																		8					3
29	(Soviet Union) Yuri Khudiakov	ČZ																		9					2
29	(Belgium) Claude Jobe	Montesa												9											2
29	(Belgium) Raymond Boven	Montesa					9																		2
32	(Belgium) Marcel Wiertz	Bultaco												10											1
32	(Netherlands) Stef Van der Sluis	Yamaha										10													1
32	(Sweden) Olle Pettersson	Kawasaki																				10			1
