= 1971 FIM Motocross World Championship =

Motocross championship season

- Organizer: FIM
- Duration: 18 April/3 October
- Number of races: 24
- Number of manufacturers: 10

Champions
- 500cc: (Belgium) Roger De Coster
- 250cc: (Belgium) Joël Robert

FIM Motocross World Championship
- ← 1970 1972 →

The 1971 Motocross World Championship was the 15th edition of the Motocross World Championship organized by the FIM and reserved for 500cc and 250cc motorcycles.

== Summary ==
The Suzuki factory won the premier 500cc class in their first attempt with rider Roger De Coster winning five of the 12 Grand Prix events to become the first Japanese manufacturer to win the 500cc World Championship. De Coster faced strong opposition from Maico factory team rider Åke Jonsson who won three rounds and was leading the championship going into the final event of the season in Holland.

At the season ending Dutch Grand Prix, Jonsson had built a sizeable lead over De Coster when his motorcycle’s spark plug came loose, allowing De Coster to take the lead and go to win the 1971 500 World Championship. For the second consecutive year, Jonsson had the World Championship slip from his grasp in the final round of the championship. De Coster became the first Belgian to claim the 500 division since Rene Baeten won in 1958.

In the middle of the 1971 season, the BSA factory announced that they were ceasing operations, leaving their team rider John Banks without a motorcycle. Banks would finish the season riding a privateer Husqvarna motorcycle. The BSA team remained competitive up to the end with Banks placing third at the British Grand Prix.

Suzuki also claimed the 250cc World Championship where Joël Robert dominated the smaller class, winning eight of the twelve Grand Prix events to clinch the title ahead of Husqvarna factory rider, Håkan Andersson. It would be Robert's fourth consecutive 250cc title, and second since joining the Suzuki factory racing team. It was his fifth 250cc world championship overall in his career. Four-time World Champion, Torsten Hallman, scored the Yamaha factory's first motocross world championship points with a 7th place at the 1971 250cc Dutch Grand Prix. Hallman retired at the end of the season. Siegfried Lerner scored the first motocross world championship points for the KTM factory with a 10th place at the 1971 250cc East German Grand Prix.

== Grands Prix ==
=== 500cc ===
Round	Date	Grand Prix	Location	Race 1 Winner	Race 2 Winner	Overall Winner	Report
1	April 18	(Italy) Italian Grand Prix	Macerata	(Belgium) Roger De Coster	(Belgium) Roger De Coster	(Belgium) Roger De Coster	Report
2	May 2	(Austria) Austrian Grand Prix	Sittendorf	(East Germany) Paul Friedrichs	(East Germany) Paul Friedrichs	(East Germany) Paul Friedrichs	Report
3	May 16	(Sweden) Swedish Grand Prix	Huskvarna	(Belgium) Roger De Coster	(Sweden) Christer Hammargren	(Belgium) Roger De Coster	Report
4	May 23	(Finland) Finnish Grand Prix	Ruskeasanta	(East Germany) Paul Friedrichs	(Sweden) Åke Jonsson	(East Germany) Paul Friedrichs	Report
5	June 13	(Czechoslovakia) Czechoslovak Grand Prix	Stříbro	(Belgium) Roger De Coster	(Germany) Adolf Weil	(Belgium) Roger De Coster	Report
6	June 20	(Soviet Union) Russian Grand Prix	Chișinău	(Sweden) Bengt Åberg	(Sweden) Åke Jonsson	(Sweden) Åke Jonsson	Report
7	June 27	(East Germany) East German Grand Prix	Schwerin	(Sweden) Bengt Åberg	(Sweden) Åke Jonsson	(Sweden) Bengt Åberg	Report
8	July 11	(United Kingdom) British Grand Prix	Farleigh Castle	(Sweden) Åke Jonsson	(East Germany) Paul Friedrichs	(Sweden) Åke Jonsson	Report
9	July 18	(Germany) West German Grand Prix	Bielstein	(Germany) Adolf Weil	(Sweden) Åke Jonsson	(Germany) Adolf Weil	Report
10	August 1	(Belgium) Belgian Grand Prix	Namur	(Belgium) Roger De Coster	(Belgium) Roger De Coster	(Belgium) Roger De Coster	Report
11	August 8	Luxembourg Grand Prix	Ettelbruck	(Belgium) Roger De Coster	(Sweden) Åke Jonsson	(Sweden) Åke Jonsson	Report
12	August 22	(Netherlands) Dutch Grand Prix	Sint Anthonis	(Belgium) Roger De Coster	(Sweden) Åke Jonsson	(Belgium) Roger De Coster	Report

=== 250cc ===
Round	Date	Grand Prix	Location	Race 1 Winner	Race 2 Winner	Overall Winner	Report
1	April 18	(Spain) Spanish Grand Prix	Sabadell	(Belgium) Joël Robert	(Belgium) Joël Robert	(Belgium) Joël Robert	Report
2	April 25	(Switzerland) Swiss Grand Prix	Payerne	(Belgium) Joël Robert	(Belgium) Joël Robert	(Belgium) Joël Robert	Report
3	May 2	(Poland) Polish Grand Prix	Szczecin	(Finland) Heikki Mikkola	(Finland) Kalevi Vehkonen	(Finland) Kalevi Vehkonen	Report
4	May 9	(Germany) West German Grand Prix	Beuren	(Belgium) Joël Robert	(Sweden) Torleif Hansen	(Finland) Heikki Mikkola	Report
5	May 16	(Socialist Federal Republic of Yugoslavia) Yugoslavian Grand Prix	Karlovac	(Belgium) Joël Robert	(Belgium) Joël Robert	(Belgium) Joël Robert	Report
6	May 23	(Italy) Italian Grand Prix	Busca	(Belgium) Joël Robert	(Belgium) Joël Robert	(Belgium) Joël Robert	Report
7	June 20	(Netherlands) Dutch Grand Prix	Bergharen	(Belgium) Joël Robert	(Belgium) Sylvain Geboers	(Belgium) Sylvain Geboers	Report
8	July 4	(East Germany) East German Grand Prix	Teutschenthal	(Belgium) Joël Robert	(Belgium) Joël Robert	(Belgium) Joël Robert	Report
9	August 8	(Finland) Finnish Grand Prix	Hyvinkää	(Belgium) Sylvain Geboers	(Belgium) Sylvain Geboers	(Belgium) Sylvain Geboers	Report
10	August 15	(Sweden) Swedish Grand Prix	Ulricehamn	(Belgium) Joël Robert	(Belgium) Joël Robert	(Belgium) Joël Robert	Report
11	August 22	(United Kingdom) British Grand Prix	Bristol	(Belgium) Joël Robert	(Belgium) Joël Robert	(Belgium) Joël Robert	Report
12	October 3	(Austria) Austrian Grand Prix	Launsdorf	(Sweden) Håkan Andersson	(Finland) Heikki Mikkola	(Belgium) Joël Robert	Report

== Final standings ==
Points are awarded to the top 10 classified finishers. For the 250cc and 500cc final championship standings, the 7 best of 12 results are retained.

Position	1	2	3	4	5	6	7	8	9	10
Points	15	12	10	8	6	5	4	3	2	1

=== 500cc ===
(Results in italics indicate overall winner)

Pos	Rider	Machine	ITA (Italy)		AUT (Austria)		SWE (Sweden)		FIN (Finland)		CZE (Czech Republic)		USSR (Soviet Union)		GDR (East Germany)		UK (United Kingdom)		GER (West Germany)		BEL (Belgium)		LUX (Luxembourg)		NED (Netherlands)		Points
Pos	Rider	Machine	R1	R2	R1	R2	R1	R2	R1	R2	R1	R2	R1	R2	R1	R2	R1	R2	R1	R2	R1	R2	R1	R2	R1	R2	
1	(Belgium) Roger De Coster	Suzuki	1	1	2	-	1	2	4	6	1	2	4	3	-	-	2	4	2	3	1	1	1	2	1	2	97
2	(Sweden) Åke Jonsson	Maico	-	3	5	28	5	4	3	1	4	4	2	1	2	1	1	2	3	1	2	2	2	1	10	1	93
3	(West Germany) Adolf Weil	Maico	2	2	3	2	3	5	2	3	3	1	3	4	5	-	-	-	1	2	4	-	3	18	2	6	81
4	(East Germany) Paul Friedrichs	ČZ	4	-	1	1	2	3	1	2	-	-	-	-	6	6	4	1	-	-	-	-	6	3	-	-	70
5	(Sweden) Bengt Åberg	Husqvarna	-	-	7	24	-	-	-	-	2	5	1	2	1	2	3	-	-	-	3	3	8	4	-	-	52
6	(Sweden) Christer Hammargren	Husqvarna	-	-	8	6	4	1	5	8	9	8	-	-	4	4	-	-	-	-	10	8	4	5	-	-	45
7	(United Kingdom) John Banks	BSA	11	10	12	3	-	-	8	-	8	-	5	-	3	3	9	3	10	8	-	-	-	-	-	-	37
7	(United Kingdom) John Banks	Husqvarna	-	-	-	-	-	-	-	-	-	-	-	-	-	-	-	-	-	-	6	4	9	9	-	-	37
8	(West Germany) Willy Bauer	Maico	-	-	6	4	12	8	9	-	7	6	6	5	-	7	7	9	4	-	7	9	7	8	7	8	36
9	(Belgium) Jaak van Velthoven	Husqvarna	7	-	4	27	16	6	22	5	6	3	-	-	9	5	6	5	9	7	-	5	-	-	4	4	32
10	(Czechoslovakia) Jiří Stodůlka	ČZ	5	4	21	11	15	12	-	-	5	-	-	-	-	-	10	6	6	-	5	7	5	6	14	10	27
11	(Sweden) Jan Johansson	Husqvarna	9	6	9	5	7	11	-	-	-	-	-	-	8	8	-	-	8	6	-	-	-	-	6	11	27
12	(Netherlands) Gerrit Wolsink	Husqvarna	6	8	-	-	9	-	-	4	10	-	-	-	-	-	-	-	-	-	8	6	10	-	3	3	21
13	(Belgium) Willy van Loon	Husqvarna	10	5	13	8	20	15	-	-	15	-	-	-	-	-	14	11	-	-	-	-	14	10	5	5	16
14	(Sweden) Arne Kring	Husqvarna	8	7	10	7	6	7	-	-	-	-	-	-	-	-	-	-	-	-	-	-	-	-	-	-	14
15	(Czechoslovakia) Karel Konečný	ČZ	3	-	14	9	-	19	-	-	11	7	-	-	-	-	-	7	-	-	12	10	11	7	17	-	12
16	(Czechoslovakia) Jaroslav Homola	ČZ	17	-	-	15	8	13	6	10	12	9	-	-	-	-	8	10	-	-	11	-	12	-	18	-	10
17	(Sweden) Bert-Ove Wallner	Husqvarna	-	-	-	-	-	-	7	7	-	-	-	10	-	-	-	-	-	10	-	-	-	-	-	-	9
18	(West Germany) Hans Maisch	Maico	-	-	-	-	-	-	-	-	-	-	-	-	-	-	-	-	5	5	-	-	-	-	-	-	8
19	(West Germany) Herbert Schmitz	Maico	-	-	-	-	-	-	-	-	-	-	-	-	-	-	-	-	7	4	-	-	-	-	-	-	6
20	(East Germany) Heinz Hoppe	ČZ	12	18	16	12	13	10	-	-	19	10	7	6	-	-	12	15	-	-	-	-	-	-	-	-	5
21	(Sweden) Jan Erik Sallqvist	Husqvarna	-	-	-	-	10	9	14	9	-	-	-	-	-	-	-	-	-	-	-	-	-	-	-	-	5
21	(Soviet Union) Mikhail Rastvortsev	ČZ	-	-	-	-	18	16	-	-	-	-	9	-	7	13	-	-	-	-	-	-	-	-	-	-	5
23	(Soviet Union) Viatcheslav Krasnotchekov	ČZ	-	-	-	-	21	-	-	-	14	14	8	7	10	-	-	-	-	-	-	-	-	-	-	-	4
23	(Netherlands) Peter Willems	Husqvarna	-	-	-	-	-	-	-	-	-	-	-	-	-	-	-	-	-	-	-	-	-	-	8	7	4
25	(Italy) Giuseppe Cavallero	ČZ	14	9	19	19	-	-	-	-	-	-	-	-	-	-	-	-	-	-	-	-	-	-	-	-	2
25	(United Kingdom) Jim Aird	Husqvarna	-	-	-	-	-	-	-	-	-	-	-	-	-	-	11	12	-	-	-	-	-	-	-	-	2
25	(Belgium) Riik Van Hoof	Husqvarna	-	-	-	-	-	-	-	-	-	-	-	-	-	-	-	-	-	-	9	11	-	11	-	-	2
28	(East Germany) Manfred Stein	ČZ	13	13	-	-	-	-	-	-	-	-	-	-	-	-	16	17	-	-	-	-	-	-	-	-	1
28	(Austria) Siegfried Lerner	KTM	-	-	11	13	-	-	-	-	-	-	-	-	-	-	-	-	-	-	-	-	-	-	-	-	1
28	(Czechoslovakia) Vlastimil Válek	ČZ	-	-	-	-	-	-	-	-	13	11	-	-	-	-	-	-	-	-	-	-	-	-	-	-	1
28	(Soviet Union) Anatoly Botchkov	ČZ	-	-	-	-	-	-	-	-	-	-	10	-	-	-	-	-	-	-	-	-	-	-	-	-	1
28	(Soviet Union) Vladimir Ovchinnikov	ČZ	-	-	-	-	-	-	-	-	-	-	-	8	11	10	-	-	-	-	-	-	-	-	-	-	1
28	(Switzerland) Walter Kalberer	Husqvarna	-	-	-	-	-	-	-	-	-	-	-	-	-	-	-	-	-	9	-	-	-	-	-	-	1
28	(Netherlands) Jo Keizer	Husqvarna	-	-	-	-	-	-	-	-	-	-	-	-	-	-	-	-	-	-	13	12	-	-	9	9	1
-	(Finland) Pauli Pippola	Husqvarna	-	-	15	10	11	-	10	-	-	-	-	-	-	-	-	-	-	-	-	-	-	-	11	12	0
-	(United Kingdom) Andy Roberton	BSA	-	-	-	-	-	-	-	-	-	-	-	-	-	-	5	8	-	-	-	-	-	-	-	-	0

=== 250cc ===
(Results in italics indicate overall winner)

Pos	Rider	Machine	ESP (Spain)		CH (Switzerland)		POL (Poland)		GER (West Germany)		YUG (Socialist Federal Republic of Yugoslavia)		ITA (Italy)		NED (Netherlands)		GDR (East Germany)		FIN (Finland)		SWE (Sweden)		UK (United Kingdom)		AUT (Austria)		Pts
Pos	Rider	Machine	R1	R2	R1	R2	R1	R2	R1	R2	R1	R2	R1	R2	R1	R2	R1	R2	R1	R2	R1	R2	R1	R2	R1	R2	
1	(Belgium) Joël Robert	Suzuki	1	1	1	1	4	-	1	-	1	1	1	1	1	2	1	1	2	2	1	1	1	1	2	2	105
2	(Sweden) Håkan Andersson	Husqvarna	5	3	9	8	5	2	6	3	-	-	5	9	-	-	2	3	3	3	3	2	5	4	1	-	72
3	(Belgium) Sylvain Geboers	Suzuki	-	-	-	-	12	8	-	-	2	2	-	-	2	1	3	2	1	1	-	-	2	2	-	-	66
4	(Finland) Heikki Mikkola	Husqvarna	-	-	2	3	1	3	2	2	-	-	2	3	-	-	-	-	-	-	2	-	-	-	3	1	63
5	(Sweden) Olle Pettersson	Suzuki	4	2	7	5	6	6	7	11	-	4	-	7	3	3	7	5	4	6	-	-	3	3	-	-	59
6	(Sweden) Uno Palm	Husqvarna	14	-	5	4	7	4	-	-	5	3	4	5	5	5	-	-	9	4	-	-	10	7	5	9	53
7	(Czechoslovakia) Miroslav Halm	ČZ	-	-	4	6	11	9	8	4	7	5	8	2	-	8	4	10	5	-	-	5	4	5	4	4	46
8	(Soviet Union) Vladimir Kavinov	ČZ	8	4	6	2	8	5	5	8	-	-	-	4	6	-	6	6	6	7	-	-	8	6	6	-	41
9	(Czechoslovakia) Jaroslav Falta	ČZ	-	-	8	10	-	-	3	7	3	7	6	6	9	-	9	7	-	10	-	-	13	-	7	3	36
10	(Finland) Kalevi Vehkonen	Husqvarna	6	-	12	7	2	1	-	-	-	-	-	-	4	4	-	-	7	5	4	-	11	10	8	-	33
11	(Belgium) Gaston Rahier	ČZ	3	6	11	9	-	-	18	6	-	-	3	10	-	-	-	-	-	-	8	7	-	-	-	-	20
12	(Sweden) Torleif Hansen	Husqvarna	7	-	-	-	-	-	4	1	8	6	-	-	-	-	-	-	-	-	-	-	-	-	-	-	17
13	(Soviet Union) Pavel Rulev	ČZ	22	11	-	-	-	-	11	9	6	9	-	-	7	6	-	-	-	8	-	-	12	13	-	7	16
14	(Belgium) Marcel Wiertz	Bultaco	9	7	-	14	-	-	-	-	10	10	-	-	-	-	-	-	-	-	-	-	-	-	9	6	13
15	(Soviet Union) Gennady Moiseyev	ČZ	2	-	3	-	3	-	9	5	9	-	7	8	-	-	10	4	8	-	-	-	6	-	-	-	12
16	(Sweden) Bengt Arne Bonn	Husqvarna	11	-	-	-	-	-	-	-	-	-	-	-	-	-	-	-	-	-	6	3	16	-	-	-	10
17	(Soviet Union) Alexej Kibirine	ČZ	-	-	-	-	-	-	-	-	-	-	-	-	-	-	-	-	-	-	9	6	17	-	10	8	10
18	(Sweden) Gunnar Nilsson	Husqvarna	-	-	-	-	-	-	-	-	-	-	-	-	-	-	-	-	-	-	5	4	-	-	-	-	8
19	(United Kingdom) Bryan Wade	Husqvarna	12	5	-	-	9	7	-	-	-	-	-	-	-	-	-	-	-	-	-	-	7	-	-	-	8
20	(Czechoslovakia) Otakar Toman	ČZ	-	-	10	-	-	-	-	-	-	-	-	-	-	-	5	9	-	-	-	9	-	-	-	5	7
21	(Austria) Siegfried Lerner	KTM	-	-	13	-	-	-	-	-	-	-	-	-	10	12	8	8	-	-	-	10	-	-	-	-	5
22	(Sweden) Torsten Hallman	Yamaha	-	-	-	-	-	-	-	-	-	-	-	-	8	10	-	-	-	-	-	-	-	-	-	-	4
23	(Belgium) François Minne	Ossa	13	8	-	-	-	-	-	-	-	-	-	-	-	-	-	-	-	-	-	-	-	-	-	-	3
23	(Finland) Jyrki Storm	Husqvarna	-	-	-	-	-	-	-	-	-	-	9	-	11	9	-	-	-	-	-	-	20	-	-	-	3
23	(Sweden) Stig Pettersson	Husqvarna	-	-	-	-	-	-	-	-	-	-	-	-	-	-	-	-	10	9	7	-	-	-	-	-	3
23	(United Kingdom) Andy Roberton	Husqvarna	-	-	-	-	-	-	-	-	-	-	-	-	-	-	-	-	-	-	-	-	9	9	-	-	3
27	(East Germany) Helmut Schadenberg	ČZ	-	-	-	13	-	10	-	-	-	-	-	-	-	-	-	12	-	-	-	-	-	-	-	-	3
28	(Belgium) George Houssonlonge	Montesa	17	10	-	-	-	-	-	-	-	-	-	-	-	-	-	-	-	-	-	-	-	-	-	-	2
28	(Austria) Friedrich Schiechtl	Husqvarna	-	-	-	-	-	-	-	-	-	-	-	-	-	-	-	-	-	-	-	-	-	-	-	10	2
30	(Sweden) Lars Forsberg	Montesa	15	13	-	-	-	-	-	-	-	-	-	-	-	-	-	-	-	-	-	-	-	-	-	-	1
30	(United Kingdom) Malcolm Davis	Bultaco	-	-	-	-	-	-	-	-	15	8	-	-	-	-	-	-	-	-	-	-	-	-	-	-	1
30	(Czechoslovakia) Oldřich Hamršmíd	ČZ	-	-	-	-	-	-	-	-	-	-	10	-	-	-	-	-	-	-	-	-	-	-	-	-	1
30	(Denmark) Erling Rasmussen	Husqvarna	-	-	-	-	-	-	-	-	-	-	-	-	-	-	-	-	-	-	10	-	22	15	-	-	1
30	(Czechoslovakia) Jiří Churavý	ČZ	-	-	-	-	-	-	-	-	-	-	-	-	-	-	-	-	-	-	-	-	-	8	-	-	1
30	(Belgium) Harry Everts	Puch	-	-	-	-	-	-	-	-	-	-	-	-	-	-	-	-	-	-	-	-	-	-	-	11	1
-	(Japan) Taichi Yoshimura	Suzuki	10	-	-	-	-	-	-	-	-	-	-	-	-	-	-	-	-	-	-	-	-	-	-	-	0
