= Sylvain Geboers =

Belgian motorcycle racer

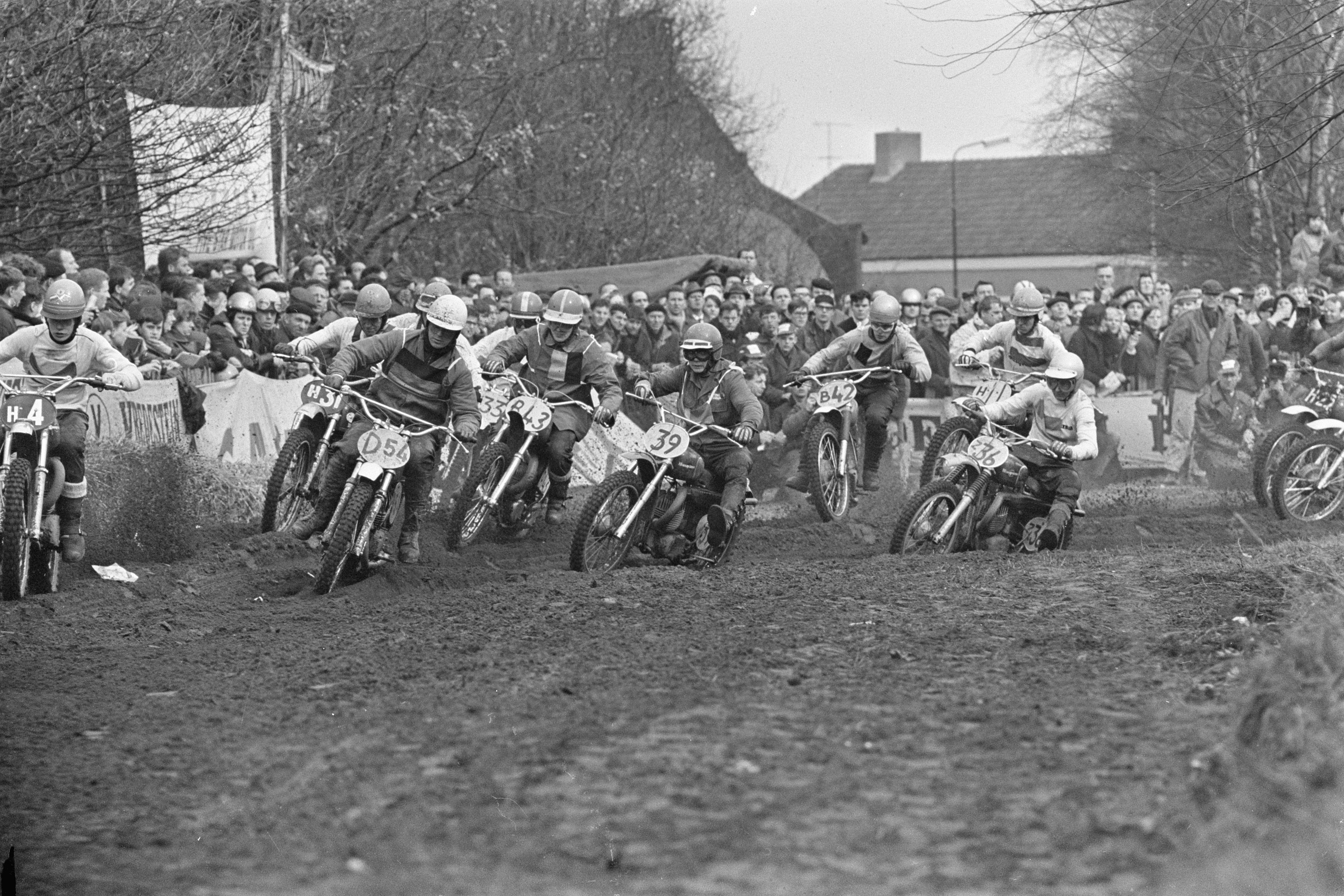
- Nationality: Belgian
- Born: 28 March 1945 (age 81) Balen, Belgium

Motocross career
- Years active: 1964–1966, 1968–1975
- Teams: Matchless, Lindström, ČZ, Suzuki
- Wins: 14

Sylvain Geboers (born 28 March 1945) is a Belgian former professional motocross racer and motocross racing team manager. He competed in the Motocross World Championships between 1964 and 1975. Although he was often overshadowed by his contemporary, the six-time World Champion, Joël Robert, Geboers was one of the top motocross racers of the late 1960s and early 1970s. During a five year period from 1968 to 1972, he finished in the top three of the FIM 250cc Motocross World Championships.

After his competitive career had ended, Geboers became the longtime team manager for the Suzuki Motocross Grand Prix team. He was the older brother of five-time Motocross World Champion, Eric Geboers.

== Motocross racing career ==
=== Early years ===
Geboers was born in Balen, Belgium on 28 March 1945 and grew up in nearby Mol, Belgium. His father was an amateur motocross racer who owned a petrol station that also sold automobiles, mopeds and scooters. Sylvain Geboers was the oldest of five brothers with Eric Geboers being the youngest, 16 years his junior. All five brothers followed their father's lead and became motorcycle racers. A supporter's club was formed out of a desire to help further the racing careers of the Geboers brothers. For nearly 30 years, from the beginning of Sylvain's career in the early 1960s to the end of Eric's career in 1990, the supporter's club remained active by raising funds through subscription fees and by organizing tours to watch the brothers compete.

Geboers began motocross racing at the age of 16 riding a large, heavy 500cc four-stroke motorcycle. By the time he was 17 years old, he had won the 500cc Belgian Junior National Championship riding a BSA Gold Star motorcycle. He became known as a sand track specialist because of the many sand tracks located near his home in Belgium, and across the border in Holland. Sand tracks require great stamina as well as high speeds to avoid getting bogged down in the deep, sandy soil.

At the age of 19, Geboers surged to prominence in his first world championship race at the 1964 500cc Belgian Grand Prix. The setting of the Belgian Grand Prix was a rugged, narrow track in the forests surrounding the picturesque hilltop Citadel of Namur. First held in 1947, the Namur Grand Prix was revered by motocross enthusiasts in the same manner that auto racing enthusiasts considered the Monaco Grand Prix to be the crown jewel of the Formula One season. In the first heat race he finished in fourth-place ahead of former World Champions Bill Nilsson (Jawa), Sten Lundin (Lito) and Rolf Tibblin (Hedlund).

Geboers earned a place on the Belgian team in the 1964 Motocross des Nations held at Hawkstone Park, England. He placed ninth in the first heat race then scored an impressive second place in the second heat behind the reigning World Champion, Jeff Smith (BSA). His score helped the Belgian team finish second to the British team.

=== Grand Prix racing ===
Geboers' impressive performance at the Motocross des Nations got the attention of the Matchless motorcycle company who offered him support for the 1965 season riding their new four-stroke Model G85CS race bike. However, by the mid 1960s heavier four-stroke motorcycles like Matchless were being rendered obsolete by rapid advances in two-stroke engine technology which made apparent the importance of lightness and agility in motocross racing, and Geboers failed to score any world championship points that year. He was once again named to the Belgian team in the 1965 Motocross des Nations event held at the Namur Circuit in Belgium where the Belgian team once again finished second to the British team led by Jeff Smith and Don Rickman.

Geboers competed in the 1966 250cc World Championship riding a Lindström motorcycle. Lindströms were Husqvarna motorcycles modified by Swedish engine tuner Göte Lindström to withstand the rigors of motocross. He scored his first world championship points while riding a Lindström at the 1966 500cc Danish Grand Prix where he finished in third place behind Rolf Tibblin (ČZ) and Paul Friedrichs (ČZ). Geboers joined the Belgian team for the 1966 Motocross des Nations event at Remalard, France where they finished second to the British team for the third consecutive year.

Geboers switched to a ČZ motorcycle for the 1967 season, as the Czechoslovak company had become the premier manufacturer of motocross bikes in the late 1960s. He was named to the Belgian team for the 1967 Trophée des Nations event in Holice, Czechoslovakia. Geboers placed 16th as the Belgian team finished in fifth place. At the 1967 Motocross des Nations event in Markelo, Holland, he failed to score any points as the Belgian team finished in third place.

=== ČZ factory team ===
Joël Robert (ČZ) and Torsten Hallman (Husqvarna) were the top two contenders expected to challenge for the 1968 250cc World Championship. In order to provide Robert support, Geboers began to receive full support from the ČZ factory. He won the first overall victory of his career on a ČZ motorcycle at the 1968 250cc Belgian Grand Prix held in Genk. He scored another five podium positions to end the season ranked third behind the perennial World Championship contenders, Robert and Hallman. Geboers was named to the Belgian team for the 1968 Trophée des Nations event at Payerne, Switzerland however, he failed to score any points as the Belgians finished second to the Swedish team.

In 1969, ČZ teammates Geboers and Robert would engage in a season long battle for the 250cc World Championship that wasn't decided until the final race of the season. Robert won six Grand Prix races while Geboers won four as Robert claimed his third World Championship. Geboers actually scored more points overall than Robert but falls victim to FIM scoring rules which only recognizes the top seven of twelve results. The rules would be changed in 1977. Robert came from the French-speaking Wallonia region of Belgium while Geboers was from the Dutch-speaking region of Belgium known as Flanders. His rivalry with Robert came during a period of political and linguistic strife between the two regions during the 1970s and 1980s. The political climate created tension between supporters of each rider. Geboers was also a member of the Belgian team that won the 1969 Motocross des Nations for 500cc motorcycles and the Trophée des Nations for 250cc motorcycles, marking the first Belgian victory in eighteen years at the event.

=== Joining the Suzuki team ===
The Suzuki factory became the first Japanese manufacturer to compete in a Motocross World Championship event at the 1965 250cc Swedish Grand Prix, and with the help of Swedish rider, Olle Pettersson, they had developed their motocycle to the point where Pettersson finished the 1969 250cc World Championship in third place behind Robert and Geboers. The Suzuki team then hired both Geboers and Robert for their 250cc world championship team. The two Suzuki teammates dominated the 1970 championship with each rider claiming four Grand Prix victories apiece. As with the previous year, the championship wasn't decided until the final round in Austria where Robert prevailed over his teammate by a slim two-point margin. Geboers was the top individual points scorer at the 1970 Trophée des Nations event at Knutsdorp, Sweden as he led the Belgian team to victory. He competed in the 1970 Inter-AM Motocross Series where he scored two third-place results.

Although Geboers missed the start of the 1971 season due to a serious knee injury, he scored four podiums in the last six Grand Prix races to finish the season in third place behind Robert and Håkan Andersson (Husqvarna). Geboers once again led the Belgian team to victory as the top individual points scorer at the 1971 Trophée des Nations event at Holice, Czechoslovakia. At the 1971 Motocross des Nations in Vannes, France, he finished second to Åke Jonsson (Maico) in both heat races as the Belgian team placed second to the Swedish team.

After the 250cc world championships, Geboers participated in the 1971 Trans-AMA motocross series in the United States. The Trans-AMA was an international series for 500cc motorcycles established as a pilot event to help establish motocross in the United States. Geboers won three rounds to win the 1971 Trans-AMA Series ahead of Adolf Weil (Maico) and Torleif Hansen (Husqvarna).

Geboers began the 1972 season with a victory at the season opening 250cc Spanish Grand Prix however, one week later he suffered a broken ankle during practice for the 250cc French Grand Prix. Although he was able to return five weeks later and finish second to Robert at the 250cc Dutch Grand Prix, the injury eliminated him from contention for the title. Robert would dominate the season by winning six of the twelve Grand Prix events to clinch the title with four races to go. Geboers made an impressive recovery from his injury to challenge Håkan Andersson (Yamaha) for second place in the championship however, at the final race of the season in Switzerland, he suffered a serious leg fracture.

=== Later career ===
Geboers missed most of the 1973 season recovering from his injury but, he returned in September to ride for the Belgian team that won the 1973 Motocross des Nations and the Trophée des Nations events. He won the final Grand Prix of his career at the 1974 250cc Dutch Grand Prix ahead of Harry Everts (Puch) and the eventual World Champion, Gennady Moiseyev (KTM). He competed as a privateer in the 1975 250cc championship riding a Husqvarna motorcycle. His final world championship appearance came at the 1977 500cc Swiss Grand Prix. Geboers continued to ride in non-championship events until retiring in 1978 at the age of 33. His final race came on 15 August 1978, the same day that his younger brother Eric Geboers made his professional motocross racing debut. Eric Geboers went on to become one of the most successful motocross racers of the 1980s.

In 1978, Geboers was practicing with five-time World Champion Roger De Coster when De Coster was seriously injured in a motocross accident. Geboers is credited with saving De Coster's life after recognizing the severity of his injuries and rushing him to a surgeon where he had to have his spleen removed.

== Career overview ==
Geboers won 21 individual heat races and 14 Grand Prix victories during his world championship racing career. He was a member of two victorious Belgian Motocross des Nations teams (1969, 1973) and four victorious Belgian Trophée des Nations teams (1969-1971, 1973). He was also the top individual points scorer at the 1970 and 1971 Trophée des Nations events.

== Suzuki team manager ==
After his racing career had ended, Geboers managed Suzuki's European motocross team until 2016 when, he turned over his duties to Stefan Everts. As team manager, he guided Eric Geboers, Georges Jobé, Greg Albertyn, Donny Schmit, Mickaël Pichon, Steve Ramon and Stefan Everts to world championships.

== Motocross Grand Prix Results ==
Points system from 1952 to 1968:

| Position | 1st | 2nd | 3rd | 4th | 5th | 6th |
|---|---|---|---|---|---|---|
| Points | 8 | 6 | 4 | 3 | 2 | 1 |

Points system from 1969 to 1980:

| Position | 1 | 2 | 3 | 4 | 5 | 6 | 7 | 8 | 9 | 10 |
|---|---|---|---|---|---|---|---|---|---|---|
| Points | 15 | 12 | 10 | 8 | 6 | 5 | 4 | 3 | 2 | 1 |

(Results in italics indicate overall winner)

| Year | Class | Team | 1 | | 2 | | 3 | | 4 | | 5 | | 6 | | 7 | | 8 | | 9 | | 10 | | 11 | | 12 | | 13 | | 14 | | Pos | Pts |
| Year | Class | Team | R1 | R2 | R1 | R2 | R1 | R2 | R1 | R2 | R1 | R2 | R1 | R2 | R1 | R2 | R1 | R2 | R1 | R2 | R1 | R2 | R1 | R2 | R1 | R2 | R1 | R2 | R1 | R2 | Pos | Pts |
|---|---|---|---|---|---|---|---|---|---|---|---|---|---|---|---|---|---|---|---|---|---|---|---|---|---|---|---|---|---|---|---|---|
| 1964 | 500cc | Métisse | CH - | CH - | AUT - | AUT - | DEN - | DEN - | SWE - | SWE - | NED - | NED - | FRA - | FRA - | ITA - | ITA - | URS - | URS - | TCH - | TCH - | BEL; 4 | BEL - | LUX - | LUX - | GER - | GER - | GDR - | GDR - | ESP - | ESP - | - | 0 |
| 1965 | 500cc | Matchless | AUT; 6 | AUT - | CH - | CH - | FRA; 6 | FRA - | FIN - | FIN - | SWE; 12 | SWE; 15 | GDR - | GDR - | TCH - | TCH - | USR - | USR - | UK; 8 | UK - | ITA - | ITA - | GER - | GER - | NED - | NED - | LUX - | LUX - | | | - | 0 |
| 1966 | 500cc | Lindström | CH; 10 | CH; 15 | AUT; 13 | AUT; 11 | ITA - | ITA - | DEN; 3 | DEN; 3 | SWE - | SWE; 6 | FIN - | FIN - | GDR - | GDR - | TCH - | TCH - | USR - | USR - | UK; 16 | UK - | NED; 7 | NED - | BEL; 8 | BEL - | LUX - | LUX - | GER - | GER - | 17th | 4 |
| 1968 | 250cc | ČZ | ESP; 5 | ESP; 5 | BEL; 2 | BEL; 2 | TCH; 5 | TCH; 4 | FRA; 5 | FRA; 3 | NED; 3 | NED; 6 | GER; 14 | GER - | LUX; 10 | LUX; 7 | POL; 2 | POL; 4 | USR - | USR - | YUG; 3 | YUG; 3 | FIN - | FIN - | SWE - | SWE - | UK - | UK - | AUT; 3 | AUT; 4 | 3rd | 31 |
| 1969 | 250cc | ČZ | ESP; 10 | ESP; 2 | CH; 2 | CH; 2 | YUG; 2 | YUG; 3 | TCH; 1 | TCH; 1 | POL; 3 | POL; 2 | GER; 6 | GER; 3 | NED; 1 | NED; 2 | FRA; 5 | FRA; 2 | UK; 1 | UK; 3 | SWE; 1 | SWE; 1 | FIN; 2 | FIN - | USR; 3 | USR - | | | | | 2nd | 96 |
| 1970 | 250cc | Suzuki | ESP; 2 | ESP; 3 | FRA; 12 | FRA; 2 | BEL; 2 | BEL; 1 | YUG; 5 | YUG; 2 | ITA; 3 | ITA; 1 | USR; 1 | USR; 1 | POL; 1 | POL; 1 | UK; 2 | UK - | FIN - | FIN; 4 | GDR; 1 | GDR; 1 | CH - | CH; 2 | AUT; 3 | AUT - | | | | | 2nd | 94 |
| 1971 | 250cc | Suzuki | ESP - | ESP - | CH - | CH - | POL; 12 | POL; 8 | GER - | GER - | YUG; 2 | YUG; 2 | ITA - | ITA - | NED; 2 | NED; 1 | GDR; 3 | GDR; 2 | FIN; 1 | FIN; 1 | SWE - | SWE - | UK; 2 | UK; 2 | AUT - | AUT - | | | | | 3rd | 66 |
| 1972 | 250cc | Suzuki | ESP; 2 | ESP; 1 | FRA - | FRA - | NED; 2 | NED; 3 | TCH - | TCH - | YUG; 2 | YUG; 3 | GER; 8 | GER; 3 | POL; 2 | POL - | USR; 3 | USR - | FIN; 1 | FIN; 1 | SWE - | SWE - | UK; 3 | UK - | CH - | CH - | | | | | 3rd | 62 |
| 1973 | 250cc | Suzuki | ESP - | ESP - | ITA - | ITA - | BEL - | BEL - | CH - | CH - | POL - | POL - | YUG - | YUG - | FRA - | FRA - | FIN - | FIN - | USR - | USR - | SWE; 6 | SWE; 6 | AUT - | AUT - | | | | | | | 22nd | 10 |
| 1974 | 250cc | Suzuki | ESP - | ESP; 7 | ITA - | ITA - | TCH - | TCH - | POL; 5 | POL - | YUG - | YUG - | UK - | UK - | GER; 3 | GER; 8 | NED; 1 | NED; 2 | FIN - | FIN - | SWE - | SWE - | CH; 8 | CH - | | | | | | | 11th | 53 |
| 1975 | 250cc | Husqvarna | ESP; 4 | ESP - | AUT - | AUT - | BEL - | BEL - | TCH - | TCH - | POL; 7 | POL - | YUG - | YUG; 10 | GER - | GER - | UK - | UK - | FRA - | FRA - | SWE - | SWE - | FIN - | FIN - | CH - | CH - | | | | | 21st | 13 |
| 1976 | 250cc | Maico | ESP - | ESP - | BEL - | BEL - | TCH - | TCH - | POL; 7 | POL - | USR - | USR - | YUG - | YUG - | ITA - | ITA - | FRA - | FRA - | UK - | UK - | GER - | GER - | NED - | NED - | SWE - | SWE - | | | | | 25th | 4 |
| 1977 | 500cc | Maico | AUT - | AUT - | NED - | NED - | SWE - | SWE - | FIN - | FIN - | GER - | GER - | ITA - | ITA - | USA - | USA - | CAN - | CAN - | UK - | UK - | BEL - | BEL - | LUX - | LUX - | CH; 9 | CH - | | | | | 36th | 2 |
