= Håkan Andersson (motorcyclist) =

Swedish motocross racer (born 1945)

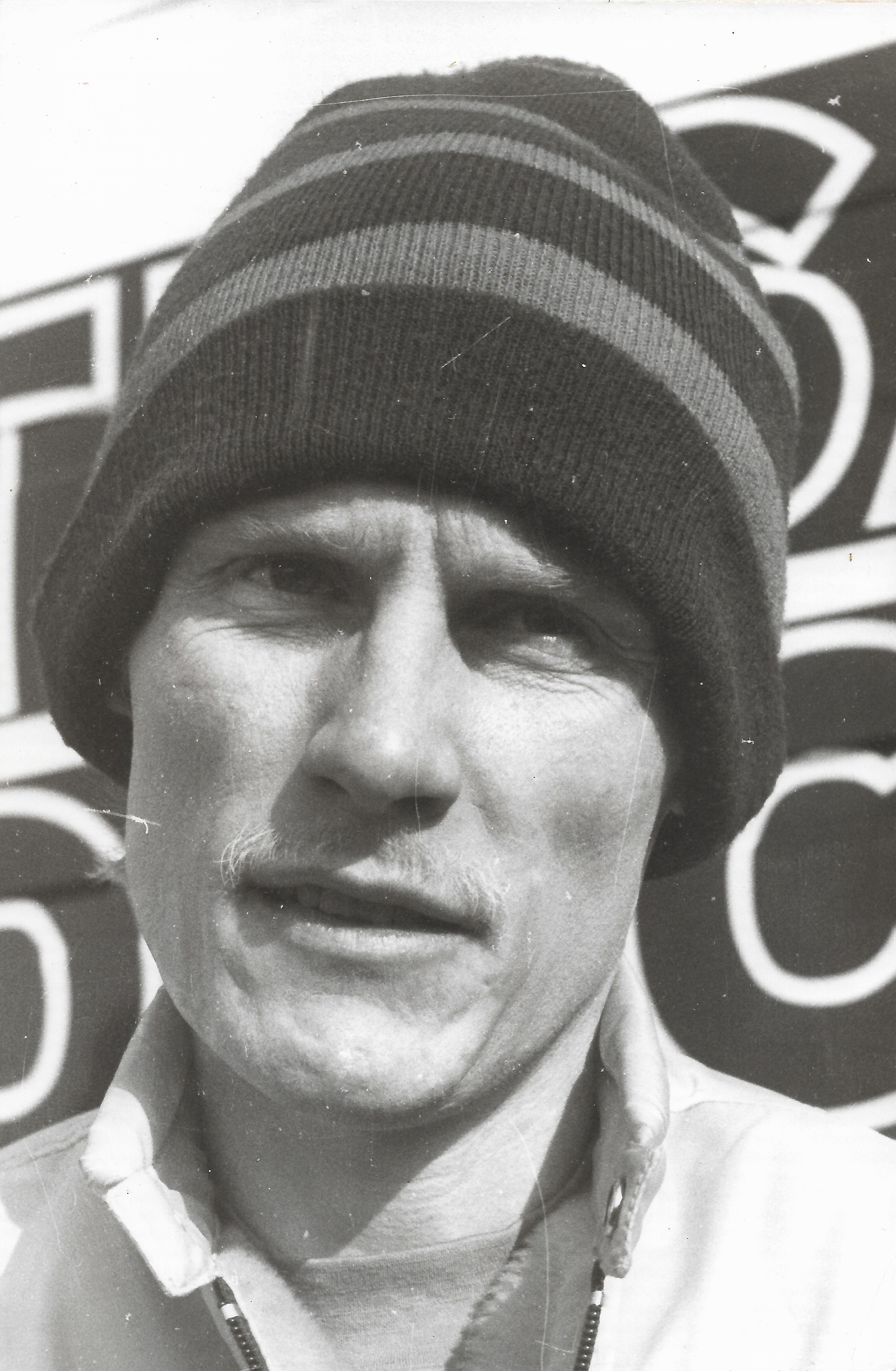
- Hakan Andersson in 1976
- Nationality: Swedish
- Born: 29 June 1945 (age 81) Uddevalla, Sweden

Motocross career
- Years active: 1966–1979
- Teams: Husqvarna, Yamaha, Montesa
- Championships: 250cc - 1973
- Wins: 10

Håkan Andersson (born 29 June 1945) is a Swedish former professional motocross racer. He competed in the Motocross World Championships from 1966 to 1979. Andersson began his career as a member of the Husqvarna factory racing team before moving to the Yamaha team where he won the FIM 250cc Motocross World Championship in 1973. He was also a three-time 250cc class Vice Champion. During a motocross era dominated by Joël Robert, Andersson was one of the few competitors who was able to compete evenly with Robert.

== Motocross racing career ==
=== Early racing ===
Andersson was born in Uddevalla, on the west coast of Sweden on 29 June 1945. As a young boy, his father took him to watch local motocross races where he idolized Swedish riders such as Bill Nilsson, Sten Lundin, and Rolf Tibblin who dominated the sport of motocross in the 1950s and 1960s.

Andersson competed in his first motocross race in 1962 at the age of 16 riding a 175cc Husqvarna motorcycle. He later served in the Swedish military as a motorcycle despatch rider. In 1963, he competed in the Junior Class of Swedish motocross racing and within three years he had advanced to the Senior Class. Andersson's hometown friend, Eje Skarin, also enjoyed motocross and followed him to races, eventually becoming his race mechanic for his entire motocross racing career.

=== Husqvarna team member ===
Andersson's racing success earned him support from the Husqvarna factory along with other Swedish racers such as Torsten Hallman, Åke Jonsson, Bengt Åberg and Arne Kring. Hallman, a four-time Motocross World Champion, became his racing mentor. At the age of 21, he competed in his first Motocross World Championship event at the 1966 250cc Swedish Grand Prix where he scored an impressive third place in the first heat race and was lying in third place in the second race when he had to abandon the race due to a tire puncture.

When the Husqvarna team transferred Åke Jonsson from the 250cc class to the 500cc class for the 1967 season, Andersson took his place competing in the 250cc class riding in support of the defending 250cc World Champion, Hallman. Hallman's main rival for the 1967 250cc World Championship was the 1964 World Champion Joël Robert riding for the ČZ factory team. Robert was considered to be the fastest motocross racer in the world, but his lackadaisical attitude towards physical fitness training as well as numerous mechanical issues had kept him from repeating his 1964 success.

Andersson scored four consecutive third place finishes at the Swedish and Finnish Grand Prix races to end the 1967 season ranked sixth while his teammate Hallman won his fourth and final 250cc World Championship. Andersson was a member of the victorious Swedish team at the 1967 Trophée des Nations, however he suffered a serious leg injury during the event.

=== 1968: Breakout year ===
At the 1968 season season opening Spanish Grand Prix, Andersson had retired from the first race, but showed his potential in the second race by catching and passing former World Champions Dave Bickers (ČZ) and Robert to finish in second place behind his teammate Hallman. At the second round in Belgium, he finished the first race in third place and then won the second race after Robert withdrew with an engine failure. Andersson then won the first overall victory of his career at the 1968 250cc Czechoslovak Grand Prix where he decisively beat the previously dominant Robert in both races. In the French Grand Prix, he finished the first race in third place behind Robert and Hallman before defeating Robert once again in the second race.

After the first four rounds of the World Championship, Andersson's impressive performance made him a strong contender for the title and placed him second to Robert by just two points in the championship points standings. However, Andersson's 1968 season came to an end at the fifth round in the Netherlands when he suffered a serious leg injury. He had passed Robert to take the lead of the second race when his handlebar broke causing him to crash and fracture his leg in three places. It was the same leg he had injured six months before at the 1967 Trophée des Nations event and his doctors told him that the injury was so serious that he would never ride a motorcycle again.

Andersson was determined to resume his racing career but had a lengthy recovery that was complicated by a bad leg infection. After missing almost two years of racing including the entire 1969 season, he returned to race in the 1970 250cc World Championship, however he still hadn't fully recovered from his 1968 accident and was 13th in the final standings. By the 1971 season he had returned to top form, finishing on the podium in six of twelve rounds to place second in the 250cc World Championship behind Joël Robert, who was now riding for the Suzuki factory team. He helped Team Sweden take runner-up in the 1971 Trophée des Nations and he was also crowned Swedish National Champion.

=== Move to Yamaha team ===
Andersson's contract with Husqvarna expired at the end of the 1971 season so he took the opportunity to sign a contract to race for the Yamaha factory racing team replacing Torsten Hallman. Hallman had spent the previous season developing the new Yamaha YZ250 model before retiring from competition to take on a role with the Yamaha team as a development advisor. Andersson suffered a broken wrist while testing the Yamaha before the start of the 1972 season forcing him to miss the first three rounds. By midseason he had regained full strength and finished on the podium in six of the seven final Grand Prix races. He won the Swedish and Swiss Grand Prix races to end the year on a high note. Despite missing the early rounds, Andersson ended the season runner-up to Robert in the 250cc World Championship for a second consecutive year.

In 1973, Yamaha introduced a new and innovative single shock absorber rear suspension that would revolutionize the sport of motocross. Andersson took advantage of the new suspension to claim six Grand Prix victories to win the 1973 250cc Motocross World Championship ahead of Adolf Weil (Maico) and Heikki Mikkola (Husqvarna). His longtime mechanic, Eje Skarin, was instrumental in the development of the new motorcycle, working alongside the Japanese Yamaha engineers. Andersson's victory marked the first Motocross World Championship for the Yamaha factory team. At the season ending 1973 Motocross des Nations event, he helped Team Sweden take runner-up position behind the powerful Belgian team.

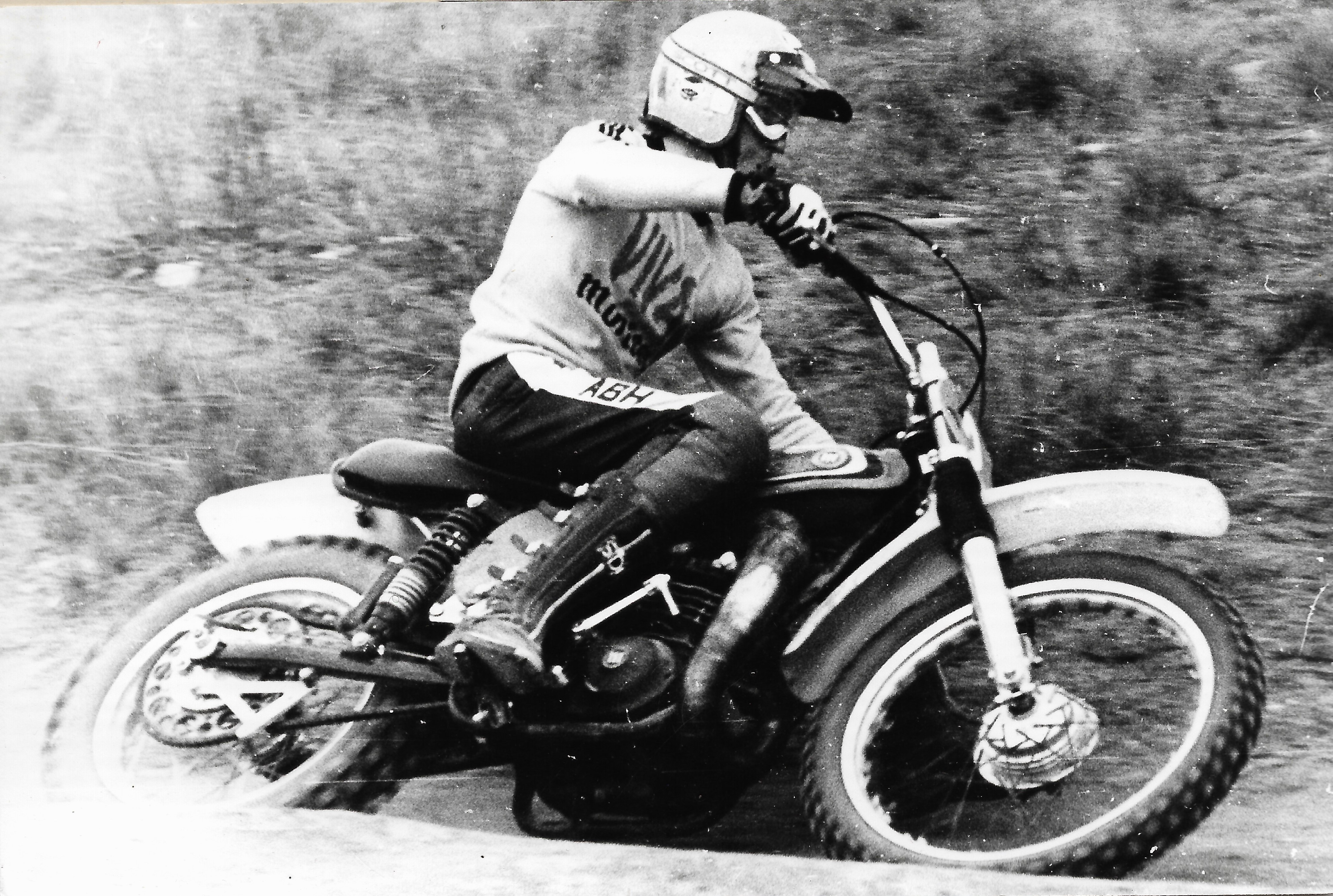
Hakan Andersson on a Montesa Cappra 250 in 1976

Andersson suffered a serious back injury at the beginning of the 1974 season but came back late in the year to post a series of second place results to finish the season ranked sixth in the 250cc World Championship. He was also part of a Swedish victory at the 1974 Motocross of Nations for the first time in his career. 1974 would mark the last year that Sweden was the Motocross des Nations Champion.

Andersson continued to be competitive in the 1975 250cc World Championship, however he would finish the season ranked second to Puch factory rider Harry Everts who rode a motorcycle which featured an innovative twin carburetor system. It marked the third time in his racing career that Anderson was the 250cc class Vice-Champion.

=== Later career ===
In the wake of the 1973 oil crisis, sales of recreational vehicles decreased significantly, and Yamaha was forced to reduce their competition budget by withdrawing their motocross and road racing teams after the 1975 season. As all the other major motorcycle manufacturers had already signed their racers for the 1976 season, Andersson signed a contract to compete for the small, Spanish Montesa factory in the 250 class. In 1977, he rode a Montesa in the 500cc class. He returned to Husqvarna in the 1978 and 1979 seasons in the 500cc class. Andersson was the top individual points scorer at the 1977 Motocross des Nations event.

Andersson retired from motocross competitions in 1979 at the age of 34. Andersson won 22 individual heat races and 10 Grand Prix victories during his world championship racing career. He won one 250cc Motocross World Championship (1973) and was a three-time 250cc class Vice Champion (1971, 1972, 1975). He won three 250cc Swedish Motocross Championships (1971, 1972, 1974) and three 500cc Swedish national motocross championships (1977-1979). He was a member of the victorious Swedish Trophée des Nations team in 1967, and the victorious Swedish Motocross des Nations team in 1974.

In retirement, Andersson continued to support his local Uddevalla motocross club, including helping to organize a Swedish round of the Motocross World Championships.

== Motocross Grand Prix Results ==
Points system from 1952 to 1968:

Position	1st	2nd	3rd	4th	5th	6th
Points	8	6	4	3	2	1

Points system from 1969 to 1980:

Position	1	2	3	4	5	6	7	8	9	10
Points	15	12	10	8	6	5	4	3	2	1

Year	Class	Team	1		2		3		4		5		6		7		8		9		10		11		12		13		14		15		Pos	Pts
Year	Class	Team	R1	R2	R1	R2	R1	R2	R1	R2	R1	R2	R1	R2	R1	R2	R1	R2	R1	R2	R1	R2	R1	R2	R1	R2	R1	R2	R1	R2	R1	R2	Pos	Pts
1966	250cc	Husqvarna	ESP -	ESP -	FRA -	FRA -	BEL -	BEL -	CH -	CH -	CZE -	CZE -	GER -	GER -	NED -	NED -	LUX -	LUX -	ITA -	ITA -	POL -	POL -	GDR -	GDR -	SWE; 3	SWE -	FIN -	FIN -	USR -	USR -	AUT -	AUT -	-	0
1967	250cc	Husqvarna	ESP -	ESP -	CH -	CH -	FRA -	FRA -	BEL -	BEL -	GER -	GER -	NED -	NED -	ITA -	ITA -	UK; 5	UK; 5	SWE; 3	SWE; 3	FIN; 3	FIN; 3	USR; 6	USR -	POL -	POL -							6th	13
1968	250cc	Husqvarna	ESP -	ESP; 2	BEL; 3	BEL; 1	CZE; 1	CZE; 1	FRA; 3	FRA; 1	NED; 4	NED; 26	GER -	GER -	LUX -	LUX -	POL -	POL -	USR -	USR -	YUG -	YUG -	FIN -	FIN -	SWE -	SWE -	UK -	UK -	AUT -	AUT -			6th	18
1970	250cc	Husqvarna	ESP -	ESP -	FRA; 9	FRA; 8	BEL -	BEL -	YUG; 6	YUG; 13	ITA -	ITA -	USR -	USR -	POL -	POL -	UK -	UK -	FIN; 9	FIN; 8	GDR -	GDR -	CH -	CH -	AUT; 17	AUT; 7							13th	12
1971	250cc	Husqvarna	ESP; 5	ESP; 3	CH; 9	CH; 8	POL; 5	POL; 2	GER; 6	GER; 3	YUG -	YUG -	ITA; 5	ITA; 9	NED -	NED -	GDR; 2	GDR; 3	FIN; 3	FIN; 3	SWE; 3	SWE; 2	UK; 5	UK; 4	AUT; 1	AUT -							2nd	72
1972	250cc	Yamaha	ESP -	ESP -	FRA -	FRA -	NED -	NED -	CZE; 3	CZE; 8	YUG; 7	YUG -	GER; 4	GER; 6	POL; 3	POL; 5	USR; 6	USR; 4	FIN; 4	FIN; 3	SWE; 2	SWE; 1	UK; 5	UK; 1	CH; 3	CH; 2							2nd	82
1973	250cc	Yamaha	ESP; 6	ESP; 2	ITA; 3	ITA; 6	BEL; 2	BEL; 1	CH; 1	CH; 1	POL; 1	POL; 1	YUG -	YUG; 1	FRA; 2	FRA; 1	FIN; 1	FIN; 1	USR -	USR -	SWE; 1	SWE; 1	AUT; 4	AUT -									1st	177
1974	250cc	Yamaha	ESP; 3	ESP; 4	ITA; 4	ITA -	CZE -	CZE -	POL -	POL -	YUG -	YUG -	UK -	UK -	GER -	GER -	NED -	NED; 6	FIN; 3	FIN; 2	SWE; 2	SWE; 2	CH; 2	CH -									6th	81
1975	250cc	Yamaha	ESP; 1	ESP -	AUT -	AUT; 9	BEL; 9	BEL; 1	CZE -	CZE; 9	POL; 2	POL; 5	YUG -	YUG; 6	GER -	GER; 3	UK; 5	UK; 1	FRA -	FRA; 2	SWE -	SWE; 6	FIN -	FIN; 1	CH; 3	CH; 4							2nd	134
1976	250cc	Montesa	ESP; 5	ESP -	BEL; 4	BEL -	CZE; 8	CZE -	POL -	POL; 3	USR; 5	USR -	YUG; 3	YUG; 5	ITA; 7	ITA -	FRA -	FRA -	UK -	UK -	GER -	GER -	NED -	NED -	SWE; 10	SWE -							10th	54
1977	500cc	Montesa	AUT -	AUT -	NED -	NED -	SWE; 9	SWE; 4	FIN; 6	FIN; 8	GER -	GER; 4	ITA -	ITA -	USA -	USA -	CAN; 6	CAN; 9	UK; 5	UK; 6	BEL; 7	BEL; 6	LUX; 5	LUX; 4	CH; 3	CH; 4							5th	85
1978	500cc	Husqvarna	CH; 8	CH; 9	AUT -	AUT -	FRA; 5	FRA; 3	DEN; 8	DEN -	FIN -	FIN -	SWE -	SWE -	USA -	USA -	ITA -	ITA; 5	UK -	UK; 9	BEL -	BEL -	LUX; 8	LUX -	NED -	NED; 10							12th	36
1979	500cc	Husqvarna	AUT -	AUT -	FRA -	FRA -	SWE; 9	SWE -	ITA -	ITA -	USA -	USA -	CAN -	CAN -	GER -	GER -	UK -	UK -	CH -	CH -	NED -	NED -	BEL; 7	BEL -	LUX; 7	LUX; 5							15th	16
