= 1974 FIM Motocross World Championship =

Motocross championship season

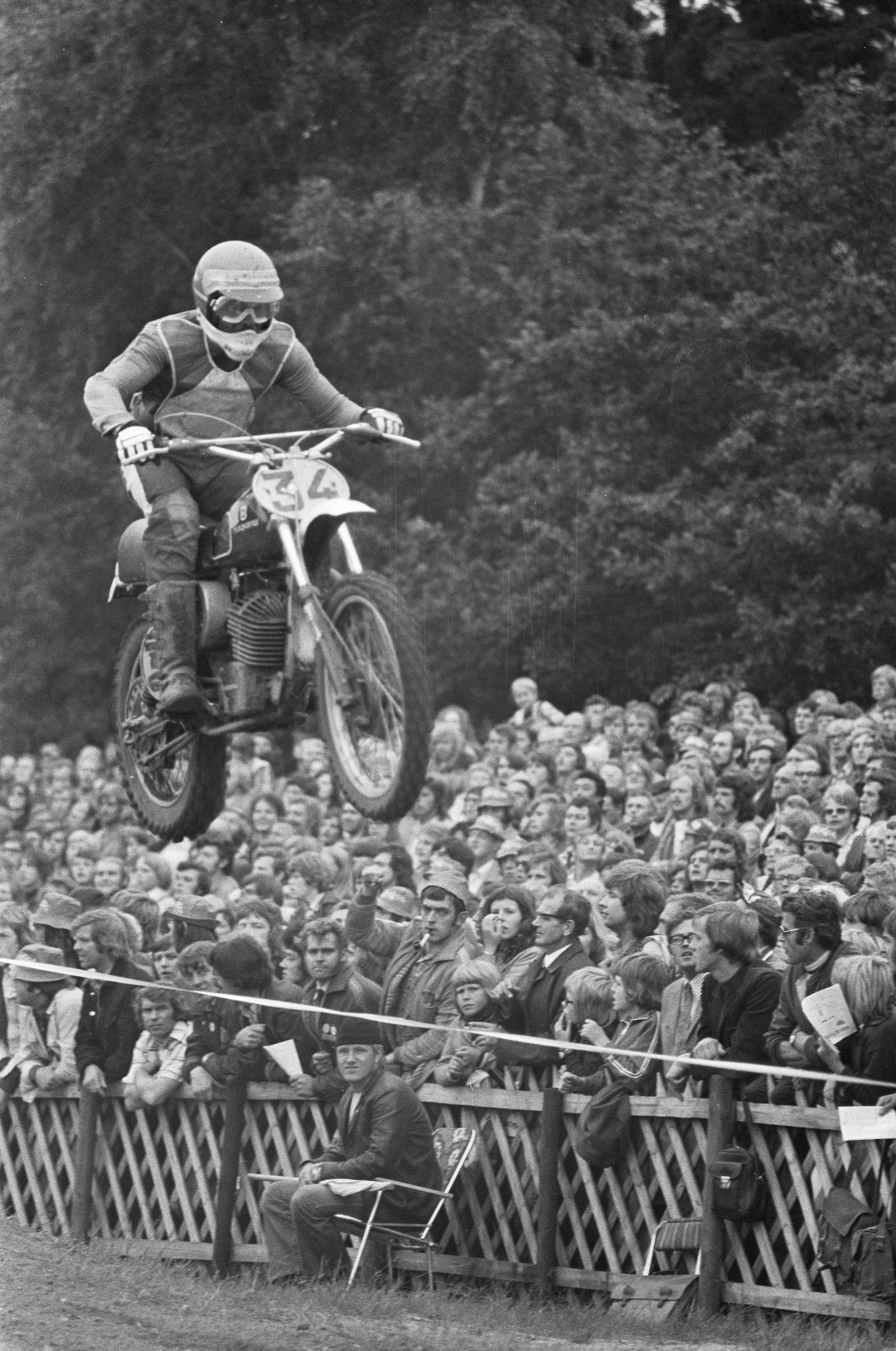
- 1974 500cc World Champion Heikki Mikkola in action during the 1974 500cc Dutch Grand Prix on 28 July 1974.
- Organizer: FIM
- Duration: 7 April/25 August
- Races: 22
- Manufacturers: 12

Champions
- 500cc: (Finland) Heikki Mikkola
- 250cc: (Soviet Union) Gennady Moiseyev

FIM Motocross World Championship
- ← 1973 1975 →

The 1974 FIM Motocross World Championship was the 18th edition of the Motocross World Championship organized by the FIM and reserved for 500cc and 250cc motorcycles.

== Summary ==
Heikki Mikkola claimed his first 500cc world championship in a season-long battle with four-time world champion Roger De Coster that was not decided until the final Grand Prix of the season. The 250cc world championship ended in controversy as Russian riders used questionable riding tactics to secure the championship for Gennady Moiseyev over Jaroslav Falta. In a sign of the sport's growing popularity, the 500cc United States Motocross Grand Prix is added to the calendar in 1974, marking the first time a World Championship Motocross event would be hosted outside of Europe or Great Britain.

=== 500cc Class ===
Mikkola and De Coster dominated the series winning 17 of the 22 races as they competed for the premier division in motocross racing. Suzuki hired former privateer, Gerrit Wolsink to be De Coster's teammate. Former world champion, Bengt Åberg, left Husqvarna to join the Bultaco factory racing team. Brad Lackey replaced the departed Åberg, joining Mikkola and Arne Kring on the Husqvarna team while, Christer Hammargren left Husqvarna to replace Lackey on the Kawasaki team. Maico returned with the 1973 500cc championship runner-up, Willy Bauer and 35-year-old Adolf Weil, while the Yamaha team was represented by Jaak van Velthoven and Åke Jonsson.

The season began at the Austrian Grand Prix where Husqvarna's Mikkola won both races while De Coster's Suzuki had engine problems in the first race then suffered a flat tire in the second moto. Mikkola continued his winning streak with two more victories at the French Grand Prix, relegating De Coster to second in both races. Mikkola won a fifth consecutive moto at the Danish Grand Prix while De Coster retired, DNF (did not finish) with a loose exhaust pipe.

De Coster scored his first moto win with a second moto victory in Denmark, holding Mikkola to second place. In the Czechoslovak Grand Prix, Mikkola won the first race and, was leading the second race when it began to rain, and he crashed three times. De Coster won the victory. At the halfway point of the season, Mikkola and De Coster had accounted for all of the race wins with Mikkola winning 7 motos and De Coster's 3 wins.

At the German Grand Prix, Mikkola injured his ribs during practice and missed the race, allowing Maico rider, Adolf Weil to finally break the monopoly with a win in the first race at his home Grand Prix while De Coster finished in fourth place. A malfunctioning front brake caused De Coster to crash in the second race (he was out in the 1975 season after hitting a tree) while his Suzuki teammate, Gerrit Wolsink took the win. Three weeks later at the British Grand Prix, Mikkola was back in action however, a bent brake pedal in a first turn crash forced him out of the race. De Coster was leading the race when his rear suspension broke and led to his retirement, allowing Yamaha rider Jaak van Velthoven to claim the victory. De Coster came back to win the second race while Mikkola once again was involved in a first turn crash with Weil putting him in last place. In a display of determination, Mikkola fought his way through the pack and into third place after 10 laps.

The series then crossed the Atlantic for the United States Grand Prix with Mikkola holding a 25-point lead in the standings. De Coster led five races, DNFing each due to damaged hardware. In the first moto, Wolsink held the lead before being passed by his teammate De Coster and collect maximum championship points three laps from the finish. Mikkola rode the last four laps with a flat tire to salvage a fourth-place finish. De Coster was hindered by a damaged front wheel hub in the second race while his teammate Wolsink barely held off a charging Mikkola to win the race by a one-foot margin and deny Mikkola valuable championship points. An exhausted Wolsink collapsed from his bike immediately after crossing the finish line.

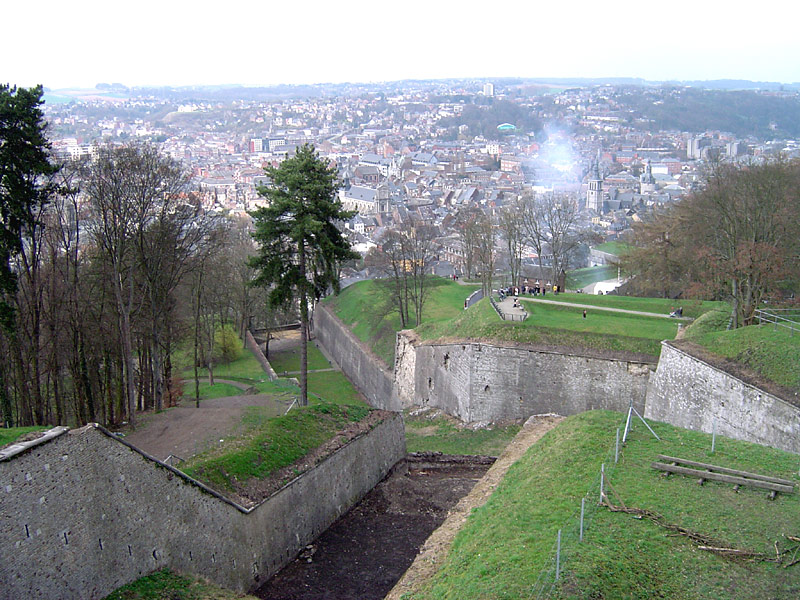
Citadel of Namur with track visible to far left

Back in Europe for the Dutch Grand Prix, Mikkola and De Coster traded moto wins in the exhausting deep, sand track at Markelo. Going into the final two events of the season, Mikkola held a 10-point lead meaning that De Coster would have to win three of the last four motos to secure his fifth consecutive 500cc world championship.

The setting of the Belgian Grand Prix was a rugged, narrow track in the forests surrounding the picturesque hilltop Citadel of Namur. First held in 1947, the Namur circuit was known as the Monaco of the motocross grand prix circuit in reference to the prestigious Formula One race.

Wolsink took the lead at the start of the first race while Mikkola and De Coster battled their way to the front of the pack. When Wolsink's engine seized, the two series points leaders once again found themselves first and second with Mikkola holding on to the lead to the end of the race. De Coster had to win the final three races to overtake Mikkola for the championship. Wolsink once again grabbed the early lead in the second race but, soon crashed allowing De Coster into the lead with Mikkola in second place. De Coster continued to widen his lead to win the second moto to extend the championship points battle to the final race of the season in Luxembourg. In the first race, De Coster worked his way through the pack to take the lead before his Suzuki RN crashed into a tree, forcing him out of the race. Mikkola took over the lead and won the race to clinch his first world championship.

De Coster's Suzuki suffered mechanical breakdowns while he was leading five races, Mikkola's Husqvarna showed a perfect mechanical reliability by finishing every race. Mikkola credited much of his success to his Husqvarna factory mechanic, Per-Olaf Persson, whose meticulous preparation and maintenance greatly improved the reliability of his motorcycle.

=== 250cc Class ===
The 250cc championship was a battle between Soviet KTM rider Gennady Moiseyev and Czech ČZ rider Jaroslav Falta which ended in controversy at the final race of the season. Moiseyev won the first moto and took the overall victory at the season opening Spanish Grand Prix. Falta won both races at the Italian Grand Prix followed with a win in the first moto of his home Grand Prix in Czechoslovakia but, then suffered two breakdowns in Poland while Moiseyev won both races. Falta won a moto in Yugoslavia and at the halfway point of the season, he trailed the Russian rider by 20 points. Each rider took a second place at the West German Grand Prix but, Falta won a moto at the Dutch Grand Prix to close the points gap to 5 points going into the final race of the season in Switzerland.

Falta took the lead in the first race and appeared to be heading for victory while Moiseyev was being slowed by a rear suspension failure. When Falta came upon the slowing Russian rider and tried to pass him, the KTM rider made an attempt to obstruct him allowing second and third place riders, Harry Everts and Håkan Andersson to catch up. When Falta attempted to pass Moiseyev, the Russian rider collided with him causing him to fall off his bike. Falta was quickly able to remount but, finished the race in third place. Falta had to win the final moto to have any chance to claim the world championship.

As the final race began, Falta once again jumped into the lead while Moiseyev was forced to retire on the seventh lap. When Falta came upon two Russian riders, Victor Popenko and Eugeny Rybaltchenko, they appeared to attempt to block him. As Falta tried to pass them, Rybaltchenko rode into him, knocking him down. He remounted in third place as race officials waved the black flag at the two Russian riders, disqualifying them from the race. Falta was able to catch up and pass Everts and Gaston Rahier to recapture the lead and win the race, apparently clinching the world championship. However two hours after the conclusion of the race, jury officials penalized Falta one minute for jumping the start which dropped him to eighth place handing the world championship to Moiseyev.

== Grands Prix ==
=== 500cc ===
Round	Date	Grand Prix	Location	Race 1 Winner	Race 2 Winner	Overall Winner	Report
1	21 April	(Austria) Austrian Grand Prix	Sittendorf	(Finland) Heikki Mikkola	(Finland) Heikki Mikkola	(Finland) Heikki Mikkola	Report
2	5 May	(France) French Grand Prix	Gaillefontaine	(Finland) Heikki Mikkola	(Finland) Heikki Mikkola	(Finland) Heikki Mikkola	Report
3	26 May	(Italy) Italian Grand Prix	Esanatoglia	(Finland) Heikki Mikkola	(Belgium) Roger De Coster	(Finland) Heikki Mikkola	Report
4	3 June	(Denmark) Danish Grand Prix	Nissebjerget	(Finland) Heikki Mikkola	(Belgium) Roger De Coster	(Finland) Heikki Mikkola	Report
5	9 June	(Czechoslovakia) Czechoslovak Grand Prix	Přerov	(Finland) Heikki Mikkola	(Belgium) Roger De Coster	(Belgium) Roger De Coster	Report
6	16 June	(Germany) West German Grand Prix	Beuren	(Germany) Adolf Weil	(Netherlands) Gerrit Wolsink	(Germany) Adolf Weil	Report
7	7 July	(United Kingdom) British Grand Prix	Dodington Park	(Belgium) Jaak van Velthoven	(Belgium) Roger De Coster	(Belgium) Jaak van Velthoven	Report
8	14 July	United States Grand Prix	Carlsbad	(Belgium) Roger De Coster	(Netherlands) Gerrit Wolsink	(Netherlands) Gerrit Wolsink	Report
9	28 July	(Netherlands) Dutch Grand Prix	Markelo	(Finland) Heikki Mikkola	(Belgium) Roger De Coster	(Belgium) Roger De Coster	Report
10	4 August	(Belgium) Belgian Grand Prix	Namur	(Finland) Heikki Mikkola	(Belgium) Roger De Coster	(Belgium) Roger De Coster	Report
11	11 August	Luxembourg Grand Prix	Ettelbruck	(Finland) Heikki Mikkola	(Sweden) Bengt Åberg	(Belgium) Jaak van Velthoven	Report

=== 250cc ===
Round	Date	Grand Prix	Location	Race 1 Winner	Race 2 Winner	Overall Winner	Report
1	7 April	(Spain) Spanish Grand Prix	Sabadell	(Belgium) Raymond Boven	(Soviet Union) Gennady Moiseyev	(Soviet Union) Gennady Moiseyev	Report
2	21 April	(Italy) Italian Grand Prix	Gallarate	(Czech Republic) Jaroslav Falta	(Czech Republic) Jaroslav Falta	(Czech Republic) Jaroslav Falta	Report
3	5 May	(Czechoslovakia) Czechoslovak Grand Prix	Holice	(Czech Republic) Jiří Churavý	(Czech Republic) Jaroslav Falta	(Czech Republic) Miroslav Halm	Report
4	12 May	(Poland) Polish Grand Prix	Szczecin	(Soviet Union) Gennady Moiseyev	(Soviet Union) Gennady Moiseyev	(Soviet Union) Gennady Moiseyev	Report
5	19 May	(Socialist Federal Republic of Yugoslavia) Yugoslavian Grand Prix	Karlovac	(Sweden) Torleif Hansen	(Czech Republic) Jaroslav Falta	(Sweden) Torleif Hansen	Report
6	2 June	(United Kingdom) British Grand Prix	Portsmouth-Charlton	(Belgium) Harry Everts	(Sweden) Torleif Hansen	(Sweden) Torleif Hansen	Report
7	9 June	(Germany) West German Grand Prix	Bielstein	(Belgium) Gaston Rahier	(Belgium) Joël Robert	(Belgium) Gaston Rahier	Report
8	16 June	(Netherlands) Dutch Grand Prix	Valkenswaard	(Belgium) Sylvain Geboers	(Czech Republic) Jaroslav Falta	(Belgium) Sylvain Geboers	Report
9	4 August	(Finland) Finnish Grand Prix	Hyvinkää	(Belgium) Harry Everts	(Soviet Union) Gennady Moiseyev	(Belgium) Harry Everts	Report
10	11 August	(Sweden) Swedish Grand Prix	Upplands Väsby	(Sweden) Torleif Hansen	(Soviet Union) Gennady Moiseyev	(Sweden) Torleif Hansen	Report
11	25 August	(Switzerland) Swiss Grand Prix	Wohlen	(Belgium) Harry Everts	(Belgium) Harry Everts	(Belgium) Harry Everts	Report

== Final standings ==
Points are awarded based on the results of each individual heat race. The top 10 classified finishers in each heat race score points according to the following scale;

Position	1st	2nd	3rd	4th	5th	6th	7th	8th	9th	10th
Points	15	12	10	8	6	5	4	3	2	1

=== 500cc ===
(Results in italics indicate overall winner)

Pos	Rider	Machine	AUT (Austria)		FRA (France)		ITA (Italy)		DEN (Denmark)		CZE (Czech Republic)		GER (Germany)		GBR (United Kingdom)		USA (United States)		NED (Netherlands)		BEL (Belgium)		LUX (Luxembourg)		Points
1	(Finland) Heikki Mikkola	Husqvarna	1	1	1	1	1	2	1	2	1		DNS	DNS		3	4	2	1		1	2	1	6	174
2	(Belgium) Roger De Coster	Suzuki		9	2	2		1		1	2	1	3	5		1	1	3	3	1	2	1		2	165
3	(Germany) Adolf Weil	Maico	2	2		7	3		2	6	3	2	1	2	3		7	6	5			3	3	4	133
4	(Netherlands) Gerrit Wolsink	Suzuki	8	5	9	4		4	4	5	4	5	4	1	2		2	1	2	2					124
5	(Belgium) Jaak van Velthoven	Yamaha	10		5	5	5	5	3		10				1	2	3	5	4			4	2	3	109
6	(Germany) Willy Bauer	Maico / ČZ	3	3	6	6	6		5		6	3	2	3		5		9		7					88
7	(Sweden) Åke Jonsson	Yamaha	5	6	7		2	7	6		5	4	6	4	5	8	9		6	4	3	6	6	5	85
8	(Sweden) Arne Kring	Husqvarna	7	7	3	8			7	3			7		4	4			7	3	4	5		7	80
9	(Sweden) Bengt Åberg	Bultaco	4	4			4	8	8		8		5	6	9	6	8	10						1	69
10	(United States) Brad Lackey	Husqvarna			10	9		3		4		8	8	7	7	7	5			5		7	8	9	57
11	(Czech Republic) Otakar Toman	ČZ	6	8	4		8	6			7														28
12	(Denmark) Arne Lodal	Maico							10	8						10			10	8	5	9			17
13	(Soviet Union) Victor Popenko	ČZ			8	3			9																15
14	(Netherlands) Pierre Karsmakers	Yamaha															6	4							13
15	(United Kingdom) John Banks	CCM								7				8									5		13
16	(Soviet Union) Anatoly Botchkov	ČZ				10						6			6										11
17	(Sweden) Christer Hammargren	Kawasaki										10											4		9
18	(Belgium) Raymond Heeren	Maico																					7	8	7
19	(Italy) Paolo Piron	Husqvarna					7	9																	6
19	(France) Serge Bacou	Maico								10			9	10	10								10		6
21	(Finland) Pauli Piippola	ČZ																		6					5
21	(Belgium) Julien de Roover	ČZ																			6				5
23	(United States) Jimmy Weinert	Kawasaki															10	7							5
23	(Belgium) André Massant	Yamaha																			7	10			5
25	(Belgium) Gilbert de Roover	Husqvarna																		9	8				5
25	(United Kingdom) Andy Roberton	Husqvarna/CCM													8	9									5
25	(France) Daniel Péan	Maico																			9	8			5
28	(United Kingdom) Vic Eastwood	Maico								9			10	9											5
29	(Soviet Union) Vladimir Khudiakov	ČZ					10													10			9	10	4
30	(Czech Republic) Jiří Ondryas	ČZ										7													4
30	(Netherlands) Frans Sigmans	Maico																	8		10				4
32	(Czech Republic) Zdeněk Strnad	ČZ									9	9													4
33	(United States) Marty Tripes	Husqvarna																8							3
34	(Sweden) Arne Lindfors	Maico	9	10																					3
35	(Belgium) Jean-Paul Mingels	Bultaco					9																		2
35	(Netherlands) Toon Karsmakers	Husqvarna																	9						2
37	(Italy) Ivano Bessone	ČZ						10																	1

=== 250cc ===
(Results in italics indicate overall winner)

Pos	Rider	Machine	ESP (Spain)		ITA (Italy)		CZE (Czech Republic)		POL (Poland)		YUG (Socialist Federal Republic of Yugoslavia)		GBR (United Kingdom)		GER (Germany)		NED (Netherlands)		FIN (Finland)		SWE (Sweden)		CH (Switzerland)		Points
1	(Soviet Union) Gennady Moiseyev	KTM	4	1		2	6		1	1		2	3	3	2		6	5	10	1	5	1			145
2	(Czech Republic) Jaroslav Falta	ČZ		3	1	1		1				1	4	7		2		1	2			4	3	8	139
3	(Belgium) Harry Everts	Puch	6	2	3	7		4	4		7		1	4	10	5	3	4	1	4	4		1	1	132
4	(Sweden) Torleif Hansen	Kawasaki					4				1	3	2	1			5				1	3		3	101
5	(Belgium) Gaston Rahier	Suzuki	10			4	8	8	2	2	4		10		1	3	4		9		8	9	5	4	96
6	(Sweden) Håkan Andersson	Yamaha	3	4														6	3	2	2	2	2		81
7	(Soviet Union) Pavel Rulev	KTM	2	6			3	9	3	10	3	6	6	5								7	6		75
8	(Czech Republic) Miroslav Halm	ČZ					5	2		3	2	4	8		9	7	10		7		7		7		70
9	(West Germany) Hans Maisch	Maico	9	5	2				6	5	5			2									4	2	69
10	(Belgium) Joël Robert	Suzuki	5	9	4				7				9		4	1					3	8			58
11	(Belgium) Sylvain Geboers	Suzuki		7					5						3	8	1	2					8		53
12	(Belgium) Raymond Boven	Montesa	1			5		7	10					6	5		2								49
13	(Japan) Torao Suzuki	Yamaha			5											6		3	4	6	6	5			45
14	(United States) Jim Pomeroy	Bultaco	7	10			7	3											8	3		6		7	41
15	(United Kingdom) Vic Allan	Bultaco		8			9	5		4			5			4									33
16	(West Germany) Herbert Schmitz	Puch	8		6	6		6	8					8			9	10	6		10				33
17	(Finland) Kalevi Vehkonen	Husqvarna								9	9	5			6				5				9	6	28
18	(Czech Republic) Jiří Churavý	ČZ					1			6										5					26
19	(Czech Republic) Zdeněk Velký	ČZ			8	3										9							10	5	22
20	(Soviet Union) Evgeniy Rybalchenko	ČZ			7	8			9		6							8							17
21	(Belgium) Jean-Claude Laquaye	Yamaha			10	10					8	8			7		8								15
22	(Czech Republic) Antonin Baborowsky	ČZ					2					10													13
23	(Netherlands) Jo Lammers	Bultaco								7								7		7					12
24	(Sweden) Olle Pettersson	Kawasaki								8						10	7	9		10					11
25	(Sweden) Håkan Carlqvist	Ossa													8					8		10			7
26	(Soviet Union) Anatoly Ovchinnikov	ČZ					10				10	7													6
27	(United Kingdom) Malcolm Davis	Bultaco											7												4
28	(Italy) Alessandro Gritti	KTM			9	9																			4
28	(Belgium) Claude Jobe	Montesa										9		9											4
30	(Finland) Erkki Sundström	Husqvarna																		9					2
30	(Sweden) Uno Palm	Husqvarna																			9				2
30	(Switzerland) Max Bunter	KTM																						9	2
33	(Czech Republic) Josef Festa	ČZ						10																	1
33	(France) Jean-Claude Nowak	Montesa												10											1
33	(Switzerland) René Rossy	KTM																						10	1

== See also ==
- 1974 AMA Motocross National Championship season
- 1974 Trans-AMA motocross series
