= 1978 FIM Motocross World Championship =

Motocross championship season

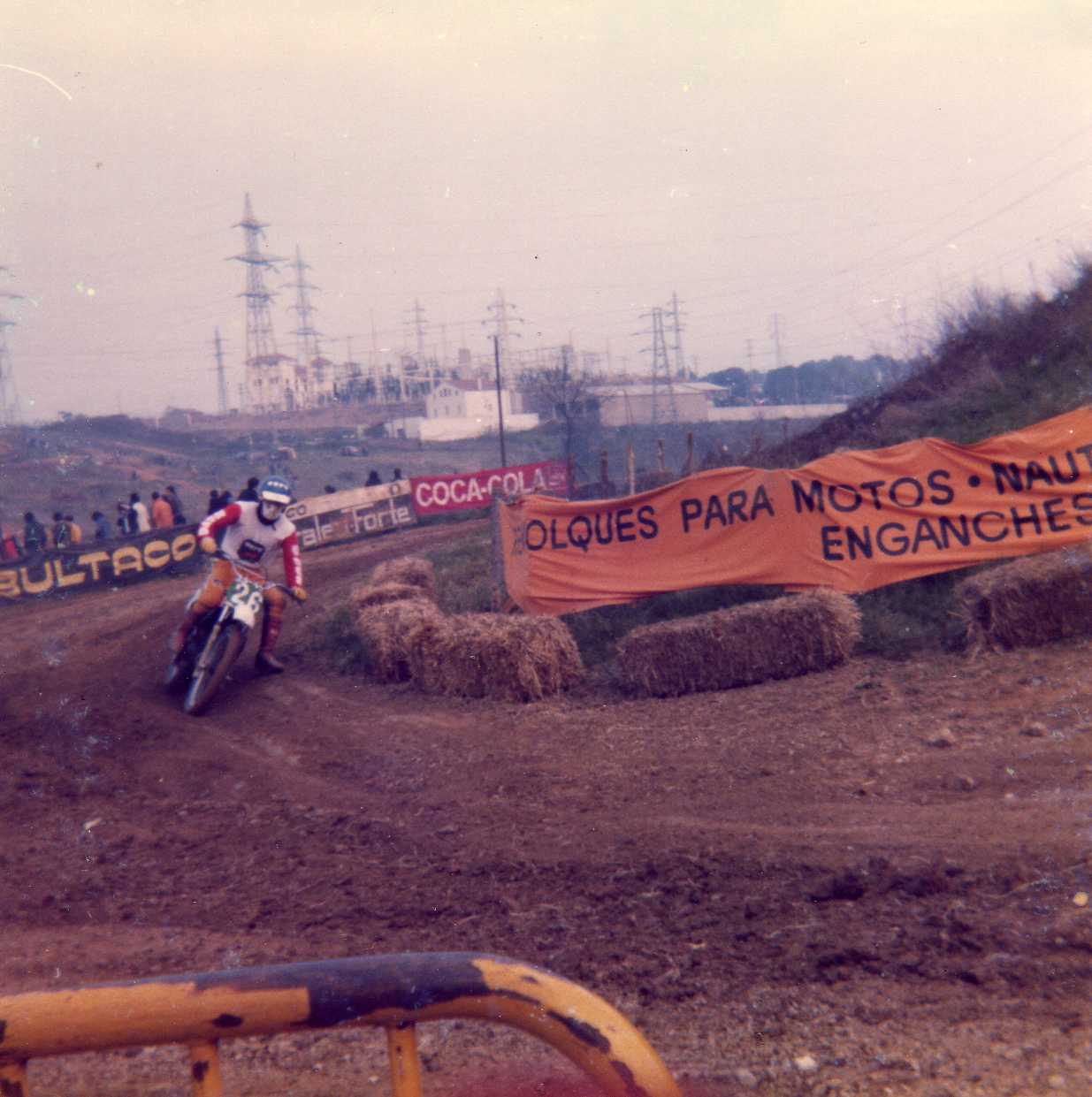
- Fernando Muñoz at the 1978 250cc Spanish Grand Prix
- Organizer: FIM
- Duration: 9 April/27 August
- Number of races: 36
- Number of manufacturers: 18

Champions
- 500cc: (Finland) Heikki Mikkola
- 250cc: (Soviet Union) Gennady Moiseyev
- 125cc: (Japan) Akira Watanabe

FIM Motocross World Championship
- ← 1977 1979 →

The 1978 FIM Motocross World Championship was the 22nd F.I.M. Motocross Racing World Championship season.

== Summary ==
Heikki Mikkola successfully defended his 500cc world championship for Yamaha, finishing ahead of Honda's Brad Lackey. Mikkola dominated the season with 14 moto victories in 24 outings. Roger De Coster had a serious accident during pre-season training and ended up having his spleen removed but, recovered to finish the season in third place.

Gennady Moiseyev was also successful in defending his 250cc title. In the battle for second place, Torleif Hansen, Hans Maisch and Vladimir Kavinov all finish within 1 point of each other. In the 125cc championship, Akira Watanabe ended the three-year reign of his Suzuki teammate, Gaston Rahier. Watanabe's championship marks the first and only motocross world championship for a Japanese competitor. Gérard Rond won four Grand Prix overall victories for Yamaha and finished in third place, one point behind Rahier.

== Grands Prix ==
=== 500cc ===
Round	Date	Grand Prix	Location	Race 1 Winner	Race 2 Winner	Overall Winner	Report
1	April 9	(Switzerland) Swiss Grand Prix	Payerne	(Finland) Heikki Mikkola	(Finland) Heikki Mikkola	(Finland) Heikki Mikkola	Report
2	April 16	(Austria) Austrian Grand Prix	Sittendorf	(United States) Brad Lackey	(Belgium) Roger De Coster	(United States) Brad Lackey	Report
3	April 30	(France) French Grand Prix	Gaillefontaine	(United States) Brad Lackey	(Finland) Heikki Mikkola	(Finland) Heikki Mikkola	Report
4	May 7	(Denmark) Danish Grand Prix	Næstved	(Finland) Heikki Mikkola	(Finland) Heikki Mikkola	(Finland) Heikki Mikkola	Report
5	May 21	(Finland) Finnish Grand Prix	Ruskeasanta	(Finland) Heikki Mikkola	(Finland) Heikki Mikkola	(Finland) Heikki Mikkola	Report
6	May 28	(Sweden) Swedish Grand Prix	Västerås	(West Germany) Herbert Schmitz	(Finland) Heikki Mikkola	(Belgium) Roger De Coster	Report
7	June 4	United States Grand Prix	Carlsbad	(West Germany) Herbert Schmitz	(Finland) Heikki Mikkola	(Finland) Heikki Mikkola	Report
8	June 11	(Italy) Italian Grand Prix	Gallarate	(United States) Brad Lackey	(Finland) Heikki Mikkola	(Finland) Heikki Mikkola	Report
9	July 2	(United Kingdom) British Grand Prix	Farleigh Castle	(Finland) Heikki Mikkola	(United States) Brad Lackey	(United States) Brad Lackey	Report
10	August 6	(Belgium) Belgian Grand Prix	Namur	(Finland) Heikki Mikkola	(Finland) Heikki Mikkola	(Finland) Heikki Mikkola	Report
11	August 13	Luxembourg Grand Prix	Ettelbruck	(Belgium) Roger De Coster	(Finland) Heikki Mikkola	(Finland) Heikki Mikkola	Report
12	August 27	(Netherlands) Dutch Grand Prix	Sint Anthonis	(Netherlands) Gerrit Wolsink	(Netherlands) Gerrit Wolsink	(Netherlands) Gerrit Wolsink	Report

=== 250cc ===
Round	Date	Grand Prix	Location	Race 1 Winner	Race 2 Winner	Overall Winner	Report
1	April 9	(Spain) Spanish Grand Prix	Sabadell	(Belgium) Harry Everts	(Sweden) Håkan Carlqvist	(Belgium) Harry Everts	Report
2	May 7	(Italy) Italian Grand Prix	Serramazzoni	(West Germany) Hans Maisch	(Soviet Union) Gennady Moiseyev	(West Germany) Fritz Schneider	Report
3	May 21	(Czech Republic) Czechoslovak Grand Prix	Holice	(Sweden) Torleif Hansen	(Soviet Union) Vladimir Kavinov	(Sweden) Torleif Hansen	Report
4	May 28	(Socialist Federal Republic of Yugoslavia) Yugoslavian Grand Prix	Tržič	(Sweden) Torleif Hansen	(Soviet Union) Gennady Moiseyev	(Sweden) Torleif Hansen	Report
5	June 4	(Austria) Austrian Grand Prix	Schwanenstadt	(Czech Republic) Jaroslav Falta	(West Germany) Hans Maisch	(Czech Republic) Jaroslav Falta	Report
6	June 11	(West Germany) West German Grand Prix	Beuern	(West Germany) Hans Maisch	(Belgium) Harry Everts	(Sweden) Torleif Hansen	Report
7	June 18	(United Kingdom) British Grand Prix	Kilmartin	(Soviet Union) Gennady Moiseyev	(Soviet Union) Gennady Moiseyev	(Soviet Union) Gennady Moiseyev	Report
8	July 2	(France) French Grand Prix	Ahun	(Soviet Union) Vladimir Kavinov	(Soviet Union) Vladimir Kavinov	(Soviet Union) Vladimir Kavinov	Report
9	July 30	United States Grand Prix	Unadilla	(United States) Jimmy Ellis	(United States) Bob Hannah	(United States) Marty Tripes	Report
10	August 13	(Sweden) Swedish Grand Prix	Barkarby	(Soviet Union) Gennady Moiseyev	(Soviet Union) Vladimir Kavinov	(United Kingdom) Neil Hudson	Report
11	August 20	(Finland) Finnish Grand Prix	Hyvinkää	(Sweden) Torleif Hansen	(Soviet Union) Vladimir Kavinov	(Sweden) Torleif Hansen	Report
12	August 27	(Soviet Union) Russian Grand Prix	Leningrad	(Soviet Union) Gennady Moiseyev	(Sweden) Torleif Hansen	(Sweden) Torleif Hansen	Report

=== 125cc ===
Round	Date	Grand Prix	Location	Race 1 Winner	Race 2 Winner	Overall Winner	Report
1	April 9	(Austria) Austrian Grand Prix	Launsdorf	(Belgium) Gaston Rahier	(Belgium) Gaston Rahier	(Belgium) Gaston Rahier	Report
2	April 16	(Italy) Italian Grand Prix	San Severino	(Belgium) Gaston Rahier	(Japan) Akira Watanabe	(Belgium) Gaston Rahier	Report
3	April 23	(Belgium) Belgian Grand Prix	Lanklaar-Dilsen	(Netherlands) Gérard Rond	(Netherlands) Gérard Rond	(Netherlands) Gérard Rond	Report
4	April 30	(Netherlands) Dutch Grand Prix	Apeldoorn	(Netherlands) Gérard Rond	(Netherlands) Gérard Rond	(Netherlands) Gérard Rond	Report
5	May 7	(France) French Grand Prix	Vesoul	(Belgium) Gaston Rahier	(Belgium) Gaston Rahier	(Belgium) Gaston Rahier	Report
6	May 21	(Socialist Federal Republic of Yugoslavia) Yugoslavian Grand Prix	Orehova vas	(Netherlands) Gérard Rond	(Japan) Akira Watanabe	(Netherlands) Gérard Rond	Report
7	May 28	(West Germany) West German Grand Prix	Laubus-Eschbach	(Belgium) Gaston Rahier	(Japan) Akira Watanabe	(Japan) Akira Watanabe	Report
8	June 4	(Switzerland) Swiss Grand Prix	Meyrin	(Japan) Akira Watanabe	(Netherlands) Gérard Rond	(Netherlands) Gérard Rond	Report
9	June 11	(Poland) Polish Grand Prix	Szczecin	(Netherlands) Gérard Rond	(Japan) Akira Watanabe	(Japan) Akira Watanabe	Report
10	July 27	United States Grand Prix	Lexington	(United States) Broc Glover	(United States) Broc Glover	(United States) Broc Glover	Report
11	August 13	(Spain) Spanish Grand Prix	Montgai	(Japan) Akira Watanabe	(Japan) Akira Watanabe	(Japan) Akira Watanabe	Report
12	August 27	(Czech Republic) Czechoslovak Grand Prix	Stříbro	(Netherlands) Gérard Rond	(Belgium) Gaston Rahier	(Belgium) Gaston Rahier	Report

== Final standings ==
Points are awarded based on the results of each individual heat race. The top 10 classified finishers in each heat race score points according to the following scale;

Position	1st	2nd	3rd	4th	5th	6th	7th	8th	9th	10th
Points	15	12	10	8	6	5	4	3	2	1

=== 500cc ===
(Results in italics indicate overall winner)

Pos	Rider	Machine	CH (Switzerland)		AUT (Austria)		FRA (France)		DEN (Denmark)		FIN (Finland)		SWE (Sweden)		USA (United States)		ITA (Italy)		UK (United Kingdom)		BEL (Belgium)		LUX (Luxembourg)		NED (Netherlands)		Points
1	(Finland) Heikki Mikkola	Yamaha	1	1	3	6	2	1	1	1	1	1		1	3	1	3	1	1	3	1	1	2	1	3	3	299
2	(United States) Brad Lackey	Honda	5	3	1	2	1	2	2	3	2	2		2		2	1	4	2	1	2	2					214
3	(Belgium) Roger De Coster	Suzuki	2	4		1		4	3	4	5		2	3	2		2	3		6	10		1	3	5	2	172
4	(West Germany) Herbert Schmitz	Maico			2	3	4	8	6		7	9	1		1	3	8	2	3	7	7	3					127
5	(Netherlands) Gerrit Wolsink	Suzuki	9	2	8	7	6		4	2				4	7		7		4	4			3	5	1	1	124
6	(Belgium) André Malherbe	KTM	7	5	6	5	3	6	5	5	3	4				4	4		6		5	9	7	4	9		109
7	(United Kingdom) Graham Noyce	Honda	6			4	8		9		4	3		5					5	2			4	2	2		92
8	(Belgium) Jaak van Velthoven	KTM	3	6	5		10	7	7	6	6		5		8					5		4		6	6	6	78
9	(France) Jean-Jacques Bruno	KTM			4			5			10	7	6				10				4		6	8			41
10	(Belgium) Yvan van den Broeck	Maico									8	8	3				9		7			7	5		7	7	40
11	(Belgium) André Vromans	Suzuki	4	7	9	9	7			7		5						6	10					9			38
12	(Sweden) Håkan Andersson	Husqvarna	8	9			5	3	8									5		9			8			10	36
13	(Sweden) Bengt Åberg	Yamaha					9	9				6	4								3	5					33
14	(West Germany) Fritz Köbele	KTM				10		10	10	8	9		8						9	8			10	7			21
15	(United States) Mike Bell	Yamaha													4	5											14
15	(Netherlands) Frans Sigmans	Maico																							4	5	14
15	(West Germany) Adolf Weil	Maico											7	8			5	10									14
18	(Denmark) Frank Svendsen	Husqvarna		8						10			9	7													10
19	(Netherlands) Peter Herlings	Husqvarna		10																		6			8		9
19	(Sweden) Arne Lindfors	Husqvarna			10									6									9	10			9
21	(Netherlands) Mat Ghielen	Maico																								4	8
21	(United States) Rick Burgett	Yamaha													5	9											8
23	(United Kingdom) Jonathan Wright	CCM	10		7	8																					8
24	(United States) Danny LaPorte	Suzuki													6												5
24	(United States) Terry Clark	Maico														6											5
24	(Italy) Afro Rustignoli	Maico															6										5
24	(Sweden) Lars Axelsson	Husqvarna																			6						5
28	(United States) Rex Staten	Yamaha														7											4
28	(Italy) Franco Perfini	Montesa																7									4
28	(United States) Gary Semics	Can-Am													10	8											4
28	(Republic of Ireland) Robert Wilkinson	Maico																	8	10							4
28	(Sweden) Torbjörn Winzell	Maico												10							8						4
28	(Sweden) Åke Jonsson	Kramer-Rotax										10	10	9													4
34	(Italy) Italo Forni	Montesa																8									3
34	(Belgium) Raymond Heeren	Maico																				8					3
34	(Netherlands) Ad Verstegen	Yamaha																								8	3
34	(United States) Tommy Croft	Honda													9	10											3
34	(Belgium) François Wellens	Maico																			9	10					3
39	(Denmark) Søren Mortensen	Kramer-Rotax								9																	2
39	(Italy) Franco Picco	Villa																9									2
39	(Netherlands) Johan Scheele	Maico																								9	2
42	(Netherlands) Toon Karsmakers	Husqvarna																							10		1

=== 250cc ===
(Results in italics indicate overall winner)

Pos	Rider	Machine	ESP (Spain)		ITA (Italy)		CZE (Czech Republic)		YUG (Socialist Federal Republic of Yugoslavia)		AUT (Austria)		GER (West Germany)		UK (United Kingdom)		FRA (France)		USA (United States)		SWE (Sweden)		FIN (Finland)		USR (Soviet Union)		Points
1	(Soviet Union) Gennady Moiseyev	KTM		4	10	1	4	2	3	1	2	5			1	1	3	4		5	1			3	1	9	183
2	(Sweden) Torleif Hansen	Kawasaki	3				1	3	1	2			2	2						4		6	1	2	2	1	153
3	(West Germany) Hans Maisch	Maico		3	1							1	1	3	6	4	6	2	3	7	3	4	3		3	6	152
4	(Soviet Union) Vladimir Kavinov	KTM	5		8	6	3	1		6		7		9	4	5	1	1	9		9	1	6	1	5	2	151
5	(United Kingdom) Neil Hudson	Maico	4				7	4	6	5	9	3	3	5	3	3	2	5	7	10	4	2	5		9		130
6	(Belgium) Harry Everts	Bultaco	1	8		3	2		2	3	5		8	1	2	2							4		4		126
7	(Sweden) Håkan Carlqvist	Husqvarna		1		10	8			8		9	5	8	5			6		8	2	5	2	4	8		88
8	(Japan) Torao Suzuki	Montesa		2		9			5		4		6	4		6	5	7			5					10	63
9	(Czech Republic) Jaroslav Falta	ČZ		9		4			7	4	1	2		6					8		7						61
10	(Belgium) Jean-Claude Laquaye	Bultaco	10		3			6	8		10		7		7	8	8	8					10	6			43
11	(Belgium) Raymond Boven	Montesa	2		4		6	5	9	9	7			10			10					10					42
12	(West Germany) Fritz Schneider	KTM	7		2	2					3																38
13	(United States) Chuck Sun	Husqvarna																	6		6	3		8	7	4	35
14	(Soviet Union) Valéry Korneev	KTM			9								9		8		7	3		6				9	6		33
15	(Belgium) Jean-Paul Mingels	Montesa	6	7		7	10		4				4		9												32
16	(France) Daniel Péan	Maico						7	10				10			7	4				8	8	9				26
16	(West Germany) Rolf Dieffenbach	Kawasaki		5			9					4											7			5	26
18	(United States) Jimmy Ellis	Honda																	1	3							25
19	(United States) Marty Tripes	Honda																	2	2							24
19	(Finland) Erkki Sundström	Husqvarna						9								10		10					8	5	10	3	24
21	(United States) Bob Hannah	Yamaha																	5	1							21
21	(West Germany) Willy Bauer	Sachs			5		5					6		7													21
21	(United Kingdom) Rob Hooper	Maico		6				8		7						9		9						10		7	21
24	(France) Patrick Boniface	KTM	8		7					10	8																11
25	(United States) Kent Howerton	Husqvarna																	4								8
26	(Spain) Fernando Muñoz	Montesa				5																					6
26	(Netherlands) Kees van der Ven	Maico									6	10															6
26	(Finland) Matti Tarkkonenn	Honda																				9		7			6
29	(Belgium) Guy Huynen	Sachs			6																						5
29	(Norway) Jan Kristoffersen	Yamaha																			10	7					5
29	(Denmark) Arne Lodal	Husqvarna										8					9										5
32	(Italy) Dario Nani	Gilera				8																					3
32	(Czech Republic) Zdeněk Velký	ČZ																								8	3
34	(Spain) Alberto Ribo	Montesa	9																								2
34	(United States) John Savitski	Yamaha																		9							2
36	(Spain) Antonio Elias	Bultaco		10																							1
36	(Czech Republic) Jaroslav Vojtech	ČZ						10																			1
36	(Sweden) Magnus Nyberg	KTM													10												1
36	(United States) Tony DiStefano	Suzuki																	10								1

=== 125cc ===
(Results in italics indicate overall winner)

Pos	Rider	Machine	AUT (Austria)		ITA (Italy)		BEL (Belgium)		NED (Netherlands)		FRA (France)		YUG (Socialist Federal Republic of Yugoslavia)		GER (West Germany)		CH (Switzerland)		POL (Poland)		USA (United States)		ESP (Spain)		CZE (Czech Republic)		Points
1	(Japan) Akira Watanabe	Suzuki	3	3	3	1	3	3	2	2	2	2	2	1	2	1	1	3	3	1			1	1	3	3	267
2	(Belgium) Gaston Rahier	Suzuki	1	1	1	2	2	2	3		1	1	4	3	1	2		2	2	2	6		3	6	2	1	249
3	(Netherlands) Gérard Rond	Yamaha	2	2	2		1	1	1	1		3	1	2			2	1	1	5	2	4	2	2	1	4	248
4	(Austria) Siegfried Lerner	KTM	5	5	6	6	7			7	3	4	6	5	3		5	9	9		10	5				7	90
5	(Finland) Matti Autio	Suzuki					5	4	5					6		7	4	8	5	3			7	3	4	8	81
6	(Italy) Ivan Alborghetti	Aprilia	8	10	4	7					5	5		7		4	3	4		7		10	5		7	6	78
7	(Finland) Göte Liljegren	KTM			7	8	6	6		3			8	8	4	5			8				4	4	5	5	78
8	(Belgium) André Massant	Honda	6	9		5	4	5	4			9	5		8	3			7	6			6	7	9		76
9	(Czech Republic) Jiří Churavý	ČZ	4	6								8	3	4	5		10	10		4			8		6	2	70
10	(Italy) Corrado Maddii	Beta	7	7	5	4					4	6	10		10	6	7	5	10								53
11	(Soviet Union) Yuri Khudiakov	ČZ		4						4				10	7		8		4				10	5		9	41
12	(Italy) Michele Rinaldi	TGM		8	8	3					8		9			9	6			8							31
13	(United States) Broc Glover	Yamaha																			1	1					30
14	(United Kingdom) Roger Harvey	Suzuki	9								10				9	8		7	6	9							19
15	(Finland) Pauli Piippola	Husqvarna									6	7			6	10	9										17
16	(United States) Marty Moates	Suzuki																			7	3					14
16	(Netherlands) Peter Groeneveld	Suzuki					9		7	5										10						10	14
18	(United States) Gaylon Mosier	Kawasaki																				2					12
18	(Belgium) Robert Greisch	Yamaha	10			9			8	10													9	8			12
20	(United States) Warren Reid	Honda																			3						10
21	(Netherlands) Henk Van Mierlo	Kawasaki						7		6																	9
21	(Czech Republic) Miroslav Jirka	ČZ									7							6									9
21	(United States) Steve Wise	Honda																			4						9
24	(United States) Mark Gregson	Suzuki																			5	9					8
24	(Soviet Union) Anatoly Ovchinikov	ČZ							9				7	9													8
26	(United States) Mike Guerra	Suzuki																			8	7					7
27	(Netherlands) Dinand Ziljlstra	Kawasaki							6																		5
27	(United Kingdom) Geoff Mayes	Kawasaki					8				9																5
27	(United States) Dan Turner	Yamaha																				6					5
30	(Belgium) Marc Velkeneers	Yamaha					10	8																			4
30	(Belgium) François Minne	Aprilia			10	10		9																			4
32	(Belgium) Michel Leclerq	KTM								8																	3
32	(United States) Ron Turner	Yamaha																				8					3
32	(Czech Republic) Miroslav Novacek	ČZ																							8		3
35	(West Germany) Emil Schwarz	Suzuki			9																						2
35	(Soviet Union) Victor Popenko	ČZ								9																	2
35	(United States) David Taylor	Suzuki																			9						2
35	(West Germany) Bernd Betzelbacher	Maico																						9			2
39	(Denmark) Ole Svendson	KTM						10																			1
39	(Sweden) Jonny Bjurström	Suzuki							10																		1
39	(France) Michel Fischer	Portal										10															1
39	(France) Alain Fura	Yamaha																						10			1
39	(Czech Republic) Antonin Gorus	ČZ																							10		1
