= 1975 FIM Motocross World Championship =

Motocross championship season

- Organizer: FIM
- Duration: 6 April/31 August
- Number of races: 36
- Number of manufacturers: 20

Champions
- 500cc: (Belgium) Roger De Coster
- 250cc: (Belgium) Harry Everts
- 125cc: (Belgium) Gaston Rahier

FIM Motocross World Championship
- ← 1974 1976 →

The 1975 FIM Motocross World Championship was the 19th F.I.M. Motocross Racing World Championship season.

== Summary ==
In a rematch of the previous season, Suzuki's Roger De Coster and Husqvarna's Heikki Mikkola were once again the two top competitors in the chase for the 500cc motocross world championship. De Coster claimed 12 moto victories to reclaim the title and win his fourth world championship. Mikkola came in second place with 5 moto victories while De Coster's Suzuki teammate, Gerrit Wolsink finished the season in third place. Honda scored its first-ever overall victory in a motocross world championship Grand Prix when Pierre Karsmakers won the 500cc Canadian Grand Prix. Brad Lackey's victory in the second heat race of the 500cc Luxembourg Grand Prix marks the first 500cc race win for an American competitor.

Harry Everts won the 250cc title for his first world championship. His victory also marked the only motocross world championship for the Austrian Puch factory. Puch fielded a motorcycle which featured an innovative twin carburetor system. Gaston Rahier dominated the inaugural 125cc world championship, winning 7 out of the first 8 Grands Prix for the Suzuki factory racing team. Akira Watanabe became the first Japanese rider to win an overall victory in an FIM Motocross Grand Prix race when he won the 125cc Spanish Grand Prix on August 17. In the wake of the 1973 oil crisis which severely impacted all forms of motorsports, Yamaha made the decision to withdraw their racing team after the 1975 season.

== Grands Prix ==
=== 500cc ===
Round	Date	Grand Prix	Location	Race 1 Winner	Race 2 Winner	Overall Winner	Report
1	April 13	(Switzerland) Swiss Grand Prix	Payerne	(Belgium) Roger De Coster	(Finland) Heikki Mikkola	(Belgium) Roger De Coster	Report
2	May 11	(Italy) Italian Grand Prix	Casale Monferrato	(Sweden) Christer Hammargren	(Finland) Heikki Mikkola	(Finland) Heikki Mikkola	Report
3	May 25	(Finland) Finnish Grand Prix	Ruskeasanta	(Belgium) Roger De Coster	(Belgium) Roger De Coster	(Belgium) Roger De Coster	Report
4	June 8	(Soviet Union) Russian Grand Prix	Chișinău	(Sweden) Åke Jonsson	(Belgium) Roger De Coster	(Belgium) Roger De Coster	Report
5	June 15	(France) French Grand Prix	Lavaur	(Belgium) Roger De Coster	(Belgium) Roger De Coster	(Belgium) Roger De Coster	Report
6	June 22	United States Grand Prix	Carlsbad	(Belgium) Roger De Coster	(Netherlands) Gerrit Wolsink	(Netherlands) Gerrit Wolsink	Report
7	June 29	(Canada) Canadian Grand Prix	Copetown	(Belgium) Roger De Coster	(Netherlands) Gerrit Wolsink	(Netherlands) Pierre Karsmakers	Report
8	July 6	(United Kingdom) British Grand Prix	Hawkstone Park	(Finland) Heikki Mikkola	(Belgium) Roger De Coster	(Netherlands) Gerrit Wolsink	Report
9	July 13	(Germany) West German Grand Prix	Bielstein	(Belgium) Roger De Coster	(Belgium) Roger De Coster	(Belgium) Roger De Coster	Report
10	July 27	(Netherlands) Dutch Grand Prix	Lichtenvoorde	(Netherlands) Gerrit Wolsink	(Finland) Heikki Mikkola	(Netherlands) Gerrit Wolsink	Report
11	August 3	(Belgium) Belgian Grand Prix	Namur	(Finland) Heikki Mikkola	(Sweden) Åke Jonsson	(Belgium) Roger De Coster	Report
12	August 10	Luxembourg Grand Prix	Ettelbruck	(Belgium) Roger De Coster	(United States) Brad Lackey	(Belgium) Roger De Coster	Report

=== 250cc ===
Round	Date	Grand Prix	Location	Race 1 Winner	Race 2 Winner	Overall Winner	Report
1	April 6	(Spain) Spanish Grand Prix	Sabadell	(Sweden) Håkan Andersson	(Germany) Adolf Weil	(Belgium) Harry Everts	Report
2	April 20	(Austria) Austrian Grand Prix	Sittendorf	(Czechoslovakia) Jaroslav Falta	(Czechoslovakia) Jaroslav Falta	(Czechoslovakia) Jaroslav Falta	Report
3	April 27	(Belgium) Belgian Grand Prix	Retinne	(United States) Jim Pomeroy	(Sweden) Håkan Andersson	(United States) Jim Pomeroy	Report
4	May 3	(Czechoslovakia) Czechoslovak Grand Prix	Holice	(Czechoslovakia) Zdeněk Velký	(Czechoslovakia) Jaroslav Falta	(Germany) Willy Bauer	Report
5	May 11	(Poland) Polish Grand Prix	Szczecin	(Belgium) Harry Everts	(Belgium) Harry Everts	(Belgium) Harry Everts	Report
6	June 8	(Socialist Federal Republic of Yugoslavia) Yugoslavian Grand Prix	Tržič	(Czechoslovakia) Zdeněk Velký	(Belgium) Harry Everts	(Soviet Union) Evgueni Rybaltchenko	Report
7	June 15	(Germany) West German Grand Prix	Beuren	(Sweden) Torleif Hansen	(Czechoslovakia) Zdeněk Velký	(Czechoslovakia) Zdeněk Velký	Report
8	June 22	(United Kingdom) British Grand Prix	Portsmouth-Charlton	(Belgium) Harry Everts	(Sweden) Håkan Andersson	(Belgium) Harry Everts	Report
9	July 6	(France) French Grand Prix	Thomer-la-Sôgne	(West Germany) Adolf Weil	(Czechoslovakia) Zdeněk Velký	(Czechoslovakia) Zdeněk Velký	Report
10	August 10	(Sweden) Swedish Grand Prix	Barkarby	(West Germany) Hans Maisch	(Soviet Union) Evgueni Rybaltchenko	(Soviet Union) Evgueni Rybaltchenko	Report
11	August 17	(Finland) Finnish Grand Prix	Hyvinkää	(Sweden) Håkan Andersson	(Soviet Union) Gennady Moiseyev	(Belgium) Harry Everts	Report
12	August 31	(Switzerland) Swiss Grand Prix	Wohlen	(Sweden) Torleif Hansen	(Belgium) Harry Everts	(Sweden) Håkan Andersson	Report

=== 125cc ===
Round	Date	Grand Prix	Location	Race 1 Winner	Race 2 Winner	Overall Winner	Report
1	April 27	(France) French Grand Prix	Cognac	(Belgium) Gaston Rahier	(Belgium) Gilbert De Roover	(Belgium) Gaston Rahier	Report
2	May 4	(United Kingdom) British Grand Prix	Tenby	(Belgium) Gaston Rahier	(Belgium) Gaston Rahier	(Belgium) Gaston Rahier	Report
3	May 11	(Socialist Federal Republic of Yugoslavia) Yugoslavian Grand Prix	Orehova vas	(Belgium) Gaston Rahier	(Belgium) Gaston Rahier	(Belgium) Gaston Rahier	Report
4	May 25	(Sweden) Swedish Grand Prix	Upplands Väsby	(Belgium) Gaston Rahier	(Belgium) Gaston Rahier	(Belgium) Gaston Rahier	Report
5	June 1	(Netherlands) Dutch Grand Prix	Markelo	(Belgium) Gaston Rahier	(Belgium) Gaston Rahier	(Belgium) Gaston Rahier	Report
6	June 8	(Poland) Polish Grand Prix	Olsztyn	(Belgium) Gilbert De Roover	(Belgium) Gilbert De Roover	(Belgium) Gilbert De Roover	Report
7	June 22	(Germany) West German Grand Prix	Schrecksbach	(Belgium) Gaston Rahier	(Belgium) Gaston Rahier	(Belgium) Gaston Rahier	Report
8	June 29	(Czechoslovakia) Czechoslovak Grand Prix	Tábor	(Belgium) Gaston Rahier	(Belgium) Gaston Rahier	(Belgium) Gaston Rahier	Report
9	July 6	United States Grand Prix	Lexington	(United States) Marty Smith	(United States) Marty Smith	(United States) Marty Smith	Report
10	July 13	(Canada) Canadian Grand Prix	Saint-Gabriel-de-Brandon	(Japan) Yoshifumo Sugio	(Belgium) Gilbert De Roover	(Czech Republic) Antonin Baborowsky	Report
11	August 17	(Spain) Spanish Grand Prix	Montgai	(Japan) Akira Watanabe	(Japan) Akira Watanabe	(Japan) Akira Watanabe	Report
12	August 24	(Belgium) Belgian Grand Prix	Orp-Le-Grand	(Belgium) Gaston Rahier	(Czech Republic) Anthonin Baborovsky	(Belgium) Gaston Rahier	Report

== Final standings ==
Points are awarded based on the results of each individual heat race. The top 10 classified finishers in each heat race score points according to the following scale;

Position	1st	2nd	3rd	4th	5th	6th	7th	8th	9th	10th
Points	15	12	10	8	6	5	4	3	2	1

=== 500cc ===
(Results in italics indicate overall winner)

Pos	Rider	Machine	CH (Switzerland)		ITA (Italy)		FIN (Finland)		USSR (Soviet Union)		FRA (France)		USA (United States)		CAN (Canada)		UK (United Kingdom)		GER (West Germany)		NED (Netherlands)		BEL (Belgium)		LUX (Luxembourg)		Points
1	(Belgium) Roger De Coster	Suzuki	2	1			1	1	2	1	1	1	1	9	1			1	1	1		3	2	2	1	2	192
2	(Finland) Heikki Mikkola	Husqvarna	1	2	3	1	2	2	3	3	2	2	8	4	3		1			3		1	1	7			165
3	(Netherlands) Gerrit Wolsink	Suzuki	3	3	2	5				4	5	4	3	1	4	1	2	2	3		1	2		5	5		149
4	(Sweden) Åke Jonsson	Yamaha	6	6	5	2	3	3	1	2							6	3	4	5	7	4		1	3	3	132
5	(Belgium) Jaak van Velthoven	Yamaha		10	4	3	5	4		6	4	3					3		5				3	3	2		104
6	(United States) Brad Lackey	Husqvarna	5	4			4	6	4	7	7	5	2		5		9		7		5			4		1	96
7	(Sweden) Bengt Åberg	Bultaco	4								3	7	6			6		7	2		3		5		4		72
8	(West Germany) Herbert Schmitz	Maico						8			6	6						5		2	6	6	4	6	6	8	62
9	(Sweden) Arne Kring	Husqvarna	7	5			7	5		8							4	6		7	4						48
10	(Netherlands) Pierre Karsmakers	Honda											10	2	2	2		4									45
11	(Sweden) Christer Hammargren	Kawasaki		8	1	4	8								8		5				8						17
12	(Netherlands) Frans Sigmans	Maico	8	7			6	7													2	5			8		37
13	(United States) Tony DiStefano	Suzuki												3	6	3											25
14	(Italy) Alberto Agiolini	Maico																	9	4		8				4	21
15	(Belgium) Jean-Claude LaQuaye	Bultaco	9					10			9						7			6						5	20
15	(Italy) Paolo Piron	ČZ			6	6					8									9				10		7	20
17	(Soviet Union) Anatoly Botchkov	ČZ	10				9	9	6												10	10	7			10	17
18	(Soviet Union) Vladimir Khudiakov	ČZ				7			9	9	10						10			8					9		6
19	(United States) Steve Stackable	Maico												8	7	5											13
20	(Belgium) Jean-Paul Mingels	Bultaco			7							8										9		8			12
21	(Austria) Ludwig Reinbolt	Maico																					6			6	10
22	(United States) Rex Staten	ČZ											4	10													9
22	(Soviet Union) Vladimir Kavinov	ČZ							8	5																	9
22	(United States) Jimmy Weinert	Yamaha											7	6													9
22	(Denmark) Arne Lodal	Bultaco										10					8	8					9				9
26	(United States) Mike Hartwig	Yamaha														4											8
26	(United States) Kent Howerton	Husqvarna											9	5													8
28	(Sweden) Arne Lindfors	Husqvarna																		10		7				9	7
29	(Czech Republic) Miroslav Novacek	ČZ							5																		6
29	(United States) Gaylon Mosier	Maico											5														6
29	(United States) Mike Runyard	Can-Am													9	7											6
32	(Switzerland) Fritz Graf	Yamaha																	6								3
32	(Finland) Göte Lijegren	Husqvarna			8													9									3
32	(Belgium) André Massant	Yamaha		9			10					9															3
35	(Soviet Union) Jaroslav Zelenka	ČZ							7																		4
35	(United States) Billy Grossi	Suzuki												7													4
35	(United Kingdom) Vic Eastwood	CCM																							7		4
35	(Belgium) Raymond Heeren	Maico																	8						10		4
39	(France) Daniel Terroitin	Maico																					8				3
39	(Japan) Masura Ikeda	Suzuki														8											3
41	(Belgium) Willy Van Loon	Yamaha																			9						2
41	(West Germany) Rolf Dieffenbach	Maico																						9			2
41	(Sweden) Jan Eric Sallqvist	Kawasaki														9											2
41	(United Kingdom) Rob Hooper	Husqvarna																	10				10				2
45	(Soviet Union) Sergey Opatovitch	ČZ							10																		1
45	(Czech Republic) Jiří Ondryas	ČZ								10																	1
45	(United Kingdom) Stuart Dunn	ČZ																10									1
45	(United States) Buck Murphy	Can-Am													10												1
45	(United States) Mark Blackwell	Husqvarna														10											1

=== 250cc ===
(Results in italics indicate overall winner)

Pos	Rider	Machine	ESP (Spain)		AUT (Austria)		BEL (Belgium)		CZE (Czech Republic)		POL (Poland)		YUG (Socialist Federal Republic of Yugoslavia)		GER (West Germany)		UK (United Kingdom)		FRA (France)		SWE (Sweden)		FIN (Finland)		CH (Switzerland)		Points
1	(Belgium) Harry Everts	Puch	2	3	3		5			8	1	1	7	1		2	1	2	7		5	8	2	3		1	159
2	(Sweden) Håkan Andersson	Yamaha	1			9	9	1		9	2	5		6		3	5	1		2		6		1	3	4	134
3	(West Germany) Willy Bauer	Suzuki	3	2	5	2	4	3	4	2		2	3			4		4	9	4	3		4			3	130
4	(West Germany) Adolf Weil	Maico		1	10	8	2	5	5		3		2		6		7		1	3	4	2	5	6	2	6	129
5	(West Germany) Hans Maisch	Maico		5		4		2	6	3		3	4		7		2	3	3	5	1	4					120
6	(Czech Republic) Zdeněk Velký	ČZ		9		7	3		1			7	1		2	1			2	1			7				108
7	(United States) Jim Pomeroy	Bultaco			6	5	1	4		6			6	4	3	10	3	8	6	8		5			5	2	101
8	(Soviet Union) Evgeny Rybaltchenko	KTM	7			10	10	7	8			4	5	2				5	4	6	2	1	6	8	8	5	94
9	(Belgium) Joël Robert	Suzuki	8	7	2	3	6	8	3				10	3	4	7	4		8	7							84
10	(Sweden) Torleif Hansen	Kawasaki		4	7		7								1							3	3		1		58
11	(Czech Republic) Jaroslav Falta	ČZ	5	8	1	1				1																	54
12	(Soviet Union) Gennady Moiseyev	KTM												5	9	5					7	7	1		4		45
13	(Sweden) Uno Palm	Husqvarna		6				6			6	6		9				7			9	10		4		7	41
14	(Czech Republic) Oldrich Hamrsmid	ČZ			4	6	8	10	7	5					5				5								39
15	(Czech Republic) Miroslav Halm	ČZ							2	4											6				7	8	33
16	(Austria) Siegfrid Lerner	KTM	9									10	8	8						9				5			17
16	(Finland) Kalevi Vehkonen	Husqvarna	6	10							10	8	9						10					7			17
18	(France) Daniel Pean	Maico			9			9						7		8				10	8					10	16
19	(Japan) Torao Suzuki	Yamaha																				9		2			14
19	(United Kingdom) Vic Allan	Bultaco	10		8					7	5																14
21	(Belgium) Sylvain Geboers	Husqvarna	4								7			10													13
22	(Finland) Pauli Piipola	Maico															9	6							6		12
23	(Sweden) Håkan Carlqvist	Ossa													8		8						10		9	9	11
24	(Japan) Hideaki Suzuki	Yamaha									4																8
24	(Soviet Union) Anatoly Ovchinnikov	ČZ									8					6											8
26	(New Zealand) Ivan Miller	Bultaco															6										5
27	(Finland) Erkki Sundström	Husqvarna																					8	10			4
27	(Soviet Union) Pavel Rulev	ČZ							9			9															4
29	(Soviet Union) Vladis Grinbergs	ČZ													10									9			3
29	(France) Jean-Claude Nowak	Maico																9			10						3
31	(Denmark) Erling Klinke	Bultaco									9																2
31	(West Germany) Herbert Stauch	Maico														9											2
31	(Finland) Lars Ohberg	Husqvarna																					9				2
31	(Czech Republic) Frantisek Jirka	ČZ							10	10																	2
35	(United Kingdom) Malcolm Davis	Bultaco															10										1
35	(Belgium) Claude Jobé	Ossa																							10		1
35	(United Kingdom) Stuart Nunn	ČZ																10									1

=== 125cc ===
(Results in italics indicate overall winner)

Pos	Rider	Machine	FRA (France)		UK (United Kingdom)		YUG (Socialist Federal Republic of Yugoslavia)		SWE (Sweden)		NED (Netherlands)		POL (Poland)		GER (West Germany)		CZE (Czech Republic)		USA (United States)		CAN (Canada)		ESP (Spain)		BEL (Belgium)		Points
1	(Belgium) Gaston Rahier	Suzuki	1	3	1	1	1	1	1	1	1	1	2	2	1	1	1	1			3	3	2	2	1	2	195
2	(Belgium) Gilbert De Roover	Zündapp / ČZ	3	1	3	4	2	2			2		1	1	2	2	2	2	2	4	4	1			2	3	168
3	(Czech Republic) Anthonin Baborovsky	ČZ		4	5	3	3	4		4	3	3	3	3	5	5	3				2	2		3		1	135
4	(Japan) Akira Watanabe	Suzuki	4	2	10	5	5	3	3	2	5			4	3	3	4		4		5	4	1	1	4	5	134
5	(Czech Republic) Jiří Churavý	ČZ	6		9		6	5		3			4	6	4	4	6	3	9	5			3	4	3		99
6	(Belgium) Ivan Van Den Broek	Yamaha				9		6	4	5	6	4	6	5	6	6	5	4					4		5	6	80
7	(Belgium) André Malherbe	Zündapp	2		2	2	4		2																6	4	69
8	(Japan) Yoshifumo Sugio	Yamaha																	3	2	1	5					43
9	(Italy) Gualtiere Brissoni	SWM		5	8	10	8	7						7	7	7	7	5							9		41
10	(Netherlands) Gérard Rond	Yamaha									4	2				8								6		8	31
11	(United States) Marty Smith	Honda																	1	1							30
12	(Italy) Dario Nani	Ancilotti				8					7	10	5		8			8					6			9	27
13	(Finland) Matti Autio	Suzuki							6	8		6				9							8	8			21
14	(United States) Jimmy Ellis	Can-Am																	5	3							16
15	(United Kingdom) Terry Dyer	Husqvarna				6	7		9	7																	15
16	(Belgium) François Minne	Yamaha	9														8	6						7			14
17	(United Kingdom) Graham Noyce	Husqvarna	5		7										9		10										13
18	(United Kingdom) Roger Harvey	Husqvarna			4	7																					12
18	(Italy) Tomaso Lolli	Simonini																					5	5			12
20	(Finland) Lars Karlsson	Husqvarna							5	6																	11
21	(United States) Dan Turner	Honda																	6	6							10
21	(Canada) Larry Mackenzie	Yamaha																			6	6					10
21	(United Kingdom) Chris Clark	Husqvarna							8			8											7				10
24	(Spain) Ignacio Bulto	Bultaco	7	6																							9
24	(Czech Republic) Jaroslav Janis	ČZ		7				10									9	9									9
26	(Belgium) Daniel Beaumont	Yamaha		9	6																				10		8
26	(United States) Tim Hart	Yamaha																	7	7							8
26	(Belgium) Marcel Wiertz	Bultaco																							7	7	8
26	(Sweden) Torbjorn Winzell	Husqvarna											10					7			8						8
30	(Netherlands) Johnny Vink	Kawasaki									8	7															7
31	(Netherlands) Marcel Deibergen	Fantic										5															6
31	(Italy) Gian Carlo Curradi	Ancillotti	10	10					7																		6
31	(West Germany) Harald Strößenreuther	Maico											7	9													6
31	(United States) Jeff Wecker	Kawasaki																			9	7					6
31	(Soviet Union) Yuri Khudiakov	ČZ											8	8													6
31	(United States) Tommy Croft	Honda																	8	8							6
37	(Netherlands) Gert Demoed	Yamaha					9	8																			5
38	(Finland) Heikki Ylomen	Yamaha																			7						4
38	(Spain) Jorge Capapey	Bultaco																					9	9			4
40	(Finland) Timo Remes	Yamaha	8																								3
40	(France) Jean-Paul Hypolite	Kawasaki		8																							3
40	(Canada) Ronnie Mathews	Can-Am																				8					3
40	(West Germany) Edi Hau	Zündapp																							8		3
40	(Finland) Osme Perala	Yamaha											9	10													3
45	(Austria) Michael Weiss	Can-Am						9																			2
45	(Sweden) Stellan Andersson	Honda								9																	2
45	(Netherlands) Wim Van Den Brink	Monark									9																2
45	(Netherlands) Jaak Verwaayen	Kawasaki										9															2
45	(Sweden) Nills Arne Nilsson	Husqvarna																		9							2
45	(West Germany) Emil Schwarz	Husqvarna													10	10											2
45	(United States) Mickey Boone	Honda																	10	10							2
45	(Canada) Henning Hansen	Husqvarna																				9					2
53	(Soviet Union) Yuri Semko	ČZ					10																				1
53	(France) Jean-Claude Bontemps	Husqvarna							10																		1
53	(Sweden) Steffan Eneqvist	Yamaha								10																	1
53	(Netherlands) Heenk Poorte	Montesa									10																1
53	(Austria) Gerhard Huber	Can-Am																10									1
53	(Canada) Jay Kimber	Kawasaki																			10						1
53	(Canada) Bob Eccles	Kawasaki																				10					1
53	(Denmark) John Andersen	Husqvarna																					10				1
53	(Italy) Curradi Foschini	Yamaha																						10			1
53	(Belgium) Dieudonne Stouvenakers	Yamaha																								10	1
