= 1976 FIM Motocross World Championship =

Motocross championship season

- Organizer: FIM
- Duration: 4 April/22 August
- Number of races: 36
- Number of manufacturers: 20

Champions
- 500cc: (Belgium) Roger De Coster
- 250cc: (Finland) Heikki Mikkola
- 125cc: (Belgium) Gaston Rahier

FIM Motocross World Championship
- ← 1975 1977 →

The 1976 FIM Motocross World Championship was the 20th F.I.M. Motocross Racing World Championship season.

== Summary ==
With no team orders between them, Suzuki teammates Roger De Coster and Gerrit Wolsink engaged in a season-long points battle for the 500cc World Championship that wasn't decided until the final race of the season in Luxembourg. Wolsink had the best season of his career by finishing on the podium in seven of the twelve Grand Prix races including four Grand Prix victories however, it wasn't enough to top De Coster's six Grand Prix victories as the Belgian rider claimed the fifth and final World Championship of his career.

Husqvarna's Heikki Mikkola returned to the 250cc class and won a tight points battle to finish the season one point ahead of KTM's Gennady Moiseyev. Gaston Rahier once again dominated the 125cc class to win his second consecutive world championship for Suzuki. Yamaha's team was disbanded with Jaak van Velthoven joining the KTM team and Åke Jonsson returning to his former Maico team while, 250cc rider Håkan Andersson moved to the Montesa factory racing team. Six-time 250cc World Champion Joël Robert competes in the final world championship race of his career at the 1976 250cc British Grand Prix.

== Grands Prix ==
=== 500cc ===
Round	Date	Grand Prix	Location	Race 1 Winner	Race 2 Winner	Overall Winner	Report
1	April 4	(Switzerland) Swiss Grand Prix	Payerne	(Netherlands) Gerrit Wolsink	(Netherlands) Gerrit Wolsink	(Netherlands) Gerrit Wolsink	Report
2	April 11	(France) French Grand Prix	Pernes-les-Fontaines	(Germany) Adolf Weil	(Belgium) Roger De Coster	(Germany) Adolf Weil	Report
3	May 2	(Italy) Italian Grand Prix	Fermo	(Belgium) Roger De Coster	(Netherlands) Pierre Karsmakers	(Belgium) Roger De Coster	Report
4	May 9	(Austria) Austrian Grand Prix	Sittendorf	(Germany) Adolf Weil	(Belgium) Roger De Coster	(Belgium) Roger De Coster	Report
5	May 16	(Sweden) Swedish Grand Prix	Västerås	(Belgium) Roger De Coster	(Belgium) Roger De Coster	(Belgium) Roger De Coster	Report
6	May 23	(Finland) Finnish Grand Prix	Ruskeasanta	(United States) Brad Lackey	(Belgium) Roger De Coster	(Netherlands) Gerrit Wolsink	Report
7	June 13	(Germany) West German Grand Prix	Beuren	(Belgium) Roger De Coster	(Belgium) Roger De Coster	(Belgium) Roger De Coster	Report
8	June 20	United States Grand Prix	Carlsbad	(Netherlands) Gerrit Wolsink	(Netherlands) Gerrit Wolsink	(Netherlands) Gerrit Wolsink	Report
9	June 27	(Canada) Canadian Grand Prix	Mosport	(Netherlands) Gerrit Wolsink	(Netherlands) Gerrit Wolsink	(Netherlands) Gerrit Wolsink	Report
10	July 4	(United Kingdom) British Grand Prix	Dodington Park	(United Kingdom) Graham Noyce	(Germany) Adolf Weil	(Belgium) Roger De Coster	Report
11	August 1	(Belgium) Belgian Grand Prix	Namur	(Belgium) Roger De Coster	(Netherlands) Gerrit Wolsink	(Belgium) Roger De Coster	Report
12	August 8	Luxembourg Grand Prix	Ettelbruck	(Belgium) Jaak van Velthoven	(Belgium) Jaak van Velthoven	(Belgium) Jaak van Velthoven	Report

=== 250cc ===
Round	Date	Grand Prix	Location	Race 1 Winner	Race 2 Winner	Overall Winner	Report
1	April 4	(Spain) Spanish Grand Prix	Sabadell	(Finland) Heikki Mikkola	(Finland) Heikki Mikkola	(Finland) Heikki Mikkola	Report
2	April 25	(Belgium) Belgian Grand Prix	Betekom	(Czechoslovakia) Jaroslav Falta	(Finland) Heikki Mikkola	(Finland) Heikki Mikkola	Report
3	May 2	(Czechoslovakia) Czechoslovak Grand Prix	Holice	(Soviet Union) Vladimir Kavinov	(Czechoslovakia) Jaroslav Falta	(Sweden) Torleif Hansen	Report
4	May 9	(Poland) Polish Grand Prix	Szczecin	(United States) Jim Pomeroy	(Finland) Heikki Mikkola	(Sweden) Torleif Hansen	Report
5	May 16	(Soviet Union) Russian Grand Prix	Lviv	(Soviet Union) Gennady Moiseyev	(Finland) Heikki Mikkola	(Soviet Union) Anatoly Ovchinikov	Report
6	May 23	(Socialist Federal Republic of Yugoslavia) Yugoslav Grand Prix	Orehova vas	(Soviet Union) Gennady Moiseyev	(Finland) Heikki Mikkola	(Finland) Heikki Mikkola	Report
7	May 30	(Italy) Italian Grand Prix	La Vecchia	(United States) Jim Pomeroy	(Soviet Union) Gennady Moiseyev	(Soviet Union) Gennady Moiseyev	Report
8	June 13	(France) French Grand Prix	La Coudraie - Niort	No race	No race	Riders boycotted due to excessive dust	Report
9	June 20	(United Kingdom) British Grand Prix	Newbury	(Soviet Union) Gennady Moiseyev	(Soviet Union) Gennady Moiseyev	(Soviet Union) Gennady Moiseyev	Report
10	June 27	(Germany) West German Grand Prix	Gaildorf	(Soviet Union) Vladimir Kavinov	(Soviet Union) Vladimir Kavinov	(Soviet Union) Vladimir Kavinov	Report
11	August 8	(Netherlands) Dutch Grand Prix	Lichtenvoorde	(Finland) Heikki Mikkola	(Soviet Union) Gennady Moiseyev	(Belgium) Harry Everts	Report
12	August 15	(Sweden) Swedish Grand Prix	Ulricehamn	(Soviet Union) Gennady Moiseyev	(Soviet Union) Gennady Moiseyev	(Soviet Union) Gennady Moiseyev	Report

=== 125cc ===
Round	Date	Grand Prix	Location	Race 1 Winner	Race 2 Winner	Overall Winner	Report
1	April 4	(Austria) Austrian Grand Prix	Launsdorf	(Czech Republic) Jiří Churavý	(Belgium) Gaston Rahier	(Belgium) Gaston Rahier	Report
2	April 11	(Italy) Italian Grand Prix	Livorno	(Belgium) Gaston Rahier	(United States) Marty Smith	(Belgium) Gaston Rahier	Report
3	May 2	(United Kingdom) British Grand Prix	Hawkstone Park	(Belgium) Gaston Rahier	(Belgium) Gaston Rahier	(Belgium) Gaston Rahier	Report
4	May 30	(Belgium) Belgian Grand Prix	Hoeselt	(Belgium) Gaston Rahier	(Belgium) Gaston Rahier	(Belgium) Gaston Rahier	Report
5	June 7	(Denmark) Danish Grand Prix	Nissebjerget	(Belgium) Gaston Rahier	(United States) Marty Smith	(United States) Marty Smith	Report
6	June 13	(Finland) Finnish Grand Prix	Hämeenlinna	(Belgium) Gaston Rahier	(Belgium) Gaston Rahier	(Belgium) Gaston Rahier	Report
7	June 20	(Czechoslovakia) Czechoslovak Grand Prix	Stříbro	(Czech Republic) Jiří Churavý	(Czech Republic) Jiří Churavý	(Czech Republic) Jiří Churavý	Report
8	June 27	(France) French Grand Prix	Cassel	(Belgium) Gaston Rahier	(Czech Republic) Zdeněk Velký	(Czech Republic) Zdeněk Velký	Report
9	July 11	United States Grand Prix	Lexington	(United States) Marty Smith	(United States) Marty Smith	(United States) Marty Smith	Report
10	August 8	(Germany) West German Grand Prix	Laubus-Eschbach	(Belgium) Gaston Rahier	(Belgium) Gaston Rahier	(Belgium) Gaston Rahier	Report
11	August 15	(Spain) Spanish Grand Prix	Montgai	(Belgium) Gaston Rahier	(Belgium) Gaston Rahier	(Belgium) Gaston Rahier	Report
12	August 22	(Switzerland) Swiss Grand Prix	Schupfart	(Czech Republic) Jiří Churavý	(Belgium) Gaston Rahier	(Belgium) Gaston Rahier	Report

== Final standings ==
Points are awarded based on the results of each individual heat race. The top 10 classified finishers in each heat race score points according to the following scale;

Position	1st	2nd	3rd	4th	5th	6th	7th	8th	9th	10th
Points	15	12	10	8	6	5	4	3	2	1

=== 500cc ===
(Results in italics indicate overall winner)

Pos	Rider	Machine	SUI (Switzerland)		FRA (France)		ITA (Italy)		AUT (Austria)		SWE (Sweden)		FIN (Finland)		GER (West Germany)		USA (United States)		CAN (Canada)		GBR (United Kingdom)		BEL (Belgium)		LUX (Luxembourg)		Points
1	(Belgium) Roger De Coster	Suzuki			5	1	1	2	2	1	1	1	7	1	1	1			2		3	2	1	2		4	183
2	(Netherlands) Gerrit Wolsink	Suzuki	1	1	2	4	2			9	5		2	2	2	7	1	1	1	1	2			1	2	2	177
3	(West Germany) Adolf Weil	Maico	6	2	1	2	7	3	1	7	3	2		7		4		6	8			1	2	10	3		141
4	(United Kingdom) Graham Noyce	Maico	7	3			3			2	6		8	3		2	2			3	1						103
5	(United States) Brad Lackey	Husqvarna					4	5					1		4	8	7	3	3	2	6		3	4			99
6	(West Germany) Herbert Schmitz	Puch	4		3		5		7		2	4		6	5	5	5	8			4	6	4		4		96
7	(Belgium) Jaak van Velthoven	KTM				6	10				7				3		6	9	5	4		5	6	3	1	1	92
8	(Sweden) Åke Jonsson	Maico	9	4		3	6	7		6	4	5	6	5		6	10	4	4	6	9	4					87
9	(Netherlands) Pierre Karsmakers	Honda	2		6			1		3		3		9				2	6			10					72
10	(West Germany) Willy Bauer	KTM	5		4		8	4		4		6			6							7	8				50
11	(Sweden) Bengt Åberg	Bultaco	3		10	5	9	8	10		9		4			3										7	47
12	(United Kingdom) Vic Allan	CCM		5	7				3						10		8					3			5	5	46
13	(Sweden) Christer Hammargren	Kawasaki				8			4		8	7		10								9				3	31
13	(Netherlands) Frans Sigmans	Maico	8	6					5				5	4								8					31
15	(Soviet Union) Vladimir Khudiakov	ČZ			9			6	8			8			9						8			8		6	26
16	(United Kingdom) Vic Eastwood	CCM		7									3										5	9			22
17	(Italy) Alberto Angiolini	Maico			8	7		9	6	5																	20
18	(Belgium) Raymond Heeren	Maico																			7		7	6	6	10	19
19	(United States) Steve Stackable	Suzuki															4	10	9	7							15
19	(Denmark) Arne Lodal	Husqvarna	10	9																			9	7	7	9	15
21	(United States) Tony DiStefano	Suzuki																7	7	5							14
22	(Soviet Union) Vladimir Korneev	ČZ											9		8	9									8	8	13
23	(Soviet Union) Anatoly Bochkov	ČZ		8					9	8	10	9	10														12
24	(United States) Gaylon Mosier	Maico															3										10
25	(United States) Tommy Croft	Honda															9	5									8
26	(Belgium) Jean-Claude Laquaye	Bultaco																					10	5			7
27	(United Kingdom) John Banks	CCM																			5						6
28	(West Germany) Fritz Köbele	Maico													7	10											5
28	(Sweden) Arne Lindfors	Husqvarna				9								8													5
30	(Belgium) Gilbert De Roover	Beta		10				10																	9		4
31	(Canada) Nicky Kinishita	Yamaha																		8							3
31	(Canada) Jim Turner	Suzuki																	10	9							3
33	(Belgium) André Massant	Yamaha								10		10															3
34	(France) Patrick Drobecq	Maico				10																					1
34	(United States) Rob Harris	ČZ																		10							1
34	(New Zealand) Ivan Miller	Bultaco																			10						1
34	(Switzerland) Christophe Husser	Yamaha																							10		1

=== 250cc ===
(Results in italics indicate overall winner)

Pos	Rider	Machine	ESP (Spain)		BEL (Belgium)		TCH (Czechoslovakia)		POL (Poland)		USR (Soviet Union)		YUG (Socialist Federal Republic of Yugoslavia)		ITA (Italy)		FRA (France)	GBR (United Kingdom)		GER (West Germany)		NED (Netherlands)		SWE (Sweden)		Points
1	(Finland) Heikki Mikkola	Husqvarna	1	1	2	1		3		1		1	2	1	3	6					2	1		2		163
2	(Soviet Union) Gennady Moiseyev	KTM					4	4	2	7	1		1	3	2	1		1	1				1	1	1	162
3	(Soviet Union) Vladimir Kavinov	KTM	7	6	8	7	1	10	4	4	3	3	5	2	6				3	1	1				4	122
4	(United States) Jim Pomeroy	Bultaco	4	4	7	4	6		1	5				6	1			4			3	3	9			102
5	(Belgium) Harry Everts	Puch	9	5	3	2		7						4				2	2	4	6	4	3	8		96
6	(Sweden) Torleif Hansen	Kawasaki	2	2			3	2	3	2									8			2			2	95
7	(Soviet Union) Anatoly Ovchinnikov	KTM		10			7				2	2	4			2		5		7		5	2	4		85
8	(Czech Republic) Antonin Baborovski	ČZ			6	9	2	6		6		5	7					3	4	2	5					75
9	(West Germany) Hans Maisch	Maico	3		5	3		5			4	4	6		4	3										71
10	(Sweden) Håkan Andersson	Montesa	5		4		8			3	5		3	5	7									10		54
10	(Czech Republic) Jaroslav Falta	ČZ			1	5	5	1				6			8	8		10								54
12	(France) Daniel Péan	Maico	6	7	10	8	10	8	5		6	8			9	4		6			8	7				53
13	(Belgium) Raymond Boven	Montessa		3			9		8				9						7	5		8	4	9	7	44
14	(Belgium) André Malherbe	KTM												7	5	5		9	6	3						33
15	(Sweden) Håkan Carlqvist	Ossa	8						6	9		9		8								6		5	5	32
16	(West Germany) Rolf Dieffenbach	Maico	10			10				10						7		7	9	6	7		10			23
17	(France) Jean-Jacques Bruno	KTM		9																	4		5		6	21
17	(Belgium) Joël Robert	Puch		8	9	6							10	10				8	5							21
17	(United Kingdom) Geoff Mayes	ČZ								8	8										9	9	6	7	9	21
21	(Sweden) Uno Palm	Husqvarna																						3	3	20
21	(Czech Republic) Miroslav Halm	ČZ							9		7	10	8	9												12
22	(United Kingdom) Rob Hooper	Husqvarna									9	7				10				9						9
23	(Finland) Pauli Piipola	Husqvarna													10	9			10	10					8	8
24	(Netherlands) Gérard Rond	Yamaha																						6		5
25	(Belgium) Sylvain Geboers	Maico							7																	4
25	(Sweden) Ove Karlsson	Husqvarna																					7			4
27	(Austria) Siegfrid Lerner	KTM																		8						3
27	(Czech Republic) Oldrich Hamrsmid	ČZ																					8			3
27	(Czech Republic) Frantisek Jirka	ČZ						9	10																	3
30	(Soviet Union) Victor Popenko	ČZ									10															1
30	(Switzerland) Walter Kalberer	Yamaha																			10					1
30	(Netherlands) Fons Nijhof	Suzuki																				10				1
30	(Finland) Erkki Sundstrom	Suzuki																							10	1

=== 125cc ===
(Results in italics indicate overall winner)

Pos	Rider	Machine	AUT (Austria)		ITA (Italy)		UK (United Kingdom)		BEL (Belgium)		DEN (Denmark)		FIN (Finland)		TCH (Czechoslovakia)		FRA (France)		USA (United States)		GER (West Germany)		ESP (Spain)		SUI (Switzerland)		Points
1	(Belgium) Gaston Rahier	Suzuki	2	1	1	2	1	1	1	1	1		1	1	2	2	1		5		1	1	1	1	2	1	195
2	(Czech Republic) Jiří Churavý	ČZ	1	2	5	3	2	2	2		3	2			1	1			8	6		3		3	1		160
3	(Czech Republic) Zdeněk Velký	ČZ	5				4		3	3		3			3		2	1	10	5	3		2	2	4	3	133
4	(United States) Marty Smith	Honda			2	1	3	7			2	1		2					1	1	4	2					130
5	(United Kingdom) Roger Harvey	Husqvarna	3					6	4	4	7	5	10			5	7	3			9	6	6	8	10	4	82
6	(Soviet Union) Yuri Khudiakov	ČZ	8							2	8		4		8	4	3	2			8						62
7	(Soviet Union) Pavel Rulev	ČZ		5	6	4	5	3							6		4				5		10			5	61
8	(Finland) Göte Lijegren	Husqvarna		10					7	8	10	6	2	3								7	4		7	8	55
8	(Italy) Dario Nani	Gilera			3	8		5		5	4	4									6	5			8		55
10	(Italy) Ivano Bessone	Beta		3	4	6	9		6							9							5	7		6	47
11	(United Kingdom) Andy Ainsworth	Suzuki						10	5	7	5	7					5	5						5	5		44
12	(Italy) Ivan Alborghetti	Aprilia																			2	4			3	2	42
13	(Finland) Matti Autio	Suzuki		8									3	5			9					8	8			9	29
14	(Italy) Corrado Maddii	Aspès	9	6	7																7		3	9			27
15	(United States) Bob Hannah	Yamaha																	2	2							24
16	(United States) Billy Grossi	Suzuki																	3	3							20
16	(Sweden) Tommy Olsson	Ancilotti			8		6	4		9													9				20
18	(Belgium) François Minne	Montesa			9										10		10				10	9	7	4			19
19	(Belgium) Dieudonne Stouvenakers	Suzuki	10				8	8		6		8										10					16
20	(Italy) Paolo Piron	Beta	6	4		9																					15
21	(Belgium) Eddy Hau	Zündapp	4	7																							12
21	(Japan) Yoshifumi Sugio	Yamaha																	4	7							12
23	(Finland) Osme Perala	Yamaha						9					6	7													11
23	(Sweden) Par Ake Hansson	Ancilotti											8	4													11
23	(Czech Republic) Jaroslav Janis	ČZ													4	8											11
23	(France) Rudy Potisek	Yamaha															8	4									11
27	(West Germany) Harald Strößenreuther	KTM	7		10	7	10																				10
27	(Czech Republic) Vilem Toman	ČZ														3											10
27	(United States) Steve Wise	Honda																	9	4							10
30	(Finland) Juha Tirinen	Husqvarna											5	8													9
30	(Finland) Seppo Isomaki	Husqvarna											7	6													9
30	(Czech Republic) Josef Chara	ČZ													7	6											9
33	(Austria) Gerhard Huber	Can-Am		9											9	7											8
33	(Soviet Union) Juri Semko	ČZ							9		6																8
33	(Belgium) Gérard Camal	Suzuki							10			9												6			8
36	(Italy) Sergio Franco	Simonini				5																					6
36	(United Kingdom) Peter Mathia	Suzuki								10								7								10	6
36	(Czech Republic) Karel Kasten	ČZ													5												6
39	(Venezuela) Tomás Goinger	Suzuki															6										5
39	(France) Jean-Paul Hypolite	Kawasaki																6									5
39	(United States) Jimmy Ellis	Can-Am																	6								5
39	(Switzerland) Walter Kalberer	Husqvarna																							6		5
43	(United Kingdom) Brian Wade	Husqvarna					7																				4
43	(United States) Dan Turner	Yamaha																	7								4
43	(Switzerland) Joseph Loetscher	KTM																								7	4
46	(Belgium) Christian Timmermans	Yamaha							8																		3
46	(France) Jean-Claude Bontemps	Suzuki																8									3
46	(United States) Warren Reid	Honda																		8							3
49	(Netherlands) Jaak Verwaayen	Kawasaki									9																2
49	(Finland) Pekka Patjas	Suzuki											9														2
49	(Finland) Pekka Vanamo	Suzuki												9													2
49	(France) Jean-Marc Valat	Yamaha																9									2
49	(Japan) Masura Ikeda	Yamaha																		9							2
49	(West Germany) Emil Schwarz	Yamaha																							9		2
55	(Italy) Michele Rinaldi	TGM				10																					1
55	(Denmark) Ove Svendsen	Husqvarna										10															1
55	(Finland) Jari Louhivuori	KTM												10													1
55	(Netherlands) Marcel Deibergen	Aspès														10											1
55	(Denmark) John Andersen	Husqvarna																10									1
55	(United States) Danny LaPorte	Suzuki																		10							1
55	(France) Louis Jallat	Montesa																						10			1
