= Gennady Moiseyev =

Soviet motorcycle racer (1948–2017)

- Nationality: Russian
- Born: February 3, 1948 Vvedenskoye, Gatchinsky District, Leningrad Oblast, RSFSR, Soviet Union
- Died: July 23, 2017 (aged 69)

Motocross career
- Years active: 1967–1982
- Teams: ČZ, KTM
- Championships: 250cc – 1974, 1977, 1978
- Wins: 14

Gennady Anatolyevich Moiseyev (Russian: Генна́дий Анато́льевич Моисе́ев; February 3, 1948 – July 23, 2017) was a Russian Grand Prix motocross racer. He competed in the Motocross World Championships from 1967 to 1982. Moiseyev rode KTM motorcycles to three FIM 250cc Motocross World Championships in 1974, 1977 and 1978. He was the most accomplished Russian motocross racer of the 1970s however, his 1974 championship was clouded by controversy due to the blocking and rough riding tactics used by the Soviet team to help him secure the championship. He later served as the President of the Russian Motorcycle Federation.

== Motorcycle racing career ==
Moiseyev was born in the Gatchinsky District of the Leningrad Oblast. After he witnessed the 1964 Motocross World Championship round held in Leningrad, he decided to take up the sport of motocross. That same year, he was admitted to the motocross section of the Leningrad Pioneers Palace.

Moiseyev competed in his first Motocross World Championship event at the 1967 250cc Russian Grand Prix in Belgorod riding a ČZ motorcycle. He came to international prominence at the 1968 250cc Dutch Grand Prix with an impressive fourth place finish behind Joël Robert (ČZ), Olle Pettersson (Suzuki) and Sylvain Geboers (ČZ). At the 1968 Motocross des Nations event held in Chișinău, Moldova, Moiseyev finished the first heat race in fifth place to help the Soviet team secure their first victory at the team event. In 1970, Moiseyev was the Russian 250cc Motocross National Champion.

Moiseyev scored his first podium position at the 1972 250cc Dutch Grand Prix. He finished fifth in the first heat race in Holland then defeated Suzuki teammates Joël Robert and Sylvain Geboers to win the second heat race to finish the Grand Prix third overall. During the 1972 season, the Soviet team signed an agreement with the Austrian KTM motorcycle company for a supply of motocross bikes. Russian rider Pavel Rulev received the first KTM at mid-season while Moiseyev didn't switch to the KTM until the final race of the year in Switzerland. He rode the KTM to win the second heat race at the Swiss Grand Prix ahead of Håkan Andersson (Yamaha) and Arne Kring (Husqvarna). At the 1972 Trophée des Nations event in Genk, Belgium, Moiseyev placed third in the first heat race behind Roger De Coster and Heikki Mikkola, along with an 8th place in the second heat race to help the Soviet team finish the team competition in third place behind the Belgian and Czech teams.

Moiseyev won the first overall victory of his career at the 1973 250cc Yugoslavian Grand Prix where he defeated championship contender Heikki Mikkola (Husqvarna). He finished the season ranked fifth in the 250cc world championship. At the 1973 Trophée des Nations event in Dodington Park, England, Moiseyev placed fourth in the first heat race to help the Soviet team finish in second place behind the Belgian team.

In the 1974 season, Moiseyev and ČZ factory team rider, Jaroslav Falta. would engage in a season long battle for the 250cc World Championship that wasn't decided until the final race of the season in Switzerland. At the 250cc Swiss Grand Prix, Falta took the lead in the first heat race and appeared to be heading for victory while Moiseyev was struggling with a rear suspension failure. When Falta came upon the slowing Russian rider and tried to pass him, Moiseyev obstructed his path allowing second and third place riders, Harry Everts (Puch) and Håkan Andersson (Yamaha) to catch up. At one point Falta attempted to pass Moiseyev, but the Russian rider collided with him causing him to fall off his bike. Falta was quickly able to remount but, finished the race in third place, losing some more points to Moiseyev. Falta now had to win the final moto to have any chance to claim the world championship.

As the race began, Falta once again jumped into the lead. Moiseyev was forced to retire on the seventh lap with mechanical problems. A win looked certain, but Falta came upon two Russian riders, Victor Popenko and Eugeny Rybaltchenko, and both appeared to attempt to block Falta's passing attempts. Falta continued to pressure the two riders, and during another passing attempt, Rybaltchenko rode into him, knocking the Czech rider down. Falta remounted in third place, and race officials waved the black flag at the two Russian riders, disqualifying them from the race. Falta was able to catch up and pass Everts and Gaston Rahier to recapture the lead and win the race. This apparently clinched the world championship for Falta. However, two hours after the conclusion of the race, the FIM received a protest from the Soviet team, alleging Falta had jumped the start. FIM jury officials ultimately sided with the Russian team and instituted a one-minute penalty on Falta. The penalty dropped him to eighth place, handing the world championship to Moiseyev and relegating Falta to second place in the final standings.

At the 1974 Motocross des Nations event in Huskvarna, Sweden, Moiseyev placed third in the first heat race behind Bengt Åberg and Roger De Coster, along with a 5th place in the second heat race to help the Soviet team finish the team competition in third place behind the Swedish and American teams.

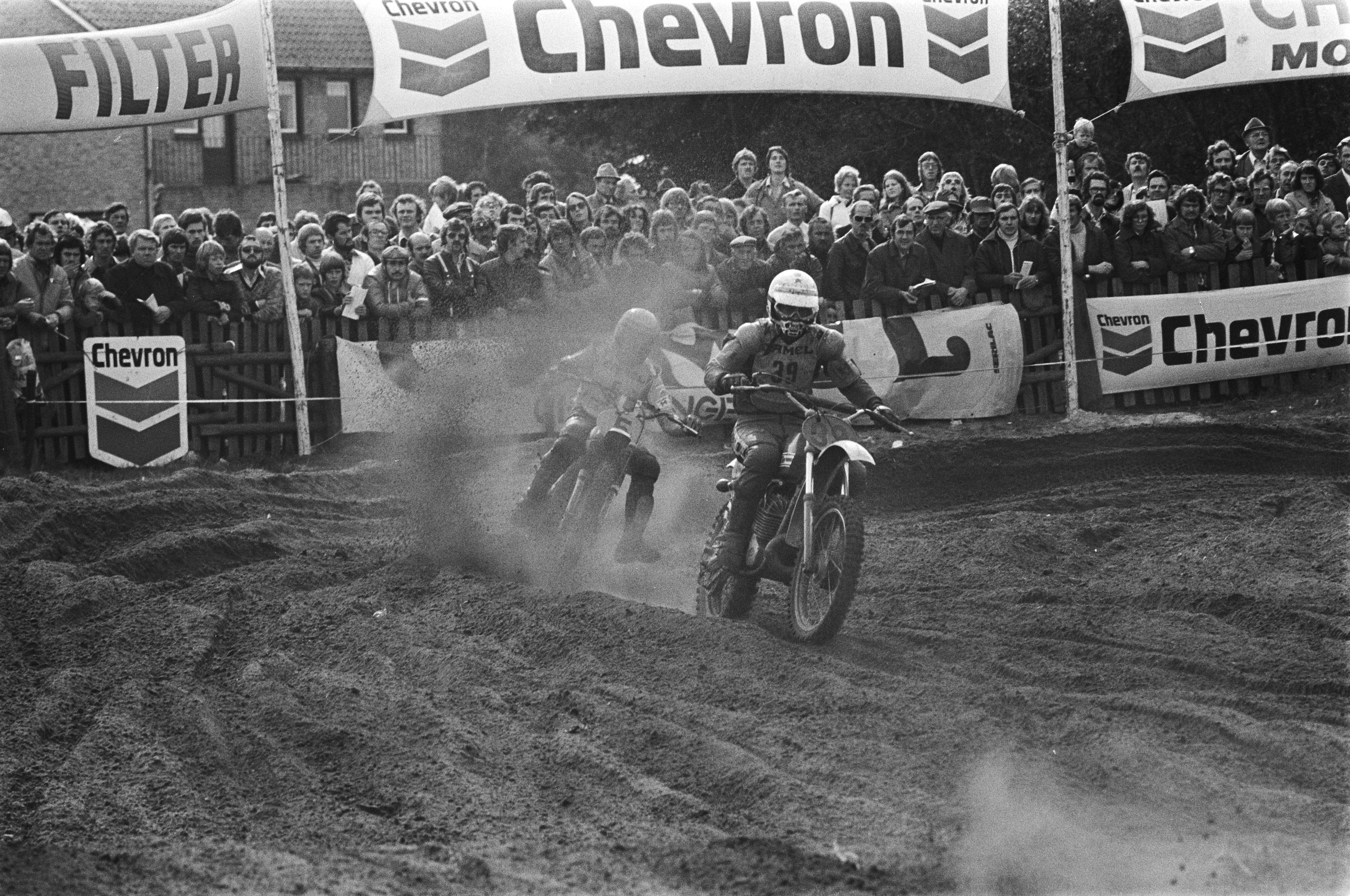
Moiseyev leads Roger De Coster at the 1976 Motocross des Nations held in Sint Anthonis, Netherlands

After missing the first half of the 1975 season due to injury, Moiseyev dropped to 12th in the 250cc world championship, although he managed a victory over the eventual World Champion, Harry Everts (Puch), in the first heat race of the 1975 250cc Finnish Grand Prix. In 1976, he narrowly lost the 250cc world championship by one point to Mikkola despite missing the first two races of the season. Mikkola had built a 40-point lead over Moiseyev until he suffered an injury at the 250cc British Grand Prix. Moiseyev then won three of the last five Grand Prix races of the year to close the point gap, but Mikkola managed to win the world championship by a narrow one-point margin.

At the 1976 Trophée des Nations event in Wohlen, Switzerland, Moiseyev finished the first heat race in second place behind Roger De Coster helping the Soviet team finish the team competition in second place behind the Belgian team. One week later at the 1976 Motocross des Nations event in Sint Anthonis, Holland, Moiseyev defeated the reigning World Champion, De Coster to win the first heat race as the Soviet team finished the team competition in fourth place.

Moiseyev won his second 250cc World Championship in 1977, this time without controversy as he dominated the season by winning 6 of the 12 Grand Prix races that year. Although he only won one Grand Prix race in the 1978 season, he successfully defended his title and clinched the third 250cc World Championship of his career. He was a member of the winning Russian team in the 1978 Motocross des Nations held in Gaildorf, West Germany.

Moiseyev final race victory came at the 1979 250cc Bulgarian Grand Prix. He scored a third place and a fourth place at the 1979 Trophée des Nations event in Barkarby, Sweden, as the Soviet team won the event for the first time. After the 1979 season, friction developed between the Soviet Motorcycling Federation and the KTM factory. As a result, KTM withdrew their support of the Russian team. The Soviet team continued racing with ČZ motorcycles for the 1980 season however, by then the Japanese motorcycle manufacturers had begun to open a technological gap over the European manufacturers and the ČZ motorcycles were no longer competitive.

Moiseyev competed in his final World Championship race at the 1982 250cc Russian Grand Prix at the age of 34. He won 35 individual heat races and 14 Grand Prix overall victories during his career in the Motocross World Championships. His 14 Grand Prix victories are the most by a Russian competitor in the Motocross World Championships. He was a member of two victorious Soviet Motocross des Nations teams (1968, 1978) and one victorious Soviet Trophée des Nations team (1979).

== Later life ==
Moiseyev, like many Soviet sports stars of his era, was enlisted in the Soviet Army, rising to the ranks of Major during his racing career. His extreme fitness combined with team tactics made him a fearsome competitor. After retiring from competition, Moiseyev became a motocross coach. In 1977, Moiseyev was awarded the Order of the Red Banner of Labour and, in 1978 he was given the honorary title of "Honored Master of Sports." In December 2000, he was elected president of the Russian Motorcycle Federation. He died on July 23, 2017.

== Motocross Grand Prix Results ==
Points system from 1952 to 1968:

Position	1st	2nd	3rd	4th	5th	6th
Points	8	6	4	3	2	1

Points system from 1969 to 1980:

Position	1	2	3	4	5	6	7	8	9	10
Points	15	12	10	8	6	5	4	3	2	1

Year	Class	Team	1		2		3		4		5		6		7		8		9		10		11		12		13		14		Pos	Pts
Year	Class	Team	R1	R2	R1	R2	R1	R2	R1	R2	R1	R2	R1	R2	R1	R2	R1	R2	R1	R2	R1	R2	R1	R2	R1	R2	R1	R2	R1	R2	Pos	Pts
1967	250cc	ČZ	ESP -	ESP -	CH -	CH -	FRA -	FRA -	BEL -	BEL -	GER -	GER -	NED -	NED -	ITA -	ITA -	UK -	UK -	SWE -	SWE -	FIN -	FIN -	USR; 8	USR; 3	POL -	POL -					10th	4
1968	250cc	ČZ	ESP -	ESP -	BEL; 21	BEL; 11	CZE; 9	CZE; 12	FRA; 12	FRA; 19	NED; 5	NED; 5	GER; 12	GER; 10	LUX; 14	LUX; 13	POL; 5	POL -	USR -	USR -	YUG -	YUG -	FIN -	FIN -	SWE -	SWE -	UK -	UK -	AUT -	AUT -	15th	5
1969	250cc	ČZ	ESP; 14	ESP; 12	CH -	CH -	YUG; 8	YUG -	CZE -	CZE; 4	POL; 7	POL; 7	GER -	GER -	NED -	NED -	FRA; 9	FRA; 18	UK -	UK -	SWE; 11	SWE; 5	FIN; 5	FIN; 10	USR; 9	USR; 3					10th	27
1970	250cc	ČZ	ESP -	ESP -	FRA -	FRA -	BEL -	BEL -	YUG; 3	YUG; 9	ITA -	ITA -	USR -	USR; 6	POL; 9	POL; 4	UK -	UK -	FIN; 8	FIN -	GDR; 6	GDR; 16	CH -	CH -	AUT -	AUT -					15th	10
1971	250cc	ČZ	ESP; 2	ESP -	CH; 3	CH -	POL; 3	POL -	GER; 9	GER; 5	YUG; 9	YUG -	ITA; 7	ITA; 8	NED -	NED -	GDR; 10	GDR; 4	FIN; 8	FIN -	SWE -	SWE -	UK; 6	UK -	AUT -	AUT -					15th	12
1972	250cc	ČZ	ESP; 3	ESP -	FRA; 5	FRA; 4	NED; 5	NED; 1	CZE; 9	CZE -	YUG; 6	YUG -	GER -	GER -	POL -	POL -	USR -	USR; 6	FIN -	FIN -	SWE -	SWE -	UK; 19	UK; 9	CH -	CH -					11th	38
1972	250cc	KTM	ESP -	ESP -	FRA -	FRA -	NED -	NED -	CZE -	CZE -	YUG -	YUG -	GER -	GER -	POL -	POL -	USR -	USR -	FIN -	FIN -	SWE -	SWE -	UK -	UK -	CH; 6	CH; 1					11th	38
1973	250cc	KTM	ESP -	ESP -	ITA; 2	ITA -	BEL; 4	BEL -	CH -	CH -	POL; 2	POL; 2	YUG; 1	YUG; 3	FRA; 2	FRA -	FIN -	FIN; 2	USR; 4	USR -	SWE -	SWE -	AUT; 3	AUT; 6							5th	104
1974	250cc	KTM	ESP; 4	ESP; 1	ITA -	ITA; 2	CZE; 6	CZE -	POL; 1	POL; 1	YUG -	YUG; 2	UK; 3	UK; 3	GER; 2	GER -	NED; 6	NED; 5	FIN; 10	FIN; 1	SWE; 5	SWE; 1	CH -	CH -							1st	145
1975	250cc	KTM	ESP -	ESP -	AUT -	AUT -	BEL -	BEL -	CZE -	CZE -	POL -	POL -	YUG -	YUG; 5	GER; 9	GER; 5	UK -	UK -	FRA -	FRA -	SWE; 7	SWE; 7	FIN; 1	FIN -	CH; 4	CH -					12th	45
1976	250cc	KTM	ESP -	ESP -	BEL -	BEL -	CZE; 4	CZE; 4	POL; 2	POL; 7	USR; 1	USR -	YUG; 1	YUG; 3	ITA; 2	ITA; 1	FRA -	FRA -	UK; 1	UK; 1	GER -	GER -	NED -	NED; 1	SWE; 1	SWE; 1					2nd	162
1977	250cc	KTM	ESP; 2	ESP; 9	CH; 3	CH; 2	BEL; 1	BEL; 1	CZE -	CZE -	ITA; 1	ITA; 1	AUT; 1	AUT -	USR; 1	USR; 1	YUG; 9	YUG; 6	GER; 1	GER -	UK; 1	UK; 1	SWE; 3	SWE; 2	FIN; 1	FIN; 1					1st	245
1978	250cc	KTM	ESP -	ESP; 4	ITA; 10	ITA; 1	CZE; 4	CZE; 2	YUG; 3	YUG; 1	AUT; 2	AUT; 5	GER -	GER -	UK; 1	UK; 1	FRA; 3	FRA; 4	USA -	USA; 5	SWE; 1	SWE -	FIN -	FIN; 3	USR; 1	USR; 9					1st	183
1979	250cc	KTM	ESP -	ESP; 6	NED; 2	NED; 3	ITA -	ITA; 2	BEL; 2	BEL; 3	YUG -	YUG -	CZE; 3	CZE -	POL -	POL -	FRA -	FRA -	FIN; 8	FIN; 5	USA; 4	USA; 4	GER -	GER -	BUL; 1	BUL; 1					4th	126
1980	250cc	ČZ	ESP -	ESP -	CZE -	CZE; 6	GER -	GER -	BEL; 2	BEL -	POL -	POL; 9	USR -	USR -	UK -	UK; 3	FRA; 4	FRA -	NED -	NED -	USA -	USA -	FIN -	FIN -	SWE -	SWE -					16th	37
1981	250cc	ČZ	FRA -	FRA -	ESP -	ESP -	AUT -	AUT -	ITA -	ITA -	CZE -	CZE -	BUL -	BUL -	CH -	CH; 8	UK; 10	UK; 10	GER -	GER -	USA -	USA -	USR; 10	USR -	NED -	NED -					34th	6
1982	250cc	ČZ	CH -	CH -	ESP -	ESP -	BEL -	BEL -	CZE -	CZE; 8	ITA -	ITA -	FRA -	FRA -	UK -	UK -	NED -	NED -	USR -	USR; 10	USA -	USA -	FIN -	FIN -	SWE -	SWE -					34th	4
