= Jaroslav Falta =

Czechoslovak motocross racer (1951–2022)

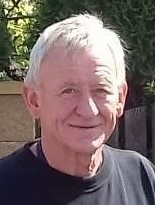
- Jaroslav Falta in 2018
- Nationality: Czech
- Born: 22 March 1951 Rumburk, Czechoslovakia
- Died: 27 March 2022 (aged 71)

Motocross career
- Years active: 1971–1982
- Teams: CZ
- Wins: 4

Jaroslav Falta (22 March 1951 – 27 March 2022) was a Czech professional motocross racer. He competed in the Motocross World Championships from 1971 to 1982.

As a member of the ČZ factory racing team, Falta was one of the top motocross racers of the early 1970s in the F.I.M. 250cc Motocross World Championship, and is also a five-time Czechoslovak Motocross Champion.

== Motorcycle racing career ==
Falta was born on 22 March 1951 in Rumburk in Czechoslovakia (today in the Czech Republic) near the East Germany border. He grew up in the nearby Jiříkov. After joining the ČZ factory racing team, he scored the first World Championship points of his career at the 1971 250cc Swiss Grand Prix. He won the first Grand Prix race of his career at the 1972 250cc British Grand Prix.

Falta very nearly claimed the 1974 250cc world championship, however it was Soviet rider, Guennady Moisseev, who would ultimately secure the crown in a controversy-filled final race of the season. The 1974 250cc world championship was a season-long battle between KTM's Moisseev and CZ's Falta. Moisseev won the first race of the season and took the overall victory at the season opening Spanish Grand Prix. Falta won both races at the Italian Grand Prix followed with a win in the first moto of his home Grand Prix in Czechoslovakia but, then suffered two breakdowns in Poland while Moisseev won both races. Falta won a moto in Yugoslavia and at the halfway point of the season, he trailed the Russian rider by 20 points. Each rider took a second place at the West German Grand Prix but, Falta won a moto at the Dutch Grand Prix to close the points gap to 5 points going into the final race of the season in Switzerland.

At the final event of the 1974 season, Falta took the lead in the first moto and appeared to be heading for victory while Moisseev was struggling with rear suspension failure. When Falta came upon the slowing Russian rider and tried to pass him, the KTM rider made an attempt to obstruct him allowing second and third place riders, Harry Everts and Håkan Andersson to catch up. At one point Falta attempted to pass Moisseev, but the Russian rider collided with him causing him to fall off his bike. Falta was quickly able to remount but, finished the race in third place, losing some more points to Moisseev. Falta now had to win the final moto to have any chance to claim the world championship. As the race began, Falta once again jumped into the lead. Moisseev was forced to retire on the seventh lap with mechanical problems. A win looked certain, but Falta came upon two Russian riders, Victor Popenko and Eugeny Rybaltchenko, and both appeared to attempt to block Falta's passing attempts. Falta continued to pressure the two riders, and during another passing attempt, Rybaltchenko rode into him, knocking the Czech rider down. Falta remounted in third place, and race officials waved the black flag at the two Russian riders, disqualifying them from the race. Falta was able to catch up and pass Everts and Gaston Rahier to recapture the lead and win the race. This apparently clinched the world championship for Falta. However, two hours after the conclusion of the race, the FIM received a protest from the Russian team, alleging Falta had jumped the start. FIM jury officials ultimately sided with the Russian team and instituted a one-minute penalty on Falta. The penalty dropped him to eighth place, handing the world championship to Moisseev and relegating Falta to second place in the final standings.

Falta competed in his final World Championship race at the 1982 250cc Spanish Grand Prix at the age of 31. He won 16 individual heat races and 4 Grand Prix victories during his world championship racing career. He was a 250cc Motocross Vice Champion (1974) and a five-time Czechoslovak Motocross National Champion (1970, 1977-1980). Falta was a member of three Czechoslovak Trophée des Nations teams (1971-1973) and two Motocross des Nations teams (1976, 1978). Although Falta failed to win the world championship, he showed impressive ability when he defeated three-time 500cc world champion Roger De Coster to win the 1974 Super Bowl of Motocross at the Los Angeles Coliseum.

Falta is noted for his loyalty to the Czech bikes he raced, and helped illustrate to the world that the CZ marquee were winning machines by scoring four Grand Prix victories against the world's best riders, such as Harry Everts, Joel Robert, Guennady Moiseev, Hakan Andersson and Gaston Rahier. Additionally, in 1974, Falta traveled to the United States, and raced selected Inter-AMA events with his teammate Zdenek Velky, and their trainer Hrebecek. To the surprise of many in attendance, Falta would clinch a victory in Los Angeles Coliseum in front of approximately 65,000 motocross fans.

Falta is somewhat of a motocross hero, and proved inspirational to many riders and a model to follow for many fans. Michel Turk, President of Motor-Union Luxembourg, admitted: "With his win in Los Angeles, Jaroslav Falta gave me the "last kick" to decide that I wanted to be a motocross racer in 1975. I want to thank Jaroslav for the wonderful time he has given me. I admire him very much and I want to thank Jaroslav for being my hero for many years as a young boy, and I hope to meet him somewhere in a near future."

Several publications in the Czech Republic narrate Falta's career, including the book Ukradený titul written by Ivo Helikar, sport editor of CMN and the son of one of Falta's trainers, František Helikar. There are also English versions, thanks to the translation of Martina Faltová, Jaroslav's daughter. Falta lived in a small village outside Prague. He continued to be in touch with motocross, restoring old bikes and occasionally visiting motocross races. He has been a visitor at past Grand Prixs held in Loket in the Czech Republic.

== Motocross Grand Prix Results ==
Points system from 1969 to 1980:

Position	1	2	3	4	5	6	7	8	9	10
Points	15	12	10	8	6	5	4	3	2	1

Year	Class	Team	1		2		3		4		5		6		7		8		9		10		11		12		Pos	Pts
Year	Class	Team	R1	R2	R1	R2	R1	R2	R1	R2	R1	R2	R1	R2	R1	R2	R1	R2	R1	R2	R1	R2	R1	R2	R1	R2	Pos	Pts
1971	250cc	ČZ	ESP -	ESP -	CH; 8	CH; 10	POL -	POL -	GER; 3	GER; 7	YUG; 3	YUG; 7	ITA; 6	ITA; 6	NED; 9	NED -	GDR; 9	GDR; 7	FIN -	FIN -	SWE -	SWE -	UK; 13	UK -	AUT; 7	AUT; 3	9th	36
1972	250cc	ČZ	ESP -	ESP -	FRA; 2	FRA; 26	NED -	NED; 9	TCH -	TCH -	YUG -	YUG; 9	GER; 3	GER -	POL; 6	POL; 4	USR; 9	USR; 5	FIN; 6	FIN; 5	SWE; 9	SWE; 8	UK; 1	UK; 2	CH -	CH -	9th	39
1973	250cc	ČZ	ESP; 7	ESP -	ITA -	ITA; 3	BEL -	BEL; 6	CH; 4	CH; 4	POL; 5	POL; 4	YUG -	YUG; 2	FRA -	FRA -	FIN; 6	FIN; 6	USR; 5	USR -	SWE; 8	SWE -	AUT; 6	AUT; 4			6th	86
1974	250cc	ČZ	ESP -	ESP; 3	ITA; 1	ITA; 1	TCH -	TCH; 1	POL -	POL -	YUG -	YUG; 1	UK; 4	UK; 7	GER -	GER; 2	NED -	NED; 1	FIN; 2	FIN -	SWE -	SWE; 4	CH; 3	CH; 8			2nd	139
1975	250cc	ČZ	ESP; 5	ESP; 8	AUT; 1	AUT; 1	BEL -	BEL -	TCH -	TCH; 1	POL -	POL -	YUG -	YUG -	GER -	GER -	UK -	UK -	FRA -	FRA -	SWE -	SWE -	FIN -	FIN -	CH -	CH -	11th	54
1976	250cc	ČZ	ESP -	ESP -	BEL; 1	BEL; 5	TCH; 5	TCH; 1	POL -	POL -	USR -	USR; 6	YUG -	YUG -	ITA; 8	ITA; 8	FRA -	FRA -	UK; 10	UK -	GER -	GER -	NED -	NED -	SWE -	SWE -	10th	54
1977	250cc	ČZ	ESP; 6	ESP; 2	CH -	CH -	BEL -	BEL -	TCH -	TCH; 1	ITA; 10	ITA; 6	AUT; 6	AUT; 6	USR; 3	USR -	YUG -	YUG -	GER; 8	GER -	UK -	UK -	SWE; 10	SWE -	FIN -	FIN; 9	9th	64
1978	250cc	ČZ	ESP -	ESP; 9	ITA -	ITA; 4	TCH -	TCH -	YUG; 7	YUG; 4	AUT; 1	AUT; 2	GER -	GER; 6	UK -	UK -	FRA -	FRA -	USA; 8	USA -	SWE; 7	SWE -	FIN -	FIN -	USR -	USR -	9th	61
1979	250cc	ČZ	ESP; 1	ESP; 5	NED -	NED -	ITA; 6	ITA; 7	BEL -	BEL -	YUG; 7	YUG -	TCH; 4	TCH -	POL -	POL -	FRA -	FRA -	FIN; 5	FIN -	USA -	USA -	GER -	GER -	BUL; 3	BUL -	10th	58
1980	250cc	ČZ	ESP -	ESP; 1	TCH; 1	TCH; 4	GER; 6	GER; 7	BEL -	BEL; 2	POL; 10	POL -	USR; 8	USR; 5	UK -	UK -	FRA -	FRA -	NED -	NED -	USA -	USA -	FIN; 10	FIN; 3	SWE -	SWE -	7th	80
1982	250cc	ČZ	CH; 10	CH -	ESP; 3	ESP -	BEL -	BEL -	TCH -	TCH -	ITA -	ITA -	FRA -	FRA -	UK -	UK -	NED -	NED -	USR -	USR -	USA -	USA -	FIN -	FIN -	SWE -	SWE -	23rd	11
