= Heikki Mikkola =

Finnish motorcycle racer (born 1945)

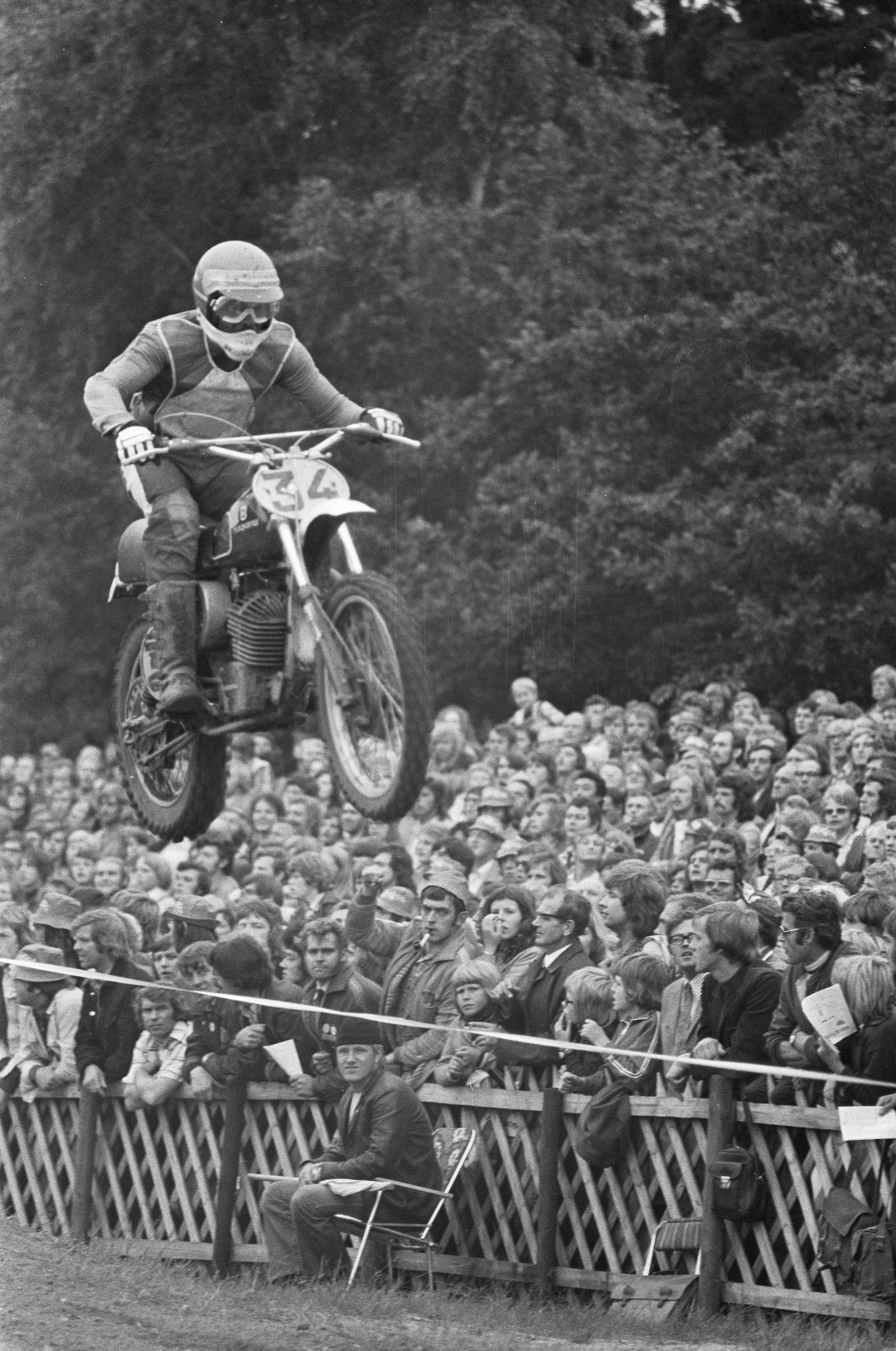
- Nationality: Finnish
- Born: 6 July 1945 (age 81) Mikkeli, Finland

Motocross career
- Years active: 1967–1979
- Teams: Husqvarna, Yamaha
- Championships: 500cc – 1974, 1977, 1978; 250cc – 1976
- Wins: 34

Heikki Antero Mikkola (born 6 July 1945) is a Finnish former professional motocross racer and motocross team manager. He competed in the Motocross World Championships from 1967 to 1979, most prominently as a member of the Husqvarna factory racing team where he became the first competitor to win both the 250cc and 500cc world championships.

During the 1970s, Mikkola challenged perennial champion Roger De Coster for supremacy of the 500cc motocross world championships. After 12 seasons racing for Husqvarna, he joined the Yamaha factory racing team where he won two more 500cc world championships. As with many Finns involved in racing activities, he was nicknamed the Flying Finn and, was known for his trademark goatee beard and his fierce mien.

After his racing career, Mikkola became a Yamaha race team manager. In 2006, Mikkola was inducted into the AMA Motorcycle Hall of Fame and, in 2015, he was named an FIM Legend for his motorcycle racing achievements.

== Motocross career ==
=== Early life ===
Mikkola was born in Mikkeli, Finland. Shortly after he was born, his family moved to Sajaniemi in the municipality of Loppi where his father worked as a state employed gamekeeper. In his youth, he was an active participant in sports such as track and field, cross-country skiing, ski jumping and Pesäpallo, a bat-and-ball game. He considered pursuing a competitive ski jumping career however, there were few ski jumping facilities near his home so, he focused on motorcycle racing instead. He held a summer job loading tree stumps onto trailers which greatly improved his physical conditioning. In high school, he took car mechanic courses and, after graduating in 1963 he worked as a truck mechanic for a Bedford Vehicles distributor.

=== Racing roots ===
Mikkola first became involved in motorcycling through his childhood friend Martti Pesonen, who later competed internationally in Grand Prix road racing. In 1963, Pesonen loaned his Greeves motorcycle to Mikkola so that he could enter his first race in which he crashed entering the first corner but, recovered to finish in sixth place. The motocross courses near his hometown were constructed in sandy soil which, are known to be some of the hardest courses to ride because of the strength-sapping efforts needed to ride over the soft terrain. Learning to ride on sand tracks allowed Mikkola to develop impressive physical stamina. When Pesonen bought a new motorcycle in 1963, he sold his old Greeves to Mikkola.

Mikkola began racing motocross in 1964 and won the Finnish Junior Championship in the first year riding a Husqvarna. He also competed in motorcycle ice racing alongside Pesonen as well as Jarno Saarinen and Teuvo Länsivuori. In 1965 he finished fourth in the 250cc Finnish ice racing championship, behind Saarinen, Länsivuori and Pesonen. He entered the Finnish army in 1965 and served for ten months as a tank mechanic.

Mikkola competed in the Senior class in 1965 but suffered a broken wrist. In 1966 he finished third in the 250cc Finnish ice racing championship, behind Länsivuori and Pesonen. He finished the 1966 Senior motocross championship in third place and won the Finnish junior enduro championship. He also entered his first world championship race in the 1966 250cc Finnish Grand Prix where he finished the first moto in 13th place. His wrist injury seemed slow to heal and, Mikkola contemplated ending his motocross racing career and starting an auto repair garage with a friend however, exercises developed by a weight lifter helped his wrist heal so that he was able to race again.

In 1967, Mikkola finished second in the Finnish Senior championship and won the 1967 Finnish ice racing championship. At the 1967 250cc Finnish Grand Prix, Mikkola finished in an impressive sixth place against a field of top rated competitors. Despite his early racing successes, Mikkola's modest income as a truck mechanic meant that he could only afford to compete in regional races.

Mikkola repeated his sixth-place result in the 1968 250cc Finnish Grand Prix and, then scored a second place in the 250cc Swedish Grand Prix, defeating the reigning world champion, Torsten Hallman in the second moto. After his impressive finish at the 1968 Swedish Grand Prix, he began to receive support from the Husqvarna factory in the form of spare parts at discounted prices.

When his fellow Finnish motocross racer Kalevi Vehkonen decided to compete in the 1969 250cc Motocross World Championships, Mikkola decided to join him. Despite the support from the Husqvarna factory, he still had to serve as his own mechanic and drive his own van to races throughout Europe along with his wife and young daughter. He finished the season ranked 14th in the world as a privateer rider.

That winter Mikkola showed his versatility by winning the 1970 Finnish 350cc snowmobile championship. He surged to prominence in the 1970 FIM Motocross World Championship when he won three of the last four Grand Prix races to finish fourth in the 250cc world championship behind Joël Robert, Sylvain Geboers and Roger De Coster. At the 1970 Trophée des Nations team event for 250cc motorcycles, Mikkola was the second highest individual points scorer behind Belgium's Sylvain Geboers to help the Finnish team finish third overall behind the Belgian and Czechoslovak teams. His impressive performance at the end of the 1970 seasoned earned him a contract to join the Husqvarna factory team which, enabled him to quit his job as a truck mechanic to focus entirely on his racing career.

=== Husqvarna sponsorship ===
In the 1971 season, Mikkola won the 250cc West German Grand Prix and was leading the championship after the first four races however, he experienced engine failures in four successive races to fall out of contention and once again place fourth in the series final points standings. After the world championship season ended, Mikkola participated in the 1971 Trans-AMA motocross series to help establish the sport of motocross in the United States. He took two victories and finished the series in sixth place.

Mikkola moved up to the premier 500cc class in 1972 as Bengt Aberg's teammate and won the Swiss and Czechoslovak Grand Prix races. He finished the championship in third place behind Roger De Coster and Paul Friedrichs despite Aberg receiving preferential treatment from the Husqvarna team. After the world championship season ended, he placed third in the 1972 Trans-AMA motocross series.

Prior to the 1973 season, Mikkola held discussions with Yamaha's European racing manager, Rodney Gould, about developing a new Yamaha race bike but, when Yamaha hesitated, he re-signed with the Husqvarna team to compete in the 250cc motocross world championship. That season, Yamaha introduced its new single shock absorber rear suspension that offered a significant advantage over the previous generation suspensions allowing Yamaha rider Håkan Andersson to dominate the championship. Mikkola would finish the season ranked third in the world behind Andersson and Adolf Weil. He returned to the United States after the world championship season and won the 1973 Inter-AMA Motocross series title.

Entering the 1974 FIM Motocross World Championship season, Aberg left the Husqvarna team to join the Bultaco team leaving Mikkola as their top rider. His main competition for the world championship came from the Suzuki factory teammates Gerrit Wolsink and defending world champion De Coster. Mikkola battled De Coster for the entire season as the two competitors won 17 out of 22 motos that season. Mikkola won the first four Grand Prix races of the season before, De Coster was able to win the Czechoslovak Grand Prix. While De Coster's Suzuki suffered mechanical breakdowns while he was leading five races, Mikkola's Husqvarna showed a perfect mechanical reliability by finishing every race. Mikkola credited much of his success to his Husqvarna factory mechanic, Per-Olaf Persson, whose meticulous preparation and maintenance greatly improved the reliability of his motorcycle.

Mikkola missed the German Grand Prix due to injuries suffered in practice, allowing De Coster to narrow his lead in the championship to 10 points going into the final two events of the season, meaning that De Coster would have to win three of the last four motos to secure his fourth consecutive 500cc world championship. The setting of the Belgian Grand Prix was a rugged, narrow track in the forests surrounding the picturesque hilltop Citadel of Namur. First held in 1947, the Namur Grand Prix was revered by motocross enthusiasts in the same manner that auto racing enthusiasts considered the Monaco Grand Prix to be the crown jewel of the Formula One season.

Wolsink took the lead at the start of the first race while Mikkola and De Coster battled their way to the front of the pack. When Wolsink's engine seized, the two series points leaders once again found themselves first and second with Mikkola holding on to the lead to the end of the race. De Coster had to win the final three races to overtake Mikkola for the championship. Wolsink once again grabbed the early lead in the second race but, soon crashed allowing De Coster into the lead with Mikkola in second place. De Coster continued to widen his lead to win the second moto to extend the championship points battle to the final race of the season in Luxembourg.

In the championship's final event at the Luxembourg Grand Prix, De Coster worked his way through the pack to take the lead before his Suzuki suffered an engine problem, forcing him out of the race and losing the world championship to Mikkola by nine points. De Coster was magnanimous in defeat, waiting for Mikkola to return to the pits to celebrate his victory with a bottle of champagne. De Coster declared that Mikkola deserved to win the world championship.

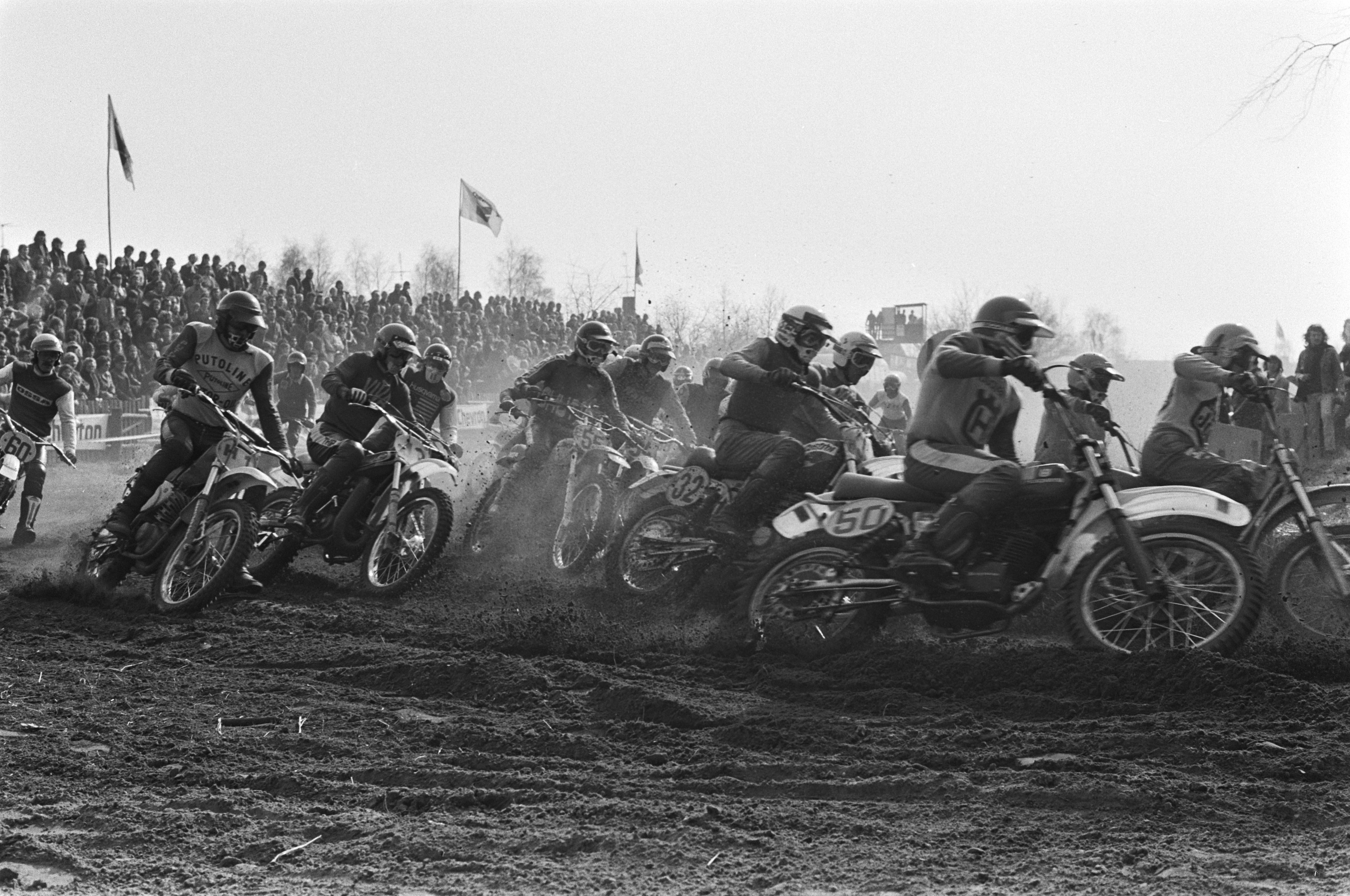
Mikkola (50) at the start of the 1976 500cc Motocross der Azen pre-season international race held at St. Anthonis, Holland

Honda offered Mikkola a contract to move to the United States and race in the 1975 AMA Motocross Championship however, Mikkola spoke little English and preferred to live closer to his family in Finland so, he re-signed with the Husqvarna team. Mikkola was injured in a pre-season accident and then, his Husqvarna suffered suspension problems during the season, allowing De Coster to reclaim the world championship with 12 moto victories. Mikkola finished second in the championship with 5 moto victories.

In 1976, the Husqvarna factory asked Mikkola to return to the 250cc class to promote sales of their new 250cc motorcycle. After a season long battle with KTM rider Guennady Moisseev, Mikkola was able to prevail by a narrow one point margin to claim the world championship. In the process, he became the first competitor to win a 250 cc and a 500 cc Motocross World Championship. His 1976 victory also marked the last Motocross World Championship for Husqvarna until Jacky Martens won the 500cc championship in 1993.

=== Move to Yamaha ===
When the Husqvarna factory announced that they would reduce their racing budget for the 1977 season, Mikkola knew it would be difficult to compete with the improving competition from the KTM factory. He visited the Puch factory to test ride their motorcycles but, he ultimately decided to sign a contract with the Yamaha factory racing team to help them challenge Suzuki's domination of the 500cc class. He claimed the 1977 500cc world championship with 12 moto victories, relegating De Coster to second place. He was even more dominant in the 1978 season, winning the championship over second place Brad Lackey with a record 299 points.

At the 1978 Motocross des Nations in Gaildorf, West Germany, Mikkola had the rare opportunity to compete against American rider, Bob Hannah, who was then near the peak of his racing career. The brash, outspoken Hannah told Mikkola that he (Hannah) was going to win the race. Mikkola replied, “Let's see if you ride as good as you talk.” In the first race, Hannah grabbed an early lead however, Mikkola overtook him and pulled away for the win. Mikkola repeated the performance in the second race, passing Hannah en route to his second victory of the day.

Mikkola suffered torn ligaments in his leg during pre-season practice and, the injury continued to affect his results during the 1979 season. After a fifth-place finish, Mikkola decided to retire at the age of 34.

== Motocross career overview ==
In a sixteen-year professional racing career, Mikkola won 65 individual heat races (47 500cc, 18 250cc) and 31 Grand Prix victories (24 500cc, 7 250cc). Along with his four World Championships (1974, 1976-1978), he was an eight-time Finnish Motocross National Champion (250cc: 1974-1976, 500cc: 1975-1979). Mikkola was a member of seven Finnish Motocross des Nations teams (1971-1976, 1978), and nine Finnish Trophée des Nations teams (1967-1973, 1975-1976). He was the top individual points scorer at the 1978 Motocross des Nations event held in Gaildorf, West Germany. Throughout his entire racing career, he represented the Hyvinkää Motor Club (Hyvinkään Moottorikerho – HyMk).

== Team manager and later life ==
After his racing career, Mikkola became the Yamaha Grand Prix motocross racing team manager helping Neil Hudson and Danny LaPorte win world championships until Yamaha withdrew from international racing activities in 1982. With his title winnings, he purchased a derelict farm at a foreclosure auction near his hometown in 1979. Together with his wife and children, he cleared the overgrown fields and renovated the farm buildings. In 1992, the family opened a farm store and bakery selling their produce directly to the public.

== Motocross Grand Prix Results ==
Points system from 1952 to 1968:

Position	1st	2nd	3rd	4th	5th	6th
Points	8	6	4	3	2	1

Points system from 1969 to 1980:

Position	1	2	3	4	5	6	7	8	9	10
Points	15	12	10	8	6	5	4	3	2	1

Year	Class	Team	1		2		3		4		5		6		7		8		9		10		11		12		13		14		15		Pos	Pts
Year	Class	Team	R1	R2	R1	R2	R1	R2	R1	R2	R1	R2	R1	R2	R1	R2	R1	R2	R1	R2	R1	R2	R1	R2	R1	R2	R1	R2	R1	R2	R1	R2	Pos	Pts
1966	250cc	Husqvarna	ESP -	ESP -	FRA -	FRA -	BEL -	BEL -	CH -	CH -	TCH -	TCH -	GER -	GER -	NED -	NED -	LUX -	LUX -	ITA -	ITA -	POL -	POL -	GDR -	GDR -	SWE -	SWE -	FIN; 13	FIN -	USR -	USR -	AUT -	AUT -	-	0
1967	250cc	Husqvarna	ESP -	ESP -	CH -	CH -	FRA -	FRA -	BEL -	BEL -	GER -	GER -	NED -	NED -	ITA -	ITA -	UK -	UK -	SWE -	SWE -	FIN -	FIN; 6	USR -	USR -	POL -	POL -							25th	1
1968	250cc	Husqvarna	ESP -	ESP -	BEL -	BEL -	TCH -	TCH -	FRA -	FRA -	NED -	NED -	GER -	GER -	LUX -	LUX -	POL -	POL -	USR -	USR -	YUG -	YUG -	FIN; 6	FIN -	SWE; 6	SWE; 1	UK -	UK -	AUT; 9	AUT -			10th	7
1969	250cc	Husqvarna	ESP -	ESP -	CH; 6	CH; 7	YUG; 7	YUG; 8	TCH -	TCH -	POL -	POL -	GER -	GER -	NED; 29	NED; 1	FRA; 6	FRA; 3	UK -	UK -	SWE -	SWE -	FIN -	FIN; 3	USR -	USR; 4							14th	16
1970	250cc	Husqvarna	ESP; 10	ESP; 12	FRA -	FRA -	BEL -	BEL -	YUG; 4	YUG; 3	ITA; 5	ITA; 6	USR; 2	USR; 9	POL -	POL -	UK; 5	UK; 6	FIN; 1	FIN; 2	GDR -	GDR -	CH; 2	CH; 1	AUT; 1	AUT; 1							4th	73
1971	250cc	Husqvarna	ESP -	ESP -	CH; 2	CH; 3	POL; 1	POL; 3	GER; 2	GER; 2	YUG -	YUG -	ITA; 2	ITA; 3	NED -	NED -	GDR -	GDR -	FIN -	FIN -	SWE; 2	SWE -	UK -	UK -	AUT; 3	AUT; 1							4th	63
1972	500cc	Husqvarna	AUT; 10	AUT; 6	CH; 1	CH; 1	SWE -	SWE -	FRA; 6	FRA; 5	USR; 3	USR; 5	TCH; 2	TCH; 3	UK; 5	UK -	GER -	GER -	GDR; 5	GDR; 5	BEL; 13	BEL; 5	LUX -	LUX -									3rd	61
1973	250cc	Husqvarna	ESP; 3	ESP -	ITA; 1	ITA -	BEL; 1	BEL; 2	CH -	CH; 3	POL; 3	POL -	YUG; 2	YUG; 4	FRA; 3	FRA; 3	FIN; 4	FIN; 3	USR; 2	USR; 2	SWE -	SWE; 3	AUT; 5	AUT; 1									3rd	143
1974	500cc	Husqvarna	AUT; 1	AUT; 1	FRA; 1	FRA; 1	ITA; 1	ITA; 2	DEN; 1	DEN; 2	TCH; 1	TCH -	GER -	GER -	UK -	UK; 3	USA; 4	USA; 2	NED; 1	NED -	BEL; 1	BEL; 2	LUX; 1	LUX; 6									1st	174
1975	500cc	Husqvarna	CH; 1	CH; 2	ITA; 3	ITA; 1	FIN; 2	FIN; 2	USR; 3	USR; 3	FRA; 2	FRA; 2	USA; 8	USA; 4	CAN; 3	CAN -	UK; 1	UK -	GER -	GER; 3	NED -	NED; 1	BEL; 1	BEL; 7	LUX -	LUX -							2nd	165
1976	250cc	Husqvarna	ESP; 1	ESP; 1	BEL; 2	BEL; 1	TCH -	TCH; 3	POL -	POL; 1	USR -	USR; 1	YUG; 2	YUG; 1	ITA; 3	ITA; 6	FRA -	FRA -	UK -	UK -	GER -	GER; 2	NED; 1	NED -	SWE; 2	GER -							1st	163
1977	500cc	Yamaha	AUT; 3	AUT; 5	NED; 1	NED; 1	SWE; 2	SWE; 1	FIN; 1	FIN; 1	GER; 1	GER; 2	ITA; 1	ITA; 2	USA; 4	USA; 1	CAN; 1	CAN; 3	UK; 1	UK -	BEL; 2	BEL; 1	LUX; 3	LUX; 1	CH -	CH -							1st	272
1978	500cc	Yamaha	CH; 1	CH; 1	AUT; 3	AUT; 6	FRA; 2	FRA; 1	DEN; 1	DEN; 1	FIN; 1	FIN; 1	SWE -	SWE; 1	USA; 3	USA; 1	ITA; 3	ITA; 1	UK; 1	UK; 3	BEL; 1	BEL; 1	LUX; 2	LUX; 1	NED; 3	NED; 3							1st	299
1979	500cc	Yamaha	AUT -	AUT -	FRA; 4	FRA; 3	SWE; 3	SWE; 2	ITA; 1	ITA; 1	USA -	USA; 2	CAN -	CAN -	GER -	GER -	UK -	UK; 5	CH; 1	CH; 1	NED; 3	NED; 3	BEL -	BEL -	LUX; 9	LUX; 4							5th	147
