= Gaillefontaine =

- Commune
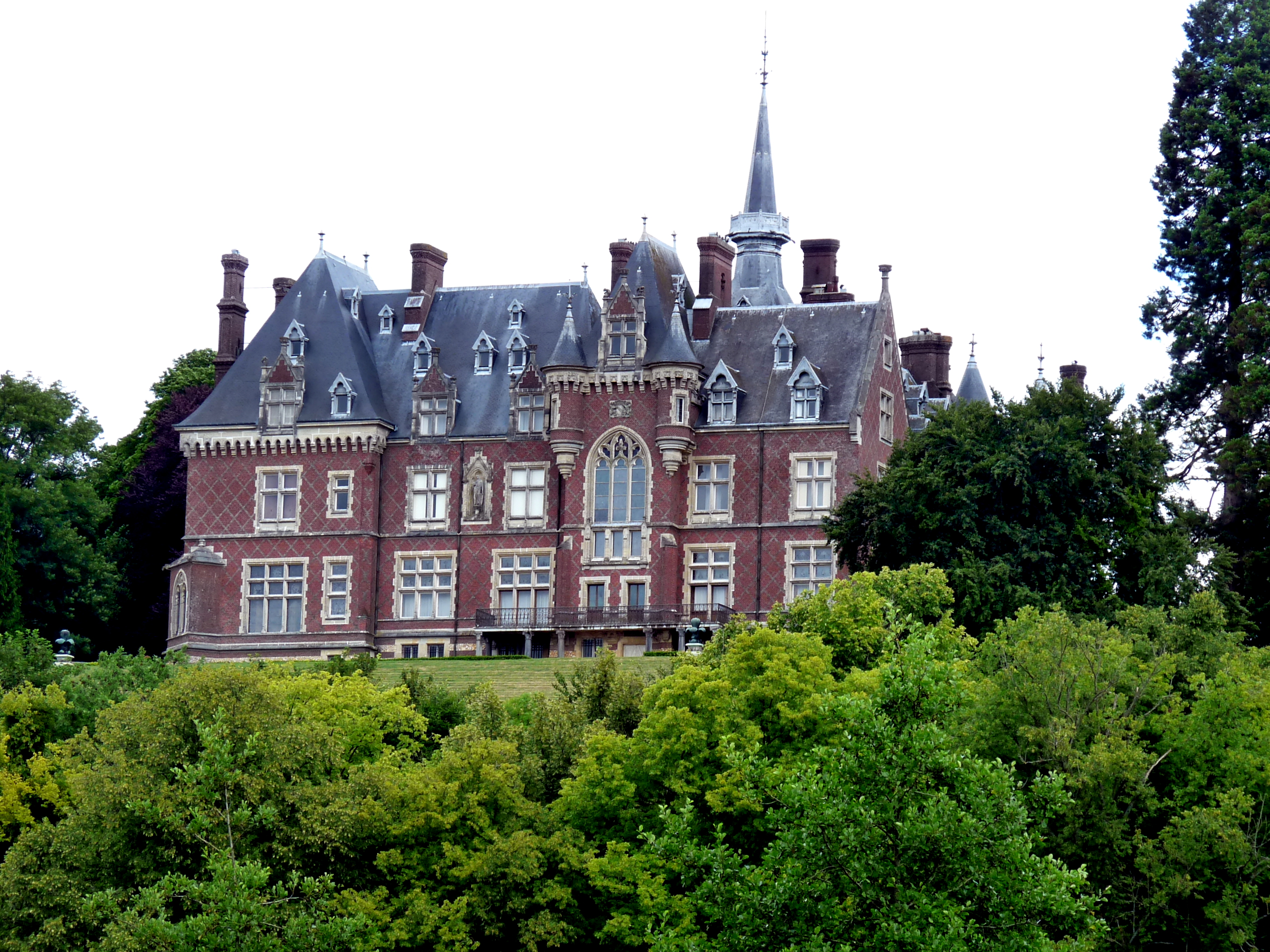
- The chateau in Gaillefontaine
- Location of Gaillefontaine
- Location within France Location within Normandy
- Coordinates: 49°39′16″N 1°37′01″E
- Country: France
- Region: Normandy
- Department: Seine-Maritime
- Arrondissement: Dieppe
- Canton: Gournay-en-Bray
- Intercommunality: CC 4 rivières

Government
  - Mayor (2026–32): Jean-Pierre Henry
- Area^{1}: 26.23 km^{2} (10.13 sq mi)
- Elevation: 246 m (807 ft)
- Highest elevation: 246 m (807 ft)
- Lowest elevation: 143 m (469 ft)
- Population (2023): 1,108
  - Density: 42.24/km^{2} (109.4/sq mi)
- Time zone: UTC+01:00 (CET)
  - Summer (DST): UTC+02:00 (CEST)
- INSEE/Postal code: 76295 /76870
- ^{1} French Land Register data, which excludes lakes, ponds, glaciers > 1 km^{2} (0.386 sq mi or 247 acres) and river estuaries.

Gaillefontaine (French pronunciation: [ɡajfɔ̃tɛn]) is a commune in the Seine-Maritime department in the Normandy region in northern France.

== Geography ==
A small town of farming, forestry and light industry situated by the banks of the river Béthune in the Pays de Bray, some 36 miles (58 km) southeast of Dieppe, at the junction of the D919, the D9 and the D135 roads.

== Population ==
Historical population
| Year | Pop. | ±% p.a. |
|---|---|---|
| 1968 | 1,452 | — |
| 1975 | 1,503 | +0.49% |
| 1982 | 1,373 | −1.28% |
| 1990 | 1,446 | +0.65% |
| 1999 | 1,460 | +0.11% |
| 2007 | 1,386 | −0.65% |
| 2012 | 1,272 | −1.70% |
| 2017 | 1,225 | −0.75% |
| 2023 | 1,108 | −1.66% |
Source: INSEE

== Places of interest ==
- The eleventh-century church of St.Jean-Baptiste at the hamlet of Noyers.
- The eleventh-century church of St.Maurice.
- The church of Notre-Dame, dating from the thirteenth century.
- Some 17th-century remains of the abbey.
- The remains of the 11th-century castle.
- The château at Saint-Maurice
- The château de Gaillefontaine, dating from the nineteenth century.
- Several old houses, dating from the sixteenth century.

== See also ==
- Communes of the Seine-Maritime department
