= Herbert Schmitz =

German motorcycle racer

- Nationality: German
- Born: 26 March 1947
- Died: 25 March 2019 (aged 71)

Motocross career
- Years active: 1971-1981
- Teams: Maico, Puch

Herbert Schmitz (26 March 1947 – 25 March 2019) was a German professional motocross racer. He competed in the FIM Motocross World Championships between 1971 and 1981, most prominently as a member of the Maico factory racing team. Along with Adolf Weil and Willy Bauer, he was one of the most accomplished West German motocross racers of the 1970s.

At the age of 24, Schmitz scored in his first Motocross World Championship points at the 1971 500cc West German Grand Prix riding a Maico motorcycle. The first victory of his career came when he finished ahead of five-time World Champion Roger De Coster (Suzuki) to win the first heat race of the 1978 500cc Swedish Grand Prix. At the next round held at the Carlsbad Raceway in the United States, he defeated De Coster in the first heat race and finished third in the second heat race to finish second overall to the eventual World Champion Heikki Mikkola (Yamaha). 1978 would mark the highpoint of Schmitz's career, finishing fourth in the FIM 500cc World Championship, behind only Mikkola, Brad Lackey, and De Coster.

Schmitz was a member of the German team that finished in second place behind the Russian team at the 1978 Motocross des Nations event. He competed in his final World Championship race at the 1981 500cc Austrian Grand Prix at the age of 33. After his racing career concluded, he became a regular participant in historic motorsport events.

Schmitz won two Grand Prix heat races during his career in the Motocross World Championships. He was a three-time German motocross national champion (1977–1979). He was also a member of six German teams at the Motocross des Nations (1975–1979, 1981) and four Trophée des Nations teams (1973, 1975, 1978, 1980).
