= Christer Hammargren =

Swedish former professional motocross racer

- Nationality: Swedish
- Born: 5 October 1944 (age 82)

Motocross career
- Years active: 1967 - 1976
- Teams: Husqvarna, Yamaha, Kawasaki
- Wins: 1

Christer Hammargren (born 5 October 1944) is a Swedish former professional motocross racer. He competed in the Motocross World Championships from 1967 to 1976. He was one of the top competitors in the Motocross Grand Prix World Championships finishing in the top ten for five consecutive seasons.

== Biography ==
Hammargren was born on 5 October 1944 in Vaggeryd, Jönköping County, Sweden. He grew up 30 kilometers from the Husqvarna motorcycle factory and idolized Swedish motocross champions such as Bill Nilsson, Rolf Tibblin and Torsten Hallman. At the age of 22, he made an impressive world championship debut as a privateer aboard a Husqvarna motorcycle at the 1967 500cc Swedish Grand Prix. Hammargren defeated former World Champions Jeff Smith (BSA) and Paul Friedrichs (ČZ) to win the first heat race, then placed fourth in the second heat race to finish second overall to Dave Bickers (ČZ). He ended the year ranked seventh in the 500cc Motocross World Championship.

Hammargren's impressive result earned him official support from the Husqvarna factory team in 1968. He finished second overall behind his Husqvarna teammate Åke Jonsson at the 500cc Swedish Grand Prix and finished the 1968 season ranked tenth in the world championship. At the Trophée des Nations team event held in Payerne, Switzerland on September 1, 1968, Hammargren's fourth place finish helped lead the Swedish team to victory ahead of a strong Belgian team led by 250cc World Champion Joël Robert (ČZ) and Roger De Coster (ČZ).

In 1969, Hammargren won the 500cc Swedish Motocross National Championship and scored a third-place finish at the 500cc Swedish Grand Prix behind his Husqvarna teammates Arne Kring and Bengt Åberg. He ended the year ranked ninth in the world championship. Hammargren won the first overall victory of his career at the 1970 500cc Swedish Grand Prix where he finished ahead of three-time World Champion Paul Friedrichs (ČZ). He finished the season ranked fifth in the 1970 500cc Motocross World Championship marking the best result of his career.

Hammargren was a member of the 1970 Swedish Motocross des Nations team that won the event for the first time since 1962. After the world championship season ended, he participated in the 1970 Inter-AM Motocross Series in the United States. The Inter-AM Motocross Series was established by the American distributor for Husqvarna motorcycles Edison Dye, as a pilot event to help establish the sport of motocross in the United States. He ended the series in third place behind his fellow Swedes Åke Jonsson (Maico) and Bengt Åberg (Husqvarna). He helped the Swedish team take their second consecutive Motocross des Nations victory at the 1971 event held in Vannes, France.

Hammargren joined the Yamaha factory racing team for the 1972 season alongside teammate Jaak van Velthoven. He placed ninth in the 1972 Trans-AMA motocross series in the United States. In 1973, Yamaha introduced a new and innovative rear suspension with a single shock absorber that would revolutionize the sport of motocross. In the wake of the 1973 oil crisis, sales of recreational vehicles decreased significantly, and Yamaha was forced to reduce their competition budget by withdrawing their motocross and road racing teams after the 1975 season. Hammargren then joined the Kawasaki factory racing team for the 1974 season. He competed in his final World Championship race at the 1976 500cc Luxembourg Grand Prix at the age of 31.

== Career overview ==
Hammargren won seven individual heat races and one Grand Prix victory during his world championship racing career. Although he never won a World Championship, he won two 500cc Swedish Motocross Championships (1969, 1971). Hammargren was a member of seven Swedish Motocross des Nations teams (1967, 1969-1973, 1976) and three Trophée des Nations teams (1968, 1969, 1971). He helped Sweden win the 1968 Trophée des Nations event and the 1970 and 1971 Motocross des Nations events.

== Motocross Grand Prix Results ==
Points system from 1952 to 1968:

| Position | 1st | 2nd | 3rd | 4th | 5th | 6th |
|---|---|---|---|---|---|---|
| Points | 8 | 6 | 4 | 3 | 2 | 1 |

Points system from 1969 to 1980:

| Position | 1 | 2 | 3 | 4 | 5 | 6 | 7 | 8 | 9 | 10 |
|---|---|---|---|---|---|---|---|---|---|---|
| Points | 15 | 12 | 10 | 8 | 6 | 5 | 4 | 3 | 2 | 1 |

| Year | Class | Team | 1 | | 2 | | 3 | | 4 | | 5 | | 6 | | 7 | | 8 | | 9 | | 10 | | 11 | | 12 | | 13 | | Pos | Pts |
| Year | Class | Team | R1 | R2 | R1 | R2 | R1 | R2 | R1 | R2 | R1 | R2 | R1 | R2 | R1 | R2 | R1 | R2 | R1 | R2 | R1 | R2 | R1 | R2 | R1 | R2 | R1 | R2 | Pos | Pts |
|---|---|---|---|---|---|---|---|---|---|---|---|---|---|---|---|---|---|---|---|---|---|---|---|---|---|---|---|---|---|---|
| 1967 | 500cc | Husqvarna | AUT - | AUT - | ITA - | ITA - | SWE; 1 | SWE; 4 | CZE - | CZE - | USR - | USR - | FRA - | FRA - | GER - | GER - | UK - | UK - | BEL - | BEL - | LUX; 5 | LUX; 4 | CH - | CH - | | | | | 7th | 12 |
| 1968 | 500cc | Husqvarna | AUT; 9 | AUT; 8 | ITA - | ITA - | SWE; 4 | SWE; 3 | FIN - | FIN - | GDR; 8 | GDR; 7 | CZE - | CZE - | UK; 2 | UK; 5 | GER; 7 | GER; 5 | FRA; 31 | FRA - | NED; 8 | NED - | BEL; 16 | BEL; 21 | LUX - | LUX; 8 | CH - | CH; 6 | 10th | 13 |
| 1969 | 500cc | Husqvarna | AUT - | AUT - | SWE; 5 | SWE; 3 | NED; 8 | NED; 6 | ITA - | ITA - | CZE - | CZE - | USR - | USR - | GER - | GER; 7 | BEL; 16 | BEL; 8 | LUX; 15 | LUX - | FRA; 6 | FRA; 5 | CH; 5 | CH; 10 | GDR; 7 | GDR; 3 | | | 8th | 35 |
| 1970 | 500cc | Husqvarna | CH; 6 | CH; 6 | AUT; 4 | AUT; 9 | NED; 1 | NED; 9 | FRA; 3 | FRA - | FIN; 3 | FIN; 6 | SWE; 1 | SWE; 4 | CZE; 7 | CZE; 5 | USR - | USR - | GER; 9 | GER; 5 | GDR; 7 | GDR - | BEL; 10 | BEL - | LUX; 3 | LUX; 4 | | | 5th | 59 |
| 1971 | 500cc | Husqvarna | ITA - | ITA - | AUT; 8 | AUT; 6 | SWE; 4 | SWE; 1 | FIN; 5 | FIN; 8 | CZE; 9 | CZE; 8 | USR - | USR - | GDR; 4 | GDR; 4 | UK - | UK - | GER - | GER - | BEL; 10 | BEL; 8 | LUX; 4 | LUX; 5 | NED - | NED - | | | 6th | 45 |
| 1972 | 500cc | Yamaha | AUT; 9 | AUT - | CH; 9 | CH - | SWE; 6 | SWE; 4 | FRA; 7 | FRA - | USR; 7 | USR; 10 | CZE; 10 | CZE - | UK - | UK - | GER - | GER - | GDR; 10 | GDR; 9 | BEL; 8 | BEL; 9 | LUX; 15 | LUX - | | | | | 12th | 18 |
| 1973 | 500cc | Yamaha | FRA; 1 | FRA - | AUT - | AUT - | FIN; 1 | FIN; 3 | ITA - | ITA - | CZE; 5 | CZE - | USA; 8 | USA; 5 | GER; 4 | GER; 3 | BEL - | BEL - | LUX; 7 | LUX - | NED; 3 | NED - | | | | | | | 6th | 87 |
| 1974 | 500cc | Kawasaki | AUT - | AUT - | FRA - | FRA - | ITA - | ITA - | DEN - | DEN - | CZE - | CZE; 10 | GER - | GER - | UK - | UK - | USA - | USA - | NED - | NED - | BEL - | BEL - | LUX; 4 | LUX - | | | | | 17th | 9 |
| 1975 | 500cc | Kawasaki | CH - | CH; 8 | ITA; 1 | ITA; 4 | FIN; 8 | FIN - | USR - | USR - | FRA - | FRA - | USA - | USA - | CAN; 8 | CAN - | UK; 4 | UK - | GER - | GER - | NED; 8 | NED - | BEL - | BEL - | LUX - | LUX - | | | 11th | 41 |
| 1976 | 500cc | Kawasaki | CH - | CH - | FRA - | FRA; 8 | ITA - | ITA - | AUT; 4 | AUT - | SWE; 8 | SWE; 7 | FIN - | FIN; 10 | GER - | GER - | USA - | USA - | CAN - | CAN - | UK - | UK; 9 | BEL - | BEL - | LUX - | LUX; 3 | | | 13th | 31 |
