= Åke Jonsson =

Swedish motorcycle racer

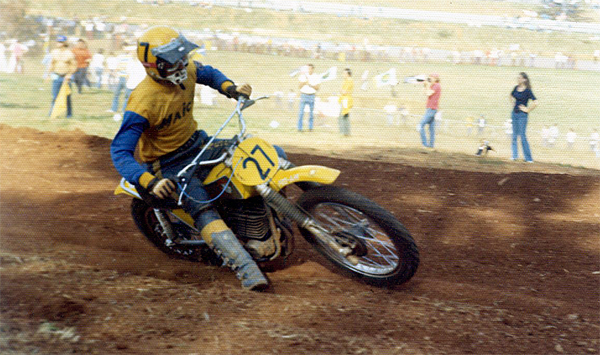
- Ake Jonsson in the 1972 Trans-AMA, St. Peters, Missouri
- Nationality: Swedish
- Born: 5 October 1942 (age 84) Hammerdal, Sweden

Motocross career
- Years active: 1964 - 1978
- Teams: Husqvarna, Maico, Yamaha
- Wins: 9
- GP debut: 1964 in Hedemora, Sweden (250cc)
- First GP win: 1966 in Schifflange, Luxembourg (250cc)

Åke Jonsson (born 5 October 1942) is a Swedish former professional motocross racer. He competed in the Motocross World Championships from 1964 to 1978 as a member of the Husqvarna, Maico and Yamaha factory racing teams.

Jonsson was part of a contingent of Swedish motorcyclists including; Bill Nilsson, Rolf Tibblin and Torsten Hallman who dominated the sport of motocross in the 1960s and early 1970s. He nearly won the 500cc World Championship title in 1968, 1970 and in 1971. He was a member of three victorious Swedish Motocross des Nations teams (1970, 1971, 1974) and was the top individual points scorer at the 1971 Motocross des Nations. In 1972, Jonsson won nine consecutive races to claim the 1972 Trans-AMA motocross series.

== Motocross racing career ==
=== Early career ===
Born in Hammerdal, Jonsson's family moved to Västerås when he was a child. He became a skilled speed skater and belonged to the Swedish top junior elite before his motorcycle racing career took precedence. His physical conditioning from ice skating helped him achieve early success when he transitioned to motorcycle racing.

At the age of 16, Jonsson acquired his first motorcycle when he purchased a DKW. He began competing in motocross races and progressed to the Swedish motocross national championship in 1963. Unable to afford a new motorcycle, Jonsson decided to build his own motorcycle from spare parts and, rode it to a ninth place in the 250cc Swedish national championship.

=== Husqvarna factory team ===
Jonsson's impressive results earned him a sponsorship to ride for the Husqvarna factory and with a new motorcycle, Jonsson was able to defeat Torsten Hallman for the 1964 250cc Swedish Motocross Championship. In 1964, Jonsson began competing in the 250cc Motocross World Championships and posted impressive results with a third place at his home Swedish Grand Prix and finishing second to defending world champion Joel Robert at the Finnish Grand Prix. In 1966, Jonsson won his first Grand Prix race with a victory at the 1966 250cc Luxembourg Grand Prix at Schifflange.

Jonsson completed his engineering degree in 1967, but delayed entering the engineering profession and continued to compete in motocross. In 1967 Jonsson joined his Husqvarna teammates, Torsten Hallman and Arne Kring, along with ČZ factory teammates Joël Robert, Roger De Coster and Dave Bickers in a series of exhibition races in the United States that had been organized by Edison Dye, the American importer for Husqvarna motorcycles. The exhibition races served as a means to introduce the sport of motocross to an American audience, and eventually led to the formation of the Inter-AM and Trans-AMA motocross series that helped to popularize the sport of motocross in the United States.

Jonsson moved up to the 500cc class in 1968 and won the national championship over Christer Hammargren and Bengt Åberg. Although Jonsson was posting impressive results, Husqvarna's meager racing budget meant that world champions Bengt Åberg and Torsten Hallman received most of their support, leaving Jonsson struggling to secure spare parts for his motorcycle.

In the 1968 500cc World Championship, Jonsson put himself into contention by winning the Swedish Grand Prix then taking the championship points lead by winning the West German Grand Prix. However, his motorcycle had a mechanical failure at Round 10 in Belgium allowing BSA factory rider John Banks to claim the championship points lead. The championship was not decided until the final round in Switzerland where the defending champion Paul Friedrichs (ČZ), Banks and Jonsson each had a mathematical chance of winning the world championship. Friedrichs had a decisive victory at the Swiss Grand Prix to secure his third consecutive 500cc World Championship. Jonsson finished the season ranked third behind Friedrichs and Banks.

=== Maico team ===
In 1969, Jonsson was hired to ride in the 500cc class for the Maico factory racing team alongside teammates Adolf Weil and Willy Bauer however, his motorcycle had reliability issues and he dropped to 13th in the season final points standings. In the 1970 season he began to post consistent results and won the East German Grand Prix and placed second in Belgium to take the championship points lead going into the final round in Luxembourg. Unfortunately, Jonsson failed to score any points while Bengt Åberg scored a decisive victory at the Luxembourg Grand Prix to clinch the 500cc World Championship. For the second time in three seasons, Jonsson finished the season ranked third in the World Championship. At the 1970 Motocross des Nations event, Jonsson won a race to help the Swedish team win the event for the first time since 1962. Later that year he traveled to America where he won the 1970 Inter-AM Motocross Series.

Jonsson's best year would be in 1971 where his main rivals for the 500cc World Championship would be his Maico teammate Adolph Weil and Suzuki factory team rider, Roger De Coster. After a slow start, Jonsson placed first or second in six consecutive Grand Prix events to take a slim championship points lead over De Coster going into the final round at the Dutch Grand Prix. Jonsson had taken the lead at the beginning of the final round when his motorcycle's spark plug came loose, allowing DeCoster to pass him for the victory and claim the World Championship by a four point margin. For the second consecutive year, Jonsson had the World Championship slip from his grasp in the final round of the championship. A few weeks later he took a slight revenge by winning both motos to lead the Swedish team to their second consecutive victory at the 1971 Motocross des Nations held in Vannes, France.

Jonsson was injured in the middle of the 1972 Grand Prix season but, almost finished the season as the series runner up. At the last race for the season in Ettelbruck, Luxembourg, Jonsson won the first moto and, was leading the second moto on the last lap when his motorcycle ran out of fuel, causing a DNF. Instead of being the runner up, he now took a fourth place in the 1972 world championship. Jonsson then dominated the season ending 1972 Trans-AMA motocross series held in America, winning nine consecutive races at one point.

=== Yamaha team ===
For the 1973 season, Jonsson was hired for three years, by the Yamaha factory racing team to ride their new motorcycle with its innovative rear suspension using a single shock absorber called a monoshock. When he first joined the Yamaha team, it was rumored that he installed Maico front suspension to his bike but, Jonsson stated in a later interview that the forks were manufactured in Japan. He had a series of mechanical difficulties and a lot of development in the motorcycle and failed to repeat his performance of the previous years. Jonsson was a member of another victorious Swedish team at the 1974 Motocross des Nations event. 1974 would mark the last year that Sweden was the Motocross des Nations Champion.

In the wake of the 1973 oil crisis, sales of recreational vehicles decreased significantly, and Yamaha was forced to reduce their competition budget by withdrawing their motocross and road racing teams after the 1975 season. Jonsson returned to ride for the Maico team 1976 but, he broke his collarbone and ended the season ranked eighth in the 500cc World Championship. Jonsson retired from competition at the age of 36 after the 1978 Swedish national championship season.

== Career overview ==
Jonsson won 22 individual heat races and nine Grand Prix victories during his world championship racing career. He was a 500cc Vice Champion (1971), a 250cc Swedish motocross national champion (1964) and a six-time 500cc Swedish motocross national champion (1967, 1968, 1972, 1973, 1975, 1976). He was a member of three victorious Swedish Trophée des Nations teams (1964, 1966, 1967), and three victorious Swedish Motocross des Nations teams (1970, 1971, 1974). Jonsson was the top individual points scorer at the 1971 Motocross des Nations event.

== Later life ==
After his racing career Jonsson operated a Yamaha dealership in Sweden. Today he lives a retired life in Sweden. He was also a co-author of "The Technique of Moto-Cross," with Vin Gilligan, a book on advanced riding techniques for racers. Former Dutch world championship motocross competitor, Gerrit Wolsink, in an interview with "Motocross Action" magazine, praised the book strongly, saying that even at his level, he learned helpful information about techniques to use in various situations.

== Motocross Grand Prix Results ==
Points system from 1952 to 1968:

Position	1st	2nd	3rd	4th	5th	6th
Points	8	6	4	3	2	1

Points system from 1969 to 1980:

Position	1	2	3	4	5	6	7	8	9	10
Points	15	12	10	8	6	5	4	3	2	1

Year	Class	Team	1		2		3		4		5		6		7		8		9		10		11		12		13		14		15		Pos	Pts
Year	Class	Team	R1	R2	R1	R2	R1	R2	R1	R2	R1	R2	R1	R2	R1	R2	R1	R2	R1	R2	R1	R2	R1	R2	R1	R2	R1	R2	R1	R2	R1	R2	Pos	Pts
1964	250cc	Husqvarna	ESP -	ESP -	BEL -	BEL -	CH -	CH -	CZE -	CZE -	GER -	GER -	LUX -	LUX -	ITA -	ITA -	UK -	UK -	SWE; 3	SWE; 4	FIN; 2	FIN; 3	USR; 2	USR -	POL -	POL -	GDR; 3	GDR; 5	FRA; 1	FRA; 2			6th	19
1965	250cc	Husqvarna	ESP; 7	ESP; 1	ITA -	ITA -	FRA; 6	FRA; 11	BEL; 6	BEL; 3	CZE; 4	CZE; 6	GER; 4	GER; 3	NED -	NED -	LUX; 10	LUX; 4	POL; 4	POL; 6	USR; 6	USR; 2	GDR; 4	GDR; 2	UK; 4	UK; 4	SWE; 5	SWE; 4	FIN; 14	FIN; 7	AUT -	AUT -	5th	30
1966	250cc	Husqvarna	ESP -	ESP -	FRA -	FRA -	BEL -	BEL -	CH; 4	CH; 5	CZE -	CZE -	GER; 4	GER; 4	NED -	NED -	LUX; 3	LUX; 1	ITA -	ITA -	POL; 3	POL; 3	GDR -	GDR -	SWE; 4	SWE; 1	FIN; 6	FIN; 2	USR -	USR -	AUT -	AUT -	6th	28
1967	500cc	Husqvarna	AUT -	AUT -	ITA -	ITA -	SWE; 7	SWE; 9	CZE -	CZE -	USR; 8	USR -	FRA -	FRA -	GER -	GER -	UK -	UK -	BEL; 8	BEL; 7	LUX -	LUX -	CH -	CH -									18th	2
1968	500cc	Husqvarna	AUT -	AUT; 6	ITA -	ITA -	SWE; 1	SWE; 6	FIN; 2	FIN; 4	GDR; 6	GDR; 3	CZE; 4	CZE; 3	UK -	UK; 1	GER; 3	GER; 2	FRA; 5	FRA; 6	NED -	NED; 7	BEL -	BEL -	LUX; 7	LUX; 4	CH; 4	CH; 4					3rd	34
1969	500cc	Maico	AUT -	AUT -	SWE; 8	SWE; 11	NED -	NED -	ITA; 5	ITA -	CZE; 10	CZE; 11	USR; 5	USR; 5	GER; 10	GER; 4	BEL -	BEL -	LUX; 8	LUX -	FRA -	FRA -	CH; 8	CH; 1	GDR -	GDR -							13th	25
1970	500cc	Maico	CH; 8	CH; 5	AUT; 2	AUT; 6	NED; 6	NED; 3	FRA -	FRA -	FIN; 2	FIN; 3	SWE -	SWE -	CZE; 5	CZE; 3	USR -	USR -	GER; 2	GER; 4	GDR; 2	GDR; 2	BEL; 3	BEL; 1	LUX -	LUX -							3rd	77
1971	500cc	Maico	ITA -	ITA; 3	AUT; 5	AUT; 28	SWE; 5	SWE; 4	FIN; 3	FIN; 1	CZE; 4	CZE; 4	USR; 2	USR; 1	GDR; 2	GDR; 1	UK; 1	UK; 2	GER; 3	GER; 1	BEL; 2	BEL; 2	LUX; 2	LUX; 1	NED; 10	NED; 1							2nd	93
1972	500cc	Maico	AUT; 6	AUT; 2	CH; 6	CH; 5	SWE -	SWE -	FRA -	FRA -	USR; 9	USR; 3	CZE; 13	CZE; 2	UK; 3	UK; 1	GER; 4	GER; 3	GDR -	GDR; 2	BEL; 2	BEL; 2	LUX; 1	LUX -									4th	66
1973	500cc	Yamaha	FRA -	FRA; 3	AUT -	AUT -	FIN; 7	FIN; 8	ITA -	ITA -	CZE; 7	CZE -	USA -	USA; 7	GER; 3	GER; 2	BEL -	BEL; 4	LUX; 1	LUX; 1	NED; 1	NED; 2											4th	109
1974	500cc	Yamaha	AUT; 5	AUT; 6	FRA; 7	FRA -	ITA; 2	ITA; 7	DEN; 6	DEN -	CZE; 5	CZE; 4	GER; 6	GER; 4	UK; 5	UK; 8	USA; 9	USA -	NED; 6	NED; 4	BEL; 3	BEL; 6	LUX; 6	LUX; 5									7th	85
1975	500cc	Yamaha	CH; 6	CH; 6	ITA; 5	ITA; 2	FIN; 3	FIN; 3	USR; 1	USR; 2	FRA -	FRA -	USA -	USA -	CAN -	CAN -	UK; 6	UK; 3	GER; 4	GER; 5	NED; 7	NED; 4	BEL -	BEL; 1	LUX; 3	LUX; 3							4th	132
1976	500cc	Maico	CH; 9	CH; 4	FRA -	FRA; 3	ITA; 6	ITA; 7	AUT -	AUT; 6	SWE; 4	SWE; 5	FIN; 6	FIN; 5	GER -	GER; 6	USA; 10	USA; 4	CAN; 4	CAN; 6	UK; 9	UK; 4	BEL -	BEL -	LUX -	LUX -							8th	87
1977	500cc	Maico	AUT -	AUT -	NED -	NED -	SWE -	SWE; 6	FIN -	FIN -	GER -	GER -	ITA -	ITA -	USA -	USA -	CAN -	CAN -	UK -	UK -	BEL -	BEL -	LUX -	LUX -	CH; 10	CH; 8							22nd	9
1978	500cc	Kramer-Rotax	CH -	CH -	AUT -	AUT -	FRA -	FRA -	DEN -	DEN -	FIN -	FIN; 10	SWE; 10	SWE; 9	USA -	USA -	ITA -	ITA -	UK -	UK -	BEL -	BEL -	LUX -	LUX -	NED -	NED -							28th	4

== Other results ==
- 1963 8th in the Swedish National Championship (250cc)
- 1964 Swedish National Champion (250cc) - Trophees des Nations Champion
- 1965 4th in the Swedish National Championship (250cc)
- 1966 4th in the Swedish National Championship (250cc) - Trophees des Nations Champion - 3rd Motocross des Nations
- 1967 Swedish National Champion (500cc) - Trophees des Nations Champion - 2nd Motocross des Nations
- 1968 Swedish National Champion (500cc)
- 1969 4th in the Swedish National Championship (500cc) - 2nd Motocross des Nations - 3rd in the Inter-AM series
- 1970 3rd in the Swedish National Championship (500cc) - Motocross des Nations Champion - Inter-AM Champion
- 1971 2nd in the Swedish National Championship (500cc) - Motocross des Nations Champion
- 1972 Swedish National Champion (500cc) - 2nd Motocross des Nations - Trans-AMA Champion
- 1973 Swedish National Champion (500cc) - 2nd Motocross des Nations
- 1974 2nd in the Swedish National Championship (500cc) - Motocross des Nations Champion
- 1975 Swedish National Champion (500cc)
- 1976 Swedish National Champion (500cc) - 4th Trophees des Nations
- 1977 3rd in the Swedish National Championship (500cc)
- 1978 6th in the Swedish National Championship (500cc)
