= 1970 FIM Motocross World Championship =

Motocross championship season

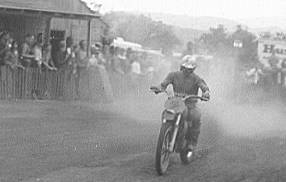
- 1970 500cc World Champion Bengt Åberg from Sweden.
- Organizer: FIM
- Duration: 12 April/9 August (500cc)
- Races: 12 (500cc)
- Manufacturers: 6 (500cc)

Champions
- 500cc: (Sweden) Bengt Åberg
- 250cc: (Belgium) Joël Robert

Motocross World Championship
- ← 1969 1971 →

The 1970 Motocross World Championship was the 14th edition of the Motocross World Championship organized by the FIM and reserved for 500cc and 250cc motorcycles.

== Summary ==
Husqvarna factory-supported rider Arne Kring led the 500cc world championship points standings after the first nine rounds; however, he broke his back while competing in a non-championship race, forcing him to withdraw from the remaining races. Maico factory team rider Åke Jonsson posted consistent podium results and took the championship points lead going into the final round, but he failed to score any points at the season-ending Luxembourg Grand Prix, which allowed Bengt Åberg to overtake him and claim his second consecutive 500cc world championship for the Husqvarna factory racing team.

The Suzuki team hired the two top finishers in last year's 250cc World Championship, Joël Robert and Sylvain Geboers. The two Suzuki teammates dominated the 1970 championship with each rider claiming four Grand Prix victories apiece. As with the previous year, the championship wasn't decided until the final round in Austria, where Robert prevailed over his teammate by a slim two-point margin. In just the third Grand Prix race of his career, 21-year-old Husqvarna rider Torleif Hansen scored a surprising victory at the 250cc French Grand Prix. Heikki Mikkola, another Husqvarna rider, surged in the second half of the season to claim three of the final four Grand Prix races, finishing just one point behind third-placed Roger De Coster riding for the ČZ factory racing team. Robert's victory marked the first motocross World Championship for a Japanese manufacturer.

== Grands Prix ==
=== 500cc ===
Round	Date	Grand Prix	Location	Race 1 Winner	Race 2 Winner	Overall Winner	Report
1	April 12	(Switzerland) Swiss Grand Prix	Payerne	(Sweden) Bengt Åberg	(East Germany) Paul Friedrichs	(Sweden) Bengt Åberg	Report
2	April 19	(Austria) Austrian Grand Prix	Sittendorf	(Sweden) Bengt Åberg	(East Germany) Paul Friedrichs	(Sweden) Bengt Åberg	Report
3	May 3	(Netherlands) Dutch Grand Prix	Lichtenvoorde	(Sweden) Arne Kring	(Sweden) Christer Hammargren	(Sweden) Arne Kring	Report
4	May 10	(France) French Grand Prix	Vesoul	(Sweden) Arne Kring	(Sweden) Arne Kring	(Sweden) Arne Kring	Report
5	May 24	(Finland) Finnish Grand Prix	Ruskeasanta	(Sweden) Arne Kring	(Sweden) Arne Kring	(Sweden) Arne Kring	Report
6	May 31	(Sweden) Swedish Grand Prix	Västerås	(Sweden) Christer Hammargren	(Sweden) Jan Johansson	(Sweden) Christer Hammargren	Report
7	June 14	(Czechoslovakia) Czechoslovak Grand Prix	Holice	(Sweden) Bengt Åberg	(Sweden) Arne Kring	(Sweden) Arne Kring	Report
8	June 21	(Soviet Union) Russian Grand Prix	Poltava	(East Germany) Paul Friedrichs	(East Germany) Paul Friedrichs	(East Germany) Paul Friedrichs	Report
9	July 12	(Germany) West German Grand Prix	Beuern	(Sweden) Bengt Åberg	(Germany) Adolf Weil	(Sweden) Bengt Åberg	Report
10	July 26	(East Germany) East German Grand Prix	Apolda	(Sweden) Bengt Åberg	(East Germany) Paul Friedrichs	(Sweden) Åke Jonsson	Report
11	August 2	(Belgium) Belgian Grand Prix	Namur	(Belgium) Roger De Coster	(Sweden) Åke Jonsson	(Belgium) Roger De Coster	Report
12	August 9	Luxembourg Grand Prix	Ettelbruck	(Germany) Adolf Weil	(East Germany) Paul Friedrichs	(Sweden) Bengt Åberg	Report

=== 250cc ===
Round	Date	Grand Prix	Location	Race 1 Winner	Race 2 Winner	Overall Winner	Report
1	April 12	(Spain) Spanish Grand Prix	Sabadell	(Belgium) Joël Robert	(Belgium) Joël Robert	(Belgium) Joël Robert	Report
2	April 19	(France) French Grand Prix	Pernes-les-Fontaines	(Czech Republic) Miroslav Halm	(Sweden) Torleif Hansen	(Sweden) Torleif Hansen	Report
3	April 26	(Belgium) Belgian Grand Prix	Paal	(Belgium) Joël Robert	(Belgium) Sylvain Geboers	(Belgium) Sylvain Geboers	Report
4	May 10	(Socialist Federal Republic of Yugoslavia) Yugoslavian Grand Prix	Orehova vas	(Belgium) Joël Robert	(Belgium) Joël Robert	(Belgium) Joël Robert	Report
5	May 24	(Italy) Italian Grand Prix	San Severino	(Belgium) Joël Robert	(Belgium) Sylvain Geboers	(Belgium) Joël Robert	Report
6	May 31	(Soviet Union) Russian Grand Prix	Lvov	(Belgium) Sylvain Geboers	(Belgium) Sylvain Geboers	(Belgium) Sylvain Geboers	Report
7	June 7	(Poland) Polish Grand Prix	Szczecin	(Belgium) Sylvain Geboers	(Belgium) Sylvain Geboers	(Belgium) Sylvain Geboers	Report
8	June 28	(United Kingdom) British Grand Prix	Bristol	(Belgium) Joël Robert	(Belgium) Joël Robert	(Belgium) Joël Robert	Report
9	August 9	(Finland) Finnish Grand Prix	Hyvinkää	(Finland) Heikki Mikkola	(Belgium) Joël Robert	(Finland) Heikki Mikkola	Report
10	August 23	(East Germany) East German Grand Prix	Gumpelstadt	(Belgium) Sylvain Geboers	(Belgium) Sylvain Geboers	(Belgium) Sylvain Geboers	Report
11	August 30	(Switzerland) Swiss Grand Prix	Wohlen	(Belgium) Joël Robert	(Finland) Heikki Mikkola	(Finland) Heikki Mikkola	Report
12	September 27	(Austria) Austrian Grand Prix	Launsdorf	(Finland) Heikki Mikkola	(Finland) Heikki Mikkola	(Finland) Heikki Mikkola	Report

== Final standings ==
Points are awarded to the top 10 classified finishers. For the 250cc and 500cc final championship standings, the 7 best of 12 results are retained.

Position	1	2	3	4	5	6	7	8	9	10
Points	15	12	10	8	6	5	4	3	2	1

=== 500cc ===
(Results in italics indicate overall winner)

Pos	Rider	Machine	CH (Switzerland)		AUT (Austria)		NED (Netherlands)		FRA (France)		FIN (Finland)		SWE (Sweden)		TCH (Czechoslovakia)		USSR (Soviet Union)		GER (West Germany)		GDR (East Germany)		BEL (Belgium)		LUX (Luxembourg)		Points
Pos	Rider	Machine	R1	R2	R1	R2	R1	R2	R1	R2	R1	R2	R1	R2	R1	R2	R1	R2	R1	R2	R1	R2	R1	R2	R1	R2	
1	(Sweden) Bengt Åberg	Husqvarna	1	2	1	2	2	29	4	15	5	2	-	-	1	2	-	-	1	2	1	-	8	4	2	2	88
2	(Sweden) Arne Kring	Husqvarna	3	-	3	3	3	1	1	1	1	1	-	2	2	1	-	-	5	3	-	-	-	-	-	-	80
3	(Sweden) Åke Jonsson	Maico	8	5	2	6	6	3	-	-	2	3	-	-	5	3	-	-	2	4	2	2	3	1	-	-	77
4	(East Germany) Paul Friedrichs	ČZ	9	1	6	1	-	28	-	-	-	-	3	3	3	-	1	1	6	6	8	1	-	-	-	1	60
5	(Sweden) Christer Hammargren	Husqvarna	6	6	4	9	1	9	3	23	3	6	1	4	7	5	-	-	9	5	7	-	10	-	3	4	59
6	(West Germany) Adolf Weil	Maico	-	-	8	10	5	30	2	3	-	-	-	-	6	4	-	-	3	1	3	3	2	3	1	-	55
7	(Belgium) Jeff Teuwissen	Husqvarna	4	3	10	8	4	2	5	2	-	5	2	5	4	22	-	-	4	7	-	-	6	-	-	-	50
8	(Czech Republic) Otakar Toman	ČZ	-	-	5	7	10	20	7	4	-	-	8	7	21	10	3	2	7	10	6	5	-	6	-	-	40
9	(Belgium) Jaak van Velthoven	Husqvarna	11	4	14	11	8	4	10	20	13	9	9	8	13	6	-	-	10	8	12	8	4	5	8	5	35
10	(Netherlands) Gerrit Wolsink	Husqvarna	7	7	-	-	9	5	-	-	4	7	-	-	-	-	-	-	-	9	5	7	13	-	6	3	28
11	(East Germany) Heinz Hoppe	ČZ	-	-	12	14	21	15	9	6	7	4	-	-	14	23	9	8	14	15	13	9	9	9	13	8	21
12	(United Kingdom) Vic Allan	Greeves	12	-	9	4	16	-	-	-	-	-	6	-	8	7	-	-	8	-	9	4	-	-	9	6	18
13	(Belgium) Roger De Coster	ČZ	-	-	-	-	-	-	-	-	-	-	-	-	-	-	-	-	-	-	-	-	1	2	-	-	15
14	(West Germany) Willy Bauer	Maico	-	-	13	13	-	-	13	9	-	-	-	-	15	16	-	-	13	12	4	6	7	10	5	-	13
15	(United Kingdom) Keith Hickman	BSA	10	9	7	5	-	-	8	8	-	-	-	6	16	-	-	-	12	-	-	-	-	-	4	-	12
16	(Czech Republic) Oldrich Hamrsmid	ČZ	-	-	-	-	24	21	6	10	8	14	-	-	-	-	-	-	16	11	-	-	-	-	11	7	11
17	(Soviet Union) Vladimir Ovchinikov	ČZ	-	-	-	-	-	-	-	-	-	-	-	-	-	-	2	6	-	-	-	-	-	-	-	-	10
17	(United Kingdom) Andy Roberton	AJS	2	8	-	-	-	-	-	-	-	-	-	-	20	-	-	-	-	-	-	-	-	-	-	-	10
17	(Sweden) Jan Johansson	Husqvarna	-	-	-	-	-	-	-	-	-	-	5	1	-	-	-	-	-	-	-	-	-	-	-	-	10
20	(Sweden) Jan Erik Sallqvist	Husqvarna	-	-	-	-	-	-	-	-	6	8	4	-	24	9	-	-	-	-	-	-	-	-	-	-	10
21	(Soviet Union) Arnis Angers	ČZ	-	-	-	-	-	-	-	-	-	-	-	-	19	17	4	4	-	-	26	11	-	-	-	-	8
22	(Soviet Union) Viatcheslav Krasnotchekov	ČZ	-	-	-	-	-	-	-	-	-	-	-	-	23	13	6	3	-	-	11	10	-	-	-	-	8
23	(Belgium) Willy van Loon	ČZ	-	-	-	15	15	10	12	22	-	-	-	9	22	19	-	-	-	-	-	-	12	8	7	12	7
24	(Netherlands) Frans Sigmans	Greeves	-	-	-	-	7	6	-	-	-	-	-	-	-	-	-	-	-	-	-	-	-	-	-	-	5
24	(Soviet Union) Mikhail Rastvortsev	ČZ	-	-	-	-	-	-	-	-	-	-	-	-	-	-	5	5	-	-	-	-	-	-	-	-	5
24	(Belgium) Gaston Rahier	ČZ	-	-	-	-	-	-	-	-	-	-	-	-	-	-	-	-	-	-	-	-	5	7	-	-	5
27	(Belgium) Walter Van Den Broeck	Maico	-	-	-	-	-	-	16	5	-	-	-	-	-	-	-	-	-	-	-	-	11	11	12	9	5
28	(Czech Republic) Vlastimil Válek	Jawa	-	-	-	-	-	-	-	-	-	-	-	-	9	8	-	-	-	-	-	-	-	-	-	-	4
28	(Soviet Union) Antonin Klavinsh	ČZ	-	-	-	-	-	-	-	-	-	-	-	-	18	-	7	7	-	-	-	-	-	-	-	-	4
30	(Czech Republic) Zdeněk Strnad	ČZ	-	-	11	12	19	12	-	-	9	11	-	-	11	12	-	-	11	-	10	-	-	-	-	-	4
31	(East Germany) Manfred Stein	ČZ	-	-	-	-	-	-	-	-	-	-	-	-	-	-	8	9	-	-	17	14	-	-	-	-	3
31	(Netherlands) Jo Keizer	ČZ	-	-	15	-	11	8	-	-	-	-	-	-	-	-	-	-	26	25	15	13	-	-	-	-	3
31	(Sweden) Hasse Hansson	Husqvarna	-	-	-	-	-	-	-	-	-	-	7	10	-	-	-	-	-	-	-	-	-	-	-	-	3
34	(Netherlands) Pierre Karsmakers	ČZ	-	10	-	-	12	7	15	-	-	-	-	-	12	14	-	-	-	-	-	-	-	-	-	-	2
34	(Sweden) Hans Henriksson	Husqvarna	-	-	-	-	-	-	-	-	10	-	10	-	-	-	-	-	-	-	-	-	-	-	-	-	2
34	(Czech Republic) Miroslav Halm	ČZ	-	-	-	-	-	-	-	-	-	-	-	-	10	11	-	-	-	-	-	-	-	-	-	-	2
37	(Switzerland) Josef Loetscher	Montesa	-	-	-	-	-	-	-	-	-	-	-	-	-	-	-	-	-	-	-	-	-	-	14	10	1
37	(France) Joël Queirel	Husqvarna	15	11	-	-	-	-	24	7	-	-	-	-	-	-	-	-	-	-	-	-	-	-	-	-	1
37	(Sweden) Lars Nord	Husqvarna	-	-	-	-	-	-	-	-	-	-	-	11	-	-	-	-	-	-	-	-	-	-	-	-	1
37	(East Germany) Helmut Schadenberg	ČZ	-	-	-	-	-	-	-	-	-	-	-	-	-	20	10	10	-	-	20	17	-	-	-	-	1
-	(United Kingdom) John Banks	BSA	5	-	-	-	-	-	-	-	-	-	-	-	-	-	-	-	-	-	-	-	-	-	-	-	0

=== 250cc ===
(Results in italics indicate overall winner)

Pos	Rider	Machine	ESP (Spain)		FRA (France)		BEL (Belgium)		YUG (Socialist Federal Republic of Yugoslavia)		ITA (Italy)		USSR (Soviet Union)		POL (Poland)		UK (United Kingdom)		FIN (Finland)		GDR (East Germany)		CH (Switzerland)		AUT (Austria)		Pts
Pos	Rider	Machine	R1	R2	R1	R2	R1	R2	R1	R2	R1	R2	R1	R2	R1	R2	R1	R2	R1	R2	R1	R2	R1	R2	R1	R2	
1	(Belgium) Joël Robert	Suzuki	1	1	4	-	1	2	1	1	1	2	-	-	-	-	1	1	2	1	2	3	1	5	2	3	96
2	(Belgium) Sylvain Geboers	Suzuki	2	3	12	2	2	1	5	2	3	1	1	1	1	1	2	-	-	4	1	1	-	2	3	-	94
3	(Belgium) Roger De Coster	ČZ	8	4	2	4	3	3	-	7	2	-	-	-	2	2	3	2	4	5	4	2	3	4	7	2	74
4	(Finland) Heikki Mikkola	Husqvarna	10	12	-	-	-	-	4	3	5	6	2	9	-	-	5	6	1	2	-	-	2	1	1	1	73
5	(Czech Republic) Miroslav Halm	ČZ	28	18	1	3	5	6	2	4	4	4	9	2	4	5	4	4	5	7	17	7	-	6	5	4	70
6	(Sweden) Uno Palm	Husqvarna	13	11	6	9	-	-	7	5	6	5	3	-	3	3	13	-	6	9	7	-	5	3	9	-	43
7	(Sweden) Olle Pettersson	Suzuki	5	8	7	6	10	4	9	6	12	8	4	8	-	-	6	-	12	6	8	4	6	7	6	5	42
8	(Sweden) Torleif Hansen	Husqvarna	-	-	3	1	4	14	11	-	-	3	5	-	5	-	7	3	3	3	9	-	4	-	-	-	35
9	(Czech Republic) Jiří Stodůlka	ČZ	7	7	13	-	8	9	12	8	8	10	17	4	6	6	-	15	-	-	5	10	8	8	10	-	31
10	(Soviet Union) Vladimir Kavinov	ČZ	-	-	-	-	-	-	-	-	-	-	7	3	-	7	-	-	11	10	3	5	-	-	-	-	26
11	(Sweden) Torsten Hallman	Husqvarna	6	2	5	-	-	-	10	-	-	9	-	-	-	-	9	5	-	-	-	-	7	-	-	-	17
12	(United Kingdom) Malcolm Davis	AJS	4	5	11	7	21	-	-	-	10	7	-	-	-	-	10	-	-	-	-	-	-	-	-	-	13
13	(Sweden) Håkan Andersson	Husqvarna	-	-	9	8	-	-	6	13	-	-	-	-	-	-	-	-	9	8	-	-	-	-	17	7	12
14	(United Kingdom) Bryan Wade	Greeves	3	6	-	-	-	-	8	-	11	-	6	15	8	-	-	11	-	-	-	-	-	-	-	-	10
15	(Soviet Union) Gennady Moiseyev	ČZ	-	-	-	-	-	-	3	9	-	-	-	6	9	4	-	-	8	-	6	16	-	-	-	-	10
16	(Belgium) Gaston Rahier	ČZ	11	9	10	5	11	12	-	-	-	-	-	-	-	-	-	-	-	-	-	-	-	-	-	-	7
17	(Czech Republic) Karel Konecny	ČZ	17	15	14	10	-	16	-	-	9	11	-	-	-	-	8	7	-	-	-	-	-	-	-	-	7
18	(Belgium) Marcel Wiertz	Bultaco	27	10	8	12	-	-	-	-	-	-	-	-	-	-	-	-	-	-	-	-	-	-	8	8	6
19	(Belgium) Jeff Teuwissen	Husqvarna	-	-	-	-	9	5	-	-	-	-	-	-	-	-	-	-	-	-	-	-	-	-	-	-	5
19	(Soviet Union) Viatcheslav Krasnotchekov	ČZ	-	-	-	-	-	-	-	-	-	-	11	7	-	-	-	-	-	-	-	-	-	-	-	-	5
21	(East Germany) Helmut Schumann	ČZ	-	-	-	-	-	-	-	-	-	-	-	-	-	9	-	-	-	-	-	-	-	-	12	9	5
22	(West Germany) Adolf Weil	Maico	-	-	-	-	7	7	-	-	-	-	-	-	-	-	-	-	-	-	-	-	-	-	-	-	4
22	(Soviet Union) Mikhail Rastvortsev	ČZ	-	-	-	-	-	-	-	-	-	-	15	5	-	-	-	-	-	-	-	-	-	-	-	-	4
22	(East Germany) Helmut Schadenberg	ČZ	-	-	-	-	-	-	-	-	-	-	-	-	-	-	-	-	-	-	14	6	-	-	-	-	4
25	(Denmark) Erling Rasmussen	Husqvarna	-	-	-	-	-	-	-	-	-	-	-	-	11	-	-	-	-	-	-	-	-	-	-	-	3
25	(Finland) Kalevi Vehkonen	Husqvarna	-	-	-	-	-	-	-	-	-	-	10	-	-	8	12	9	-	-	-	-	10	-	-	-	3
25	(East Germany) Heinz Hoppe	ČZ	-	-	-	-	-	-	-	-	-	-	-	-	-	-	-	-	-	-	12	8	-	-	-	-	3
25	(West Germany) Willy Bauer	Maico	-	-	-	-	-	-	-	-	-	-	-	-	-	-	-	-	-	-	-	-	9	9	-	-	3
29	(Poland) Eugeniusz Straczek	ČZ	-	-	-	-	-	-	-	-	-	-	-	-	12	10	-	-	-	-	-	-	-	-	-	-	2
29	(Denmark) Soren Lodal	ČZ	29	30	27	17	-	-	-	-	-	-	-	-	-	-	16	10	-	-	-	-	-	-	-	-	2
29	(France) Jean-Claude Nowack	Husqvarna	20	25	-	13	-	-	-	-	-	-	-	-	-	-	20	-	-	-	-	-	-	-	13	11	2
32	(Soviet Union) Pavel Rulev	ČZ	-	-	-	-	-	-	-	10	-	-	-	-	10	-	-	-	10	11	-	-	-	-	-	-	2
32	(Finland) Jyrki Storm	Husqvarna	-	-	-	-	-	-	-	-	-	-	-	-	-	-	-	12	-	-	-	-	-	10	15	10	2
34	(Soviet Union) Anatoly Mandritchenko	ČZ	-	-	-	-	-	-	-	-	-	-	-	-	13	-	-	-	-	-	-	-	-	-	-	-	1
34	(France) Michel Combes	AJS	21	22	17	26	-	-	-	-	-	-	-	-	-	-	-	-	-	-	21	17	-	-	-	-	1
34	(United Kingdom) Dick Clayton	Greeves	-	-	-	-	-	-	-	-	-	-	-	-	-	-	11	16	-	-	-	-	-	-	-	-	1
34	(Czech Republic) Vlastimil Hlous	ČZ	-	-	-	-	-	-	-	-	-	-	-	-	-	-	-	-	-	-	13	9	-	-	-	-	1
34	(Sweden) Bengt Arne Bonn	AJS	9	-	15	32	12	11	-	-	7	-	8	-	-	-	-	-	-	-	-	-	-	-	-	-	1
-	(East Germany) Paul Friedrichs	ČZ	-	-	-	-	-	-	-	-	-	-	-	-	-	-	-	-	-	-	-	-	-	-	4	-	0
-	(Belgium) Jaak van Velthoven	Husqvarna	-	-	-	-	6	-	-	-	-	-	-	-	-	-	-	-	-	-	-	-	-	-	-	-	0
-	(United Kingdom) Andy Roberton	AJS	-	-	16	11	-	8	-	-	-	-	-	-	-	-	-	-	-	-	-	-	-	-	-	-	0
