= Bryan "Badger" Goss =

British motorcycle racer

Bryan Badger Goss
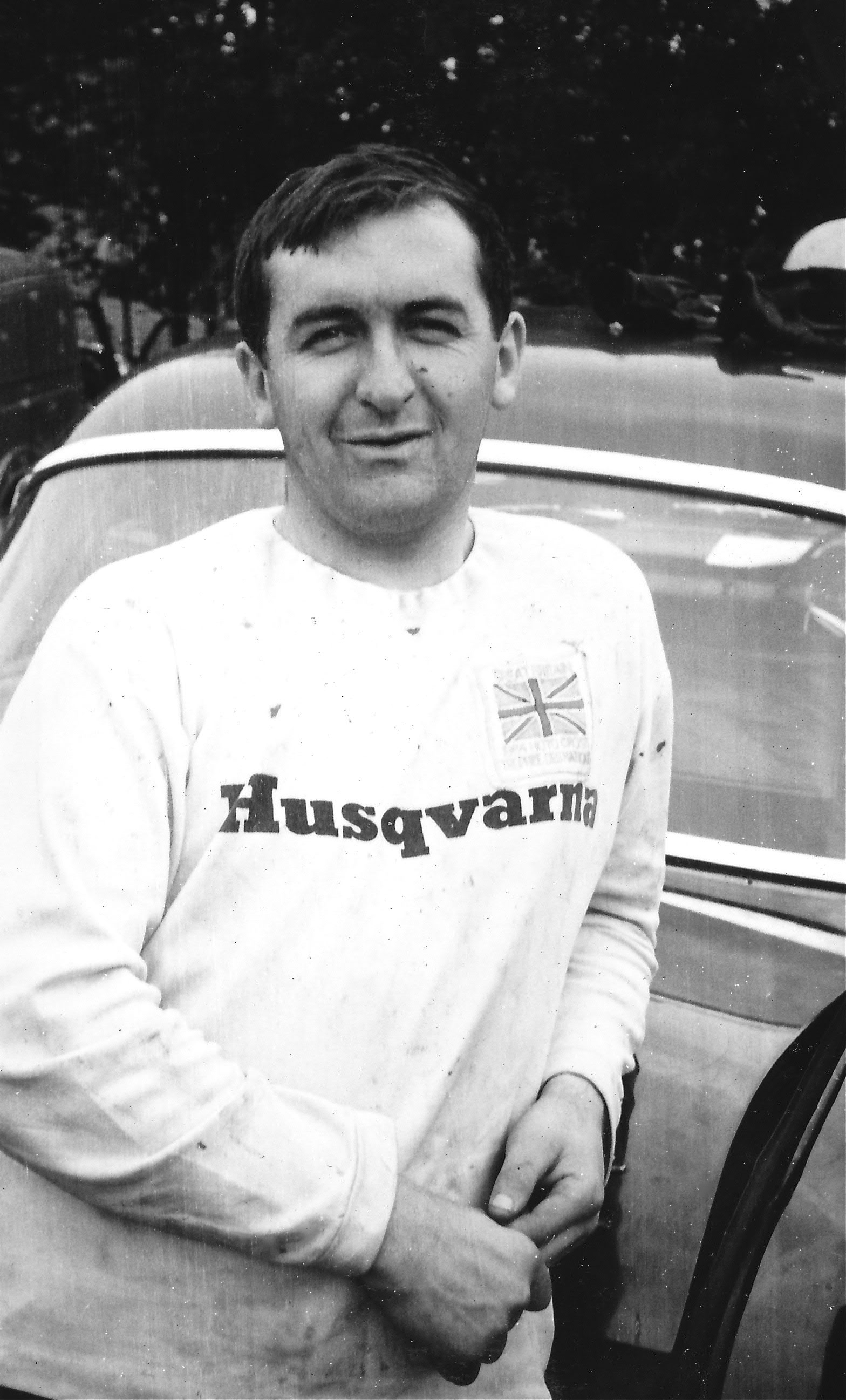
- Goss at an event in 1966
- Nationality: English
- Born: 11 September 1940 Sturminster Newton
- Died: 5 January 2021 (aged 80) Yeovil

Motocross career
- Years active: 1964 - 1965, 1967, 1969
- Teams: Cotton, Greeves, Husqvarna
- GP debut: 1964 250cc British Grand Prix

Bryan Winston Goss (11 September 1940 – 5 January 2021), was an English professional motocross racer (also known as a scrambler). He competed in the Motocross World Championships between 1964 and 1969.

Goss was the top individual points scorer at the 1966 Trophée des Nations (now Motocross des Nations) held at Brands Hatch. He won both individual legs of the event, beating top riders Joël Robert, Torsten Hallman and teammate Dave Bickers. The Trophy event, won on points by Sweden, comprised two legs, each lasting 40 minutes, and was contested by five-man teams from ten countries. Goss went on to win the British Championship in 1970 as well as various other major motocross victories.

== Riding career ==
Goss was born in Sturminster Newton, Dorset, England. After experimenting with rolling his bicycle down local farmers' fields, Goss started racing on grass tracks at age 16 in 1957, riding a 197 cc LCS (Lew Coffin Special) until breaking a leg during a meeting in Exeter in 1958. After a one-year absence from competition, Goss returned riding a 197 cc Greeves Hawkstone provided by the factory distributor for the West Country of England, Triss Sharp. Good results secured a factory Cotton for 1960.

Goss stayed with Cotton for three years, working as a lorry driver and in a cattle-feed business during the week, also working briefly at the Cotton factory in Gloucester until he won a race on a rival DOT machine. After losing his job, Goss again rode for Cotton until securing factory machines again with Greeves for 1963 and 1964.

Living in Yetminster, Dorset, in 1964, Goss started his own company selling motocross bikes and accessories at Yeovil, the nearest big town just across the county boundary in Somerset.

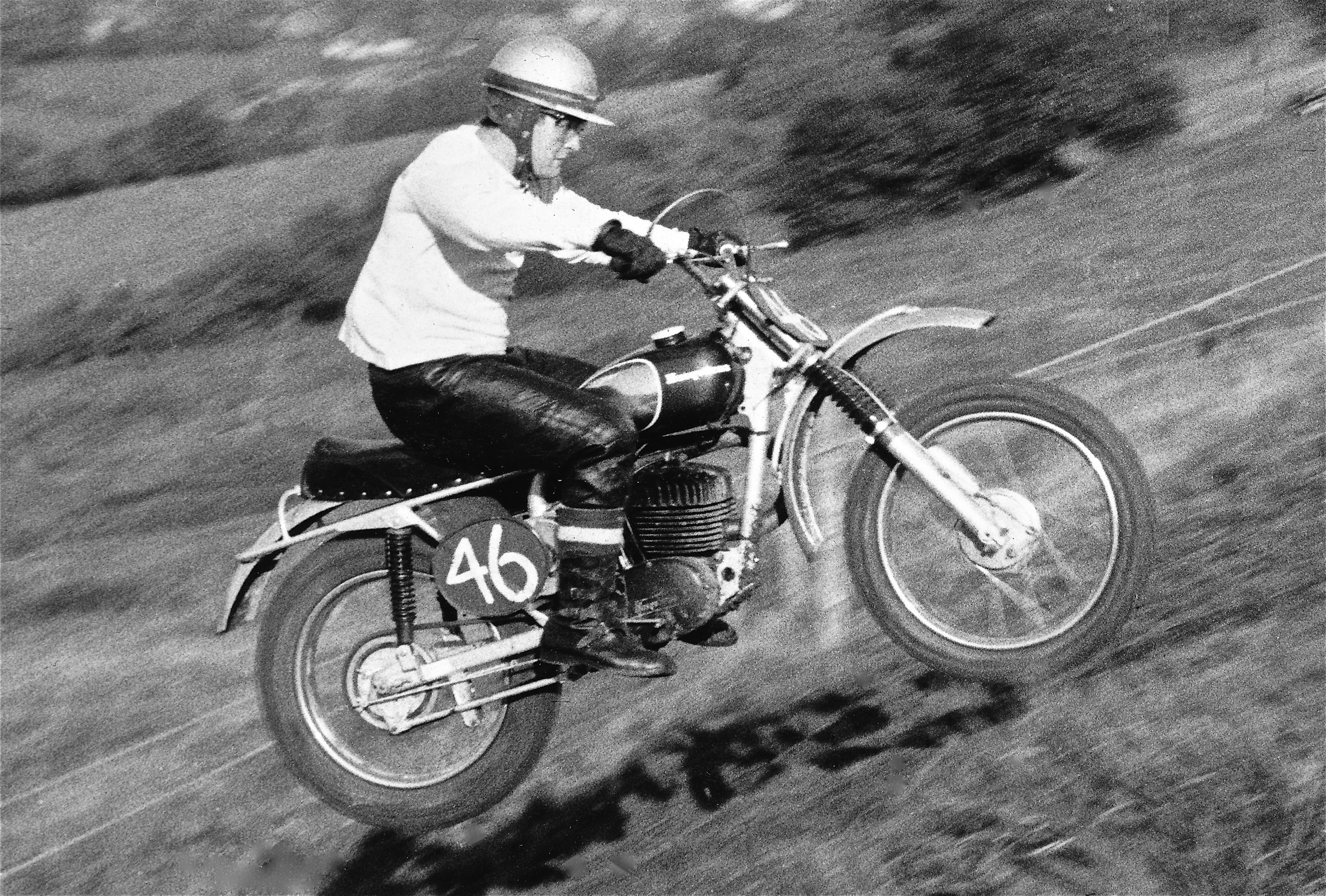
Goss on a Husqvarna at Bulbarrow Hill, England in 1965

When interviewed by Motor Cycle in 1966, Goss confirmed no-one knew the origins of the nickname 'Badger' he'd had since a youngster, but it was expected to be for life, and he had a stuffed Badger's head above the shop-counter.

During 1965, Goss rode for Cotton and a used a private Husqvarna, purchased from Jeff Smith, until 1966 when he signed for Greeves. With the regular major overhauls being carried out by his factory backers, Goss' brother Tony helped with transportation and preparation.

== After racing ==
Goss carried on racing but business commitments took over while importing Maico motorcycles. The business continues in Yeovil with Bryan's son at the helm, and with his young grandchildren beginning to compete in motocross competitions.
