= Jaak van Velthoven =

Belgian motorcycle racer

Jaak Van Velthoven
- Nationality: Belgian
- Born: 24 January 1951 (age 75) Lommel, Belgium

Motocross career
- Years active: 1969–1985
- Teams: Husqvarna, Yamaha, KTM
- Wins: 5

Jaak Van Velthoven (24 January 1951) is a Belgian former professional motocross racer. He competed in the FIM Motocross World Championships from 1969 to 1985. Standing well over 6 feet tall, it was not difficult to distinguish him in the pack and he was often referred to as 'Long tall Jaak'.

Van Velthoven was born in Lommel, Belgium on 24 January 1951. At the age of 18, he competed in his first Motocross World Championship event at the 1969 500cc Austrian Grand Prix as a privateer aboard a Husqvarna motorcycle. He won the first overall victory of his career with the Yamaha factory racing team at the 1972 500cc Luxembourg Grand Prix where he finished ahead of three-time World Champion Paul Friedrichs. He ended the season ranked fifth in the 500 class. Van Velthoven actually scored enough points to finish the season ranked second overall but fell victim to FIM scoring rules at the time which only recognized the top seven of twelve results. The rules would be changed in 1977.

Van Velthoven's best individual performance was a third place in the 500cc World Championship in 1973. He helped Yamaha develop a revolutionary motorcycle rear suspension that used a single shock absorber (invented by the Belgian engineer Lucien Tilkens) instead of the traditional dual shock absorbers.

In the wake of the 1973 oil crisis, sales of recreational vehicles decreased significantly, and Yamaha was forced to reduce their competition budget by withdrawing their motocross and road racing teams after the 1975 season. Van Velthoven then became the Belgian importer for KTM motorcycles and competed at the World Championship level for another ten years for the Austrian motorcycle company. In 1976, he sponsored André Malherbe to race in the 250cc World Championship. Malherbe went on to become a three-time 500cc Motocross World Champion for the Honda factory team. Van Velthoven competed in his final World Championship race at the 1985 500cc Swiss Grand Prix at the age of 34.

Van Velthoven won four individual heat races and five Grand Prix victories during his world championship racing career. Although he never won a Motocross World Championship, he was a three-time Belgian Motocross National Champion (1967, 1971, 1973). Van Velthoven was a member of four victorious Belgian teams at the Motocross des Nations (1972-1973, 1976-1977) and ten victorious Trophée des Nations teams (1969-1978).

== Motocross Grand Prix Results ==
Points system from 1969 to 1980:

Position	1	2	3	4	5	6	7	8	9	10
Points	15	12	10	8	6	5	4	3	2	1

Points system from 1984:

Position	1st	2nd	3rd	4th	5th	6th	7th	8th	9th	10th	11th	12th	13th	14th	15th
Points	20	17	15	13	11	10	9	8	7	6	5	4	3	2	1

Year	Class	Team	1		2		3		4		5		6		7		8		9		10		11		12		Pos	Pts
Year	Class	Team	R1	R2	R1	R2	R1	R2	R1	R2	R1	R2	R1	R2	R1	R2	R1	R2	R1	R2	R1	R2	R1	R2	R1	R2	Pos	Pts
1969	500cc	Husqvarna	AUT; 8	AUT; 12	SWE; 9	SWE -	NED -	NED -	ITA -	ITA -	CZE; 12	CZE -	USR -	USR -	GER -	GER -	BEL; 13	BEL; 17	LUX; 18	LUX -	FRA -	FRA -	CH; 10	CH; 7	GDR -	GDR -	23rd	6
1970	500cc	Husqvarna	CH; 11	CH; 4	AUT; 14	AUT; 11	NED; 8	NED; 4	FRA; 10	FRA; 20	FIN; 13	FIN; 9	SWE; 9	SWE; 8	CZE; 13	CZE; 6	USR -	USR -	GER; 10	GER; 8	GDR; 12	GDR; 8	BEL; 4	BEL; 5	LUX; 8	LUX; 5	9th	35
1971	500cc	Husqvarna	ITA; 7	ITA -	AUT; 4	AUT; 27	SWE; 16	SWE; 6	FIN; 22	FIN; 5	CZE; 6	CZE; 3	USR -	USR -	GDR; 9	GDR; 5	UK; 6	UK; 5	GER; 9	GER; 7	BEL -	BEL; 5	LUX -	LUX -	NED; 4	NED; 4	9th	32
1972	500cc	Yamaha	AUT -	AUT -	CH -	CH -	SWE; 5	SWE; 6	FRA; 10	FRA; 6	USR; 4	USR -	CZE; 5	CZE; 4	UK; 4	UK; 2	GER; 5	GER; 2	GDR; 6	GDR; 6	BEL; 4	BEL; 3	LUX; 2	LUX; 2			5th	57
1973	500cc	Yamaha	FRA; 2	FRA -	AUT -	AUT -	FIN; 2	FIN; 2	ITA -	ITA -	CZE; 3	CZE; 3	USA; 4	USA; 3	GER; 10	GER; 6	BEL; 5	BEL; 2	LUX; 2	LUX; 3	NED; 2	NED; 3					3rd	122
1974	500cc	Yamaha	AUT; 10	AUT -	FRA; 5	FRA; 5	ITA; 5	ITA; 5	DEN; 3	DEN -	CZE; 10	CZE -	GER -	GER -	UK; 1	UK; 2	USA; 3	USA; 5	NED; 4	NED -	BEL -	BEL; 4	LUX; 2	LUX; 3			5th	109
1975	500cc	Yamaha	CH -	CH; 10	ITA; 4	ITA; 3	FIN; 5	FIN; 4	USR -	USR; 6	FRA; 4	FRA; 3	USA -	USA -	CAN -	CAN -	UK; 3	UK -	GER; 5	GER -	NED -	NED -	BEL; 3	BEL; 3	LUX; 2	LUX -	5th	104
1976	500cc	KTM	CH -	CH -	FRA -	FRA; 6	ITA; 10	ITA -	AUT -	AUT -	SWE; 7	SWE -	FIN -	FIN -	GER; 3	GER -	USA; 6	USA; 9	CAN; 5	CAN; 4	UK -	UK; 5	BEL; 6	BEL; 3	LUX; 1	LUX; 1	7th	92
1977	500cc	KTM	AUT; 5	AUT; 4	NED; 8	NED -	SWE; 7	SWE; 9	FIN -	FIN -	GER; 7	GER; 6	ITA; 10	ITA; 7	USA -	USA; 9	CAN; 8	CAN; 7	UK; 6	UK; 8	BEL -	BEL -	LUX -	LUX -	CH; 1	CH; 2	7th	81
1978	500cc	KTM	CH; 3	CH; 6	AUT; 5	AUT -	FRA; 10	FRA; 7	DEN; 7	DEN; 6	FIN; 6	FIN -	SWE; 5	SWE -	USA; 8	USA -	ITA -	ITA -	UK -	UK; 5	BEL -	BEL; 4	LUX -	LUX; 6	NED; 6	NED; 6	8th	78
1979	250cc	KTM	ESP; 10	ESP; 10	NED -	NED; 6	ITA; 4	ITA; 9	BEL; 6	BEL; 4	YUG -	YUG -	CZE -	CZE; 8	POL -	POL; 7	FRA; 5	FRA -	FIN -	FIN -	USA -	USA -	GER -	GER; 10	BUL; 6	BUL; 2	9th	61
1980	500cc	KTM	CH -	CH; 6	AUT -	AUT -	FRA -	FRA -	SWE -	SWE -	FIN; 8	FIN; 8	ITA -	ITA; 7	NED; 8	NED; 5	USA -	USA; 9	CAN; 6	CAN; 8	GER; 10	GER -	BEL; 9	BEL; 5	LUX -	LUX -	10th	43
1981	500cc	KTM	AUT -	AUT; 3	CH; 6	CH; 6	FIN -	FIN; 5	SWE; 8	SWE; 6	ITA; 6	ITA; 6	FRA; 5	FRA; 9	USA -	USA -	UK; 4	UK -	NED -	NED -	CZE; 7	CZE; 7	BEL -	BEL; 6	LUX; 7	LUX; 5	8th	83
1982	500cc	KTM	FRA -	FRA; 5	NED; 4	NED; 4	SWE -	SWE; 8	FIN -	FIN -	AUT; 6	AUT; 10	ITA -	ITA -	GER -	GER; 9	USA -	USA; 9	CAN -	CAN -	UK; 5	UK; 8	BEL -	BEL -	LUX -	LUX -	11th	44
1983	500cc	KTM	CH; 7	CH; 8	AUT; 9	AUT -	GER -	GER; 8	SWE -	SWE -	FIN -	FIN -	ITA -	ITA -	USA -	USA -	FRA; 7	FRA; 3	UK; 8	UK; 6	BEL -	BEL; 9	SM -	SM -	NED; 7	NED; 3	10th	50
1984	500cc	KTM	AUT; 6	AUT -	CH -	CH -	ESP -	ESP -	FRA -	FRA -	SWE -	SWE -	GER -	GER -	NED; 9	NED -	USA -	USA -	CAN -	CAN -	UK; 14	UK; 5	BEL; 10	BEL; 6	ITA; 13	ITA; 13	14th	47
1985	500cc	KTM	AUT; 10	AUT -	FRA -	FRA; 7	SWE; 14	SWE; 8	FIN -	FIN; 9	ITA -	ITA; 15	ESP -	ESP -	NED; 14	NED -	USA -	USA -	UK -	UK -	BEL -	BEL; 9	LUX; 12	LUX; 11	CH; 11	CH; 8	15th	64
