= 1972 FIM Motocross World Championship =

Motocross championship season

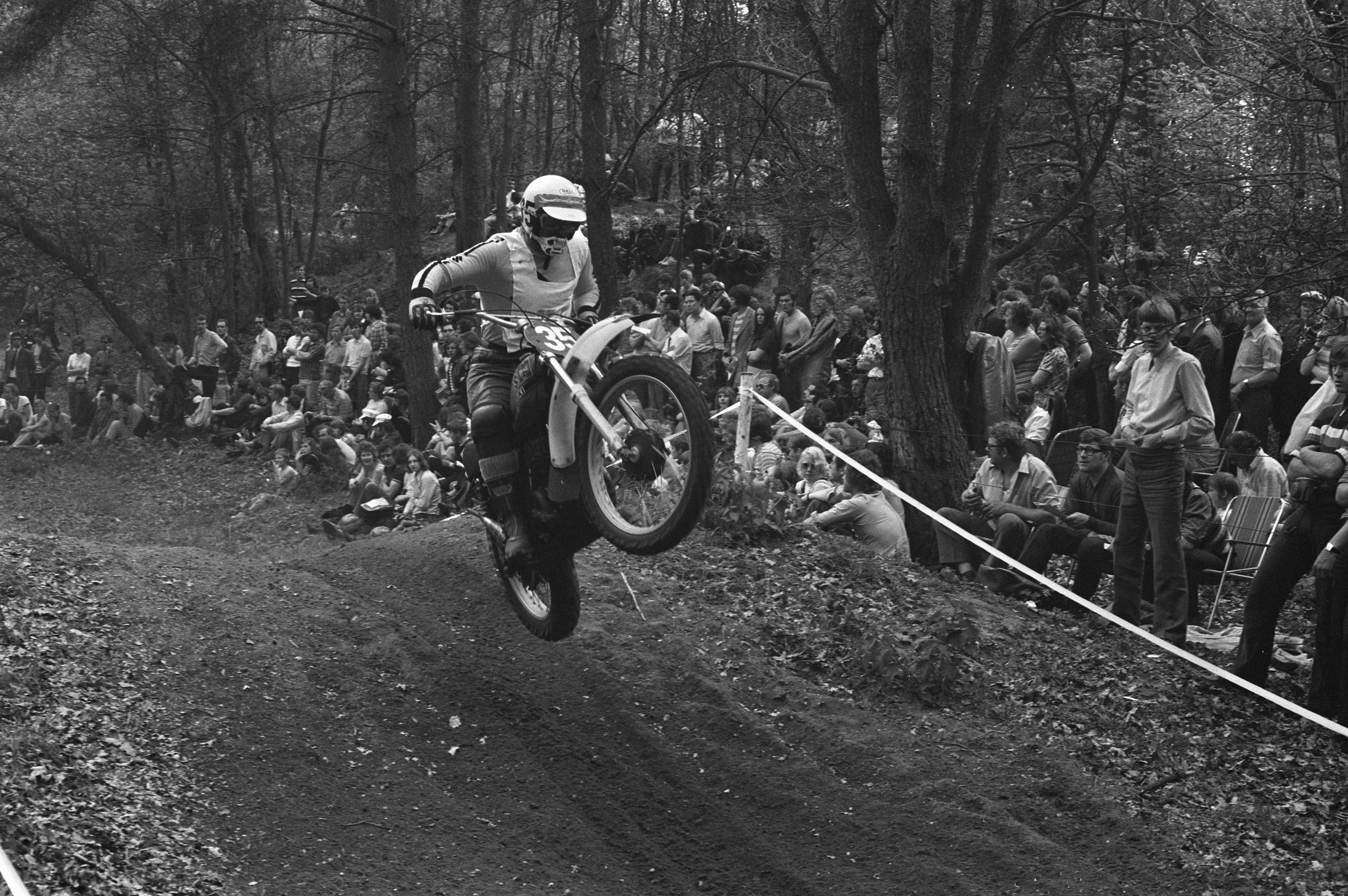
- Joël Robert in action in 1972
- Organizer: FIM
- Duration: 9 April/27 August
- Races: 24
- Manufacturers: 12

Champions
- 500cc: (Belgium) Roger De Coster
- 250cc: (Belgium) Joël Robert

FIM Motocross World Championship
- ← 1971 1973 →

The 1972 Motocross World Championship was the 16th edition of the Motocross World Championship organized by the FIM and reserved for 500cc and 250cc motorcycles.

== Summary ==
With no weight limit rules imposed by the FIM, Suzuki were able to develop extremely lightweight motorcycles for the 1972 season. Suzuki factory rider Roger De Coster led the 500cc World Championship from start to finish, winning six of twelve Grand Prix races to clinch the title with two races remaining on the schedule. The victory was the second consecutive 500cc World Championship for De Coster and Suzuki.

Second place in the championship would not be decided until the final race of the season in Ettelbruck, Luxembourg where Åke Jonsson (Maico) appeared poised to repeat his second-place result from the previous year. Jonsson won the first moto and, was leading the second moto on the last lap when his motorcycle ran out of fuel, dropping him to fourth in the final championship points standings. In his final season of competition, former three-time World Champion, Paul Friedrichs (ČZ), won the French and East German Grand Prix races and finished the season in second place to mark the end of his impressive career. Heikki Mikkola (Husqvarna) moved up from the 250cc class and made a positive impression with Grand Prix victories in Switzerland and Czechoslovakia to claim third in the 500 class. Friedrichs, Mikkola and Jonsson finished the season separated by just three points in the final standings.

The Yamaha factory team added former Husqvarna riders Christer Hammargren and Jaak van Velthoven in the 500cc class and Håkan Andersson in the 250cc class. Van Velthoven won the 500cc Luxembourg Grand Prix to give the Yamaha factory its first World Championship victory. Van Velthoven actually scored enough points to finish the season ranked second overall but fell victim to FIM scoring rules which only recognize the top seven of twelve results. The rules would be changed in 1977.

Suzuki factory rider Joël Robert once again dominated the 250cc World Championship, winning six of the twelve Grand Prix events to clinch the title with four races to go. The victory would be Robert's fifth consecutive 250cc World Championship, and sixth overall. Yamaha factory rider Håkan Andersson would take second place in the championship ahead of Suzuki's Sylvain Geboers. During the 1972 season, the Soviet Army motocross team signed an agreement with the Austrian KTM motorcycle company for a supply of motocross bikes. Russian rider Pavel Rulev received the first KTM at mid-season and gave the KTM factory its first race victory by winning the first moto of the 250cc Russian Grand Prix. Olle Pettersson scored the Kawasaki factory's first motocross world championship points with a 6th place at the 1972 250cc French Grand Prix.

== Grands Prix ==
=== 500cc ===
Round	Date	Grand Prix	Location	Race 1 Winner	Race 2 Winner	Overall Winner	Report
1	April 23	(Austria) Austrian Grand Prix	Sittendorf	(Belgium) Roger De Coster	(Belgium) Roger De Coster	(Belgium) Roger De Coster	Report
2	April 30	(Switzerland) Swiss Grand Prix	Payerne	(Finland) Heikki Mikkola	(Finland) Heikki Mikkola	(Finland) Heikki Mikkola	Report
3	May 7	(Italy) Italian Grand Prix	Pinerolo	Cancelled	-	-	Report
4	May 14	(Sweden) Swedish Grand Prix	Västerås	(Belgium) Roger De Coster	(West Germany) Adolf Weil	(Belgium) Roger De Coster	Report
5	May 24	(France) French Grand Prix	Corseul	(East Germany) Paul Friedrichs	(East Germany) Paul Friedrichs	(East Germany) Paul Friedrichs	Report
6	June 4	(Soviet Union) Russian Grand Prix	Poltava	(Belgium) Roger De Coster	(East Germany) Paul Friedrichs	(Belgium) Roger De Coster	Report
7	June 11	(Czechoslovakia) Czechoslovak Grand Prix	Přerov	(Belgium) Roger De Coster	(Sweden) Bengt Åberg	(Finland) Heikki Mikkola	Report
8	July 9	(United Kingdom) British Grand Prix	Farleigh Castle	(Belgium) Roger De Coster	(Sweden) Åke Jonsson	(Belgium) Roger De Coster	Report
9	July 16	(Germany) West German Grand Prix	Beuren	(Belgium) Roger De Coster	(Belgium) Roger De Coster	(Belgium) Roger De Coster	Report
10	July 23	(East Germany) East German Grand Prix	Apolda	(Belgium) Roger De Coster	(East Germany) Paul Friedrichs	(East Germany) Paul Friedrichs	Report
11	August 6	(Belgium) Belgian Grand Prix	Namur	(Belgium) Roger De Coster	(Belgium) Roger De Coster	(Belgium) Roger De Coster	Report
12	August 13	Luxembourg Grand Prix	Ettelbruck	(Sweden) Åke Jonsson	(West Germany) Adolf Weil	(Belgium) Jaak van Velthoven	Report

=== 250cc ===
Round	Date	Grand Prix	Location	Race 1 Winner	Race 2 Winner	Overall Winner	Report
1	April 9	(Spain) Spanish Grand Prix	Sabadell	(Belgium) Joël Robert	(Belgium) Sylvain Geboers	(Belgium) Sylvain Geboers	Report
2	April 16	(France) French Grand Prix	Pernes-les-Fontaines	(Belgium) Joël Robert	(Belgium) Joël Robert	(Belgium) Joël Robert	Report
3	May 7	(Netherlands) Dutch Grand Prix	Markelo	(Belgium) Joël Robert	(Soviet Union) Gennady Moiseyev	(Belgium) Joël Robert	Report
4	May 14	(Czechoslovakia) Czechoslovak Grand Prix	Holice	(Belgium) Joël Robert	(Soviet Union) Vladimir Kavinov	(Soviet Union) Vladimir Kavinov	Report
5	May 28	(Socialist Federal Republic of Yugoslavia) Yugoslavian Grand Prix	Tržič	(Belgium) Joël Robert	(Belgium) Joël Robert	(Belgium) Joël Robert	Report
6	June 4	(Germany) West German Grand Prix	Bielstein	(Belgium) Joël Robert	(Belgium) Joël Robert	(Belgium) Joël Robert	Report
7	June 11	(Poland) Polish Grand Prix	Szczecin	(Belgium) Joël Robert	(Belgium) Joël Robert	(Belgium) Joël Robert	Report
8	June 18	(Soviet Union) Russian Grand Prix	Chișinău	(Soviet Union) Pavel Rulev	(Belgium) Joël Robert	(Belgium) Joël Robert	Report
9	August 6	(Finland) Finnish Grand Prix	Hyvinkää	(Belgium) Sylvain Geboers	(Belgium) Sylvain Geboers	(Belgium) Sylvain Geboers	Report
10	August 13	(Sweden) Swedish Grand Prix	Huskvarna	(Sweden) Arne Kring	(Sweden) Håkan Andersson	(Sweden) Håkan Andersson	Report
11	August 20	(United Kingdom) British Grand Prix	Dodington Park	(Czechoslovakia) Jaroslav Falta	(Sweden) Håkan Andersson	(Czechoslovakia) Jaroslav Falta	Report
12	August 27	(Switzerland) Swiss Grand Prix	Wohlen	(Belgium) Joël Robert	(Soviet Union) Gennady Moiseyev	(Sweden) Håkan Andersson	Report

== Final standings ==
Points are awarded to the top 10 classified finishers. For the 500cc final championship standings, since the Italian Grand Prix was canceled the net result is achieved by taking half of the 11 results + 1 or the 6 best results. For the 250cc final championship standings, the 7 best of 12 results are retained.

Position	1	2	3	4	5	6	7	8	9	10
Points	15	12	10	8	6	5	4	3	2	1

=== 500cc ===
(Results in italics indicate overall winner)

Pos	Rider	Machine	AUT (Austria)		CH (Switzerland)		ITA (Italy)		SWE (Sweden)		FRA (France)		USSR (Soviet Union)		TCH (Czechoslovakia)		UK (United Kingdom)		GER (West Germany)		GDR (East Germany)		BEL (Belgium)		LUX (Luxembourg)		Points
Pos	Rider	Machine	R1	R2	R1	R2	R1	R2	R1	R2	R1	R2	R1	R2	R1	R2	R1	R2	R1	R2	R1	R2	R1	R2	R1	R2	
1	(Belgium) Roger De Coster	Suzuki	1	1	2	2	-	-	1	3	5	-	1	2	1	-	1	3	1	1	1	3	1	1	-	-	90
2	(East Germany) Paul Friedrichs	ČZ	-	-	5	-	-	-	-	-	1	1	8	1	-	-	7	-	2	5	2	1	6	-	6	3	62
3	(Finland) Heikki Mikkola	Husqvarna	10	6	1	1	-	-	-	-	6	5	3	5	2	3	5	-	-	-	5	5	13	5	-	-	61
4	(Sweden) Åke Jonsson	Maico	6	2	6	5	-	-	-	-	-	-	9	3	13	2	3	1	4	3	-	2	2	2	1	-	60
5	(Belgium) Jaak van Velthoven	Yamaha	-	-	-	-	-	-	5	6	10	6	4	-	5	4	4	2	5	2	6	6	4	3	2	2	57
6	(Czech Republic) Jiří Stodůlka	ČZ	4	4	-	-	-	-	14	5	-	-	5	7	3	5	-	9	8	6	9	7	10	15	5	4	45
7	(Sweden) Bengt Åberg	Husqvarna	7	8	3	3	-	-	2	-	3	4	2	6	-	1	6	-	-	-	4	4	5	-	-	-	44
8	(West Germany) Adolf Weil	Maico	-	-	4	-	-	-	3	1	2	2	-	-	4	-	2	4	-	-	-	-	3	4	-	1	42
9	(West Germany) Willy Bauer	Maico	2	3	-	-	-	-	4	2	-	3	-	-	-	-	9	8	7	4	3	-	-	-	-	-	33
10	(Netherlands) Gerrit Wolsink	Husqvarna	5	10	7	4	-	-	8	-	4	8	-	-	-	-	8	5	3	-	12	-	7	6	4	12	32
11	(United Kingdom) Andy Roberton	Husqvarna	8	5	-	-	-	-	-	10	-	10	-	-	8	8	12	7	-	-	11	8	11	8	-	-	19
12	(Sweden) Christer Hammargren	Yamaha	9	-	9	-	-	-	6	4	7	-	7	10	10	-	-	-	-	-	10	9	8	9	15	-	18
13	(United Kingdom) John Banks	ČZ	-	-	8	6	-	-	7	9	8	-	-	-	9	6	17	-	6	-	-	-	-	-	3	-	16
14	(Czech Republic) Vlastimil Válek	Jawa	3	7	14	10	-	-	-	-	11	7	-	-	7	-	14	12	11	9	8	-	12	13	-	-	16
15	(Soviet Union) Nikolai Efimov	ČZ	-	9	10	9	-	-	9	-	9	9	10	4	-	-	-	-	-	-	7	10	-	-	-	-	14
16	(Finland) Jyrki Storm	Husqvarna	-	-	-	-	-	-	-	-	-	-	-	-	-	-	15	16	14	10	14	12	15	16	7	5	11
17	(United Kingdom) Bryan Wade	Husqvarna	-	-	-	-	-	-	11	7	-	-	-	-	-	-	11	6	-	-	-	-	-	-	-	-	8
18	(Netherlands) Pierre Karsmakers	Husqvarna	-	-	-	8	-	-	-	-	-	-	-	-	6	-	-	-	10	-	-	-	9	7	-	-	7
19	(Czech Republic) Zdeněk Strnad	ČZ	-	-	-	-	-	-	-	-	-	-	-	-	-	9	-	-	12	8	-	-	-	-	-	-	7
20	(Austria) Friedrich Schiechtl	Husqvarna	-	-	-	-	-	-	-	-	-	-	-	-	-	-	-	-	-	-	-	-	-	19	8	7	6
21	(Soviet Union) Viatcheslav Krasnotchekov	ČZ	-	-	11	7	-	-	-	-	-	-	-	-	-	-	-	-	-	-	-	-	-	-	-	-	4
21	(Soviet Union) Vladimir Ovchinnikov	ČZ	-	-	-	-	-	-	-	-	-	-	6	8	-	-	-	-	-	-	-	-	-	-	-	-	4
21	(Sweden) Bert-Ove Wallner	Husqvarna	-	-	-	-	-	-	-	-	-	-	-	-	-	7	-	-	-	-	-	-	-	-	10	-	4
21	(Italy) Afro Rustignoli	ČZ	-	-	-	-	-	-	-	-	-	-	-	-	-	-	-	-	-	-	-	-	-	-	13	6	4
25	(France) Serge Bacou	Bultaco	-	-	-	-	-	-	-	-	-	-	-	-	-	-	18	13	-	11	-	-	-	-	9	10	3
26	(Sweden) Jan Johansson	Husqvarna	-	-	-	-	-	-	13	8	-	-	-	-	-	-	-	-	-	-	-	-	-	-	-	-	2
26	(Switzerland) Anton Stifter	Husqvarna	-	-	-	-	-	-	-	-	-	-	-	-	-	-	-	-	-	-	-	-	-	-	11	9	2
26	(United Kingdom) Vic Eastwood	AJS	-	-	-	-	-	-	-	-	-	-	-	-	-	-	10	15	-	-	-	-	-	-	-	-	1
29	(Sweden) Anders Hermansson	Husqvarna	-	-	-	-	-	-	10	12	-	-	-	-	-	-	-	-	-	-	-	-	-	-	-	-	1
29	(East Germany) Heinz Hoppe	ČZ	-	-	-	-	-	-	-	-	-	-	-	-	-	-	-	-	-	-	28	13	-	-	-	-	1
29	(United States) Bryan Kenney	Yamaha	-	-	-	-	-	-	-	-	-	-	-	-	-	-	-	-	-	-	16	11	-	-	-	-	1
29	(United States) Bill Clements	Husqvarna	-	-	-	-	-	-	-	-	-	-	-	-	-	-	-	-	-	-	-	-	19	20	16	11	1
29	(Soviet Union) Anatoly Botchkov	ČZ	-	-	12	13	-	-	-	-	-	-	-	-	-	-	-	-	-	-	-	-	-	-	-	-	1

=== 250cc ===
(Results in italics indicate overall winner)

Pos	Rider	Machine	ESP (Spain)		FRA (France)		NED (Netherlands)		TCH (Czechoslovakia)		YUG (Socialist Federal Republic of Yugoslavia)		GER (West Germany)		POL (Poland)		USSR (Soviet Union)		FIN (Finland)		SWE (Sweden)		UK (United Kingdom)		CH (Switzerland)		Pts
Pos	Rider	Machine	R1	R2	R1	R2	R1	R2	R1	R2	R1	R2	R1	R2	R1	R2	R1	R2	R1	R2	R1	R2	R1	R2	R1	R2	
1	(Belgium) Joël Robert	Suzuki	1	-	1	1	1	2	1	5	1	1	1	1	1	1	2	1	-	-	-	-	-	-	1	30	102
2	(Sweden) Håkan Andersson	Yamaha	-	-	-	-	-	-	3	8	7	-	4	6	3	5	6	4	4	3	2	1	5	1	3	2	82
3	(Belgium) Sylvain Geboers	Suzuki	2	1	-	-	2	3	-	-	2	3	8	3	2	-	3	-	1	1	-	-	3	-	-	-	62
4	(Finland) Kalevi Vehkonen	Montesa	6	-	8	10	8	4	10	9	4	2	10	-	-	-	4	-	3	2	5	5	6	3	5	5	57
5	(Sweden) Uno Palm	Husqvarna	12	2	7	7	6	6	4	3	5	8	-	-	4	6	5	3	-	-	-	-	-	-	-	-	53
6	(Czech Republic) Miroslav Halm	ČZ	-	-	9	3	10	10	5	6	-	-	14	2	5	3	8	-	5	7	3	9	2	4	-	-	45
7	(Soviet Union) Alexei Kibirine	ČZ	5	3	3	8	11	11	6	4	9	10	-	-	9	-	7	2	10	6	-	13	-	-	11	10	44
8	(Sweden) Arne Kring	Husqvarna	-	-	-	-	4	-	7	2	-	4	7	-	-	-	10	-	2	9	1	2	-	-	4	3	42
9	(Czech Republic) Jaroslav Falta	ČZ	-	-	2	26	-	9	-	-	-	9	3	-	6	4	9	5	6	5	9	8	1	2	-	-	39
10	(Soviet Union) Pavel Rulev	ČZ	-	-	4	5	-	-	-	-	3	5	-	-	-	-	-	-	-	-	-	-	-	-	-	-	38
10	(Soviet Union) Pavel Rulev	KTM	-	-	-	-	-	-	-	-	-	-	13	5	-	-	1	-	7	4	4	3	-	-	2	-	38
11	(Soviet Union) Gennady Moiseyev	ČZ	3	-	5	4	5	1	9	-	6	-	-	-	-	-	-	6	-	-	-	-	19	9			38
11	(Soviet Union) Gennady Moiseyev	KTM	-	-	-	-	-	-	-	-	-	-	-	-	-	-	-		-	-	-	-			6	1	38
12	(Soviet Union) Vladimir Kavinov	ČZ	7	-	-	2	3	-	2	1	-	-	2	4	8	2	-	-	-	-	-	-	-	-	-	-	33
13	(Belgium) Gaston Rahier	Husqvarna	4	4	10	9	15	8	-	7	8	6	6	-	10	8	-	-	-	-	-	-	-	-	-	-	23
14	(Sweden) Olle Pettersson	Kawasaki	9	-	6	6	-	7	-	-	-	-	11	-	7	7	-	-	-	-	-	7	-	5	7	7	18
15	(West Germany) Herbert Schmitz	Maico	-	-	-	-	-	-	8	-	-	-	5	7	-	-	-	-	8	8	-	6	-	-	9	6	13
16	(Belgium) Marcel Wiertz	Bultaco	-	6	-	-	-	-	-	-	-	-	9	8	12	10	-	-	-	-	-	10	14	-	16	8	13
17	(Czech Republic) Jiří Churavý	ČZ	-	-	-	-	-	-	-	-	-	-	-	-	-	-	-	-	-	-	-	-	4	6	8	4	12
18	(Sweden) Torleif Hansen	Husqvarna	-	-	-	-	-	-	-	10	-	-	-	-	-	-	-	-	-	-	7	4	8	13	-	-	9
19	(Netherlands) Jo Lammers	Maico	-	-	15	14	7	5	-	-	-	-	-	-	-	-	-	-	-	-	-	-	16	16	-	-	6
20	(Denmark) Erling Klinke	ČZ	-	7	22	23	-	-	-	-	-	-	-	-	-	-	-	-	-	-	-	-	20	15	-	-	5
20	(United Kingdom) Jim Aird	AJS	10	-	14	-	-	-	-	-	-	-	-	-	-	-	-	-	-	-	8	-	9	7	-	-	5
22	(Denmark) Ole Ottoson	Husqvarna	-	8	23	24	-	-	-	-	-	-	-	-	-	-	-	-	-	-	-	-	18	-	-	-	4
22	(Soviet Union) Anatoly Mandritchenko	ČZ	-	-	-	-	-	-	-	-	-	-	-	-	-	-	-	7	-	-	-	-	-	-	-	-	4
22	(United Kingdom) Vic Allan	Bultaco	-	-	-	-	-	-	-	-	-	-	-	-	-	-	-	-	-	-	-	-	11	8	-	-	4
25	(United Kingdom) Rob Taylor	Maico	-	-	-	-	-	-	-	-	-	-	-	-	-	-	-	-	-	-	-	-	10	10	-	-	3
25	(East Germany) Helmut Schadenberg	ČZ	-	-	-	-	-	-	-	-	-	-	-	-	-	11	-	9	-	-	-	-	-	-	-	-	3
25	(Sweden) Kjell Thorne	Husqvarna	-	-	-	-	-	-	-	-	-	-	-	-	-	-	-	-	-	-	-	12	-	-	-	-	3
28	(Belgium) Harry Everts	Puch	-	-	-	-	-	-	-	-	-	-	-	-	11	9	-	-	-	-	-	-	-	-	-	-	2
28	(Bulgaria) Velicko Manilov	ČZ	-	-	-	-	-	-	-	-	-	-	-	-	-	-	-	10	-	-	-	-	-	-	-	-	2
28	(Sweden) Bjorn Casseborg	Husqvarna	-	-	-	-	-	-	-	-	-	-	-	-	-	-	-	-	-	-	-	11	-	-	-	-	2
31	(France) Jean-Claude Nowak	Montesa	-	-	13	11	-	-	-	-	-	-	17	-	-	-	-	-	-	-	-	-	-	-	-	-	1
31	(Austria) Walter Leitgeb	KTM	-	-	-	-	-	-	-	-	-	15	-	-	-	-	-	-	-	-	-	-	-	-	-	-	1
31	(West Germany) Werner Schutz	Maico	-	-	16	12	-	-	-	-	10	-	12	-	-	-	-	-	-	-	6	-	-	-	-	-	1
31	(Norway) Roger Smestad	Husqvarna	-	-	-	-	-	-	-	-	-	-	-	-	-	-	-	-	9	10	-	-	-	-	-	-	1
31	(Sweden) Orjan Eklund	Husqvarna	-	-	-	-	-	-	-	-	-	-	-	-	-	-	-	-	-	-	10	-	-	-	-	-	1
31	(Spain) Domingo Gris	Bultaco	-	-	12	15	-	-	-	-	-	-	-	-	-	-	-	-	-	-	-	-	-	-	12	-	1
