= 1968 FIM Motocross World Championship =

Motocross championship season

- Organizer: FIM
- Duration: 2 April/20 August
- Number of races: 26
- Number of manufacturers: 8

Champions
- 500cc: (East Germany) Paul Friedrichs
- 250cc: (Belgium) Joël Robert

FIM Motocross World Championship
- ← 1967 1969 →

The 1968 Motocross World Championship was the 12th edition of the Motocross World Championship organized by the FIM and reserved for 500cc and 250cc motorcycles.

== Summary ==
ČZ factory-sponsored Paul Friedrichs overcame a late-season charge by BSA factory team rider John Banks to win his third consecutive 500cc World Championship by a single point over his British competitor. The championship wasn't decided until the final round in Switzerland, where Friedrichs, Banks, and Åke Jonsson (Husqvarna) each had a mathematical chance of winning the world championship.

Friedrichs won the season-ending Swiss Grand Prix to claim the 500cc World Championship by a narrow margin over Banks. Banks actually scored more points overall but fell victim to FIM scoring rules, which only recognize the top seven of thirteen results. The rules would be changed in 1977. Friedrichs won four of the thirteen Grand Prix events to become the first three-time winner of the premier 500cc displacement class since the inception of the Motocross World Championships in 1957. In the face of the rapid development of two-stroke engine technology, the BSA factory was the last remaining manufacturer to compete with four-stroke engines.

Joël Robert and Torsten Hallman once again battled for supremacy in the 250cc class. The ČZ factory switched Dave Bickers from the 500cc class to the 250cc class and hired 23-year-old Sylvain Geboers to support Robert, while the Husqvarna team hired Håkan Andersson in support of Hallman. Andersson won the Czechoslovak Grand Prix to become an early title contender; however, he suffered a broken leg at the Dutch Grand Prix and was forced to withdraw from the competition. After Robert won three consecutive Grand Prix races in France, Holland, and West Germany to take the early points lead, Hallman then won three races in Russia, Yugoslavia, and Sweden to tie Robert for the championship points lead as they went into the final round in Austria, where Robert won the event to clinch the World Championship by two points over Hallman. Suzuki became the first Japanese manufacturer to win a Motocross World Championship heat race when Olle Pettersson rode a Suzuki to win the first heat race at the 250cc Belgian Grand Prix in Genk.

== Grands Prix ==
=== 500cc ===
Round	Date	Grand Prix	Location	Race 1 Winner	Race 2 Winner	Overall Winner	Report
1	April 21	(Austria) Austrian Grand Prix	Sittendorf	(East Germany) Paul Friedrichs	(United Kingdom) John Banks	(Sweden) Bengt Åberg	Report
2	May 12	(Italy) Italian Grand Prix	Gallarate	(Belgium) Roger De Coster	(Belgium) Roger De Coster	(Belgium) Roger De Coster	Report
3	May 19	(Sweden) Swedish Grand Prix	Motala	(Sweden) Åke Jonsson	(East Germany) Paul Friedrichs	(Sweden) Åke Jonsson	Report
4	May 26	(Finland) Finnish Grand Prix	Tikkurila	(East Germany) Paul Friedrichs	(United Kingdom) John Banks	(East Germany) Paul Friedrichs	Report
5	June 9	(East Germany) East German Grand Prix	Apolda	(East Germany) Paul Friedrichs	(East Germany) Paul Friedrichs	(East Germany) Paul Friedrichs	Report
6	June 16	(Czechoslovakia) Czechoslovak Grand Prix	Přerov	(East Germany) Paul Friedrichs	(East Germany) Paul Friedrichs	(East Germany) Paul Friedrichs	Report
7	July 7	(United Kingdom) British Grand Prix	Farleigh Castle	(United Kingdom) Vic Eastwood	(Sweden) Åke Jonsson	(United Kingdom) Vic Eastwood	Report
8	July 14	(West Germany) West German Grand Prix	Beuren	(East Germany) Paul Friedrichs	(West Germany) Adolf Weil	(Sweden) Åke Jonsson	Report
9	July 21	(France) French Grand Prix	Bellême	(Belgium) Roger De Coster	(United Kingdom) John Banks	(United Kingdom) John Banks	Report
10	July 28	(Netherlands) Dutch Grand Prix	Sint Anthonis	(United Kingdom) John Banks	(United Kingdom) John Banks	(United Kingdom) John Banks	Report
11	August 4	(Belgium) Belgian Grand Prix	Namur	(United Kingdom) John Banks	(East Germany) Paul Friedrichs	(Sweden) Bengt Åberg	Report
12	August 11	Luxembourg Grand Prix	Ettelbruck	(East Germany) Paul Friedrichs	(United Kingdom) Vic Eastwood	(United Kingdom) Vic Eastwood	Report
13	August 18	(Switzerland) Swiss Grand Prix	Wohlen	(Sweden) Bengt Åberg	(United Kingdom) Vic Eastwood	(East Germany) Paul Friedrichs	Report

=== 250cc ===
Round	Date	Grand Prix	Location	Race 1 Winner	Race 2 Winner	Overall Winner	Report
1	March 31	(Spain) Spanish Grand Prix	Sabadell	(Belgium) Joël Robert	(Sweden) Torsten Hallman	(Sweden) Torsten Hallman	Report
2	April 28	(Belgium) Belgian Grand Prix	Genk	(Sweden) Olle Pettersson	(Sweden) Håkan Andersson	(Belgium) Sylvain Geboers	Report
3	May 5	(Czechoslovakia) Czechoslovak Grand Prix	Holice	(Sweden) Håkan Andersson	(Sweden) Håkan Andersson	(Sweden) Håkan Andersson	Report
4	May 12	(France) French Grand Prix	Thouars	(Belgium) Joël Robert	(Sweden) Håkan Andersson	(Belgium) Joël Robert	Report
5	May 19	(Netherlands) Dutch Grand Prix	Markelo	(Belgium) Joël Robert	(Belgium) Joël Robert	(Belgium) Joël Robert	Report
6	May 23	(West Germany) West German Grand Prix	Bielstein	(Belgium) Joël Robert	(Sweden) Torsten Hallman	(Belgium) Joël Robert	Report
7	May 26	Luxembourg Grand Prix	Schifflange	(Sweden) Torsten Hallman	(Belgium) Joël Robert	(Sweden) Torsten Hallman	Report
8	June 16	(Poland) Polish Grand Prix	Szczecin	(Belgium) Joël Robert	(Sweden) Torsten Hallman	(Belgium) Joël Robert	Report
9	June 23	(Soviet Union) Russian Grand Prix	Lviv	(Czechoslovakia) Karel Konečný	(Sweden) Torsten Hallman	(Sweden) Torsten Hallman	Report
10	June 30	(Socialist Federal Republic of Yugoslavia) Yugoslavian Grand Prix	Tržič	(Sweden) Torsten Hallman	(Sweden) Torsten Hallman	(Sweden) Torsten Hallman	Report
11	July 27	(Finland) Finnish Grand Prix	Hyvinkää	(Finland) Kalevi Vehkonen	(Finland) Kalevi Vehkonen	(Finland) Kalevi Vehkonen	Report
12	August 4	(Sweden) Swedish Grand Prix	Hedemora	(Belgium) Joël Robert	(Finland) Heikki Mikkola	(Sweden) Torsten Hallman	Report
13	August 11	(United Kingdom) British Grand Prix	Dodington Park	(Belgium) Joël Robert	(Belgium) Joël Robert	(Belgium) Joël Robert	Report
14	October 6	(Austria) Austrian Grand Prix	Launsdorf	(Belgium) Joël Robert	(Belgium) Joël Robert	(Belgium) Joël Robert	Report

== Final standings ==
Points are awarded to the top 6 classified finishers. For the 500cc final championship standings, the 7 best of 13 results are retained. For the 250cc final championship standings, the 7 best of 14 results are retained.

Position	1st	2nd	3rd	4th	5th	6th
Points	8	6	4	3	2	1

=== 500cc ===
(Results in italics indicate overall winner)

Pos	Rider	Machine	AUT (Austria)		ITA (Italy)		SWE (Sweden)		FIN (Finland)		GDR (East Germany)		TCH (Czechoslovakia)		UK (United Kingdom)		GER (West Germany)		FRA (France)		NED (Netherlands)		BEL (Belgium)		LUX (Luxembourg)		CH (Switzerland)		Points
Pos	Rider	Machine	R1	R2	R1	R2	R1	R2	R1	R2	R1	R2	R1	R2	R1	R2	R1	R2	R1	R2	R1	R2	R1	R2	R1	R2	R1	R2	
1	(East Germany) Paul Friedrichs	ČZ	1	18	NC	-	-	1	1	2	1	1	1	1	-	-	1	-	-	-	-	-	8	1	1	3	2	2	42
2	(United Kingdom) John Banks	BSA	30	1	-	-	-	-	5	1	4	4	3	2	-	-	8	4	2	1	1	1	1	4	6	2	3	5	41
3	(Sweden) Åke Jonsson	Husqvarna	-	6	NC	-	1	6	2	4	6	3	4	3	-	1	3	2	5	6	-	7	-	-	7	4	4	4	34
4	(Sweden) Bengt Åberg	Husqvarna	2	2	NC	-	-	2	-	-	-	-	-	-	9	10	2	3	37	2	6	-	3	2	4	5	1	10	29
5	(Belgium) Roger De Coster	ČZ	11	-	1	1	5	5	-	-	-	-	-	-	5	6	10	-	1	3	4	12	4	-	-	-	7	-	21
6	(United Kingdom) Vic Eastwood	Husqvarna	-	-	NC	-	-	4	-	-	9	2	-	-	1	2	4	-	29	30	3	-	2	-	2	1	-	1	17
7	(Czechoslovakia) Petr Dobrý	ČZ	-	-	6	2	-	-	-	-	2	6	2	5	3	3	-	-	13	7	-	-	7	7	-	-	11	-	16
8	(United Kingdom) Jeff Smith	BSA	25	-	NC	-	-	-	3	3	10	10	6	-	6	8	-	-	6	5	5	5	5	6	-	-	5	3	16
9	(Belgium) Jeff Teuwissen	Husqvarna	8	26	-	-	-	-	-	-	-	-	7	7	-	-	-	7	3	4	2	2	6	3	11	-	-	-	14
10	(Sweden) Christer Hammargren	Husqvarna	9	8	NC	-	4	3	-	-	8	7	-	-	2	5	7	5	31	-	8	-	16	21	-	8	-	6	13
11	(Czechoslovakia) Vlastimil Válek	ČZ	4	24	8	-	3	-	-	-	3	5	-	-	-	-	6	8	7	27	17	11	10	8	3	6	6	7	13
12	(Czechoslovakia) Václav Švastal	ČZ	3	7	5	4	-	-	-	-	7	8	-	-	7	12	-	-	4	8	-	-	17	9	8	7	-	-	8
13	(Soviet Union) Vilis Brunis	ČZ	5	3	4	-	-	-	-	-	15	12	-	-	-	-	-	-	-	-	-	-	-	-	-	-	-	-	6
14	(United Kingdom) Allan Clough	Husqvarna	26	-	3	3	-	-	-	-	-	-	-	-	10	13	-	-	36	36	-	-	19	18	-	-	-	-	4
15	(West Germany) Wolfgang Müller	Maico	-	-	9	-	-	-	-	-	-	-	-	-	-	-	5	6	-	-	12	13	-	-	-	-	8	8	4
15	(Soviet Union) Vladimir Pogrebniak	ČZ	7	4	NC	-	2	-	-	-	11	17	-	-	-	-	-	-	-	-	-	-	-	-	-	-	-	-	4
17	(East Germany) Heinz Hoppe	ČZ	10	9	NC	-	-	-	4	-	13	13	5	6	-	-	-	-	-	-	-	15	18	12	10	12	-	-	3
18	(United Kingdom) Dave Bickers	ČZ	-	-	-	-	-	-	-	-	-	-	-	-	4	4	-	-	-	-	-	-	-	-	-	-	-	-	3
19	(Netherlands) Pierre Karsmakers	ČZ	-	-	-	-	-	-	-	-	-	-	-	-	-	-	-	-	8	9	7	6	13	14	-	-	-	-	3
20	(West Germany) Adolf Weil	Maico	12	5	-	-	-	-	-	-	-	-	-	-	-	-	-	1	-	-	-	-	-	-	-	-	-	-	2
20	(West Germany) Erwin Schmider	Maico	-	-	7	6	-	-	-	-	-	-	-	-	-	-	15	12	-	-	-	-	-	-	-	-	-	-	2
22	(United Kingdom) Keith Hickman	BSA	-	-	-	-	-	-	-	-	5	14	8	4	8	9	-	-	40	-	-	-	-	-	5	-	-	-	2
22	(Netherlands) Gerrit Wolsink	Husqvarna	-	-	-	-	-	-	-	-	-	-	-	-	-	-	-	-	-	-	9	4	25	16	-	-	-	-	2
22	(Soviet Union) Gunnar Draugs	ČZ	6	23	NC	-	-	-	6	6	12	9	11	-	-	-	-	-	-	-	-	-	-	-	-	-	-	-	2
25	(Sweden) Jan Johansson	Lindstrom	-	10	-	-	6	-	8	5	-	-	-	-	-	-	-	-	-	-	-	-	-	-	-	-	-	-	1
25	(Belgium) Gaston Rahier	ČZ	-	-	-	-	-	-	-	-	-	-	-	-	-	-	-	-	-	-	-	-	9	5	-	9	-	-	1
-	(Soviet Union) Yuri Matveev	ČZ	-	-	2	-	-	-	-	-	-	-	-	-	-	-	-	-	-	-	-	-	-	-	-	-	-	-	0
-	(Netherlands) Frans Sigmans	Husqvarna	-	-	-	-	-	-	-	-	-	-	-	-	-	-	-	-	-	-	-	3	-	-	-	-	-	-	0

=== 250cc ===
(Results in italics indicate overall winner)

Pos	Rider	Machine	ESP (Spain)		BEL (Belgium)		TCH (Czechoslovakia)		FRA (France)		NED (Netherlands)		GER (West Germany)		LUX (Luxembourg)		POL (Poland)		USSR (Soviet Union)		YUG (Socialist Federal Republic of Yugoslavia)		FIN (Finland)		SWE (Sweden)		UK (United Kingdom)		AUT (Austria)		Pts
Pos	Rider	Machine	R1	R2	R1	R2	R1	R2	R1	R2	R1	R2	R1	R2	R1	R2	R1	R2	R1	R2	R1	R2	R1	R2	R1	R2	R1	R2	R1	R2	
1	(Belgium) Joël Robert	ČZ	1	4	4	-	2	2	1	2	1	1	1	2	3	1	1	2	-	-	-	8	2	2	1	-	1	1	1	1	54
2	(Sweden) Torsten Hallman	Husqvarna	2	1	-	-	-	-	2	-	8	3	3	1	1	2	7	1	2	1	1	1	3	-	4	2	2	2	2	-	52
3	(Belgium) Sylvain Geboers	ČZ	5	5	2	2	5	4	5	3	3	6	14	-	10	7	2	4	-	-	3	3	-	-	-	-	-	-	3	4	31
4	(Czechoslovakia) Karel Konečný	ČZ	-	-	-	-	6	9	6	4	32	11	5	5	11	9	3	3	1	2	2	2	7	4	-	-	5	3	6	3	29
5	(United Kingdom) Dave Bickers	ČZ	6	3	6	8	7	-	4	7	24	-	8	12	2	3	-	-	4	3	5	7	-	-	7	6	3	4	7	5	21
6	(Sweden) Håkan Andersson	Husqvarna	-	2	3	1	1	1	3	1	4	26	-	-	-	-	-	-	-	-	-	-	-	-	-	-	-	-	-	-	18
7	(Sweden) Olle Pettersson	Suzuki	-	13	1	3	8	6	11	6	6	2	4	6	6	4	-	-	-	-	-	-	-	-	-	-	-	-	-	-	18
8	(Finland) Kalevi Vehkonen	Husqvarna	-	-	-	-	-	-	-	-	-	-	-	-	-	-	-	-	-	-	-	-	1	1	-	-	-	-	8	-	8
9	(Soviet Union) Victor Arbekov	ČZ	-	-	9	4	3	3	8	5	11	27	6	4	7	-	-	-	-	-	-	-	-	-	-	-	-	-	-	-	8
10	(Finland) Heikki Mikkola	Husqvarna	-	-	-	-	-	-	-	-	-	-	-	-	-	-	-	-	-	-	-	-	6	-	6	1	-	-	9	-	7
11	(Sweden) Stig Pettersson	Husqvarna	-	-	-	-	-	-	-	-	-	-	-	-	-	-	-	-	-	-	-	-	5	5	5	5	11	-	11	-	7
12	(Belgium) Marcel Wiertz	Bultaco	3	-	8	9	14	13	-	-	18	12	13	11	12	14	-	-	-	-	-	-	-	-	-	-	10	-	5	2	6
13	(West Germany) Adolf Weil	Maico	7	8	-	-	-	-	-	-	15	18	2	3	9	5	-	-	-	-	-	-	-	-	-	-	-	-	-	-	6
14	(United Kingdom) Malcolm Davis	AJS	10	12	5	7	-	-	10	9	-	-	-	-	4	6	-	-	-	-	-	-	-	-	2	-	-	-	-	-	6
15	(Soviet Union) Gennady Moiseyev	ČZ	-	-	21	11	9	12	12	19	5	5	12	10	14	13	5	-	-	-	-	-	-	-	-	-	-	-	-	-	5
15	(Soviet Union) Leonid Shinkarenko	ČZ	-	-	10	15	-	17	9	11	2	-	-	-	5	-	4	6	5	4	4	5	-	-	-	-	-	-	-	-	5
17	(Sweden) Bengt Arne Bonn	Husqvarna	17	11	-	-	-	-	-	-	-	-	11	16	19	16	-	5	-	-	-	-	4	3	-	3	-	-	-	-	4
18	(Finland) Jyrki Storm	Husqvarna	-	-	-	6	28	7	16	13	7	4	19	17	18	15	-	-	-	-	-	-	-	-	-	4	9	6	-	-	4
19	(Czechoslovakia) Jiří Stodůlka	ČZ	-	-	13	18	4	5	31	12	22	9	15	7	13	8	-	-	-	-	6	6	-	-	-	-	7	7	10	-	4
20	(Soviet Union) Evgeny Petushkov	ČZ	-	-	11	10	15	14	13	10	17	-	9	8	8	10	-	-	-	-	-	4	-	-	-	-	-	-	-	-	3
20	(Soviet Union) Vilis Brunis	ČZ	-	-	-	-	-	-	-	-	-	-	-	-	-	-	-	-	3	5	-	-	-	-	-	-	-	-	-	-	3
22	(United Kingdom) Don Rickman	Bultaco	4	6	-	-	-	-	-	-	-	-	-	-	-	-	-	-	-	-	-	-	-	-	-	-	-	-	-	-	2
22	(United Kingdom) Bryan Wade	Greeves	-	-	-	-	-	-	7	8	9	7	-	-	-	-	-	-	-	-	-	-	-	-	3	-	4	5	-	-	2
22	(Sweden) Torleif Hansen	Husqvarna	-	-	-	-	-	-	-	-	-	-	-	-	-	-	6	-	-	-	-	-	-	-	-	-	12	-	4	6	2
25	(Sweden) Uno Palm	Husqvarna	-	-	-	-	-	-	-	-	-	-	-	-	-	-	-	-	6	6	-	-	-	-	-	-	-	-	-	-	1
25	(Sweden) Yngve Holmqvist	Husqvarna	-	-	-	-	-	-	-	-	-	-	-	-	-	-	-	-	-	-	-	-	-	-	-	7	-	-	-	-	1
25	(United Kingdom) Vic Allan	Greeves	-	-	-	-	-	-	-	-	-	-	-	-	-	-	-	-	-	-	-	-	-	-	-	-	6	8	-	-	1
-	(Belgium) Gaston Rahier	ČZ	13	10	7	12	-	-	-	14	-	-	-	-	16	11	-	-	-	-	-	-	-	-	-	-	-	-	-	-	0
-	(Belgium) Roger De Coster	ČZ	-	-	-	5	-	-	-	-	-	-	-	-	-	-	-	-	-	-	-	-	-	-	-	-	-	-	-	-	0
