= 1969 FIM Motocross World Championship =

Motocross championship season

1968 FIM Motocross World Championship
- Organizer: FIM
- Duration: 13 April/31 August
- Number of races: 24
- Number of manufacturers: 10

Champions
- 500cc: (Sweden) Bengt Åberg
- 250cc: (Belgium) Joël Robert

FIM Motocross World Championship
- ← 1968 1970 →

The 1969 Motocross World Championship was the 13th edition of the Motocross World Championship organized by the FIM and reserved for 500cc and 250cc motorcycles. The FIM implements a new championship points scoring formula, awarding points to the top ten classified competitors.

== Summary ==
Husqvarna factory-sponsored rider Bengt Åberg dethroned three-time World Champion Paul Friedrichs to win his first 500cc World Championship. Husqvarna introduced a new motorcycle with a larger 400cc engine to claim their first 500cc World Championship since Rolf Tibblin won the 1963 title. BSA factory team rider John Banks once again proved to be one of the top competitors; however, mechanical problems late in the season relegated him to second place in the championship for the second consecutive season. Defending World Champion Friedrichs took third place in the final standings.

Two-time 500cc World Champion Jeff Smith makes his final World Championship appearance at the 1969 500cc Belgian Grand Prix. Two-time 250cc European Champion Dave Bickers marks the final World Championship appearance of his career with a victory in the second moto of the 1969 250cc British Grand Prix.

In the 250cc World Championship, Joël Robert won six Grand Prix races to successfully defend his championship in a season-long battle with his ČZ factory teammate Sylvain Geboers. Geboers actually scored more points overall but fell victim to FIM scoring rules, which only recognized the top seven of twelve results. The rules would be changed in 1977. Suzuki factory rider Olle Pettersson demonstrated the Japanese factory's rapid development by placing third in the final standings. Four-time World Champion Torsten Hallman was slowed by a back injury and dropped to sixth place in the final standings. He was released by the Husqvarna factory team after the 1969 season.

== Grands Prix ==
=== 500cc ===
Round	Date	Grand Prix	Location	Race 1 Winner	Race 2 Winner	Overall Winner	Report
1	April 20	(Austria) Austrian Grand Prix	Sittendorf	(Sweden) Bengt Åberg	(East Germany) Paul Friedrichs	(Sweden) Bengt Åberg	Report
2	May 11	(Sweden) Swedish Grand Prix	Motala	(Sweden) Arne Kring	(East Germany) Arne Kring	(Sweden) Arne Kring	Report
3	May 18	(Netherlands) Dutch Grand Prix	Norg	(Sweden) Arne Kring	(United Kingdom) John Banks	(Sweden) Arne Kring	Report
4	May 25	(Italy) Italian Grand Prix	Lombardore	(Sweden) Bengt Åberg	(Sweden) Bengt Åberg	(Sweden) Bengt Åberg	Report
5	June 15	(Czechoslovakia) Czechoslovak Grand Prix	Přerov	(East Germany) Paul Friedrichs	(United Kingdom) John Banks	(United Kingdom) John Banks	Report
6	June 22	(Soviet Union) Russian Grand Prix	Chișinău	(United Kingdom) John Banks	(East Germany) Paul Friedrichs	(United Kingdom) John Banks	Report
7	July 13	(West Germany) West German Grand Prix	Beuren	(East Germany) Paul Friedrichs	(Czechoslovakia) Jaroslav Homola	(East Germany) Paul Friedrichs	Report
8	August 3	(Belgium) Belgian Grand Prix	Namur	(Belgium) Roger De Coster	(United Kingdom) John Banks	(Belgium) Roger De Coster	Report
9	August 10	Luxembourg Grand Prix	Ettelbruck	(United Kingdom) Dave Nicoll	(East Germany) Paul Friedrichs	(United Kingdom) Dave Nicoll	Report
10	August 17	(France) French Grand Prix	Laguépie	(Sweden) Bengt Åberg	(East Germany) Paul Friedrichs	(Sweden) Bengt Åberg	Report
11	August 24	(Switzerland) Swiss Grand Prix	Wohlen	(Sweden) Bengt Åberg	(Sweden) Åke Jonsson	(Sweden) Bengt Åberg	Report
12	August 31	(East Germany) East German Grand Prix	Schwerin	(East Germany) Paul Friedrichs	(Belgium) Roger De Coster	(Sweden) Arne Kring	Report

=== 250cc ===
Round	Date	Grand Prix	Location	Race 1 Winner	Race 2 Winner	Overall Winner	Report
1	April 13	(Spain) Spanish Grand Prix	Sabadell	(Belgium) Joël Robert	(Sweden) Olle Pettersson	(Belgium) Joël Robert	Report
2	April 20	(Belgium) Swiss Grand Prix	Payerne	(Belgium) Joël Robert	(Finland) Kalevi Vehkhonen	(Belgium) Joël Robert	Report
3	April 27	(Socialist Federal Republic of Yugoslavia) Yugoslavian Grand Prix	Tržič	(Belgium) Joël Robert	(Belgium) Joël Robert	(Belgium) Joël Robert	Report
4	May 4	(Czechoslovakia) Czechoslovak Grand Prix	Holice	(Belgium) Sylvain Geboers	(Belgium) Sylvain Geboers	(Belgium) Sylvain Geboers	Report
5	May 11	(Poland) Polish Grand Prix	Szczecin	(Belgium) Joël Robert	(Belgium) Joël Robert	(Belgium) Joël Robert	Report
6	May 18	(West Germany) West German Grand Prix	Bielstein	(West Germany) Adolf Weil	(West Germany) Adolf Weil	(West Germany) Adolf Weil	Report
7	June 15	(Netherlands) Dutch Grand Prix	Makkinga	(Belgium) Sylvain Geboers	(Finland) Heikki Mikkola	(Belgium) Sylvain Geboers	Report
8	June 22	(France) French Grand Prix	Niort	(Belgium) Joël Robert	(Belgium) Joël Robert	(Belgium) Joël Robert	Report
9	June 29	(United Kingdom) British Grand Prix	Dodington Park	(Belgium) Sylvain Geboers	(United Kingdom) Dave Bickers	(Belgium) Sylvain Geboers	Report
10	August 3	(Sweden) Swedish Grand Prix	Hedemora	(Belgium) Sylvain Geboers	(Belgium) Sylvain Geboers	(Belgium) Sylvain Geboers	Report
11	August 10	(Finland) Finnish Grand Prix	Hyvinkää	(Finland) Kalevi Vehkonen	(Sweden) Olle Pettersson	(Belgium) Joël Robert	Report
12	August 17	(Soviet Union) Russian Grand Prix	Leningrad	(Soviet Union) Vladimir Kavinov	(Soviet Union) Vladimir Kavinov	(Soviet Union) Vladimir Kavinov	Report

== Final standings ==
Points are awarded to the top 10 classified finishers. For the 250cc and 500cc final championship standings, the 7 best of 12 results are retained.

Position	1	2	3	4	5	6	7	8	9	10
Points	15	12	10	8	6	5	4	3	2	1

=== 500cc ===
(Results in italics indicate overall winner)

Pos	Rider	Machine	AUT (Austria)		SWE (Sweden)		NED (Netherlands)		ITA (Italy)		TCH (Czechoslovakia)		USSR (Soviet Union)		GER (West Germany)		BEL (Belgium)		LUX (Luxembourg)		FRA (France)		CH (Switzerland)		GDR (East Germany)		Points
Pos	Rider	Machine	R1	R2	R1	R2	R1	R2	R1	R2	R1	R2	R1	R2	R1	R2	R1	R2	R1	R2	R1	R2	R1	R2	R1	R2	
1	(Sweden) Bengt Åberg	Husqvarna	1	4	2	2	2	31	1	1	9	4	-	-	3	3	-	4	4	2	1	2	1	2	4	4	94
2	(United Kingdom) John Banks	BSA	7	2	-	-	3	1	-	3	2	1	1	2	-	-	2	1	3	-	-	-	-	-	5	7	72
3	(East Germany) Paul Friedrichs	ČZ	39	1	7	-	-	-	-	-	1	-	2	1	1	5	5	6	5	1	2	1	4	4	1	-	67
4	(Sweden) Arne Kring	Husqvarna	-	-	1	1	1	2	3	-	4	3	-	-	2	6	-	-	-	-	8	8	-	-	2	2	66
5	(Belgium) Roger De Coster	ČZ	20	5	-	-	7	30	4	4	7	8	-	-	8	10	1	2	-	-	3	4	3	3	3	1	66
6	(United Kingdom) Dave Nicoll	BSA	4	-	-	-	15	12	2	2	-	-	-	-	7	8	8	14	1	3	-	-	11	6	6	8	40
7	(United Kingdom) Keith Hickman	BSA	5	7	-	-	-	-	-	-	-	-	4	4	5	2	7	10	6	-	5	6	7	13	-	-	38
8	(Sweden) Christer Hammargren	Husqvarna	-	-	5	3	8	6	-	-	-	-	-	-	-	7	16	8	15	-	6	5	5	10	7	3	35
9	(Belgium) Jeff Teuwissen	Husqvarna	-	-	11	9	5	3	12	-	12	5	-	-	-	-	4	5	7	5	-	-	-	-	-	-	32
10	(Czechoslovakia) Jaroslav Homola	Jawa	-	-	-	-	-	-	-	-	3	-	3	3	6	1	10	22	2	-	4	12	6	8	8	5	31
11	(Sweden) Jan Johansson	Husqvarna	6	11	3	6	9	8	-	-	6	7	-	-	-	-	-	-	11	7	-	-	-	-	-	-	28
12	(Czechoslovakia) Otakar Toman	ČZ	12	6	-	8	13	11	7	-	-	-	6	-	-	-	9	12	9	4	-	-	-	9	-	-	25
13	(Sweden) Åke Jonsson	Maico	-	-	8	11	-	-	5	-	10	11	5	5	10	4	-	-	8	-	-	-	-	-	-	-	25
14	(West Germany) Adolf Weil	Maico	36	3	4	7	-	-	17	12	11	2	-	-	4	-	3	3	10	-	-	3	2	-	-	-	21
15	(Czechoslovakia) Miroslav Lisý	ČZ	2	8	-	-	17	14	6	5	-	-	-	-	-	-	22	20	19	-	9	13	-	-	22	-	20
16	(Sweden) Jan Erik Sallqvist	Husqvarna	9	9	6	5	-	-	16	8	-	-	-	-	-	-	-	-	-	-	20	9	-	-	-	-	13
17	(Netherlands) Gerrit Wolsink	Husqvarna	10	10	-	4	30	7	-	-	-	-	-	-	-	-	14	11	12	9	7	7	19	5	12	20	13
18	(Czechoslovakia) Jiří Schmalz	ČZ	-	-	-	-	-	-	-	-	5	6	-	-	-	-	-	-	-	-	-	-	-	-	15	11	10
19	(Netherlands) Frans Sigmans	Husqvarna	-	-	-	-	4	5	-	-	-	-	-	-	-	-	-	-	-	-	-	-	-	-	-	-	8
20	(France) Jacques Vernier	ČZ	-	-	-	-	-	-	14	9	-	-	-	-	-	-	20	16	14	6	19	-	-	-	-	-	8
21	(Netherlands) Jo Lammers	ČZ	-	-	-	-	6	4	-	-	-	-	-	-	-	-	-	-	-	-	-	-	-	-	-	-	6
22	(Italy) Eugenio Perozzo	ČZ	-	-	-	-	-	-	8	6	-	-	-	-	-	-	-	-	-	-	16	20	-	-	-	-	6
23	(Belgium) Jaak van Velthoven	Husqvarna	8	12	9	-	-	-	-	-	14	-	-	-	-	-	13	17	18	-	-	-	10	7	-	-	6
24	(East Germany) Heinz Hoppe	ČZ	-	-	-	-	-	-	-	-	-	-	-	-	-	-	17	-	13	8	-	18	-	-	9	6	6
25	(Italy) Giuseppe Cavallero	ČZ	-	-	-	-	-	-	10	7	-	-	-	-	-	-	-	-	-	-	11	16	-	-	-	-	5
26	(United Kingdom) Jeff Smith	BSA	-	-	-	-	-	-	-	-	-	-	-	-	-	-	6	7	-	-	-	-	-	-	-	-	5
27	(Soviet Union) Antonin Klavinsh	ČZ	-	-	-	-	-	-	-	-	-	-	-	6	-	-	-	-	-	-	-	-	-	-	10	9	5
28	(Soviet Union) Viatcheslav Krasnotchekov	ČZ	-	-	-	-	-	-	-	-	-	-	-	7	-	-	-	-	-	-	-	-	-	-	14	-	4
29	(Netherlands) Jo Keizer	Husqvarna	-	-	-	-	10	9	-	-	-	-	-	-	-	-	12	18	16	-	10	-	-	-	16	12	3
30	(Italy) Silvano Benso	ČZ	-	-	-	-	-	-	13	10	-	-	-	-	-	-	-	-	-	-	-	-	-	-	-	-	3
31	(West Germany) Willy Bauer	Maico	-	-	-	-	-	-	-	-	-	-	-	-	9	9	-	-	-	-	-	-	-	-	-	-	2
32	(Netherlands) Henk Driessen	ČZ	-	-	-	-	12	10	-	-	-	-	-	-	-	-	-	-	-	-	-	-	-	-	-	-	2
33	(Soviet Union) Vladimir Ovchinikov	ČZ	-	-	-	-	-	-	-	-	-	-	-	9	-	-	-	-	-	-	-	-	-	-	-	-	2
34	(Czechoslovakia) Václav Švastal	ČZ	3	-	-	-	18	15	15	11	8	14	-	-	-	-	-	-	-	-	-	-	-	-	-	-	2
35	(France) Serge Bacou	Bultaco	11	13	-	-	-	-	22	-	-	9	-	-	-	-	23	19	-	16	-	10	-	-	-	-	1
36	(Soviet Union) Vladimir Pogrebnyak	ČZ	-	-	-	-	-	-	-	-	-	-	-	10	-	-	-	-	-	-	-	-	-	-	-	-	1
37	(Belgium) Riik van Hoof	ČZ	-	-	-	-	-	-	-	-	-	-	-	-	-	-	-	-	17	11	-	-	-	-	-	-	1
38	(France) Jean Jacques Tourte	ČZ	-	-	-	-	-	-	-	-	-	-	-	-	-	-	-	-	-	-	12	11	-	-	-	-	1
39	(Soviet Union) Angus Angers	ČZ	-	-	-	-	-	-	-	-	-	10	-	-	-	-	-	-	-	-	-	-	-	-	11	10	1
-	(Belgium) Gaston Rahier	ČZ	-	-	-	-	-	-	-	-	-	-	-	-	-	-	19	9	-	-	-	-	-	-	-	-	0

=== 250cc ===
(Results in italics indicate overall winner)

Pos	Rider	Machine	ESP (Spain)		CH (Switzerland)		YUG (Socialist Federal Republic of Yugoslavia)		TCH (Czechoslovakia)		POL (Poland)		GER (West Germany)		NED (Netherlands)		FRA (France)		UK (United Kingdom)		SWE (Sweden)		FIN (Finland)		USSR (Soviet Union)		Pts
Pos	Rider	Machine	R1	R2	R1	R2	R1	R2	R1	R2	R1	R2	R1	R2	R1	R2	R1	R2	R1	R2	R1	R2	R1	R2	R1	R2	
1	(Belgium) Joël Robert	ČZ	1	4	1	3	1	1	-	-	1	1	-	-	-	-	1	1	-	-	5	-	3	2	5	2	102
2	(Belgium) Sylvain Geboers	ČZ	10	2	2	2	2	3	1	1	3	2	6	3	1	2	5	2	1	3	1	1	2	-	3	-	96
3	(Sweden) Olle Pettersson	Suzuki	-	1	7	-	6	5	3	3	5	3	3	-	2	5	2	5	-	4	2	2	7	1	-	-	71
4	(Czechoslovakia) Jiří Stodůlka	ČZ	11	6	11	-	4	6	5	7	-	9	11	2	28	22	4	6	2	6	-	-	-	5	7	-	44
5	(Czechoslovakia) Karel Konečný	ČZ	-	-	3	4	3	7	2	2	4	-	2	6	-	-	3	-	-	-	-	-	-	-	-	-	38
6	(Sweden) Torsten Hallman	Husqvarna	4	7	8	6	5	2	-	-	2	5	-	-	-	-	-	-	-	-	4	-	-	-	-	-	32
7	(Belgium) Marcel Wiertz	Bultaco	6	5	12	9	-	10	9	11	-	-	7	5	8	11	-	15	12	8	-	-	-	-	-	-	31
8	(Czechoslovakia) Zdeněk Strnad	ČZ	2	-	5	8	-	-	6	16	-	-	5	8	14	26	8	11	5	9	8	6	-	-	-	-	31
9	(Soviet Union) Vladimir Kavinov	ČZ	-	11	-	-	15	9	-	-	9	10	-	-	-	-	12	17	-	-	14	7	10	8	1	1	27
10	(Soviet Union) Gennady Moiseyev	ČZ	14	12	-	-	8	-	-	4	7	7	-	-	-	-	9	18	-	-	11	5	5	10	9	3	27
11	(Soviet Union) Leonid Shinkarenko	ČZ	9	-	9	5	11	4	4	14	6	6	-	-	-	-	11	10	-	-	-	-	-	-	-	-	18
12	(Finland) Kalevi Vehkonen	Husqvarna	7	-	4	1	-	-	-	-	-	8	-	-	15	6	13	13	-	-	-	-	1	-	-	-	17
13	(United Kingdom) Andy Roberton	AJS	5	8	10	10	10	-	7	5	-	-	4	-	19	24	-	-	-	-	-	-	-	-	-	-	17
14	(Finland) Heikki Mikkola	Husqvarna	-	-	6	7	7	8	-	-	-	-	-	-	29	1	6	3	-	-	-	-	-	3	-	4	16
15	(West Germany) Adolf Weil	Maico	-	-	-	-	-	-	-	-	-	-	1	1	-	-	-	-	-	-	-	-	-	-	-	-	15
16	(Czechoslovakia) Miroslav Halm	ČZ	-	-	-	-	-	-	8	6	-	-	-	-	-	-	-	-	-	-	3	-	-	6	2	6	15
17	(Sweden) Uno Palm	Husqvarna	-	-	-	-	-	-	10	13	-	-	-	-	11	9	14	8	8	7	15	3	4	-	4	-	14
18	(Sweden) Bengt Arne Bonn	Husqvarna	-	-	-	-	9	-	-	9	8	4	-	-	6	25	-	7	9	-	-	-	-	-	-	-	13
19	(United Kingdom) Dave Bickers	ČZ	-	-	-	-	-	-	-	-	-	-	-	-	-	-	-	-	4	1	-	-	-	-	-	-	12
20	(Finland) Jyrki Storm	Husqvarna	-	10	-	-	-	-	-	-	-	-	-	-	25	20	26	12	10	10	-	-	6	4	-	-	12
21	(United Kingdom) Don Rickman	Bultaco	8	3	-	-	-	-	-	-	-	-	-	-	-	-	-	-	-	-	-	-	-	-	-	-	10
22	(Netherlands) Pierre Karsmakers	ČZ	-	-	-	-	-	-	-	-	-	-	-	-	3	4	-	-	-	-	-	-	-	-	-	-	10
23	(Sweden) Gunnar Nilsson	Husqvarna	-	-	-	-	-	-	-	-	-	-	-	-	-	-	-	-	-	-	7	4	-	-	-	-	10
24	(Netherlands) Jan Roessink	Husqvarna	-	-	-	-	-	-	-	-	-	-	10	9	5	7	19	-	-	-	-	-	-	-	-	-	9
25	(Netherlands) Frans Sigmans	Husqvarna	-	-	-	-	-	-	-	-	-	-	-	-	4	3	-	-	-	-	-	-	-	-	-	-	8
25	(United Kingdom) Arthur Browning	Greeves	3	-	-	-	-	-	-	-	-	-	-	4	-	-	7	-	6	2	-	-	-	-	-	-	8
25	(Soviet Union) Angus Angers	ČZ	-	-	-	-	-	-	-	-	-	-	-	-	-	-	-	-	-	-	-	-	-	-	6	5	8
28	(Norway) Roger Smestad	Husqvarna	-	-	-	-	-	-	-	-	-	-	-	-	12	13	16	-	11	12	-	-	8	7	-	-	7
29	(Netherlands) Ton van Heugten	ČZ	-	-	-	-	-	-	-	-	-	-	-	-	7	8	-	-	-	-	-	-	-	-	-	-	5
29	(United Kingdom) Bryan Goss	Husqvarna	-	-	-	-	-	-	-	-	-	-	-	-	-	-	-	-	3	11	-	-	-	-	-	-	5
29	(Soviet Union) Mikhail Rastvortsev	ČZ	-	-	-	-	-	-	-	-	-	-	-	-	-	-	-	-	-	-	-	-	-	-	-	7	5
29	(Soviet Union) Pavel Rulev	ČZ	-	-	-	-	-	-	-	-	-	-	-	-	-	-	-	-	-	-	19	8	-	-	-	8	5
33	(West Germany) Willy Bauer	Maico	-	-	-	-	-	-	-	-	-	-	8	7	-	-	-	-	-	-	-	-	-	-	-	-	4
34	(United Kingdom) Malcolm Davis	AJS	-	-	-	-	-	-	-	-	-	-	-	-	21	-	10	9	-	-	-	-	-	-	-	-	3
34	(East Germany) Helmut Schumann	ČZ	-	-	-	-	-	-	-	-	-	-	-	-	-	-	-	-	-	-	-	-	-	9	-	-	3
34	(Soviet Union) Anatoly Mandritchenko	ČZ	-	-	-	-	-	-	-	-	-	-	-	-	-	-	-	-	-	-	-	-	-	-	-	9	3
37	(France) Michel Combes	Husqvarna	13	14	-	-	-	-	-	-	-	-	-	-	-	-	17	19	-	-	-	-	-	-	-	-	2
37	(Belgium) Gaston Rahier	Ossa	-	-	13	11	-	-	-	10	10	11	-	-	-	-	-	14	-	-	-	-	-	-	-	-	2
37	(United Kingdom) Jim Aird	AJS	-	-	-	-	-	-	-	-	-	-	9	12	-	-	-	-	-	-	-	-	-	-	-	-	2
37	(Finland) Jack Johansson	Husqvarna	-	-	-	-	-	-	-	-	-	-	-	-	-	-	-	-	-	-	-	-	9	-	-	-	2
41	(Spain) José Sanchez	Bultaco	12	15	-	-	-	-	-	-	-	-	-	-	-	-	-	-	-	-	-	-	-	-	-	-	1
41	(Denmark) Soren Lodal	ČZ	-	-	-	-	-	-	-	-	-	-	12	10	20	27	-	-	-	-	-	-	-	-	-	-	1
41	(Netherlands) Harry Driessen	ČZ	-	-	-	-	-	-	-	-	-	-	-	-	10	12	-	-	-	-	-	-	-	-	-	-	1
41	(East Germany) Gerhard Teubner	ČZ	-	-	-	-	-	-	-	-	-	-	-	-	-	-	-	-	-	-	20	9	-	-	-	-	1
41	(Soviet Union) Antonin Klavinsh	ČZ	-	-	-	-	-	-	-	-	-	-	-	-	-	-	-	-	-	-	-	-	-	-	-	10	1
-	(United Kingdom) Vic Allan	Greeves	-	-	-	-	-	-	-	-	-	-	-	-	-	-	-	4	-	-	-	-	-	-	-	-	0
-	(United Kingdom) Chris Horsfield	Bultaco	-	-	-	-	-	-	-	-	-	-	-	-	-	-	-	-	-	5	-	-	-	-	-	-	0
