= Paul Friedrichs =

East German motocross racer (1940–2012)

- Friedrichs in 1964
- Nationality: German
- Born: 21 March 1940 Buchholz, Mecklenburg-Vorpommern
- Died: 30 August 2012 (aged 72) Erfurt

Motocross career
- Years active: 1961–1972
- Teams: CZ
- Championships: 500cc – 1966–1968
- Wins: 29

Paul Friedrichs (21 March 1940 – 30 August 2012) was an East German motocross and enduro racer. He competed in the FIM Motocross World Championships from 1961 to 1972. Despite not being able to compete in nations like West Germany due to political tensions at the height of the Cold War, Friedrichs was still able to win three consecutive Motocross World Championships between 1966 to 1968.

== Biography ==
=== Early life ===
Friedrichs was born in Buchholz and grew up in Mecklenburg where he joined the motor sports clubs MC tractor Franzburg, MC Dynamo Rostock and Sportvereinigung (SV) Dynamo. He entered his first motocross race at the age of 18 aboard a German-made MZ motorcycle. With the training offered by the clubs, he developed into one of the most accomplished motocross and enduro racers of his era. Although he was training to become a policeman, he showed enough promise as a motorcycle racer that he was promoted within both his SC Dynamo Berlin sports organization as well as his police organization.

=== World championships ===
At the age of 21, Friedrichs scored in his first Motocross World Championship points at the 1961 250cc East German Grand Prix riding an ESO motorcycle. In 1963, he joined the ČZ factory racing team. ČZ was one of the first motorcycle manufacturers to adopt two-stroke engine technology for motocross racing. During the 1950s, motocross competitors used motorcycles with heavy, pre-war, four-stroke engines, however by the mid 1960s, the heavier four-stroke motorcycles were being rendered obsolete by advances in two-stroke engine technology which made apparent the importance of lightness and agility in motocross racing.

A significant moment in motocross history occurred in 1963 when ČZ factory rider Vlastimil Válek rode a 263cc two-stroke ČZ motorcycle to win the first heat race of the 500cc Czechoslovak Grand Prix. The victory marked a turning point in motocross history, as it was the first win by a two-stroke powered motorcycle in the premier division of the Motocross World Championships. The FIM responded to protests from four-stroke manufacturers by increasing the minimum allowable displacement for two-stroke engines to 350cc. Friedrichs scored his first podium result in 1963 when he rode a ČZ to claim third place at the 250cc East German Grand Prix.

Friedrichs was still a relatively unknown competitor when his second-place finish to the defending World Champion Jeff Smith (BSA) at the 1965 500cc Finnish Grand Prix thrust him into prominence. As the ČZ factory continued to develop and improve their two-stroke technology, Friedrichs won the first overall victory of his career at the 1965 500cc East German Grand Prix where he finished ahead of Vic Eastwood (BSA) and Sten Lundin (Matchless). He ended the season ranked second in the 500cc World Championship behind Smith. Friedrichs travel to international races was heavily restricted by East German government authorities who feared that their highly prized athlete might attempt to defect to western Europe as motorcycle racer Ernst Degner had done in 1961.

Friedrichs claimed his first World Championship in 1966 in a dominant fashion by winning eight of the thirteen rounds. His victory marked the first time that a two-stroke powered motorcycle had won the 500cc World Championship, and was the first by a rider from the Eastern Bloc of a divided Europe. The ČZ team claimed seven of the top ten positions in championship final standings as ČZ became the dominant manufacturer in the Motocross World Championships for the remainder of the 1960s.

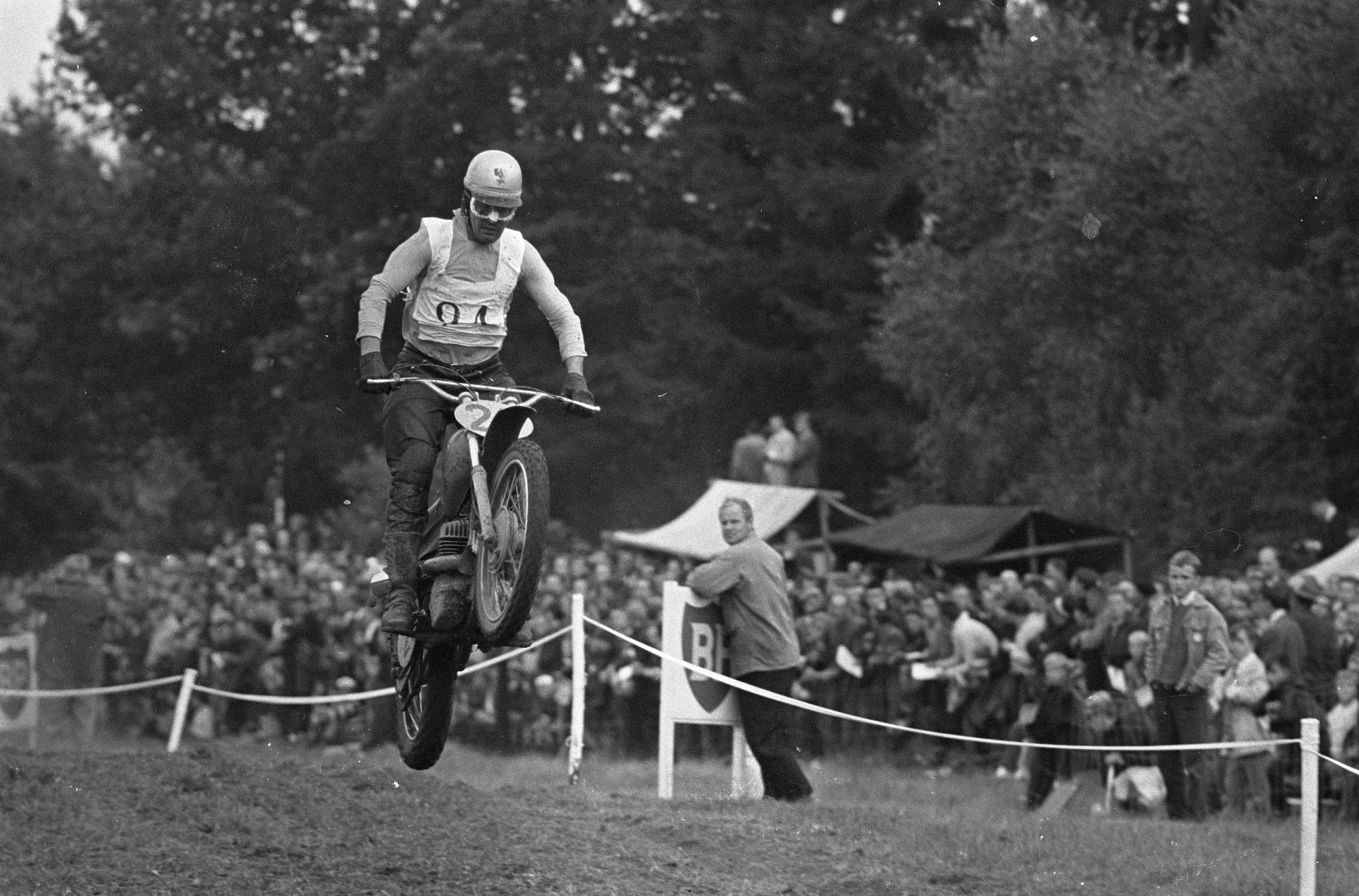
Paul Friedrichs at the 1967 Motocross des Nations

Friedrichs successfully defended his crown in 1967 with another dominating performance with seven victories in eleven rounds to clinch the 500 class World Championship ahead of Smith (BSA). He faced strong opposition in 1968 from BSA factory team rider John Banks and Åke Jonsson riding for the Husqvarna factory racing team. Husqvarna introduced a new 420cc two-stroke motorcycle in 1968 for Jonsson and his teammate Bengt Åberg. By the 1968 season, the BSA factory was the last remaining manufacturer to compete with four-stroke engines in the face of the rapid development of two-stroke engine technology.

Friedrichs failed to score any points in the first three rounds due to mechanical issues before taking his first victory of the year at the 1968 Finnish Grand Prix. The fifth Grand Prix event of the year was held in Friedrichs' homeland of East Germany and, Communist authorities were eager to help an East German rider on a ČZ motorcycle built in a neighboring Communist country in order to demonstrate the inferiority of western capitalism. The East German Grand Prix was not attended by the majority of western European riders due to the difficulty in procuring visas and traveling behind the Iron Curtain. That gave Communist authorities the opportunity to enter several local East German competitors who helped Friedrichs to win the race by continually obstructing Banks' path. Banks placed fourth behind Friedrichs and fellow Eastern Bloc competitors, Vlastimil Valek and Petr Dobry.

Jonsson took the championship points lead by winning the West German Grand Prix but then Banks won the first overall victory of his career at Round 9 with a victory at the French Grand Prix and, followed one week later with a victory at the Dutch Grand Prix while Friedrichs failed to score any points in either event. The setting for Round 11 was a rugged, narrow racetrack in the forests surrounding the picturesque hilltop Citadel of Namur. First held in 1947, the Belgian Grand Prix was revered by motocross enthusiasts in the same manner that auto racing enthusiasts considered the Monaco Grand Prix to be the crown jewel of the Formula One season. Banks would claim the championship points lead with a second place finish in Belgium with Friedrichs in third place while Jonsson encountered mechanical issues.

The championship wasn't decided until the final round in Switzerland, where Banks held a slim points lead over Friedrichs and Jonsson as each competitor had a mathematical chance of winning the title. Friedrichs won the season-ending Swiss Grand Prix to claim the 500cc World Championship by a one-point margin over Banks. Banks actually scored more points overall but fell victim to FIM scoring rules, which only recognize the top seven of thirteen results. The rules would be changed in 1977. Friedrichs won four of the thirteen Grand Prix events to become the first three-time winner of the premier 500cc displacement class since the inception of the Motocross World Championships in 1957. The ČZ team also won the 250cc World Championship in 1968 with rider Joël Robert. Friedrichs was the top individual points scorer at the 1968 Motocross des Nations team event held in Chișinău, Russia, helping the East German team finish second to the Russian team.

=== Later career ===
Friedrichs was caught in the middle of the political tensions of the time when the Warsaw Pact invasion of Czechoslovakia occurred in August 1968 just after the conclusion of the World Championship. Rising Cold War tensions added pressure on Friedrichs as it affected his ability to travel to all rounds of the World Championships.

Friedrichs dropped to third place in the 1969 championship as Bengt Åberg won the title for the Husqvarna team. Åberg successfully defended his title in 1970 as Friedrichs dropped to fourth in the final standings. In 1971, the Suzuki factory won the premier 500cc class in their first attempt with rider Roger De Coster winning five of the 12 Grand Prix events to become the first Japanese manufacturer to win the 500cc World Championship. Friedrichs won the Austrian and Finnish Grand Prix events but finished the season in fourth place for the second consecutive year. Suzuki's victory marked the beginning of Japanese dominance in the Motocross World Championships as smaller European manufacturers such as ČZ and Husqvarna lacked the financial resources to maintain pace with the rapid development of motocross technology. The BSA factory announced that they were ceasing operations in the middle of the 1971 season, leaving Banks unemployed. He would complete the remainder of the season riding as a privateer on a Husqvarna motorcycle.

In the final season of his career, Friedrichs finished second to De Coster in the 1972 500cc world championship with victories in the French and East German Grand Prix races. Second place in the 1972 World Championship would not be decided until the final race of the season in Ettelbruck, Luxembourg where Jonsson (Maico) appeared poised to repeat his second-place result from the previous year. Jonsson won the first heat race and, was leading the second heat race on the last lap when his motorcycle ran out of fuel, dropping him to fourth in the final championship points standings. In the final race of his career, Friedrichs took second place in Luxembourg allowing him to leap from fourth to second place in the championship final points standings. Friedrichs, Heikki Mikkola (Husqvarna) and Jonsson finished the season separated by just three points in the final standings. Friedrichs' victory at the 1972 500cc East German Grand Prix at the age of 32 marked the final win of his motocross racing career.

== Career overview ==
Friedrichs won 61 individual heat races and 29 Grand Prix victories during his world championship racing career. He won three 500cc motocross world titles (1966, 1967, 1968), two 500cc East German motocross national championships (1965, 1972) and four 250cc East German motocross national championships (1962, 1963, 1967, 1972). He was a member of three East German Trophée des Nations teams (1965, 1967, 1971), and three East German Motocross des Nations teams (1966, 1967, 1968). Friedrichs was the top individual points scorer at the 1968 Motocross des Nations event.

Friedrichs also competed in the 1972 International Six Day Trial as a member of the East Germany national team that finished second to the powerful Czechoslovakia national team.

Friedrichs died in Erfurt, Germany on 30 August 2012 at the age of 72.

== Motocross Grand Prix Results ==
Points system from 1952 to 1968:

Position	1st	2nd	3rd	4th	5th	6th
Points	8	6	4	3	2	1

Points system from 1969 to 1980:

Position	1	2	3	4	5	6	7	8	9	10
Points	15	12	10	8	6	5	4	3	2	1

Denotes European motocross championship only.

Year	Class	Machine	1		2		3		4		5		6		7		8		9		10		11		12		13		14		15		Pos	Pts
Year	Class	Machine	R1	R2	R1	R2	R1	R2	R1	R2	R1	R2	R1	R2	R1	R2	R1	R2	R1	R2	R1	R2	R1	R2	R1	R2	R1	R2	R1	R2	R1	R2	Pos	Pts
1961	250cc	ESO	BEL -	BEL -	FRA -	FRA -	NED -	NED -	TCH -	TCH -	POL -	POL -	LUX -	LUX -	FIN -	FIN -	ITA -	ITA -	GER -	GER -	UK -	UK -	CH -	CH -	SWE -	SWE -	GDR; 6	GDR; 6					20th	1
1962	250cc	MZ	ESP -	ESP -	CH -	CH -	BEL -	BEL -	FRA -	FRA -	TCH; 9	TCH; 11	POL -	POL -	NED -	NED -	LUX -	LUX -	FIN -	FIN -	USR -	USR -	GER -	GER -	ITA -	ITA -	UK -	UK -	SWE; 21	SWE -	GDR; 4	GDR -	-	0
1963	250cc	ČZ	ESP -	ESP -	ITA -	ITA -	FRA -	FRA -	CH -	CH -	GER -	GER -	LUX -	LUX -	NED -	NED -	UK -	UK -	SWE; 18	SWE -	FIN -	FIN -	USR -	USR; 3	POL -	POL -	TCH -	TCH -	GDR; 1	GDR; 5			14th	4
1965	250cc	ČZ	ESP -	ESP -	ITA -	ITA -	FRA -	FRA -	BEL -	BEL -	TCH -	TCH -	GER -	GER -	NED -	NED -	LUX -	LUX -	POL -	POL -	USR -	USR -	GDR; 3	GDR; 1	UK -	UK -	SWE -	SWE -	FIN -	FIN -	AUT; 5	AUT -	9th	8
1965	500cc	ČZ	AUT -	AUT -	CH -	CH -	FRA -	FRA -	FIN; 2	FIN; 2	SWE; 5	SWE; 6	GDR; 1	GDR; 1	TCH; 1	TCH; 2	USR -	USR; 4	UK; 7	UK; 9	ITA -	ITA -	GER -	GER -	NED; 2	NED; 4	LUX; 4	LUX; 1					2nd	36
1966	500cc	ČZ	CH; 1	CH; 1	AUT; 2	AUT; 1	ITA; 1	ITA; 1	DEN; 2	DEN; 4	SWE; 5	SWE -	FIN; 3	FIN; 3	GDR; 1	GDR; 1	TCH; 1	TCH; 1	USR; 1	USR; 1	UK -	UK -	NED -	NED -	BEL; 11	BEL; 3	LUX; 1	LUX; 2	GER -	GER -			1st	62
1967	500cc	ČZ	AUT -	AUT -	ITA; 2	ITA; 2	SWE; 4	SWE; 6	TCH; 1	TCH; 1	USR -	USR -	FRA; 1	FRA; 2	GER; 1	GER; 1	UK; 1	UK; 2	BEL; 2	BEL; 1	LUX -	LUX; 1	CH; 1	CH; 1									1st	56
1968	500cc	ČZ	AUT; 1	AUT; 18	ITA -	ITA -	SWE -	SWE; 1	FIN; 1	FIN; 2	GDR; 1	GDR; 1	TCH; 1	TCH; 1	UK -	UK -	GER; 1	GER -	FRA -	FRA -	NED -	NED -	BEL; 8	BEL; 1	LUX; 1	LUX; 3	CH; 2	CH; 2					1st	42
1969	500cc	ČZ	AUT; 39	AUT; 1	SWE; 7	SWE -	NED -	NED -	ITA -	ITA -	TCH; 1	TCH -	USR; 2	USR; 1	GER; 1	GER; 5	BEL; 5	BEL; 6	LUX; 5	LUX; 1	FRA; 2	FRA; 1	CH; 4	CH; 4	GDR; 1	GDR -							3rd	67
1970	250cc	ČZ	ESP -	ESP -	FRA -	FRA -	BEL -	BEL -	YUG -	YUG -	ITA -	ITA -	USR -	USR -	POL -	POL -	UK -	UK -	FIN -	FIN -	GDR -	GDR -	CH -	CH -	AUT; 4	AUT -							-	0
1970	500cc	ČZ	CH; 9	CH; 1	AUT; 6	AUT; 1	NED -	NED; 28	FRA -	FRA -	FIN -	FIN -	SWE; 3	SWE; 3	TCH; 3	TCH -	USR; 1	USR; 1	GER; 6	GER; 6	GDR; 8	GDR; 1	BEL -	BEL -	LUX -	LUX; 1							4th	60
1971	500cc	ČZ	ITA; 4	ITA -	AUT; 1	AUT; 1	SWE; 2	SWE; 3	FIN; 1	FIN; 2	TCH -	TCH -	USR -	USR -	GDR; 6	GDR; 6	UK; 4	UK; 1	GER -	GER -	BEL -	BEL -	LUX; 6	LUX; 3	NED -	NED -							4th	70
1972	500cc	ČZ	AUT -	AUT -	CH; 5	CH -	SWE -	SWE -	FRA; 1	FRA; 1	USR; 8	USR; 1	TCH -	TCH -	UK; 7	UK -	GER; 2	GER; 5	GDR; 2	GDR; 1	BEL; 6	BEL -	LUX; 6	LUX; 3									2nd	62
