= 1967 FIM Motocross World Championship =

Motocross championship season

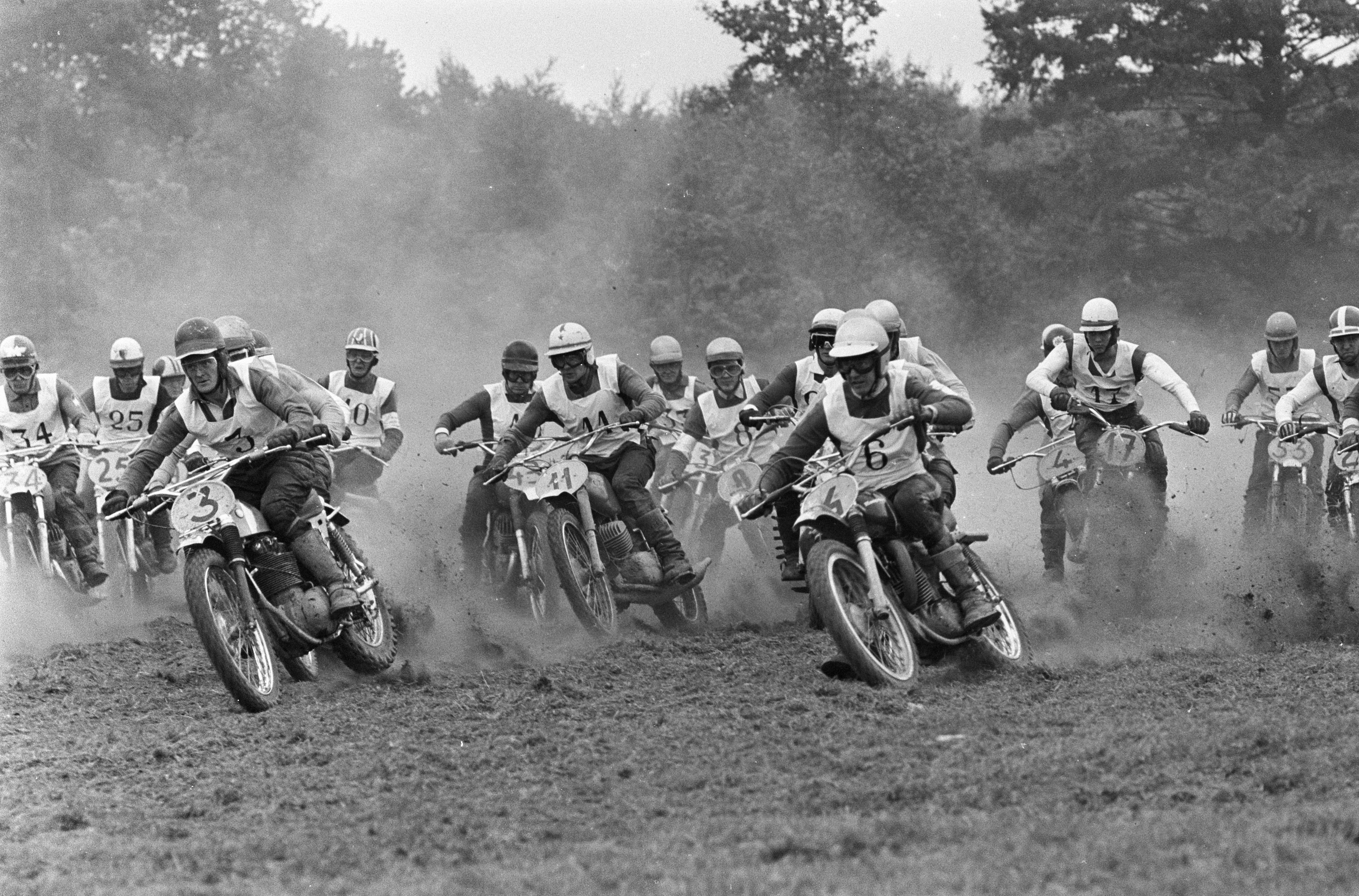
- The start of the 1967 Motocross des Nations race in Markelo, Holland
- Organizer: FIM
- Duration: 2 April/20 August
- Number of races: 26
- Number of manufacturers: 9

Champions
- 500cc: (East Germany) Paul Friedrichs
- 250cc: (Sweden) Torsten Hallman

FIM Motocross World Championship
- ← 1966 1968 →

The 1967 Motocross World Championship was the 11th edition of the Motocross World Championship organized by the FIM and reserved for 500cc and 250cc motorcycles.

== Summary ==
In the 500cc displacement class, ČZ factory-supported rider Paul Friedrichs repeated his dominant performance of the previous season, easily defending his crown by winning seven out of eleven Grand Prix events. BSA factory team rider and two-time World Champion Jeff Smith finished the season as vice-champion.

Two-time World Champion Bill Nilsson (1957, 1960) made his final World Championship appearance at the 1967 500cc British Grand Prix. Another two-time World Champion, Rolf Tibblin (1962, 1963), also ended his World Championship career with a final appearance at the 1967 500cc Luxembourg Grand Prix.

As with the previous year, Torsten Hallman and Joël Robert traded victories throughout the season. After eight of twelve rounds, Robert had won four Grand Prix races to Hallman's three; however, Robert failed to finish in three of the final four rounds, allowing Hallman to overtake him with a victory at the penultimate round in Russia and claim his fourth world championship by a slim two-point margin. The two rivals dominated the championship with five Grand Prix victories apiece.

== Grands Prix ==
=== 500cc ===
Round	Date	Grand Prix	Location	Race 1 Winner	Race 2 Winner	Overall Winner	Report
1	April 16	(Austria) Austrian Grand Prix	Sittendorf	(Soviet Union) Gunnar Draugs	(Soviet Union) Gunnar Draugs	(Soviet Union) Gunnar Draugs	Report
2	May 7	(Italy) Italian Grand Prix	Esanatoglia	(Soviet Union) Gunnar Draugs	(United Kingdom) Vic Eastwood	(East Germany) Paul Friedrichs	Report
3	May 15	(Sweden) Swedish Grand Prix	Hedemora	(Sweden) Christer Hammargren	(United Kingdom) Jeff Smith	(United Kingdom) Dave Bickers	Report
4	June 18	(Czechoslovakia) Czechoslovak Grand Prix	Sedlčany	(East Germany) Paul Friedrichs	(East Germany) Paul Friedrichs	(East Germany) Paul Friedrichs	Report
5	June 25	(Soviet Union) Russian Grand Prix	Chișinău	(Soviet Union) Vladimir Pogrebnyak	(United Kingdom) Jeff Smith	(United Kingdom) Jeff Smith	Report
6	July 9	(France) French Grand Prix	Niort	(East Germany) Paul Friedrichs	(Czechoslovakia) Vlastimil Válek	(East Germany) Paul Friedrichs	Report
7	July 16	(West Germany) West German Grand Prix	Beuren	(East Germany) Paul Friedrichs	(East Germany) Paul Friedrichs	(East Germany) Paul Friedrichs	Report
8	July 30	(United Kingdom) British Grand Prix	Farleigh Castle	(East Germany) Paul Friedrichs	(United Kingdom) Dave Bickers	(East Germany) Paul Friedrichs	Report
9	August 6	(Belgium) Belgian Grand Prix	Namur	(Belgium) Jeff Teeuwissen	(East Germany) Paul Friedrichs	(East Germany) Paul Friedrichs	Report
10	August 13	Luxembourg Grand Prix	Ettelbruck	(United Kingdom) Vic Eastwood	(East Germany) Paul Friedrichs	(United Kingdom) Dave Bickers	Report
11	August 20	(Switzerland) Swiss Grand Prix	Wohlen	(East Germany) Paul Friedrichs	(East Germany) Paul Friedrichs	(East Germany) Paul Friedrichs	Report

=== 250cc ===
Round	Date	Grand Prix	Location	Race 1 Winner	Race 2 Winner	Overall Winner	Report
1	April 2	(Spain) Spanish Grand Prix	Sabadell	(Soviet Union) Victor Arbekov	(Soviet Union) Victor Arbekov	(Soviet Union) Victor Arbekov	Report
2	April 9	(Switzerland) Swiss Grand Prix	Payerne	(Sweden) Torsten Hallman	(Belgium) Joël Robert	(Sweden) Torsten Hallman	Report
3	April 16	(France) French Grand Prix	Vannes	(Belgium) Joël Robert	(Belgium) Joël Robert	(Belgium) Joël Robert	Report
4	April 23	(Belgium) Belgian Grand Prix	Hechtel	(Belgium) Joël Robert	(Belgium) Joël Robert	(Belgium) Joël Robert	Report
5	May 14	(West Germany) West German Grand Prix	Bielstein	(Soviet Union) Victor Arbekov	(Sweden) Torsten Hallman	(Sweden) Torsten Hallman	Report
6	May 21	(Netherlands) Dutch Grand Prix	Norg	(Sweden) Torsten Hallman	(Belgium) Joël Robert	(Belgium) Joël Robert	Report
7	June 11	(Italy) Italian Grand Prix	Bra	(Belgium) Joël Robert	(Sweden) Torsten Hallman	(Sweden) Torsten Hallman	Report
8	July 9	(United Kingdom) British Grand Prix	Halstead	(Belgium) Joël Robert	(Belgium) Joël Robert	(Belgium) Joël Robert	Report
9	July 23	(Sweden) Swedish Grand Prix	Motala	(Sweden) Torsten Hallman	(Sweden) Torsten Hallman	(Sweden) Torsten Hallman	Report
10	July 30	(Finland) Finnish Grand Prix	Hyvinkää	(Sweden) Torsten Hallman	(Sweden) Olle Pettersson	(Sweden) Olle Pettersson	Report
11	August 6	(Soviet Union) Russian Grand Prix	Belgorod	(Sweden) Torsten Hallman	(Sweden) Torsten Hallman	(Sweden) Torsten Hallman	Report
12	August 13	(Poland) Polish Grand Prix	Szczecin	(Belgium) Joël Robert	(Belgium) Joël Robert	(Belgium) Joël Robert	Report

== Final standings ==
Points are awarded to the top 6 classified finishers. For the 500cc final championship standings, the 7 best of 11 results are retained. For the 250cc final championship standings, the 7 best of 12 results are retained.

Position	1st	2nd	3rd	4th	5th	6th
Points	8	6	4	3	2	1

=== 500cc ===
(Results in italics indicate overall winner)

Pos	Rider	Machine	AUT (Austria)		ITA (Italy)		SWE (Sweden)		TCH (Czechoslovakia)		USSR (Soviet Union)		FRA (France)		GER (West Germany)		UK (United Kingdom)		BEL (Belgium)		LUX (Luxembourg)		CH (Switzerland)		Points
Pos	Rider	Machine	R1	R2	R1	R2	R1	R2	R1	R2	R1	R2	R1	R2	R1	R2	R1	R2	R1	R2	R1	R2	R1	R2	
1	(East Germany) Paul Friedrichs	ČZ	-	-	2	2	4	6	1	1	-	-	1	2	1	1	1	2	2	1	-	1	1	1	56
2	(United Kingdom) Jeff Smith	BSA	3	24	-	-	5	1	3	2	2	1	6	3	3	4	4	3	5	3	8	-	16	6	35
3	(United Kingdom) Dave Bickers	ČZ	9	6	4	5	2	2	-	-	-	-	-	-	-	-	6	1	16	2	2	3	3	-	26
4	(Czechoslovakia) Vlastimil Válek	Jawa	8	10	5	4	-	3	4	-	3	3	2	1	4	7	5	4	6	5	3	-	5	2	26
5	(Belgium) Roger De Coster	ČZ	10	11	-	10	-	-	2	5	-	-	9	-	8	8	8	-	3	4	9	2	2	5	19
6	(Soviet Union) Gunnar Draugs	ČZ	1	1	1	3	3	-	-	-	-	-	4	4	-	-	-	-	15	6	14	9	-	-	16
7	(Sweden) Christer Hammargren	Husqvarna	-	-	-	-	1	4	-	-	-	-	-	-	-	-	-	-	-	-	5	4	-	-	12
8	(Soviet Union) Vladimir Pogrebniak	ČZ	6	5	-	-	-	-	-	4	1	2	14	7	7	15	-	-	-	-	13	10	6	9	10
9	(Sweden) Bill Nilsson	Husqvarna	2	2	-	-	-	-	-	-	-	-	-	-	10	5	7	5	-	-	-	-	-	-	9
10	(United Kingdom) Vic Eastwood	BSA	-	13	3	1	-	-	6	-	-	-	13	-	12	2	2	-	11	8	1	-	-	4	8
11	(Sweden) Jan Johansson	Lindstrom	4	4	-	-	-	-	-	-	-	-	-	5	2	-	16	13	-	-	12	8	4	7	7
12	(United Kingdom) John Banks	BSA	-	15	-	-	-	-	-	-	-	-	-	-	-	-	-	-	9	-	4	6	10	3	6
13	(Soviet Union) Yuri Matveev	ČZ	11	12	-	-	-	-	5	3	5	4	-	-	-	-	-	-	-	-	-	-	-	-	6
14	(United Kingdom) Keith Hickman	BSA	5	3	-	-	-	-	-	-	-	-	5	-	-	-	9	-	-	-	6	-	9	-	6
15	(Sweden) Bengt Åberg	Husqvarna	12	7	-	-	-	-	-	-	4	6	3	-	-	-	-	-	-	-	-	-	-	-	4
15	(Sweden) Rolf Tibblin	ČZ	-	-	-	-	8	5	-	-	-	-	-	-	-	-	-	-	-	-	7	5	-	-	4
17	(West Germany) Wolfgang Müller	Maico	-	-	-	-	-	-	-	-	-	-	-	-	6	6	-	-	-	-	-	-	-	-	3
18	(Czechoslovakia) Jiří Schmalz	ČZ	21	16	-	-	-	-	-	-	-	-	10	6	-	-	12	-	13	-	16	12	8	-	2
18	(Sweden) Åke Jonsson	Husqvarna	-	-	-	-	7	9	-	-	8	-	-	-	-	-	-	-	8	7	-	-	-	-	2
20	(Italy) Emilio Ostorero	ČZ	-	-	-	6	-	-	-	-	-	-	-	-	-	-	-	-	-	-	-	-	-	-	1
20	(Sweden) Gunnar Johansson	ČZ	-	-	-	-	6	8	-	-	-	-	-	-	-	-	-	-	-	-	-	-	-	-	1
20	(United Kingdom) Arthur Lampkin	BSA	-	-	-	-	-	-	-	-	-	-	-	-	-	-	15	6	-	-	-	-	-	-	1
20	(Netherlands) Pierre Karsmakers	ČZ	-	-	-	-	-	-	-	6	-	-	-	-	-	-	-	-	4	14	-	13	-	-	1
20	(East Germany) Heinz Hoppe	ČZ	14	8	-	-	-	-	-	-	-	-	11	11	-	-	-	-	10	-	11	7	13	8	1
-	(Belgium) Jeff Teuwissen	ČZ	-	-	-	-	-	-	-	-	-	-	-	-	-	-	-	-	1	-	-	-	-	-	0
-	(Czechoslovakia) Miroslav Lisý	ČZ	7	9	6	-	-	-	-	-	-	-	16	9	5	12	14	7	12	11	-	-	-	-	0
-	(West Germany) Adolf Weil	Maico	-	-	-	-	-	-	-	-	-	-	-	-	-	3	-	-	-	-	-	-	-	-	0
-	(United Kingdom) Don Rickman	Triumph-Métisse	-	-	-	-	-	-	-	-	-	-	-	-	-	-	3	-	-	-	-	-	-	-	0

=== 250cc ===
(Results in italics indicate overall winner)

Pos	Rider	Machine	ESP (Spain)		CH (Switzerland)		FRA (France)		BEL (Belgium)		GER (West Germany)		NED (Netherlands)		ITA (Italy)		UK (United Kingdom)		SWE (Sweden)		FIN (Finland)		USSR (Soviet Union)		POL (Poland)		Pts
Pos	Rider	Machine	R1	R2	R1	R2	R1	R2	R1	R2	R1	R2	R1	R2	R1	R2	R1	R2	R1	R2	R1	R2	R1	R2	R1	R2	
1	(Sweden) Torsten Hallman	Husqvarna	-	2	1	2	2	2	3	3	2	1	1	-	2	1	-	3	1	1	1	2	1	1	-	-	52
2	(Belgium) Joël Robert	ČZ	10	3	3	1	1	1	1	1	11	-	2	1	1	6	1	1	-	-	-	-	2	-	1	1	50
3	(Sweden) Olle Pettersson	Husqvarna	3	4	12	7	4	6	4	5	4	2	6	5	3	3	4	2	2	2	2	1	5	2	2	2	44
4	(Soviet Union) Victor Arbekov	ČZ	1	1	4	8	5	4	13	-	1	-	3	2	-	-	2	4	-	-	-	-	3	-	-	-	25
5	(Finland) Jyrki Storm	ČZ	-	-	-	-	-	-	5	2	9	5	5	4	6	5	6	9	-	-	4	5	-	-	3	4	20
6	(Sweden) Håkan Andersson	Husqvarna	-	-	-	-	-	-	-	-	-	-	-	-	-	-	5	5	3	3	3	3	6	-	-	-	13
7	(Soviet Union) Leonid Shinkarenko	ČZ	2	6	8	16	3	3	7	6	-	-	7	3	-	-	-	-	-	-	-	-	4	-	-	-	10
8	(Czechoslovakia) Zdeněk Strnad	ČZ	-	-	-	-	8	9	11	-	7	3	-	-	9	4	15	6	-	-	-	-	-	-	-	-	5
9	(East Germany) Paul Friedrichs	ČZ	-	-	2	4	-	-	-	-	-	-	-	-	-	-	-	-	-	-	-	-	-	-	-	-	4
10	(Soviet Union) Gennady Moiseyev	ČZ	-	-	-	-	-	-	-	-	-	-	-	-	-	-	-	-	-	-	-	-	8	3	-	-	4
11	(Belgium) Jacky Wiertz	Bultaco	4	5	7	19	-	-	22	-	-	-	-	-	4	7	-	-	-	-	-	-	-	-	-	-	4
12	(United Kingdom) Allan Clough	Husqvarna	-	-	6	3	-	-	-	7	-	-	-	-	-	-	7	-	-	-	-	-	-	-	-	-	3
12	(Soviet Union) Alex Yakovlev	ČZ	-	-	-	-	-	-	-	-	5	8	-	-	-	-	-	-	-	-	-	-	-	-	-	-	3
12	(Netherlands) Frans Sigmans	Husqvarna	-	-	-	-	-	-	-	-	-	-	4	6	-	-	-	-	-	-	-	-	-	-	-	-	3
12	(Italy) Emilio Ostorero	ČZ	-	-	-	-	-	-	-	-	-	-	-	-	5	2	-	-	-	-	-	-	-	-	-	-	3
12	(Sweden) Arne Kring	Husqvarna	-	-	-	-	-	-	-	-	-	-	-	-	-	-	-	-	5	5	-	-	-	-	-	-	3
12	(Czechoslovakia) Vlastimil Hlous	ČZ	-	-	-	-	-	-	-	-	-	-	-	-	-	-	10	-	-	-	-	-	7	4	6	-	3
12	(Czechoslovakia) Karel Konečný	ČZ	-	-	10	6	-	-	20	11	6	10	-	-	-	-	-	-	-	-	-	-	-	-	4	5	3
19	(Belgium) Roger De Coster	ČZ	-	-	-	-	-	-	6	4	-	-	-	-	-	-	-	-	-	-	-	-	-	-	-	-	2
19	(France) Jacky Porte	Montesa	12	-	-	-	30	5	26	18	10	4	-	-	-	-	-	-	-	-	-	-	-	-	-	-	2
19	(Sweden) Rolf Martensson	ČZ	-	-	-	-	-	-	-	-	-	-	-	-	-	-	-	-	4	-	-	-	-	-	-	-	2
19	(Sweden) Staffan Eneqvist	Husqvarna	-	-	-	-	-	-	-	-	8	-	18	8	-	-	13	-	-	-	6	4	-	-	-	-	2
19	(Czechoslovakia) Ivan Poláš	ČZ	-	-	14	10	-	-	12	8	-	-	-	-	-	-	9	8	-	-	-	-	-	-	5	3	2
24	(Belgium) Marcel Wiertz	Bultaco	6	8	5	9	-	-	21	-	12	-	-	-	-	-	-	-	-	-	-	-	-	-	-	-	2
25	(United Kingdom) Bryan Goss	Husqvarna	-	-	9	15	6	8	-	-	-	7	-	-	-	-	-	-	-	-	-	-	-	-	-	-	1
25	(Belgium) Jeff Teuwissen	ČZ	-	-	-	-	-	-	2	10	-	-	-	-	-	-	-	-	-	-	-	-	-	-	-	-	1
25	(United Kingdom) Andy Roberton	Cotton	-	-	-	-	-	-	-	-	-	-	-	-	-	-	8	7	-	-	-	-	-	-	-	-	1
25	(Finland) Heikki Mikkola	Husqvarna	-	-	-	-	-	-	-	-	-	-	-	-	-	-	-	-	-	-	-	6	-	-	-	-	1
25	(Soviet Union) Boris Ivanov	ČZ	-	-	-	-	-	-	-	-	-	-	-	-	-	-	-	-	-	-	-	-	-	6	-	-	1
25	(East Germany) Fred Willamowski	ČZ	-	-	-	-	-	-	-	-	-	-	8	10	-	-	-	-	-	-	-	-	-	-	7	-	1
-	(West Germany) Adolf Weil	Maico	5	19	-	5	11	29	10	14	3	-	-	-	-	-	-	-	-	-	-	-	-	-	-	-	0
-	(Finland) Kalevi Vehkonen	Husqvarna	-	-	-	-	-	-	-	-	-	-	-	-	-	-	-	-	-	-	5	-	-	-	-	-	0
