= 1964 FIM Motocross World Championship =

Motocross championship season

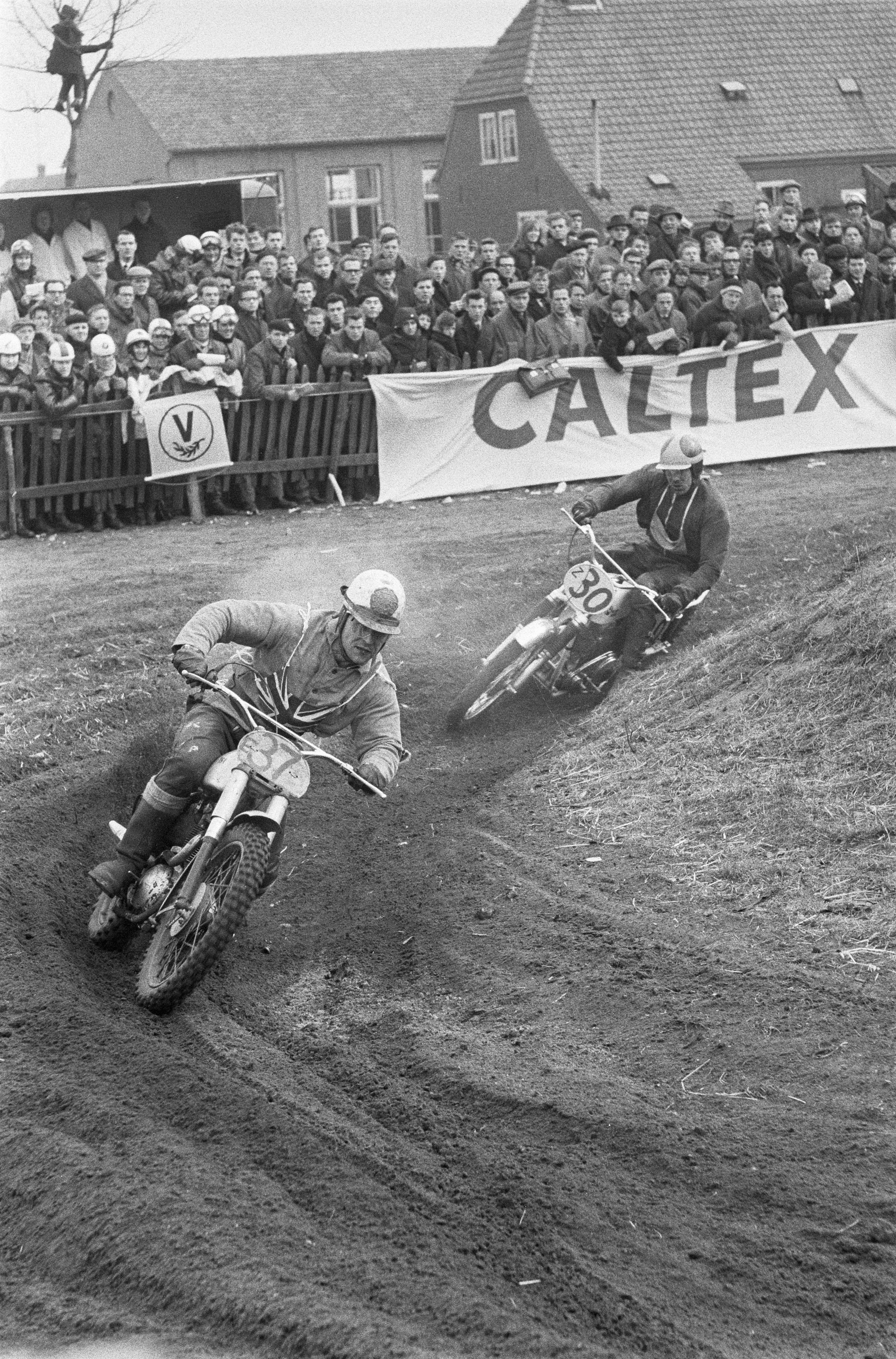
- Jeff Smith leads Rolf Tibblin at the Motocross der Azen pre-season invitational race on 15 March 1964 in Sint Anthonis, Holland.
- Organizer: FIM
- Duration: 5 April/13 September
- Number of races: 28
- Number of manufacturers: 13

Champions
- 500cc: (United Kingdom) Jeff Smith
- 250cc: (Belgium) Joël Robert

Motocross World Championship
- ← 1963 1965 →

The 1964 Motocross World Championship was the 8th edition of the Motocross World Championship organized by the FIM and reserved for 500cc and 250cc motorcycles.

== Summary ==
Jeff Smith, riding for the BSA factory racing team won the 500cc motocross world championship to become the first British rider to claim the premier division, beating out former two-time world champions Rolf Tibblin and Sten Lundin. The Husqvarna factory stopped producing their four-stroke motorcycles in 1963, leaving Tibblin without a motorcycle for the 1964 season. He teamed up with engine tuner Nisse Hedlund to build their own complete motocross machine in time for the 1964 season. Tibblin began the season strongly, winning five of the first six races; however, Smith consistently scored points throughout the season, and the championship wasn't decided until the final race of the season in Spain, where Smith took the victory to claim the World Championship by only two points over Tibblin.

In the 250cc division, Husqvarna factory rider Torsten Hallman was favored to repeat after his dominant performance in the 1963 championship. The return of Greeves factory rider Dave Bickers after a two-year absence should have made him Hallman's biggest challenger; however, he was upset by the unexpected arrival of 20-year-old privateer Joël Robert, riding a ČZ motorcycle. After Hallman won the season-opening Spanish Grand Prix, Robert reeled off a string of four consecutive victories to take the championship points lead. Bickers was able to relegate Robert to second place at the Luxembourg Grand Prix; however, his Greeves proved to be too fragile and underpowered to pose a serious challenge. Hallman was able to recover with a victory at the Italian Grand Prix, but then Robert won another four Grand Prix races in succession to clinch the World Championship. The 20-year-old Robert became the youngest motocross world champion at the time. Victor Arbekov became the first Russian competitor to win a Grand Prix overall on 2 August at the East German Grand Prix.

== Grands Prix ==
=== 500cc ===
Round	Date	Grand Prix	Location	Race 1 Winner	Race 2 Winner	Overall Winner	Report
1	April 12	(Switzerland) Swiss Grand Prix	Payerne	(Sweden) Rolf Tibblin	(United Kingdom) Jeff Smith	(Sweden) Rolf Tibblin	Report
2	April 26	(Austria) Austrian Grand Prix	Sittendorf	(Sweden) Rolf Tibblin	(Sweden) Rolf Tibblin	(Sweden) Rolf Tibblin	Report
3	May 10	(Denmark) Danish Grand Prix	Volk Mølle	(Sweden) Rolf Tibblin	(United Kingdom) Jeff Smith	(Sweden) Rolf Tibblin	Report
4	May 17	(Sweden) Swedish Grand Prix	Vimmerby	(Sweden) Rolf Tibblin	(Sweden) Rolf Tibblin	(Sweden) Rolf Tibblin	Report
5	May 24	(Netherlands) Dutch Grand Prix	Norg	(United Kingdom) Jeff Smith	(United Kingdom) Jeff Smith	(United Kingdom) Jeff Smith	Report
6	May 31	(France) French Grand Prix	Sucé-sur-Erdre	(Sweden) Rolf Tibblin	(Sweden) Rolf Tibblin	(Sweden) Rolf Tibblin	Report
7	June 7	(Italy) Italian Grand Prix	Avigliana	(United Kingdom) Jeff Smith	(Sweden) Rolf Tibblin	(United Kingdom) Jeff Smith	Report
8	June 21	(Soviet Union) Russian Grand Prix	Lviv	(United Kingdom) Jeff Smith	(Sweden) Ove Lundell	(United Kingdom) Jeff Smith	Report
9	June 28	(Czechoslovakia) Czechoslovak Grand Prix	Přerov	(Sweden) Rolf Tibblin	(Sweden) Rolf Tibblin	(Sweden) Rolf Tibblin	Report
10	August 2	(Belgium) Belgian Grand Prix	Namur	(United Kingdom) Jeff Smith	(Sweden) Sten Lundin	(United Kingdom) Jeff Smith	Report
11	August 9	Luxembourg Grand Prix	Ettelbruck	(United Kingdom) Jeff Smith	(United Kingdom) Jeff Smith	(United Kingdom) Jeff Smith	Report
12	August 16	(West Germany) West German Grand Prix	Bielstein	(Sweden) Sten Lundin	(Sweden) Sten Lundin	(Sweden) Sten Lundin	Report
13	August 30	(East Germany) East German Grand Prix	Schwerin	(United Kingdom) Jeff Smith	(Sweden) Rolf Tibblin	(United Kingdom) Jeff Smith	Report
14	September 13	(Spain) Spanish Grand Prix	San Sebastián	(United Kingdom) Jeff Smith	(Sweden) Rolf Tibblin	(United Kingdom) Jeff Smith	Report

=== 250cc ===
Round	Date	Grand Prix	Location	Race 1 Winner	Race 2 Winner	Overall Winner	Report
1	April 5	(Spain) Spanish Grand Prix	Ruta	(Sweden) Torsten Hallman	(Sweden) Torsten Hallman	(Sweden) Torsten Hallman	Report
2	April 26	(Belgium) Belgian Grand Prix	Woluwe-Saint-Lambert	(Belgium) Joël Robert	(Belgium) Joël Robert	(Belgium) Joël Robert	Report
3	May 3	(Switzerland) Swiss Grand Prix	Wohlen	(Belgium) Joël Robert	(Belgium) Joël Robert	(Belgium) Joël Robert	Report
4	May 10	(Czechoslovakia) Czechoslovak Grand Prix	Holice	(Belgium) Joël Robert	(Belgium) Joël Robert	(Belgium) Joël Robert	Report
5	May 17	(West Germany) West German Grand Prix	Erlangen	(Belgium) Joël Robert	(United Kingdom) Dave Bickers	(Belgium) Joël Robert	Report
6	May 24	Luxembourg Grand Prix	Schifflange	(United Kingdom) Dave Bickers	(United Kingdom) Dave Bickers	(United Kingdom) Dave Bickers	Report
7	May 31	(Italy) Italian Grand Prix	Imola	(United Kingdom) Dave Bickers	(Sweden) Torsten Hallman	(Sweden) Torsten Hallman	Report
8	June 28	(United Kingdom) British Grand Prix	Cadwell Park	(United Kingdom) Dave Bickers	(Belgium) Joël Robert	(Belgium) Joël Robert	Report
9	July 5	(Sweden) Swedish Grand Prix	Hedemora	(Belgium) Joël Robert	(United Kingdom) Dave Bickers	(Belgium) Joël Robert	Report
10	July 12	(Finland) Finnish Grand Prix	Tikkurila	(Belgium) Joël Robert	(Belgium) Joël Robert	(Belgium) Joël Robert	Report
11	July 19	(Soviet Union) Russian Grand Prix	Leningrad	(Belgium) Joël Robert	(Soviet Union) Victor Arbekov	(Belgium) Joël Robert	Report
12	July 26	(Poland) Polish Grand Prix	Kielce	(Soviet Union) Victor Arbekov	(Sweden) Torsten Hallman	(Sweden) Torsten Hallman	Report
13	August 2	(East Germany) East German Grand Prix	Apolda	(Belgium) Joël Robert	(Czechoslovakia) Vlastimil Válek	(Soviet Union) Victor Arbekov	Report
14	August 15	(France) French Grand Prix	Laguépie	(Sweden) Åke Jonsson	(Sweden) Torsten Hallman	(Sweden) Torsten Hallman	Report

== Final standings ==
Points are awarded to the top 6 classified finishers. For the final championship standings, half of the competitors' results are retained. Thus with 14 Grand Prix, the 7 best results are retained.

Position	1st	2nd	3rd	4th	5th	6th
Points	8	6	4	3	2	1

=== 500cc ===
(Results in italics indicate overall winner)

Pos	Rider	Machine	CH (Switzerland)		AUT (Austria)		DEN (Denmark)		SWE (Sweden)		NED (Netherlands)		FRA (France)		ITA (Italy)		USSR (Soviet Union)		TCH (Czechoslovakia)		BEL (Belgium)		LUX (Luxembourg)		GER (West Germany)		GDR (East Germany)		ESP (Spain)		Pts
Pos	Rider	Machine	R1	R2	R1	R2	R1	R2	R1	R2	R1	R2	R1	R2	R1	R2	R1	R2	R1	R2	R1	R2	R1	R2	R1	R2	R1	R2	R1	R2	Pts
1	(United Kingdom) Jeff Smith	BSA	2	1	2	2	2	1	3	2	1	1	5	2	1	2	1	3	2	3	1	2	1	1	2	3	2	1	1	2	56
2	(Sweden) Rolf Tibblin	Hedlund	1	2	1	1	1	2	1	1	3	2	1	1	-	1	-	2	1	1	9	-	-	-	5	2	1	2	-	1	54
3	(Sweden) Sten Lundin	Lito	3	3	3	3	3	3	2	3	4	5	2	3	7	3	4	-	-	-	5	1	-	-	1	1	-	-	2	6	34
4	(Sweden) Ove Lundell	Husqvarna	6	7	6	-	-	-	-	5	2	4	7	4	-	10	7	1	3	4	-	-	10	3	4	4	3	-	5	4	22
5	(Sweden) Bill Nilsson	Métisse-ESO	-	-	-	-	-	-	7	6	5	3		-	4	6	-	-	4	2	6	-	2	4	6	5	-	-	-	-	20
6	(Sweden) Per Olaf Persson	Husqvarna	-	10	5	5	-	-	6	7	7	6	4	5	2	5	-	-	-	-	10	-	3	-	3	6	-	-	-	-	16
7	(Belgium) Herman De Soete	Métisse-Matchless	-	-	-	-	-	-	-	-	-	-	-	-	-	9	-	-	-	-	8	6	7	2	-	-	-	-	3	-	9
8	(United Kingdom) Jerry Scott	BSA	-	-	-	6	-	-	-	-	-	-	-	-	-	-	-	-	-	-	-	-	4	7	-	-	4	7	-	-	6
8	(United Kingdom) Vic Eastwood	Matchless	10	-	4	4	4	-	4	-	-	7	-	-	8	4	-	-	5	5	3	-	-	6	-	-	-	-	-	-	6
8	(Belgium) Hubert Scaillet	Triumph-Métisse	-	-	-	-	-	-	-	-	-	-	3	21	-	-	-	-	-	-	19	4	-	-	-	-	-	-	4	3	6
8	(United Kingdom) John Burton	Triumph-Métisse	-	-	-	-	-	-	-	-	-	-	-	-	9	12	-	-	-	-	2	3	5	18	-	-	-	-	9	-	6
12	(Switzerland) Pierre-André Rapin	Monark	4	4	-	-	-	-	-	-	-	-	9	10	-	-	-	-	7	8	27	-	8	5	-	-	-	-	-	-	5
13	(Czechoslovakia) Josef Chára	Jawa	-	-	-	-	-	-	-	-	-	-	-	-	-	-	3	5	-	-	-	-	-	-	-	-	-	-	-	-	4
13	(East Germany) Dieter Kley	ESO	-	-	-	-	-	-	-	-	-	-	-	-	-	-	-	-	-	-	-	-	-	-	-	-	5	3	-	-	4
13	(Sweden) Gunnar Johansson	Lito	-	-	-	-	-	-	5	4	-	-	8	6	5	7	-	-	-	-	-	-	-	-	-	-	-	-	-	-	4
16	(Soviet Union) Nikolaj Sokolov	ESO	-	-	-	-	-	-	-	-	-	-	-	-	-	-	2	7	-	-	-	-	-	-	-	-	-	-	-	-	3
16	(Belgium) Jos Ribbens	BSA	-	-	-	-	6	5	-	-	10	-	-	-	-	-	-	-	-	-	20	16	13	20	-	-	-	-	-	-	3
18	(Soviet Union) Antonin Klavinsh	ESO	-	-	-	-	-	-	-	-	-	-	-	-	-	-	6	4	-	-	-	-	-	-	-	-	-	-	-	-	2
18	(Soviet Union) Aleksandr Lebedev	ESO	-	-	-	-	-	-	-	-	-	-	-	-	-	-	-	-	-	-	-	-	-	-	-	-	8	4	-	-	2
18	(France) André Chuchard	Triumph-Métisse	-	-	-	-	-	-	-	-	-	-	6	8	-	-	-	-	-	-	7	9	-	-	-	-	-	-	-	-	2
18	(Netherlands) Broer Dirkx	Lito	-	-	-	-	-	4	-	-	6	-	-	-	3	8	-	-	-	-	-	-	-	-	-	-	-	-	-	-	2
18	(United Kingdom) Dave Nicoll	Matchless	-	-	-	-	7	6	-	-	-	-	-	-	-	-	-	-	-	-	-	-	6	8	-	-	-	-	-	-	2
18	(Czechoslovakia) Ervín Krajčovič	ESO	5	6	-	-	-	-	-	-	-	-	-	-	14	-	-	-	8	7	-	-	22	9	-	-	6	-	-	-	2
24	(Czechoslovakia) Josef Hřebeček	ČZ	8	-	-	-	-	-	-	-	-	-	12	14	15	11	-	-	6	6	-	-	-	-	-	-	9	5	-	-	1
24	(Czechoslovakia) Lubomír Eichler	ČZ	-	-	-	-	-	-	-	-	-	-	-	-	-	-	5	6	-	-	-	-	-	-	-	-	10	10	-	-	1
24	(United Kingdom) Andy Lee	Matchless-Métisse	-	-	-	-	-	-	-	-	14	-	11	7	-	-	-	-	-	-	-	-	-	-	-	-	-	-	7	-	1
24	(Soviet Union) Sigur Kalkis	ESO	-	-	-	-	-	-	-	-	-	-	-	-	-	-	-	-	-	-	-	-	-	-	-	-	7	6	-	-	1
24	(Belgium) Roger Vanderbecken	Triumph	-	-	-	-	-	-	-	-	-	-	13	9	-	-	-	-	-	-	12	7	9	21	-	-	-	-	-	-	1
24	(Denmark) Jacob Lynegaard	BSA	-	-	-	-	-	-	-	-	-	-	-	-	-	-	-	-	-	-	-	-	-	-	-	-	-	-	-	-	1
-	(Belgium) Sylvain Geboers	Métisse	-	-	-	-	-	-	-	-	-	-	-	-	-	-	-	-	-	-	4	-	-	-	-	-	-	-	-	-	0

=== 250cc ===
(Results in italics indicate overall winner)

Pos	Rider	Machine	ESP (Spain)		BEL (Belgium)		CH (Switzerland)		TCH (Czechoslovakia)		GER (West Germany)		LUX (Luxembourg)		ITA (Italy)		UK (United Kingdom)		SWE (Sweden)		FIN (Finland)		USSR (Soviet Union)		POL (Poland)		GDR (East Germany)		FRA (France)		Pts
Pos	Rider	Machine	R1	R2	R1	R2	R1	R2	R1	R2	R1	R2	R1	R2	R1	R2	R1	R2	R1	R2	R1	R2	R1	R2	R1	R2	R1	R2	R1	R2	
1	(Belgium) Joël Robert	ČZ	11	8	1	1	1	1	1	1	1	2	2	2	6	2	2	1	1	3	1	1	1	2	-	-	1	-	26	-	56
1	(Sweden) Torsten Hallman	Husqvarna	1	1	3	2	10	5	-	2	2	4	3	5	4	1	3	-	2	2	4	4	-	-	2	1	-	-	2	1	50
3	(Soviet Union) Victor Arbekov	ČZ	-	-	-	-	5	4	5	4	-	-	5	4	8	7	-	-	6	6	3	2	3	1	1	-	2	3	6	-	31
4	(Soviet Union) Igor Grigoriev	ČZ	-	-	4	5	3	2	4	7	-	-	7	7	3	3	-	-	10	13	6	7	4	3	6	3	4	4	3	6	30
5	(United Kingdom) Dave Bickers	Greeves	3	7	2	-	8	-	2	-	-	1	1	1	1	-	1	2	8	1	-	-	5	5	-	-	-	-	27	20	23
6	(Sweden) Åke Jonsson	Husqvarna	-	-	-	-	-	-	-	-	-	-	-	-	-	-	-	-	3	4	2	3	2	-	-	-	3	5	1	2	19
7	(Czechoslovakia) Vlastimil Válek	ČZ	-	3	6	4	2	10	-	3	3	6	8	3	9	11	-	3	5	5	-	5	6	7	-	-	-	1	4	3	16
8	(Czechoslovakia) Karel Pilař	ČZ	6	5	10	10	4	3	6	6	5	5	6	6	5	4	6	-	-	-	-	-	-	-	-	-	-	-	9	5	13
9	(Soviet Union) Gunnar Draougs	ČZ	-	-	-	-	-	-	-	-	-	-	-	-	-	-	-	-	-	-	-	-	-	6	3	2	5	2	26	-	12
10	(Sweden) Cenneth Loof	Husqvarna	8	10	16	8	6	6	-	-	4	3	4	11	7	5	-	-	4	8	-	-	-	-	-	-	-	-	20	-	7
11	(United Kingdom) Don Rickman	Bultaco	2	2	-	-	-	-	-	-	-	-	-	-	2	-	-	9	-	-	-	-	-	-	-	-	-	-	24	-	6
12	(Sweden) Jan Johansson	Lindstrom	7	-	5	3	-	-	-	-	-	-	-	-	-	-	-	-	-	-	7	8	-	-	-	-	-	-	5	4	6
13	(Sweden) Olle Pettersson	Husqvarna	4	6	9	6	9	-	-	-	-	-	-	-	-	-	9	10	7	9	5	6	7	4	-	-	-	-	7	-	6
14	(United Kingdom) John Griffith	Greeves	5	4	-	-	7	-	-	-	-	-	-	-	-	-	8	-	-	-	-	-	-	-	-	-	-	-	-	-	4
14	(United Kingdom) Malcolm Davis	Greeves	-	-	-	-	-	-	-	-	-	-	-	-	-	-	5	5	-	-	-	-	-	-	-	-	-	-	-	-	4
14	(Czechoslovakia) Antonín Hrach	ČZ	-	-	12	13	-	-	7	9	-	-	-	9	21	-	-	-	-	-	-	-	-	-	4	4	7	12	14	9	3
17	(Czechoslovakia) Zdeněk Polanka	ČZ	-	-	-	-	-	-	3	8	-	-	-	-	-	-	-	-	-	-	-	-	-	-	-	-	-	-	-	-	3
17	(United Kingdom) Bryan Goss	Greeves	-	-	-	-	-	-	-	-	-	-	-	-	-	-	4	6	-	-	-	-	-	-	-	-	-	-	-	-	3
19	(United Kingdom) Derek Rickman	Bultaco	18	-	7	7	-	-	-	-	7	9	10	-	-	-	7	8	-	-	-	-	-	-	-	-	-	-	25	18	3
20	(Poland) Eungenius Frelich	MZ	-	-	-	-	-	-	-	-	-	-	-	-	-	-	-	-	-	-	-	-	-	-	5	6	-	-	-	-	2
20	(Switzerland) Max Morf	ČZ	-	-	-	-	-	-	-	-	-	-	-	-	-	-	-	-	-	-	-	-	-	-	-	-	9	6	-	-	2
20	(Finland) Jaakko Lehmuskoski	Husqvarna	-	-	-	-	-	-	-	-	-	-	-	-	-	-	-	-	-	-	9	-	-	-	-	5	6	11	-	-	2
23	(West Germany) Fritz Betzelbacher	Montesa	-	15	-	-	-	-	-	-	9	7	-	-	-	-	-	-	-	-	-	-	-	-	-	-	-	-	31	-	1
23	(Netherlands) Fritz Selling	Greeves	-	-	-	-	-	-	-	-	-	-	-	-	-	-	10	7	-	-	-	-	-	-	-	-	-	-	16	22	1
-	(West Germany) Adolf Weil	Maico	-	-	13	-	-	-	-	-	6	-	11	-	-	-	-	-	-	-	-	-	-	-	-	-	-	-	-	-	0
-	(United Kingdom) Alan Clough	Greeves	-	-	-	-	-	-	-	-	-	-	-	-	-	-	-	4	-	-	-	-	-	-	-	-	-	-	-	-	0
