= 1965 FIM Motocross World Championship =

Motocross championship season

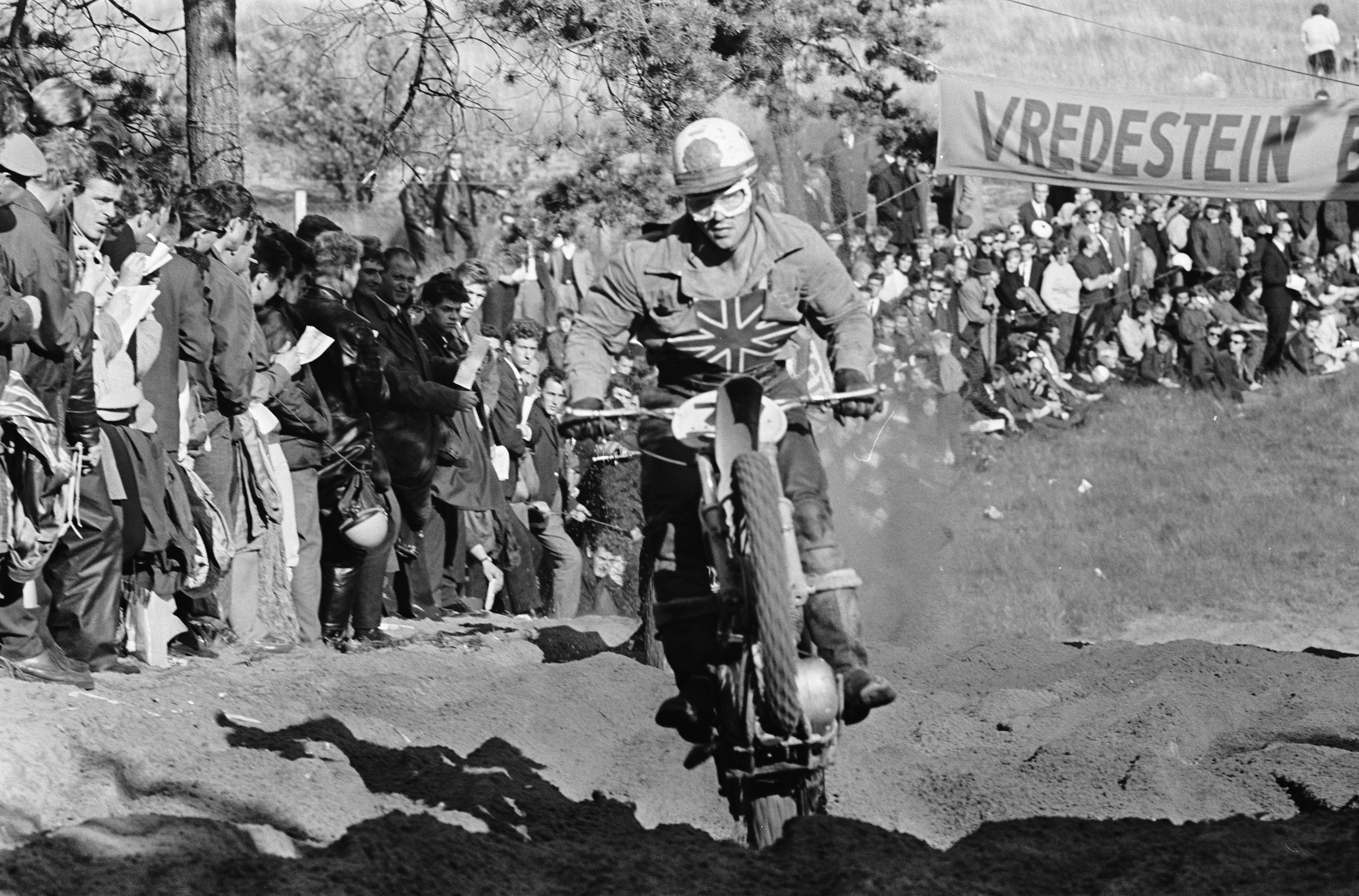
- Jeff Smith in action at the 500cc Dutch Grand Prix on 25 July 1965 in Bergharen, Holland.
- Organizer: FIM
- Duration: 28 March/3 October
- Races: 28
- Manufacturers: 12

Champions
- 500cc: (United Kingdom) Jeff Smith
- 250cc: (Soviet Union) Victor Arbekov

FIM Motocross World Championship
- ← 1964 1966 →

The 1965 Motocross World Championship was the 9th edition of the Motocross World Championship organized by the FIM and reserved for 500cc and 250cc motorcycles.

== Summary ==
Jeff Smith won his second consecutive 500cc motocross world championship for the BSA factory racing team with six Grand Prix victories. Paul Friedrichs took three victories to claim second place for the ČZ factory, ahead of former world champion Rolf Tibblin.

Before the 500cc championship opening round even began, former World Champions Rolf Tibblin and Bill Nilsson were involved in a serious accident while preparing for the race. Tibblin and Nilsson were test-riding motorcycles in their hotel parking lot when they collided in a blind corner. Neither rider was wearing their protective riding apparel, and Nilsson suffered a broken arm, an amputated toe, and a concussion, while Tibblin lost the end of his little finger and also received a concussion, which forced him to sit out the start of the season.

Smith's win riding a BSA Victor marked the last time that a four-stroke engine powered motorcycle would win the 500cc motocross world championship for the next several decades, as two-stroke engine technology began to dominate off-road motorcycle racing until 2003, when mounting government environmental regulations caused the FIM to implement new rules favoring environmentally friendlier four-stroke engines. Defending 250cc World Champion Joël Robert was invited by the ČZ factory to compete in the 500cc Czechoslovak Grand Prix during a break in the 250cc World Championship schedule. Robert was leading the first heat race when his motorcycle experienced a mechanical failure, before rebounding to win the second heat race in a rare 500cc class appearance.

In the 250cc division, Russian ČZ rider Victor Arbekov claimed the world championship ahead of the defending champion, Joël Robert. Robert was considered the fastest motocross racer in the world at the time but his lackadaisical attitude towards physical fitness training and voracious appetite for the good life meant that he didn't always live up to expectations. Although Robert won three Grand Prix races in 1965, his World Championship title defense was marred by crashes, mechanical failures and minor injuries. Torsten Hallman was completing his senior year in college in 1965 and the heavy workload meant he had to reduce his racing schedule. Arbekov filled the void left by his two main rivals by winning five Grand Prix races, securing the 1965 World Championship ahead of his nearest challenger, Robert, at the penultimate round in Sweden. Future five-time World Champion Roger De Coster made his first World Championship appearance at the 250cc French Grand Prix. The Suzuki factory became the first Japanese manufacturer to compete in a motocross world championship event, with riders Kazuo Kubo and Matsuhisa Kojima entering the 250cc Swedish Grand Prix on 25 July.

== Grands Prix ==
=== 500cc ===
Round	Date	Grand Prix	Location	Race 1 Winner	Race 2 Winner	Overall Winner	Report
1	April 4	(Austria) Austrian Grand Prix	Sittendorf	(United Kingdom) Arthur Lampkin	(Netherlands) Broer Dirks	(Sweden) Sten Lundin	Report
2	April 11	(Switzerland) Swiss Grand Prix	Wohlen	(United Kingdom) Jeff Smith	(Sweden) Sten Lundin	(United Kingdom) Jeff Smith	Report
3	April 25	(France) French Grand Prix	Tarare	(United Kingdom) Jeff Smith	(United Kingdom) Jeff Smith	(United Kingdom) Jeff Smith	Report
4	May 9	(Finland) Finnish Grand Prix	Tikkurila	(United Kingdom) Jeff Smith	(United Kingdom) Jeff Smith	(United Kingdom) Jeff Smith	Report
5	May 30	(Sweden) Swedish Grand Prix	Knutstorp	(United Kingdom) Jeff Smith	(United Kingdom) Jeff Smith	(United Kingdom) Jeff Smith	Report
6	June 6	(East Germany) East German Grand Prix	Gumpelstadt	(East Germany) Paul Friedrichs	(East Germany) Paul Friedrichs	(East Germany) Paul Friedrichs	Report
7	June 20	(Czechoslovakia) Czechoslovak Grand Prix	Sedlčany	(East Germany) Paul Friedrichs	(Belgium) Joël Robert	(East Germany) Paul Friedrichs	Report
8	June 27	(Soviet Union) Russian Grand Prix	Kyiv	(Soviet Union) Igor Grigoriev	(Soviet Union) Igor Grigoriev	(Soviet Union) Igor Grigoriev	Report
9	July 4	(United Kingdom) British Grand Prix	Hawkstone Park	(United Kingdom) Jeff Smith	(Sweden) Rolf Tibblin	(United Kingdom) Jeff Smith	Report
10	July 11	(Italy) Italian Grand Prix	Imola	(Sweden) Sten Lundin	(Sweden) Rolf Tibblin	(Sweden) Rolf Tibblin	Report
11	July 18	(West Germany) West German Grand Prix	Bielstein	(Sweden) Rolf Tibblin	(Sweden) Rolf Tibblin	(Sweden) Rolf Tibblin	Report
12	July 25	(Netherlands) Dutch Grand Prix	Bergharen	(United Kingdom) Jeff Smith	(Belgium) Jef Teuwissen	(United Kingdom) Jeff Smith	Report
13	August 8	Luxembourg Grand Prix	Ettelbruck	(Sweden) Rolf Tibblin	(East Germany) Paul Friedrichs	(East Germany) Paul Friedrichs	Report

=== 250cc ===
Round	Date	Grand Prix	Location	Race 1 Winner	Race 2 Winner	Overall Winner	Report
1	March 28	(Spain) Spanish Grand Prix	Sabadell	(Sweden) Torsten Hallman	(Sweden) Åke Jonsson	(United Kingdom) Dave Bickers	Report
2	April 4	(Italy) Italian Grand Prix	Masserano	(Soviet Union) Victor Arbekov	(Belgium) Joël Robert	(Soviet Union) Victor Arbekov	Report
3	April 11	(France) French Grand Prix	Saint-Quentin	(Belgium) Joël Robert	(Soviet Union) Victor Arbekov	(Soviet Union) Victor Arbekov	Report
4	April 25	(Belgium) Belgian Grand Prix	Hechtel-Eksel	(United Kingdom) Dave Bickers	(United Kingdom) Dave Bickers	(United Kingdom) Dave Bickers	Report
5	May 9	(Czechoslovakia) Czechoslovak Grand Prix	Holice	(Belgium) Joël Robert	(Czechoslovakia) Vlastimil Válek	(Czechoslovakia) Vlastimil Válek	Report
6	May 16	(West Germany) West German Grand Prix	Beuren	(Soviet Union) Victor Arbekov	(Soviet Union) Victor Arbekov	(Soviet Union) Victor Arbekov	Report
7	May 23	(Netherlands) Dutch Grand Prix	Makkinga	(Soviet Union) Victor Arbekov	(Soviet Union) Victor Arbekov	(Soviet Union) Victor Arbekov	Report
8	May 30	Luxembourg Grand Prix	Schifflange	(Belgium) Joël Robert	(Belgium) Joël Robert	(Belgium) Joël Robert	Report
9	June 27	(Poland) Polish Grand Prix	Kielce	(Soviet Union) Victor Arbekov	(Belgium) Joël Robert	(Soviet Union) Victor Arbekov	Report
10	July 4	(Soviet Union) Russian Grand Prix	Moscow	(Soviet Union) Victor Arbekov	(Belgium) Joël Robert	(Belgium) Joël Robert	Report
11	July 11	(East Germany) East German Grand Prix	Apolda	(Belgium) Joël Robert	(East Germany) Paul Friedrichs	(East Germany) Paul Friedrichs	Report
12	July 18	(United Kingdom) British Grand Prix	Glastonbury	(United Kingdom) Dave Bickers	(Belgium) Joël Robert	(United Kingdom) Dave Bickers	Report
13	July 25	(Sweden) Swedish Grand Prix	Hedemora	(Soviet Union) Victor Arbekov	(Sweden) Torsten Hallman	(Sweden) Torsten Hallman	Report
14	August 1	(Finland) Finnish Grand Prix	Hyvinkää	(Sweden) Torsten Hallman	(Sweden) Torsten Hallman	(Sweden) Torsten Hallman	Report
15	October 3	(Austria) Austrian Grand Prix	Launsdorf	(Belgium) Joël Robert	(Belgium) Joël Robert	(Belgium) Joël Robert	Report

== Final standings ==
Points are awarded to the top 6 classified finishers. For the 500cc final championship standings, the 7 best of 14 results are retained. For the 250cc final championship standings, the 7 best of 15 results are retained.

Position	1st	2nd	3rd	4th	5th	6th
Points	8	6	4	3	2	1

=== 500cc ===
(Results in italics indicate overall winner)

Pos	Rider	Machine	AUT (Austria)		CH (Switzerland)		FRA (France)		FIN (Finland)		SWE (Sweden)		DDR (East Germany)		TCH (Czechoslovakia)		USSR (Soviet Union)		UK (United Kingdom)		ITA (Italy)		GER (West Germany)		NED (Netherlands)		LUX (Luxembourg)		Points
Pos	Rider	Machine	R1	R2	R1	R2	R1	R2	R1	R2	R1	R2	R1	R2	R1	R2	R1	R2	R1	R2	R1	R2	R1	R2	R1	R2	R1	R2	
1	(United Kingdom) Jeff Smith	BSA	-	-	1	2	1	1	1	1	1	1	4	4	-	-	2	2	1	2	-	-	3	-	1	3	3	-	54
2	(East Germany) Paul Friedrichs	ČZ	-	-	-	-	-	-	2	2	5	6	1	1	1	2	-	4	7	9	-	-	-	-	2	4	4	1	36
3	(Sweden) Rolf Tibblin	Hedlund	-	-	12	5	-	-	-	-	-	-	-	-	-	-	-	-	-	-	-	-	-	-	-	-	-	-	32
3	(Sweden) Rolf Tibblin	ČZ	-	-	-	-	-	-	-	-	9	8	3	-	-	7	4	3	3	1	2	1	1	1	3	2	1	-	32
3	(United Kingdom) Vic Eastwood	BSA	3	-	9	3	4	4	4	3	2	4	2	2	-	-	-	-	2	3	6	2	4	-	4	5	5	3	32
5	(Sweden) Sten Lundin	Matchless-Métisse	2	3	2	1	-	-	-	-	6	2	5	3	-	-	-	-	-	-	1	3	-	-	-	-	2	-	27
6	(Sweden) Per Olaf Persson	Hedlund	-	-	5	4	5	2	-	-	4	3	6	-	-	-	-	-	12	12	4	11	5	-	-	-	-	-	13
7	(United Kingdom) Arthur Lampkin	BSA	1	-	-	-	3	5	-	-	-	-	-	-	-	5	-	5	4	5	NC	4	-	-	-	-	10	2	11
8	(United Kingdom) Jerry Scott	Cheney-BSA	-	-	3	7	2	3	8	-	-	-	-	-	-	-	-	-	6	7	NC	NC	-	-	-	-	-	-	10
8	(Sweden) Gunnar Johansson	AMC-Métisse	4	4	15	6	-	-	7	6	-	-	-	-	-	-	-	-	-	-	5	NC	11	4	-	-	13	6	10
10	(United Kingdom) Chris Horsfield	Matchless	10	2	4	-	-	-	-	-	7	5	-	-	-	-	-	-	9	11	NC	-	-	-	-	-	6	4	8
10	(Czechoslovakia) Josef Hřebeček	ČZ	5	7	6	8	-	-	-	-	10	-	-	-	2	6	6	-	10	10	NC	NC	-	-	-	-	-	-	8
10	(Soviet Union) Igor Grigoriev	ČZ/ESO	-	-	-	-	-	-	-	-	-	-	-	-	-	-	1	1	-	-	-	-	-	-	-	-	-	-	8
10	(Sweden) Ove Lundell	Hedlund/Husqvarna	-	-	-	-	-	-	11	-	-	12	-	-	-	-	-	-	-	-	-	-	2	2	6	8	9	7	8
14	(Soviet Union) Antonin Klavinsh	ESO	7	6	7	15	-	-	6	5	11	7	-	-	-	-	3	-	-	-	-	-	-	-	-	-	-	-	6
14	(Belgium) Herman De Soete	Matchless	-	5	8	-	7	6	-	-	-	-	-	-	-	-	-	-	-	-	-	-	6	3	-	-	12	5	6
14	(Sweden) Jan Johansson	Lindstrom	-	-	-	-	-	-	3	4	-	-	-	-	6	4	-	-	-	-	-	-	-	-	-	-	-	-	6
14	(Czechoslovakia) Karel Pilař	ČZ	-	-	-	-	-	-	-	-	-	-	-	-	4	3	-	-	-	-	-	-	-	-	-	-	-	-	6
18	(Netherlands) Broer Dirkx	Lito	8	1	-	-	-	-	-	-	-	-	-	-	-	-	-	-	-	-	-	13	-	-	-	-	-	-	4
18	(Czechoslovakia) Ervín Krajčovič	ESO	-	-	-	-	-	-	-	-	-	-	8	6	3	8	-	-	-	-	8	7	-	-	-	-	-	-	4
18	(Belgium) Jef Teuwissen	Triumph-Métisse	-	-	-	-	-	-	-	-	-	-	-	-	-	-	-	-	-	8	10	5	-	-	5	1	-	-	4
21	(Switzerland) Pierre-André Rapin	Monark	-	-	-	-	-	-	-	-	-	-	-	-	-	-	-	-	-	-	7	6	-	-	-	-	-	-	4
22	(Czechoslovakia) Vladimír Dubšík	ČZ	-	-	-	-	-	-	-	-	-	-	7	5	10	13	-	-	-	-	-	-	-	-	-	-	-	-	2
22	(East Germany) Joachim Helmhold	ČZ	-	-	-	-	-	-	5	-	-	-	-	-	5	-	-	-	-	-	-	-	-	-	8	6	-	-	2
22	(United Kingdom) John Giles	Triumph	-	-	-	-	-	-	-	-	-	-	-	-	-	-	-	-	5	6	-	-	-	-	-	-	-	-	2
22	(West Germany) Erwin Schmider	Maico	-	-	-	-	-	-	-	-	-	-	-	-	-	-	-	-	-	-	-	-	8	9	19	11	-	-	2
26	(Czechoslovakia) Jan Němeček	ESO	-	-	-	-	-	-	-	-	-	-	-	-	14	10	-	-	-	-	14	NC	-	5	-	-	-	-	1
-	(Belgium) Sylvain Geboers	Matchless	6	-	-	-	6	-	-	-	12	15	-	-	-	-	-	-	8	-	-	-	-	-	-	-	-	-	0
-	(Belgium) Joël Robert	ČZ	-	-	-	-	-	-	-	-	-	-	-	-	-	1	-	-	-	-	-	-	-	-	-	-	-	-	0
-	(Sweden) Bill Nilsson	ESO	-	-	-	-	-	-	-	-	-	-	-	-	-	-	5	-	-	-	3	-	-	-	-	-	-	-	0
-	(United Kingdom) Derek Rickman	Metisse	-	-	-	-	-	-	-	-	-	-	-	-	-	-	-	-	-	4	-	-	-	-	-	-	-	-	0
-	(Sweden) Hasse Hansson	Lindstrom	-	-	-	-	-	-	-	-	3	-	-	-	-	-	-	-	-	-	-	-	-	-	-	-	-	-	0

=== 250cc ===
(Results in italics indicate overall winner)

Pos	Rider	Machine	ESP (Spain)		ITA (Italy)		FRA (France)		BEL (Belgium)		TCH (Czechoslovakia)		GER (West Germany)		NED (Netherlands)		LUX (Luxembourg)		POL (Poland)		USSR (Soviet Union)		GDR (East Germany)		UK (United Kingdom)		SWE (Sweden)		FIN (Finland)		AUT (Austria)		Pts
Pos	Rider	Machine	R1	R2	R1	R2	R1	R2	R1	R2	R1	R2	R1	R2	R1	R2	R1	R2	R1	R2	R1	R2	R1	R2	R1	R2	R1	R2	R1	R2	R1	R2	
1	(Soviet Union) Victor Arbekov	ČZ	2	9	1	2	2	1	-	-	-	-	1	1	1	1	2	2	1	2	1	18	-	-	-	-	1	2	-	-	-	-	52
2	(Belgium) Joël Robert	ČZ	4	-	2	1	1	2	-	-	1	-	2	2	2	-	1	1	-	1	3	1	1	3	-	1	-	-	-	-	1	1	48
3	(United Kingdom) Dave Bickers	Greeves	6	2	3	3	-	-	1	1	5	2	5	5	-	-	3	3	-	-	-	-	-	-	1	2	4	3	3	3	3	2	42
4	(Sweden) Torsten Hallman	Husqvarna	1	8	-	-	5	6	4	2	3	3	-	-	-	-	9	7	-	-	-	-	-	-	-	-	2	1	1	1	-	-	35
5	(Sweden) Åke Jonsson	Husqvarna	7	1	-	-	6	11	6	3	4	6	4	3	-	-	10	4	4	6	6	2	4	2	4	4	5	4	14	7	-	-	30
6	(Czechoslovakia) Vlastimil Válek	Jawa/ČZ	-	-	6	4	-	-	3	6	2	1	-	-	4	4	6	5	6	5	4	-	2	10	3	5	3	-	-	5	-	-	28
7	(Soviet Union) Gunnar Draougs	ČZ	3	-	4	-	4	3	-	-	7	-	3	6	6	2	5	6	2	3	2	-	5	4	-	-	-	-	-	-	-	-	25
8	(Czechoslovakia) Karel Pilař	ČZ	-	-	7	5	7	4	7	5	-	-	-	-	11	7	8	8	5	-	-	4	6	6	5	6	7	7	-	-	4	5	15
9	(United Kingdom) Don Rickman	Bultaco	5	6	-	-	-	-	-	-	-	-	-	-	-	-	-	-	-	-	-	-	-	-	2	3	-	-	-	-	-	-	8
9	(Soviet Union) Igor Grigoriev	ČZ	-	-	-	-	-	-	-	-	-	-	-	-	-	-	-	-	-	-	5	3	-	-	-	-	-	-	-	-	2	3	8
9	(East Germany) Paul Friedrichs	ČZ	-	-	-	-	-	-	-	-	-	-	-	-	-	-	-	-	-	-	-	-	3	1	-	-	-	-	-	-	5	-	8
12	(Netherlands) Fritz Selling	Greeves	-	-	-	-	-	-	-	-	-	-	-	-	3	3	11	11	-	-	-	-	12	-	7	8	-	-	-	-	-	-	7
13	(Finland) Jorma Jarvinen	Husqvarna	-	-	-	-	-	-	-	-	-	-	-	-	-	-	-	-	-	-	-	-	-	-	-	-	-	-	2	2	-	-	6
14	(East Germany) Fred Willamowski	ČZ	-	-	-	-	-	-	-	-	10	8	-	-	15	-	-	-	3	4	-	-	7	8	-	-	10	5	4	-	6	-	5
15	(Soviet Union) Juri Ageyev	ČZ	-	-	-	-	-	-	-	-	-	-	8	4	-	5	-	-	-	-	-	-	9	9	-	-	-	-	-	-	-	-	4
16	(Finland) Kalevi Vehkonen	Husqvarna	-	-	-	-	-	-	-	-	-	-	-	-	-	-	-	-	-	-	-	-	-	-	-	-	-	-	5	4	-	-	3
17	(Sweden) Jan Blomqvist	Husqvarna	-	4	-	-	9	5	11	4	9	-	-	-	7	-	7	9	-	-	-	-	-	-	-	-	8	8	-	-	-	-	2
17	(Sweden) Olle Pettersson	Bultaco-Métisse	-	-	-	-	-	-	-	-	8	5	-	-	-	-	-	-	-	-	-	-	-	-	-	-	-	-	6	-	-	-	2
17	(Soviet Union) Alex Yakolev	ČZ	-	-	-	-	15	7	-	-	-	-	-	-	-	-	-	-	-	-	8	7	-	-	-	-	-	-	-	-	-	-	2
17	(United Kingdom) Bryan Goss	Husqvarna	-	-	-	-	-	-	-	-	-	-	-	-	-	-	-	-	-	-	-	-	-	-	21	-	-	-	-	-	-	4	2
17	(United Kingdom) John Griffith	Greeves	-	-	5	6	-	-	-	-	-	-	-	-	-	-	-	-	-	-	-	-	-	-	-	-	-	-	-	-	-	-	2
17	(Czechoslovakia) Antonín Hrach	Jawa/ČZ	-	-	-	-	-	-	10	13	13	4	-	-	-	-	14	12	-	-	-	-	-	-	-	-	-	-	-	-	-	6	2
23	(Netherlands) Ton van Heugten	Husqvarna	-	-	-	-	-	-	-	-	-	-	-	-	10	6	-	-	-	-	-	-	-	-	-	-	-	-	-	-	-	-	1
23	(Czechoslovakia) Ivan Poláš	Jawa/ČZ	-	-	-	-	-	-	-	-	17	10	-	-	-	-	-	-	-	-	-	6	8	5	15	9	9	10	-	-	-	-	1
23	(Sweden) Cenneth Loof	Husqvarna	-	-	-	-	-	-	-	-	-	-	7	-	-	-	-	-	-	-	-	-	-	-	-	-	-	-	-	6	-	-	1
23	(Soviet Union) Andrei Dezhinov	ČZ	10	3	-	-	-	10	-	-	6	-	9	-	-	-	12	-	-	-	-	-	-	-	-	-	-	9	-	-	-	-	1
-	(Belgium) Marcel Wiertz	ČZ	9	5	15	-	14	23	5	22	-	-	-	-	9	12	18	13	-	-	-	-	-	-	-	-	-	-	-	-	-	-	0
-	(United Kingdom) Alan Clough	Greeves	-	-	-	-	3	-	2	-	-	-	-	-	-	-	4	-	-	-	-	-	-	-	-	-	-	-	-	-	-	-	0
-	(Belgium) Roger De Coster	ČZ	-	-	-	-	17	26	-	11	-	-	-	-	-	-	-	-	-	-	-	-	-	-	-	-	-	-	-	-	-	-	0
