= Dave Bickers =

English motocross racer

- Dave Bickers pictured in 1966
- Nationality: British
- Born: 17 January 1938 Coddenham, Suffolk, England
- Died: 6 July 2014 (aged 76) Coddenham, Suffolk, England

Motocross career
- Years active: 1959–1969
- Teams: Dot, Greeves, Matchless, Husqvarna, ČZ
- Championships: European 250cc - 1960, 1961
- Wins: 18

David Geoffrey Bickers (17 January 1938 – 6 July 2014) was an English professional motocross racer from Coddenham, Suffolk. He competed in the Motocross World Championships from 1959 to 1969. Bickers won two European motocross championships and was a member of British motocross teams that won two Motocross des Nations events as well as two Trophée des Nations events. Bickers was awarded the Motorcycle News 'Man of the Year' award in 1960.

== Motorcycling career ==
In the early 1960s, Bickers was one of the top motorcycle racers in the sport of scrambles, which eventually became more widely known by the European term 'motocross'. He began competing in motorcycle scrambles at the age of 15 just before the official age which he was eligible to ride, which was sixteen, and he was so successful that he was rewarded with a sponsorship from the Dot motorcycle company.

Bickers' riding talent got him noticed by Greeves factory rider, Brian Stonebridge, who then recommended that Bickers be hired by Greeves in 1958. The middle-1960s saw the start of the move away from traditional large-capacity four-stroke engines to two-strokes. In the 1960 250cc European Motocross Championship, Bickers rode two-stroke engined Greeves motorcycles to win Grand Prix races in Switzerland, Poland, Sweden and West Germany and clinched the title ahead of Vice-Champion, Jeff Smith. The European championship was considered to be the world championship at the time, as the sport of motocross had yet to develop outside of Europe.

Bickers dominated the 1961 season winning 6 out of 13 Grand Prix races and set a season record with 14 individual race victories. At the inaugural Trophée des Nations event for 250cc machines in 1961, Bickers was the second highest individual points scorer behind Torsten Hallman, helping the British team to victory over the powerful Swedish and Belgian teams.

When the FIM upgraded the European Motocross Championship to World Championship status for the 1962 season, the Greeves factory chose to stay home and compete in the British championships. However, Bickers did compete in the British round of the 1962 250cc motocross World Championship held at Glastonbury, where he took the victory over the eventual World Champion, Torsten Hallman. At the 1962 Trophée des Nations event, Bickers won both heat races as the British team once again triumphed over the Swedish and Belgian teams.

Bickers joined the ČZ factory racing team in 1966 and scored two second-place results to finish the season ranked fifth in the 500cc motocross world championship. He was a member of the victorious British team at the 1966 Motocross des Nations, where Bickers placed in a tie as top points scorers of the event, alongside the Soviet Union's Victor Arbekov and Belgium's Joël Robert, who also rode for the ČZ factory racing team.

In 1967, Bickers won the Swedish and Luxembourg Grand Prix events and improved to third place in the season final classification behind World Champion, Paul Friedrichs and Vice-Champion, Jeff Smith. He also helped the British team win the 1967 Motocross des Nations event over the Swedish and Belgian teams. The 1967 triumph would be the last Motocross des Nations victory for a British team until 1994.

After the 1967 world championships, Bickers joined his ČZ factory teammates Joël Robert and Roger De Coster, along with Husqvarna teammates, Torsten Hallman Åke Jonsson and Arne Kring, in a series of exhibition races in the United States that had been organized by Edison Dye, the American importer for Husqvarna motorcycles. The exhibition races served as a means to introduce the sport of motocross to an American audience, and eventually led to the formation of the Inter-AM and Trans-AMA motocross series that helped to popularize the sport of motocross in the United States.

As one of the first European riders to race in the United States, Bickers helped to introduce Americans to the sport of motocross. He raced in the 1970 Inter-AM Motocross Series and he placed second in the 1971 Inter-AMA motocross series behind ČZ teammate Vlastimil Válek. He also competed in the Trans-AMA motocross series in 1971 and 1972.

Bickers won 38 individual heat races and 18 Grand Prix victories during his world championship racing career. He won two 250cc European Motocross Championships (1960, 1961), five 250cc British Motocross Championships (1960, 1962–1965) and one 500cc British national motocross championship (1966). He was a member of two victorious British Trophée des Nations teams (1961, 1962) and one victorious British Motocross des Nations team (1966). Bickers was the top individual points scorer at the 1962 Trophée des Nations event and the 1966 Motocross des Nations event.

Bickers was the UK importer for the 250 cc and 360 cc CZ scramblers together with a trials bike, followed by CZ roadsters and Jawa models in 1973, selling both marques initially from his premises at Woodbridge Road, Ipswich, Suffolk, followed by a move to Farthing Road Industrial Estate, Ipswich.

== Film industry career ==
After retiring from competition, Bickers started a company manufacturing stunt equipment used in the film industry. He also appeared as a stunt double for Roger Moore in Octopussy and Escape to Athena among other film work.

Bickers died after a stroke on 6 July 2014.

== Motocross Grand Prix Results ==
Points system from 1952 to 1968:

| Position | 1st | 2nd | 3rd | 4th | 5th | 6th |
|---|---|---|---|---|---|---|
| Points | 8 | 6 | 4 | 3 | 2 | 1 |

Points system from 1969 to 1980:

| Position | 1 | 2 | 3 | 4 | 5 | 6 | 7 | 8 | 9 | 10 |
|---|---|---|---|---|---|---|---|---|---|---|
| Points | 15 | 12 | 10 | 8 | 6 | 5 | 4 | 3 | 2 | 1 |

| Denotes European motocross championship only. |

| Year | Class | Machine | 1 | | 2 | | 3 | | 4 | | 5 | | 6 | | 7 | | 8 | | 9 | | 10 | | 11 | | 12 | | 13 | | 14 | | 15 | | Pos | Pts |
| Year | Class | Machine | R1 | R2 | R1 | R2 | R1 | R2 | R1 | R2 | R1 | R2 | R1 | R2 | R1 | R2 | R1 | R2 | R1 | R2 | R1 | R2 | R1 | R2 | R1 | R2 | R1 | R2 | R1 | R2 | R1 | R2 | Pos | Pts |
|---|---|---|---|---|---|---|---|---|---|---|---|---|---|---|---|---|---|---|---|---|---|---|---|---|---|---|---|---|---|---|---|---|---|---|
| 1959 | 250cc | Greeves | AUT - | AUT - | CH - | CH - | BEL - | BEL - | GDR - | GDR - | CZE - | CZE - | POL - | POL - | GER - | GER - | ITA - | ITA - | FRA - | FRA - | NED - | NED - | UK; 4 | UK; 4 | LUX - | LUX; 3 | SWE; 5 | SWE; 5 | | | | | 10th | 9 |
| 1960 | 250cc | Greeves | CH; 2 | CH; 3 | BEL; 5 | BEL; 1 | FRA; 3 | FRA; 1 | CZE; 4 | CZE; 4 | POL; 1 | POL; 1 | ITA - | ITA - | GDR; 5 | GDR; 6 | FIN; 3 | FIN; 8 | LUX; 2 | LUX; 1 | UK - | UK; 1 | SWE; 1 | SWE; 2 | GER; 1 | GER; 2 | | | | | | | 1st | 48 |
| 1961 | 250cc | Greeves | BEL; 1 | BEL; 1 | FRA; 1 | FRA; 1 | NED; 5 | NED; 2 | CZE; 1 | CZE - | POL; 1 | POL; 1 | LUX; 2 | LUX; 1 | FIN; 1 | FIN - | ITA - | ITA - | GER; 2 | GER - | UK; 1 | UK; 1 | CH - | CH; 1 | SWE; 1 | SWE; 1 | GDR - | GDR - | | | | | 1st | 51 |
| 1962 | 250cc | Greeves | ESP - | ESP - | CH - | CH - | BEL - | BEL - | FRA - | FRA - | CZE - | CZE - | POL - | POL - | NED - | NED - | LUX - | LUX - | FIN - | FIN - | USR - | USR - | GER - | GER - | ITA - | ITA - | UK; 1 | UK; 1 | SWE - | SWE - | GDR - | GDR - | 10th | 8 |
| 1962 | 500cc | Greeves | AUT - | AUT - | FRA - | FRA - | CH - | CH - | ITA - | ITA - | CZE - | CZE - | UK; 9 | UK; 5 | NED - | NED - | BEL - | BEL - | LUX - | LUX - | SWE - | SWE - | | | | | | | | | | | 14th | 2 |
| 1963 | 250cc | Greeves | ESP; 1 | ESP; 2 | ITA - | ITA - | FRA - | FRA - | CH - | CH - | GER; 3 | GER; 6 | LUX; 5 | LUX - | NED - | NED - | UK - | UK - | SWE - | SWE - | FIN - | FIN - | USR - | USR - | POL - | POL - | CZE - | CZE - | GDR - | GDR - | | | 7th | 12 |
| 1964 | 250cc | Greeves | ESP; 3 | ESP; 7 | BEL; 2 | BEL - | CH; 8 | CH - | CZE; 2 | CZE - | GER - | GER; 1 | LUX; 1 | LUX; 1 | ITA; 1 | ITA - | UK; 1 | UK; 2 | SWE; 8 | SWE; 1 | FIN - | FIN - | USR; 5 | USR; 5 | POL - | POL - | GDR - | GDR - | FRA; 27 | FRA; 20 | | | 5th | 23 |
| 1965 | 250cc | Greeves | ESP; 6 | ESP; 2 | ITA; 3 | ITA; 3 | FRA - | FRA - | BEL; 1 | BEL; 1 | CZE; 5 | CZE; 2 | GER; 5 | GER; 5 | NED - | NED - | LUX; 3 | LUX; 3 | POL - | POL - | USR - | USR - | GDR - | GDR - | UK; 1 | UK; 2 | SWE; 4 | SWE; 3 | FIN; 3 | FIN; 3 | AUT; 3 | AUT; 2 | 3rd | 42 |
| 1966 | 500cc | ČZ | CH - | CH; 32 | CH; 4 | AUT; 3 | AUT; 3 | ITA; 3 | ITA - | DEN; 4 | DEN; 5 | SWE; 3 | SWE - | FIN; 4 | FIN; 4 | GDR; 10 | GDR; 9 | CZE; 3 | CZE; 3 | USR; 5 | USR; 4 | UK; 5 | UK; 5 | NED; 2 | NED; 2 | BEL - | BEL - | LUX; 4 | LUX; 8 | GER; 3 | GER; 1 | | 5th | 32 |
| 1967 | 500cc | ČZ | AUT; 9 | AUT; 6 | ITA; 4 | ITA; 5 | SWE; 2 | SWE; 2 | CZE - | CZE - | USR - | USR - | FRA - | FRA - | GER - | GER - | UK; 6 | UK; 1 | BEL; 16 | BEL; 2 | LUX; 2 | LUX; 3 | CH; 3 | CH - | | | | | | | | | 3rd | 26 |
| 1968 | 250cc | ČZ | ESP; 6 | ESP; 3 | BEL; 6 | BEL; 8 | CZE; 7 | CZE - | FRA; 4 | FRA; 7 | NED; 24 | NED - | GER; 8 | GER; 12 | LUX; 2 | LUX; 3 | POL - | POL - | USR; 4 | USR; 3 | YUG; 5 | YUG; 7 | FIN - | FIN - | SWE; 7 | SWE; 6 | UK; 3 | UK; 4 | AUT; 7 | AUT; 5 | | | 5th | 21 |
| 1968 | 500cc | ČZ | AUT - | AUT - | ITA - | ITA - | SWE - | SWE - | FIN - | FIN - | GDR - | GDR - | CZE - | CZE - | UK; 4 | UK; 4 | GER - | GER - | FRA - | FRA - | NED - | NED - | BEL - | BEL - | LUX - | LUX - | CH - | CH - | | | | | 18th | 3 |
| 1969 | 250cc | ČZ | ESP - | ESP - | CH - | CH - | YUG - | YUG - | CZE - | CZE - | POL - | POL - | GER - | GER - | NED - | NED - | FRA - | FRA - | UK; 4 | UK; 1 | SWE - | SWE - | FIN - | FIN - | USR - | USR - | | | | | | | 19th | 12 |
