= 1963 FIM Motocross World Championship =

Motocross championship season

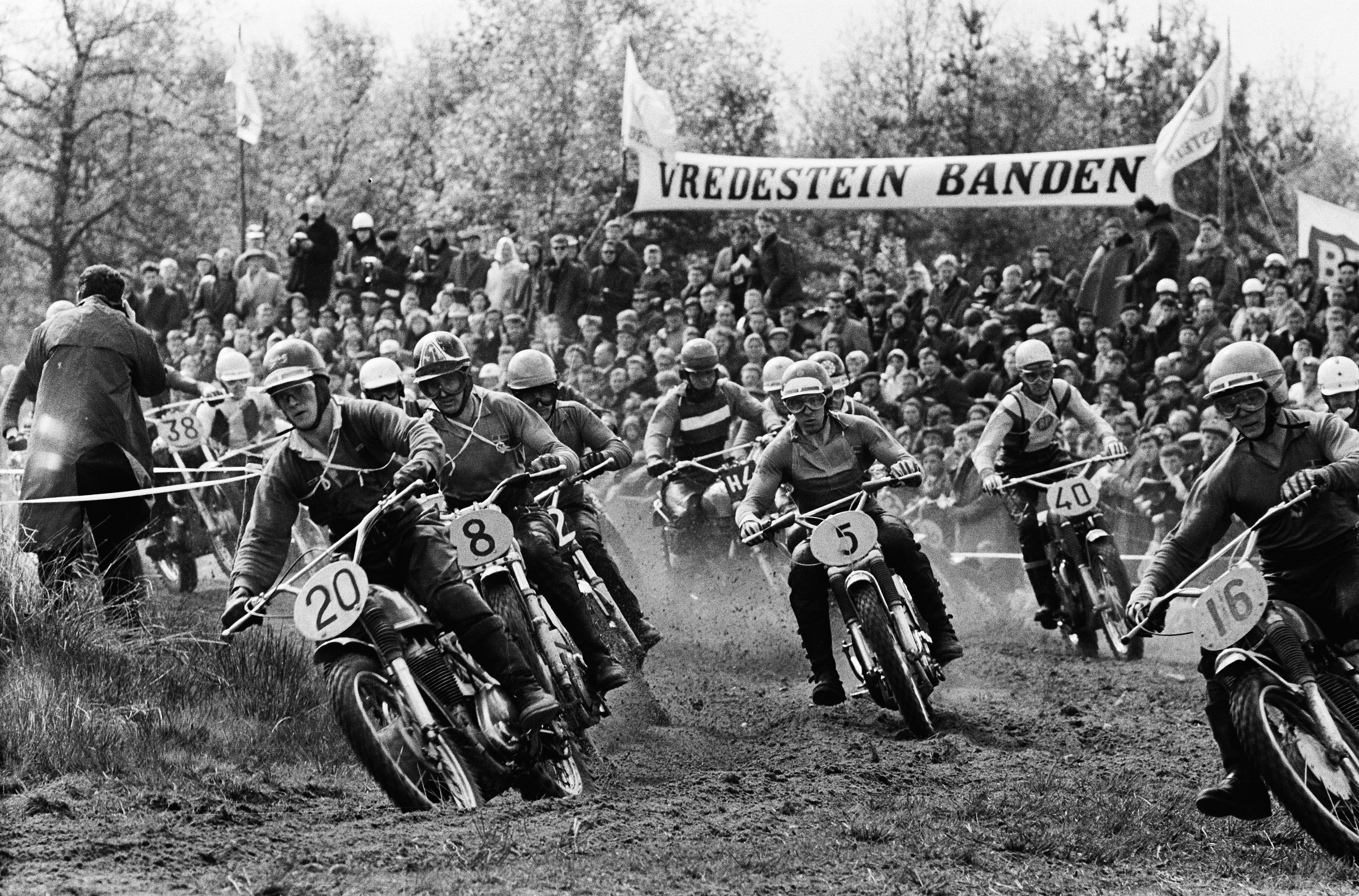
- Action from the 500cc Dutch Grand Prix on 19 May 1963 in Markelo, Holland.
- Organizer: FIM
- Duration: 22 March/8 September
- Number of races: 26
- Number of manufacturers: 16

Champions
- 500cc: (Sweden) Rolf Tibblin
- 250cc: (Sweden) Torsten Hallman

Motocross World Championship
- ← 1962 1964 →

The 1963 Motocross World Championship was the 7th edition of the Motocross World Championship organized by the FIM and reserved for 500cc and 250cc motorcycles.

== Summary ==
Rolf Tibblin overtook the early championship points leader, Jeff Smith, to claim his second consecutive 500cc motocross world championship, with his countryman Sten Lundin taking second place. Tibblin took five Grand Prix victories riding for the Husqvarna factory racing team.

A significant moment in motocross history occurred when ČZ factory rider Vlastimil Válek rode a 263cc two-stroke motorcycle to win the first moto of the 500cc Czechoslovak Grand Prix. The victory marked a turning point in motocross history, as it was the first win by a two-stroke powered motorcycle in the premier division of the Motocross World Championships. The FIM responded to protests from four-stroke manufacturers by increasing the minimum allowable displacement for two-stroke engines to 350cc.

Tibblin's Husqvarna teammate Torsten Hallman also claimed his second consecutive 250cc motocross world championship in dominating fashion by winning 8 of the 14 Grand Prix races. The ČZ factory continued to refine and improve their motorcycles, with riders Vlastimil Válek, Igor Grigoriev, and Karel Pilař finishing second, third, and fourth in the 250cc class final points standings.

== Grands Prix ==
=== 500cc ===
Round	Date	Grand Prix	Location	Race 1 Winner	Race 2 Winner	Overall Winner	Report
1	April 21	(Austria) Austrian Grand Prix	Sittendorf	(Sweden) Rolf Tibblin	(Sweden) Sten Lundin	(Sweden) Sten Lundin	Report
2	May 5	(Switzerland) Swiss Grand Prix	Wohlen	(Sweden) Bill Nilsson	(Sweden) Sten Lundin	(Sweden) Sten Lundin	Report
3	May 12	(Denmark) Danish Grand Prix	Volk Mølle	(United Kingdom) Jeff Smith	(United Kingdom) Jeff Smith	(United Kingdom) Jeff Smith	Report
4	May 19	(Netherlands) Dutch Grand Prix	Markelo	(United Kingdom) Jeff Smith	(Sweden) Rolf Tibblin	(Sweden) Rolf Tibblin	Report
5	May 20	(France) French Grand Prix	Saint-Quentin	(Sweden) Rolf Tibblin	(Sweden) Rolf Tibblin	(Sweden) Rolf Tibblin	Report
6	June 9	(Italy) Italian Grand Prix	Imola	(Sweden) Rolf Tibblin	(Sweden) Rolf Tibblin	(Sweden) Rolf Tibblin	Report
7	June 23	(Czechoslovakia) Czechoslovak Grand Prix	Divoká Šárka	(Czechoslovakia) Vlastimil Válek	(Sweden) Rolf Tibblin	(Sweden) Rolf Tibblin	Report
8	June 30	(Soviet Union) Russian Grand Prix	Lviv	(Sweden) Ove Lundell	(Sweden) Ove Lundell	(Sweden) Ove Lundell	Report
9	July 7	(United Kingdom) British Grand Prix	Hawkstone Park	(United Kingdom) Jeff Smith	(United Kingdom) Don Rickman	(United Kingdom) Jeff Smith	Report
10	August 3	(Belgium) Belgian Grand Prix	Namur	(Sweden) Rolf Tibblin	(Sweden) Rolf Tibblin	(Sweden) Rolf Tibblin	Report
11	August 11	Luxembourg Grand Prix	Ettelbruck	(Sweden) Ove Lundell	(Sweden) Per Olaf Persson	(Sweden) Sten Lundin	Report
12	September 8	(East Germany) East German Grand Prix	Gumpelstadt	(United Kingdom) Jeff Smith	(United Kingdom) Jeff Smith	(United Kingdom) Jeff Smith	Report

=== 250cc ===
Round	Date	Grand Prix	Location	Race 1 Winner	Race 2 Winner	Overall Winner	Report
1	March 22	(Spain) Spanish Grand Prix	Ruta	(United Kingdom) Dave Bickers	(Sweden) Torsten Hallman	(United Kingdom) Dave Bickers	Report
2	March 31	(Italy) Italian Grand Prix	Gallarate	(Sweden) Torsten Hallman	(Sweden) Torsten Hallman	(Sweden) Torsten Hallman	Report
3	April 14	(France) French Grand Prix	Pernes-les-Fontaines	(Sweden) Torsten Hallman	(Sweden) Torsten Hallman	(Sweden) Torsten Hallman	Report
4	April 21	(Switzerland) Swiss Grand Prix	Payerne	(Sweden) Torsten Hallman	(Sweden) Torsten Hallman	(Sweden) Torsten Hallman	Report
5	May 12	(West Germany) West German Grand Prix	Bielstein	(Sweden) Torsten Hallman	(Sweden) Torsten Hallman	(Sweden) Torsten Hallman	Report
6	May 26	Luxembourg Grand Prix	Schifflange	(Sweden) Torsten Hallman	(Sweden) Torsten Hallman	(Sweden) Torsten Hallman	Report
7	June 9	(Netherlands) Dutch Grand Prix	Bergharen	(Czechoslovakia) Vlastimil Válek	(Sweden) Torsten Hallman	(Czechoslovakia) Vlastimil Válek	Report
8	June 16	(United Kingdom) British Grand Prix	Shrubland Park	(Sweden) Torsten Hallman	(Sweden) Torsten Hallman	(Sweden) Torsten Hallman	Report
9	June 30	(Sweden) Swedish Grand Prix	Vännäs	(Sweden) Torsten Hallman	(Sweden) Torsten Hallman	(Sweden) Torsten Hallman	Report
10	July 7	(Finland) Finnish Grand Prix	Vantaa	(Sweden) Torsten Hallman	(Sweden) Torsten Hallman	(Sweden) Torsten Hallman	Report
11	July 14	(Soviet Union) Russian Grand Prix	Moscow	(Czechoslovakia) Vlastimil Válek	(Sweden) Torsten Hallman	(Czechoslovakia) Vlastimil Válek	Report
12	July 21	(Poland) Polish Grand Prix	Kielce	(Czechoslovakia) Vlastimil Válek	(Czechoslovakia) Karel Pilař	(Czechoslovakia) Vlastimil Válek	Report
13	July 27	(Czechoslovakia) Czechoslovak Grand Prix	Holice	(Czechoslovakia) Vlastimil Válek	(Czechoslovakia) Vlastimil Válek	(Czechoslovakia) Vlastimil Válek	Report
14	August 4	(East Germany) East German Grand Prix	Apolda	(East Germany) Paul Friedrichs	(Czechoslovakia) Vlastimil Válek	(Czechoslovakia) Karel Pilař	Report

== Final standings ==
Points are awarded to the top 6 classified finishers. For the final 500cc championship standings, half of the competitors' results + 1 are retained. Thus with 12 500cc Grand Prix, the 7 best results are retained. For the final 250cc championship standings, the 7 best results are retained.

Position	1st	2nd	3rd	4th	5th	6th
Points	8	6	4	3	2	1

=== 500cc ===
(Results in italics indicate overall winner)

Pos	Rider	Machine	AUT (Austria)		CH (Switzerland)		DEN (Denmark)		NED (Netherlands)		FRA (France)		ITA (Italy)		TCH (Czechoslovakia)		USSR (Soviet Union)		UK (United Kingdom)		BEL (Belgium)		LUX (Luxembourg)		GDR (East Germany)		Pts
Pos	Rider	Machine	R1	R2	R1	R2	R1	R2	R1	R2	R1	R2	R1	R2	R1	R2	R1	R2	R1	R2	R1	R2	R1	R2	R1	R2	Pts
1	(Sweden) Rolf Tibblin	Husqvarna	1	4	2	7	2	2	2	1	1	1	1	1	2	1	3	2	2	-	1	1	4	-	-	-	52
2	(Sweden) Sten Lundin	Lito	3	1	3	1	3	4	4	3	5	6	2	2	3	3	-	-	-	-	2	2	3	2	2	3	48
3	(United Kingdom) Jeff Smith	BSA	8	6	4	2	1	1	1	2	3	2	NC	NC	9	4	5	4	1	2	3	3	6	4	1	1	44
4	(Sweden) Per Olaf Persson	Husqvarna	6	5	6	4	8	6	7	4	10	10	4	4	-	-	2	-	-	-	8	6	9	1	3	2	20
5	(United Kingdom) Arthur Lampkin	BSA	12	9	-	-	4	5	8	10	12	34	5	3	5	9	4	5	3	3	7	-	8	5	-	-	18
6	(Sweden) Bill Nilsson	BSA	2	2	1	3	10	3	3	-	4	4	-	-	-	-	-	-	-	-	-	-	-	-	-	-	17
7	(Sweden) Ove Lundell	Monark	7	-	-	-	-	-	6	5	-	-	3	14	6	-	1	1	-	-	4	4	1	-	-	-	13
8	(United Kingdom) John Burton	BSA	11	3	-	-	-	-	-	-	14	21	7	5	13	6	-	-	17	-	11	15	5	3	-	-	9
9	(Czechoslovakia) Vlastimil Válek	ČZ	-	-	-	-	-	-	-	-	-	-	-	-	1	2	-	-	-	-	-	-	-	-	-	-	6
10	(Czechoslovakia) Ervín Krajčovič	ESO	-	-	-	-	-	-	-	-	-	-	-	-	8	5	6	3	-	-	-	-	-	-	6	6	5
11	(United Kingdom) Derek Rickman	Triumph-Métisse	-	-	-	-	-	-	-	-	-	-	-	-	-	-	-	-	4	4	-	-	-	-	-	-	4
12	(France) André Chuchard	Triumph	-	-	-	-	-	-	-	-	2	5	-	-	-	-	-	-	-	-	-	-	-	-	-	-	4
13	(Denmark) Mogens Rasmussen	Matchless	-	-	-	-	-	-	8	-	-	-	-	-	-	-	-	-	7	5	-	-	-	-	-	-	3
14	(Czechoslovakia) Karel Pilař	ČZ	-	-	-	-	-	-	-	-	-	-	-	-	4	7	-	-	-	-	-	-	-	-	-	-	3
15	(Czechoslovakia) Josef Hřebeček	ESO	-	-	-	-	-	-	-	-	-	-	-	-	-	-	-	-	-	-	-	-	-	-	4	4	3
16	(Netherlands) Nic Jansen	Matchless-Métisse	-	-	-	-	-	-	-	-	-	-	-	-	-	-	-	-	-	-	5	5	7	7	-	-	3
17	(East Germany) Heinz Krech	ESO	-	-	-	-	-	-	-	-	-	-	-	-	-	-	-	-	-	-	-	-	-	-	5	5	2
18	(United Kingdom) Chris Horsfield	Matchless	-	-	-	-	-	-	-	-	-	-	-	-	-	-	-	-	6	7	-	-	-	-	-	-	2
19	(Soviet Union) Antonin Klavinsh	ESO	4	7	-	-	-	-	-	-	-	-	-	-	-	-	-	-	-	-	-	-	-	-	7	8	2
20	(Belgium) Hubert Scaillet	Triumph-Métisse	-	-	5	5	-	-	-	-	8	3	NC	NC	-	-	-	-	-	-	6	-	2	-	-	-	2
21	(Netherlands) Broer Dirkx	Lito	10	23	-	-	-	-	5	6	-	-	-	-	-	-	-	-	-	-	-	-	17	-	-	-	1
22	(Soviet Union) Igor Kazakov	ESO	-	-	-	-	-	-	-	-	-	-	-	-	-	-	-	6	-	-	-	-	-	-	17	17	5
23	(Italy) Emilio Ostorero	Husqvarna	-	-	8	6	-	-	-	-	11	29	6	8	-	-	-	-	-	-	-	-	-	-	-	-	1
24	(Belgium) Walter Baeten	Jawa	-	-	-	-	-	-	-	-	-	-	-	-	-	-	-	-	8	6	-	-	-	-	-	-	1
-	(Germany) Fritz Betzelbacher	Maico	-	-	-	-	-	-	-	-	6	7	-	-	-	-	-	-	-	-	-	-	-	-	-	-	0
-	(United Kingdom) Don Rickman	Triumph-Métisse	-	-	-	-	-	-	-	-	-	-	-	-	-	-	-	-	-	1	-	-	-	-	-	-	0
-	(United Kingdom) Vic Eastwood	Matchless	-	-	-	-	-	-	9	-	13	33	NC	6	-	-	-	-	5	-	-	-	-	-	-	-	0

=== 250cc ===
(Results in italics indicate overall winner)

Pos	Rider	Machine	ESP (Spain)		ITA (Italy)		FRA (France)		CH (Switzerland)		GER (Germany)		LUX (Luxembourg)		NED (Netherlands)		UK (United Kingdom)		SWE (Sweden)		FIN (Finland)		USSR (Soviet Union)		POL (Poland)		TCH (Czechoslovakia)		GDR (East Germany)		Pts
Pos	Rider	Machine	R1	R2	R1	R2	R1	R2	R1	R2	R1	R2	R1	R2	R1	R2	R1	R2	R1	R2	R1	R2	R1	R2	R1	R2	R1	R2	R1	R2	Pts
1	(Sweden) Torsten Hallman	Husqvarna	2	1	1	1	1	1	1	1	1	1	1	1	7	1	1	1	1	1	1	1	-	1	-	-	2	2	-	-	56
2	(Czechoslovakia) Vlastimil Válek	ČZ	-	-	-	-	3	2	2	-	2	2	2	2	1	2	2	3	-	-	2	2	1	3	1	2	1	1	-	1	50
3	(Soviet Union) Igor Grigoriev	ČZ	-	-	-	-	-	-	3	2	-	-	9	6	5	3	-	-	-	-	4	5	2	4	2	3	7	5	2	3	32
4	(Czechoslovakia) Karel Pilař	ČZ	-	-	-	-	8	7	-	-	4	5	3	7	3	7	8	4	-	-	5	-	5	2	11	1	4	6	3	2	24
5	(Sweden) Jan Johansson	Lindstrom	6	5	3	4	31	32	-	-	-	-	6	-	2	4	5	7	5	3	-	-	7	5	-	-	3	4	-	-	21
6	(Sweden) Cenneth Loof	Greeves	-	-	5	-	4	10	-	-	-	-	4	4	8	-	4	5	4	2	-	-	-	-	-	-	-	-	-	-	13
7	(United Kingdom) Dave Bickers	Greeves	1	2	-	-	-	-	-	-	3	6	5	-	-	-	-	-	-	-	-	-	-	-	-	-	-	-	-	-	12
8	(United Kingdom) Alan Clough	Greeves	21	4	2	2	2	4	4	-	10	-	-	-	-	-	-	-	8	10	-	-	-	-	-	-	-	-	-	-	10
9	(Sweden) Olle Pettersson	Husqvarna	-	-	-	-	6	6	-	-	6	4	-	-	-	-	-	-	3	5	-	-	-	-	-	-	-	-	-	-	6
10	(Sweden) Arne Kring	Husqvarna	-	-	-	-	-	-	-	-	-	-	-	-	-	-	-	-	2	4	-	-	-	-	-	-	-	-	-	-	6
11	(Finland) Pentti Kalteva	Husqvarna	-	-	-	-	16	26	13	5	-	-	-	-	9	-	-	-	-	-	3	-	-	-	3	4	9	-	-	-	5
12	(Netherlands) Fritz Selling	Greeves	-	-	7	6	10	5	10	4	12	13	13	-	4	5	-	-	-	-	-	-	-	-	-	-	-	-	16	15	5
13	(United Kingdom) John Banks	Dot	10	13	-	-	9	28	8	3	-	-	-	13	-	-	3	-	-	-	-	-	-	-	-	-	-	-	-	-	4
14	(West Germany) Christoph Specht	Maico	3	6	-	-	32	8	-	-	13	-	-	-	-	-	-	10	-	-	-	-	-	-	-	-	-	7	-	-	4
14	(East Germany) Paul Friedrichs	ČZ	-	-	-	-	-	-	-	-	-	-	-	-	-	-	-	-	18	-	-	-	3	-	-	-	-	-	1	5	4
14	(West Germany) Fritz Betzelbacher	Maico	-	-	4	3	-	-	-	-	-	3	-	-	-	-	-	-	-	-	-	-	-	-	-	-	-	-	-	-	4
14	(United Kingdom) Don Rickman	Bultaco-Métisse	19	3	-	-	-	-	-	-	-	-	-	-	-	-	7	2	-	-	-	-	-	-	-	-	-	-	-	-	4
14	(Czechoslovakia) Zdeněk Polánka	ČZ	-	-	-	-	-	-	-	-	5	10	-	-	-	-	-	-	-	-	-	-	-	-	-	-	6	9	4	4	4
14	(East Germany) Fred Willamowski	MZ	-	-	-	-	-	-	-	-	-	-	-	-	-	-	-	-	12	14	-	-	6	6	-	-	-	-	5	7	4
20	(Soviet Union) Victor Arbekov	ČZ	-	-	-	-	-	-	-	-	-	-	-	-	-	-	-	-	-	-	-	6	4	7	-	-	-	-	-	-	3
20	(United Kingdom) John Griffith	Dot	4	-	-	5	5	3	5	-	-	-	-	3	-	-	6	-	-	-	-	-	-	-	-	-	-	-	-	-	3
20	(Soviet Union) Vladimir Gorulko	ČZ	-	-	-	-	-	-	-	-	-	-	-	-	-	-	-	-	-	-	-	-	-	-	4	5	-	-	-	-	3
20	(Finland) Raimo Rein	Husqvarna	-	-	-	-	-	-	-	-	-	-	-	-	-	-	-	-	20	8	6	4	-	-	-	-	-	-	-	-	3
20	(Czechoslovakia) Petr Dobrý	Jawa	-	-	-	-	-	-	-	-	-	-	-	-	-	-	-	-	-	-	-	-	-	-	-	-	5	3	-	-	3
25	(United Kingdom) Chris Horsfield	James	-	-	-	-	-	-	6	9	11	-	-	-	-	-	-	-	-	-	-	-	-	-	-	-	-	-	-	-	2
25	(Italy) Emilio Ostorero	Husqvarna	-	-	6	7	-	-	-	-	-	-	-	-	-	-	-	-	-	-	-	-	-	-	-	-	-	-	-	-	2
25	(Switzerland) Ulrich Gerster	Greeves	-	-	-	-	-	-	-	-	-	-	20	9	-	-	-	-	-	-	-	-	-	-	5	7	-	-	-	-	2
25	(Belgium) Joël Robert	Greeves	9	8	9	10	-	-	-	-	17	7	-	-	-	-	-	8	-	-	-	-	-	-	-	-	-	-	-	-	2
25	(Sweden) Sivert Eriksson	Greeves	-	-	-	-	-	-	14	6	9	12	8	5	-	-	-	6	9	15	-	-	-	-	-	-	-	-	-	-	2
30	(Spain) Oriol Puig Bulto	Bultaco	8	9	-	-	17	13	-	-	-	-	-	-	-	-	-	-	-	-	-	-	-	-	-	-	-	-	-	-	1
30	(Finland) Jussi Norrena	Husqvarna	-	-	-	-	-	-	-	-	-	-	-	-	-	-	-	-	-	-	-	-	-	-	-	-	-	-	-	-	1
30	(Sweden) Lars Olsson	Greeves	-	-	-	-	-	-	-	-	-	-	-	-	-	-	-	-	6	6	-	-	-	-	-	-	-	-	-	-	1
30	(East Germany) Ernst Wolff	MZ	-	-	-	-	-	-	-	-	-	-	-	-	-	-	-	-	-	-	-	-	-	-	-	-	8	8	7	6	1
-	(Finland) Aarno Erola	Montesa	-	-	-	-	-	-	-	-	-	-	-	-	-	-	-	-	-	-	-	3	-	-	-	-	-	-	-	-	0
