= 1971 Inter-AMA motocross series =

International motocross series

The 1971 Inter-AMA motocross series was an international racing series established by the American Motorcyclist Association as a pilot event to help establish motocross in the United States. The six-round series replaced the previous Inter-AM Motocross Series promoted by the American distributor for Husqvarna Motorcycles Edison Dye. The motocross series was an invitational based on a 250cc engine displacement formula, run on American tracks featuring some of the top competitors from the Motocross World Championships racing against the top American riders.

ČZ factory team rider Vlastimil Válek won 4 out of 6 races to finish the series as the overall winner ahead of second place Dave Bickers (ČZ). The third-place finisher, Gunnar Lindström (Husqvarna), was born in Sweden but was residing in the United States; therefore, he was given the First American title; however, Gary Jones (Yamaha) was the top American-born rider. As the AMA Motocross Championship would not be established until 1972, Jones was crowned the U.S. 250 Motocross National Champion, based upon being the highest placed American born rider in the series.

== 1971 Inter-AMA rounds ==
Round	Date	Location	Overall Winner	Top American
1	27 June	Castaic, California	(Czech Republic) Vlastimil Válek	Tom Rapp
2	4 July	Denver, Colorado	(United States) James Wicks	James Wicks
3	11 July	Houston, Texas	(Czech Republic) Vlastimil Válek	Gunnar Lindström
4	18 July	Orlando, Florida	(Czech Republic) Vlastimil Válek	Gunnar Lindström
5	25 July	Linnville, Ohio	(United Kingdom) Dave Bickers	Mark Blackwell
6	1 August	New Berlin, New York	(Czech Republic) Vlastimil Válek	Peter Lamppu

== 1971 Inter-AMA final standings ==
Pos	Rider	Machine	1	2	3	4	5	6	Pts
1	(Czech Republic) Vlastimil Válek	ČZ	1	4	1	1	6	1	1,430
2	(United Kingdom) Dave Bickers	ČZ	3		5	6	1	2	1,170
3	(United States) Gunnar Lindström	Husqvarna	2	9	4	3	4	5	1,060
4	(Sweden) Jan-Erik Sallqvist	Husqvarna	5	3	2	2			1,052
5	(Sweden) Keith Franzen	Husqvarna	6	2	3	5	2	6	969
6	(United Kingdom) Chris Horsfield	ČZ		7	7	7	8	4	596
7	(United States) Gary Jones	Yamaha	9	6	6	10		8	458
8	(Sweden) Christer Lindblom	Husqvarna	7		10	8	7		414
9	(United States) Jimmy Weinert	Maico				4	5		380
10	(United States) James Wicks	Maico		1					375
11	(United States) Mark Blackwell	Husqvarna					3		344
12	(United States) Peter Lamppu	Montesa					10	3	325
13	(Belgium) Jos DeWit	Husqvarna				9		7	290
14	(United States) Jim West	Husqvarna			9			9	287
15	(United States) Bill Silverthorn	Husqvarna	10	10	8				279
16	(United States) Gary Meyers	Husqvarna		5				10	265
17	(United States) Tom Rapp	Bultaco	4						224
18	(Belgium) Willie Dassen	Husqvarna							178
19	(United States) Barry Higgins	ČZ		8					159
20	(United States) Wyman Priddy	Husqvarna					9		119

== See also ==
- List of Trans-AMA motocross champions
- 1971 FIM Motocross World Championship
- 1971 Trans-AMA motocross series
