= 1966 FIM Motocross World Championship =

Motocross championship season

- Organizer: FIM
- Duration: 27 March/2 October
- Number of races: 29
- Number of manufacturers: 9

Champions
- 500cc: (East Germany) Paul Friedrichs
- 250cc: (Sweden) Torsten Hallman

FIM Motocross World Championship
- ← 1965 1967 →

The 1966 Motocross World Championship was the 10th edition of the Motocross World Championship organized by the FIM and reserved for 500cc and 250cc motorcycles.

== Summary ==
ČZ factory-supported rider Paul Friedrichs dominated the 500cc displacement class by winning seven out of fourteen Grand Prix events, defeating former World Champion Rolf Tibblin and the defending World Champion Jeff Smith. Friedrichs' victory marked the first time a motorcycle powered by a two-stroke engine had won the premier 500cc division since the inception of the Motocross World Championships in 1957. Former two-time World Champion Sten Lundin made his final World Championship appearance with a third place at the 1966 500cc Luxembourg Grand Prix.

In an effort to keep pace with the rapid developments in two-stroke engine technology, the BSA factory racing team constructed a new BSA Victor motorcycle for Smith, which utilized a four-stroke engine cradled in an ultra-lightweight, titanium motorcycle frame. Unfortunately, the titanium frame was too brittle and broke regularly during competitions. Smith won the Finnish Grand Prix, but the 1966 season marked the end of the first four-stroke era in motocross competition. Two-stroke engines would dominate off-road motorcycle racing until 2003, when mounting government environmental regulations caused the FIM to implement new rules favoring environmentally friendlier four-stroke engines.

In the 250cc division, defending champion Victor Arbekov started the season with three consecutive victories, but was injured at the second round in France and didn't recover until later in the season. Torsten Hallman and Joël Robert traded wins back and forth in a season-long battle for the championship that wasn't decided until the final race, when Hallman finally prevailed over Robert to clinch his third 250cc World Championship. Åke Jonsson won the 250cc Luxembourg Grand Prix for the first overall victory of his career.

== Grands Prix ==
=== 500cc ===
Round	Date	Grand Prix	Location	Race 1 Winner	Race 2 Winner	Overall Winner	Report
1	April 17	(Switzerland) Swiss Grand Prix	Payerne	(East Germany) Paul Friedrichs	(East Germany) Paul Friedrichs	(East Germany) Paul Friedrichs	Report
2	April 24	(Austria) Austrian Grand Prix	Sittendorf	(Sweden) Rolf Tibblin	(East Germany) Paul Friedrichs	(East Germany) Paul Friedrichs	Report
3	May 1	(Italy) Italian Grand Prix	Maggiora	(East Germany) Paul Friedrichs	(East Germany) Paul Friedrichs	(East Germany) Paul Friedrichs	Report
4	May 8	(Denmark) Danish Grand Prix	Randers	(Sweden) Rolf Tibblin	(United Kingdom) Jeff Smith	(Sweden) Rolf Tibblin	Report
5	May 15	(Sweden) Swedish Grand Prix	Hedemora	(Sweden) Bengt Aberg	(United Kingdom) Jeff Smith	(Sweden) Jan Johansson	Report
6	May 22	(Finland) Finnish Grand Prix	Ruskeasanta	(Sweden) Gunnar Johansson	(United Kingdom) Jeff Smith	(United Kingdom) Jeff Smith	Report
7	June 12	(East Germany) East German Grand Prix	Gumpelstadt	(East Germany) Paul Friedrichs	(East Germany) Paul Friedrichs	(East Germany) Paul Friedrichs	Report
8	June 19	(Czechoslovakia) Czechoslovak Grand Prix	Přerov	(East Germany) Paul Friedrichs	(East Germany) Paul Friedrichs	(East Germany) Paul Friedrichs	Report
9	June 26	(Soviet Union) Russian Grand Prix	Chișinău	(East Germany) Paul Friedrichs	(East Germany) Paul Friedrichs	(East Germany) Paul Friedrichs	Report
10	July 3	(United Kingdom) British Grand Prix	Farleigh Castle	(United Kingdom) Don Rickman	(United Kingdom) Jeff Smith	(United Kingdom) Don Rickman	Report
11	July 24	(Netherlands) Dutch Grand Prix	Lichtenvoorde	(Sweden) Rolf Tibblin	(Sweden) Rolf Tibblin	(Sweden) Rolf Tibblin	Report
12	August 7	(Belgium) Belgian Grand Prix	Namur	(United Kingdom) Vic Eastwood	(Belgium) Roger De Coster	(United Kingdom) Arthur Lampkin	Report
13	August 14	Luxembourg Grand Prix	Ettelbruck	(East Germany) Paul Friedrichs	(Sweden) Jan Johansson	(East Germany) Paul Friedrichs	Report
14	August 21	(West Germany) West German Grand Prix	Beuren	(Czechoslovakia) Vlastimil Válek	(United Kingdom) Dave Bickers	(Soviet Union) Victor Arbekov	Report

=== 250cc ===
Round	Date	Grand Prix	Location	Race 1 Winner	Race 2 Winner	Overall Winner	Report
1	March 27	(Spain) Spanish Grand Prix	Sabadell	(Soviet Union) Victor Arbekov	(Soviet Union) Victor Arbekov	(Soviet Union) Victor Arbekov	Report
2	April 10	(France) French Grand Prix	Pernes-les-Fontaines	(Soviet Union) Victor Arbekov	(Sweden) Torsten Hallman	(Sweden) Torsten Hallman	Report
3	April 24	(Belgium) Belgian Grand Prix	Mont Kemmel	(Sweden) Torsten Hallman	(Belgium) Joël Robert	(Sweden) Torsten Hallman	Report
4	May 1	(Switzerland) Swiss Grand Prix	Broc	(Czechoslovakia) Petr Dobrý	(Belgium) Joël Robert	(Belgium) Joël Robert	Report
5	May 8	(Czechoslovakia) Czechoslovak Grand Prix	Holice	(Czechoslovakia) Petr Dobrý	(Belgium) Joël Robert	(Sweden) Torsten Hallman	Report
6	May 15	(West Germany) West German Grand Prix	Bielstein	(Belgium) Joël Robert	(Sweden) Torsten Hallman	(Belgium) Joël Robert	Report
7	May 22	(Netherlands) Dutch Grand Prix	Markelo	(Sweden) Torsten Hallman	(Sweden) Ake Tornblom	(Belgium) Joël Robert	Report
8	June 5	Luxembourg Grand Prix	Schifflange	(Soviet Union) Victor Arbekov	(Sweden) Åke Jonsson	(Sweden) Åke Jonsson	Report
9	June 12	(Italy) Italian Grand Prix	Cingoli	(Sweden) Torsten Hallman	(Sweden) Torsten Hallman	(Sweden) Torsten Hallman	Report
10	June 19	(Poland) Polish Grand Prix	Szczecin	(Belgium) Joël Robert	(Belgium) Joël Robert	(Belgium) Joël Robert	Report
11	July 3	(East Germany) East German Grand Prix	Apolda	(Belgium) Joël Robert	(Czechoslovakia) Petr Dobrý	(Czechoslovakia) Petr Dobrý	Report
12	July 24	(Sweden) Swedish Grand Prix	Motala	(Sweden) Jan Blomqvist	(Sweden) Åke Jonsson	(Sweden) Torsten Hallman	Report
13	July 31	(Finland) Finnish Grand Prix	Hyvinkää	(Sweden) Olle Pettersson	(Sweden) Olle Pettersson	(Sweden) Olle Pettersson	Report
14	August 7	(Soviet Union) Russian Grand Prix	Leningrad	(Soviet Union) Victor Arbekov	(Soviet Union) Victor Arbekov	(Soviet Union) Victor Arbekov	Report
15	October 2	(Austria) Austrian Grand Prix	Murau	(Czechoslovakia) Petr Dobrý	(Soviet Union) Victor Arbekov	(Czechoslovakia) Petr Dobrý	Report

== Final standings ==
Points are awarded to the top 6 classified finishers. For the 500cc final championship standings, the 8 best of 14 results are retained. For the 250cc final championship standings, the 8 best of 15 results are retained.

Position	1st	2nd	3rd	4th	5th	6th
Points	8	6	4	3	2	1

=== 500cc ===
(Results in italics indicate overall winner)

Pos	Rider	Machine	CH (Switzerland)		AUT (Austria)		ITA (Italy)		DEN (Denmark)		SWE (Sweden)		FIN (Finland)		DDR (East Germany)		TCH (Czechoslovakia)		USSR (Soviet Union)		UK (United Kingdom)		NED (Netherlands)		BEL (Belgium)		LUX (Luxembourg)		GER (West Germany)		Points
Pos	Rider	Machine	R1	R2	R1	R2	R1	R2	R1	R2	R1	R2	R1	R2	R1	R2	R1	R2	R1	R2	R1	R2	R1	R2	R1	R2	R1	R2	R1	R2	
1	(East Germany) Paul Friedrichs	ČZ	1	1	2	1	1	1	2	4	5	-	3	3	1	1	1	1	1	1	-	-	-	-	11	3	1	2	-	-	62
2	(Sweden) Rolf Tibblin	ČZ	2	3	1	2	5	4	1	2	4	-	5	5	3	4	5	2	6	8	8	8	1	1	3	4	8	7	-	-	40
3	(United Kingdom) Jeff Smith	BSA	-	8	5	7	2	2	-	1	18	1	2	1	2	5	4	4	3	2	2	1	5	-	-	-	-	-	-	-	37
4	(Czechoslovakia) Vlastimil Válek	ČZ	3	2	4	4	4	3	-	-	6	4	6	6	4	6	2	6	2	3	3	-	4	4	6	6	5	5	1	3	34
5	(United Kingdom) Dave Bickers	ČZ	32	4	3	3	3	NC	4	5	3	-	4	4	10	9	3	3	5	4	5	5	2	2	-	-	4	8	3	1	32
6	(Sweden) Jan Johansson	Lindstrom	-	-	-	6	-	-	-	-	2	2	10	7	6	11	-	-	-	-	6	6	10	3	-	-	6	1	-	-	18
7	(Soviet Union) Igor Grigoriev	ČZ	9	9	11	5	8	7	7	-	7	9	7	9	8	3	-	-	-	-	-	-	15	8	12	13	-	-	-	-	9
8	(United Kingdom) Don Rickman	Triumph-Métisse	-	-	-	-	-	-	-	-	-	-	-	-	-	-	-	-	-	-	1	2	-	-	-	-	-	-	-	-	8
8	(United Kingdom) Arthur Lampkin	BSA	-	-	-	-	-	-	-	-	-	-	-	-	-	-	-	-	-	-	11	11	-	-	2	2	-	-	-	-	8
8	(Soviet Union) Victor Arbekov	ČZ	-	-	-	-	-	-	-	-	-	-	-	-	-	-	-	-	-	-	-	-	-	-	-	-	-	-	2	2	8
8	(United Kingdom) Chris Horsfield	ČZ	11	5	10	-	11	12	5	-	-	-	-	-	-	-	-	-	-	-	4	4	6	6	-	-	-	-	-	-	8
12	(Sweden) Bengt Åberg	Triumph-Métisse	-	11	-	-	-	-	-	-	1	3	-	-	-	-	-	-	-	-	-	-	-	-	19	-	-	-	-	-	6
12	(Sweden) Gunnar Johansson	ČZ	-	-	-	-	-	-	-	-	12	-	1	2	-	-	-	-	-	-	-	-	3	-	13	-	9	-	-	-	6
12	(Belgium) Roger De Coster	ČZ	-	-	-	-	-	-	-	-	-	-	-	-	-	-	-	-	-	-	-	-	-	-	5	1	-	-	-	-	6
12	(United Kingdom) Vic Eastwood	BSA	4	-	-	-	NC	8	-	-	-	7	17	-	-	2	-	-	4	-	7	3	9	-	1	5	10	-	-	5	6
16	(Sweden) Bill Nilsson	Husqvarna	-	-	18	12	-	-	-	-	-	5	14	-	-	-	-	-	-	-	-	-	-	-	-	-	7	3	4	7	5
17	(Belgium) Sylvain Geboers	Lindstrom	10	15	13	11	NC	-	3	3	-	6	-	-	-	-	-	-	-	-	16	-	7	-	8	-	-	-	-	-	4
17	(Sweden) Sten Lundin	Lito	16	12	9	-	-	-	-	-	-	-	-	-	-	-	-	-	-	-	-	-	-	-	-	-	3	6	-	-	4
19	(East Germany) Joachim Helmhold	ČZ	5	6	-	-	-	-	-	-	9	-	11	10	7	12	6	-	-	-	-	-	-	-	16	11	13	10	-	-	3
19	(West Germany) Adolf Weil	Maico	-	-	-	-	-	-	-	-	-	-	-	-	-	-	-	-	-	-	-	-	-	-	-	-	-	-	5	4	3
19	(Czechoslovakia) Josef Hřebeček	ČZ	8	7	16	10	10	NC	-	-	-	-	-	-	-	-	10	-	13	9	-	-	-	-	14	14	2	9	-	-	3
19	(Soviet Union) Yuri Matveev	ČZ	6	-	7	-	6	6	-	-	-	-	9	8	-	-	-	-	-	-	-	-	-	9	-	-	-	-	6	-	3
19	(Soviet Union) Sigurd Kalkis	ČZ	12	10	12	8	14	5	-	6	-	-	8	-	-	-	-	-	7	5	-	-	-	-	-	-	-	-	-	-	3
24	(Sweden) Erik Malmgren	Hedlund	-	-	-	-	-	-	-	-	8	8	-	-	-	-	-	-	-	-	-	-	-	-	-	-	-	-	-	-	2
24	(Soviet Union) Vladimir Pogrebniak	ČZ	13	20	6	13	12	NC	-	-	-	-	12	15	-	-	-	-	-	-	-	-	13	10	4	7	-	-	-	-	2
26	(Czechoslovakia) Zdeněk Polanka	ČZ	7	14	8	9	7	9	-	-	-	-	-	-	-	-	7	9	11	11	-	-	-	-	9	10	-	4	8	-	1
26	(Denmark) Mogens Rasmussen	Métisse-Matchless	-	-	-	-	-	-	6	-	-	-	-	-	-	-	-	-	-	-	9	7	11	5	-	-	-	-	-	-	1
-	(Czechoslovakia) Jan Brabec	ČZ	-	-	-	-	-	-	-	-	-	-	-	-	5	15	-	-	9	6	-	-	-	-	-	-	-	-	9	-	0
-	(West Germany) Fritz Betzelbacher	Montesa	-	-	-	-	-	-	-	-	-	-	-	-	-	-	-	-	-	-	-	-	-	-	-	-	-	-	-	6	0

=== 250cc ===
Pos	Rider	Machine	ESP (Spain)		FRA (France)		BEL (Belgium)		CH (Switzerland)		TCH (Czechoslovakia)		GER (West Germany)		NED (Netherlands)		LUX (Luxembourg)		ITA (Italy)		POL (Poland)		GDR (East Germany)		SWE (Sweden)		FIN (Finland)		USSR (Soviet Union)		AUT (Austria)		Pts
Pos	Rider	Machine	R1	R2	R1	R2	R1	R2	R1	R2	R1	R2	R1	R2	R1	R2	R1	R2	R1	R2	R1	R2	R1	R2	R1	R2	R1	R2	R1	R2	R1	R2	
1	(Sweden) Torsten Hallman	Husqvarna	3	2	2	1	1	3	3	3	2	2	3	1	1	-	-	-	1	1	2	2	4	-	2	2	3	3	-	-	2	4	58
2	(Belgium) Joël Robert	ČZ	-	-	3	2	10	1	2	1	-	1	1	2	2	2	-	7	3	-	1	1	1	-	-	-	11	-	3	2	5	2	49
3	(Czechoslovakia) Petr Dobrý	ČZ	-	-	4	3	21	-	1	2	1	3	-	-	-	-	4	2	2	-	-	-	2	1	15	7	5	-	2	-	1	3	40
4	(Soviet Union) Victor Arbekov	ČZ	1	1	1	NC	11	-	-	-	3	7	2	3	-	-	1	-	-	-	4	-	3	2	9	-	14	10	1	1	3	1	36
5	(Sweden) Olle Pettersson	Husqvarna	-	3	5	5	3	2	-	-	5	6	6	-	10	3	-	-	5	3	-	5	6	4	8	3	1	1	4	-	4	7	29
6	(Sweden) Åke Jonsson	Husqvarna	-	-	-	-	-	-	4	5	-	-	4	4	-	-	3	1	-	-	3	3	-	-	4	1	6	2	-	-	-	-	28
7	(Belgium) Roger De Coster	ČZ	-	-	7	4	2	6	6	7	8	-	5	5	-	13	2	6	6	2	5	4	-	-	-	-	-	-	-	-	-	-	23
8	(Soviet Union) Gunnar Draougs	ČZ	21	-	NC	NC	11	10	5	10	-	4	7	9	4	4	-	-	-	-	-	-	5	5	-	-	9	7	-	-	-	-	10
9	(Sweden) Åke Tornblom	ČZ	11	-	9	12	-	-	-	-	-	5	-	-	3	1	8	-	-	-	-	6	-	-	7	-	12	-	-	-	-	-	8
10	(Czechoslovakia) Ivan Poláš	ČZ	-	-	8	NC	-	-	12	4	-	-	13	6	-	8	11	8	-	6	-	-	7	3	21	8	15	6	6	3	6	5	8
11	(West Germany) Fritz Betzelbacher	Montesa	5	6	-	-	-	-	11	6	-	-	-	-	9	7	-	-	-	-	-	-	-	-	-	-	-	-	-	-	-	-	5
12	(United Kingdom) Don Rickman	Bultaco	2	4	-	-	-	-	-	-	-	-	-	-	-	-	-	-	-	-	-	-	-	-	-	-	-	-	-	-	-	-	4
12	(Italy) Lanfranco Angelini	ČZ	-	-	-	-	-	-	-	-	-	-	-	-	-	-	-	-	4	4	-	-	-	-	-	-	-	-	-	-	-	-	4
12	(Sweden) Jan Blomqvist	Husqvarna	-	-	-	-	-	-	-	-	-	-	-	-	-	-	-	-	-	-	-	-	-	-	1	4	-	-	-	-	-	-	4
12	(Finland) Jyrki Storm	Husqvarna	-	-	23	11	16	7	-	-	7	10	-	-	-	-	-	-	-	-	6	-	-	-	-	-	2	-	-	4	-	-	4
12	(Belgium) Marcel Wiertz	Bultaco	26	16	10	NC	6	5	-	-	-	-	8	-	16	-	7	3	-	-	-	-	-	-	-	-	-	-	-	-	-	-	4
12	(East Germany) Fred Willamowski	ČZ	-	-	NC	17	-	-	-	-	-	-	-	-	6	6	-	-	-	-	-	-	-	6	-	-	-	-	-	-	-	-	4
18	(Sweden) Håkan Jerling	Husqvarna	-	-	-	-	-	-	-	-	-	-	-	-	-	-	-	-	-	-	-	-	-	-	5	5	-	-	-	-	-	-	3
18	(Finland) Kalevi Vehkonen	Husqvarna	-	-	-	-	-	-	-	-	-	-	-	-	-	-	-	-	-	-	-	-	-	-	-	-	4	8	-	-	-	-	3
18	(Netherlands) Jo Lammers	Husqvarna	-	-	-	-	5	4	-	-	-	-	-	7	7	-	-	-	-	-	-	-	-	-	-	-	-	-	-	-	-	-	3
18	(France) Jacky Porte	Montesa	-	-	6	6	-	-	-	-	-	-	-	-	13	11	6	5	-	-	-	-	-	-	-	-	-	-	-	-	-	-	3
18	(Czechoslovakia) Zdeněk Strnad	ČZ	-	-	-	-	4	-	-	-	9	8	-	-	8	-	5	9	-	5	-	-	8	15	-	-	-	-	-	-	7	6	3
23	(Spain) Oriol Puig Bulto	Bultaco	6	5	16	14	-	-	-	-	-	-	-	-	-	-	-	-	-	-	-	-	-	-	-	-	-	-	-	-	-	-	2
23	(Finland) Jaakko Lehmuskoski	Husqvarna	-	-	14	10	-	-	-	-	-	-	-	-	-	-	-	-	-	-	-	-	-	-	-	-	7	5	-	-	-	-	2
23	(Soviet Union) Andrei Dezhinov	ČZ	-	-	-	-	-	-	-	-	-	-	-	-	-	-	15	12	-	-	-	-	-	-	-	-	-	-	5	-	-	-	2
26	(Spain) Pedro Pi Parera	Montesa	7	10	12	16	-	-	-	-	-	-	-	-	-	-	-	-	-	-	-	-	-	-	-	-	-	-	-	-	-	-	1
26	(United Kingdom) Malcolm Davis	Bultaco	-	-	-	-	-	-	-	-	-	-	-	-	-	-	9	4	-	-	-	-	-	-	-	-	-	-	-	-	-	-	1
26	(Sweden) Bengt Arne Bonn	Husqvarna	-	-	-	-	-	-	-	-	-	-	-	-	-	-	-	-	-	-	-	-	-	-	6	10	-	-	-	-	-	-	1
26	(Finland) Jorma Jarvinen	Husqvarna	22	9	-	-	-	-	-	-	-	-	-	-	-	-	-	-	-	-	-	-	-	-	-	-	8	4	-	-	-	-	1
26	(Norway) Tore Lundby	Husqvarna	-	-	-	-	-	-	-	-	-	-	-	-	-	-	-	-	-	-	-	-	-	-	-	-	23	-	-	6	-	-	1
-	(United Kingdom) Alan Clough	Greeves	-	-	NC	NC	-	-	-	-	4	-	-	-	-	24	-	13	10	-	-	-	-	-	-	-	-	-	-	-	-	-	0
-	(Sweden) Håkan Andersson	Husqvarna	-	-	-	-	-	-	-	-	-	-	-	-	-	-	-	-	-	-	-	-	-	-	3	-	-	-	-	-	-	-	0
-	(Netherlands) Pierre Karsmakers	ČZ	-	-	-	-	-	-	-	-	-	-	-	-	5	-	-	-	-	-	-	-	-	-	-	-	-	-	-	-	-	-	0
-	(West Germany) Adolf Weil	Montesa	-	15	-	-	-	-	-	-	-	-	-	-	11	-	-	-	-	-	-	-	-	-	-	-	-	-	-	-	-	-	0
-	(Finland) Heikki Mikkola	Husqvarna	-	-	-	-	-	-	-	-	-	-	-	-	-	-	-	-	-	-	-	-	-	-	-	-	13	-	-	-	-	-	0
