= Victor Arbekov =

Russian motocross racer (1943–2017)

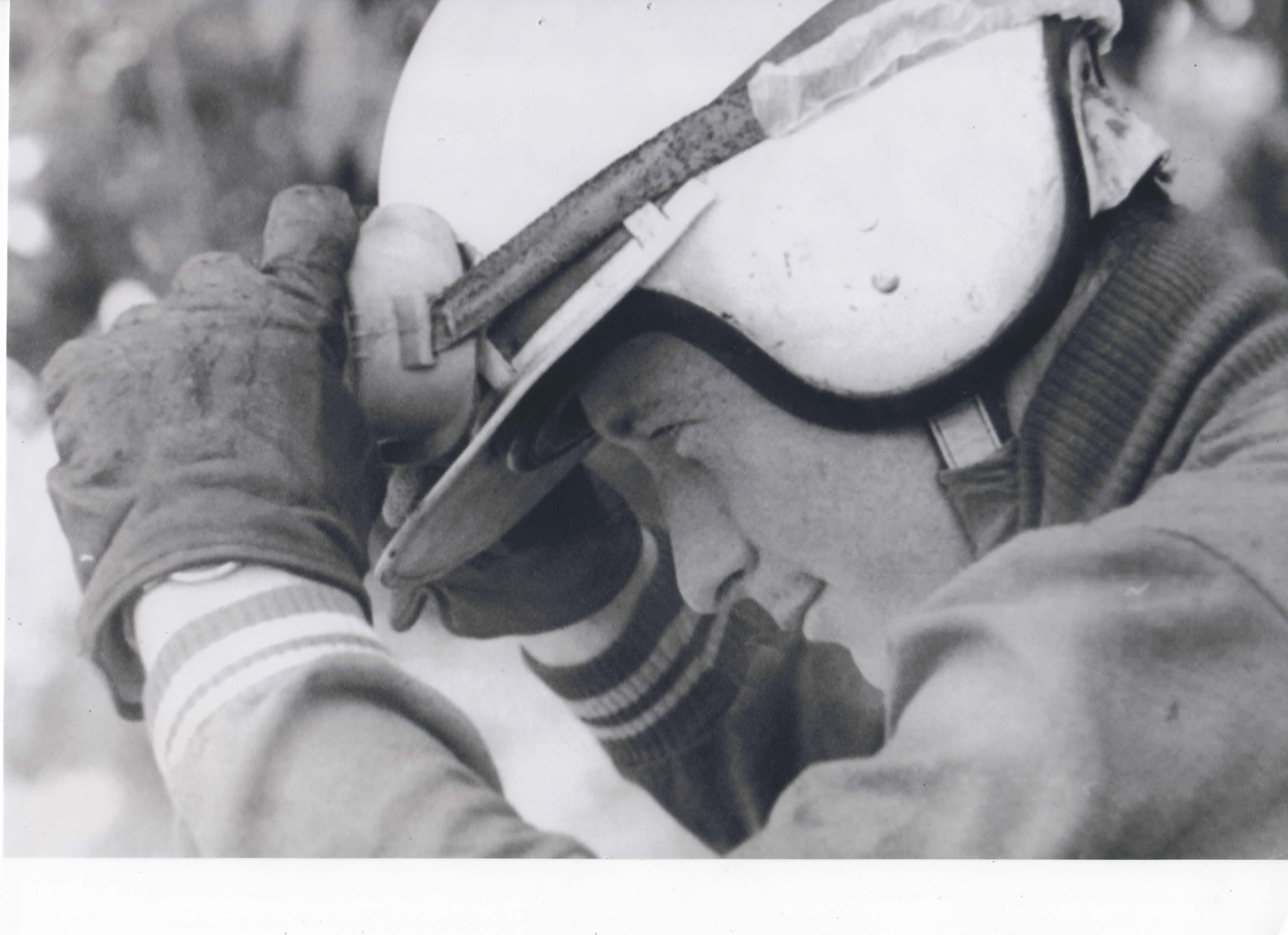
- Victor Arbekov
- Nationality: Russian
- Born: 8 March 1943 Podolsk, Soviet Union
- Died: 18 February 2017 (aged 73) Moscow, Russia

Motocross career
- Years active: 1963 - 1968
- Teams: ČZ
- Championships: 250cc - 1965
- Wins: 10

Victor Mikhailovich Arbekov (8 March 1943 – 18 February 2017) was a Russian Grand Prix motocross racer. He competed in the FIM Motocross World Championships from 1963 to 1968. Arbekov is notable for being the first Russian competitor to win a Motocross World Championship.

== Biography ==
Arbekov was born on 8 March 1943 in Podolsk, a city in Moscow Oblast. He began racing motorcycles in 1956 riding a homemade 125 cc motorcycle. At the age of 17 he won the Soviet championship in the 125 class and successfully defended his title the following year. In 1962, at the age of 19, he was drafted into the Russian Army and placed on the Russian Army Motocross Team.

At the age of 21, Arbekov scored the first Motocross World Championship points of his career at the 1963 250cc Russian Grand Prix aboard a ČZ motorcycle. He won the first overall victory of his career at the 1964 250cc East German Grand Prix and finished the season in third place behind Joël Robert and two-time World Champion Torsten Hallman.

Robert was considered the fastest motocross racer in the world going into the 1965 season but his lackadaisical attitude towards physical fitness training and voracious appetite meant that he didn't always live up to expectations. Although Robert won three Grand Prix races in 1965, his World Championship title defense was marred by crashes, mechanical failures and minor injuries. Hallman was completing his senior year in college in 1965 and the heavy workload meant he had to reduce his racing schedule. Arbekov filled the void left by his two main rivals by winning five Grand Prix races, securing the 1965 World Championship ahead of his nearest challenger, Robert, at the penultimate round in Sweden.

Arbekov began the 1966 season with a victory at the 250cc Spanish Grand Prix, however he was injured in a serious crash at the second round in France and did not return to health until the 14th round in Russia where he won both heat races. He ended the season in fourth place as Hallman returned from having completed his college degree to win his third World Championship. Arbekov was the top individual points scorer at the 1966 Motocross des Nations event held at Remalard, France. He repeated his season-opening victory in 1967 by winning the 250cc Spanish Grand Prix but the season was once again dominated by Hallman and Robert as, Arbekov finished the World Championship in fourth place for the second consecutive year.

Arbekov's victory at the 1967 250cc Spanish Grand Prix marked the final win of his motocross racing career. He competed in his final World Championship race at the 1968 250cc Luxembourg Grand Prix at the age of 26. It was thought that Soviet authorities believed that Arbekov was becoming too westernized and subsequently banned him from foreign travel.

== Career overview ==
Arbekov won 21 individual heat races and 10 Grand Prix victories during his world championship racing career. He won the 1965 250cc World Championship as well as 14 Soviet national titles. Arbekov was a member of two Russian Motocross des Nations teams (1966-1967) and three Trophée des Nations teams (1964-1965, 1967).

From 1964 to 1978, Arbekov served as a riding instructor and from 1978 to 1984 he was the Motocross Coach for the CSKA Moscow Sports Club. He retired as a Lieutenant Colonel in 1992. Arbekov was awarded the honorary title of Honored Master of Sports. He was said to be battling cancer when he fell out of a high-rise apartment building window in Moscow on 18 February 2017 and died at the age of 74.

== Motocross Grand Prix Results ==
Points system from 1952 to 1968:

Position	1st	2nd	3rd	4th	5th	6th
Points	8	6	4	3	2	1

Year	Class	Team	1		2		3		4		5		6		7		8		9		10		11		12		13		14		15		Pos	Pts
Year	Class	Team	R1	R2	R1	R2	R1	R2	R1	R2	R1	R2	R1	R2	R1	R2	R1	R2	R1	R2	R1	R2	R1	R2	R1	R2	R1	R2	R1	R2	R1	R2	Pos	Pts
1963	250cc	ČZ	ESP -	ESP -	ITA -	ITA -	FRA -	FRA -	CH -	CH -	GER -	GER -	LUX; 10	LUX; 10	NED -	NED -	UK -	UK -	SWE -	SWE -	FIN -	FIN; 6	USR; 4	USR; 4	POL -	POL -	CZE -	CZE -	GDR -	GDR -			20th	3
1964	250cc	ČZ	ESP -	ESP -	BEL -	BEL -	CH; 5	CH; 4	CZE; 5	CZE; 4	GER -	GER -	LUX; 5	LUX; 4	ITA; 8	ITA; 7	UK -	UK -	SWE; 6	SWE; 6	FIN; 3	FIN; 3	USR; 3	USR; 1	POL; 1	POL -	GDR; 2	GDR; 3	FRA; 6	FRA -			3rd	31
1965	250cc	ČZ	ESP; 2	ESP; 9	ITA; 1	ITA; 2	FRA; 2	FRA; 1	BEL -	BEL -	CZE -	CZE -	GER; 1	GER; 1	NED; 1	NED; 1	LUX; 2	LUX; 2	POL; 1	POL; 2	USR; 1	USR; 18	GDR -	GDR -	UK -	UK -	SWE; 1	SWE; 2	FIN -	FIN -	AUT -	AUT -	1st	52
1966	250cc	ČZ	ESP; 1	ESP; 1	FRA; 1	FRA -	BEL; 11	BEL -	CH -	CH -	CZE; 3	CZE; 7	GER; 2	GER; 3	NED -	NED -	LUX; 1	LUX -	ITA -	ITA -	POL; 4	POL -	GDR; 3	GDR; 2	SWE; 9	SWE -	FIN; 14	FIN; 10	USR; 1	USR; 1	AUT; 3	AUT; 1	4th	36
1966	500cc	ČZ	CH -	CH -	AUT -	AUT -	ITA -	ITA -	DEN -	DEN -	SWE -	SWE -	FIN -	FIN -	GDR -	GDR -	CZE -	CZE -	URS -	URS -	UK -	UK -	NED -	NED -	BEL -	BEL -	LUX -	LUX -	GER; 2	GER; 2			8th	8
1967	250cc	ČZ	ESP; 1	ESP; 1	CH; 4	CH; 8	FRA; 5	FRA; 4	BEL; 13	BEL -	GER; 1	GER -	NED; 3	NED; 2	ITA -	ITA -	UK; 2	UK; 4	SWE -	SWE -	FIN -	FIN -	USR; 3	USR -	POL -	POL -							4th	25
1968	250cc	ČZ	ESP -	ESP -	BEL; 9	BEL; 4	CZE; 3	CZE; 3	FRA; 8	FRA; 5	NED; 11	NED; 27	GER; 6	GER; 4	LUX; 7	LUX -	POL -	POL -	USR -	USR -	YUG -	YUG -	FIN -	FIN -	SWE -	SWE -	UK -	UK -	AUT -	AUT -			9th	8
