= Ove Lundell =

Swedish motorcycle racer (1930–2001)

- Nationality: Swedish
- Born: 29 May 1930 Möklinta, Sweden
- Died: 4 September 2001 (aged 71) Varberg, Sweden

Motocross career
- Years active: 1958 - 1965
- Teams: Monark
- Wins: 1

Ove Vilmer Lundell (29 May 1930 – 4 September 2001) was a Swedish professional motocross racer. He competed in the Motocross World Championships from 1958 to 1965. Lundell was one of the top off-road motorcyclists of his era coming from Sweden, a nation that produced many of the sport's first world champions.

== Motorcycle racing career ==
Lundell was born in Möklinta outside Sala in the county of Västmanland, Sweden. His career began at the age of fifteen, when he performed at Swedish circuses where he rode Wall of Death carnival sideshows on an old Indian motorcycle.

Lundell worked during the 1950s and 1960s as a rider for the Monark factory racing team. Monark was a large Swedish bicycle and motorcycle manufacturer that was also involved in construction and development. Lundell won his first and only motocross world championship race on 30 June, 1963 at the 500cc Russian Grand Prix.

Lundell won six individual heat races and one Grand Prix victory during his world championship racing career. He won three 500cc Swedish Motocross Championships (1955, 1958, 1960) and was named a member of the Swedish Motocross des Nations team 10 times (1956-1965). Lundell took part in three Swedish Motocross des Nations victories (1958, 1961, 1962).

Lundell was also successful in a variety other events, such as road racing, enduro, and Snowmobile races. Lundell won Gold Medals at the 1954 and 1956 International Six Days Trial and won the Swedish enduro national championship riding Monark motorcycles.

== Later life ==
After retiring from competitive racing, Lundell operated a service station and cafe near the Monark factory before returning to work for Monark as the head of their competition department. He was responsible for designing a successful range of 125cc Monark enduro and street-scrambler models.

During the late 1960s and early 1970s, Lundell was a highly regarded coach for young Swedish motorcycle riders, based at Anneberg Motocross Track outside Varberg on the Swedish west coast. From the mid-1970s to the early 1980s, he worked in Manaus, Brazil helping develop a Monark moped for that country. He returned to Sweden and in 1984, he started racing again, taking part in many National and International vintage racing events with great success. He died of cancer in Varberg in the county of Halland, Sweden.
