= Emilio Ostorero =

Italian motocross racer and rally driver (1934–2023)

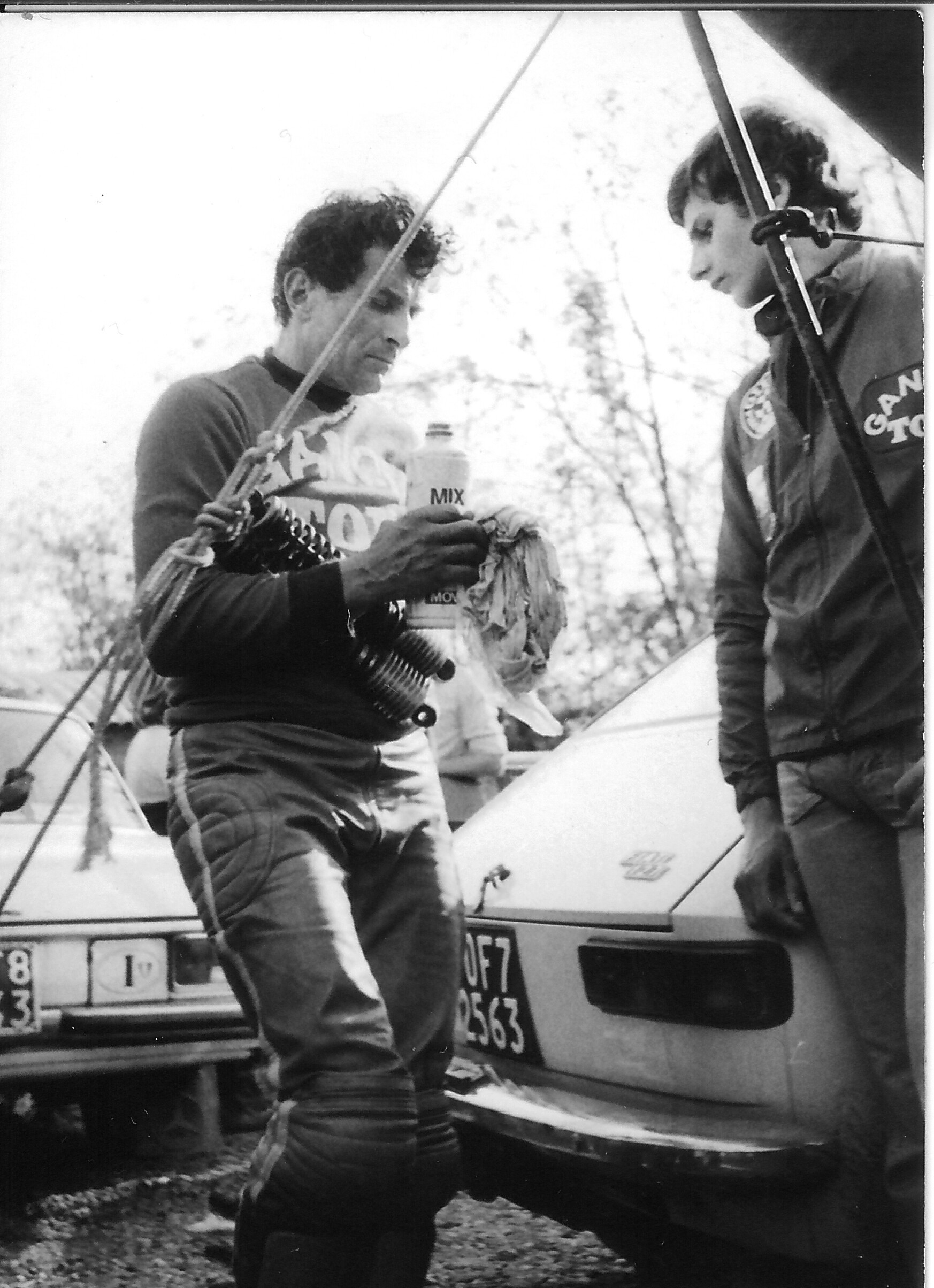
- Ostorero at the Casale Monferrato GP (Italian Motocross Championship, 1970)
- Nationality: Italian
- Born: 23 November 1934 Avigliana, Italy
- Died: 21 July 2023 (aged 88) Turin, Italy

Motocross career
- Years active: 1958–1960
- Teams: Bianchi
- Wins: 1

Emilio Ostorero (23 November 1934 – 21 July 2023) was an Italian professional motocross racer and rally driver. He competed in the FIM Motocross World Championships between 1958 and 1960. Ostorero was nicknamed "Leone di Avigliana" ('Lion of Avigliana').

== Life and career ==
The son of a sailor, Ostorero was a motorbike enthusiast from an early age, and before starting his competitive career he worked as a mechanic at the Alpino motorbike company in Stradella. He started his professional career in 1952 in the 175cc class, and in 1956 he won his first Italian Motocross Championship title in the 250cc class. In 1957, he won the national titles both in the 250cc and in the 500cc classes.

Ostorero won a total of 16 national titles between 1956 and 1970. In the 1960 Motocross World Championship, he became the first Italian to win an international Grand Prix when he rode a Bianchi motorcycle to defeat Jeff Smith (BSA) and Torsten Hallman (Husqvarna) and won the 250cc Italian Grand Prix.

After his retirement in 1976, Ostorero took part in several rally raid events, notably placing sixth at the 1984 Rallye des Pharaons with a Honda XL 600 R. The same year, he received the title of Commendatore of the Italian Republic. He also served as the Italian technical commissioner at the Motocross des Nations for 12 years. He died on 21 July 2023, at the age of 88.
