= Pierre Karsmakers =

Dutch motorcycle racer

- Nationality: Dutch
- Born: August 11, 1946 (age 80) Waalre, Netherlands

Motocross career
- Years active: 1966-1979
- Teams: Yamaha, Honda
- Championships: AMA 500 cc- 1973; AMA 250SX- 1974; AMA Four-Stroke National Champion- 1980
- Wins: AMA- 23; FIM- 1

Pierre Karsmakers (born 11 August 1946) is a Dutch former professional motocross racer. He competed in the FIM Motocross World Championships from 1966 to 1972 and the AMA Motocross Championships from 1973 to 1978, most prominently as a member of the Yamaha factory racing team where won the 1973 500 cc AMA National Championship.

Karsmakers became the first European motocross racer to compete in the AMA National Championships during a period when European racers dominated the sport. As the sport of motocross had yet to fully develop in the United States, he was credited with helping to improve the level of competition in American motocross. Karsmakers showed American motocross racers how to train properly and prepare their motocycles for racing. He was inducted into the AMA Motorcycle Hall of Fame in 2014.

== Motocross racing career ==
=== Early career ===
Karsmakers was born on 11 August 1946 in Waalre, the Netherlands where he grew up in a family of 6 brothers and 2 sisters. Five of the brothers competed in motocross racing. He was coached by his uncle Frans Baudoin, a former Dutch Motocross National Champion. Karsmakers began racing in 1964 riding a Greeves motorcycle and within 2 years had attained his professional racing license. At the age of 20, he won the 500 cc Dutch Motocross Championship and scored his first Motocross World Championship points at the 1967 250 cc Belgian Grand Prix riding a ČZ motorcycle. He won his second 500 cc Dutch Motocross Championship in 1969 and earned the first podium result of his career with a third place at the 1969 250 cc Dutch Grand Prix behind Sylvain Geboers (ČZ) and Olle Pettersson (Suzuki).

After the 1971 world championships, Karsmakers traveled to the United States to compete in the 1971 Trans-AMA motocross series. The Trans-AMA series was an international series established by the American Motorcyclist Association as a pilot event to help establish motocross in the United States. He finished the series ranked ninth overall. He won his third 500 cc Dutch Motocross Championship in 1972 and returned to compete in the 1972 Trans-AMA motocross series where he finished the series in 8th place on a Husqvarna motorcycle.

=== AMA racing ===
While Karsmakers was in the United States competing in the 1972 Trans-AMA series, the Yamaha factory offered him a lucrative contract to compete in the AMA 500 cc National Championship. The sport of motocross experienced explosive growth in 1973 and motorcycle manufacturers sought to capitalize on the expanding market with all four Japanese manufacturers fielding factory-backed teams alongside their European counterparts. In the early 1970s, European competitors dominated international motocross racing as the sport was just beginning to take root in the United States. 1973 marked only the second season of the AMA Motocross National Championship and Yamaha wanted a European motocross racer to show American competitors how to train and prepare their motorcycles.

At the age of 26, Karsmakers moved to the United States to join the Yamaha USA racing team as Tim Hart's teammate. He began the year by winning the pre-season Winter-AMA Motocross Series in Florida. He then dominated the 500 cc AMA National Championship, winning seven of 12 AMA Nationals and claimed 17 victories in 36 races overall. Riders competing for the AMA national championship continued to accumulate points counting towards the national championship while they competed in the 1973 Trans-AMA motocross series. Although Karsmakers was a Dutch citizen, he was competing under an AMA license so, he was controversially named the "Top American" finisher after placing fourth in the 1973 Trans-AMA series.

=== The Karsmakers rule ===
Karsmakers success in the AMA championship created enmity among some American motocross racers who felt that Karsmakers' European racing experience gave him an unfair advantage in the United States where the sport of motocross was just beginning to gain popularity. Karsmakers felt that he held no blame for being faster than the American riders.

The AMA responded to the controversy surrounding Karsmakers by implementing a new rule for the 1974 season stating that foreign riders must reside in the United States for at least two years before they were eligible to earn points in the American national championships. Despite the resentful reactions of some of his competitors, by serving as a rabbit for the less experienced American racers, Karsmakers helped to improve the level of competition in American professional motocross.

Karsmakers chose to compete in the 1974 250 cc AMA National Championship despite not be registered in the points standings. He won three of the nine 250 cc rounds, earning what would have been the most championship points, but Gary Jones (Can-Am) was awarded the title. Karsmakers also won the inaugural 250 cc AMA AMA Supercross Championship in 1974 to become the first AMA Supercross Champion in history.

The AMA would rescind the rule for the 1975 season, allowing Karsmakers to once again compete for the AMA championship.

=== Move to Honda ===
In the wake of the 1973 oil crisis, sales of recreational vehicles decreased significantly, and Yamaha was forced to reduce their competition budget after the 1974 season. When Yamaha offered him a reduced salary for the 1975 season, Karsmakers accepted a contract to ride for the American Honda team in the 500 cc class. He won the second round in Mexico, New York and went into the final race of the season in New Orleans as one of five competitors with a mathematical chance to win the title. A collision with Tony DiStefano (Suzuki) dropped him from contention and relegated him to third place in the final points standings behind Jimmy Weinert (Yamaha) and Steve Stackable (Maico).

Karsmakers entered the 1975 500 cc United States Motocross Grand Prix held at the Carlsbad Raceway where he scored a second-place finish behind Gerrit Wolsink (Suzuki) in the second heat race. One week later at the 500 cc Canadian Grand Prix, he scored his first overall victory in a World Championship Grand Prix race. The victory also marked the first overall Motocross World Championship Grand Prix victory for the Honda factory.

=== Return to Yamaha ===
After two seasons with the Honda team, Karsmakers returned to the Yamaha team for the 1976 season, but by then he was 31-years-old and injuries began to take a toll on his body. Karsmakers won the final AMA National of his career at St. Peters, Missouri, on July 18, 1976. His last AMA championship race was a sixth place at the 1978 500 cc High Point National. He returned to Europe and entered his final World Championship race at the 1979 250 cc Dutch Grand Prix. He retired from competitive motocross in December 1979, at the age of 34. He briefly came out of retirement to win the 1980 AMA Four-Stroke National Championship held at Carlsbad Raceway.

== Career overview ==
Karsmakers won one World Championship Grand Prix race and 23 AMA National races during his motocross racing career. His 1974 Daytona Supercross win marked the only supercross victory of his career. He was also a three-time Dutch motocross national champion (1967, 1969, 1972). Karsmakers was a member of six Dutch teams at the Motocross des Nations (1966, 1967, 1969, 1970-1972) and four Trophée des Nations teams (1966, 1969, 1970).

== Later life ==
After his professional motocross career, Karsmakers returned to the Netherlands where he opened a Honda franchise and became a successful entrepreneur by importing American parts and accessories for motorcycles into Europe. He also imported BMX bicycles and accessories and became a promoter of BMX racing activities in the Netherlands.

Karsmakers became interested in competing in rally raid events, entering the grueling, long distance 1987 Paris–Dakar Rally where he finished 10th overall in the motorcycle division. He has competed in a total of 11 Dakar rallies, seven on a motorcycle. Karsmakers was recognized for his influential role in the development of American motocross in 2014 when, he was inducted into the AMA Motorcycle Hall of Fame.

== Motocross Grand Prix Results ==
Points system from 1952 to 1968:

Position	1st	2nd	3rd	4th	5th	6th
Points	8	6	4	3	2	1

Points system from 1969 to 1980:

Position	1	2	3	4	5	6	7	8	9	10
Points	15	12	10	8	6	5	4	3	2	1

Year	Class	Team	1		2		3		4		5		6		7		8		9		10		11		12		13		14		15		Pos	Pts
Year	Class	Team	R1	R2	R1	R2	R1	R2	R1	R2	R1	R2	R1	R2	R1	R2	R1	R2	R1	R2	R1	R2	R1	R2	R1	R2	R1	R2	R1	R2	R1	R2	Pos	Pts
1966	250cc	ČZ	ESP -	ESP -	FRA -	FRA -	BEL -	BEL -	CH -	CH -	CZE -	CZE -	GER -	GER -	NED; 5	NED -	LUX -	LUX -	ITA -	ITA -	POL -	POL -	GDR -	GDR -	SWE -	SWE -	FIN -	FIN -	USR -	USR -	AUT -	AUT -	-	0
1967	500cc	ČZ	AUT -	AUT -	ITA -	ITA -	SWE -	SWE -	CZE -	CZE; 6	URS -	URS -	FRA -	FRA -	GER -	GER -	UK -	UK -	BEL; 4	BEL; 14	LUX; 15	LUX; 13	CH -	CH -									20th	1
1968	500cc	ČZ	AUT -	AUT -	ITA -	ITA -	SWE -	SWE -	FIN -	FIN -	GDR -	GDR -	CZE -	CZE -	UK -	UK -	GER -	GER -	FRA; 8	FRA; 9	NED; 7	NED; 6	BEL; 13	BEL; 14	LUX -	LUX -	CH -	CH -					19th	3
1969	250cc	ČZ	ESP -	ESP -	CH -	CH -	YUG -	YUG -	CZE -	CZE -	POL -	POL -	GER -	GER -	NED; 3	NED; 4	FRA -	FRA -	UK -	UK -	SWE -	SWE -	FIN -	FIN -	USR -	USR -							22nd	10
1970	500cc	ČZ	CH -	CH; 10	AUT -	AUT -	NED; 12	NED; 7	FRA; 15	FRA -	FIN -	FIN -	SWE -	SWE -	CZE; 12	CZE; 14	USR -	USR -	GER -	GER -	GDR -	GDR -	BEL -	BEL -	LUX -	LUX -							34th	2
1972	500cc	Husqvarna	AUT -	AUT -	CH -	CH; 8	SWE -	SWE -	FRA -	FRA -	USR -	USR -	CZE; 6	CZE -	UK -	UK -	GER; 10	GER -	GDR -	GDR -	BEL; 9	BEL; 7	LUX -	LUX -									18th	7
1973	500cc	Yamaha	FRA -	FRA -	AUT -	AUT -	FIN -	FIN -	ITA -	ITA -	CZE -	CZE -	USA; 7	USA; 9	GER -	GER -	BEL -	BEL -	LUX -	LUX -	NED -	NED -											26th	6
1974	500cc	Yamaha	AUT -	AUT -	FRA -	FRA -	ITA -	ITA -	DEN -	DEN -	CZE -	CZE -	GER -	GER -	UK -	UK -	USA; 6	USA; 4	NED -	NED -	BEL -	BEL -	LUX -	LUX -									14th	13
1975	500cc	Honda	CH -	CH -	ITA -	ITA -	FIN -	FIN -	USR -	USR -	FRA -	FRA -	USA; 10	USA; 2	CAN; 2	CAN; 2	UK -	UK; 4	GER -	GER -	NED -	NED -	BEL -	BEL -	LUX -	LUX -							10th	45
1976	500cc	Honda	CH; 2	CH -	FRA; 6	FRA -	ITA -	ITA; 1	AUT -	AUT; 3	SWE -	SWE; 3	FIN -	FIN; 9	GER -	GER -	USA -	USA; 2	CAN; 6	CAN -	UK -	UK; 10	BEL -	BEL -	LUX -	LUX -							9th	72
1977	500cc	Yamaha	AUT; 2	AUT -	NED; 6	NED; 9	SWE -	SWE -	FIN; 8	FIN; 4	GER -	GER -	ITA -	ITA -	USA -	USA -	CAN -	CAN -	UK -	UK -	BEL -	BEL -	LUX -	LUX -	CH -	CH -							12th	30
1979	250cc	Yamaha	ESP -	ESP -	NED; 7	NED -	ITA -	ITA -	BEL -	BEL -	YUG -	YUG -	CZE -	CZE -	POL -	POL -	FRA -	FRA -	FIN -	FIN -	USA -	USA -	GER -	GER -	BUL -	BUL -							32nd	4
