= Marty Tripes =

American motorcycle racer

- Nationality: American
- Born: June 29, 1956 (age 70) San Diego, California, U.S.

Motocross career
- Years active: 1972 - 1980
- Teams: Yamaha, Honda, Husqvarna, Can-Am, Bultaco, Harley-Davidson
- Wins: 11

Marty Tripes (born June 29, 1956) is an American former professional motocross racer. He competed in the AMA Motocross Championships from 1972 to 1980. He was one of the leading American motocross and supercross racers during the 1970s. Tripes rose to national prominence in 1972 as a teenage prodigy when he defeated some of the best riders in the world to win the first-ever stadium supercross race in the United States.

Tripes was described as being one of the most naturally talented riders of his era with a smooth and stylish stand-up riding technique. It is also notable that Tripes was successful despite being one of the biggest riders of his era, at 6’-1” tall and weighing over 200 pounds in his racing prime. Tripes was inducted into the AMA Motorcycle Hall of Fame in 2001.

== Motocross career ==
Tripes was born in San Diego, California and began riding bicycles during the era that spawned BMX racing. As a child, he watched one of the first motocross races in America which featured the top European riders of the era. The riding ability of the European riders greatly impressed Tripes and he sought to emulate their style, especially that of his idol Joel Robert. He rode 100cc Penton Berkshire before moving on to a succession of ČZs. By 1971 he was riding a Montesa, and had won the Mammoth Mountain Motocross.

Tripes made an impression as a 14-year-old prodigy in the 1971 Denver Inter-AMA race where he scored an impressive fourth-place finish against some of the best motocross racers in the world. However, when the AMA discovered his real age, he was banned from competition until his 16th birthday. He was then contracted to ride for the Yamaha factory racing team managed by Don Jones, father of future national champion and teammate Gary Jones.

Tripes rose to national prominence in July 1972 just after his 16th birthday when, he scored an unexpected victory for Yamaha in the inaugural Super Bowl of Motocross in the Los Angeles Coliseum. The race is considered to be the first true stadium Supercross race in America. His surprising victory in what was officially the second professional race of his career, came at a time when European riders dominated the sport, and it was considered a significant accomplishment for an American rider to finish among the top five against the more experienced European competitors.

Tripes became the youngest rider to win an AMA national as he rode to three second-place finishes to earn the overall victory against some of the world's best riders including former world champions Torsten Hallman and Dave Bickers as well as future world champion Håkan Andersson. His performances in the final two races where, he had to work his way through the field after bad starts, thrilled the spectators in attendance. His Super Bowl victory created a huge wave of excitement in the American motorcycle community. He then left the Yamaha team to ride a ČZ in the 1972 Trans-AMA motocross series where he was the top-scoring American rider in the series-ending race, defeating top American riders such as Brad Lackey, Jim Pomeroy and Gary Jones.

Tripes was then contracted to ride for the Honda factory racing team in the 1973 250cc national championship. He successfully defended his Super Bowl of Motocross victory and won two races in the 250cc national championship to end the season ranked sixth in the nation.

After only one year with the Honda team, Tripes joined the Husqvarna team where he struggled to compete on a motorcycle that lagged behind the performance of the Japanese motorcycles. Nevertheless, Tripes managed to win one race along with three second places to finish the year ranked second in the 1974 250cc national championship. In a marketing move, Tripes was hired by the Can-Am team before the final race of the season so that the team with their riders Gary Jones, Tripes and Jimmy Ellis, would claim the top three positions in the national championship.

Tripes signed a contract to race for the Bultaco racing team in 1975, but was discouraged by the results and decided to take a year off to enjoy life. He had developed a reputation for his lackadaisical work ethic, as well as a reputation for not getting along with his teammates. In the first four years of his professional motocross career, Tripes had already ridden for five different factory racing teams. Despite the great physical effort involved in motocross racing, Tripes never performed any physical training to prepare for racing, relying solely on his natural riding ability. After his impressive victory at the 1972 Super Bowl of Motocross, he seldom lived up to his potential. He returned to race in 1977 for the ill-fated Harley-Davidson motocross team, but they ended their motocross racing program after only one season.

If nobody had been allowed to train and just relied on raw talent, Marty Tripes would have won every race.

— AMA Hall of Famer Bob Hannah

Tripes decided to get serious about his physical training and nutrition in 1978. He returned to the American Honda factory racing team in 1978 where he had the most successful season of his career. Tripes won the first FIM 250cc United States Motocross Grand Prix at Unadilla, New York in 1978, defeating some of the best riders in the world including the defending 250cc World Champion, Guennady Moisseev and 1979 250cc World Champion, Håkan Carlqvist.

During an era of American motocross that was dominated by Bob Hannah, Tripes was one of the few riders who was able to compete evenly with Hannah. Hannah’s only other real defeat in the 1978 Trans-AMA Series came in the Missouri round where he engaged in an opening moto battle with Tripes, exchanging the lead numerous times until the final laps when Hannah’s front brake cable adjuster came loose, allowing Tripes to take the victory.

At the age of 23, Tripes won his final national win defeating Hannah at the 250 outdoor national held in Buchanan, Michigan, on July 1, 1979. He ended the season ranked third behind Hannah and Kent Howerton. He returned to race for the Yamaha team in 1980 and ended the year ranked eighth in AMA 250 Motocross and tenth in AMA Supercross. He retired at the end of the year at the age of 24.

In his six-year professional motocross career, Tripes won a total of 11 National Championship races. The AMA honored Tripes in 2001 by inducting him into the AMA Motorcycle Hall of Fame. After retirement from racing, Tripes became a pioneer in safety gear design in the paintball industry and currently develops ammunition for Tippmann Pneumatics. He also ran a successful gourmet mushroom business that sells to grocery chains.
