= 1974 Trans-AMA motocross series =

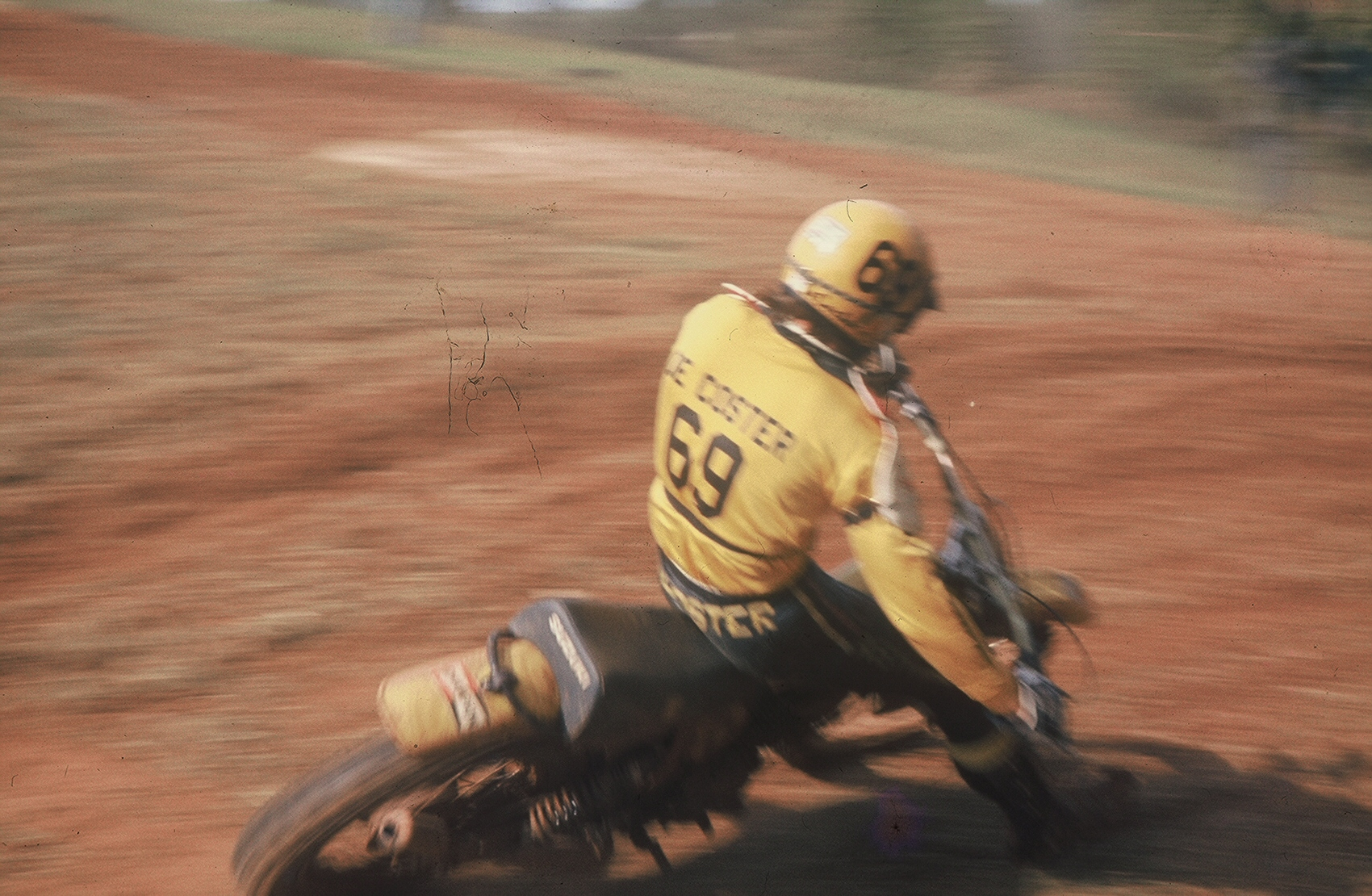
De Coster competing in the 1974 Trans-AMA motocross series

The 1974 Trans-AMA motocross series was the fifth annual international series established by the American Motorcyclist Association as a pilot event to help establish motocross in the United States. The motocross series was an invitational based on a 500cc engine displacement formula, run on American tracks featuring the top riders from the F.I.M. world championship against the top American riders.

Suzuki factory rider Roger De Coster claimed the championship with four overall victories. His Suzuki teammate, Dutchman Gerrit Wolsink took second place along with one overall victory. Maico factory rider Adolf Weil claimed third place, while the top American rider was Bultaco's Jim Pomeroy in fourth place.

== 1974 Trans-AMA rounds ==
Round	Date	Location	Race 1 Winner	Race 2 Winner	Overall Winner	Top American
1	6 October	New Berlin, New York	(Belgium) Roger De Coster	(West Germany) Adolf Weil	(Belgium) Roger De Coster	Jim Pomeroy
2	13 October	Linnville, Ohio	(Finland) Heikki Mikkola	(West Germany) Adolf Weil	(Finland) Heikki Mikkola	Jim Pomeroy
3	20 October	Gainesville, Georgia	(Belgium) Roger De Coster	(Belgium) Roger De Coster	(Belgium) Roger De Coster	Jim Pomeroy
4	27 October	Orlando, Florida	(Netherlands) Gerrit Wolsink	(Netherlands) Pierre Karsmakers	(Netherlands) Gerrit Wolsink	Brad Lackey
5	10 November	Lake Whitney, Texas	(Sweden) Åke Jonsson	(Belgium) Harry Everts	(Belgium) Roger De Coster	Steve Stackable
6	17 November	Puyallup, Washington	(Belgium) Harry Everts	(Belgium) Roger De Coster	(Belgium) Harry Everts	Rich Thorwaldson
7	24 November	Livermore, California	(Sweden) Bengt Åberg	(Belgium) Roger De Coster	(Belgium) Roger De Coster	Mike Runyard
8	1 December	Irvine, California	(Netherlands) Pierre Karsmakers	(Belgium) Roger De Coster	(Netherlands) Pierre Karsmakers	Pierre Karsmakers*
*Karsmakers, a Dutch citizen racing under an American racing license is awarded Top American status after being the Overall Winner of Round 8. Sources:

== 1974 Trans-AMA final standings ==
(Results in italics indicate overall winner)

Pos	Rider	Machine	Rnd.1		Rnd.2		Rnd.3		Rnd.4		Rnd.5		Rnd.6		Rnd.7		Rnd.8		Points
Pos	Rider	Machine	R1	R2	R1	R2	R1	R2	R1	R2	R1	R2	R1	R2	R1	R2	R1	R2	
1	(Belgium) Roger De Coster	Suzuki	1	2			1	1			2	2	5	1	6	1	3	1	900
2	(Netherlands) Gerrit Wolsink	Suzuki	3	3		2			1	3					11	7	7	4	530
3	(West Germany) Adolf Weil	Maico		1		1	2	2	16	5	8	10			16	2	4	15	415
4	(United States) Jim Pomeroy	Bultaco	2	8	3		4	3	3	22	5	20					2	3	399
5	(Belgium) Harry Everts	Puch					8	10	6	12	7	1	1	2					344
6	(West Germany) Willy Bauer	Maico					3	5	4	19	45	4	6	36	4	8	6	6	333
7	(Japan) Yukio Sugio	Yamaha					12	19	7	6	11	8	4	6	15	14	21	9	288
8	(United States) Brad Lackey	Husqvarna				4	10	6	5	9	10	12	7	37	17	6			285
9	(Sweden) Arne Kring	Husqvarna							9	4	4	9	3	19	7	12			270
10	(Netherlands) Pierre Karsmakers	Yamaha	4						32	1	6	13					1	2	233
11	(United States) Rich Thorwaldson	Suzuki			2						15	6	8	5	8	13	10	12	-
12	(United States) Mike Runyard	Suzuki					9	12	15	10	21	19	9	10	14	4	18	8	-
13	(Sweden) Bengt Åberg	Husqvarna					5	7	42	8			26	4	1	41			-
14	(Sweden) Åke Jonsson	Yamaha							42	2	1	45							-
15	(United States) Steve Stackable	Maico							20	14	9	3	23	3			8	27	-
16	(Sweden) Håkan Andersson	Yamaha		4					2	16	3	18							-
17	(West Germany) Hans Maisch	Maico					11	4							20	3	5	17	-
18	(United States) Jimmy Weinert	Kawasaki					6	13							2	42	9	22	-
19	(Finland) Heikki Mikkola	Husqvarna			1	3													-
20	(United States) Tony DiStefano	ČZ					7	9	12	13							20	18	-
21	(United States) Rex Staten	Honda					15	15					20	16	3	41	13	26	-
22	(United States) Rich Eierstedt	Honda							10	7					5	17			-
23	(United Kingdom) Vic Eastwood	CCM					20	17	14	18			10	7					-
24	(United States) Sonny DeFeo	Maico					17	22	17	20	19	16	11	13	25	16			-
25	(United Kingdom) Vic Allan	Bultaco													12	9	11	14	-
26	(United States) Gary Jones	Can-Am							23	11					24	11	15	10	-
27	(Belgium) Raymond Boven	Montesa													9	10	16	13	-
28	(United States) Mike Hartwig	Husqvarna											2	14					-
29	(United States) Gary Chaplin	Maico											12	11	18	15			-
30	(Japan) Koji Masuda	Suzuki									13	21					14	11	-
31	(United States) Tim Hart	Yamaha					16	18			20	7							-
32	(Canada) Henning Hansen	Yamaha											16	9					-
33	(United States) Bryar Holcomb	Maico					19	16			18	15							-
34	(New Zealand) Ivan Miller	Penton					13	14											-
35	(United States) Jimmy Ellis	Can-Am															33	7	-
36	(United States) Mark Blackwell	Maico					22	20					19	12					-
37	(United Kingdom) Roger Harvey	Cheney-BSA									23	23	17	17					-
38	(Canada) Bill McLean	Yamaha											21	15					-
39	(United States) Gordon Bowden	Yamaha					18	23											-
40	(Canada) Tom Kratzer	Yamaha											24	18					-
41	(United States) Wayne Boyer	Cheney-BSA													22	22			-
42	(United States) Trey Jorski	Kawasaki									22	24							-
Sources only document the points awarded to the first ten competitors. Sources:

== See also ==
- 1974 FIM Motocross World Championship
- 1974 AMA Motocross National Championship season
- List of Trans-AMA motocross champions
