= Tony DiStefano =

American motorcycle racer

- Nationality: American
- Born: February 6, 1957 (age 69) Bristol, Pennsylvania

Motocross career
- Years active: 1973 - 1981
- Teams: Suzuki, Can-Am, Husqvarna
- Championships: AMA 250cc - 1975, 1976, 1977 AMA 250cc Inter-AMA - 1975
- Wins: 16

Anthony Joseph DiStefano Jr. (born February 6, 1957) is an American former professional motocross racer. He competed in the AMA Motocross Championships from 1973 to 1981, most prominently as a member of the Suzuki factory racing team where he won three consecutive AMA 250cc Motocross National Championships. DiStefano was inducted into the AMA Motorcycle Hall of Fame in 1999.

== Motocross career ==
=== Early life ===
DiStefano was born on February 6, 1957 in Bristol, Pennsylvania where his father owned a motorcycle repair shop. He began riding minibikes by the time he was five years old. DiStefano began to compete in local motorcycle races at the age of 8 and continued to compete throughout his teenage years. He began to compete in motocross races at the age of 14, just as the sport was beginning to gain popularity in the United States.

At the time, the AMA required competitors to be 18 years old to race professionally. At the age of 16, DiStefano decided to enter the Unadilla round of the 1971 Trans-AMA motocross series using the name of an older friend. When the AMA discovered his true age, they fined him and banned him from racing until he reached the legal age of 18. Fortunately for DiStefano, the following year, the AMA lowered the legal age to 16 and he was able to procure a professional racing license. By the time he was 16, DiStefano had earned enough money from motocross racing to purchase his own van and drive himself to races.

=== AMA racing ===
In his first full year of professional racing as a 16-year-old privateer racer on a ČZ motorcycle, DiStefano drove himself to every race where he slept inside his van and performed his own motorcycle maintenance. Despite this hardship, he earned 11 top 10 finishes and finished the season ranked ninth in the 1973 500cc Motocross National Championship. At the age of 17, he decided to quit school and concentrate on his professional motocross career.

DiStefano earned the first podium result of his career with a second place behind Mike Hartwig (Yamaha) at the season opening round of the 1974 500cc Motocross National Championship. One week later, he won the first AMA National of his career in Moorpark, California. He was leading the National Championship points standings as a 17-year-old privateer when he broke his thumb while competing in a local race at Indian Dunes, California. He continued to race while wearing a cast but, his injury allowed Jimmy Weinert (Kawasaki) to overtake him to win the 1974 National Championship while DiStefano was able to salvage second place in the final standings. Although ČZ had been one of the leading motocross manufacturers of the late 1960s, by the early 1970s they had become antiquated, making DiStefano's performance all the more impressive.

At the end of the 1974 season, DiStefano along with Weinert, Brad Lackey and Jim Pomeroy were selected by the AMA to represent the United States at the Motocross des Nations event where they finished in an impressive second-place. Their performance marked the best-ever result at the time for an American team at the event, at a time when American motocross racers were still seen as less experienced than their European rivals. DiStefano competed in the 1974 Trans-AMA motocross series where he finished the series in 20th place. The Trans-AMA series was an international series established by the American Motorcyclist Association as a pilot event to help establish motocross in the United States.

A photograph taken during the 1974 season by journalist Charlie Morey showing DiStefano and Weinert battling for the race lead in a right hand turn with Weinert's handlebar just inches away from DiStefano's chin, became one of the most iconic photographs in American motocross history.

=== Suzuki team ===
DiStefano's strong performance earned him a job with the Suzuki factory motocross team for the 1975 season. His Suzuki mechanic was Keith McCarty who later worked for the Yamaha factory racing team as Bob Hannah's mechanic. McCarty himself would be inducted into the AMA Hall of Fame in 2015. Although DiStefano won only one race in the 1975 250cc Motocross National Championship, he was able to offset the three victories by Kent Howerton (Husqvarna) by finishing on the podium in all but one round to win the championship.

DiStefano also swept all three races of the 1975 Inter-AMA championship to become the second American rider after Jim Pomeroy to win an internationally sanctioned event. Suzuki had signed DiStefano to compete in the 500 class however, due to crashes, mechanical failures and minor injuries, he was not able to win a 500 class title. At the 1975 500cc United States Grand Prix held at the Carlsbad Raceway, he scored a third-place in the second heat race, just ahead of the 1974 500cc World Champion, Heikki Mikkola. In the 1975 Trans-AMA series, DiStefano was the highest-placed American rider, finishing the series in third place behind his Suzuki teammates Roger De Coster and Gerrit Wolsink.

DiStefano continued to score consistent podium results in the 1976 season to defeat Jimmy Weinert (Kawasaki) for the 250cc National Championship, despite Weinert winning three races. He won his third consecutive 250cc Motocross National Championship in 1977 by winning the final three races of the season to overtake Marty Smith (Honda). DiStefano along with Steve Stackable, Kent Howerton and Gary Semics, represented the United States at the 1977 Motocross des Nations and Trophée des Nations events. At the Motocross des Nations event for 500cc motorcycles in France, the team scored an impressive second-place finish behind the powerful Belgian team led by Roger De Coster and Jaak van Velthoven. Then one week later at the Trophée des Nations event for 250cc motorcycles in the Netherlands, the team placed fourth. In the 1977 Trans-AMA series, DiStefano placed 7th in the final standings.

On March 18, 1978, DiStefano was involved in a major first-turn crash at the Houston Astrodome with Marty Smith (Honda) and Jimmy Ellis (Honda). Smith suffered a fractured pelvis and DiStefano badly injured his knee and never fully recovered from the injury. Of the three racers, only Ellis would ever win another professional motocross race. When he was unable to defend his title, he was released by the Suzuki team after the 1978 season.

=== Later career ===
DiStefano signed a contract to race for the Can-Am team in 1979; however, their motorcycles were no longer competitive as Can-Am had stopped development work after sales of recreational vehicles had fallen in the wake of the 1973 oil crisis. After competing in six Nationals, the Can-Am team ceased racing operations at the end of the 1979 season. He then signed to ride for Mitch Payton’s Husqvarna team for the 1980 season; however, before the season began he seriously injured his eye in a home construction accident and missed the entire season. Despite being nearly blind in one eye, he made a valiant comeback attempt in 1981 riding a privateer Maico, but was unable to maintain his previous level of competition. DiStefano raced in his final AMA National at Washougal, Washington, on August 2, 1981, at the age of 24.

== Career overview ==
DiStefano won 13 AMA Nationals and 3 AMA Supercross races during his professional motocross racing career. He was a member of four American Motocross des Nations teams (1974-1977) and three Trophée des Nations teams (1975-1977). After winning his third consecutive 250cc National Championship, DiStefano was named the 1977 AMA Pro Athlete of the Year. He was inducted into the AMA Motorcycle Hall of Fame in 1999. In 2009, DiStefano was named the recipient of the Edison Dye Motocross Lifetime Achievement Award given to those individuals who made the largest impact on the growth of motocross in America.

== Motocross school ==
DiStefano continued his involvement in the sport by starting a motocross school for young riders in 1982. In 1988, while practicing at a track in New Jersey, DiStefano crashed, fractured his spinal cord and became paralyzed. After rehabilitation, he continued to teach his motocross schools from the seat of an all-terrain vehicle.
