= 1973 AMA Motocross National Championship season =

1973 AMA Motocross Championship season

Seasons
- ← 1972 1974 →

The 1973 AMA Motocross Championship season was the 2nd AMA Motocross National Championship season.

== Summary ==
The sport of motocross experienced explosive growth in 1973 and motorcycle manufacturers sought to capitalize on the expanding market with all four Japanese manufacturers fielding factory-backed teams alongside their European counterparts. Pierre Karsmakers from the Netherlands dominated the 1973 500cc national championship, winning seven of 12 AMA Nationals and claimed 17 victories in 36 races overall. Karsmakers is credited with helping raise the level of American motocross by stressing the importance of physical fitness and machine preparation. 1973 marked a turning point in American motocross when Jimmy Weinert became the first American rider to defeat the then-dominant European riders in the Trans-AMA Motocross Series at Rio Bravo MX Park in Houston Texas. His victory showed that the level of American motocross had begun to compare with the level of European motocross.

As in the 1972 season, after the season-ending 500cc race on September 9, American riders competing for the AMA national championship continued to accumulate points counting towards the national championship while they competed in the 1973 Trans-AMA motocross series, which began on September 23 and hosted visiting European riders from the Motocross World Championship. Although Karsmakers was a Dutch citizen, he was competing under an AMA license so, he was listed as the "Top American" finisher in the Trans-AMA series.

After winning the 1972 250cc national championship on a Yamaha, Gary Jones was hired by Honda to help develop their new Honda CR250M motocross bike for the 1973 season. He did so successfully to win his second consecutive 250cc national title. When Honda failed to provide Jones with a 500cc motorcycle for the 1973 Trans-AMA series, he purchased a Maico motorcycle and raced it with all the badges removed while wearing his Honda team apparel. This act provoked Honda to end their association with Jones.

== Nationals ==
=== 500cc ===
Round	Date	Location	Winner	Team	Report
1	March 10	Daytona International Speedway	(Netherlands) Pierre Karsmakers	Yamaha	Report
2	May 6	Opelousas, Louisiana	(United States) Mike Hartwig	Husqvarna	Report
3	May 13	Hialeah, Florida	(Netherlands) Pierre Karsmakers	Yamaha	Report
4	May 20	Olive Branch, Michigan	(United States) Mike Runyard	Suzuki	Report
5	June 2	Atlanta, Georgia	(Netherlands) Pierre Karsmakers	Yamaha	Report
6	June 10	Adelphi, Ohio	(Netherlands) Pierre Karsmakers	Yamaha	Report
7	June 17	Lake Whitney Ranch, Texas	(United States) Brad Lackey	Kawasaki	Report
8	August 12	Lake Whitney Ranch, Texas	(Netherlands) Pierre Karsmakers	Yamaha	Report
9	August 18	Pocono, Pennsylvania	(United States) Mike Runyard	Suzuki	Report
10	August 26	Sligo, Kentucky	(Netherlands) Pierre Karsmakers	Yamaha	Report
11	September 1	Alabama International Motor Speedway	(Netherlands) Pierre Karsmakers	Yamaha	Report
12	September 9	New Orleans, Louisiana	(United States) Brad Lackey	Kawasaki	Report

==== Trans-AMA Series ====
Round	Date	Location	Top American	Team	Report
13	September 23	Springville, New York	(Netherlands) Pierre Karsmakers	Yamaha	Report
14	September 28	Philadelphia, Pennsylvania	(Netherlands) Pierre Karsmakers	Yamaha	Report
15	October 7	Lexington, Ohio	(Netherlands) Pierre Karsmakers	Yamaha	Report
16	October 14	Washington, Indiana	(United States) Jimmy Weinert	Kawasaki	Report
17	October 21	Atlanta, Georgia	(Netherlands) Pierre Karsmakers	Yamaha	Report
18	October 28	Orlando, Florida	(United States) Brad Lackey	Kawasaki	Report
19	November 4	Houston, Texas	(United States) Jimmy Weinert	Kawasaki	Report
20	November 11	Phoenix, Arizona	(Netherlands) Pierre Karsmakers	Yamaha	Report
21	November 18	Puyallup, Washington	(Netherlands) Pierre Karsmakers	Yamaha	Report
22	November 25	Livermore, California	(United States) Rich Thorwaldson	Suzuki	Report
23	December 2	Orange, California	(Netherlands) Pierre Karsmakers	Yamaha	Report

=== 250cc ===
Round	Date	Location	Winner	Team	Report
1	March 10	Daytona International Speedway	(United States) Bob Grossi	Husqvarna	Report
2	May 6	Opelousas, Louisiana	(United States) Jimmy Weinert	Kawasaki	Report
3	May 13	Hialeah, Florida	(United States) Gary Jones	Honda	Report
4	May 20	Olive Branch, Michigan	(United States) Jimmy Weinert	Kawasaki	Report
5	June 2	Atlanta, Georgia	(United States) Marty Tripes	Honda	Report
6	June 10	Adelphi, Ohio	(United States) Gary Jones	Honda	Report
7	June 17	Lake Whitney Ranch, Texas	(United States) Gary Jones	Honda	Report
8	July 1	Tooele, Utah	(Netherlands) Pierre Karsmakers	Yamaha	Report
9	July 6	Los Angeles Memorial Coliseum	(United States) Marty Tripes	Honda	Report
10	July 15	Baldwin, Kansas	(Netherlands) Pierre Karsmakers	Yamaha	Report
11	July 22	Delta, Ohio	(United States) John DeSoto	ČZ	Report
12	July 29	Unadilla, New York	(Netherlands) Pierre Karsmakers	Yamaha	Report
13	August 12	Lake Whitney Ranch, Texas	(United States) Tim Hart	Yamaha	Report
14	August 18	Pocono, Pennsylvania	(United States) Rich Thorwaldson	Suzuki	Report
15	August 26	Sligo, Kentucky	(United States) Gary Jones	Honda	Report
16	September 1	Alabama International Motor Speedway	(United States) Gary Jones	Honda	Report
17	September 9	New Orleans, Louisiana	(United States) Gary Jones	Honda	Report

== Final standings ==
=== 500cc ===
Pos	Rider	Machine	1	2	3	4	5	6	7	8	9	10	11	12	13	14	15	16	17	18	19	20	21	22	23	Pts
1	Pierre Karsmakers	Yamaha	1	3	1		1	1	13	1	3	1	1	2	1	1	1	5	1	3	15	1	1	6	1	2,659
2	Mike Runyard	Suzuki	2	5	5	1	8	2	2	7	1	3	14	3	13		5	6	6	8	13	7	5	11	6	1,427
3	Peter Lamppu	Kawasaki		2	3	2				2	4	4	4	6	12	9	7	15		5	9	3	4	8	11	1,126
4	Gary Semics	Husqvarna	6	10	2	6	4	6	3	8	5	12	7		6	16		3	7	4	4	5	9	14	8	1,079
5	Brad Lackey	Kawasaki	3					3	1			16	10	1		17	16		5	1	11	11	8	3	3	999
6	Tim Hart	Yamaha													3	2	4	2	3	6	8	2	2	17	7	769
7	Rich Thorwaldson	Suzuki													8	6	6	8	14	7	3	4	3	1	2	888
8	Mike Hartwig	Husqvarna	4	1	15	4	7			13	8	7			2		14		2	16	6		16	15	13	756
9	Tony DiStefano	ČZ	8	9	13	8	14	9	5	5	6	6		5	15	4	12	7	11	14			11	20	14	566
10	Wyman Priddy	Kawasaki	5	4	4	9	17	5	6	6	10		2													539
-	Jim Cooke	Kawasaki									9	5	8	4	11	8	11	14	9	13	17	16	15	9	12	-
-	Steve Stackable	ČZ			6		9			3			11	13	10	18	15	13				6	6	12	4	-
-	Mark Blackwell	Husqvarna		7	7		6	7	4								10	11	10	10	12	17		10	18	-
-	Robert Harris	Bultaco	12			5		4			2		20		7	7	18	10			16	15		18	17	-
-	Gary Jones	Maico													5	12	13	16	4		2	8	14	5	9	-
-	Sonny DeFeo	Maico						12			11					14	8	9	15	11	20	14	13	7	16	-
-	John DeSoto	ČZ			14	3	2	8	16		7	2									18	10	17		20	-
-	Tony Wynn	Kawasaki	16	6		7	5	19	7				6	20	16	11	19									-
-	Jim Pomeroy	Bultaco													4	3	2	4	8	9						-
-	Gary Chaplin	Honda													17	5	9	17	12	15	10	9	12	19	5	-
-	Jimmy Weinert	Kawasaki													18	20	3	1		2	1					-
-	Robert Tuggle	Husqvarna		14			10		10	9			12	8												-
-	Jim West	Husqvarna																			14	13	7	4	10	-
-	Steve Hackney	Husqvarna		11			12		8	14				7												-
-	John Borg	Maico	7			20		20																		-
-	Donald Smith	ČZ	9		20																					-
-	Jody Foust	Husqvarna	10	12																						-
-	David Stewart	Maico	11		9																					-
-	Fred Hanna	Husqvarna		8					9																	-
-	Jimmy Ellis	Yamaha					3																			-
-	Billy Grossi	Yamaha								4																-
-	Mickey Boone	Suzuki											3													-
-	Rex Staten	Maico																						2	19	-
Sources only document the points awarded to the first ten competitors. Source:

=== 250cc ===
Pos	Rider	Machine	1	2	3	4	5	6	7	8	9	10	11	12	13	14	15	16	17	Pts
1	Gary Jones	Honda			1	6	2	1	1		9	10	4	4	3	4	1	1	1	1,445
2	Rich Thorwaldson	Suzuki	7	2	11	2	5	3	3	7	6	5	18	19	13	1	18	2	3	1,086
3	Bob Grossi	Husqvarna	1		3	10	10	4	10	8	3	6	11	6	2	3	6		10	900
4	Jimmy Weinert	Kawasaki	2	1	8	1	9		9	4		9	7	18		2	16		2	878
5	Tim Hart	Yamaha							4		5	4	8	7	1	6	7	3	4	710
6	Marty Tripes	Honda			2	9	1	5		6	1	8	13	10						603
7	Pierre Karsmakers	Yamaha								1	7	1	17	1						494
8	Gary Chaplin	Maico				5		2		10	10	17	6	2		19	5	7		486
9	DeWayne Jones	Honda	5	4	4		4	8	2		16	13	20	13	17	12				485
10	Jim Pomeroy	Bultaco								3	2	2	2	16						465
-	John Franklin	Maico	4			11		18		17	14		9			8		15	9	-
-	Bill Clements	Husqvarna		7	15	4	17	7	12		11							12		-
-	Ricky Jordan	ČZ	18	5		3	3	6	8	20							8	9	17	-
-	Rich Eierstedt	Honda								9	8	7	15	5	14	5	2	5	5	-
-	John Borders	Bultaco			6	8											4	13	7	-
-	Terry Clark	Husqvarna													5	16	12	4	12	-
-	John DeSoto	ČZ								12	20	3	1							-
-	Bruce Baron	Honda		8		7	7								6					-
-	Brad Lackey	Kawasaki								2	13		3							-
-	Carl Siegal	Yamaha				13	6									15		6		-
-	Mike Runyard	Suzuki								5	18	14	10							-
-	Scott Jordan	Bultaco	16	6					11									12		-
-	Rick Baumberger	Yamaha						12				16		15		10	9			-
-	Kent Howerton	ČZ							6						4				6	-
-	John Joyner	Montesa			5	12	18													-
-	Al Baker	Kawasaki													8	11	3			-
-	Gary Semics	Husqvarna									19		5	3						-
-	Greg Thornton	Bultaco	9				11											20	8	-
-	Mark Harmon	Honda													9		13	18	13	-
-	Robert Esterlein	Husqvarna		19					13						10				15	-
-	David Clemence	Bultaco	10	13		17	20													-
-	Gary Bailey	Bultaco	3															10		-
-	Gary Ingham	Maico	6															8		-
-	Robert Thompson	Husqvarna						9						8						-
-	Jim West	Husqvarna								13	4									-
-	Barry Higgins	Yamaha		3		16														-
-	Joel Nicholson	Honda			7		12													-
-	Ralph Holmburg	ČZ		9			14													-
-	Chris Douthitt	Husqvarna	11		10															-
-	James Wicks	ČZ		20				10	20											-
-	Steve Stackable	ČZ	8	17																-
-	Dewitt Knox	Yamaha							5											-
-	Jack O'Leary	Yamaha							7											-
-	John Savitski	Bultaco														7				-
-	Cary Smith	Bultaco			9															-
-	Frank Stacy	ČZ												9						-
Sources only document the points awarded to the first ten competitors. Source:
