= Steve Stackable =

American motorcycle racer

- Nationality: American
- Born: July 3, 1954 (age 72) Wiesbaden, Germany

Motocross career
- Years active: 1974 - 1981
- Teams: Maico, Suzuki, Kawasaki
- Championships: AMA 500cc SX - 1975
- Wins: 2

Steve Stackable (born July 3, 1954) is an American former professional motocross racer and hang glider instructor. He competed in the AMA Motocross Championships from 1974 to 1981. Stackable is notable for winning the 1975 AMA 500cc Supercross national championship.

== Motocross career ==
Stackable was born in Wiesbaden, Germany where his father served in the U.S. Military. He was raised in Wyoming and briefly in Japan before his family settled in Austin, Texas when he was 16-years-old. Stackable purchased a 175cc Yamaha motorcycle and began racing motocross in the early 1970s, easily winning his first races as a novice class racer. He began his professional racing career in 1972 and began competing in the AMA motocross national championships on a privateer CZ. In 1974 season, Stackable contested the 500cc motocross national championship riding a privateer Maico and ended the season ranked third behind Jimmy Weinert and Tony DiStefano.

Stackable's performance earned him a place on the Maico factory team for the 1975 season. 1975 would mark the peak of Stackable's career. He began the season by winning the Daytona 500cc Supercross race and followed with another victory at the Dallas 500cc supercross race to win the AMA 500cc Supercross national championship ahead of DiStefano and Weinert.

Stackable's good results continued in the 1975 500cc AMA outdoor Motocross National Championship. As the national championship reached the climactic final race of the season in New Orleans, Stackable was one of five competitors with a mathematical chance to win the title including; Suzuki’s Billy Grossi, Honda’s Pierre Karsmakers, Husqvarna’s Kent Howerton, and Yamaha’s Jimmy Weinert. In the first of two motos, he was in second place with only a few laps left in the race when his spokes started coming out of his motorcycle's front wheel. He struggled to finish the race but dropped down in the field of competitors to finish in 11th place. He easily won the second moto however, his poor result in the first moto relegated him to second place in the season final standings behind the defending champion Jimmy Weinert.

Stackable was hired by the Suzuki factory motocross team in 1976 on the recommendation of Roger De Coster who was impressed by Stackable's riding after he placed third behind De Coster and Harry Everts at the Lake Whitney round of the 1974 Trans-AMA motocross series. He won the first national championship race of his career on August 1, 1976 at the Unadilla motocross circuit in New Berlin, New York. Despite finishing third in both the 250cc and 500cc Outdoor National classes, Suzuki released him at the end of the season because he didn't provide the desired results.

Stackable rejoined the Maico team for the 1977 season and he would claim the second national event of his career when he won the 500cc class at the Lake Whitney, Texas national. He once again placed third in the AMA 500cc motocross national championship, this time behind Bob Hannah and Marty Smith.

Stackable along with DiStefano, Kent Howerton and Gary Semics, represented the United States at the 1977 Motocross des Nations and Trophy des Nations events where they scored impressive second-place finishes in France and Holland, at a time when American motocross racers were still seen as less experienced than their European rivals. He continued to race until 1981, but without the same level of success and retired from motocross racing at the age of 27.

After his motocross racing career, Stackable became a tandem hang gliding and paragliding instructor. He operated the Torrey Pines Gliderport service department until his retirement.
