= Jim Pomeroy (motorcyclist) =

American motorcycle racer (1952–2006)

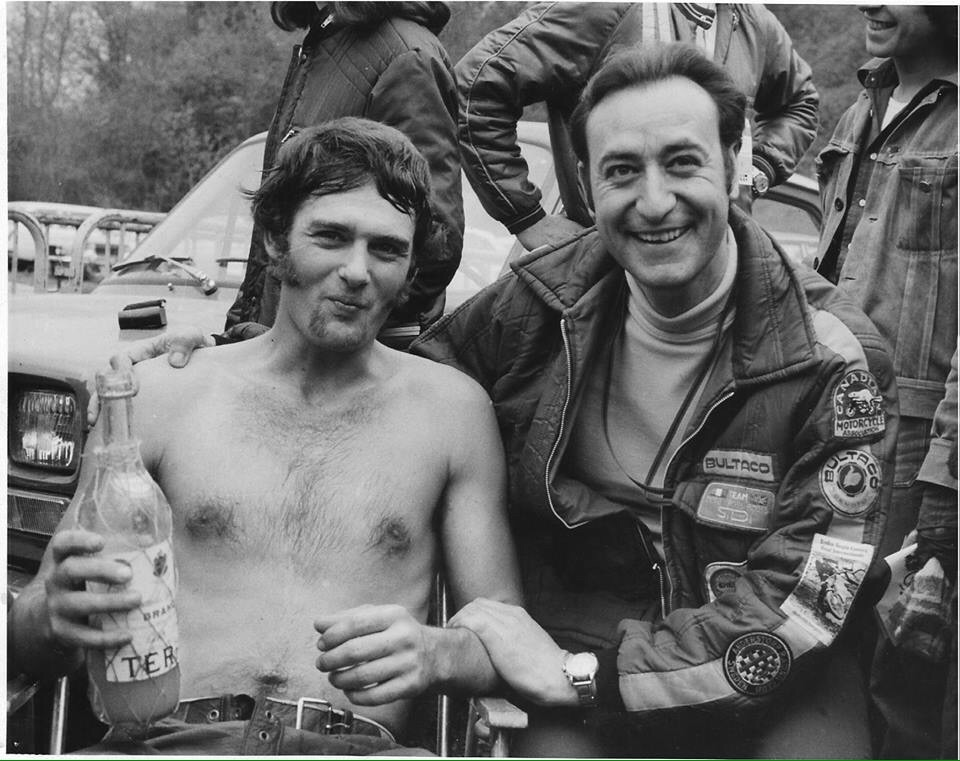
- Jim Pomeroy and Oriol Puig Bultó (right) just after Pomeroy won the first moto of the 1973 250cc Spanish Motocross Grand Prix, held at the Circuit del Vallès on April 8.
- Nationality: American
- Born: 16 November 1952 Sunnyside, Washington, U.S.
- Died: 6 August 2006 (aged 53) Tampico, Washington, U.S.

Motocross career
- Years active: 1970 - 1980
- Teams: Bultaco, Honda, Beta
- Wins: 6

Jim Pomeroy (November 16, 1952 – August 6, 2006) was an American professional motocross racer. He competed in the AMA Motocross Championships from 1972 to 1973 and in the Motocross World Championships from 1973 to 1976, before returning to compete in the AMA Motocross Championships from 1977 to 1978.

Pomeroy is notable for being the first American competitor to win an overall victory in an FIM Motocross World Championship Grand Prix race. Pomeroy was inducted into the AMA Motorcycle Hall of Fame in 1999 and, in 2018 he was inducted into the Central Washington Sports Hall of Fame.

== Professional racing career ==
=== Early roots ===
Born in Sunnyside, Washington, Pomeroy's family relocated to Yakima, Washington shortly after he was born. His father was a former motorcycle racer who owned a motorcycle shop that had employed Evel Knievel before he became a famous daredevil stunt rider. Pomeroy began to race professionally in Canada to circumvent the American Motorcyclist Association's 18-year-old age restriction and ended up winning the Western Canadian Championship. He made his AMA debut in 1970 and posted a sixth-place finish in the support race of the 1970 Trans-AMA motocross series round in Washington.

In 1972, Pomeroy competed in the inaugural AMA Motocross National Championship. He won the season opening 250cc race at Saddleback Park in California before, switching to the 500cc class where he finished the 1972 season in fifth place overall. His performance earned him Bultaco factory support through a local Bultaco distributor. He was offered the opportunity to compete in a few select world championship Grand Prix events in Europe and he readily accepted.

When the AMA showed no interest in sending an American team to the 1972 Motocross des Nations in Belgium, Brad Lackey persuaded Pomeroy, Jimmy Weinert and Gary Jones to join him in the first-ever team to represent the United States at the event, where the team posted a seventh place result.

=== First American Motocross Grand Prix winner ===
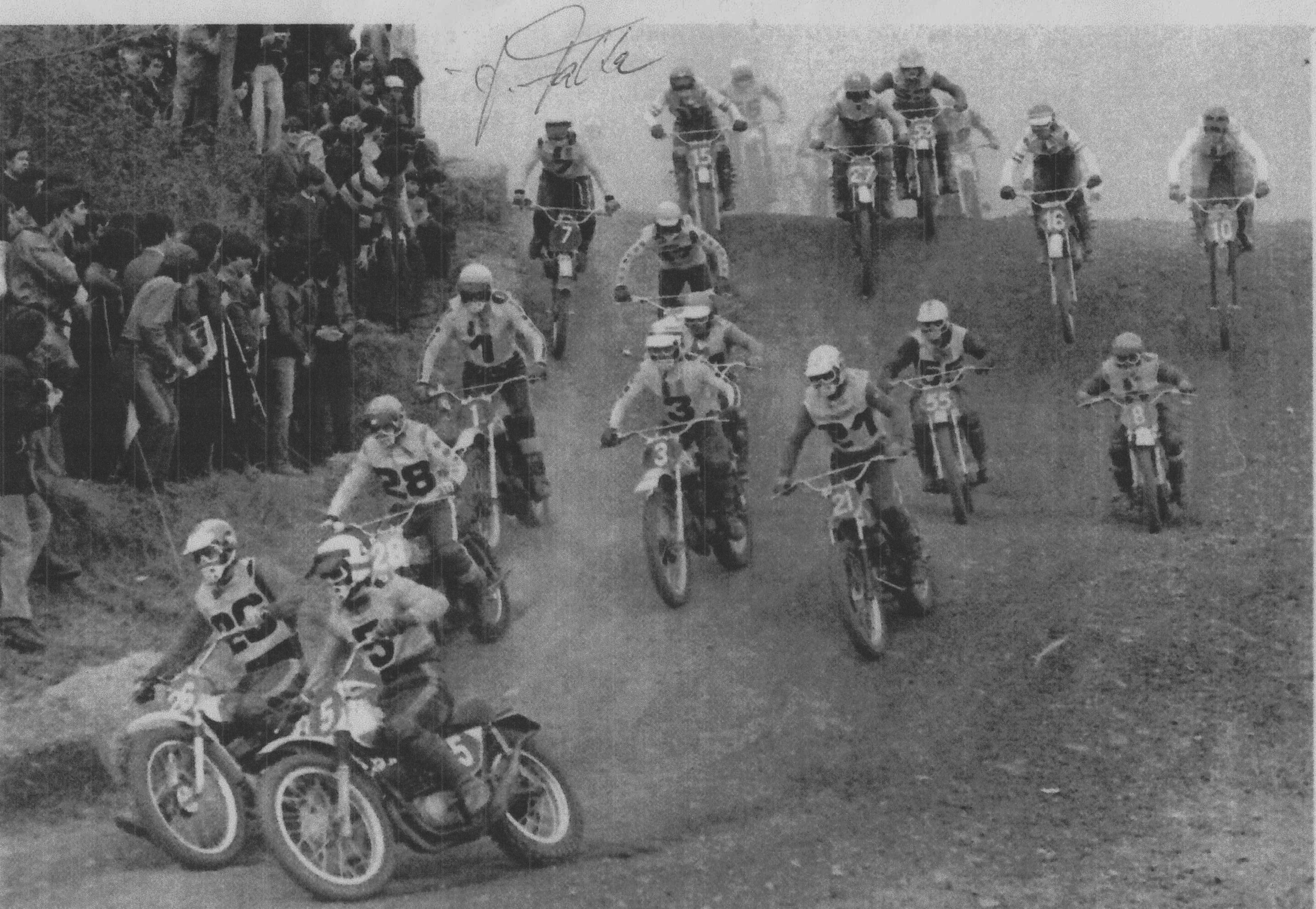
Pomeroy (26) leading the start of the 1973 250cc Spanish Grand Prix.

In the early 1970s, European riders still dominated the sport of motocross and Americans weren't considered as talented due to their relative lack of experience in the nascent motorsport. Pomeroy arrived in Europe as an unknown and then proceeded to shock the motorcycle world by riding his privateer Bultaco to an upset victory in the 1973 250cc Spanish motocross Grand Prix.

Pomeroy's surprising victory in what was officially the first world championship race of his career, came at a time when European riders dominated the sport, and it was considered a significant accomplishment for an American rider to finish among the top five against the more experienced European competitors.

The news of Pomeroy's unexpected victory created a huge wave of excitement in the American motorcycle community where motocross was undergoing an explosive growth in popularity. His victory signaled that American motocross riders were ready to compete with the best in the world. The Bultaco factory promptly hired him to remain in Europe to compete in the 250cc motocross world championship where he placed seventh in the season final points standings.

=== Later career ===
When the World Championship concluded, Pomeroy returned to the United States where he finished in 10th place in the 1973 AMA Motocross National Championship season, despite only competing in five rounds of the 15-race series. He also competed in the 1973 Inter-AMA series where he was the highest placed American rider, finishing in third place behind Heikki Mikkola and Pierre Karsmakers. Pomeroy was once again named to the American team for the 1973 Motocross des Nations event where he helped the team improve to a fourth place result. After his groundbreaking world championship campaign, the AMA honored him with his selection as the recipient of the AMA Most Popular MX rider award.

Pomeroy began the 1974 season in the United States where he won the first indoor Supercross race held at the Houston Astrodome. In the 1974 World Championship, he scored two podium positions but, experienced equipment failures to finish the year a disappointing 14th. In the 1974 Trans-AMA motocross series Pomeroy scored several top three finishes however, his machinery continued to experience equipment failures. Despite his equipment problems, he finished the series as the top ranked American rider, placing fourth against a strong field of European competitors.

Pomeroy along with Brad Lackey, Jimmy Weinert and Tony DiStefano represented the United States at the 1974 Motocross des Nations event where they finished in an impressive second-place, due to Lackey and Pomeroy scoring fifth and sixth place results in the first moto. Their performance marked the best-ever result at the time for an American team at the event.

In 1975, Pomeroy was once again competitive in the World Championships, winning the Belgian Grand Prix along with a second place and two third places to finish the season ranked seventh overall. Returning to the United States after the world championships, Pomeroy posted the first moto victory by an American in a Trans-AMA event. Incredibly, he won the race on a stock Bultaco motorcycle borrowed from a spectator at the event as, his factory motorcycle was delayed in shipping from Europe. Pomeroy led the 1975 Trans-AMA series for a number of races, marking the first time that an American rider had led the series. Unfortunately, he injured his knee at the Puyallup round and was not able to complete the series. He also posted another impressive result at the 1975 Trophée des Nations where he became the first American competitor to win a moto outright in the event, defeating the reigning 500cc world champion, Roger De Coster.

The 1976 season would be Pomeroy's most successful season in when he posted a career-high finish of fourth place against the best riders in the world. Despite his success in the world championships, Pomeroy accepted a contract offer to race for Honda in the AMA national championships in 1977.

Pomeroy began the season by finishing second to Bob Hannah in the 1977 Supercross championship and, followed that with a third-place finish in the 250cc national championship final standings behind Tony DiStefano and Marty Smith. Also in 1977, Pomeroy became the first American competitor to win a moto at the 500cc United States Motocross Grand Prix.

Following an injury plagued season in 1978, Pomeroy returned to Europe in 1979 to compete for Bultaco in the world championships. Unfortunately, the Bultaco factory was experiencing financial difficulties and closed a few months later. He then switched to compete for the Beta factory team however, their motorcycle proved to be too fragile and unreliable for the rigors of world championship motocross.

== Post-racing career ==
By 1980, injuries had begun to take a physical toll on his body and Pomeroy made the decision to retire from competition. He continued his involvement in the sport of motocross by conducting motocross schools and by participating in American Historic Racing Motorcycle Association events involving vintage motorcycles. Pomeroy was inducted into the AMA Motorcycle Hall of Fame in 1999.

On August 6, 2006, Pomeroy was killed when his Jeep rolled in a single-vehicle accident near Yakima, Washington.

In 2018, Pomeroy was the winner in a Readers’ Choice vote for induction with the inaugural class of the Central Washington Sports Hall of Fame.

=== Career highlights ===
- The first American to win an FIM Motocross World Championship Event (Spain 1973)
- The first rider to win his debut World Championship Motocross Grand Prix race (Spain 1973)
- The first American to lead the Motocross World Championship (Spain 1973)
- The first rider to win a World Championship Motocross Grand Prix on a Spanish motorcycle (Bultaco)
- The first winner of an indoor Supercross race (Houston, 1974)
- The first American to lead the Trans-AMA Championship (1975)
- The first American to win a moto at the 500cc United States Motocross Grand Prix (Carlsbad 1977)
- The first non-world champion to win the Trophée des Nations event (1975)

== Motocross Grand Prix Results ==
Points system from 1969 to 1980:

Position	1	2	3	4	5	6	7	8	9	10
Points	15	12	10	8	6	5	4	3	2	1

Year	Class	Team	1		2		3		4		5		6		7		8		9		10		11		12		Pos	Pts
Year	Class	Team	R1	R2	R1	R2	R1	R2	R1	R2	R1	R2	R1	R2	R1	R2	R1	R2	R1	R2	R1	R2	R1	R2	R1	R2	Pos	Pts
1973	250cc	Bultaco	ESP; 1	ESP; 4	ITA; 5	ITA; 5	BEL -	BEL; 7	CH; 6	CH -	POL -	POL; 5	YUG -	YUG; 5	FRA -	FRA -	FIN; 3	FIN; 10	USR; 8	USR -	SWE; 10	SWE -	AUT -	AUT -			7th	71
1974	250cc	Bultaco	ESP; 7	ESP; 10	ITA -	ITA -	CZE; 7	CZE; 3	POL -	POL -	YUG -	YUG -	UK -	UK -	GER -	GER -	NED -	NED -	FIN; 8	FIN; 3	SWE -	SWE; 6	CH -	CH; 7			14th	41
1975	250cc	Bultaco	ESP -	ESP -	AUT; 6	AUT; 5	BEL; 1	BEL; 4	CZE -	CZE; 6	POL -	POL -	YUG; 6	YUG; 4	GER; 3	GER; 10	UK; 3	UK; 8	FRA; 6	FRA; 8	SWE -	SWE; 5	FIN -	FIN -	CH; 5	CH; 2	7th	101
1976	250cc	Bultaco	ESP; 4	ESP; 4	BEL; 7	BEL; 4	CZE; 4	CZE -	POL; 1	POL; 5	USR -	USR -	YUG -	YUG; 6	ITA; 1	ITA -	FRA -	FRA -	UK; 4	UK -	GER -	GER; 3	NED; 3	NED; 9	SWE -	SWE -	4th	102
1977	500cc	Honda	AUT -	AUT -	NED -	NED -	SWE -	SWE -	FIN -	FIN -	GER -	GER -	ITA -	ITA -	USA; 1	USA -	CAN -	CAN -	UK -	UK -	BEL -	BEL -	LUX -	LUX -	CH -	CH -	15th	15
1979	250cc	Bultaco/Beta	ESP -	ESP; 9	NED -	NED -	ITA; 8	ITA -	BEL -	BEL -	YUG; 4	YUG -	CZE -	CZE; 7	POL -	POL -	FRA -	FRA -	FIN -	FIN -	USA -	USA -	GER; 4	GER -	BUL -	BUL -	18th	25
1980	500cc	Beta	CH -	CH -	AUT -	AUT -	FRA -	FRA; 10	SWE -	SWE -	FIN -	FIN -	ITA -	ITA -	NED -	NED -	USA -	USA -	CAN -	CAN -	GER -	GER -	BEL -	BEL -	LUX -	LUX -	39th	1
