= Marty Smith =

American motorcycle racer (1956–2020)

- Born: November 26, 1956 San Diego, California, U.S.
- Died: April 27, 2020 (aged 63) Algodones Dunes, California, U.S.

Motocross career
- Years active: 1974–1981
- Teams: Honda, Suzuki
- Championships: AMA 125cc – 1974, 1975 AMA 500cc – 1977
- Wins: 18

Martin Paul “Marty” Smith (November 26, 1956 – April 27, 2020) was an American professional motocross racer. He competed in the AMA Motocross Championships from 1974 to 1981, most prominently as a member of the Honda factory racing team with whom he won 18 AMA race victories and three National Motocross championships. During his formative years of racing, he had no teachers and learned by carefully observing the fast guys, then applying what he saw. Smith said he almost never rode at 100 percent. With his long hair, Southern California surfer looks and smooth riding style, he was a popular figure among race fans and was the first superstar of American motocross. Smith was inducted into the AMA Motorcycle Hall of Fame in 2000.

== Early motocross career ==
Born in San Diego, California, Smith first began riding motorcycles at the age of six on local trails and hills with his dad. He started racing motocross in 1971, entering his first race at Carlsbad Raceway against a much older field. Riding a Yamaha AT1 125cc enduro motorcycle stripped of lights and with an improvised number plate cut from aluminum, Smith finished fifth. As Smith progressed from Novice class to Intermediate, he moved to a Penton motocross bike and was getting his first notices in California newspapers. By 1973, Smith was racing Expert class on a Swedish-built Monark with a $100 a month factory sponsorship. At the sixth annual Hangtown Motocross Classic (the last year before it became an AMA National), Smith took the 125cc support class victory. More important than the win, however, he gained the attention of Honda who was in the process of putting together a team to compete in the newly organized AMA 125cc Nationals set to begin in 1974. Within days of his Hangtown victory, Smith signed a $35,000 contract to ride with Honda. He was just 17 years old.

== Team Honda and immediate success ==
Smith made a name for himself on the motocross scene by winning the inaugural AMA 125cc National Motocross Championship in 1974. Still in high school, he was the subject of a Peter Starr documentary called "To Be a Champion" which chronicled his successful AMA debut and elevated him to "rock-star" status among his school-aged peers. This attention didn't go unnoticed by Honda who featured his youthful good looks in its advertising or American boosters of motocross who put him on dozens of magazine covers.

Smith followed up his rookie season with another 125cc AMA championship title in 1975. He dominated the circuit that year by winning six of seven nationals and every moto but one. That same year, he won the 125cc U.S. Grand Prix of Motocross, finished second in the 250cc AMA Supercross series and won the first of his three career Trans-AMA race victories.

Having complete command of the AMA 125cc circuit for two years, Honda executives decided in 1976 that Smith should compete at both the AMA Nationals and in Europe for the World Grand Prix series. A confident Smith felt that he could beat anyone and manage the back-and-forth travel easily. He agreed to do it. In the U.S., Honda and Smith's plans were quickly upset by the emergence of a rider that would soon overshadow the entire motocross world including Smith himself: Bob Hannah. The relatively unknown Hannah racing for Yamaha, easily beat Smith at the series opener at Hangtown and would win five of the first six 125cc Nationals and walk away with the AMA Championship; Smith finishing a distant runner-up. In Europe, his Grand Prix efforts also faltered. Smith characterized his European works Honda as "basically junk" and often found himself sidelined in the pits because of mechanical problems. However, he managed to win his first Grand Prix in Europe over 125cc World Champion Gaston Rahier at Nissebjerget outside of Copenhagen, Denmark, and repeat as champion of the U.S. Grand Prix at the Mid-Ohio MX Park besting Rahier and holding off a runner-up Hannah in both motos. Smith placed fourth in the 1976 125cc Motocross World Championship despite breaking down almost as many times as he finished, a cool reception from European riders and fans, and an ambitious travel schedule that took a bigger toll than he had expected. (Note: Smith's less-than-friendly welcome in Europe left him with a negative view of racing there and caused him to decline participating for Team USA at the Trophee des Nations and Motocross des Nations for the remainder of his career.)

In 1977, Smith stepped away from competing in the 125cc class and moved up to 250cc and 500cc bikes. While he won one supercross event in New Orleans, he finished a disappointing fifth for the series. Moving outdoor, Smith battled Tony DiStefano for the 250cc National title. A blown transmission at RedBud Track 'n Trail in the second to last race put the championship out of reach for Smith as he finished second to DiStefano who won the 250cc title for the third time in a row. However, the shoe was on the other foot for Smith in the 500cc class as he traded wins with rival Bob Hannah throughout the six-event series. Smith went into the last round just six points ahead of Hannah for the championship. Hannah's throttle cable malfunctioned while leading the first moto and left him unable to finish, handing Smith the 500cc National crown and his final AMA title. Smith along with Bob Hannah capped off the year by giving Roger De Coster his strongest American challenge to date in the 1977 Trans-AMA series. While De Coster won his fourth consecutive Trans-AMA title, Smith took two rounds of the series and finished third just a few points behind Hannah for the runner-up spot. The two Trans-AMA victories would be Smith's last AMA sanctioned wins.

For the 1978 season, the AMA adopted a new rule that required all professional riders declare their class for the year putting an end to multiple outdoor class racing. Smith chose to defend his 500cc title. The Supercross series, however, came first and Smith entered the season feeling he was riding at his best. At day two of the Houston Supercross, multiple riders went down in the first turn of the main event including Smith and Tony DiStefano. Smith would suffer a dislocated hip and DiStefano a torn up knee. Neither would win another race again. Smith had to lay on the track in extreme pain until the race was finished. At the hospital, none of the doctors who could put a hip back into place were on duty so he had to wait until the following day to have his hip repaired. It was his first serious injury and it had a profound effect on him. According to Smith, the experience mentally broke him. Racing all of the sudden was no longer fun. He finished third in the 500cc National Motocross Championship later that year, but he was never the same rider after the Houston crash and his heart wasn't into racing anymore.

== Move to Suzuki and retirement ==
Smith raced for Honda for one more year in 1979 competing in the Supercross and 500cc class. He finished outside the top ten for both series. Smith seriously considered retiring after the 1979 season. His relationship with Honda had changed. While he was winning, Honda was like family. But after a tough couple of years, they became very cold and corporate and ready to move on from Smith.

Suzuki offered Smith a lucrative two-year contract for which he later admitted he signed for the money. But corporate support was good and the Suzuki bikes were very competitive. In his first race for Suzuki, Smith finished second at the 1980 Daytona Supercross. On the outdoor stage, he showed that he hadn't lost his skill finishing third for the 1980 500cc title just a few points short of runner-up Goat Breker. Still a threat for a podium appearance but no longer a realistic competitor for a title, Smith quietly finished the 1981 season 12th overall for the Supercross series and 6th for the 500cc Nationals. Once the very center of attention for American motocross fans, Smith retired with little fanfare at the end of the 1981 season at age 24.

== Later career ==
Smith stayed involved in motorcycling. Shortly after retirement, he signed a six-month contract to promote and test the new Cagiva motocross bike. Smith later would say that Cagiva paid him more in six months than he made in his best year at Honda. In 1991, he teamed up with Larry Roeseler and Ted Hunnicutt Jr. to win the famous Baja 1000 desert race on a Kawasaki. Smith also started a successful motocross school called the Marty Smith Motocross Clinic. Smith was inducted into the AMA Motorcycle Hall of Fame in 2000.

== Death ==
Smith and his wife Nancy were killed in a dune buggy rollover accident at the Imperial Sand Dunes in Southern California on April 27, 2020. He was 63.
