= Gerrit Wolsink =

Dutch motorcycle racer (born 1947)

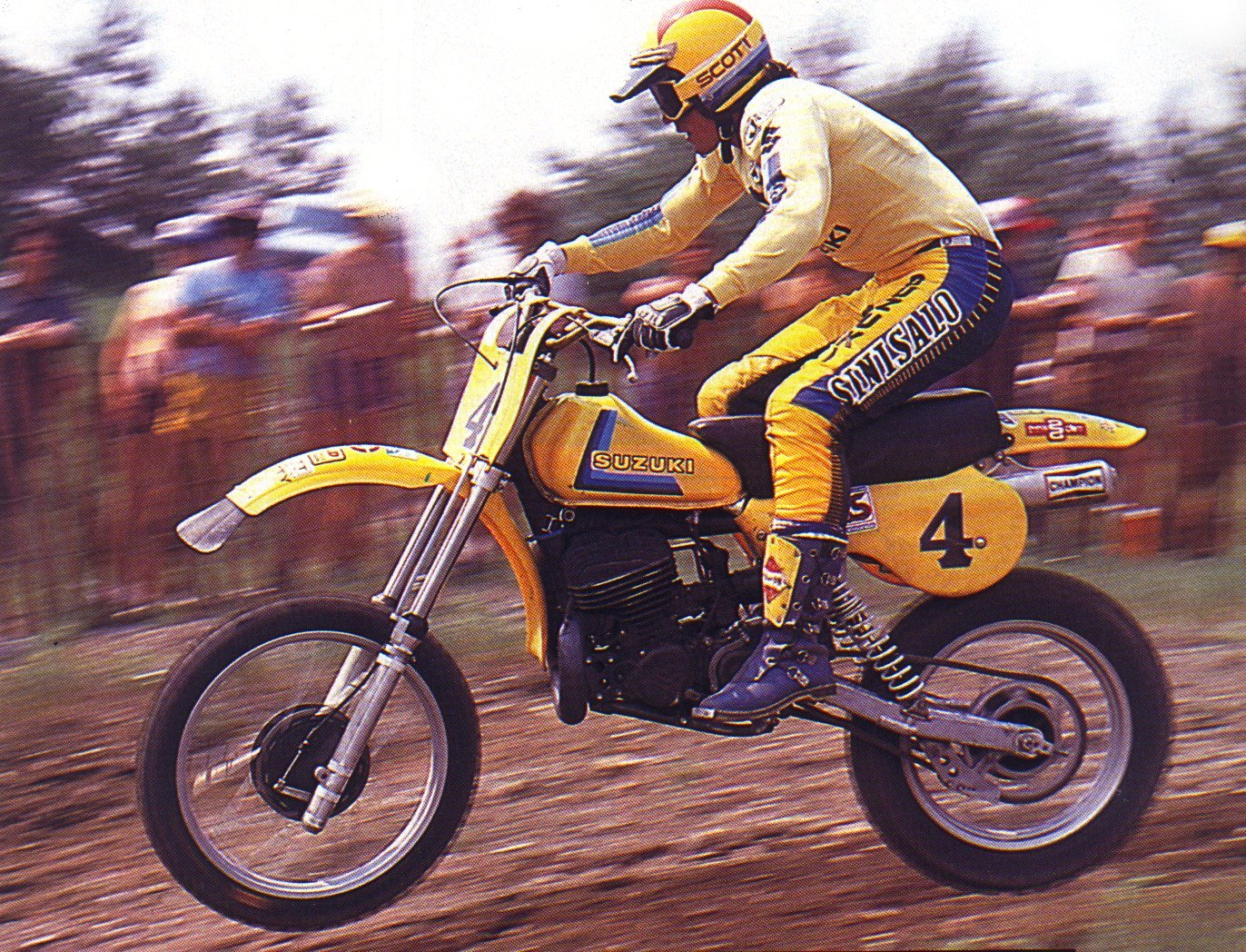
- Wolsink in 1979
- Nationality: Dutch
- Born: 3 March 1947 (age 79) Hengelo, Gelderland, Netherlands

Motocross career
- Years active: 1968-1982
- Teams: Suzuki
- Wins: 15

Gerrit Wolsink (born 3 March 1947) is a Dutch former professional Grand Prix motocross racer. He competed in the Motocross World Championships from 1968 to 1982, most prominently as a member of the Suzuki factory racing team alongside five-time World Champion Roger De Coster. A two-time 500cc Class Vice Champion, Wolsink was one of the top competitors in the 500cc Motocross World Championships. He is notable for winning the 500cc United States Motocross Grand Prix five times within a six-year span.

== Motocross racing career ==
=== Early life ===
Wolsink was born in Hengelo, Gelderland where his father operated a shop that sold bicycles, mopeds, motorcycles and automobiles. His uncle was former motocross racer Bennie Hartelman, who had raced a BSA Gold Star motorcycle in the 500cc Motocross World Championships against former World Champions such as Sten Lundin and Bill Nilsson during the 1950s and 1960s. As a young boy, Wolsink spent time attending motorcycle races with his uncle which helped to spark his interest in racing. He began motocross racing using modified 50cc mopeds.

Wolsink progressed to racing as a privateer aboard a Husqvarna motorcycle in the Dutch national championships however, his mother insisted that he should graduate from university. He was able to finance his education by racing motocross during the summer months. At the age of 21, Wolsink won the 1968 Dutch National Championship and competed in his first Motocross World Championship event at the 1968 500cc Austrian Grand Prix riding a Husqvarna motorcycle. At the 1968 500cc Dutch Grand Prix, he placed ninth in the first moto (heat race), then he scored an impressive fourth-place finish in the second moto ahead of former World Champion, Jeff Smith (BSA).

=== Maico factory team ===
Wolsink graduated from university with a dental degree in Periodontology at the end of 1972 but, put his dental career on hold to fully commit to becoming a professional motocross racer. When Åke Jonsson left the Maico factory team to join Yamaha's 500cc team after the 1972 season, Wolsink was hired to replace him alongside teammates Adolf Weil and Willy Bauer. The first overall victory of Wolsink's career came in his first race as a Maico team member at the season opening 1973 500cc French Grand Prix, where he took the win ahead of Oldrich Hamrsmid (ČZ) and teammate Bauer.

After placing fifth in the 1973 500cc World Championships, Wolsink participated in the 1973 Trans-AMA series in the United States. The Trans-AMA was an international series established by the American Motorcyclist Association as a pilot event to help establish motocross in the United States. He won Round 2 held in John F. Kennedy Stadium in Philadelphia, Pennsylvania and finished the series in second place behind his Maico teammate Adolf Weil.

=== Suzuki years ===
Wolsink was contracted ride for the Suzuki factory racing team as defending champion, Roger De Coster's teammate for the 1974 season. In 1974, Wolsink won the first of what would be four consecutive victories at the Carlsbad Raceway, site of the 500cc United States Motocross Grand Prix. Wolsink was leading Husqvarna factory team rider Heikki Mikkola on the final lap of the second moto with Mikkola gaining rapidly. Wolsink lost control of his motorcycle and crashed as he reached the finish line, just as Mikkola was about to pass him. Race judges ruled that Wolsink had crossed the finish line first for one of the most spectacular finishes in history of the Carlsbad Raceway. His 1974 Carlsbad victory brought him to international prominence due to the race being broadcast on ABC's highly rated Wide World of Sports television program.

Mikkola eventually won the 1974 500cc Motocross World Championship with Wolsink ending the season ranked fourth in the world. After the world championship season, Wolsink returned to the United States to compete in the 1974 Trans-AMA motocross series where he won Round 4 in Orlando, Florida and finished the series in second place behind his Suzuki teammate, De Coster.

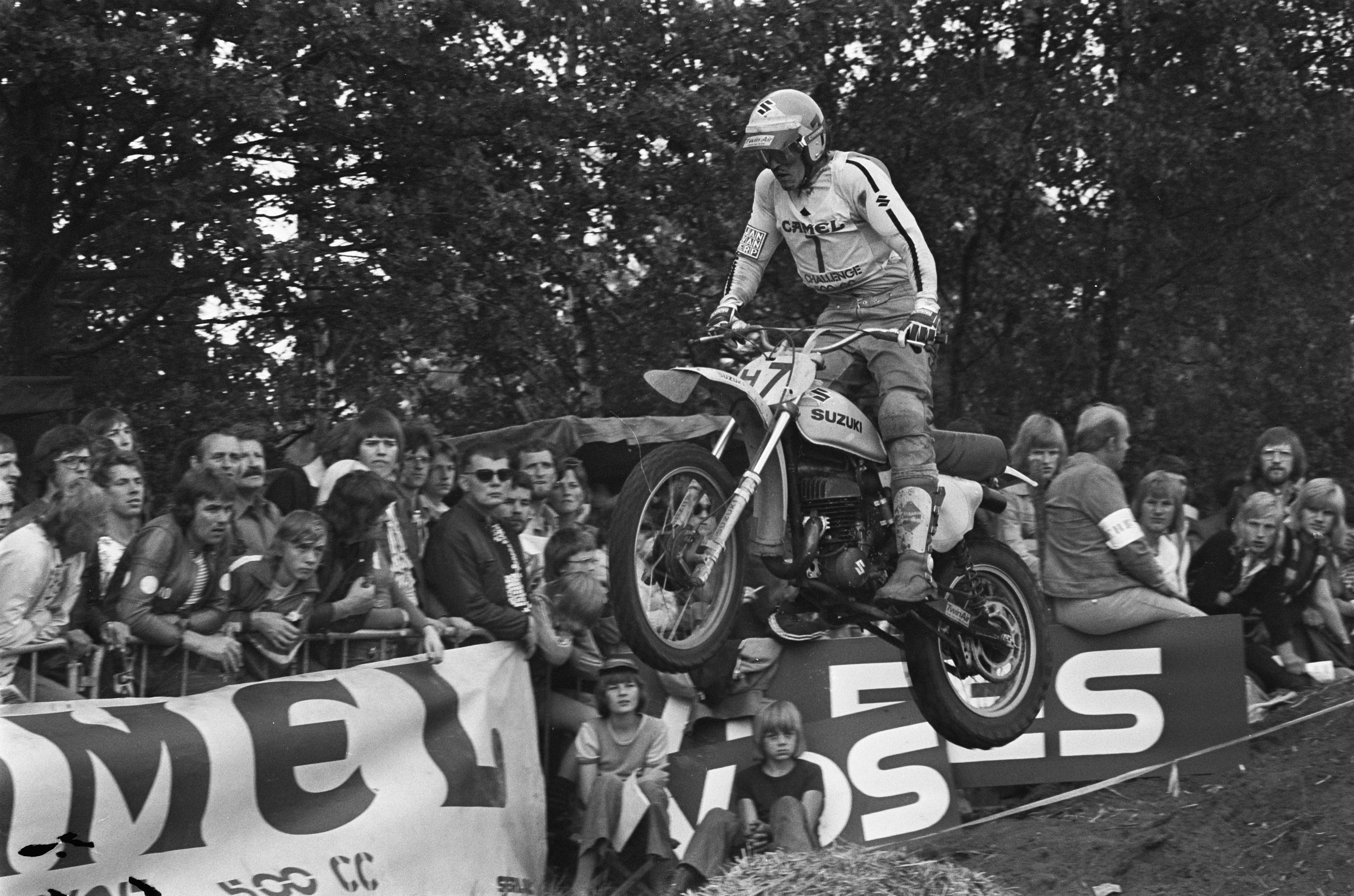
Wolsink in action during the 500cc Dutch Grand Prix on 27 July 1975.

In 1975, Wolsink improved to third in the 500cc World Championship as his teammate De Coster won his fourth title with Mikkola in second place. He won his second consecutive 500cc United States Grand Prix in 1975 as well as victories at the 500cc British Grand Prix and his home Grand Prix in the Netherlands. For the third consecutive year, he placed second in the Trans-AMA series in the United States, as his teammate De Coster claimed the 1975 series win.

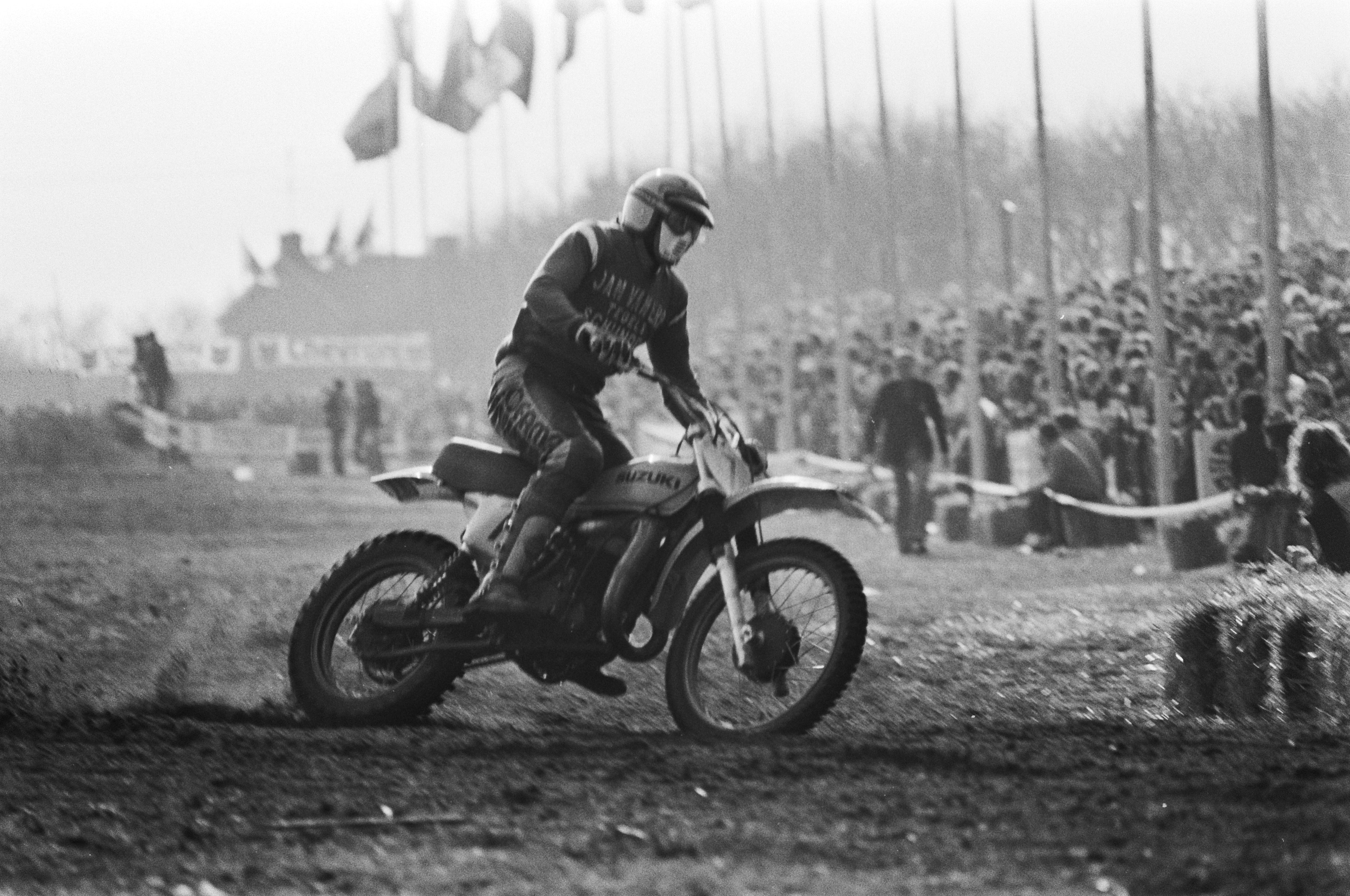
Wolsink competing in the pre-season Motocross der Azen in St. Anthonis, Holland on 14 March 1976.

1976 was Wolsink's best year as, he finished on the podium in seven of the twelve Grand Prix races including four Grand Prix victories (Switzerland, Finland, United States and Canada) as he engaged in a season-long battle with his Suzuki teammate De Coster. The championship wasn't decided until the final race of the season in Luxembourg where Wolsink lost the title by six points. When Heikki Mikkola signed a contract to race for the Yamaha factory racing team in 1977, he became the dominant rider in the 500cc World Championship for the next two seasons while the Suzuki team struggled with mechanical issues. Wolsink ended the 1977 season ranked third in the 500cc World Championship behind Mikkola and De Coster but was able to win his fourth consecutive 500cc United States Motocross Grand Prix.

Mikkola had dominated the previous two seasons and was the overwhelming favorite to win the 1979 title until he suffered torn ligaments in his leg during pre-season practice. Mikkola's injury allowed his competitors to fill the void and six different competitors won Grand Prix races in 1979 (Noyce, Lackey, Wolsink, Mikkola, Bruno and Malherbe). Wolsink won the 500cc United States Grand Prix for the fifth time then won the following 500cc Canadian Grand Prix to put him within reach of the championship points leader, Graham Noyce (Honda) at midseason. However, despite only winning two Grand Prix races, Noyce was able to post consistent results to clinch the World Championship ahead of second placed Wolsink who finished just one point ahead of third placed André Malherbe (Honda).

=== Later career ===
Despite his performance, the Suzuki team released both Wolsink and De Coster at the end of the 1979 season, citing the desire to hire younger riders. Noyce and Malherbe were 10 years younger than the 32 year old Wolsink. In 1979, he worked as the stunt double for actor Rutger Hauer in the motocross scenes in the Paul Verhoeven film Spetters. He returned to race for the Maico team for the 1980 season however, by then the Japanese motorcycle manufacturers had begun to open a technological gap over the European manufacturers and the Maico motorcycles were no longer competitive. At the season ending 1980 Motocross des Nations event, he helped the Dutch team take runner-up position behind the powerful Belgian team.

Wolsink received sponsorship from Honda of Netherlands for the 1981 season with the assistance of his former teammate, De Coster, who had been hired by Honda in 1980. He competed in his final World Championship race at the 1982 500cc British Grand Prix at the age of 35. Wolsink also competed in enduro events for the Honda team. He rode a Honda to win the four-stroke class at the 1981 International Six Days Enduro (ISDT) and was a member of the winning Dutch team at the 1984 International Six Days Enduro.

After his motocross racing career, Wolsink returned to the Netherlands to resume his dental career. He restores old motocycles, mainly motocross bikes and brings them to auctions in Las Vegas, Nevada every year.

== Career overview ==
Wolsink won 22 individual heat races and 15 Grand Prix overall victories during his career in the Motocross World Championships. He was a two-time 500cc Class Vice Champion (1976, 1979} and an eight-time 500cc Dutch motocross national champion (1968, 1970, 1971, 1973, 1974, 1976-1978). Wolsink was a member of twelve Dutch Motocross des Nations teams (1967, 1969, 1970, 1972-1975, 1978-1982) and four Trophée des Nations teams (1970, 1975, 1978, 1979).

== Motocross Grand Prix Results ==
Points system from 1952 to 1968:

Position	1st	2nd	3rd	4th	5th	6th
Points	8	6	4	3	2	1

Points system from 1969 to 1980:

Position	1	2	3	4	5	6	7	8	9	10
Points	15	12	10	8	6	5	4	3	2	1

Year	Class	Team	1		2		3		4		5		6		7		8		9		10		11		12		13		Pos	Pts
Year	Class	Team	R1	R2	R1	R2	R1	R2	R1	R2	R1	R2	R1	R2	R1	R2	R1	R2	R1	R2	R1	R2	R1	R2	R1	R2	R1	R2	Pos	Pts
1968	500cc	Husqvarna	AUT; 11	AUT -	ITA -	ITA -	SWE -	SWE -	FIN -	FIN -	GDR -	GDR -	CZE -	CZE -	UK -	UK -	GER -	GER -	FRA -	FRA -	NED; 9	NED; 4	BEL; 25	BEL; 16	LUX -	LUX -	CH -	CH -	22nd	2
1969	500cc	Husqvarna	AUT; 10	AUT; 10	SWE -	SWE; 4	NED; 30	NED; 7	ITA -	ITA -	CZE -	CZE -	USR -	USR -	GER -	GER -	BEL; 14	BEL; 11	LUX; 12	LUX; 9	FRA; 7	FRA; 7	CH; 19	CH; 5	GDR; 12	GDR; 20			17th	13
1970	500cc	Husqvarna	CH; 7	CH; 7	AUT -	AUT -	NED; 9	NED; 5	FRA -	FRA -	FIN; 4	FIN; 7	SWE -	SWE -	CZE -	CZE -	USR -	USR -	GER -	GER; 9	GDR; 5	GDR; 7	BEL; 13	BEL -	LUX; 6	LUX; 3			10th	28
1971	500cc	Husqvarna	ITA; 6	ITA; 8	AUT -	AUT -	SWE; 9	SWE -	FIN -	FIN; 4	CZE; 10	CZE -	USR -	USR -	GDR -	GDR -	UK -	UK -	GER -	GER -	BEL; 8	BEL; 6	LUX; 10	LUX -	NED; 3	NED; 3			12th	21
1972	500cc	Husqvarna	AUT; 5	AUT; 10	CH; 7	CH; 4	SWE; 8	SWE -	FRA; 4	FRA; 8	USR -	USR -	CZE -	CZE -	UK; 8	UK; 5	GER; 3	GER -	GDR; 12	GDR -	BEL; 7	BEL; 6	LUX; 4	LUX; 12					10th	32
1973	500cc	Maico	FRA; 6	FRA; 2	AUT -	AUT -	FIN -	FIN; 4	ITA; 4	ITA; 5	CZE; 6	CZE; 4	USA; 6	USA; 2	GER -	GER; 4	BEL; 3	BEL; 5	LUX; 3	LUX; 4	NED -	NED; 1							5th	105
1974	500cc	Suzuki	AUT; 8	AUT; 5	FRA; 9	FRA; 4	ITA -	ITA; 4	DEN; 4	DEN; 5	CZE; 4	CZE; 5	GER; 4	GER; 1	UK; 2	UK -	USA; 2	USA; 1	NED; 2	NED; 2	BEL -	BEL -	LUX -	LUX -					4th	124
1975	500cc	Suzuki	CH; 3	CH; 3	ITA; 2	ITA; 5	FIN -	FIN -	USR -	USR; 4	FRA; 5	FRA; 4	USA; 3	USA; 1	CAN; 4	CAN; 1	UK; 2	UK; 2	GER; 3	GER -	NED; 1	NED; 2	BEL -	BEL; 5	LUX; 5	LUX -			3rd	149
1976	500cc	Suzuki	CH; 1	CH; 1	FRA; 2	FRA; 4	ITA; 2	ITA -	AUT -	AUT; 9	SWE; 5	SWE -	FIN; 2	FIN; 2	GER; 2	GER; 7	USA; 1	USA; 1	CAN; 1	CAN; 1	UK; 2	UK -	BEL -	BEL; 1	LUX; 2	LUX; 2			2nd	177
1977	500cc	Suzuki	AUT; 7	AUT; 1	NED; 5	NED; 2	SWE; 8	SWE; 2	FIN; 2	FIN; 3	GER; 6	GER; 1	ITA; 2	ITA; 4	USA; 3	USA; 2	CAN; 5	CAN; 1	UK; 8	UK; 2	BEL; 9	BEL; 2	LUX; 6	LUX; 6	CH; 5	CH -			3rd	202
1978	500cc	Suzuki	CH; 9	CH; 2	AUT; 8	AUT; 7	FRA; 6	FRA -	DEN; 4	DEN; 2	FIN -	FIN -	SWE -	SWE; 4	USA -	USA; 7	ITA -	ITA; 7	UK; 4	UK; 4	BEL -	BEL -	LUX; 3	LUX; 5	NED; 1	NED; 1			5th	124
1979	500cc	Suzuki	AUT; 3	AUT; 3	FRA; 7	FRA; 8	SWE; 4	SWE; 1	ITA; 10	ITA; 6	USA; 1	USA; 3	CAN; 2	CAN; 1	GER; 5	GER; 3	UK; 4	UK; 8	CH -	CH; 6	NED; 2	NED; 1	BEL -	BEL -	LUX -	LUX; 3			2nd	177
1980	500cc	Maico	CH; 9	CH -	AUT; 10	AUT; 3	FRA -	FRA -	SWE; 7	SWE -	FIN -	FIN -	ITA -	ITA -	NED; 5	NED -	USA -	USA -	CAN; 10	CAN -	GER -	GER -	BEL -	BEL -	LUX -	LUX -			14th	24
1981	500cc	Honda	AUT; 7	AUT -	CH -	CH -	FIN -	FIN -	SWE -	SWE; 3	ITA -	ITA -	FRA -	FRA -	USA; 4	USA; 7	UK -	UK; 8	NED; 7	NED; 5	CZE -	CZE; 6	BEL -	BEL -	LUX; 9	LUX -			10th	46
1982	500cc	Honda	FRA -	FRA -	NED -	NED -	SWE; 7	SWE -	FIN; 10	FIN -	AUT -	AUT -	ITA -	ITA -	GER -	GER -	USA -	USA -	CAN -	CAN -	UK; 10	UK; 7	BEL -	BEL -	LUX -	LUX -			21st	10
