= Adolf Weil (motorcyclist) =

German motorcycle racer

- Nationality: German
- Born: 25 December 1938 Solingen, Germany
- Died: 12 May 2011 (aged 72) Solingen, Germany

Motocross career
- Years active: 1964, 1966–1978
- Teams: Maico
- Wins: 7

Adolf Weil (25 December 1938 – 12 May 2011) was a German professional motocross racer. He competed in the FIM Motocross World Championships between 1960 and 1978, most prominently as a member of the Maico factory racing team. Nicknamed of the “Iron Man of Motocross” for the longevity of his racing career, Weil was one of the most accomplished West German motocross racers of the 1970s.

== Motorsports career ==
Weil was born on December 25, 1938, in Solingen, Germany. He competed in his first Motocross World Championship event at the 1960 250cc West German Grand Prix as a 21-year-old privateer aboard a Maico motorcycle. He first came to prominence after placing third behind perennial World Championship contenders, Joël Robert (ČZ) and Torsten Hallman (Husqvarna) at the 1968 250cc West German Grand Prix.

After finishing the season ranked thirteenth in the 250cc world championships, Weil participated in the 1968 Inter-AM series in the United States. The Inter-AM was an international series established as a pilot event to help establish motocross in the United States by Edison Dye, the American importer for Husqvarna motorcycles. At the Akron, Ohio round of the Inter-AM series, Weil defeated the reigning 250cc World Champion, Joël Robert. Robert was considered to be the fastest motocross racer in the world at the time, but he was often hampered by his lackadaisical attitude towards physical fitness training as well as numerous mechanical issues he endured with his ČZ motorcycle. Weil then took the overall victory in both 250 and 500 classes at the final round, at Saddleback Park in Southern California.

Weil was 30-years-old when he began his first full World Championship season as a Maico factory team rider in 1969. He won the first overall victory of his career by winning both motos at the 1969 250cc West German Grand Prix. In the 1969 500cc Motocross World Championship, Weil placed 14th in the season final points standings with his best result being a third place behind Roger De Coster (ČZ) and John Banks (BSA) at the 500cc Belgian Grand Prix. The Belgian Grand Prix was held on a rugged, narrow track in the forests surrounding the picturesque hilltop Citadel of Namur. First held in 1947, the Namur Grand Prix was revered by motocross enthusiasts in the same manner that auto racing enthusiasts considered the Monaco Grand Prix to be the crown jewel of the Formula One season.

Weil improved to a sixth-place ranking in the 1970 500cc Motocross World Championship, including a second-place finish behind the eventual World Champion, Bengt Åberg (Husqvarna) at the 500c West German Grand Prix, and another second-place behind his Maico teammate Åke Jonsson at the 500cc East German Grand Prix.

In 1971, Weil finished on the podium in seven of the twelve Grand Prix races including an overall victory at the 500cc West German Grand Prix in Bielstein. He finished the season ranked third in the 500cc World Championship behind Roger De Coster (Suzuki) and Åke Jonsson (Maico). After the world championship season ended, he participated in the 1971 Trans-AMA series in the United States where he won two rounds and ended the series in second place behind Sylvain Geboers (Suzuki).

His inconsistent results in 1972 saw him drop to eighth place in the season final points standings, however he posted second-place finishes at the Swedish and French Grand Prix races. Weil was invited to compete in the 1972 250cc West German Grand Prix where he defeated Robert in the first heat, however he was excluded from the results as he was competing for the 500cc Motocross World Championship.

Weil had his best season in 1973 when he switched to the 250cc class and scored three Grand Prix victories in Italy, Russia and Austria. Unfortunately for Weil, at the third round in Belgium Yamaha introduced a new and innovative rear suspension with a single shock absorber that would revolutionize the sport of motocross. Yamaha factory rider, Håkan Andersson took advantage of the new technology to win six Grand Prix victories and clinch the 1973 250cc World Championship. After finishing the season ranked second to Andersson in the world championships, Weil won the 1973 Trans-AMA series with five overall victories to claim the series title over his Maico teammates Gerrit Wolsink and Willy Bauer.

At an age when many of his contemporaries had retired, Weil continued to race in the World Championships well into his thirties, earning himself the nickname of the “Iron Man of Motocross”. Weil became the oldest competitor in FIM history to win a 250cc Motocross Grand Prix race when, he won the 1973 250cc Austrian Grand Prix at the age of 34 years and 244 days.

Weil returned to the 500cc class in 1974 where he won the 500cc West German Grand Prix, however the season was dominated by Heikki Mikkola (Husqvarna) and Roger De Coster (Suzuki), who won 17 of the 22 races. He finished the season ranked third in the World Championship. Weil was the top individual points scorer at the 1974 Trophée des Nations event, winning both motos to help the German team finish second to the Belgian team. Weil placed third in the 1974 Trans-AMA motocross series behind Suzuki teammates Roger De Coster and Gerrit Wolsink.

Weil continued to race competitively until 1976, when he became the oldest 500cc Grand Prix winner in the history of the Motocross World Championships with a victory at the 1976 500cc French Grand Prix at the age of 37. He finished the 1976 season ranked third behind Suzuki teammates Roger De Coster and Gerrit Wolsink.

In 1976, Weil was awarded the Silver Laurel Leaf, the highest state award for athletic performance in Germany. He ended his professional motocross racing career after the 1978 season at the age of 39. Weil became so synonymous with Maico motorcycles that the company named the Maico AW model in his honor. He won 21 individual races and seven Grand Prix overall victories during his career in the Motocross World Championships. While he was never able to win a World Championship title, Weil was a 14-time German Motocross National Champion. After retiring from competition, he operated a motorcycle business with his two sons Frank and Jürgen in his hometown of Solingen, Germany.

Weil died in Solingen, Germany on 12 May 2011 at the age of 72.

== Motocross Grand Prix Results ==
Points system from 1952 to 1968:

Position	1st	2nd	3rd	4th	5th	6th
Points	8	6	4	3	2	1

Points system from 1969 to 1980:

Position	1	2	3	4	5	6	7	8	9	10
Points	15	12	10	8	6	5	4	3	2	1

Year	Class	Team	1		2		3		4		5		6		7		8		9		10		11		12		13		14		15		Pos	Pts
Year	Class	Team	R1	R2	R1	R2	R1	R2	R1	R2	R1	R2	R1	R2	R1	R2	R1	R2	R1	R2	R1	R2	R1	R2	R1	R2	R1	R2	R1	R2	R1	R2	Pos	Pts
1964	250cc	Maico	ESP -	ESP -	BEL; 13	BEL -	CH -	CH -	CZE -	CZE -	GER; 6	GER -	LUX; 13	LUX -	ITA -	ITA -	UK -	UK -	SWE -	SWE -	FIN -	FIN -	USR -	USR -	POL -	POL -	GDR -	GDR -	FRA -	FRA -			-	0
1966	250cc	Montesa	ESP -	ESP; 15	FRA -	FRA -	BEL -	BEL -	CH -	CH -	CZE -	CZE -	GER -	GER -	NED; 11	NED -	LUX -	LUX -	ITA -	ITA -	POL -	POL -	GDR -	GDR -	SWE -	SWE -	FIN -	FIN -	USR -	USR -	AUT -	AUT -	-	0
1966	500cc	Maico	CH -	CH -	AUT -	AUT -	ITA -	ITA -	DEN -	DEN -	SWE -	SWE -	FIN -	FIN -	GDR -	GDR -	CZE -	CZE -	USR -	USR -	UK -	UK -	NED -	NED -	BEL -	BEL -	LUX -	LUX -	GER; 5	GER; 4			19th	3
1967	250cc	Maico	ESP; 5	ESP; 19	CH -	CH; 5	FRA; 11	FRA; 29	BEL; 10	BEL; 14	GER; 3	GER -	NED -	NED -	ITA -	ITA -	UK -	UK -	SWE -	SWE -	FIN -	FIN -	USR -	USR -	POL -	POL -							-	0
1967	500cc	Maico	AUT -	AUT -	ITA -	ITA -	SWE -	SWE -	CZE -	CZE -	USR -	USR -	FRA -	FRA -	GER -	GER; 3	UK -	UK -	BEL -	BEL -	LUX -	LUX -	CH -	CH -									-	0
1968	250cc	Maico	ESP; 7	ESP; 8	BEL -	BEL -	CZE -	CZE -	FRA -	FRA -	NED; 15	NED; 18	GER; 2	GER; 3	LUX; 9	LUX; 5	POL -	POL -	USR -	USR -	YUG -	YUG -	FIN -	FIN -	SWE -	SWE -	UK -	UK -	AUT -	AUT -			13th	6
1968	500cc	Maico	AUT; 12	AUT; 5	ITA -	ITA -	SWE -	SWE -	FIN -	FIN -	GDR -	GDR -	CZE -	CZE -	UK -	UK -	GER -	GER; 1	FRA -	FRA -	NED -	NED -	BEL -	BEL -	LUX -	LUX -	CH -	CH -					20th	2
1969	250cc	Maico	ESP -	ESP -	CH -	CH -	YUG -	YUG -	CZE -	CZE -	POL -	POL -	GER; 1	GER; 1	NED -	NED -	FRA -	FRA -	UK -	UK -	SWE -	SWE -	FIN -	FIN -	USR -	USR -							14th	16
1969	500cc	Maico	AUT; 36	AUT; 3	SWE; 4	SWE; 7	NED -	NED -	ITA; 17	ITA; 12	CZE; 11	CZE; 2	USR -	USR -	GER; 4	GER -	BEL; 3	BEL; 3	LUX; 10	LUX -	FRA -	FRA; 3	CH; 2	CH -	GDR -	GDR -							14th	4
1970	250cc	Maico	ESP -	ESP -	FRA -	FRA -	BEL; 7	BEL; 7	YUG -	YUG -	ITA -	ITA -	USR -	USR -	POL -	POL -	UK -	UK -	FIN -	FIN -	GDR -	GDR -	CH -	CH -	AUT -	AUT -							22nd	4
1970	500cc	Maico	CH -	CH -	AUT; 8	AUT; 10	NED; 5	NED; 30	FRA; 2	FRA; 3	FIN -	FIN -	SWE -	SWE -	CZE; 6	CZE; 4	USR -	USR -	GER; 3	GER; 1	GDR; 3	GDR; 3	BEL; 2	BEL; 3	LUX; 1	LUX -							6th	55
1971	500cc	Maico	ITA; 2	ITA; 2	AUT; 3	AUT; 2	SWE; 3	SWE; 5	FIN; 2	FIN; 3	CZE; 3	CZE; 1	USR; 3	USR; 4	GDR; 5	GDR -	UK -	UK -	GER; 1	GER; 2	BEL; 4	BEL -	LUX; 3	LUX; 18	NED; 2	NED; 6							3rd	90
1972	250cc	Maico	ESP -	ESP -	FRA -	FRA -	NED -	NED -	CZE -	CZE -	YUG -	YUG -	GER; 1*	GER; 2*	POL -	POL -	USR -	USR -	FIN -	FIN -	SWE -	SWE -	UK -	UK -	CH -	CH -							-	0
1972	500cc	Maico	AUT -	AUT -	CH; 4	CH -	SWE; 3	SWE; 1	FRA; 2	FRA; 2	USR -	USR -	CZE; 4	CZE -	UK; 2	UK; 4	GER -	GER -	GDR -	GDR -	BEL; 3	BEL; 4	LUX -	LUX; 1									8th	42
1973	250cc	Maico	ESP; 3	ESP; 1	ITA; 4	ITA; 2	BEL; 5	BEL; 3	CH; 2	CH; 2	POL; 4	POL -	YUG -	YUG -	FRA; 1	FRA; 2	FIN; 2	FIN -	USR; 1	USR; 1	SWE; 5	SWE; 4	AUT; 1	AUT; 2									2nd	157
1974	500cc	Maico	AUT; 2	AUT; 2	FRA -	FRA; 7	ITA; 3	ITA -	DEN; 2	DEN; 6	CZE; 3	CZE; 2	GER; 1	GER; 2	UK; 3	UK -	USA; 7	USA; 6	NED; 5	NED -	BEL -	BEL; 3	LUX; 3	LUX; 4									3rd	133
1975	250cc	Maico	ESP -	ESP; 1	AUT; 10	AUT; 8	BEL; 2	BEL; 5	CZE; 5	CZE -	POL; 3	POL -	YUG; 2	YUG -	GER; 6	GER -	UK; 7	UK -	FRA; 1	FRA; 3	SWE; 4	SWE; 2	FIN; 5	FIN; 6	CH; 2	CH; 6							4th	129
1976	500cc	Maico	CH; 6	CH; 2	FRA; 1	FRA; 2	ITA; 7	ITA; 3	AUT; 1	AUT; 7	SWE; 3	SWE; 2	FIN -	FIN; 7	GER -	GER; 4	USA -	USA; 6	CAN; 8	CAN -	UK -	UK; 1	BEL; 2	BEL; 10	LUX; 3	LUX -							3rd	141
1977	500cc	Maico	AUT -	AUT -	NED -	NED -	SWE -	SWE -	FIN; 9	FIN; 7	GER -	GER -	ITA; 9	ITA; 6	USA -	USA -	CAN -	CAN -	UK; 10	UK; 5	BEL; 6	BEL; 4	LUX; 7	LUX; 8	CH -	CH; 6							10th	45
1978	500cc	Maico	CH -	CH -	AUT -	AUT -	FRA -	FRA -	DEN -	DEN -	FIN -	FIN -	SWE; 7	SWE; 8	USA -	USA -	ITA; 5	ITA; 10	UK -	UK -	BEL -	BEL -	LUX -	LUX -	NED -	NED -							15th	14
*Weil is invited to compete in the 1972 250cc West German Grand Prix in which he is awarded second place, however he is not awarded points since he is competing for the 1972 500cc World Championship. Sources:
