= Jimmy Weinert =

American motorcycle racer

- Nationality: American
- Born: August 14, 1951 (age 75) Middletown, New York

Motocross career
- Years active: 1972–1980
- Teams: Kawasaki, Yamaha
- Championships: AMA 500cc – 1974, 1975; AMA 250cc Supercross – 1976
- Wins: 22

Jimmy Weinert (born August 14, 1951) is an American former professional motocross and supercross racer. He competed in the AMA Motocross Championships from 1972 to 1980. Weinert won 22 AMA Nationals and three AMA national championships during his racing career. In 1973, Weinert became the first American to defeat international-level riders in the Trans-AMA motocross series. That victory marked a turning point that brought American motocross up to par with the then dominant European riders.

== Motocross career ==
Born in Middletown, New York, Weinert was the son of a motorcycle dealer and began riding at an early age. Early in his career, he split his time between motocross and dirt track oval racing however, an injury while racing on the high speed dirt track ovals convinced him to concentrate on the burgeoning sport of motocross.

Weinert began racing professionally in 1970 riding a CZ. He was the second-best American rider behind Gary Jones (Yamaha) in the 1971 Inter-AMA motocross series. The series featured some of the top competitors from the Motocross World Championships racing against the top American riders. As the AMA Motocross Championship would not be established until 1972, Jones was crowned the U.S. 250 Motocross National Champion, based upon being the highest placed American born rider in the series. In 1972 he again finished runner up to Jones in the inaugural AMA 250cc motocross national championship. At the end of the 1972 season, Weinert along with Jones, Brad Lackey and Jim Pomeroy were selected by the AMA to be the first American team to represent the United States at the Motocross des Nations where the team posted a seventh place result.

Weinert was hired by the Kawasaki factory racing team for the 1974 AMA 500cc national championship season. He won four consecutive races to overtake the early championship points leader, Tony DiStefano (ČZ), to win his first National Championship. A photograph taken during the 1974 season by journalist Charlie Morey showing Weinert and DiStefano battling for the race lead in a right hand turn with Weinert's handlebar just inches away from DiStefano's chin, became one of the most iconic photographs in American motocross history.

Weinert along with Brad Lackey, Jim Pomeroy and Tony DiStefano represented the United States at the 1974 Motocross des Nations event where they finished in an impressive second-place, marking the best-ever result at the time for an American team at the event. He successfully defended his 500cc national championship title in 1975. He also won the 1976 AMA 250cc Supercross championship.

In the 1979 Supercross championship, Weinert won the Oakland Coliseum round by using a scoop paddle rear tire to win both his heat race and the main event. Within a few weeks, the AMA had banned the use of paddle tires. His last national victory came at the 1979 Daytona Supercross race. Nagging injuries as well as a new generation of younger competitors such as Bob Hannah and Kent Howerton led Weinert to retire in 1980.

Weinert continues his involvement in the sport competing in vintage motocross events and operating a motocross training facility in Maysville, North Carolina. In 1999, he was inducted into the AMA Motorcycle Hall of Fame.
