= 1974 AMA Motocross National Championship season =

1974 AMA Motocross Championship season

Seasons
- ← 1973 1975 →

The 1974 AMA Motocross Championship season was the 3rd AMA Motocross National Championship season.

== Summary ==
The AMA Motocross continued to expand in 1974 with the addition of the 125cc class. The AMA made a controversial decision allowing only American citizens to compete for the motocross national championship. The decision would exclude the defending 500cc national champion Dutchman Pierre Karsmakers who, was credited with helping raise the level of American motocross by stressing the importance of physical fitness and machine preparation.

Although he was excluded from the overall results, Karsmakers competed for Yamaha in the 250cc class and won three of the nine rounds. Despite not having won a race overall, Can-Am's Gary Jones rode consistently to secure his third consecutive 250cc national championship riding three different brands of motorcycles. Can-Am hired second-ranked Marty Tripes away from the Husqvarna team before the last race of the season. With Can-Am rider Jimmy Ellis finishing the season ranked third, Can-Am would sweep the top three positions in the 250cc national championship although, Tripes rode most of the season for Husqvarna.

In the 500cc national championship, privateer rider Tony DiStefano led the championship for most of the year on a ČZ before an injury relegated him to second place behind Kawasaki factory rider Jimmy Weinert. The Honda factory team dominated the inaugural 125cc championship with rider Marty Smith leading a Honda sweep of the top four positions.

== Nationals ==
Round	Date	Location	500cc		250cc		125cc		Report
Round	Date	Location	Winner	Team	Winner	Team	Winner	Team	Report
1	April 8	Rancho Cordova, California	(United States) Mike Hartwig	Yamaha	(United States) Billy Grossi	Honda	(United States) Marty Smith	Honda	Report
2	April 14	Moorpark, California	(United States) Tony DiStefano	ČZ	(Netherlands) Pierre Karsmakers	Yamaha			Report
3	April 28	Buchanan, Michigan	(United States) Mike Hartwig	Yamaha	(United States) Kenny Zahrt	Bultaco			Report
4	May 5	Bruceton Mills, West Virginia	(United States) Tony DiStefano	ČZ	(Netherlands) Pierre Karsmakers	Yamaha			Report
5	May 19	Hamersville, Ohio	(United States) Jimmy Weinert	Kawasaki	(Netherlands) Pierre Karsmakers	Yamaha			Report
6	June 30	Salt Lake City, Utah					(United States) Marty Smith	Honda	Report
7	July 6	Baldwin, Kansas					(United States) Jimmy Ellis	Can-Am	Report
8	July 21	Lexington, Ohio					(United States) Tim Hart	Yamaha	Report
9	August 11	Delta, Ohio	(United States) Jimmy Weinert	Kawasaki	(United States) Jimmy Ellis	Can-Am			Report
10	August 18	Mexico, New York	(United States) Jimmy Weinert	Kawasaki	(United States) Marty Tripes	Husqvarna			Report
11	August 25	Hillsboro, Ohio	(United States) Jimmy Weinert	Kawasaki	(United States) Jimmy Ellis	Can-Am			Report
12	September 2	New Orleans, Louisiana	(United States) Gary Semics	Husqvarna	(United States) Kent Howerton	Husqvarna			Report

== Final standings ==
500cc
Pos	Rider	Team	Points
1	(United States) Jimmy Weinert	Kawasaki	900
2	(United States) Tony DiStefano	ČZ	780
3	(United States) Steve Stackable	Maico	680
4	(United States) Gary Semics	Husqvarna	620
5	(United States) Mike Hartwig	Yamaha	507
6	(United States) Bryar Holcomb	Bultaco/Maico	395
7	(United States) Terry Clark	Husqvarna	295
8	(United States) Rex Staten	Maico	257
9	(United States) Gary Chaplin	Maico	200
10	(United States) Mike Runyard	Suzuki	174

250cc
Pos	Rider	Team	Points
1	(United States) Gary Jones	Can-Am	800
2	(United States) Marty Tripes	Husqvarna/Can-Am	576
3	(United States) Jimmy Ellis	Can-Am	430
4	(United States) Rich Thorwaldson	Suzuki	430
5	(United States) Billy Grossi	Honda	390
6	(United States) Kent Howerton	Husqvarna	367
7	(United States) Peter Lamppu	Montesa	315
8	(United States) Frank Stacy	Maico	285
9	(United States) Kenny Zahrt	Bultaco	257
10	(United States) Ron Pomeroy	Bultaco	254

125cc
Pos	Rider	Team	Points
1	(United States) Marty Smith	Honda	420
2	(United States) Bruce McDougal	Honda	240
3	(United States) Chuck Bower	Honda	235
4	(United States) Mikey Boone	Honda	200
5	(United States) Tim Hart	Yamaha	196
6	(United States) Jimmy Ellis	Can-Am	167
7	(United States) Jeff Foland	Honda	153
8	(United States) Dan Turner	Husqvarna/Honda	126
9	(United States) Robert Haag	Husqvarna	100
10	(United States) Vincent Clark	Suzuki	94

== See also ==
- 1974 FIM Motocross World Championship
- 1974 Trans-AMA motocross series
