= Gary Jones (motorcyclist) =

American motorcycle racer

- Nationality: United States
- Born: April 22, 1952 (age 74) California, United States

Motocross career
- Years active: 1969–1976
- Teams: Yamaha, Honda, Can-Am
- Championships: AMA 250cc: 1972, 1973, 1974

Gary Jones (born April 22, 1952) is an American former professional motocross and desert racer. He competed in the AMA Motocross Championships from 1971 to 1976. Jones is notable for winning the inaugural AMA 250cc motocross national championship in 1972. Jones then successfully defended his national championship in 1973 and 1974, winning three consecutive 250cc motocross national championships while competing on three different brands of motorcycles, a feat which has never been repeated in AMA motocross history. He was inducted into the AMA Motorcycle Hall of Fame in 2000.

== Motorcycling career ==
=== Early life ===
Jones grew up Southern California where his father, Don Jones was a BSA motorcycle dealer who also ran a motorcycle salvage and repair shop in San Gabriel, California just east of Los Angeles. Growing up in a motorcycle salvage yard meant that Jones and his brother Dewayne became adept at fabricating parts and modifying motorcycles. They never received new motorcycles as, their father told them that if they wanted a motorcycle, they could cobble one together from parts. His first motorcycle was a 125cc Villiers-Dot that he shared with his brother. He began racing professionally at the age of 15, competing on a BSA Victor in local TT, scrambles and flat track racing. He also competed in motorcycle speedway races riding a J.A.P. motorcycle.

=== Developing the Yamaha YZ motocrosser ===
In the late 1960s, his father became one of the first Southern California distributors for Yamaha motorcycles. When the Yamaha DT-1 was introduced in 1968, Jones and his brother began using them to compete in the newly introduced sport of motocross. With his and his father's vast experience at fabricating parts and modifying motorcycles, the Jones family developed the DT-1 into competitive racing motorcycles by strengthening and lowering the frame and using weight saving components.

The Jones family's modifications proved to be so successful that his race results came to the attention of the Yamaha factory who asked to take their motorcycle back to Japan for testing. The motorcycle that Jones and his father developed helped to further the development of motocross bikes in the late 1960s and early 1970s, and was to become the basis for the YZ range of models.

Although there was no American motocross championship series in 1971, Jones is recognized as the 250cc National Champion by virtue of being the top-placed American rider in the 1971 Inter-AMA motocross series which featured European riders touring America after the European-based World Championship season had ended. He also competed in the 500cc class, finishing second to Brad Lackey.

The following year, the AMA introduced 250cc and 500cc outdoor motocross national championships. Jones won the 1972 250cc title on a Yamaha, becoming the first-ever 250cc U.S. Motocross National Champion. He also finished second to Brad Lackey in the 500cc motocross national championship.

Jones then competed in the 1972 Inter-AMA series which featured the top European motocross riders visiting the United States after the finish of the F.I.M. motocross world championships in Europe. Some of the European competitors included; Torleif Hansen, Arne Kring, Gunnar Lindstrom, Dave Bickers, and four-time FIM 250cc World Champion Torsten Hallman. At the time, it was considered a significant accomplishment for an American rider to finish among the top five against the more experienced European competitors.

At the first race of the series in Boise, Idaho, Jones defeated former world champions Hallman and Bickers to win all three races. His impressive performance marked the first time an American rider had scored an overall victory in an AMA-FIM sanctioned motocross event. Because the Inter-AMA series lacked prestige of an international event, his victory didn't resonate within the American motorcycling community in the same manner as Jim Pomeroy's later victory at the 1973 250cc Spanish motocross Grand Prix or Jimmy Weinert's victory at the 1973 Trans-AMA 500cc race in Rio Bravo, Texas.

Jones' victory against European riders was also overshadowed 13 days later by 16-year-old Marty Tripes' historical victory at the first Super Bowl of Motocross on June 8, 1972, an event that marked the creation of a new sub-discipline of motocross that became known as supercross. Jones considered his victory against a field of top competitors in the Boise Inter-AMA event to be his proudest racing achievement.

Jones and Hallman fought for the championship points lead until the final race of the series when Jones prevailed ahead of Hallman and third-place finisher, Arne Kring. Also in 1972, Jones travelled to Europe as a member of the first American team to compete in the Motocross des Nations event.

=== Move to Honda ===
When Yamaha offered Jones a contract for the 1973 season that didn't include his father and brother, Jones instead accepted an offer to race for American Honda, insisting that his family members were part of a package deal. Soichiro Honda sought Jones and his father's help to develop the new Honda CR series of motocross bikes. When the hand-built, custom racing motorcycles proved to be too brittle, the Jones family reverted to modifying production Honda CRs. As they had done with Yamaha's motocross bikes, Jones and his father developed the Honda into a winning motorcycle. He successfully defended his 250cc crown, riding the Honda CR250M to six consecutive national race victories to win the 1973 250cc motocross national championship.

When Honda failed to provide Jones with a 500cc motorcycle for the 1973 Trans-AMA series, he purchased a Maico motorcycle and raced it with all the badges removed while wearing his Honda team apparel. This act provoked Honda to end their association with the Jones family.

=== Can-Am team and third championship ===
Jones was then contracted by the Bombardier Corporation (manufacturer of Ski-Doo snowmobiles), to race for their recently formed Can-Am motorcycle division. Dutch rider Pierre Karsmakers had competed in the 1973 AMA National Championship under an AMA license and was controversially declared the "Top American" finisher in the 1973 Trans-AMA motocross series. In response to the controversy, the AMA implemented a new rule stating that foreign riders must reside in the United States for at least two years before they were eligible to earn points in the American national championships. Karsmakers had been prepared to compete against Jones for the 1974 250cc National Championship, but the new rule would exclude him from being registered in the points standings.

Despite Jones' exclusion from the overall results, Karsmakers competed for the Yamaha factory team and won three of the nine rounds of the 250cc national championship. Although Jones didn't win a race overall, he rode consistently to secure his third consecutive 250cc national championship for a third manufacturer. When he suffered a severe leg injury at the season opening Daytona supercross in 1975, Can-Am bought out his contract. Jones took the $70,000 and along with his father, started their own motorcycle company.

=== Later career ===
At the time Cooper Motorcycles was going out of business, so the Jones family bought the Mexican-based company and used the Frank Cooper designed enduro bike as a prototype for the first Jones-Islo motorcycle (the name would later be changed to Ammex, which stood for American-Mexican). Their intent was to achieve sales success by having Jones compete aboard the motorcycles in the AMA motocross national championship. The Jones family significantly improved the Ammex over the previous Cooper model. Jones competed on an Ammex motorcycle during the 1976 250cc motocross national championship with his best result being a 10th place at the Sears Point race. However, the brand failed when the Mexican peso was devalued in 1976.

In addition to racing motocross, Jones was also an expert desert racer. In 1972 he won the Baja 500 and the Baja 250. He also won the Mint 400.

Having retired from professional competition, Jones continues his involvement in the sport by working for motorcycle accessory companies and as a test rider for motorcycle magazines. He competes in motocross and desert races, winning World Vet Championships several times. In 2000, he was inducted into the AMA Motorcycle Hall of Fame, and in 2004, he was inducted into the Motocross Walk Of Fame. The AMA named the championship trophy for winning 250 National Motocross Championship, the Gary Jones Cup, in his honor.
