= Kent Howerton =

American motorcycle racer

- Nationality: American
- Born: July 11, 1954 (age 72) Wichita, Kansas

Motocross career
- Years active: 1973 - 1988
- Teams: Husqvarna, Suzuki, Kawasaki
- Championships: AMA 500cc - 1976 AMA 250cc - 1980, 1981
- Wins: 32

Kent Howerton (born July 11, 1954) is an American former professional motocross racer. He competed in the AMA Motocross Championships from 1973 to 1988. Howerton is notable for being a three-time motocross national champion.

== Motocross career ==
Born in Wichita, Kansas, Howerton was raised in San Antonio, Texas, where he began racing motocross. In 1973 he began competing in the AMA motocross national championship series, and by 1974 he had won his first national race in the 250cc class. For the 1975 season, he was offered a job to ride for the Husqvarna factory racing team and finished the season is second place behind Tony DiStefano. Howerton would win the 500cc AMA Motocross National Championship in 1976 for Husqvarna.

Howerton along with teammates Tony DiStefano, Steve Stackable and Gary Semics, represented the United States at the 1977 Motocross des Nations and Trophy des Nations events where they scored impressive second-place finishes in France and Holland, at a time when American motocross racers were still seen as less experienced than their European rivals.

Suzuki signed Howerton for the 1978 season and he went on to win the 1980 and 1981 250cc AMA Motocross National Championship. He is remembered for his battles with Bob Hannah in the early 1980s. At the time of his retirement in 1984, he was second on the all-time AMA 250cc motocross win list. In SuperCross, he placed second in the 1980 AMA SuperCross series with five wins.

In 2000, Howerton was inducted into the AMA Motorcycle Hall of Fame.
