= Can-Am motorcycles =

Canadian brand of motor vehicles

Can-Am Motorcycles
- Headquarters: Valcourt, Canada
- Products: Motorcycles
- Parent: Bombardier Corporation
- Website: can-am.brp.com/us/en/

Can-Am is a Canadian subsidiary of Bombardier Recreational Products (BRP) founded in 1972 and based in Valcourt, Quebec. The company produced off-road motorcycles from 1972 to 1987. In 1997, the company was reformed and began production of ATV vehicles as well as the Can-Am Spyder three-wheeled motorcycle. In 2024 Can-Am released two new electric motorcycle models.

== History ==
=== Brand history ===
Can-Am was created as a subsidiary of the Bombardier Corporation in 1972. The barn that housed the original Can-Am headquarters still exists at the Bombardier test facility within the Circuit Yvon Duhamel and is located a few miles south of Valcourt, Quebec. The right side of the barn housed the offices for design and engineering, and the left side was used for fabrication. Can-Am's name was the result of a Bombardier employee competition based on the anticipated Canadian vs. American market, though the existence of the Can-Am racing series necessitated the purchase of rights to the name.

Based on the Bultaco design principle of a standard-size frame that could accommodate a range of differently sized engines, engineers Gary Robison, Bob Fisher, and Camille Picard, and former 500cc Motocross World Champion Jeff Smith designed a competition motorcycle from scratch using engines supplied by the Austrian firm, Rotax, another Bombardier subsidiary. Their design featured steering head bearing cups that allowed for the adjustment of the steering head angle; these were mainly driven by simplified production on the assembly line.

The machines made an immediate impact, with riders winning Gold, Silver and bronze medals at the International Six Days Trial. The International Six Days Trial, now known as the International Six Days Enduro, is a form of off-road motorcycle Olympics which is the oldest annual competition sanctioned by the FIM dating back to 1913.

In 1974, the Can-Am factory racing team swept the AMA 250cc motocross national championship with Can-Am riders Gary Jones, Marty Tripes and Jimmy Ellis, finishing first, second and third in the championship although, Tripes had raced for most of the season on a Husqvarna motorcycle before being hired by Can-Am for the last race of the season.

Can-Am enduro rider Skip Olson finished second to Dick Burleson in the 1976 AMA Enduro national championship. Can-Am's motorcycle racing success enhanced the brand's image and they gained a reputation for their high horsepower outputs. In 1983, Can-Am released a 250 cc road racing motorcycle. Using two 125 cc Rotax motors with a conjoined crankshaft, the motorcycle featured a bespoke frame with an aluminum swingarm.

When the 1973 oil crisis precipitated a decrease in sales of recreational vehicles, Bombardier was forced to reduce their snowmobile and motorcycle production. Bombardier then shifted its priority from recreational products towards the transit equipment industry and then, several years later, into aircraft manufacturing. As a result, investments in product development were reduced substantially and, Can-Am was unable to keep pace with Japanese manufacturers as rapid advancements in motocross technology progressed during the 1970s and 1980s. In 1983, Bombardier licensed the brand and outsourced development and production of the Can-Am motorcycles to Armstrong-CCM Motorcycles of Lancashire, England. 1987 was the final year of Can-Am motorcycle production.

=== Rebirth and rebranding ===
In 2006, Bombardier reintroduced the Can-Am brand with its Can-Am Off-Road range of all-terrain vehicles (ATV). In 2007, the Can-Am brand was also used for the Can-Am Spyder, a new three-wheeled roadster.

After 35 years of no two-wheeled vehicles in production, Can-Am announced in March of 2022 that two new models of electric motorcycles would be released. The two motorcycles being the Can-Am Pulse, an electric, naked-styled commuter, and the Origin, an electric adventure bike. They began production in 2024 and were released for the 2025 model year with two trim levels each. 2026 saw a continued production of the two motorcycles with a reduced price, with the high price being the most consistent complaint for the previous model year.
