= Carlsbad Raceway =

Motorsport facility in Carlsbad, United States

- Opened: 1964
- Closed: 2004

Drag Strip
- Surface: Paved
- Length: 0.250 mi (0.402 km)

Motocross
- Surface: Dirt

Carlsbad Raceway was a motorsport facility located in Carlsbad, California, United States. Carlsbad Raceway featured a ¼ mile (1320 feet, 402 m) dragstrip and motocross track, which first opened in 1964. Motorsports activities were shut down in August 2004. The Carlsbad Raceway Business Park was erected on the land once occupied by the motorsports division.

== History ==
The land was originally purchased by Larry Grismer and Sandy Belond in 1961 and in 1964 they opened Carlsbad Raceway. The land was sold in 1986 to a third party and Carlsbad Raceway was leasing the property to use on a month-to-month basis until subsequently closing in August 2004 when the property owners decided to develop the land.
