= Bob Hannah =

American motorcycle racer

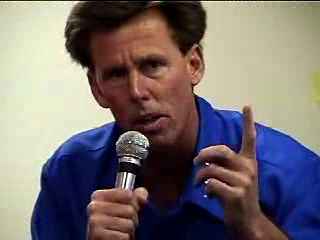
- Nationality: (United States) American
- Born: September 26, 1956 (age 69) Lancaster, California, U.S.

Motocross career
- Years active: 1976 - 1989
- Teams: Yamaha, Honda, Suzuki
- Championships: AMA National 125cc - 1976 AMA National 250cc - 1978-1979 AMA 250cc Supercross - 1977-1979 Trans-AMA 500cc - 1978
- Wins: 70

Robert William Hannah (born September 26, 1956) is an American former professional motocross racer. He competed in the AMA Motocross Championships from 1975 to 1989, most notably as a member of the Yamaha factory racing team. He was one of the most successful motocross racers in AMA history, with 70 AMA race victories and seven championships.

Hannah was a brash and outspoken personality whose wild riding style, seemingly on the verge of losing control and often with his feet off the foot pegs, earned him the nickname, "Hurricane Hannah". His physical fitness, fierce determination on the race track and a hatred of losing, reshaped American motocross by boosting the speed and competition to higher levels. He was at the forefront of a surge in American motocross competition in the late 1970s and early 1980s that saw American racers overtake and surpass the previously dominant European motocross racers. Hannah was inducted into the AMA Motorcycle Hall of Fame in 1999 and the Motorsports Hall of Fame of America in 2000.

== Early motocross career ==
Hannah was born in Lancaster, California on the edge of the Mojave Desert. He grew up riding in the rugged Southern California deserts with his father, but because his father thought motocross was too dangerous, he didn't begin to compete in motocross racing until he was 18 years old and living on his own. A few weeks after his high school graduation, Hannah borrowed a friend’s 250cc CZ motorcycle on a challenge and won his first and only amateur motocross race on July 7, 1974, at Indian Dunes near Valencia, California, after which race officials told him he would have to move up to the expert class. In his next race, Hannah finished fourth. It would take several months before he won another event.

Mick McKee, whom Hannah credited for starting his professional career, took the young rider as a student and put him through a system of daily muscle and stamina-building workouts along with weekend trips to area motocross tracks to analyze, evaluate and improve Hannah’s evolving technique. McKee also introduced Hannah to Steve Hurd, a local motorcycle dealer, who sold him a new Husqvarna motocross bike and became a sponsor and parts supplier. Hannah worked as a welder, saving his money for six months before he could afford to purchase the Husqvarna.

Hannah’s hard work and training soon began to pay dividends over the spring and summer of 1975. At one point, he won 18 straight races in ten days by competing in two classes at each event. It wasn't long before Hannah caught the attention of Suzuki who brought a $700-a-month offer to test and race small displacement works-bikes. Remarkably, just 13 months removed from his amateur debut, Hannah entered his first AMA National event in San Antonio, Texas, at the 125cc Cycle-Rama on August 25, 1975, finishing in sixth place. However, at his next AMA National in New Orleans, Louisiana, he got a severe case of heat prostration and ended up in the hospital.

== Team Yamaha and motocross dominance ==
In late 1975, Yamaha, having lost veterans to other teams, offered Hannah a contract. Hannah took the unsigned $1,000-a-month offer to Suzuki hoping that they would match it. Suzuki declined and Yamaha, in December 1975, announced that the virtually unknown Hannah would be joining the team for the 1976 season.

Hannah began his rookie year by dominating the 500cc Florida Winter-AMA series, which was one of the most prestigious American motocross series of the era. In winning all five events, he became the first rider to sweep the series, inspiring Cycle News editor and contributor Jim Gianatsis to popularize the nickname “the Hurricane” for Hannah. (Note: Hannah claims that an announcer at Saddleback Motorcycle Park first gave him the nickname in 1975. A few others take credit for it. However, it was Gianatsis’ coverage of the 1976 Florida Winter-AMA series in Cycle News that brought the nickname into public view.)

Hannah had an equally impressive start to the 1976 AMA 125cc motocross season by winning the first race at Hangtown against Honda's defending National Champion, Marty Smith who had been favored to win his third consecutive National Championship. Hannah suffered a bad start in the first heat race, but put in an extremely impressive performance by passing almost the entire field of competitors to catch and then pass the race leader Smith. In the second heat race, Hannah and Smith engaged in a twenty minute duel for the race lead which ended when Smith's Honda broke down, allowing Hannah to take the overall victory. The result stunned many racing enthusiasts as, Smith had dominated the 125 class for two consecutive seasons while Hannah was still relatively unknown. Hannah won five of the eight 125cc Nationals that year enroute to his first national championship.

Hannah participated in his first Trans-AMA series winning the final event of the series in Phoenix, Arizona. He was also a member of the American team at both the Motocross des Nations and Trophée des Nations. However, Team USA fared poorly with Hannah himself remarking later that “I don't remember a single damn thing about those two races.” (Note: Hannah finished 10th and 20th for two motos at the Trophee des Nations and 12th and 18th at the Motocross des Nations.)

While successfully chasing the 1976 125cc title, Hannah had sporadically raced in both 250cc and 500cc displacement classes, even winning his first 250cc National at Appalachian Highlands Motorsports Park. But, in 1977, Hannah was determined to fully compete in them all. For the Florida Winter-AMA series, Hannah rode a production Yamaha YZ250 to win eight consecutive motos in taking the 250cc title. He won the AMA Supercross Championship in impressive fashion, taking six of the 10 rounds. As defending 125cc national champion, he won three of the six rounds. However, mechanical issues lead to a disastrous 24th place at the opening round at Hangtown. This put him in a points hole that he couldn't overcome, and he finished third for series. In the 500cc class, Hannah went into the last round just six points behind Marty Smith for the championship, but his motorcycle’s throttle cable malfunctioned while leading the first moto and left him unable to finish, ending his chances for the championship.

Hannah never really had a chance at the 1977 250cc National title. The AMA - fearing a Hannah sweep of every championship - started holding 125cc and 250cc events on the same day causing Yamaha to defer Hannah to the 125cc class when the two conflicted. The move by the AMA combined with the enormity of competing in so many races contributed to Hannah being a non-factor in the 250cc series, finishing overall in seventh place. However, Hannah became the first AMA competitor to win races in the 125cc, 250cc and 500cc classes in just one season.

Hannah capped off the year by giving Roger De Coster his strongest American challenge to date in the 1977 Trans-AMA series. Hannah won more motos than any other competitor in the series including De Coster, however, he didn't score points in two rounds due to mechanical failures allowing De Coster to win his fourth consecutive Trans-AMA title. At the time, De Coster said of Hannah, "Hannah's good, but he also thinks he's good, which is something that he shouldn't do. At least not until he has more experience to go along with it." Hannah finished second in the series barely holding off rival Marty Smith for the runner-up spot.

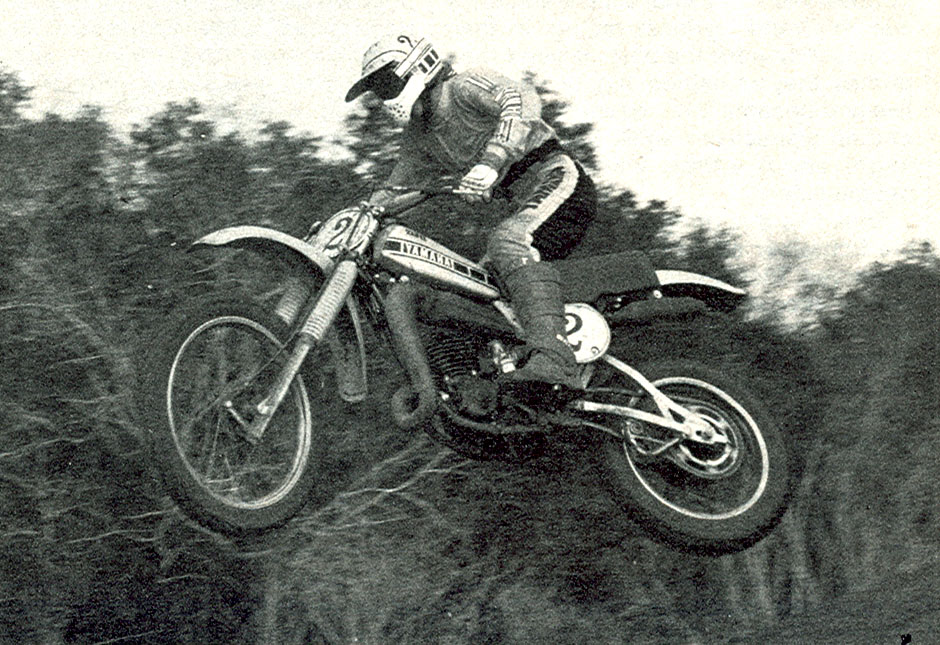
Hannah on a Yamaha

For the 1978 season, the AMA adopted a new rule that required all professional riders declare their class for the year putting an end to multiple outdoor class racing. Hannah chose to race in the 250cc class for which he would mostly compete for the remainder of his professional career. After underperforming in the first three rounds of the Supercross series, Hannah reeled off six consecutive victories and ran away with the championship. He continued to dominate his competition by winning eight consecutive 250cc outdoor Nationals, at that time a record. Hannah’s point lead became so insurmountable, he claimed the National title even while sitting out the last two rounds to heal an injured wrist.

At the end of the 1978 season, Hannah won the Trans-AMA Series over five-time world champion Roger De Coster, becoming the first American competitor to win the series in the nine-year history of the event. Hannah's victory at the Trans-AMA marked the end of the series as a confrontation between the best European and American motocross racers. Conceived as a series of match races held across the United States between the Europeans who dominated the sport and the young Americans who sought to emulate them, by the mid-1970s, American riders steadily improved their skill, and European riders found it increasingly difficult to earn enough money to make the trip to America worthwhile. Only three European riders came over to compete in the 1978 Trans-AMA Series due to the stiffening competition from American riders.

At the 1978 Motocross des Nations in Gaildorf, West Germany, Hannah had the rare opportunity to compete against reigning 500cc World Champion Heikki Mikkola, who was then near the peak of his racing career. Hannah let Mikkola know that he (Hannah) was going to win the event. Mikkola replied, “Let's see if you ride as good as you talk.” In the first race, Hannah grabbed an early lead however, Mikkola overtook him and pulled away for the win. Mikkola repeated the performance in the second race, passing Hannah en route to his second victory of the day.

== Water-skiing accident and troubles with Yamaha ==
Hannah's 1979 campaign was nothing less than a continuation of his prior year dominance. He won his third consecutive AMA Supercross series title and successfully defended his outdoor 250cc National title by earning victories in six of the 10 events. Hannah was the best motocross rider in the United States and arguably in the world. But at the height of his career, Hannah broke his leg in 12 places in a water-skiing accident in August that left him sidelined for a little more than a year. Doctors initially told Hannah he would never be able to race again. He was forced to sit out the entire 1980 Supercross and outdoor series while recuperating. During his recovery, he developed an interest in flying airplanes, and earned his pilot license.

Hannah returned to motocross in September 1980 at Silver Sands Cycle Park in Anderson, South Carolina where he placed third and first in the two motos of a 250cc pro event, battling a young up-and-coming David Bailey. Hannah also raced in the Trans-USA series (formerly Trans-AMA) and finished a respectable third place despite admitting that he had poor timing with the motorcycle and was out of shape from the layoff.

The year 1981 would not be the comeback for which Hannah would have hoped. Although he took his third Winter-AMA series title, he was only able to win one Supercross event and finished the series fifth overall. For the Nationals, Hannah and Kent Howerton became embroiled in a fierce race for the championship, battling round after round, often purposely ramming the other in one of the most competitive and hard-fought series in AMA history. Hannah took three rounds and made it close, but Howerton was the eventual winner of the series. For the Trans-USA series, Hannah was again unable to find winning form and finishing tied for fourth. The July 1981 issue of Motocross Action magazine included the coverline, “Hannah: Over the Hill?”. In explaining his mixed results that year, Hannah later blamed the motorcycle saying that it was 35 pounds too heavy and not as good as his YZ250 from two years earlier.

If 1981 was a difficult year for Hannah, 1982 may have been the lowest point his career. For the Supercross series, he finished ninth winning only one round. Yamaha team manager Kenny Clark moved Broc Glover to the 250cc class in the Nationals and Hannah to the 125cc class. Hannah had not raced 125’s in four years. Again, voicing displeasure over his motorcycle, Hannah struggled the entire season and did not win a single National for the first time and finished seventh for the series. Hannah called the move to the 125cc class a “stupid mistake.” It would be Hannah's last year racing for the Yamaha factory team. Hannah blamed the motorcycles, and Yamaha blamed Hannah for not winning. By mutual agreement, the year remaining on his contract was dissolved.

== Move to Honda ==
In November 1982, Honda announced it had signed Hannah to a three-year contract. Hannah was back on 250cc machines and wasted no time making a statement that he was still on his game. He started the season by winning the CMC Golden State series over David Bailey, Broc Glover and Ricky Johnson. His success continued on the AMA circuits. Both Supercross and National titles were his for the taking as he won five of the first 11 stadium events and six of eight 250cc Nationals and was leading both series going into a Supercross event in Orlando, Florida. Prior to the event, Hannah was asked to check the track before it opened to competitors. In negotiating a jump, he fell and injured both his left wrist and leg. The injury to his wrist proved to be significant and Hannah was forced to abandon competing in the remaining Supercross events, during which he was surpassed by both David Bailey and Mark Barnett for the Supercross title. Hannah determinedly raced the remaining National events, but was unable to effectively compete with his injured wrist and ended up third for the title. As later events would demonstrate, 1983 was Hannah’s last best chance to bring home a championship.

Injuries would continue to plague Hannah for the 1984 season. During the year, he suffered a broken pelvis, along with two broken wrists, a broken ankle and two broken ribs. His competitors started referring to him as “Brittle Bob” as he accumulated more injuries and missed more events. Hannah finished the season in tenth place for both Supercross and Nationals, his worst showing as a full-time competitor. At this time, he even contemplated retirement.

While Hannah continued to be among, if not the fastest competitor in motocross, injury and age were catching up. Just a few events into the 1985 Supercross series, Hannah was telling the press that it was going to be his last season for that circuit. He finished 11th overall although he did become the first three-time winner of the Daytona Supercross, the last of his 27 stadium wins. However, Hannah still had the speed, ability, and desire to compete with the younger riders in the outdoor Nationals. In the title hunt for much of the year, Hannah won his 37th and final AMA National at the age of 28 at the 250cc event held in Millville, Minnesota, and finished fourth overall for the season.

== Return to Suzuki and retirement ==
Hannah left his factory ride with Honda and signed with Suzuki to be a development rider and part-time racer in 1986. Over the next several years, he raced infrequently at AMA and Grand Prix events to the delight of his fans. And there were still the occasional magical moments. After years of bad luck and frustration at Unadilla Valley Sports Center, Hannah won the 1986 U.S. Grand Prix Championship when Johnny O’Mara ran out of gas on the last lap of the second moto allowing Hannah, then in second place, to slip by him for the victory.

In 1987, Hannah was selected to Team USA at the Motocross Des Nations, held for the first time in the U.S. It was a controversial pick for team manager Roger DeCoster. DeCoster had passed over two-time 125cc National Champion Micky Dymond in favor of Hannah who was well past his prime and had not competitively raced a 125cc displacement bike since 1982. But the track at Unadilla favored Hannah and he was motivated to prove wrong those critical of his selection. On race day, the weather was awful with rain turning the track into mud and ruts. At one point in the first moto, Hannah could not get up a slippery hill and had to turn around and go to the bottom and start over. In nearly last place early in the race, Hannah conjured up one of his come-from-behind charges, his feet off the pegs to maintain balance in the ruts. He managed fourth-place among 125cc bikes. (Note: At the 1987 Motocross des Nations, there were three motos: 125cc and 500cc riders competed in the first, 125cc and 250cc raced the second moto, and 250cc and 500cc in the third moto. Hannah finished 9th overall in the first moto and 3rd overall in the second) In the second moto, he scored a top ten start and rode to a first place in the 125 class. Along with Jeff Ward in the 500cc class and Ricky Johnson on the 250cc, Hannah and Team USA captured the title in one of the most memorable Motocross Des Nations.

Hannah final race was at the 1989 U.S. Grand Prix. He finished ninth overall having once again battled back in both motos from the rear of the pack. Ready for retirement, Hannah later said “When I rode my last lap at Unadilla I was talking to myself. I said, I have one more lap to go and I never have to ride one of these again.”

In his fifteen-year professional motocross career, Hannah had become the all-time win leader in AMA history, having won 64 Supercross and National races, along with six Trans-AMA events during his career. His 70 AMA win record would stand until Jeremy McGrath broke Hannah's overall win record in 1999.

== Later career ==
After leaving motocross, Hannah took up the sport of airplane racing in the unlimited class flying airplanes such as the P-51 Mustang. When inducted into the AMA Motorcycle Hall of Fame in 1999, Hannah was living near Boise, Idaho, running a sport aviation sales company and winery. In 2000, he was inducted into the Motorsports Hall of Fame of America.

== Career highlights ==
- 1976 500cc Florida Winter-AMA Champion
- 1976 125cc National Champion
- 1977 250cc Florida Winter-AMA Champion
- 1977 250cc Supercross Champion
- 1978 250cc Supercross Champion
- 1978 250cc National Champion
- 1978 500cc Trans-AMA Champion
- 1979 250cc Supercross Champion
- 1979 250cc National Champion
- 1981 250cc Florida Winter-AMA Champion
- 1983 250cc CMC Golden State Champion
- 1986 250cc Florida Winter-AMA Champion
- 1986 250cc U.S. Grand Prix Champion
- 1987 Motocross des Nations "Team USA" World Champions
- 1988 250cc Florida Winter-AMA Champion
