= Trans-AMA motocross series =

The Trans-AMA motocross series were the AMA sanctioned motocross races held from 1970 to 1978. Like the Inter-AM motocross series they featured top American and European riders.

== History ==
The championship was an international series established by the American Motorcyclist Association as a pilot event to help establish motocross in the United States. The series was based on a 500cc engine displacement formula, although the first year of the event featured both 250 and 500cc events. The races run on American tracks to international standards, featuring the top riders from the F.I.M. world championship against the top American riders. In 1970 and 1971, the highest placing American rider at the end of the series was considered the A.M.A. national champion.

By 1978, American riders had improved to the point where it became more of a challenge for European riders to secure an easy victory. Since riders were paid based upon their results rather than starting money paid in European races, fewer European riders were motivated to make the costly trans-atlantic voyage. After 1978 the series was renamed the Trans-USA series, but had fewer European riders participating. The Inter-AMA series was a similar year-end championship, but used a 250cc engine displacement formula.

== Trans-AMA champions ==
Year	Rider	Country	Machine
1970	(United Kingdom) Dave Nicoll	United Kingdom	BSA
1971	(Belgium) Sylvain Geboers	Belgium	Suzuki
1972	(Sweden) Åke Jonsson	Sweden	Maico
1973	(West Germany) Adolf Weil	West Germany	Maico
1974	(Belgium) Roger De Coster	Belgium	Suzuki
1975	(Belgium) Roger De Coster	Belgium	Suzuki
1976	(Belgium) Roger De Coster	Belgium	Suzuki
1977	(Belgium) Roger De Coster	Belgium	Suzuki
1978	(United States) Bob Hannah	United States	Yamaha

== Trans-USA champions ==
Year	Rider	Country	Machine
1979	(United States) Kent Howerton	United States	Suzuki
1980	(United States) Kent Howerton	United States	Suzuki
1981	(United States) Broc Glover	United States	Yamaha
1982	(United States) Dave Hollis	United States	Suzuki

== Inter-AMA champions ==
Year	Rider	Country	Machine	Ref
1969	(Sweden) Arne Kring	Sweden	Husqvarna	
1970	(Sweden) Åke Jonsson	Sweden	Maico	
1971	(Czech Republic) Vlastimil Válek	Czechoslovakia	CZ	
1972	(United States) Gary Jones	United States	Yamaha	
1973	(Finland) Heikki Mikkola	Finland	Husqvarna	
1974	(Czech Republic) Zdeněk Velký	Czechoslovakia	CZ	
1975	(United States) Tony DiStefano	United States	Suzuki	

== See also ==
- List of AMA motocross national champions
- Supercross World Championship
- Motocross World Championship
