= 1982 FIM Motocross World Championship =

Motocross championship season

- Organizer: FIM
- Duration: 28 March/29 August
- Number of races: 36
- Number of manufacturers: 12

Champions
- 500cc: (United States) Brad Lackey
- 250cc: (United States) Danny LaPorte
- 125cc: (Belgium) Eric Geboers

FIM Motocross World Championship
- ← 1981 1983 →

The 1982 FIM Motocross World Championship was the 26th F.I.M. Motocross Racing World Championship season.

== Summary ==
=== 500 class ===
The 1982 500cc World Championship would be a three-way competition between defending champion André Malherbe (Honda) and Suzuki teammates Brad Lackey and André Vromans. 1979 World Champion Graham Noyce (Honda) won the 500cc Swedish Grand Prix but failed to score points consistently and dropped to fourth place in the championship. Håkan Carlqvist (Yamaha) suffered a broken arm in a pre-season accident forcing him to miss the opening rounds of the championship then suffered a wrist injury in Sweden which put him out of contention.

Malherbe won the season opening round in France but then failed to score points in the second round. Lackey took the championship points lead after winning the Austrian Grand Prix, but Malherbe responded with two consecutive victories in Italy and West Germany to close the points gap to just three-points at mid-season. However, Malherbe crashed and broke his leg at the 500cc United States Grand Prix which forced him to miss the rest of the season. After Malherbe's injury, Lackey and Vromans continued to battle for the championship points lead. Vromans had slumped during the Scandinavian rounds, but recovered to score a third-place result in the United States, then won three consecutive Grand Prix races to narrow the points lead to just four-points as the championship moved to the final race of the season in Luxembourg.

At the Luxembourg Grand Prix, Lackey came from behind to pass Vromans just before the end of the race to secure second place behind Hakan Carlqvist in the first heat race. At the start of the second race, Vromans took the lead but he forgot a first-lap detour right off the start and began climbing a hill that was used on every lap but the first. By the time he realized his mistake and turned around, he was in 17th place. Lackey finished the race in 3rd place to secure his first 500cc world championship ahead of second-place Vromans with Neil Hudson (Yamaha) taking third-place in the final points standings.

Entering his 11th season of Grand Prix racing, the 29-year-old Lackey had finished in sixth-place in the 1981 championship and was considered to be past his prime by some motorsports journalists. Despite winning only one Grand Prix race, Lackey scored points in 23 of 24 heat races to defeat Vromans by 11 points. Lackey's victory marked the first time an American competitor had won the 500cc Motocross World Championship.

Future three-time World Champion, 19-year-old David Thorpe (Kawasaki) scored an impressive second place finish behind the reigning World Champion, Malherbe at the season-opening 500cc French Grand Prix, then scored two more second place results that season in the Austrian and British Grand Prix events to finish the season ranked sixth in the championship. Two-time 500cc Class Vice Champion, Gerrit Wolsink retired after the 1982 season.

=== 250 class ===
The 1982 250cc Motocross World Championship was dominated by three competitors with Georges Jobé (Suzuki), Danny LaPorte (Yamaha) and Kees van der Ven (KTM) finishing far ahead of the competition. The 1980 250cc World Champion Jobé began the season by winning two of the first three Grand Prix events but then suffered an elbow fracture at mid-season during the 250cc French Grand Prix. Van der Ven won three Grand Prix races and was briefly leading the provisional standings after the first seven rounds of the season but then faltered at his home Grand Prix in the Netherlands as LaPorte then won three consecutive Grand Prix races. The championship would not be decided until the last race of the season in Sweden where LaPorte finished ahead of Jobé by 13 points. After a career spent racing in the United States, LaPorte became the first American competitor to win the 250cc Motocross World Championship. In a one-time appearance in the World Championship, American Honda rider Donnie Hansen won the 250cc Swedish Grand Prix. Gennady Moiseyev and Jaroslav Falta, the top contenders for the 1974 250cc Motocross World Championship, both retire at the end of the 1982 season.

=== 125 class ===
Marc Velkeneers (Yamaha) took the early lead in the 1982 125cc Motocross World Championship with three consecutive victories, but then Eric Geboers (Suzuki) took the championship points lead at mid-season and never relinquished it. Geboers scored six Grand Prix victories to dominate the season and won the first of his five career World Championships. Gilera teammates Corrado Maddii and Michele Rinaldi battled for second place in the championship with Maddii prevailing by just three points. In a one-time appearance in the World Championship, American Honda rider Johnny O'Mara won the 125cc Swiss Grand Prix.

== Grands Prix ==
=== 500cc ===
Round	Date	Grand Prix	Location	Race 1 Winner	Race 2 Winner	Overall Winner	Report
1	April 25	(France) French Grand Prix	Villars-sous-Écot	(Belgium) André Malherbe	(Belgium) André Malherbe	(Belgium) André Malherbe	Report
2	May 2	(Netherlands) Dutch Grand Prix	Norg	(Belgium) André Vromans	(Belgium) André Vromans	(Belgium) André Vromans	Report
3	May 9	(Sweden) Swedish Grand Prix	Barkarby	(United Kingdom) Graham Noyce	(United Kingdom) Graham Noyce	(United Kingdom) Graham Noyce	Report
4	May 16	(Finland) Finnish Grand Prix	Ruskeasanta	(France) Jean-Jacques Bruno	(United Kingdom) Neil Hudson	(France) Jean-Jacques Bruno	Report
5	May 23	(Austria) Austrian Grand Prix	Sittendorf	(United Kingdom) David Thorpe	(United States) Brad Lackey	(United States) Brad Lackey	Report
6	June 6	(Italy) Italian Grand Prix	Cingoli	(Belgium) André Malherbe	(Belgium) André Malherbe	(Belgium) André Malherbe	Report
7	June 13	(West Germany) West German Grand Prix	Beuren	(Sweden) Håkan Carlqvist	(Belgium) André Malherbe	(Belgium) André Malherbe	Report
8	June 20	United States Grand Prix	Carlsbad	(United States) Danny Chandler	(United States) Mike Bell	(United States) Danny Chandler	Report
9	June 27	(Canada) Canadian Grand Prix	Saint-Gabriel-de-Brandon	(United States) Brad Lackey	(Belgium) André Vromans	(Belgium) André Vromans	Report
10	July 4	(United Kingdom) British Grand Prix	Farleigh Castle	(United Kingdom) David Thorpe	(United States) Brad Lackey	(Belgium) André Vromans	Report
11	August 1	(Belgium) Belgian Grand Prix	Namur	(Belgium) André Vromans	(United Kingdom) Graham Noyce	(Belgium) André Vromans	Report
12	August 8	Luxembourg Grand Prix	Ettelbruck	(Sweden) Håkan Carlqvist	(Sweden) Håkan Carlqvist	(Sweden) Håkan Carlqvist	Report

=== 250cc ===
Round	Date	Grand Prix	Location	Race 1 Winner	Race 2 Winner	Overall Winner	Report
1	April 18	(Switzerland) Swiss Grand Prix	Payerne	(Belgium) Georges Jobé	(Belgium) Georges Jobé	(Belgium) Georges Jobé	Report
2	April 25	(Spain) Spanish Grand Prix	Sabadell	(West Germany) Rolf Dieffenbach	(United States) Mike Guerra	(United States) Mike Guerra	Report
3	May 9	(Belgium) Belgian Grand Prix	Borgloon	(Belgium) Georges Jobé	(United Kingdom) Dave Watson	(Belgium) Georges Jobé	Report
4	May 16	(Czech Republic) Czechoslovak Grand Prix	Holice	(Belgium) Georges Jobé	(United States) Danny LaPorte	(West Germany) Rolf Dieffenbach	Report
5	May 23	(Italy) Italian Grand Prix	Maggiora	(Austria) Heinz Kinigadner	(Netherlands) Kees van der Ven	(Netherlands) Kees van der Ven	Report
6	June 6	(France) French Grand Prix	Corseul	(United States) Danny LaPorte	(Netherlands) Kees van der Ven	(United States) Danny LaPorte	Report
7	June 13	(United Kingdom) British Grand Prix	Hawkstone Park	(Netherlands) Kees van der Ven	(United States) Danny LaPorte	(United States) Danny LaPorte	Report
8	July 4	(Netherlands) Dutch Grand Prix	Mill	(United States) Danny LaPorte	(United States) Danny LaPorte	(United States) Danny LaPorte	Report
9	July 18	(Soviet Union) Russian Grand Prix	Chișinău	(United States) Danny LaPorte	(Belgium) Georges Jobé	(Belgium) Georges Jobé	Report
10	August 1	United States Grand Prix	Unadilla	(United States) David Bailey	(Netherlands) Kees van der Ven	(Netherlands) Kees van der Ven	Report
11	August 22	(Finland) Finnish Grand Prix	Hyvinkää	(United States) Danny LaPorte	(Netherlands) Kees van der Ven	(Netherlands) Kees van der Ven	Report
12	August 29	(Sweden) Swedish Grand Prix	Vimmerby	(United States) Donnie Hansen	(United States) Donnie Hansen	(United States) Donnie Hansen	Report

=== 125cc ===
Round	Date	Grand Prix	Location	Race 1 Winner	Race 2 Winner	Overall Winner	Report
1	March 28	(Netherlands) Dutch Grand Prix	Venray	(Belgium) Marc Velkeneers	(Belgium) Eric Geboers	(Belgium) Marc Velkeneers	Report
2	April 4	(Belgium) Belgian Grand Prix	Angreau	(Belgium) Marc Velkeneers	(Belgium) Marc Velkeneers	(Belgium) Marc Velkeneers	Report
3	April 25	(Austria) Austrian Grand Prix	Launsdorf	(Belgium) Eric Geboers	(Italy) Michele Rinaldi	(Belgium) Marc Velkeneers	Report
4	May 2	(Italy) Italian Grand Prix	Faenza	(Belgium) Eric Geboers	(Belgium) Eric Geboers	(Belgium) Eric Geboers	Report
5	May 9	(Socialist Federal Republic of Yugoslavia) Yugoslavian Grand Prix	Tržič	(Belgium) Harry Everts	(Belgium) Marc Velkeneers	(Belgium) Harry Everts	Report
6	June 6	(Switzerland) Swiss Grand Prix	Frauenfeld	(United States) Johnny O'Mara	(United States) Johnny O'Mara	(United States) Johnny O'Mara	Report
7	June 20	(Czech Republic) Czechoslovak Grand Prix	Dalečín	(Belgium) Eric Geboers	(Belgium) Marc Velkeneers	(Belgium) Eric Geboers	Report
8	July 4	(France) French Grand Prix	Lavaur	(Belgium) Eric Geboers	(Belgium) Eric Geboers	(Belgium) Eric Geboers	Report
9	July 11	(West Germany) West German Grand Prix	Laubuseschbach	(Italy) Michele Rinaldi	(Belgium) Eric Geboers	(Belgium) Eric Geboers	Report
10	July 25	(Finland) Finnish Grand Prix	Kuopio	(Italy) Michele Rinaldi	(Belgium) Eric Geboers	(Italy) Michele Rinaldi	Report
11	August 1	(Sweden) Swedish Grand Prix	Jämshög	(Italy) Corrado Maddii	(Belgium) Eric Geboers	(Belgium) Eric Geboers	Report
12	August 15	(Spain) Spanish Grand Prix	Montgai	(Belgium) Harry Everts	(Belgium) Eric Geboers	(Belgium) Eric Geboers	Report

== Final standings ==
Points are awarded based on the results of each individual heat race. The top 10 classified finishers in each heat race score points according to the following scale;

Position	1st	2nd	3rd	4th	5th	6th	7th	8th	9th	10th
Points	15	12	10	8	6	5	4	3	2	1

=== 500cc ===
(Results in italics indicate overall winner)

Pos	Rider	Machine	FRA (France)		NED (Netherlands)		SWE (Sweden)		FIN (Finland)		AUT (Austria)		ITA (Italy)		GER (West Germany)		USA (United States)		CAN (Canada)		UK (United Kingdom)		BEL (Belgium)		LUX (Luxembourg)		Points
1	(United States) Brad Lackey	Suzuki	2	6	7	2	3	3	8	6	3	1	5	2	3	2	3	3	1		3	1	2	4	2	3	228
2	(Belgium) André Vromans	Suzuki	3	8	1	1	4	10			7	2	2	4	5	3	4	2	2	1	2	2	1	2	3	6	217
3	(United Kingdom) Neil Hudson	Yamaha	4	4		7	2	4	5	1	5	6	6	3	4	4	7	7	4	4	6	4	4	8	4		159
4	(United Kingdom) Graham Noyce	Honda		3	8	6	1	1		3	2	5	9		6	6	8		5	2	4	5	3	1			148
5	(Belgium) André Malherbe	Honda	1	1			5	2	4			4	1	1	2	1											121
6	(United Kingdom) David Thorpe	Kawasaki	6	2			6	7	6	7	1	3		5	7	5					1	3	5	3			117
7	(United States) Gary Semics	Honda			6	9	9	5	9	5	10	7	4	7	10	7			3	3	9	6	6		7	5	87
8	(Sweden) Håkan Carlqvist	Yamaha							2	8	4		3		1								8		1	1	81
9	(France) Jean-Jacques Bruno	Suzuki		7	2			9	1	2	8	8															51
10	(Finland) Jukka Sintonen	Yamaha	8		5		8		3	4				6									9	5	9		45
11	(Belgium) Jaak van Velthoven	KTM		5	4	4		8			6	10				9		9			5	8					44
12	(Italy) Franco Picco	Yamaha	5	10									7	8	8	10						9		6	5	2	43
13	(France) Patrick Fura	Husqvarna						6				9	8		9	8			7	5	7						29
14	(Luxembourg) Eddy Sterckx	Maico			3	3																			8		23
15	(United States) Danny Chandler	Honda															1	5									21
16	(United States) Mike Bell	Yamaha															6	1									20
17	(Sweden) Inge Edberg	Husqvarna					10							10					8	6				7		9	16
18	(United States) Alan King	Suzuki															5	4									14
18	(Republic of Ireland) Laurence Spence	Maico																				10			6	4	14
20	(United States) Darrel Schultz	Honda															2										12
21	(Netherlands) Gerrit Wolsink	Honda					7		10												10	7					10
22	(Netherlands) Gérard Rond	KTM			9																		7			10	7
23	(Netherlands) Toon Karsmakers	Honda				5																					6
23	(United States) Chuck Sun	Honda															10	6									6
23	(Belgium) Ivan Van Den Broek	Maico	10	9																	8						6
26	(Canada) Ross Pedereson	Suzuki																	6								5
26	(United States) Goat Breker	Kawasaki															9	8									5
28	(United Kingdom) Billy Aldbridge	Suzuki	7																								4
28	(Sweden) Arne Lindfors	Yamaha							7																		4
28	(Canada) Terry Hofoss	Yamaha																		7							4
28	(West Germany) Michael Heutz	Yamaha																								7	4
28	(West Germany) Werner Siegle	Maico																						10		8	4
28	(Netherlands) Jaak Verwaayen	Honda			10														10	9							4
34	(Sweden) Bertil Ovgard	Yamaha				8																					3
34	(Canada) Tim Krogh	Honda																		8							3
34	(Italy) Pietro Miccheli	KTM											10	9													3
34	(Netherlands) Hank Seppenwoolde	Honda								9															10		3
38	(Norway) Jan Kristoffersen	Yamaha	9																								2
38	(West Germany) Ludwig Reinbold	KTM									9																2
38	(Canada) Pierre Couture	Honda																	9								2
38	(Finland) Tom Flink	Husqvarna																						9			2
42	(Netherlands) Gieljo Van Zoggel	Suzuki				10																					1
42	(Sweden) Leif Persson	Husqvarna								10																	1
42	(United States) Billy Grossi	Husqvarna																10									1
42	(Canada) Zoli Berenyl	Honda																		10							1
42	(Finland) Tapani Pikkarainen	Honda																					10				1

=== 250cc ===
(Results in italics indicate overall winner)

Pos	Rider	Machine	CH (Switzerland)		ESP (Spain)		BEL (Belgium)		CZE (Czech Republic)		ITA (Italy)		FRA (France)		UK (United Kingdom)		NED (Netherlands)		USR (Soviet Union)		USA (United States)		FIN (Finland)		SWE (Sweden)		Points
1	(United States) Danny LaPorte	Yamaha		2	9	10	2		7	1	5	2	1	3	2	1	1	1	1	2	4	2	1	3	4	2	238
2	(Belgium) Georges Jobé	Suzuki	1	1	5	2	1	2	1		3	4			4		2	2	2	1	5	5	2	2	2	3	225
3	(Netherlands) Kees van der Ven	KTM	5	7	8	3	3	5	6		2	1	6	1	1	2	5	3	5	6	3	1	3	1	3		205
4	(United Kingdom) Dave Watson	Yamaha		3	7	6	7	1	4		4	5	4		3	4	4		4	3			8				115
5	(West Germany) Rolf Dieffenbach	Honda			1		6	3	2	2	7			2					6	4	9			6			90
6	(Belgium) Jean-Claude Laquaye	Honda	8	8		7	5	8	3	4	8	8					10	8	7	5		7	10	4	6	7	79
7	(United States) Mike Guerra	Husqvarna		4	4	1			5			10	8	4	5	5	7	5	10			10		8			76
8	(Netherlands) Henk Van Mierlo	Suzuki							10				9	6	6	3	3	4					4	5	7		59
9	(Austria) Heinz Kinigadner	Yamaha	7			4	4		9		1	3							3								57
10	(Finland) Matti Tarkkonen	Yamaha	3	6	2		10	7		5														7			42
11	(United States) Donnie Hansen	Honda																				4			1	1	38
12	(Finland) Erkki Sundstrom	Suzuki						10		3				9		7			8	9					5	6	33
13	(Luxembourg) Jo Martens	Yamaha	6	5													6					8	6			4	32
14	(Netherlands) Benny Wilken	Maico					8	4	8	7													7		9	8	27
15	(West Germany) Hans Maisch	Maico	4		6								2														25
15	(Belgium) Gaston Rahier	Suzuki									6	9	5	5					9	7							25
17	(Belgium) André Massant	Suzuki						6		6				7	9	8		7									23
18	(United States) Ricky Johnson	Yamaha																			2	3					22
19	(United States) David Bailey	Honda																			1	6					20
20	(Italy) Morizio Dolce	Maico	2																							10	13
20	(Sweden) Sven Berggren	Husqvarna						9							8			6							10	9	13
22	(Sweden) Torleif Hansen	Yamaha																					5			5	12
23	(Czech Republic) Jaroslav Falta	ČZ	10		3																						11
24	(France) Daniel Péan	Kawasaki											3														10
25	(Finland) Paul Decendre	Suzuki	9	9												6											9
25	(Belgium) Robert Greisch	Honda		10						10	9	6															9
27	(West Germany) Vilem Toman	Suzuki			10	5																					7
27	(West Germany) Arno Drechsel	Honda													7					8							7
29	(Sweden) Magnus Nyberg	Suzuki				8								10		9											6
29	(Netherlands) Peter Van De Nieuvenhoff	Suzuki															8	10						9			6
31	(United States) Broc Glover	Yamaha																			6						5
31	(Denmark) Søren Mortensen	KTM				9																	9	10			5
31	(Belgium) Erwin Albert	Yamaha											10				9	9									5
34	(Austria) Willy Wallinger	Puch											7														4
34	(United States) Scott Burnworth	Yamaha																			7						4
34	(Soviet Union) Vladimir Kavinov	Yamaha										7															4
34	(Soviet Union) Gennady Moiseyev	KTM								8										10							4
38	(United Kingdom) Willie Simpson	Maico												8													3
38	(United States) Steve Martin	Honda																			8						3
38	(Sweden) Peter Johanssen	Yamaha																							8		3
41	(Belgium) Jean-Marie Milissen	Husqvarna					9																				2
41	(Switzerland) Louis Ristori	Honda								9																	2
41	(United States) Dave Hollis	Suzuki																				9					2
44	(Italy) Ivan Alborghetti	Gilera									10																1
44	(United Kingdom) Jeremy Whatley	Suzuki													10												1
44	(Belgium) Jacky Martens	KTM														10											1
44	(United States) Marc Murphy	Yamaha																			10						1

=== 125cc ===
(Results in italics indicate overall winner)

Pos	Rider	Machine	NED (Netherlands)		BEL (Belgium)		AUT (Austria)		ITA (Italy)		YUG (Socialist Federal Republic of Yugoslavia)		CH (Switzerland)		CZE (Czech Republic)		FRA (France)		GER (West Germany)		FIN (Finland)		SWE (Sweden)		ESP (Spain)		Points
1	(Belgium) Eric Geboers	Suzuki	4	1	9	8	1		1	1		3	2	2	1	2	1	1	2	1	5	1	2	1	2	1	266
2	(Italy) Corrado Maddii	Gilera		4	5	3	4	5	3	3	3	4	3	3	4	3	5	2	3	2	2	3	1	3	3		211
3	(Italy) Michele Rinaldi	Gilera	3	3	3			1	2	2	2	9	5	4	2	4	4	4	1	6	1	2	3	2	5		208
4	(Belgium) Harry Everts	Suzuki	2		2	5	9	4		5	1	2	4	8	6		3	3		3		5	4		1	2	160
5	(Belgium) Marc Velkeneers	Yamaha	1	2	1	1	2	3	7		5	1	7	7	5	1					3	6		4			156
6	(France) Jacky Vimond	Yamaha			8	6			10	7	9	8	6	6	8	5	2	6	6	5	4	7		8	4	4	96
7	(Japan) Akira Watanabe	Suzuki		9	4	7	3	2	4	6	10	5	10			6	6	5	5	4							87
8	(Soviet Union) Yuri Khudiakov	Cagiva				4	5	6	8					9					4			4	8	7	8	3	60
9	(Japan) Yoshifumo Sugio	Honda	10		7	2				8	4	6	9		3	7			7	7							57
10	(Belgium) Alain Lejeune	Honda					7	7	5		6	7							8		6			6	6	5	47
11	(Italy) Giuseppe Andreani	KTM					6		6	4		10	8	5	7	10		7			10				10	6	44
12	(United States) Johnny O'Mara	Honda											1	1													30
13	(Netherlands) Gert Van Doorn	Suzuki	6											10			8	9		8	7	10		5			25
14	(Netherlands) John Hensen	Suzuki	9	5							7				10	8	10	10	9							9	22
15	(Finland) Pekka Vehkonen	Yamaha	7	6			10											8								7	17
16	(Italy) Michele Magarotto	TGM			10			9									7			9					7		13
17	(Luxembourg) Johan Martens	Honda	5	7		10																					11
18	(Sweden) Jeff Nilsson	Kawasaki																					5		9		8
19	(Sweden) Lars Berqvist	Suzuki																				8	7				7
20	(Italy) Mauro Miele	KTM						8	9	10																	6
21	(Belgium) Dirk Verhaegen	Suzuki			6																						5
21	(Finland) Kurt Lundqvist	Suzuki																					6				5
21	(West Germany) Roland Diepold	Suzuki								9						9										10	5
24	(Netherlands) Albert Ensing	Suzuki	8	10																							4
24	(Austria) Karl Sulzer	KTM					8	10																			4
24	(Finland) Jan Postema	Yamaha		8																			10				4
24	(Finland) Ari Viiri	Suzuki				9									9												4
24	(Italy) Alberto Barozzi	TGM																	10	10	9						4
29	(Austria) Helmut Frauwellner	Suzuki									8																3
29	(Finland) Seppo Isomaki	Suzuki																			8						3
29	(Spain) Antonio Elias	Derbi																								8	3
29	(Finland) Arto Pantilla	Kawasaki																				9		10			3
33	(France) Yannig Kervella	KTM															9										2
33	(Sweden) Peter Trang	Yamaha																					9				2
33	(West Germany) Klaus Kreutz	Honda																						9			2
