= 1980 FIM Motocross World Championship =

Motocross championship season

- Organizer: FIM
- Duration: 13 April/24 August
- Number of races: 35
- Number of manufacturers: 18

Champions
- 500cc: (Belgium) André Malherbe
- 250cc: (Belgium) Georges Jobé
- 125cc: (Belgium) Harry Everts

FIM Motocross World Championship
- ← 1979 1981 →

The 1980 FIM Motocross World Championship was the 24th F.I.M. Motocross Racing World Championship season.

== Summary ==
=== 500 class ===
André Malherbe (Honda) won the first 500cc World Championship of his career after a season-long battle with Brad Lackey (Kawasaki) that was not decided until the final race of the year. As well as battling with Lackey, Malherbe also faced a strong field of competitors in the 1980 season including the defending champion Graham Noyce (Honda), five-time World Champion Roger De Coster (Honda), and the 1979 250cc World Champion Håkan Carlqvist (Yamaha) as well as talented newcomer André Vromans (Yamaha).

The season was dominated by Malherbe and Lackey as the two racers traded the top two positions in the points standing five times during a season-long battle for the 500cc World Championship. Defending champion Noyce won the Finnish Grand Prix but then suffered a broken leg and missed the remainder of the season recovering from his injury. Carlqvist remained in contention after winning his home Grand Prix in Sweden but then faded during the second half of the season. Entering the final race of the year in Luxembourg, Malherbe held a slim one-point lead over Lackey in the championship points standings. Lackey suffered two crashes in Luxembourg which allowed Malherbe to win the world championship with Lackey finishing in second place. Malherbe claimed the world title by winning 9 individual heat races and 4 Grand Prix overall victories. Vromans won two Grand Prix races and challenged his Yamaha teammate for third place before Carlqvist outscored him in the final two races.

Privateer racer Marty Moates (Yamaha) scored an upset victory at the 500cc United States Grand Prix held at the Carlsbad Raceway. His unexpected victory against a field of top-rated competitors came at a time when European racers dominated the sport and marked the first time that an American had won his home Grand Prix since the event's inception in 1973. Five-time World Champion Roger De Coster announced his retirement after scoring an impressive victory at the season-ending 500cc Luxembourg Grand Prix. The retirements of Heikki Mikkola and De Coster who had dominated the 1970s, marked the beginning of a new era in the Motocross World Championships.

=== 250 class ===
The 1980 250cc World Championship lacked any one clearly dominant competitor as eleven different riders won heat races during the season. Despite only winning only three Grand Prix victories, Georges Jobé (Suzuki) won the championship through sheer consistency as he was able to score points at a rate that none of his competitors were able to match. Runnerup Kees van der Ven (Maico) also had three Grand Prix victories but failed to score any points in 10 races. At 19 years, 6 months and 14 days, Jobé dethroned Joël Robert for the honorary title of youngest Motocross World Champion in history at the time.

=== 125 class ===
After dominating the 1979 season, Harry Everts faced stronger opposition in the 1980 125cc Motocross World Championship from a trio of young riders. Marc Velkeneers (Yamaha) won two of the first three rounds to take the championship points lead. Everts then suffered a broken wrist in France forcing him to miss three rounds while points leader Velkeneers suffered a broken leg in West Germany. Their absence allowed Michèle Rinaldi (TGM) and Eric Geboers (Suzuki) to narrow the points gap before Everts was able to return and win the Finnish and Spanish Grand Prix events to clinch the title at the last race of the season by 5 points over Rinaldi. Everts' Suzuki teammate Akira Watanabe was expected to be one of his strongest rival for the title but he suffered an injury in the opening round and never returned. The dominant Suzuki factory racing team narrowly avoided defeat by the tiny Italian manufacturer TGM with Rinaldi finishing in second place just 5 points behind Everts.

== Grands Prix ==
=== 500cc ===
Round	Date	Grand Prix	Location	Race 1 Winner	Race 2 Winner	Overall Winner	Report
1	April 13	(Switzerland) Swiss Grand Prix	Payerne	(Belgium) André Malherbe	(Belgium) André Malherbe	(Belgium) André Malherbe	Report
2	April 20	(Austria) Austrian Grand Prix	Sittendorf	(United States) Brad Lackey	(United States) Brad Lackey	(United States) Brad Lackey	Report
3	May 4	(France) French Grand Prix	Gaillefontaine	(Belgium) André Malherbe	(Belgium) André Malherbe	(Belgium) André Malherbe	Report
4	May 11	(Sweden) Swedish Grand Prix	Vissefjarda	(United States) Brad Lackey	(Sweden) Håkan Carlqvist	(Sweden) Håkan Carlqvist	Report
5	May 18	(Finland) Finnish Grand Prix	Ruskeasanta	(United Kingdom) Graham Noyce	(Belgium) André Malherbe	(United Kingdom) Graham Noyce	Report
6	June 8	(Italy) Italian Grand Prix	Fermo	(Belgium) Roger De Coster	(Belgium) André Malherbe	(Belgium) André Malherbe	Report
7	June 15	(Netherlands) Dutch Grand Prix	Valkenswaard	(Belgium) André Vromans	(Belgium) André Vromans	(Belgium) André Vromans	Report
8	June 22	United States Grand Prix	Carlsbad	(United States) Marty Moates	(United States) Marty Moates	(United States) Marty Moates	Report
9	July 13	(Canada) Canadian Grand Prix	Saint-Gabriel	(United States) Brad Lackey	(Belgium) André Malherbe	(Sweden) Håkan Carlqvist	Report
10	July 20	(West Germany) West German Grand Prix	Gaildorf	(Belgium) André Vromans	(Sweden) Håkan Carlqvist	(Belgium) André Vromans	Report
11	August 5	(Belgium) Belgian Grand Prix	Namur	(Belgium) André Malherbe	(Belgium) André Malherbe	(Belgium) André Malherbe	Report
12	August 12	Luxembourg Grand Prix	Ettelbruck	(Belgium) Roger De Coster	(Belgium) Roger De Coster	(Belgium) Roger De Coster	Report

=== 250cc ===
Round	Date	Grand Prix	Location	Race 1 Winner	Race 2 Winner	Overall Winner	Report
1	April 13	(Spain) Spanish Grand Prix	Sabadell	(West Germany) Rolf Dieffenbach	(Czech Republic) Jaroslav Falta	(West Germany) Rolf Dieffenbach	Report
2	May 11	(Czech Republic) Czechoslovak Grand Prix	Holice	(Czech Republic) Jaroslav Falta	(Bulgaria) Dimitar Rangelov	(Belgium) Raymond Boven	Report
3	May 18	(West Germany) West German Grand Prix	Beuren	(United Kingdom) Neil Hudson	(Belgium) Raymond Boven	(West Germany) Fritz Kobele	Report
4	June 1	(Belgium) Belgian Grand Prix	Marche-en-Famenne	(Belgium) Georges Jobé	(Belgium) Georges Jobé	(Belgium) Georges Jobé	Report
5	June 8	(Poland) Polish Grand Prix	Szczecin	(Netherlands) Kees van der Ven	(West Germany) Rolf Dieffenbach	(Netherlands) Kees van der Ven	Report
6	June 15	(Soviet Union) Russian Grand Prix	Chișinău	(Bulgaria) Dimitar Rangelov	(Soviet Union) Vladimir Kavinov	(Soviet Union) Vladimir Kavinov	Report
7	June 22	(United Kingdom) British Grand Prix	Hawkstone Park	(Netherlands) Kees van der Ven	(Belgium) Georges Jobé	(Belgium) Georges Jobé	Report
8	June 29	(France) French Grand Prix	Brou	(France) Jean-Claude Laquaye	(Bulgaria) Dimitar Rangelov	(Belgium) Georges Jobé	Report
9	July 13	(Netherlands) Dutch Grand Prix	Hengelo	(Netherlands) Kees van der Ven	(Netherlands) Kees van der Ven	(Netherlands) Kees van der Ven	Report
10	July 20	United States Grand Prix	Unadilla	(United States) Kent Howerton	(United States) Kent Howerton	(United States) Kent Howerton	Report
11	August 17	(Finland) Finnish Grand Prix	Hyvinkää	(Netherlands) Kees van der Ven	(France) Jean-Claude Laquaye	(Netherlands) Kees van der Ven	Report
12	August 24	(Sweden) Swedish Grand Prix	Bra	(Belgium) Jean-Paul Mingels	(West Germany) Rolf Dieffenbach	(Belgium) Jean-Paul Mingels	Report

=== 125cc ===
Round	Date	Grand Prix	Location	Race 1 Winner	Race 2 Winner	Overall Winner	Report
1	March 30	(Netherlands) Dutch Grand Prix	Norg	(Belgium) Harry Everts	(Belgium) Marc Velkeneers	(Belgium) Harry Everts	Report
2	April 13	(Austria) Austrian Grand Prix	Launsdorf	(Belgium) Harry Everts	(Belgium) Marc Velkeneers	(Belgium) Harry Everts	Report
3	April 20	(Belgium) Belgian Grand Prix	Hechtel	(Belgium) Harry Everts	(Belgium) Marc Velkeneers	(Belgium) Marc Velkeneers	Report
4	April 27	(France) French Grand Prix	Verdun	(Belgium) Marc Velkeneers	(Belgium) Eric Geboers	(Belgium) Eric Geboers	Report
5	May 18	(Socialist Federal Republic of Yugoslavia) Yugoslavian Grand Prix	Tržič	(Italy) Michele Rinaldi	(Belgium) Gaston Rahier	(Belgium) Gaston Rahier	Report
6	June 8	(West Germany) West German Grand Prix	Sankt Wendel	(Belgium) Eric Geboers	(Japan) Tetsumi Mitsuyasu	(Belgium) Eric Geboers	Report
7	June 15	(Italy) Italian Grand Prix	Montevarchi	(Italy) Michele Rinaldi	(Italy) Michele Rinaldi	(Italy) Michele Rinaldi	Report
8	June 22	(Czech Republic) Czechoslovak Grand Prix	Dalečín	(Japan) Tetsumi Mitsuyasu	(Belgium) Eric Geboers	(Belgium) Eric Geboers	Report
9	July 6	(Finland) Finnish Grand Prix	Salo	(Finland) Matti Autio	(Belgium) Harry Everts	(Belgium) Harry Everts	Report
10	July 27	United States Grand Prix	Lexington	(United States) Johnny O'Mara	(United States) Ron Sun	(United States) Johnny O'Mara	Report
11	August 17	(Spain) Spanish Grand Prix	Montgai	(Belgium) Harry Everts	(Belgium) Harry Everts	(Belgium) Harry Everts	Report

== Final standings ==
Points are awarded based on the results of each individual heat race. The top 10 classified finishers in each heat race score points according to the following scale;

Position	1st	2nd	3rd	4th	5th	6th	7th	8th	9th	10th
Points	15	12	10	8	6	5	4	3	2	1

=== 500cc ===
(Results in italics indicate overall winner)

Pos	Rider	Machine	CH (Switzerland)		AUT (Austria)		FRA (France)		SWE (Sweden)		FIN (Finland)		ITA (Italy)		NED (Netherlands)		USA (United States)		CAN (Canada)		GER (West Germany)		BEL (Belgium)		LUX (Luxembourg)		Points
1	(Belgium) André Malherbe	Honda	1	1	8	5	1	1	3	2	4	1	2	1	2	7			3	1		8	1	1	3	3	235
2	(United States) Brad Lackey	Kawasaki	2	2	1	1	5	2	1	3	3	3	5	6		2	6		1	4	2	2	3	2	5	10	221
3	(Sweden) Håkan Carlqvist	Yamaha	3	3	2	2	4		2	1			10	8	4		2		2	2	4	1	4	3	4	2	188
4	(Belgium) André Vromans	Yamaha	4	5	3	10		7	4	5	6	5	3	2	1	1	4	6		3	1	3			2		166
5	(Belgium) Roger De Coster	Honda	5		6	4		5			2		1	3					4	9	3	4	2	8	1	1	135
6	(Netherlands) Gérard Rond	Suzuki	6	4			7			4	7	2	6	4	3	3		2	5	5			8	4	8		112
7	(France) Jean-Jacques Bruno	Suzuki			5	6	2	3			5	6	9	5		4					5				9		68
8	(United Kingdom) Graham Noyce	Honda					3	4	5		1	4	4														55
9	(Belgium) Yvan van den Broeck	Maico		7	4	8	8					9			7	10			7	10		5			6	4	49
10	(Belgium) Jaak van Velthoven	KTM		6							8	8		7	8	5		9	6	8	10		9	5			43
11	(Finland) Tapani Pikkarainen	KTM	8	10			10	9		6		10			6	6			8	6			6				36
12	(West Germany) Herbert Schmitz	Maico	7	8						8			8									7	5		7	6	32
13	(United States) Marty Moates	Yamaha															1	1									30
14	(Netherlands) Gerrit Wolsink	Maico	9		10	3			7						5				10								24
15	(United States) Danny LaPorte	Suzuki															3	3									20
16	(Sweden) Arne Lindfors	Yamaha					6	6			10										9			7			17
16	(Sweden) Conny Carlsson	Husqvarna					9	8	8		9										8		7				17
18	(Republic of Ireland) Laurence Spence	Yamaha												9				10	9	7		6				9	16
19	(West Germany) Ludwig Reinbold	KTM				9															6				10	5	14
19	(United Kingdom) Geoff Mayes	Maico			7				6															9		8	14
20	(Netherlands) Peter Herlings	Maico							9	9		7			10	8											12
22	(United States) Chuck Sun	Honda															7	5									10
23	(United States) Marty Smith	Suzuki																4									8
24	(Sweden) Bertil Ovgard	Husqvarna	10						10						9	9							10				7
25	(United States) Goat Breker	Kawasaki															5										6
25	(West Germany) Walter Gruhler	Suzuki				7																10		10			6
27	(Belgium) André Massant	Maico																						6			5
27	(Italy) Morizio Dolce	Maico											7	10													5
27	(United States) Jim Gibson	Honda															10	7									5
30	(Sweden) Uno Palm	Suzuki								7																	4
30	(Denmark) Arne Lodal	Husqvarna																			7						4
30	(Belgium) Raymond Heeren	Yamaha																								7	4
33	(United States) Rex Staten	Yamaha															8										3
33	(United States) Gary Semics	Yamaha																8									3
35	(Switzerland) Fritz Graf	Yamaha		9																							2
35	(Switzerland) Herbert Salzmann	Husqvarna			9																						2
35	(United States) Gaylon Mosier	Kawasaki															9										2
35	(Austria) Georg Reiter	KTM																				9					2
39	(United States) Jim Pomeroy	Beta						10																			1
39	(Sweden) Pelle Grandqvist	Husqvarna								10																	1

=== 250cc ===
(Results in italics indicate overall winner)

Pos	Rider	Machine	ESP (Spain)		CZE (Czech Republic)		GER (West Germany)		BEL (Belgium)		POL (Poland)		USR (Soviet Union)		UK (United Kingdom)		FRA (France)		NED (Netherlands)		USA (United States)		FIN (Finland)		SWE (Sweden)		Points
1	(Belgium) Georges Jobé	Suzuki	4	4	4	3		2	1	1	4	3	4	2	2	1	3	3	3	4	2	2		8	2		218
2	(Netherlands) Kees van der Ven	Maico			8			8	10		1	4			1			2	1	1	5	4	1	2	7		132
3	(Bulgaria) Dimitar Rangelov	Husqvarna		8	6	1	5	4		3	3	5	1	3	8	5		1								7	116
4	(West Germany) Rolf Dieffenbach	Honda	1	3		8	8					1	5	10		4	10	5				8			3	1	96
5	(Belgium) Raymond Boven	Husqvarna			2	2		1	4	4	8	7		6				6	7	6	7		3				95
6	(Belgium) Jean-Claude Laquaye	SWM		7		9	3	6			5	2	7		5		1			8		5		1			88
7	(Czech Republic) Jaroslav Falta	ČZ		1	1	4	6	7		2	10		8	5									10	3			80
8	(Finland) Erkki Sundstrom	Husqvarna	6		7					8	7		6	8		2	9		4	2		9	9	4			70
9	(Belgium) Jean-Paul Mingels	Yamaha				7	4		7	9	2							9		5					1	3	63
10	(Finland) Matti Tarkkonen	Yamaha		10		10				7	6	6			9		8	8	5	10		10	2	7	6	9	55
11	(Denmark) Fritz Kobele	Honda	2	2			2	3					10	7													51
12	(Soviet Union) Vladimir Kavinov	ČZ	5	5	5								2	1													45
12	(Netherlands) Benny Wilken	KTM													3	6			2				6	5	9	6	45
14	(Denmark) Jan Kristofferson	Yamaha		6					5	5						8		4	10	7					8	5	42
15	(France) Patrick Fura	Husqvarna	3	9					3			10	3	4													41
16	(Soviet Union) Gennady Moiseyev	ČZ				6			2			9				3	4										37
16	(Sweden) Magnus Nyberg	KTM								6					6	10		10						6	4	2	37
18	(United Kingdom) Neil Hudson	Maico			3	5	1														9						33
19	(Denmark) Søren Mortensen	Kramer-Rotax	8		10			5			9				4					9				10	10	4	32
20	(United States) Kent Howerton	Suzuki																			1	1					30
21	(United States) Darrell Schultz	Suzuki																			3	3					20
22	(Netherlands) Henk Van Mierlo	Suzuki																	6	3							15
23	(France) Patrick Boniface	KTM							9								2										14
23	(Sweden) Rolf Wisksell	Husqvarna															7						4	9			14
25	(Sweden) Leif Nicklasson	Husqvarna								10					7				9		8					8	13
26	(United States) Mike Guerra	Husqvarna																			4	7					12
26	(Sweden) Sven Berggren	Husqvarna																					5		5		12
28	(Belgium) Johny Wasilewski	Honda															5		8								9
28	(West Germany) Hans Maisch	Maico	7												10	7											9
28	(Czech Republic) Jiří Churavý	ČZ					7	10					9	9													9
31	(Finland) Jukka Sintonen	Suzuki										8											7				7
31	(Italy) Michele Magarotto	Montesa	10				9											7									7
33	(United Kingdom) Billy Aldbridge	Suzuki							6																		5
33	(United Kingdom) Dave Watson	Suzuki															6										5
33	(United States) JoJo Keller	Honda																			6						5
33	(United States) David Bailey	Kawasaki																				6					5
33	(Austria) Heinz Kinigadner	KTM						9	8																		5
38	(Finland) Taimi Simo	Husqvarna																					8				3
39	(Spain) Tony Arcarons	Montesa	9																								2
39	(Czech Republic) Stanislas Jacenek	ČZ			9																						2
39	(United Kingdom) Rob Hooper	Maico														9											2
42	(Austria) Willy Wallinger	KTM					10																				1
42	(United States) Jimmy Ellis	Yamaha																			10						1
42	(Sweden) Ove Karlsson	Suzuki																								10	1

=== 125cc ===
(Results in italics indicate overall winner)

Pos	Rider	Machine	NED (Netherlands)		AUT (Austria)		BEL (Belgium)		FRA (France)		YUG (Socialist Federal Republic of Yugoslavia)		GER (West Germany)		ITA (Italy)		CZE (Czech Republic)		FIN (Finland)		USA (United States)		ESP (Spain)		Points
1	(Belgium) Harry Everts	Suzuki	1	2	1		1	3	2	7							8		2	1	7		1	1	147
2	(Italy) Michele Rinaldi	TGM	5	7				6		3	1	5	5	3	1	1	3	6	4	6	6		2	6	142
3	(Belgium) Eric Geboers	Suzuki					4	5	4	1			1	2	2		2	1	5	2			4		129
4	(Belgium) Marc Velkeneers	Yamaha		1	2	1	2	1	1		5	3							8	3					113
4	(Japan) Tetsumi Mitsuyasu	Yamaha			4					9	3	6	2	1	3		1	2		5		5		2	113
6	(Japan) Torao Suzuki	Aprilia	7	8	5	3				5			3		4	2	10	3	3				3	8	93
7	(Finland) Matti Autio	Honda	3				5	9	7		4	4	9			5	5		1				5	7	77
8	(Italy) Dario Nani	Gilera			7				5	2	6		6		5	4	4	4			5	8	6		55
9	(Belgium) Gaston Rahier	Gilera	4	6		2	7		10		2	1									9			4	67
9	(Netherlands) Peter Groeneveld	Honda		3			3	2				7		5		6		5	7	4			10	10	67
11	(France) Jacky Vimond	Yamaha			6				6				7	4	9			10	9	8					30
12	(Italy) Mauro Miele	Cagiva			10	4					9				6	3									26
13	(Soviet Union) Yuri Khudiakov	ČZ		10					3		10	10	10				6	9		10			7		26
13	(Italy) Corrado Maddii	Aprilia				9	6							8				8					8	3	26
15	(United States) Johnny O'Mara	Honda																			1	3			25
15	(Netherlands) Dinant Zijlstra	Yamaha	2	5										9				7	10						25
17	(Belgium) Jean-Marie Milissen	TGM	6	9			10	4		4															24
18	(Switzerland) Walter Kalberer	KTM		4								2													20
19	(Italy) Franco Perfini	Gilera				7			8				4		7										19
20	(United States) Ron Sun	Honda																				1			15
20	(New Zealand) Craig Coleman	Suzuki			3								8											9	15
22	(Finland) Pauli Piipola	Gilera						10		8						9				9				5	14
23	(Sweden) Ove Svendson	KTM			9						7			6			9								13
24	(United States) Mark Barnett	Suzuki																			2				12
24	(United States) Richard Coon	Honda																				2			12
26	(United States) Tom Benolkin	Honda																			3				10
27	(Spain) Antonio Elias	Derbi	10			5			9																9
27	(Finland) Seppo Isomaki	Suzuki																	6	7					9
27	(Soviet Union) Valery Korneev	ČZ				6		7																	9
27	(Italy) Renato Zocchi	Cagiva													8	7							9		9
31	(United States) Dick Bentley	Suzuki																			4				8
31	(United States) Broc Glover	Yamaha																				4			8
31	(West Germany) Paul Rottler	KTM								6	8														8
31	(United States) Pat Moroney	Yamaha																			8	6			8
31	(Belgium) Robert Greisch	Puch					8									10	7								8
36	(Netherlands) Hank Seppenwoolde	Honda	8											7											7
37	(United States) Dave Taylor	Cagiva																				7			4
37	(Italy) Ivan Alborghetti	KTM													10	8									4
37	(Netherlands) Erik Van Essen	KTM	9				9																		4
40	(Austria) Georg Reiter	KTM			8																				3
40	(West Germany) Emil Schwarz	Honda				8																			3
40	(Netherlands) Gilbert De Roover	Aprilia						8																	3
40	(Switzerland) Tony Kalberer	KTM										8													3
40	(Austria) Helmut Frauwellner	KTM				10						9													3
45	(United States) Pat Mihalik	Honda																				9			2
46	(Finland) Gote Liljegren	Suzuki								10															1
46	(Soviet Union) Andreiv Ledovsky	ČZ												10											1
46	(United States) Jon Surwall	Yamaha																			10				1
46	(United States) Pedro Perales	Suzuki																				10			1
