= Heinz Kinigadner =

Austrian motorcycle racer

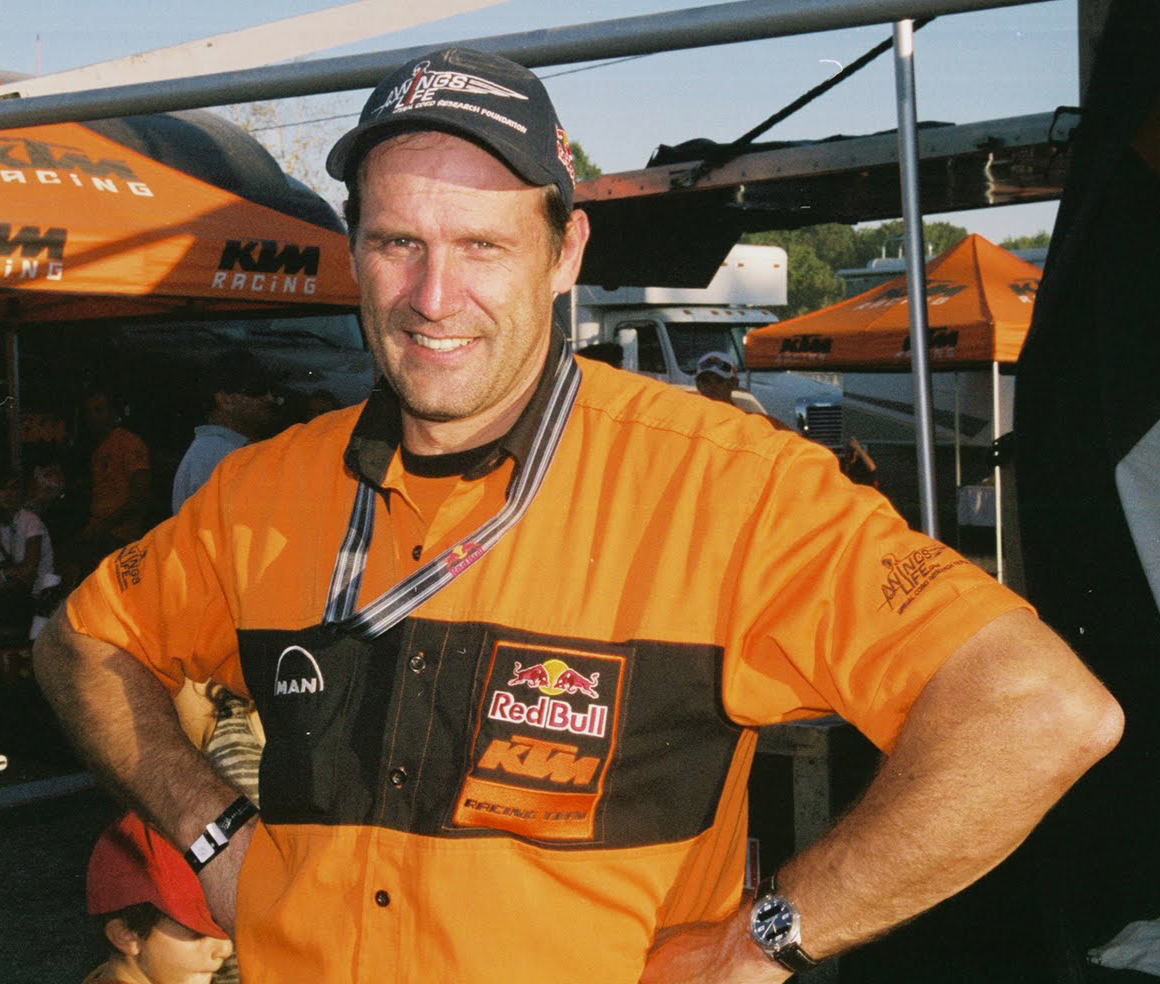
- Kinigadner in 2009
- Nationality: Austrian
- Born: 28 January 1960 (age 66) Uderns, Tyrol, Austria

Motocross career
- Years active: 1980–1988
- Teams: KTM
- Championships: 250cc (1984, 1985)
- Wins: 7

Heinz Kinigadner (born 28 January 1960) is an Austrian former professional motocross racer and current sports manager and motorsport consultant for KTM Motorsports. He competed in the Motocross World Championships from 1980 to 1988, most prominently as a member of the KTM factory racing team where he became the first Austrian competitor to win an FIM Motocross World Championship. After winning two consecutive 250cc Motocross World Championships in 1984 and 1985, he became a successful Rally Raid competitor.

Together with Red Bull founder Dietrich Mateschitz, Kinigadner established the Wings for Life foundation in 2004, dedicated to finding a cure for spinal cord injuries. In 2016, Kinigadner was named an FIM Legend for his motorcycling achievements.

== Biography ==
=== Early life ===
Kinigadner was born in Uderns, Tyrol, on 28 January 1960. His family owned a third-generation bakery and he trained as a baker and confectioner before pursuing a professional motorcycle racing career. His father was an avid motorcyclist, competing in hillclimbing and ice racing. Kinigadner was the middle sibling with two brothers who all followed their father's lead and became enthusiastic motorcycle racers.

=== Motocross World Championships ===
Kinigadner began motocross racing in 1974 at the age of fourteen, and by 1979, he won the Austrian Motocross Championship in both the 125cc and 250cc classes riding Puch motorcycles. At the age of 20, he competed in his first Motocross World Championship event at the 1980 250cc West German Grand Prix as a privateer aboard a KTM motorcycle. He won the first heat race of his career riding a Yamaha YZ250 at the 1982 250cc Italian Grand Prix where he finished ahead of perennial World Championship contenders, Georges Jobé (Suzuki) and Kees van der Ven (KTM).

Kinigadner joined the KTM factory racing team in 1983. In the 1984 250cc Motocross World Championship, he won the season-opening 250cc French Grand Prix, then won in Czechoslovakia and Italy to take the championship points lead. He then withstood a late season challenge from Jacky Vimond (Yamaha) to clinch the world championship. His victory marked the first time that an Austrian competitor had won a Motocross World Championship since its inception in 1957. It also marked the first Motocross World Championship by a European manufacturer since 1979, when Håkan Carlqvist won the 250 title for Husqvarna.

Kinigadner and Vimond were the main contenders for the 1985 250cc Motocross World Championship. Each competitor won three Grand Prix races, and the championship was not decided until the final round in West Germany where Kinigadner placed second to clinch his second consecutive World Championship by a mere two points over Vimond.

=== 500 class ===
Kinigadner chose to compete in the premier 500cc Motocross World Championship for the 1986 season. The 500cc championship in the mid-1980s was extremely competitive with a talented field of riders including the powerful Honda factory team of David Thorpe, André Malherbe and Eric Geboers as well as Håkan Carlqvist riding for the Yamaha team and Georges Jobé for the Kawasaki team. Against the increased level of competition, Kinigadner finished the season 13th overall. He improved to a seventh place in 1987, with a victory in the first heat race at his home Grand Prix in Austria where he placed third overall behind David Thorpe and Georges Jobé.

Kinigadner won the final world championship event of his career at the 1987 500cc Belgian Grand Prix. The setting of the Belgian Grand Prix was a rugged, narrow track in the forests surrounding the picturesque hilltop Citadel of Namur. First held in 1947, the Namur Grand Prix was revered by motocross enthusiasts in the same manner that auto racing enthusiasts considered the Monaco Grand Prix to be the crown jewel of the Formula One season. Despite this success, the relatively small KTM factory struggled to compete with the technical resources available to the much larger Japanese manufacturers. Kinigadner competed in his final World Championship race at the 1988 250cc British Grand Prix at the age of 28.

== Career overview ==
Kinigadner won 12 individual heat races (1 500cc, 11 250cc) and 7 Grand Prix victories (1 500cc, 6 250cc) during his Motocross World Championship career. He was a two-time 250cc World Champion (1984, 1985} and an eight-time Austrian motocross national champion (125cc: 1979, 1980. 250cc: 1979, 1982-1984. 500cc: 1980, 1986). Kinigadner was a member of five Austrian Motocross des Nations teams (1980-1982, 1985, 1986) and four Trophée des Nations teams (1980, 1982, 1983).

== Rally racing career ==
In 1989, Kinigadner began competing in Rally raid races such as the Paris to Dakar rally and the Rallye des Pharaons. He claimed victories in the Rallye des Pharaons (1994), the Paris-Peking Rally, the Dubai Rally (1995, 1996, 1998) and the Brazil Rally (1998). In the 1995 Dakar Rally, Kinigadner claimed the most stage wins in a single Dakar edition, but he failed to finish the race due to a mechanical breakdown, which allowed Stéphane Peterhansel (Yamaha) to claim the victory. Despite 11 individual Dakar stage victories during his rally career, Kinigadner was never able to secure an overall victory at the event. His aggressive riding style helped KTM to engineer their motorcycles to endure the rigors of long-range off-road racing that eventually led to KTM's dominance of Rally Raid racing.

Kinigadner retired in 2000 after suffering a thigh fracture.

== Later life ==
In 1992, Kinigadner was named Sports Manager and Motorsport Consultant for KTM Motorsports, assisting Motorsports Director, Pit Beirer in overseeing the Red Bull KTM Factory Racing team in MotoGP as well as their off-road racing programs. He mentored three-time motocross world champion Matthias Walkner and encouraged him to switch to rally racing, just as Kinigadner had done.

After Kinigadner's older brother and son were paralyzed in motorcycle accidents, he helped start the Wings for Life foundation together with Dietrich Mateschitz, which is dedicated to finding a cure for spinal cord injuries. Being the first Austrian motocross world champion racing on an Austrian-made KTM motorcycle coupled with his rally racing exploits boosted his popularity in his native Austria.

== Motocross Grand Prix Results ==
Points system from 1969 to 1983:

Position	1	2	3	4	5	6	7	8	9	10
Points	15	12	10	8	6	5	4	3	2	1

Points system from 1984:

Position	1st	2nd	3rd	4th	5th	6th	7th	8th	9th	10th	11th	12th	13th	14th	15th
Points	20	17	15	13	11	10	9	8	7	6	5	4	3	2	1

Year	Class	Team	1		2		3		4		5		6		7		8		9		10		11		12		Pos	Pts
Year	Class	Team	R1	R2	R1	R2	R1	R2	R1	R2	R1	R2	R1	R2	R1	R2	R1	R2	R1	R2	R1	R2	R1	R2	R1	R2	Pos	Pts
1980	250cc	KTM	ESP -	ESP -	CZE -	CZE -	GER -	GER; 9	BEL; 8	BEL -	POL -	POL -	USR -	USR -	UK -	UK -	FRA -	FRA -	NED -	NED -	USA -	USA -	FIN -	FIN -	SWE -	SWE -	33rd	5
1982	250cc	Yamaha	CH; 7	CH -	ESP -	ESP; 4	BEL; 4	BEL -	CZE; 9	CZE -	ITA; 1	ITA; 3	FRA -	FRA -	UK -	UK -	NED -	NED -	USR; 3	USR -	USA -	USA -	FIN -	FIN -	SWE -	SWE -	9th	57
1983	250cc	KTM	ESP; 9	ESP; 9	FRA; 10	FRA; 3	ITA -	ITA -	NED -	NED -	BUL; 3	BUL; 7	GER; 9	GER -	UK -	UK -	CAN; 6	CAN -	USA -	USA -	CH -	CH -	SWE -	SWE -	FIN -	FIN -	11th	36
1984	250cc	KTM	FRA; 4	FRA; 1	AUT; 1	AUT -	YUG; 2	YUG -	CZE; 1	CZE; 1	UK; 3	UK; 6	ITA; 1	ITA; 1	GER; 11	GER -	USA; 8	USA; 10	NED; 5	NED -	BEL -	BEL -	CH; 6	CH; 2	FIN; 3	FIN -	1st	247
1985	250cc	KTM	RSA -	RSA; 8	CH; 4	CH; 7	AUT; 6	AUT; 12	ITA; 5	ITA; 5	BEL; 8	BEL; 1	CZE; 2	CZE; 1	FRA -	FRA; 2	ESP; 1	ESP; 2	USA; 6	USA; 6	NED; 4	NED; 4	USR; 4	USR; 1	GER; 2	GER; 6	1st	291
1986	500cc	KTM	CH -	CH -	AUT; 8	AUT; 9	NED -	NED -	SWE; 7	SWE; 7	FIN -	FIN; 7	GER; 9	GER -	CAN -	CAN -	USA -	USA -	FRA -	FRA -	UK -	UK -	BEL -	BEL -	LUX -	LUX -	13th	49
1987	500cc	KTM	ESP -	ESP; 12	FRA -	FRA -	AUT; 3	AUT; 8	FIN; 10	FIN; 5	SWE -	SWE -	GER; 7	GER; 3	ITA; 10	ITA; 4	UK -	UK; 14	NED -	NED -	BEL; 4	BEL; 1	LUX; 9	LUX; 5	CH -	CH -	7th	140
1988	250cc	KTM	FRA -	FRA -	ESP -	ESP -	ITA -	ITA -	CZE -	CZE -	UK -	UK; 4	BEL -	BEL -	GER -	GER -	YUG -	YUG -	USA -	USA -	VEN -	VEN -	ARG -	ARG -	SWE -	SWE -	13th	26
