= Roger De Coster =

Belgian motorcycle racer (born 1944)

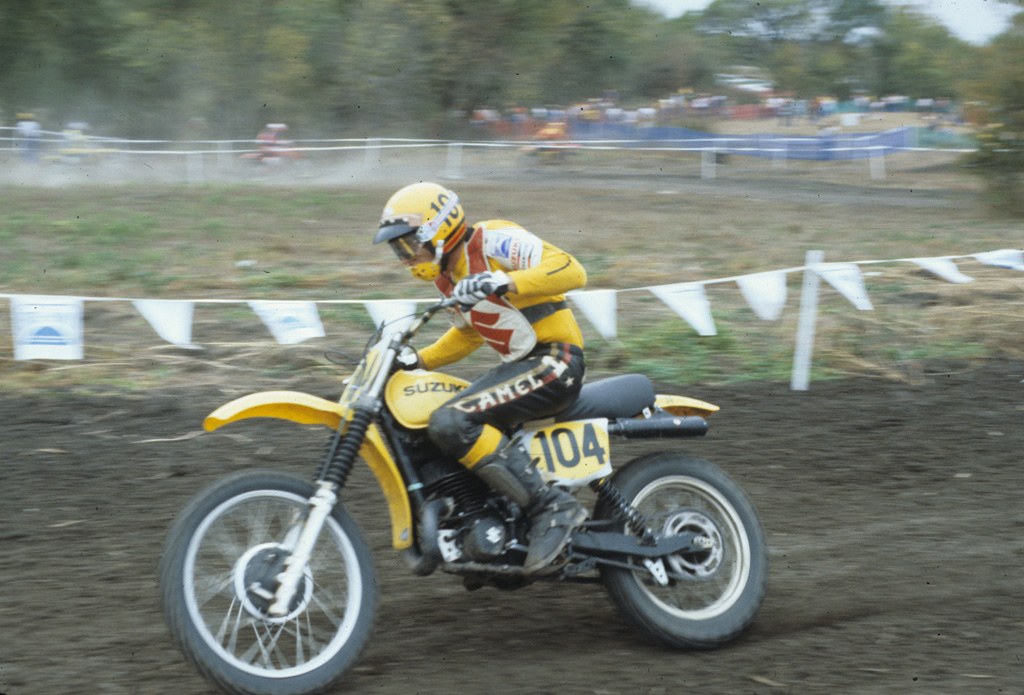
- Roger De Coster in 1977
- Nationality: Belgian
- Born: 28 August 1944 (age 82) Uccle, Belgium

Motocross career
- Years active: 1966–1980
- Teams: ČZ, Suzuki, Honda
- Championships: 500cc – 1971–1973, 1975, 1976
- Wins: 36

Roger De Coster (born 28 August 1944) is a Belgian former professional motocross racer and current Motorsport Director of KTM and Husqvarna North America. He competed in the Motocross World Championships from 1966 to 1980, most prominently as a member of the Suzuki factory racing team where he won five FIM 500cc Motocross World Championships.

De Coster scored a record 36 500cc Grand Prix victories during his racing career, making his name is almost synonymous with the sport of motocross during the 1970s. His stature in the sport of motocross is such that, he is often simply referred to as "The Man." In 1973, De Coster was named the recipient of the Belgian National Sports Merit Award.

As a team manager, De Coster captained the first American team to win the Motocross des Nations in 1981. De Coster was inducted into the AMA Motorcycle Hall of Fame in 1999. The motorcycling publication Cycle News named him Motocrosser of the Century in 2000. In 2010, he was named an FIM Legend for his motorcycling achievements.

== Motorcycling career ==
=== Early competition ===
De Coster was born in Uccle, Belgium as the son of a steel mill worker. With four brothers, his family could not afford to fund De Coster's motorcycle racing ambitions, but by working six days a week while still going to school, he was finally able to purchase a motorcycle when he was 17 years old. He began competing on a 50 cc Flandria motorcycle before replacing it with an Itom. After his first racing season, he started to compete in motorcycle trials to fill the winter lull.

De Coster's main competitor in trials events was future Formula One driver, Jacky Ickx. De Coster lost to Ickx during their first season in the 1963 Belgian 50 cc trials national championship. 1964 would be a break out year for De Coster as he won the 1964 Belgian 50cc Junior Motocross championship, and won a gold medal in the 1964 International Six Days Trial. The International Six Days Trial, now known as the International Six Days Enduro, is a form of off-road motorcycle Olympics which is the oldest annual competition sanctioned by the FIM dating back to 1913. He also defeated Ickx for the 1964 Belgian 50 cc trials national championship. His trials experience improved his riding ability in wet, slippery conditions which, would later become an asset during his motocross career.

=== International racing ===
De Coster began to work for ČZ motorcycles in their warranty department, but continued to race on his own time. He won the 1966 500cc Belgian Motocross National Championship competing on a ČZ, but his first foray into Grand Prix World Championships that same year was limited due to injuries suffered in a crash. De Coster was impressed by the meticulous bike preparation and efficient riding styles of Swedish riders such as world champion Torsten Hallman, observing how Hallman absorbed jumps with his body so that his motorcycle flew at half the height of his competitors which, allowed the rear tire to begin applying power to the ground sooner. De Coster was known for his smooth, controlled riding style and a commitment to physical training. His training regime gave him the stamina that allowed him to circulate for most of the race in mid-pack before putting in a late charge through the field to victory when other racers had begun to tire.

De Coster's performances earned him full sponsorship from the factory for the 1967 season in which, he ended year ranked fifth in the 500cc world championship. After the 1967 World Championship season, De Coster joined his ČZ factory teammates Joël Robert and Dave Bickers, along with Husqvarna teammates, Torsten Hallman, Arne Kring and Åke Jonsson, in a series of exhibition races in the United States that had been organized by Edison Dye, the American importer for Husqvarna motorcycles. The exhibition races served as a means to introduce the sport of motocross to an American audience, and eventually led to the formation of the Inter-AM and Trans-AMA motocross series that helped to popularize the sport of motocross in the United States.

In 1968, De Coster won his first overall victory with a win at the 500cc Italian Grand Prix, and once again ended the season ranked fifth in the world championship. De Coster ended the 1969 season ranked fifth in the world for a third consecutive season, and was a member of the Belgian team that won the 1969 Motocross des Nations for 500cc motorcycles and the Trophée des Nations for 250cc motorcycles, marking the first Belgian victory in eighteen years at the event. Despite his results, De Coster felt neglected by the lack of support from the ČZ factory.

Before the 1970 season, The Suzuki racing team hired the ČZ team's top two riders in the 250cc class, Joël Robert and Sylvain Geboers. To offset this loss, the ČZ team moved De Coster to the 250cc class for 1970, which would mark the beginning of De Coster's career-long battle with his arch-rival Heikki Mikkola. Suzuki teammates Robert and Geboers finished first and second in the 250cc world championship with De Coster coming in third place, just 1 point ahead of Mikkola.

=== Move to the Suzuki team ===
After the 1970 season, De Coster made the decision to leave the ČZ team due to their continued lack of support. He then joined the Suzuki factory racing team alongside his former ČZ teammate, Joël Robert. It was with the Suzuki team that De Coster would attain his greatest success. Whereas the ČZ motorcycle was already a proven winner, De Coster made the move to the Suzuki team knowing that he would have to help them develop their first 500cc motocross bike however, he was impressed with their willingness and ability to make requested changes to the motorcycle. De Coster's victory at the season opening Italian Grand Prix gave Suzuki the first ever victory for a Japanese factory in an FIM 500cc motocross Grand Prix. His main competition in 1971 came from Paul Friedrichs riding for ČZ and Bengt Åberg on a Husqvarna and the Maico team of Åke Jonsson and Adolf Weil. Going into the final race of the season, Jonsson held a slight points lead over De Coster. While leading the race, the spark plug on Jonnson's motorcycle came loose, allowing DeCoster to pass him for the victory and the 1971 World Championship.

With no weight limit rules imposed by the FIM, Suzuki and De Coster were able to develop extremely lightweight motorcycles for the 1972 season. De Coster led the 500cc World Championship from start to finish, winning six of twelve Grand Prix races to clinch the title with two races remaining on the schedule.

De Coster's defense of the 500cc world championship was dealt a setback when, the FIM announced a new motorcycle minimum weight limit of 209 pounds just before the start of the 1973 season. European motorcycle manufacturers competing in the championship complained to the FIM that Suzuki was spending millions of dollars to build lightweight motorcycles that the smaller European manufacturers found impossible to compete with. Suzuki had already developed and built their race bikes so, there was no time to build new motorcycles. As a result, Suzuki resorted to adding ballast to the bikes. Unfortunately, these alterations threw the bikes out of balance and caused them to lose traction.

To make matters worse, Maico and Yamaha had developed new rear suspension with longer travel which helped transfer power to the rear wheel over rough terrain. The Suzuki management felt they were being unjustly treated by the FIM and were slow to react to developments by the other manufacturers. Their frustration at their perceived unfair treatment led to a lapse in support and, Suzuki team riders De Coster and Sylvain Geboers then took matters into their own hands by modifying their motorcycle's frames and developed new rear suspension.

Going into the final race of the season at Sint Anthonis, Holland, Maico's Willy Bauer was holding the championship points lead. The Sint Anthonis track was composed of deep sand which robbed engines of power and increased fuel consumption. A Suzuki engineer calculated that their bike's gas tanks did not have sufficient capacity to finish the race. De Coster then took one of their tanks and drove two and a half hours to have the tank modified to increase its volume. He then drove back in time for the race. Despite having little sleep, De Coster scored two fourth-place finishes while Bauer suffered a mechanical failure handing De Coster his third consecutive 500cc world championship just two points ahead of Bauer.

=== Mikkola rivalry ===
Suzuki provided De Coster' motorcycles with new engines and an improved suspension system for the 1974 FIM Motocross World Championship season however, the team suffered from poor reliability as they struggled through development issues on the new motorcycles. He faced strong competition in the form of Heikki Mikkola riding for the Husqvarna factory racing team as, the two riders dominated the world championship with either De Coster or Mikkola winning 17 out of 22 motos. Mikkola won the first four Grand Prix races of the season before, De Coster was able to win the Czechoslovak Grand Prix. While Mikkola's Husqvarna showed a perfect mechanical reliability by finishing every race, De Coster' Suzuki suffered mechanical breakdowns while he was leading five races.

Mikkola missed the German Grand Prix due to injuries suffered in practice, allowing De Coster to narrow Mikkola's lead in the championship to ten points going into the final two events of the season, meaning that De Coster would have to win three of the last four motos to secure his fourth consecutive 500cc world championship. The setting of the Belgian Grand Prix was a rugged, narrow track in the forests surrounding the picturesque hilltop Citadel of Namur. First held in 1947, the Namur Grand Prix was revered by motocross enthusiasts in the same manner that auto racing enthusiasts considered the Monaco Grand Prix to be the crown jewel of the Formula One season.

Wolsink took the lead at the start of the first race while Mikkola and De Coster battled their way to the front of the pack. When Wolsink's engine seized, the two series points leaders once again found themselves first and second with Mikkola holding on to the lead to the end of the race. De Coster had to win the final three races to overtake Mikkola for the championship. Wolsink once again grabbed the early lead in the second race but, soon crashed allowing De Coster into the lead with Mikkola in second place. De Coster continued to widen his lead to win the second moto to extend the championship points battle to the final race of the season in Luxembourg.

In the championship's final event at the Luxembourg Grand Prix, De Coster worked his way through the pack to take the lead before his Suzuki suffered an engine problem, forcing him out of the race and losing the world championship to Mikkola by 9 points. De Coster was magnanimous in defeat stating that, Mikkola deserved to win the world championship. After the world championship season ended, De Coster participated in the 1974 Trans-AMA motocross series in the United States where, he took four victories to win the series ahead of his Suzuki teammate Gerrit Wolsink.

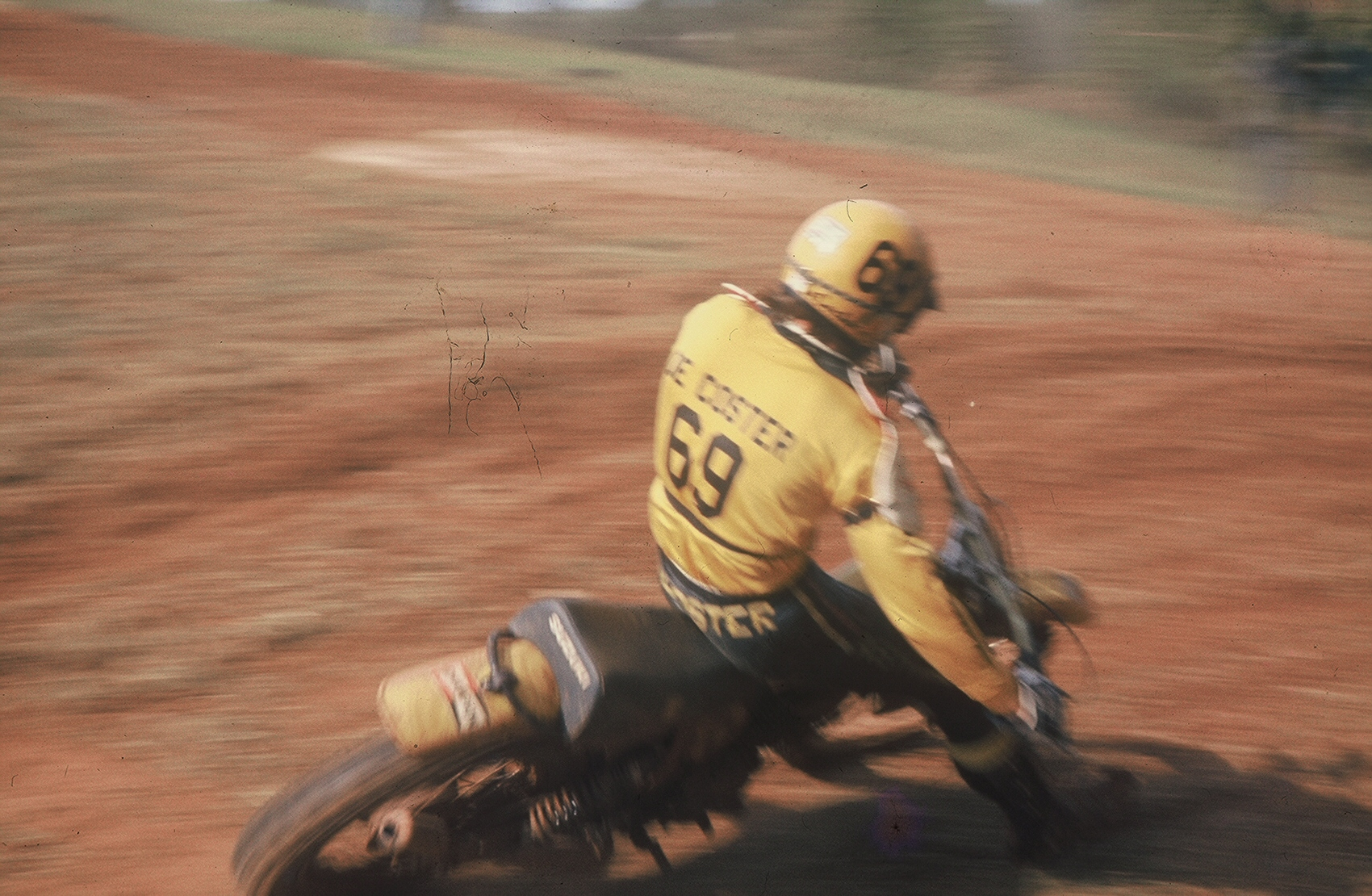
De Coster competing in the 1974 Trans-AMA motocross series

De Coster and Suzuki returned with the same motorcycle for the 1975 season however, after a year of development work, the bike was more balanced and reliable. De Coster won 12 out of 24 motos during the season to claim his fourth 500cc world championship over second place Mikkola. The Husqvarna team asked Mikkola to switch to the 250cc world championship in 1976, leaving De Coster to battle his Suzuki teammate Wolsink for the 500cc championship. Wolsink had seven moto victories against the nine victories by De Coster meaning that, both riders had a chance to win the championship going into the final race of the year in Luxembourg where, De Coster secured enough points to claim his fifth 500cc world championship. He also won a third consecutive Trans-AMA motocross series championship in the United States.

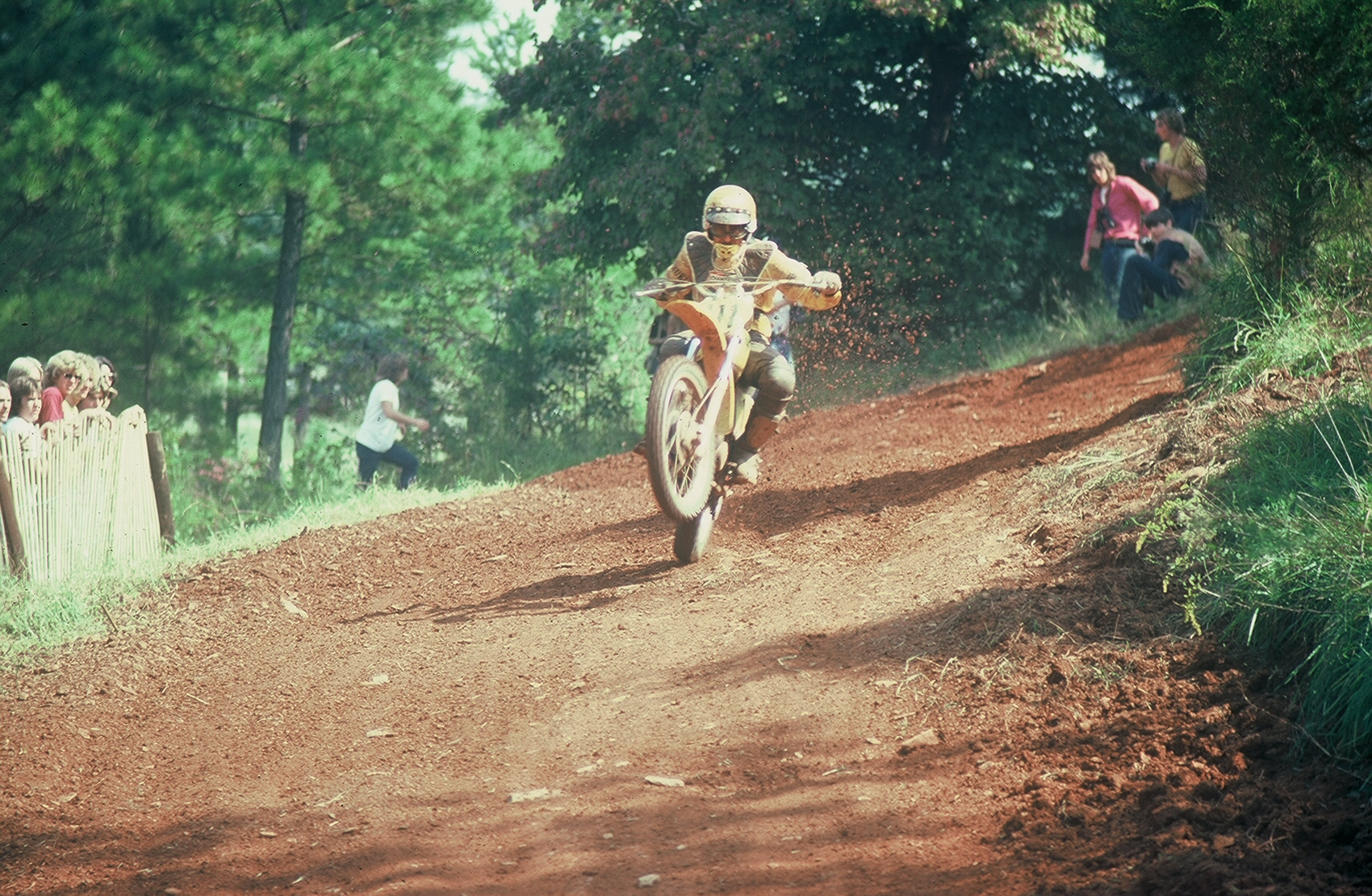
De Coster at Road Atlanta Motocross in 1975

De Coster's rival Mikkola returned to the 500cc class for the 1977 FIM Motocross World Championship season, this time as a Yamaha factory team rider. De Coster won the season-opening Austrian Grand Prix, but then Mikkola and Yamaha went on to dominate the season by winning 8 out of 12 Grands Prix as, De Coster finished in second place.

In the 1977 Trans-AMA series, De Coster faced his toughest American challenge to date from Yamaha's Bob Hannah, who won more motos than any other competitor in the series including De Coster, however he failed to score points in two rounds due to mechanical failures, which allowed De Coster to win his fourth consecutive Trans-AMA title. At the time, De Coster said of Hannah, "Hannah's good, but he also thinks he's good, which is something that he shouldn't do. At least not until he has more experience to go along with it."

In 1978, De Coster was seriously injured in an accident during pre-season training and had to have his spleen removed. De Coster recovered, but the loss of his spleen affected his fitness, and he dropped to third in the 500cc world championship as, Mikkola repeated as the 500cc motocross world champion. Because of his preseason injuries, De Coster had lost time developing his Suzuki race bike, and he planned to use the fall of 1978 to test new motorcycles and prepare himself for the 1979 season. He did not want to return to America to compete in the 1978 Trans-AMA Series, however he was contractually obligated by Suzuki to defend his Trans-AMA Series championship. De Coster would finish second to Hannah in the series.

1979 would be De Coster's final season with the Suzuki team. He won only one moto at the Belgian Grand Prix and he ended the season ranked sixth in the 500cc world championship standings. After Suzuki refused to renew his contract, De Coster accepted an offer to race for the Honda factory racing team. He raced one final season in 1980 and ended his riding career on a high note by winning his final world championship race — the 500cc Motocross Grand Prix of Luxembourg.

=== Career overview ===
De Coster won 71 individual heat races and 36 Grand Prix victories during his world championship racing career. He won five 500cc motocross world titles (1971-1973, 1975-1976) and ten Belgian motocross national championships (1962-1964, 1966, 1970, 1972, 1974-1977). He was part of ten consecutive Belgian team victories at the Trophée des Nations event (1969-1978), and six Belgian Motocross des Nations victories (1969, 1972, 1973, 1976, 1977, 1979). De Coster was the top individual points scorer at the Motocross des Nations events in 1972, 1973 and 1976. He was also the top individual points scorer at the Trophée des Nations events in 1972, 1973, 1976 and 1977. De Coster was a four-time winner of the Trans-AMA motocross series in the United States. De Coster holds the record for most Grand Prix victories at the Citadel of Namur motocross circuit with seven. First held in 1947, the Namur circuit was known as the Monaco of the motocross grand prix circuit in reference to the prestigious Formula One race.

== Team management ==
After his racing career, De Coster moved to the U.S. and remained involved in the sport, becoming the motocross team manager for Honda. In 1981, the Motocross des Nations team initially chosen to represent the United States featured many of the best motocross racers in America, but several of the manufacturers dropped out of the event due to expenses. De Coster convinced Honda to send an underdog team of Donnie Hansen, Danny LaPorte, Johnny O'Mara and Chuck Sun to compete in the Motocross des Nations. The upset victory by American riders in the 1981 Motocross des Nations indicated that American riders had risen to the top sport of motocross after years of European domination. The victory began a 13-year period of domination by American teams at the Motocross des Nations.

De Coster rejoined Suzuki as their motocross team manager in 1999 and helped turn around a program that had been in decline since his departure. De Coster managed Suzuki team rider Greg Albertyn win Suzuki's first AMA 250cc national championship in 18 years.

In 2011, De Coster became the team manager for the Red Bull KTM team. He has also managed Team USA in the Motocross des Nations. In August 2018, De Coster was promoted to official Motorsport Director of KTM and Husqvarna North America, responsible for all racing efforts of both brands in the United States.

== Awards ==
De Coster was inducted into the Motorsports Hall of Fame of America in 1994, becoming only the seventh motorcyclist in the Hall. In 1999, he was inducted into the AMA Motorcycle Hall of Fame. In 2010, he was named an FIM Legend for his motorcycling achievements.

== Motocross Grand Prix Results ==
Points system from 1952 to 1968:

Position	1st	2nd	3rd	4th	5th	6th
Points	8	6	4	3	2	1

Points system from 1969 to 1980:

Position	1	2	3	4	5	6	7	8	9	10
Points	15	12	10	8	6	5	4	3	2	1

Year	Class	Team	1		2		3		4		5		6		7		8		9		10		11		12		13		14		15		Pos	Pts
Year	Class	Team	R1	R2	R1	R2	R1	R2	R1	R2	R1	R2	R1	R2	R1	R2	R1	R2	R1	R2	R1	R2	R1	R2	R1	R2	R1	R2	R1	R2	R1	R2	Pos	Pts
1965	250cc	ČZ	ESP -	ESP -	ITA -	ITA -	FRA -	FRA -	BEL -	BEL; 11	TCH -	TCH -	GER -	GER -	NED -	NED -	LUX -	LUX -	POL -	POL -	USR -	USR -	GDR -	GDR -	UK -	UK -	SWE -	SWE -	FIN -	FIN -	AUT -	AUT -	2nd	48
1966	250cc	ČZ	ESP -	ESP -	FRA; 7	FRA; 4	BEL; 2	BEL; 6	CH; 6	CH; 7	TCH; 8	TCH -	GER; 5	GER; 5	NED -	NED; 13	LUX; 2	LUX; 6	ITA; 6	ITA; 2	POL; 5	POL; 4	GDR -	GDR -	SWE -	SWE -	FIN -	FIN -	USR -	USR -	AUT -	AUT -	7th	23
1966	500cc	ČZ	CH -	CH -	AUT -	AUT -	ITA -	ITA -	DEN -	DEN -	SWE -	SWE -	FIN -	FIN -	GDR -	GDR -	TCH -	TCH -	USR -	USR -	UK -	UK -	NED -	NED -	BEL; 5	BEL; 1	LUX -	LUX -	GER -	GER -			12th	6
1967	250cc	ČZ	ESP -	ESP -	CH -	CH -	FRA -	FRA -	BEL; 6	BEL; 4	GER -	GER -	NED -	NED -	ITA -	ITA -	UK -	UK -	SWE -	SWE -	FIN -	FIN -	USR -	USR -	POL -	POL -							19th	2
1967	500cc	ČZ	AUT; 10	AUT; 11	ITA -	ITA -	SWE -	SWE -	TCH; 2	TCH; 5	USR -	USR -	FRA; 9	FRA -	GER; 8	GER; 8	UK; 8	UK -	BEL; 3	BEL; 4	LUX; 9	LUX; 2	CH; 2	CH; 5									5th	19
1968	500cc	ČZ	AUT; 11	AUT -	ITA; 1	ITA; 1	SWE; 5	SWE; 5	FIN; 9	FIN; 9	GDR -	GDR -	TCH -	TCH -	UK; 5	UK; 6	GER; 10	GER -	FRA; 1	FRA; 3	NED; 4	NED; 12	BEL; 4	BEL -	LUX -	LUX -	CH; 7	CH -					5th	21
1969	500cc	ČZ	AUT; 20	AUT; 5	SWE -	SWE -	NED; 7	NED; 30	ITA; 4	ITA; 4	TCH; 7	TCH; 8	USR -	USR -	GER; 8	GER; 10	BEL; 1	BEL; 2	LUX -	LUX -	FRA; 3	FRA; 4	CH; 3	CH; 3	GDR; 3	GDR; 1							5th	66
1970	250cc	ČZ	ESP; 8	ESP; 4	FRA; 2	FRA; 4	BEL; 3	BEL; 3	YUG -	YUG; 7	ITA; 2	ITA -	USR; 12	USR -	POL; 2	POL; 2	UK; 3	UK; 2	FIN; 4	FIN; 5	GDR; 4	GDR; 2	CH; 3	CH; 4	AUT; 7	AUT; 2							3rd	87
1970	500cc	ČZ	CH -	CH -	AUT -	AUT -	NED -	NED -	FRA -	FRA -	FIN -	FIN -	SWE -	SWE -	TCH -	TCH -	USR -	USR -	GER -	GER -	GDR -	GDR -	BEL; 1	BEL; 2	LUX -	LUX -							13th	15
1971	500cc	Suzuki	ITA; 1	ITA; 1	AUT; 2	AUT; 26	SWE; 1	SWE; 2	FIN; 4	FIN; 6	TCH; 1	TCH; 2	USR; 4	USR; 3	GDR -	GDR -	UK; 2	UK; 4	GER; 2	GER; 3	BEL; 1	BEL; 1	LUX; 1	LUX; 2	NED; 1	NED; 2							1st	97
1972	500cc	Suzuki	AUT; 1	AUT; 1	CH; 2	CH; 2	SWE; 1	SWE; 3	FRA; 5	FRA -	USR; 1	USR; 2	TCH; 1	TCH -	UK; 1	UK; 3	GER; 1	GER; 1	GDR; 1	GDR; 3	BEL; 1	BEL; 1	LUX -	LUX -									1st	90
1973	500cc	Suzuki	FRA -	FRA; 1	AUT -	AUT -	FIN -	FIN; 1	ITA; 1	ITA; 1	TCH; 2	TCH; 2	USA; 2	USA -	GER; 2	GER; 1	BEL; 2	BEL; 3	LUX -	LUX -	NED; 4	NED; 4											1st	161
1974	500cc	Suzuki	AUT -	AUT; 9	FRA; 2	FRA; 2	ITA -	ITA; 1	DEN -	DEN; 1	TCH; 2	TCH; 1	GER; 3	GER; 5	UK -	UK; 1	USA; 1	USA; 3	NED; 3	NED; 1	BEL; 2	BEL; 1	LUX -	LUX; 2									2nd	203
1975	500cc	Suzuki	CH; 2	CH; 1	ITA -	ITA -	FIN; 1	FIN; 1	USR; 2	USR; 1	FRA; 1	FRA; 1	USA; 1	USA; 9	CAN; 1	CAN -	UK -	UK; 1	GER; 1	GER; 1	NED -	NED; 3	BEL; 2	BEL; 2	LUX; 1	LUX; 2							1st	252
1976	500cc	Suzuki	CH -	CH -	FRA; 5	FRA; 1	ITA; 1	ITA; 2	AUT; 2	AUT; 1	SWE; 1	SWE; 1	FIN; 7	FIN; 1	GER; 1	GER; 1	USA -	USA -	CAN; 2	CAN -	UK; 3	UK; 2	BEL; 1	BEL; 2	LUX -	LUX; 4							1st	223
1977	500cc	Suzuki	AUT; 1	AUT; 3	NED; 3	NED; 3	SWE; 3	SWE; 3	FIN; 4	FIN; 5	GER; 2	GER; 3	ITA; 4	ITA; 1	USA; 2	USA -	CAN; 2	CAN; 4	UK -	UK -	BEL; 1	BEL -	LUX; 2	LUX; 2	CH; 2	CH; 1							2nd	222
1978	500cc	Suzuki	CH; 2	CH; 4	AUT -	AUT; 1	FRA -	FRA; 4	DEN; 3	DEN; 4	FIN; 5	FIN -	SWE; 2	SWE; 3	USA; 2	USA -	ITA; 2	ITA; 3	UK -	UK; 6	BEL; 10	BEL -	LUX; 1	LUX; 3	NED; 5	NED; 2							3rd	172
1979	500cc	Suzuki	AUT; 10	AUT; 4	FRA; 6	FRA -	SWE -	SWE; 3	ITA; 2	ITA; 7	USA; 2	USA -	CAN -	CAN; 7	GER; 3	GER; 4	UK; 3	UK; 3	CH -	CH; 3	NED -	NED -	BEL; 1	BEL; 5	LUX -	LUX -							6th	126
1980	500cc	Honda	CH; 5	CH -	AUT; 6	AUT; 4	FRA -	FRA; 5	SWE -	SWE -	FIN; 2	FIN -	ITA; 1	ITA; 3	NED -	NED -	USA -	USA -	CAN; 4	CAN; 9	GER; 3	GER; 4	BEL; 2	BEL; 8	LUX; 1	LUX; 1							5th	136
