= 1979 FIM Motocross World Championship =

Motocross championship season

- Organizer: FIM
- Duration: 8 April/12 August
- Number of races: 36
- Number of manufacturers: 18

Champions
- 500cc: (United Kingdom) Graham Noyce
- 250cc: (Sweden) Håkan Carlqvist
- 125cc: (Belgium) Harry Everts

FIM Motocross World Championship
- ← 1978 1980 →

The 1979 FIM Motocross World Championship was the 23rd F.I.M. Motocross Racing World Championship season.

== Summary ==
As the 1970s came to an end, it also marked a changing of the guard in the 500cc Motocross World Championships. Roger De Coster (Suzuki) and Heikki Mikkola (Yamaha) had dominated the premier class during the 1970s, between them winning every World Championship from 1971 to 1978. That streak came to an end in 1979 as Mikkola struggled to recover from a broken leg suffered in preseason and De Coster was still feeling the effects from his serious injuries in 1978.

Despite only winning two Grand Prix races, Graham Noyce (Honda) won the 1979 500cc World Championship by consistently scoring points in all but two races. Noyce earned the championship points lead at the midpoint of the season with Suzuki's Gerrit Wolsink, Mikkola and Kawasaki's Brad Lackey within reach of the points lead. Wolsink won his fifth 500cc United States Grand Prix in six years and followed that with another victory at the Canadian Grand Prix to narrow the points lead. Mikkola then suffered another injury at the Canadian Grand Prix and his injuries forced him to sit out the West German Grand Prix. Former Honda factory rider, Lackey, won 6 individual moto victories, more than any other rider in the championship yet, his factory sponsored Kawasaki proved to be unreliable as the team struggled through development issues on a new motorcycle. Noyce then took command of the championship by posting a series of top five finishes to win the title for the Honda team.

The victory marked the Honda factory's first ever motocross world championship as well as the first motocross world championship for a British rider since Jeff Smith in 1965. Four-time World Champion Mikkola made the decision to retire from competition at the end of the 1979 season. Jean-Jacques Bruno won the first heat race at the French Grand Prix to become the first French competitor in history to win a 500cc World Championship heat race. He then won the 500cc West German Grand Prix to become the first French 500cc Motocross Grand Prix winner.

Håkan Carlqvist won six of the twelve Grand Prix events, finishing comfortably ahead of second-placed Neil Hudson to be crowned the 250cc World Champion. Harry Everts dominated the 125cc world championship for the Suzuki factory racing team.

== Grands Prix ==
=== 500cc ===
Round	Date	Grand Prix	Location	Race 1 Winner	Race 2 Winner	Overall Winner	Report
1	April 22	(Austria) Austrian Grand Prix	Sittendorf	(Belgium) Yvan van den Broeck	(United States) Brad Lackey	(United Kingdom) Graham Noyce	Report
2	April 29	(France) French Grand Prix	Thours	(France) Jean-Jacques Bruno	(United States) Brad Lackey	(United States) Brad Lackey	Report
3	May 13	(Sweden) Swedish Grand Prix	Huskvarna	(United States) Brad Lackey	(Netherlands) Gerrit Wolsink	(Netherlands) Gerrit Wolsink	Report
4	May 27	(Italy) Italian Grand Prix	Faenza	(Finland) Heikki Mikkola	(Finland) Heikki Mikkola	(Finland) Heikki Mikkola	Report
5	June 10	United States Grand Prix	Carlsbad	(Netherlands) Gerrit Wolsink	(United States) Brad Lackey	(Netherlands) Gerrit Wolsink	Report
6	June 17	(Canada) Canadian Grand Prix	Mosport	(United Kingdom) Graham Noyce	(Netherlands) Gerrit Wolsink	(Netherlands) Gerrit Wolsink	Report
7	June 24	(West Germany) West German Grand Prix	Beuren	(France) Jean-Jacques Bruno	(Belgium) André Malherbe	(France) Jean-Jacques Bruno	Report
8	July 1	(United Kingdom) British Grand Prix	Farleigh Castle	(United States) Brad Lackey	(United Kingdom) Graham Noyce	(United Kingdom) Graham Noyce	Report
9	July 8	(Switzerland) Swiss Grand Prix	Payerne	(Finland) Heikki Mikkola	(Finland) Heikki Mikkola	(Finland) Heikki Mikkola	Report
10	July 29	(Netherlands) Dutch Grand Prix	Markelo	(United Kingdom) Graham Noyce	(Netherlands) Gerrit Wolsink	(Netherlands) Gerrit Wolsink	Report
11	August 5	(Belgium) Belgian Grand Prix	Namur	(Belgium) Roger De Coster	(Belgium) André Malherbe	(Belgium) André Malherbe	Report
12	August 12	Luxembourg Grand Prix	Ettelbruck	(United States) Brad Lackey	(Belgium) André Malherbe	(Belgium) André Malherbe	Report

=== 250cc ===
Round	Date	Grand Prix	Location	Race 1 Winner	Race 2 Winner	Overall Winner	Report
1	April 8	(Spain) Spanish Grand Prix	Sabadell	(Czech Republic) Jaroslav Falta	(Sweden) Håkan Carlqvist	(Sweden) Håkan Carlqvist	Report
2	April 22	(Netherlands) Dutch Grand Prix	Halle	(Sweden) Håkan Carlqvist	(Sweden) Håkan Carlqvist	(Sweden) Håkan Carlqvist	Report
3	April 29	(Italy) Italian Grand Prix	Bra	(United Kingdom) Neil Hudson	(Sweden) Håkan Carlqvist	(United Kingdom) Neil Hudson	Report
4	May 6	(Belgium) Belgian Grand Prix	Genk	(United Kingdom) Neil Hudson	(Sweden) Håkan Carlqvist	(United Kingdom) Neil Hudson	Report
5	May 20	(Socialist Federal Republic of Yugoslavia) Yugoslavian Grand Prix	Karlovac	(Sweden) Håkan Carlqvist	(United Kingdom) Neil Hudson	(United Kingdom) Neil Hudson	Report
6	May 27	(Czech Republic) Czechoslovak Grand Prix	Holice	(Sweden) Håkan Carlqvist	(Sweden) Håkan Carlqvist	(Sweden) Håkan Carlqvist	Report
7	June 10	(Poland) Polish Grand Prix	Szczecin	(Sweden) Håkan Carlqvist	(Sweden) Håkan Carlqvist	(Sweden) Håkan Carlqvist	Report
8	June 17	(France) French Grand Prix	Lavaur	(Sweden) Håkan Carlqvist	(Sweden) Håkan Carlqvist	(Sweden) Håkan Carlqvist	Report
9	July 1	(Finland) Finnish Grand Prix	Hyvinkää	(Netherlands) Kees van der Ven	(United Kingdom) Neil Hudson	(Netherlands) Kees van der Ven	Report
10	July 29	United States Grand Prix	Unadilla	(United States) Marty Tripes	(United States) Bob Hannah	(United States) Kent Howerton	Report
11	August 5	(West Germany) West German Grand Prix	Bielstein	(Sweden) Håkan Carlqvist	(Sweden) Håkan Carlqvist	(Sweden) Håkan Carlqvist	Report
12	August 12	(Bulgaria) Bulgarian Grand Prix	Samokov	(Soviet Union) Gennady Moiseyev	(Soviet Union) Gennady Moiseyev	(Soviet Union) Gennady Moiseyev	Report

=== 125cc ===
Round	Date	Grand Prix	Location	Race 1 Winner	Race 2 Winner	Overall Winner	Report
1	April 8	(Austria) Austrian Grand Prix	Launsdorf	(Belgium) Harry Everts	(Belgium) Harry Everts	(Belgium) Harry Everts	Report
2	April 15	(West Germany) West German Grand Prix	Goldbach	(Belgium) Harry Everts	(Belgium) Harry Everts	(Belgium) Harry Everts	Report
3	May 13	(Netherlands) Dutch Grand Prix	Mill	(Belgium) Harry Everts	(Belgium) Harry Everts	(Belgium) Harry Everts	Report
4	May 20	(Italy) Italian Grand Prix	Esanatoglia	(Japan) Akira Watanabe	(Japan) Akira Watanabe	(Japan) Akira Watanabe	Report
5	June 10	(Finland) Finnish Grand Prix	Tampere	(Belgium) Harry Everts	(Belgium) Harry Everts	(Belgium) Harry Everts	Report
6	June 17	(Czech Republic) Czechoslovak Grand Prix	Dalečín	(Belgium) Harry Everts	(Belgium) Harry Everts	(Belgium) Harry Everts	Report
7	June 24	(Socialist Federal Republic of Yugoslavia) Yugoslavian Grand Prix	Karlovac	(Japan) Akira Watanabe	(Belgium) Harry Everts	(Belgium) Harry Everts	Report
8	July 1	(Switzerland) Swiss Grand Prix	Schupfart	(Belgium) Harry Everts	(Belgium) Gaston Rahier	(Italy) Mauro Miele	Report
9	July 8	(France) French Grand Prix	Sucé-sur-Erdre	(Belgium) Harry Everts	(Belgium) Harry Everts	(Belgium) Harry Everts	Report
10	July 15	(Republic of Ireland) Irish Grand Prix	Slane	(Belgium) Harry Everts	(Belgium) Harry Everts	(Belgium) Harry Everts	Report
11	July 22	United States Grand Prix	Lexington	(United States) Broc Glover	(United States) Mark Barnett	(United States) Mark Barnett	Report
12	August 12	(Spain) Spanish Grand Prix	Montgai	(Belgium) Harry Everts	(Belgium) Harry Everts	(Belgium) Harry Everts	Report

== Final standings ==
Points are awarded based on the results of each individual heat race. The top 10 classified finishers in each heat race score points according to the following scale;

Position	1st	2nd	3rd	4th	5th	6th	7th	8th	9th	10th
Points	15	12	10	8	6	5	4	3	2	1

=== 500cc ===
(Results in italics indicate overall winner)

Pos	Rider	Machine	AUT (Austria)		FRA (France)		SWE (Sweden)		ITA (Italy)		USA (United States)		CAN (Canada)		RFA (West Germany)		UK (United Kingdom)		CH (Switzerland)		NED (Netherlands)		BEL (Belgium)		LUX (Luxembourg)		Points
1	(United Kingdom) Graham Noyce	Honda	2	2	2	7	2	6	3	3	3	5	1	3	6	2	2	1	2	5	1	2	3		4		225
2	(Netherlands) Gerrit Wolsink	Suzuki	3	3	7	8	4	1	10	6	1	3	2	1	5	3	4	8		6	2	1				3	177
3	(Belgium) André Malherbe	Honda	6		5	2	6		5	4			5	4	7	1	6	2	3	2		4	2	1	2	1	176
4	(United States) Brad Lackey	Kawasaki	5	1	3	1	1		4			1	4	2		9	1	4		4		8	9	7	1	2	173
5	(Finland) Heikki Mikkola	Yamaha			4	3	3	2	1	1		2						5	1	1	3	3			10	4	147
6	(Belgium) Roger De Coster	Suzuki	10	4	6			3	2	7	2			7	3	4	3	3		3			1	5			125
7	(Belgium) André Vromans	Suzuki		8		6	5		9	2	5		7	5			5	6			4	5	8	6	5	8	86
8	(France) Jean-Jacques Bruno	KTM	4	9	1	5		7		8	7		8	6	1	5			5					4			85
9	(Belgium) Yvan van den Broeck	Maico	1	6	8	9	8						3	8	9		9	7	4	8				3	6		75
10	(Netherlands) Gérard Rond	Suzuki	8	5	9	4	7	4					6		8				7	7	5		4	2			73
11	(West Germany) Herbert Schmitz	Maico	7				10		6	9	6		9		4					10	8		6		3		46
12	(West Germany) Fritz Köbele	Maico	9	7		10		5	8							7			6				5				31
13	(Denmark) Arne Lodal	Husqvarna												9		10			8	9	6	6				7	22
14	(Sweden) Bengt Åberg	Maico		10											2	6											18
15	(Sweden) Håkan Andersson	Husqvarna					9																7		7	5	16
16	(United States) Chuck Sun	Husqvarna			10			9		10	4	9															14
17	(United Kingdom) Bob Wright	CCM							7	5																	10
18	(United States) Marty Smith	Honda									10	4															9
18	(Republic of Ireland) Laurence Spence	Cotton - Rotax															8		10					10	9	9	9
20	(United States) Rick Burgett	Yamaha									9	6															7
20	(United States) Jimmy Weinert	Kawasaki																						9		6	7
22	(United Kingdom) Peter Mathia	Maico																				9	10	8			6
22	(United States) Rex Staten	Yamaha									8	8															6
24	(Sweden) Arne Lindfors	Yamaha						8											9								5
25	(United States) Danny LaPorte	Suzuki										7															4
25	(United Kingdom) Geoff Mayes	Maico															7										4
25	(Netherlands) Toon Karsmakers	Maico																			7						4
25	(Finland) Tapani Pikkarainen	Suzuki																				7					4
25	(West Germany) Ludwig Reinbold	KTM													10	8											4
30	(Belgium) Raymond Heeren	Yamaha																							8		3
30	(United States) Parry Klassen	Maico										10	10	10													3
32	(United Kingdom) Steve Beamish	Suzuki																9									2
32	(Netherlands) Frantz Sigmans	Maico																			9						2
32	(United Kingdom) Vic Allan	Bultaco															10	10									2
35	(Netherlands) Peter Herlings	Maico						10																			1
35	(Netherlands) Ad Verstegen	Maico																			10						1
35	(Netherlands) Henk Poorte	Montesa																				10					1
35	(Switzerland) Herbert Salzmann	Husqvarna																								10	1

=== 250cc ===
(Results in italics indicate overall winner)

Pos	Rider	Machine	ESP (Spain)		NED (Netherlands)		ITA (Italy)		BEL (Belgium)		YUG (Socialist Federal Republic of Yugoslavia)		CZE (Czech Republic)		POL (Poland)		FRA (France)		FIN (Finland)		USA (United States)		GER (West Germany)		BUL (Bulgaria)		Points
1	(Sweden) Håkan Carlqvist	Husqvarna	2	1	1	1		1	3	1	1	5	1	1	1	1	1	1				3	1	1			248
2	(United Kingdom) Neil Hudson	Maico	5	3	4	5	1	4	1	2	2	1	2		3			3		1			2	2			178
3	(Soviet Union) Vladimir Kavinov	KTM	6	8	6		2	3			5	3		5	6	4	2	4	2	2	5		6	4			133
4	(Soviet Union) Gennady Moiseyev	KTM		6	2	3		2	2	3			3						8	5	4	4			1	1	126
5	(Netherlands) Kees van der Ven	Maico			5	2			5					9	2	8	10	7	1	3	8	5	5	3	7	5	106
6	(West Germany) Rolf Dieffenbach	Kawasaki	3	7			3	6	4	9		4			4	3		2	3					7	4		99
7	(Belgium) Georges Jobé	Suzuki				8	9			5	6	8		3	7	2	3		4		9		9		9	9	71
8	(Belgium) Jean-Claude Laquaye	SWM					10				3	6	5	6	5	5		6				10	7		2	6	66
9	(Belgium) Jaak van Velthoven	KTM	10	10		6	4	9	6	4				8		7	5							10	6	2	61
10	(Czech Republic) Jaroslav Falta	ČZ	1	5			6	7			7		4						5						3		58
11	(Japan) Torao Suzuki	Montesa									9	7	6	4				5		6				5		3	46
12	(United Kingdom) Vaughan Semmens	Maico	4				7	10							10		6		9	7			3		8		38
13	(West Germany) Hans Maisch	Maico		4		9	5	5				2				9											36
14	(Finland) Erkki Sundström	Husqvarna			10	7			9				7	10	8	6	8					8				4	34
15	(Netherlands) Bennie Wilken	Maico			3	4			10	6							9							9			28
16	(Belgium) Raymond Boven	Husqvarna								7		9						10	6			6	10	6		8	26
17	(United States) Bob Hannah	Yamaha																			3	1					25
17	(United States) Jim Pomeroy	Bultaco / Beta		9			8				4			7									4				25
19	(United States) Kent Howerton	Suzuki																			2	2					24
20	(Spain) Antonio Elias	Bultaco	8	2								10						8									19
21	(Czech Republic) Zdeněk Velký	ČZ											9	2											10		15
21	(United States) Marty Tripes	Honda																			1						15
21	(Italy) Ivan Alborghetti	KTM						8			8						7	9						8			15
24	(Soviet Union) Pavel Rulev	ČZ																							5	7	10
25	(Sweden) Magnus Nyberg	KTM																	10	4							9
25	(United States) Mike Guerra	Husqvarna																			6	7					9
25	(United Kingdom) Rob Hooper	Husqvarna									10		10			10			7	9							9
28	(Italy) Pier Antonio Dal Brun	Aprilia															4										8
29	(Belgium) Pierre Schroyen	KTM							7	8																	7
30	(Norway) Jan Kristoffersen	Yamaha	9							10					9												5
31	(Spain) Fernando Muñoz	Montesa	7																								4
31	(Netherlands) Pierre Karsmakers	Yamaha			7																						4
31	(United States) Mark Gregson	Yamaha																			7						4
34	(Netherlands) Henk Van Mierlo	KTM			8																						3
34	(France) Daniel Péan	Montesa							8																		3
34	(Bulgaria) Dimitar Rangelov	ČZ											8														3
34	(Sweden) Tommy Olsson	Maico																		8							3
34	(France) Patrick Boniface	Honda																					8				3
34	(Netherlands) Henk Bloemert	Husqvarna			9	10																					3
34	(United States) Frank Stacy	KTM																			10	9					3
41	(Finland) Timo Remes	Yamaha																		10							1
41	(Socialist Federal Republic of Yugoslavia) Marian Avbelj	KTM																								10	1

=== 125cc ===
(Results in italics indicate overall winner)

Pos	Rider	Machine	AUT (Austria)		GER (West Germany)		NED (Netherlands)		ITA (Italy)		FIN (Finland)		CZE (Czech Republic)		YUG (Socialist Federal Republic of Yugoslavia)		CH (Switzerland)		FRA (France)		IRL (Republic of Ireland)		USA (United States)		ESP (Spain)		Points
1	(Belgium) Harry Everts	Suzuki	1	1	1	1	1	1	2	3	1	1	1	1	2	1	1		1	1	1	1		3	1	1	314
2	(Japan) Akira Watanabe	Suzuki	3	2	2	2	2	2	1	1	2	2	4		1	2	2	8	2	4	2		5		2	2	236
3	(Belgium) Gaston Rahier	Yamaha	2				4		5		4	3	3	3	4	3	4	1	3	2	3	3	3	5	3	3	183
4	(Finland) Matti Autio	Suzuki			5	6	3	4	4	2	3	4	2	2	3			6		5	4	2					132
5	(Italy) Corrado Maddii	Aprilia		8					8	5	9	10	7	5		8	7	4	5	6	6	6			7	8	68
6	(Netherlands) Peter Groeneveld	Honda		7		8	6	3				6		9	7	6			10	7		4			5	6	62
7	(Italy) Mauro Miele	KTM	10	9	7	4							5	4		4	3	2		10						10	61
8	(Italy) Michele Rinaldi	TGM	9	6	9				7	4	7		6	6	5	5	6								8		55
9	(Belgium) Robert Greisch	Puch			10			9		10		9	8		8		5	3	4	3							46
10	(Finland) Göte Liljegren	Aprilia		5	6	5	10			8	8	8		8	10			9	9		9	10			6		43
11	(Soviet Union) Yuri Khudiakov	ČZ	7			3			10				9			7			6	9	7					5	38
11	(Netherlands) Dinand Ziljlstra	Kawasaki					5	5			5	7	10	7				10	7		8	8					38
13	(Soviet Union) Valéri Korneev	ČZ					8								9		8	5			5	5			9	9	30
14	(Italy) Renato Zocchi	Cagiva	8		3	7		10	6	6						10											29
15	(Finland) Pauli Piippola	Husqvarna								7				10					8	8	10				4	4	28
16	(United States) Mark Barnett	Suzuki																					2	1			27
16	(United States) Broc Glover	Yamaha																					1	2			27
16	(Czech Republic) Jiří Churavý	ČZ	4		4		7								6	9											27
19	(Austria) Siegfried Lerner	KTM	5	3				6																			21
20	(Italy) Dario Nani	Gilera	6			9			3																		17
21	(United States) Donnie Cantaloupi	Yamaha																					4	6			13
21	(United States) Brian Myerscough	Suzuki																					6	4			13
23	(Finland) Seppo Isomaki	Suzuki									6	5															11
24	(Italy) Franco Perfini	Gilera		4					9																		10
25	(United States) Tod Perkins	Yamaha																					8	7			7
25	(Denmark) Ole Svendson	KTM						7														9			10		7
27	(West Germany) Bernd Betzelbacher	Maico															9	7									6
27	(New Zealand) Graig Coleman	Suzuki								9												7					6
29	(Soviet Union) Andrei Ledovskoy	ČZ															10									7	5
29	(United States) Steve Martin	Yamaha																					9	8			5
31	(United States) Tom Benolkin	Suzuki																					7				4
31	(Belgium) Eddy Hau	Zündapp			8	10																					4
33	(Netherlands) Henk Pauw	Honda						8																			3
34	(United States) Randy Hess	Yamaha																						9			2
34	(Netherlands) Theunis Boersma	Suzuki					9																				2
36	(Czech Republic) Jaroslav Janis	ČZ		10																							1
36	(Finland) Arne Wilkman	Suzuki									10																1
36	(United States) Jeff Ward	Kawasaki																						10			1
36	(United States) Robert Handy	Suzuki																					10				1
