= Kees van der Ven =

Dutch motorcycle racer

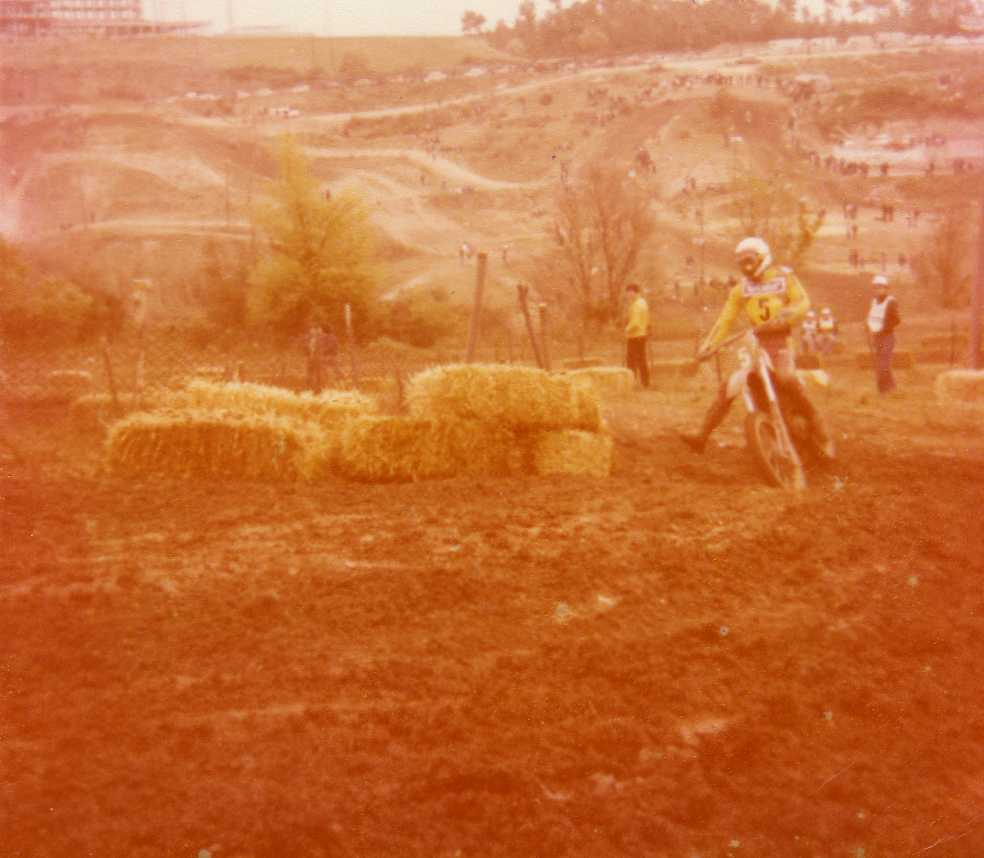
- Kees van der Ven in action during the 1980 250cc Spanish Motocross Grand Prix.
- Nationality: Dutch
- Born: 18 June 1957 (age 69) Bakel

Motocross career
- Years active: 1978 - 1991
- Teams: KTM
- Wins: 17

Kees van der Ven (born 18 June 1957) is a Dutch former professional motocross racer and racing team manager. He competed in the FIM Motocross World Championships from 1978 to 1991. Van der Ven was one of the most accomplished Dutch motocross racers of the 1980s, winning Grand Prix motocross races in the 125, 250 and 500cc displacement classes.

== Motocross racing career ==
=== Early career ===
Van der Ven was born in Bakel, Netherlands on 18 June 1957. At the age of 21, he scored in his first Motocross World Championship points at the 1978 250cc Austrian Grand Prix as a privateer aboard a Maico motorcycle. Van der Ven won the first overall victory of his career at the 1979 250cc Finnish Grand Prix where he finished ahead of Vladimir Kavinov (KTM) and three-time World Champion Gennady Moiseyev (KTM). He ended the 1979 season ranked fifth in the 250cc Motocross World Championship.

1980 marked the best result of Van der Ven's career when he finished second to Georges Jobé (Suzuki) in the 1980 250cc Motocross World Championship. Eight different competitors won Grand Prix events during the season, however none of them were able to score points consistently to challenge Jobé. Van der Ven won five heat races, two more than Jobé, however Jobé's consistent point scoring earned him the championship. Van der Ven's performance during the 1980 season earned him a place on the KTM factory racing team.

=== KTM factory team rider ===
Van der Ven won two Grand Prix events in the 1981 250cc Motocross World Championship, however the season was dominated by Jobé who had led the championship by 53 points over his closest rival, Neil Hudson (Yamaha) with four rounds remaining. Jobé appeared to be heading towards a second consecutive World Championship when he was injured while competing in a Belgian National Championship race, allowing Hudson to claim the title by 2 points over Jobé in second place while Van der Ven finished the season ranked third.

In the 1982 250cc Motocross World Championship, Van der Ven won three Grand Prix races as he battled with Jobé (Suzuki) and Danny LaPorte (Yamaha) for the championship points lead. He briefly leading the provisional standings after the first seven rounds of the season but then faltered at his home Grand Prix in the Netherlands as LaPorte then won three consecutive Grand Prix races to clinch the world championship ahead of Jobé in second place while Van der Ven finished the season ranked third. Jobé dominated the 1983 250cc Motocross World Championship ahead of LaPorte with Van der Ven taking third in the championship for a third consecutive time.

In 1984, Van der Ven switched to the 125 class and won three of the first five Grand Prix events to take the championship points lead until he injured his hand at the sixth round in Switzerland. Michele Rinaldi (Suzuki) then won five of the last seven Grand Prix events to clinch the World Championship ahead of Corrado Maddii (Cagiva) as Van der Ven finished the season in third place. He was ranked fourth in the 1985 125cc Motocross World Championship despite not participating in the final two rounds in Argentina and Brazil. At the 1985 Motocross des Nations event held in Gaildorf, West Germany, Van der Ven was the second highest 500cc individual points scorer behind David Thorpe to help the Dutch team finish in second place behind the American team.

Van der Ven moved up to the premier 500cc class for the 1986 season. The 500cc Motocross World Championships featured one of the most talented field of competitors of the 1980s. Van der Ven was challenged by the powerful Honda factory team of David Thorpe, André Malherbe and Eric Geboers as well as Yamaha's Håkan Carlqvist and the 1983 250cc World Champion Georges Jobé riding for the Kawasaki factory racing team. Although the Honda team dominated the season, Van der Ven won the 1986 500cc Swedish Grand Prix and finished the season ranked fifth in the world championship.

Thorpe began the 1987 500cc Motocross World Championship season with three consecutive victories in the Spanish, French and Austrian Grands Prix to take the championship points lead, however he then suffered an injury while competing in the British National Championship. Van der Ven was challenging Jobé {Honda) for the championship points lead until an injury forced him to miss two rounds. He finished the season strongly by winning the final two Grand Prix races of the year to place third in the final points standings behind Jobé and second place Kurt Nicoll (KTM). At the 1987 Motocross des Nations event held in Unadilla, New York, Van der Ven was the highest 500cc individual points scorer as the Dutch team once again finished in second place behind the American team.

Van der Ven's victory at the 1989 500cc Swedish Grand Prix marked the final win of his motocross racing career. He competed in his final World Championship race at the 1992 500cc Dutch Grand Prix at the age of 35.

== Career overview ==
Van der Ven won 33 individual heat races (9-125cc, 17-250cc, 7-500cc) and 18 Grand Prix victories (4-125cc, 10-250cc, 4-500cc) during his world championship racing career. Although he never won a World Championship, he was the 1980 250cc Vice Champion and was a ten-time Dutch Motocross National Champion (250cc: 1978-1983, 500cc: 1985-1986, 1988, 1990). Van der Ven was a member of ten Dutch Motocross des Nations teams (1978-1982, 1984-1985, 1987-1988, 1990) and seven Trophée des Nations teams (1978-1984).

Van der Ven also competed in enduro events and was a member of the winning Dutch team at the 1984 International Six Days Enduro. A specialist on sand tracks, he won five consecutive times at the Le Touquet beach race between 1982 and 1986.

== Later life ==
After his riding career ended, Van der Ven became a successful team manager for KTM, winning 125cc world championships with Grant Langston (2000) Steve Ramon (2003) and Ben Townley (2004).

== Motocross Grand Prix Results ==
Points system from 1969 to 1980:

Position	1	2	3	4	5	6	7	8	9	10
Points	15	12	10	8	6	5	4	3	2	1

Points system from 1984:

Position	1st	2nd	3rd	4th	5th	6th	7th	8th	9th	10th	11th	12th	13th	14th	15th
Points	20	17	15	13	11	10	9	8	7	6	5	4	3	2	1

Year	Class	Team	1		2		3		4		5		6		7		8		9		10		11		12		Pos	Pts
Year	Class	Team	R1	R2	R1	R2	R1	R2	R1	R2	R1	R2	R1	R2	R1	R2	R1	R2	R1	R2	R1	R2	R1	R2	R1	R2	Pos	Pts
1978	250cc	Maico	ESP -	ESP -	ITA -	ITA -	CZE -	CZE -	YUG -	YUG -	AUT; 6	AUT; 10	GER -	GER -	UK -	UK -	FRA -	FRA -	USA -	USA -	SWE -	SWE -	FIN -	FIN -	USR -	USR -	26th	6
1979	250cc	Maico	ESP -	ESP -	NED; 5	NED; 2	ITA -	ITA -	BEL; 5	BEL -	YUG -	YUG -	CZE -	CZE; 9	POL; 2	POL; 8	FRA; 10	FRA; 7	FIN; 1	FIN; 3	USA; 8	USA; 5	GER; 5	GER; 3	BUL; 7	BUL; 5	5th	106
1980	250cc	Maico	ESP -	ESP -	CZE; 8	CZE -	GER -	GER; 8	BEL; 10	BEL -	POL; 1	POL; 4	USR -	USR -	UK; 1	UK -	FRA -	FRA; 2	NED; 1	NED; 1	USA; 5	USA; 4	FIN; 1	FIN; 2	SWE; 7	SWE -	2nd	132
1981	250cc	KTM	FRA; 8	FRA; 1	ESP; 9	ESP; 3	AUT; 7	AUT; 3	ITA -	ITA -	CZE; 3	CZE; 3	BUL -	BUL; 5	CH; 8	CH; 9	UK; 1	UK; 2	GER; 10	GER; 5	USA; 3	USA; 3	USR -	USR -	NED; 1	NED; 1	3rd	159
1982	250cc	KTM	CH; 5	CH; 7	ESP; 8	ESP; 3	BEL; 3	BEL; 5	CZE; 6	CZE -	ITA; 2	ITA; 1	FRA; 6	FRA; 1	UK; 1	UK; 2	NED; 5	NED; 3	USR; 5	USR; 6	USA; 3	USA; 1	FIN; 3	FIN; 1	SWE; 3	SWE -	3rd	205
1983	250cc	KTM	ESP; 3	ESP -	FRA -	FRA -	ITA -	ITA -	NED -	NED; 3	BUL; 9	BUL; 8	GER -	GER -	UK; 3	UK; 3	CAN; 1	CAN; 1	USA; 7	USA; 7	CH; 4	CH; 6	SWE -	SWE; 6	FIN; 3	FIN; 5	3rd	117
1984	125cc	KTM	ITA; 1	ITA; 1	NED; 1	NED -	BEL; 1	BEL; 1	AUT; 1	AUT; 9	GER; 1	GER; 2	CH; 4	CH -	SM -	SM -	FRA; 7	FRA; 3	ESP; 7	ESP; 6	SWE -	SWE; 1	FIN -	FIN -	LUX; 3	LUX; 11	3rd	255
1985	125cc	KTM	NED; 9	NED; 3	ITA; 9	ITA; 3	BEL; 10	BEL; 6	FRA; 9	FRA; 5	YUG; 6	YUG -	CZE; 2	CZE; 8	SM -	SM; 7	GER; 2	GER; 1	FIN; 3	FIN; 3	POR; 5	POR; 3	ARG -	ARG -	BRA -	BRA -	4th	215
1986	500cc	KTM	CH -	CH -	AUT; 5	AUT; 7	NED; 13	NED; 5	SWE; 3	SWE; 1	FIN; 5	FIN; 5	GER; 3	GER; 6	CAN; 6	CAN; 5	USA -	USA; 11	FRA; 4	FRA; 9	UK; 4	UK; 3	BEL; 10	BEL; 8	LUX -	LUX; 9	5th	211
1987	500cc	KTM	ESP; 3	ESP; 15	FRA; 7	FRA; 15	AUT -	AUT; 2	FIN; 2	FIN; 2	SWE; 2	SWE; 4	GER; 6	GER; 4	ITA -	ITA -	UK -	UK -	NED -	NED; 8	BEL; 5	BEL; 2	LUX; 1	LUX; 2	CH; 1	CH; 1	3rd	243
1988	500cc	KTM	AUT; 13	AUT; 10	CH; 7	CH; 2	SWE; 9	SWE; 4	FIN -	FIN; 2	GER; 7	GER -	ITA; 8	ITA; 12	USA; 5	USA; 11	UK; 3	UK; 3	NED; 7	NED; 1	SM; 12	SM; 5	BEL; 11	BEL; 2	LUX; 9	LUX -	4th	212
1989	500cc	KTM	NED; 4	NED; 5	FRA -	FRA -	AUT; 11	AUT; 4	ITA; 10	ITA; 10	FIN; 1	FIN; 6	SWE; 1	SWE; 2	USA; 5	USA; 10	SM; 4	SM; 4	UK -	UK -	BEL -	BEL -	LUX -	LUX -	SWE -	SWE -	8th	164
1990	500cc	KTM	NED; 8	NED; 3	CH -	CH -	AUT; 8	AUT -	FRA -	FRA -	FIN; 7	FIN; 4	ITA; 9	ITA; 6	UK; 8	UK; 8	GER; 14	GER; 5	SM -	SM; 11	BEL; 3	BEL; 3	LUX -	LUX; 10	USA; 7	USA -	7th	149
1991	500cc	KTM	CH -	CH -	AUT -	AUT -	FIN; 14	FIN; 10	SWE; 15	SWE; 9	FRA -	FRA -	NED; 11	NED; 5	ITA -	ITA; 14	UK; 4	UK; 6	GER; 10	GER; 7	BEL -	BEL; 6	LUX -	LUX -	USA -	USA -	13th	82

Year	Class	Team	1			2			3			4			5			6			7			8			9			10			11			12			Pos	Pts
Year	Class	Team	R1	R2	R3	R1	R2	R3	R1	R2	R3	R1	R2	R3	R1	R2	R3	R1	R2	R3	R1	R2	R3	R1	R2	R3	R1	R2	R3	R1	R2	R3	R1	R2	R3	R1	R2	R3	Pos	Pts
1992	500cc	KTM	USA -	USA -	USA -	CZE -	CZE -	CZE -	AUT -	AUT -	AUT -	FIN -	FIN -	FIN -	SM -	SM -	SM -	GER -	GER -	GER; 10	UK; 15	UK; 13	UK -	FRA -	FRA -	FRA -	NED; 10	NED -	NED -	BEL -	BEL -	BEL -	LUX -	LUX -	LUX -	CH -	CH -	CH -	32nd	16
