= Corrado Maddii =

Italian motorcycle racer

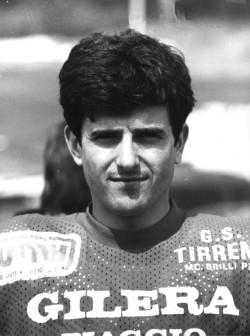
- Nationality: Italian
- Born: 28 March 1957 (age 69) Levane, Italy

Motocross career
- Years active: 1973 - 1990
- Teams: Moto Gori; Aspes; Beta; Aprilia; Gilera; Cagiva; Kawasaki; Honda; Husqvarna
- Championships: 0 (twice 2nd and once 3rd)
- Wins: 5

Corrado Maddii (born 28 March 1957) is an Italian former professional motocross racer and current motocross team manager. He competed in the Motocross World Championships from 1976 to 1990. Maddii was a two-time vice world champion in the 125cc class.

== Motorcycle racing career ==
Maddii was born in Levane in the province of Arezzo. He began competing in motocross racing in 1973, and by 1976, had advanced to the motocross world championships riding a Moto Aspes. Maddii joined the Aprilia factory racing team in 1979 and finished fifth in the 125cc world championship. After three years with the Aprilia team, he switched to ride for the Gilera factory racing team in 1980 and finished second to Eric Geboers in the 125cc world championship.

After only one season with Gilera, Maddii joined the Cagiva factory racing team in 1981. In 1984, Maddii had accumulated a sizable lead in the 125cc world championship points standings going into the final race of the season however, he suffered a broken leg in practice allowing Michele Rinaldi to claim the world championship by just 3 points as, Maddii was once again relegated to vice champion.

Year	Motorcycle	World Championship				
Year	Motorcycle	125cc	250cc	500cc	GP wins	Races wins
1976	Aspes	14			0	
1977	Aspes	14			0	
1978	Beta	10			0	
1979	Aprilia	5			0	
1980	Aprilia	14				
1981	Aprilia	8				
1982	Gilera	2				
1983	Cagiva	5				
1984	Cagiva	2				
1985	Cagiva	3				
1986	Kawasaki			11	0	0
1987	Honda	4			0	
1988	Honda	7			0	
1989	Honda	27			0	
1990	Husqvarna	25			0	
Total					0	
