= Mike Bell (motorcyclist) =

American motorcycle racer (1957–2021)

- Nationality: American
- Born: August 8, 1957 Los Angeles, California, U.S.
- Died: 25 January 2021 (aged 63)

Motocross career
- Years active: 1976 - 1983
- Teams: Yamaha
- Championships: AMA 250SX - 1980
- Wins: 20

Michael R. Bell (August 8, 1957 – January 25, 2021) was an American professional motocross and mountain bike racer. He competed in the AMA Motocross Championships from 1976 to 1983. Bell was a member of the Yamaha factory racing team for his entire motocross career, winning the AMA Supercross Championship in 1980. He won 20 AMA and Trans-AMA events during his career.

In 1983, Bell's motocross career ended due to injuries, especially knee problems.

While coming back from knee surgery, Bell took up bicycling to rebuild strength. He went on to be a competitive mountain bike racer.

Bell was inducted into the AMA Hall of Fame in 2001.

Bell died of a heart attack while mountain biking near his home.
