= Chuck Sun =

American motorcycle racer

- Nationality: (United States) American
- Born: September 10, 1956 (age 70) Sherwood, Oregon, U.S.

Motocross career
- Years active: 1976 - 1983
- Teams: Honda
- Championships: AMA 500cc - 1980
- Wins: 7

Chuck Sun (born September 10, 1956) is an American former professional motocross racer. He competed in the AMA Motocross Championships from 1976 to 1983. In 1980, Sun won the AMA 500cc motocross national championship. He is the only Asian American to have won a national championship in American professional motorcycle racing. In 2003, Sun was inducted into the AMA Motorcycle Hall of Fame.

== Early life ==
Born in Sherwood, Oregon, Sun comes from an off-road riding family out of rural Sherwood, Oregon. Earnings of $100 from picking beans and strawberries under Oregon's summer sun in 1968, 12-year-old Chuck Sun bought his first dirt bike. Sun's dad Roger just asked one time “Are you sure this is what you want to spend your money on?” No question it was that Cat mini bike at the auto parts store. Bruce Brown's movie “On Any Sunday” made Malcolm Smith an icon in off-road motorcycle racing and would ignite in Chuck an indistinguishable passion for racing. At the age of 14, Sun entered his first motocross race and fell trying to pass everyone in the first turn.

== Career Racing Highlights ==
- #1 NW Motocross Series
- 1978 National Trans-USA 250 Champion Husqvarna Motorcycles
- 1979 United States Grand Prix Top American Podium with a 3rd place
- 1980 National Motocross Champion American Honda
- 1981 United States Supercross Stadium Championship 3rd Overall
- 1981 Champion USGP Carlsbad, CA ABC Sports televised event
- Member of First U.S. Team in History to win the Motocross des Nations with teammates Donny Hansen, Johnny O’Mara & Danny LaPorte.
- Class of 2003 Inducted into the AMA Hall of Fame
- 2003 Qualified for AMA Supermoto Las Vegas Final
- Represented in the History of America Motocross Museum -Pickerington, OH
- Phitsanoluk, Thailand Maxxis Asia Open Top American 4th Overall Pro
