= Dalečín =

- Municipality
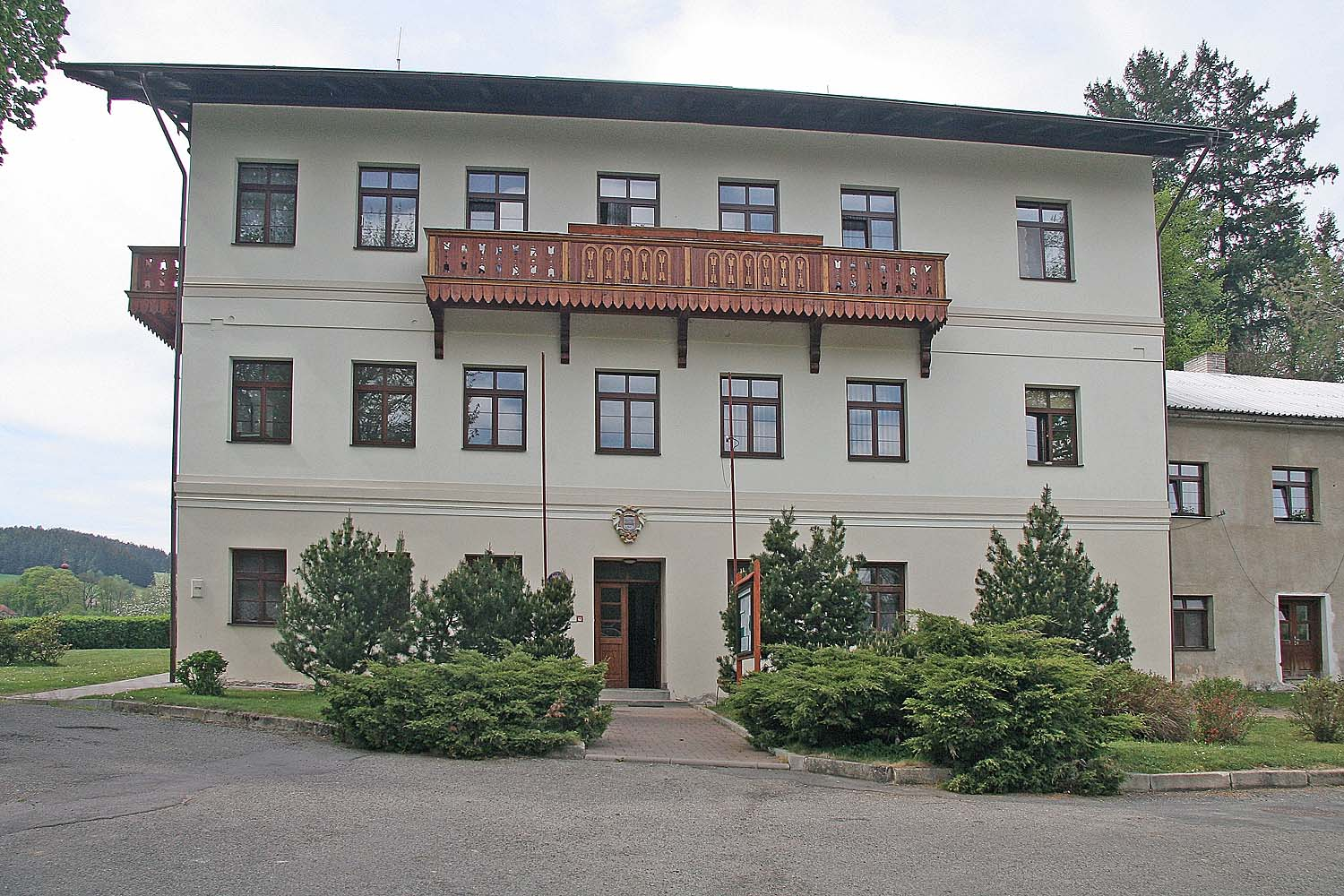
- Former castle, now municipal office

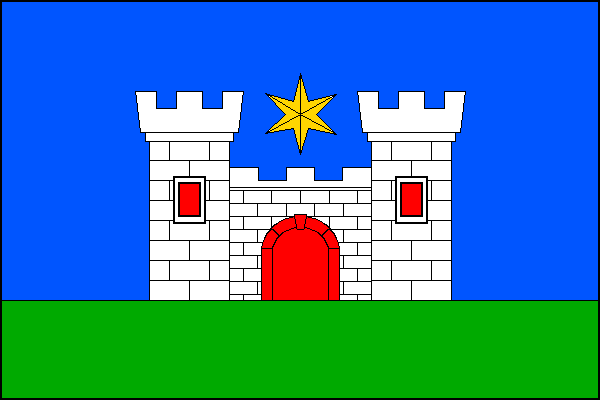
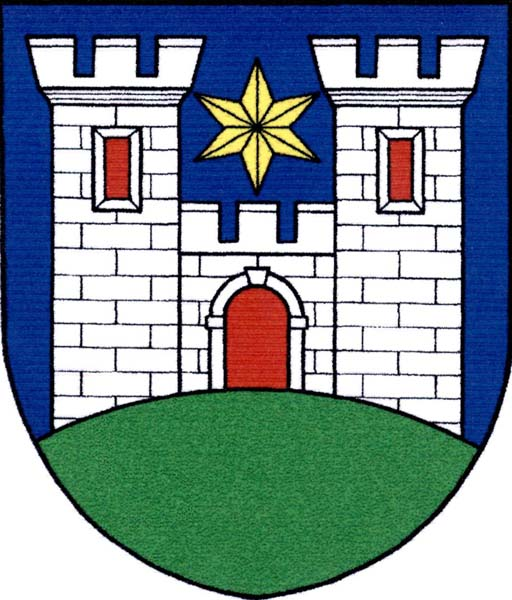
- Flag Coat of arms

- Location in the Czech Republic
- Coordinates: 49°35′29″N 16°14′24″E
- Country: Czech Republic
- Region: Vysočina
- District: Žďár nad Sázavou
- First mentioned: 1349

Area
  - Total: 16.29 km^{2} (6.29 sq mi)
- Elevation: 472 m (1,549 ft)

Population (2026-01-01)
  - Total: 659
  - Density: 40.5/km^{2} (105/sq mi)
- Time zone: UTC+1 (CET)
  - Summer (DST): UTC+2 (CEST)
- Postal codes: 592 41, 592 65
- Website: www.dalecin.cz

Dalečín is a municipality and village in Žďár nad Sázavou District in the Vysočina Region of the Czech Republic. It has about 700 inhabitants.

== Administrative division ==
Dalečín consists of three municipal parts (in brackets population according to the 2021 census):

- Dalečín (526)
- Hluboké (38)
- Veselí (77)

== Etymology ==
The name is probably derived from personal name Daleca.

== Geography ==
Dalečín is located about 22 kilometres (14 mi) east of Žďár nad Sázavou and 48 km (30 mi) northwest of Brno. It lies in the Upper Svratka Highlands. The highest point is the hill Na Jedli at 728 m (2,388 ft) above sea level. The village of Dalečín is located in a meander of the Svratka River.

Part of the Vír Reservoir is located in the municipal territory. The reservoir was built in 1947–1958 and includes the area of the village of Chudobín, which was flooded during the construction of the reservoir.

== History ==
The first mention of Dalečín from 1086, where it is referred to as Daletice, is considered forgery. The first reliable reference is from 1349. A castle and the Church of Saint James the Great are first mentioned in a deed from 1353. In 1390, a fortress in Dalečín is mentioned.

From 1353 until 1588, Dalečín was owned by the Pernštejn family. In 1588, Jan of Pernštejn sold the village to Pavel Katharyn of Kathar. In the following years, Dalečín often changed owners. After the Battle of White Mountain, the Dalečín estate was confiscated to Vilém Dubský of Třebomyslice and sold to and Štěpán Schmidt of Freihofen. Dalečín became part of the Kunštát estate and remained part of it until the abolition of manorialism in 1848. The last owner was the free lord Honrichs.

== Demographics ==
Historical population

Year	Pop.	±%
1869	1,065	—
1880	1,099	+3.2%
1890	1,102	+0.3%
1900	1,074	−2.5%
1910	1,013	−5.7%

Year	Pop.	±%
1921	984	−2.9%
1930	937	−4.8%
1950	772	−17.6%
1961	827	+7.1%
1970	813	−1.7%

Year	Pop.	±%
1980	799	−1.7%
1991	775	−3.0%
2001	723	−6.7%
2011	630	−12.9%
2021	641	+1.7%

Source: Censuses

== Transport ==
There are no railways or major roads passing through the municipality.

== Sights ==
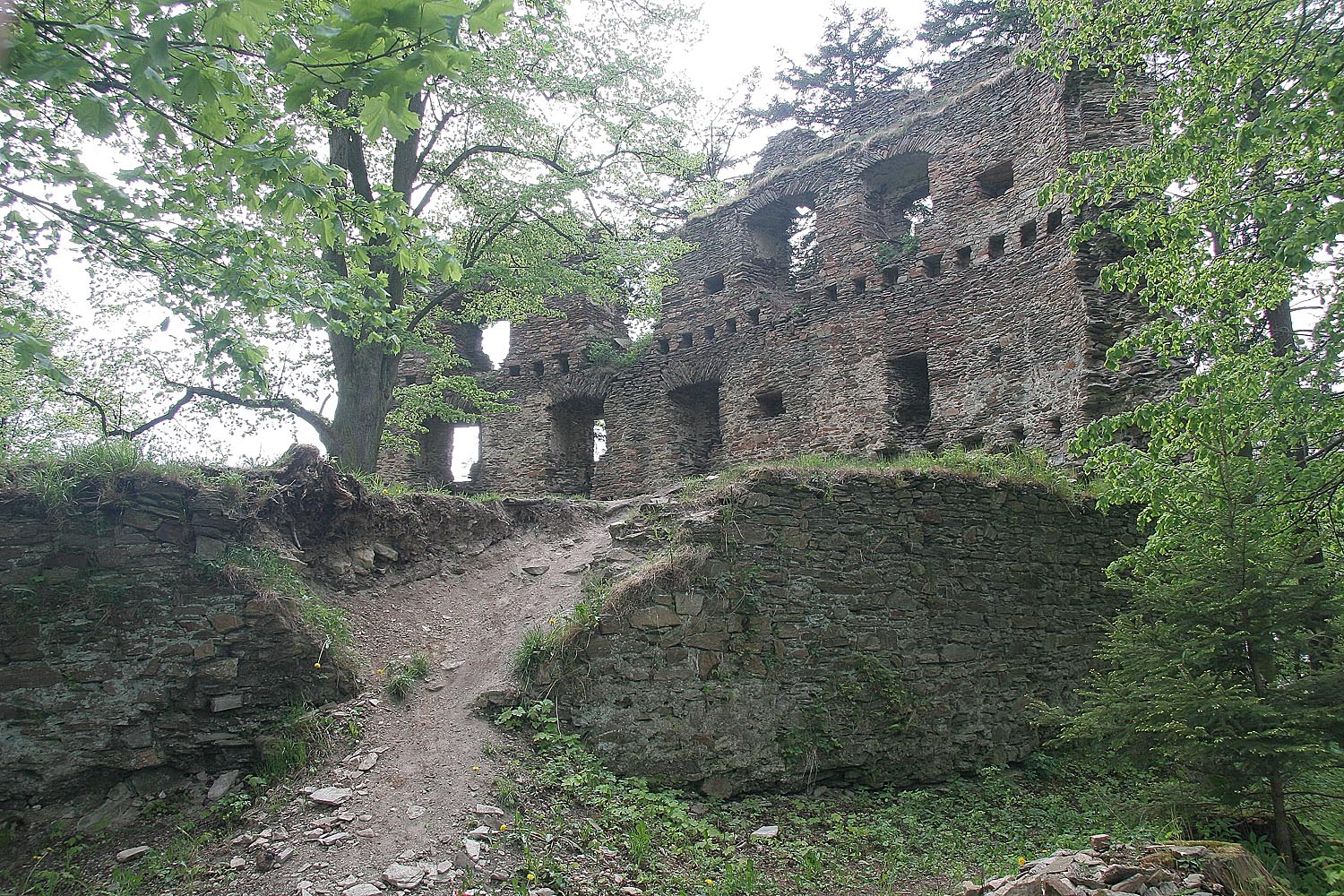
Dalečín Castle

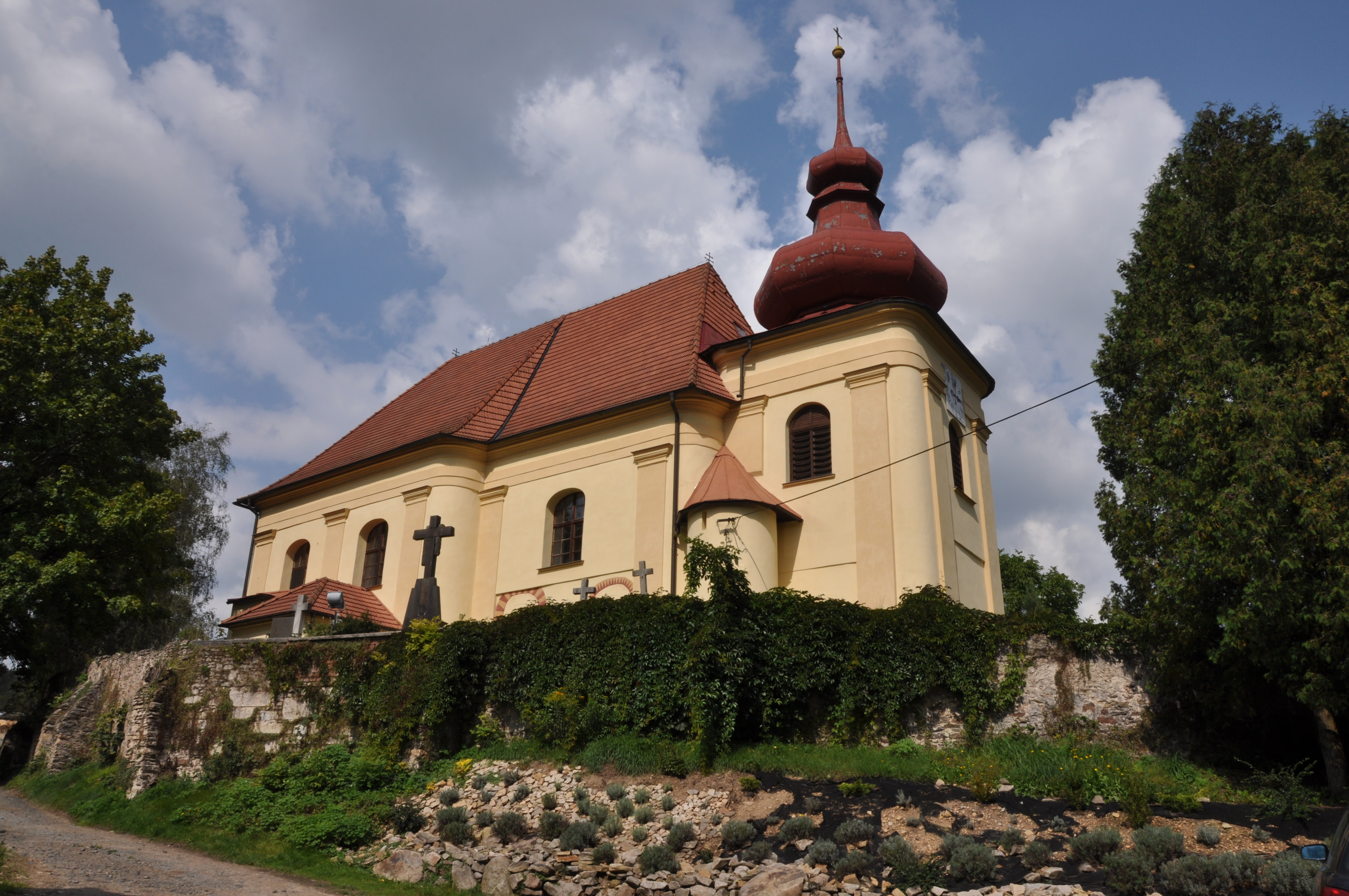
Church of Saint James the Great

Dalečín Castle is situated in the meander of the Svratka which protected it from three sides. Based on the architectural elements of the castle, it was built around 1340. The first written mention of the castle is from 1358 when it was passed to the Pernštejn family. Since the beginning of the 16th century the castle was probably a seat of robber knights. In 1519 the castle was devastated by an army. Since then, the castle is listed as desolate.

The Dalečín Castle was built around 1590 by Pavel Katharyn of Kathar close to the deserted Dalečín Castle. The Renaissance castle had a number of owners and at the end of 19th century it was rebuilt in the style of Tyrol cottage. The last owner from nobility was young countess Františka Coudenhove-Honrichs. In the 1919 land reform the castle was confiscated by the state. However, the castle and the castle were returned to Františka Coudenhove-Honrichs in 1924. She donated the castle to Congregation of the Consolatory Sisters of the Jesus Divine Heart. In the early 1950s, it was again confiscated by the state. The castle nowadays houses the municipal office.

The Church of Saint James the Great was built in 1358. In 1744, it was rebuilt in the Baroque style.

The Villa of Gustav Jarošek is an architecturally valuable house in the Functionalist style built in 1936–1939.
