= Danny LaPorte =

American motorcycle racer

- Born: December 3, 1956 (age 69) Los Angeles, California, U.S.

Motocross career
- Years active: 1973–1985
- Teams: Suzuki, Honda, Yamaha, Husqvarna
- Championships: 250cc – 1982; 500cc – AMA 1979
- Wins: 8 AMA, 6 FIM

Danny LaPorte (born December 3, 1956) is an American former professional motocross racer. He was one of the top motocross racers in the 1970s and 1980s and, was the first American to win a 250cc motocross world championship.

== Biography ==
Born in Los Angeles, California, LaPorte began riding in the early 1970s when the sport of motocross enjoyed a period of explosive growth. He began racing professionally when he turned 16 and by 1976 he was offered a job with the Suzuki factory racing team. In 1979, LaPorte won the AMA 500cc national championship for Suzuki. He was part of the victorious American Motocross des Nations team in 1981, marking the first time an American team had won the prestigious event.

Seeking new challenges, LaPorte decided to compete in the 1982 250cc Motocross World Championship riding for the Yamaha factory racing team managed by former racer Heikki Mikkola. 1980 250cc World Champion Georges Jobé (Suzuki) was heavily favored to win the title and was leading the championship at mid-season when he suffered an elbow fracture during the 250cc French Grand Prix. LaPorte then won three consecutive Grand Prix races to take the championship points lead from Jobé. The championship would not be decided until the last race of the season in Sweden where LaPorte finished ahead of Jobé to claim the World Championship by 13 points. Jobé began the 1983 250cc Motocross World Championship by winning five of the first six heat races to build a commanding 60-point lead. He then posted consistent results to maintain his points lead and clinch the title over LaPorte with two rounds remaining.

Returning to America, LaPorte began to compete in desert racing and won the famous Baja 1000 three times as a member of the Kawasaki racing team. In the 1990s, he competed in international rally events, winning a stage and finishing second overall in the 1992 Paris-Dakar Rally. He also is the winner of 1991 Pharaohs rally in Egypt.

LaPorte currently resides in Southern California and still competes occasionally. In 2000, he was inducted into the AMA Motorcycle Hall of Fame. He was inducted again in 2003, this time as a member of the victorious 1981 Motocross des Nations team.
