= Neil Hudson (motorcyclist) =

British motorcycle rider (born 1957)

- Nationality: British
- Born: 24 January 1957 (age 69) Pensford, Somerset, England

Motocross career
- Years active: 1977 - 1983
- Teams: Maico, Yamaha
- Championships: 250cc - 1981
- Wins: 7

Neil Hudson (born 24 January 1957) is an English former professional motocross racer. He competed in the FIM Motocross World Championships from 1977 to 1983. Hudson is notable for winning the 1981 250cc Motocross World Championship.

== Biography ==
Hudson was born in Pensford, Somerset on 24 January 1957. He began to compete in the British Schoolboy motocross championships riding a 125cc BSA motorcycle. At the age of 20, he scored in his first Motocross World Championship points at the 1977 250cc Swiss Grand Prix with sponsorship provided by the UK importer for Maico motorcycles. Hudson earned a place on the British Motocross des Nations team in 1977 where he helped the team secure a third place. One week later at the Trophée des Nations team event for 250cc motorcycles, he helped the British team secure another third-place result.

Hudson won the first overall victory of his career at the 1978 250cc Swedish Grand Prix and ended the season ranked fifth in the 250 class. In 1979, Hudson challenged Håkan Carlqvist (Husqvarna) for the 250 championship points lead until midseason when his Maico experienced numerous mechanical failures allowing Carlquist to win the 250 World Championship over second-placed Hudson. At the 1979 Motocross des Nations, Hudson scored a sixth and fourth place results to help the British team finish the event in second place behind the powerful Belgian team led by five-time World Champion Roger De Coster (Suzuki) and André Malherbe (Honda).

Disappointed with his Maico's performance, Hudson signed a contract to race for the Yamaha team in 1980 however, the Maico factory took him to court to prevent his departure and he returned to race for the Maico team. After winning the first heat race at the 1980 250cc West German Grand Prix, he broke his leg in the next heat race and was forced to miss the rest of the season.

Hudson left the Maico team at the end of his contract and in 1981, he signed to race for the Yamaha factory team managed by former World Champion, Heikki Mikkola. In the 1981 250cc Motocross World Championship, Georges Jobé (Suzuki) won five of the first seven Grand Prix races to lead by 53 points over Hudson in second place with four rounds remaining and appeared to be heading towards a second consecutive World Championship when he was injured while competing in a Belgian National Championship race. Jobé attempted to compete in the penultimate round in Russia but was injured again, allowing Hudson to overtake him and win the World Championship by only two points in the final standings. He was the first British rider to win a 250cc Motocross World Championship.

Hudson moved up to the premier 500cc class in 1982 and, was tied with Brad Lackey for the championship lead after the first four rounds but, finished the season in third place behind Lackey (Suzuki) and André Vromans (Suzuki). After a disappointing 1983 season in the 500cc world championship, Hudson retired from professional motocross competition at the age of 25. He competed in his final World Championship race at the 1983 500cc San Marino Grand Prix.

== Career overview ==
Hudson won 11 individual heat races and seven Grand Prix victories during his world championship racing career. He won a 250cc World Championship (1981) and one 500cc British Motocross Championship (1982). Hudson was a member of five British Motocross des Nations teams (1976-1979, 1982) and seven Trophée des Nations teams (1976-1982).

== Motocross Grand Prix Results ==
Points system from 1969 to 1983:

Position	1	2	3	4	5	6	7	8	9	10
Points	15	12	10	8	6	5	4	3	2	1

Year	Class	Team	1		2		3		4		5		6		7		8		9		10		11		12		Pos	Pts
Year	Class	Team	R1	R2	R1	R2	R1	R2	R1	R2	R1	R2	R1	R2	R1	R2	R1	R2	R1	R2	R1	R2	R1	R2	R1	R2	Pos	Pts
1977	250cc	Maico	ESP -	ESP -	CH; 7	CH -	BEL; 7	BEL; 7	CZE; 8	CZE -	ITA; 8	ITA -	AUT; 9	AUT -	USR; 7	USR; 9	YUG; 5	YUG -	GER -	GER; 7	UK; 9	UK; 9	SWE; 8	SWE; 4	FIN -	FIN -	13th	51
1978	250cc	Maico	ESP; 4	ESP -	ITA -	ITA -	CZE; 7	CZE; 4	YUG; 6	YUG; 5	AUT; 9	AUT; 3	GER; 3	GER; 5	UK; 3	UK; 3	FRA; 2	FRA; 5	USA; 7	USA; 10	SWE; 4	SWE; 2	FIN; 5	FIN -	USR; 9	USR -	5th	130
1979	250cc	Maico	ESP; 5	ESP; 3	NED; 4	NED; 5	ITA; 1	ITA; 4	BEL; 1	BEL; 2	YUG; 2	YUG; 1	CZE; 2	CZE -	POL; 3	POL -	FRA -	FRA; 3	FIN -	FIN; 1	USA -	USA -	GER; 2	GER; 2	BUL -	BUL -	2nd	178
1980	250cc	Maico	ESP -	ESP -	CZE; 3	CZE; 5	GER; 1	GER -	BEL -	BEL -	POL -	POL -	USR -	USR -	UK -	UK -	FRA -	FRA -	NED -	NED -	USA; 9	USA -	FIN -	FIN -	SWE -	SWE -	18th	33
1981	250cc	Yamaha	FRA -	FRA -	ESP -	ESP; 2	AUT; 1	AUT; 2	ITA -	ITA; 2	CZE; 2	CZE; 2	BUL; 1	BUL; 2	CH; 2	CH; 2	UK; 3	UK; 1	GER; 6	GER; 2	USA; 2	USA; 2	USR; 1	USR; 1	NED; 4	NED; 6	1st	235
1982	500cc	Yamaha	FRA; 4	FRA; 4	NED -	NED; 7	SWE; 2	SWE; 4	FIN; 5	FIN; 1	AUT; 5	AUT; 6	ITA; 6	ITA; 3	GER; 4	GER; 4	USA; 7	USA; 7	CAN; 4	CAN; 4	UK; 6	UK; 4	BEL; 4	BEL; 8	LUX; 4	LUX -	3rd	159
1983	500cc	Yamaha	CH -	CH; 5	AUT; 6	AUT; 8	GER; 6	GER -	SWE -	SWE -	FIN; 9	FIN -	ITA; 9	ITA -	USA -	USA -	FRA; 6	FRA -	UK; 9	UK -	BEL -	BEL -	SM -	SM; 8	NED -	NED -	14th	33
