= Hawkstone Park Motocross Circuit =

Motocross Circuit in Hawkstone Park

Coordinates: 52°50′28.21″N 2°37′33.38″W

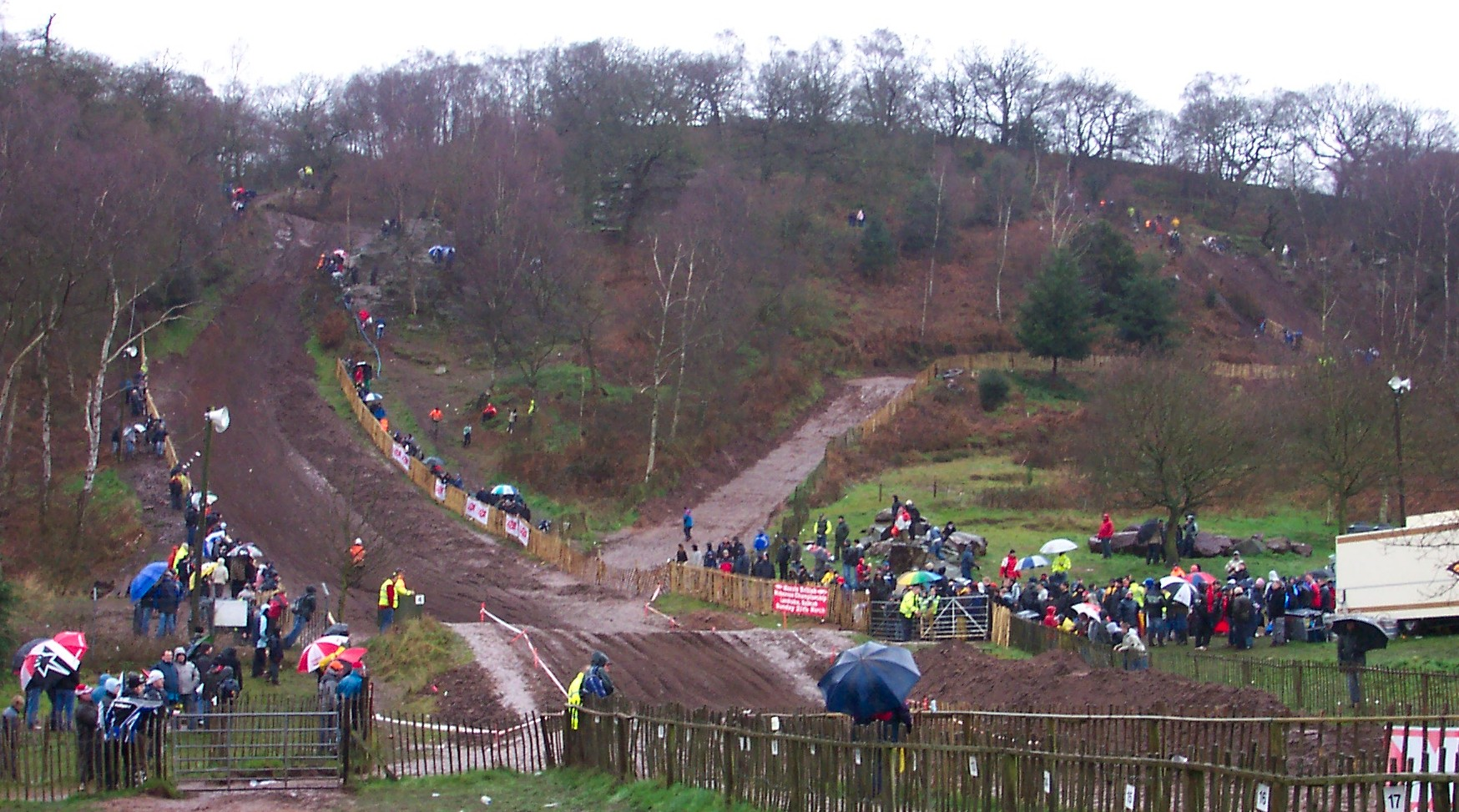
Hawkstone Hill

Hawkstone Park Motocross Circuit, typically referred to as Hawkstone Park or Hawkstone, is a motocross circuit situated near Market Drayton, north Shropshire, England. The circuit has hosted many grand prix and international events from the 1950s to the present day.

== The Circuit ==
The Hawkstone circuit is approximately 1.8 miles (2.9 km) long (although the layout can be shortened for youth or clubman events if required). It is known for its track surface, which consists of deep, loamy sand. During the course of a race meeting, the circuit becomes very rough and bumpy, testing the skill of riders. The centrepiece of the circuit is the 'Hawkstone Hill', a steep hill that eventually rises to a 1-in-3 ascent at the top of the hill. The crest of the hill can be seen from the A53 road (Shrewsbury to Market Drayton) several miles away. At the top of the hill, riders have to contend with a hard sandstone surface, before dropping back down the hill in a steep descent, beginning in an 8-foot (2 m) almost vertical drop, followed by a bumpy descent that tests riders' skill and bike control. Other famous obstacles include the 'whoop' section, a series of large man-made bumps that require a great deal of skill and courage from riders in order to tackle them at speed. A fall in this section is usually heavy and spectacular. (3 times World Motocross Champion David Thorpe crashed spectacularly here in front of TV cameras at the 1986 500cc British Motocross Grand Prix).

There is also a Race control area including a commentary tower, offices, scrutineering area and press room, a first aid building, toilets and shower area for riders, and a large paddock and car park area.

== Early history ==
The site used for motocross events first held a motorsport event in 1938, a hill climb event, staged by the 'Crewe and Nantwich Light Car Club'. The event used the Hawkstone Hill, the winner being the driver who was able to get the furthest up the hill. These early events were soon halted by the advent of World War II, but soon after the end of the war, motocross (or scrambling as was known) made its debut at Hawkstone Park. The event was held by the Salop Motor Club, who still organise events at Hawkstone Park, and manages the motocross circuit to this day. Qualification for the motocross races was determined in a similar fashion to the hill climb events, the riders who made it the furthest up the hill qualified for the race.

== 1950s & 1960s ==
From there, the circuit moved onto greater heights, in 1951 the first national level meeting was held, and in 1954, the circuit staged a round of the FIM European Motocross Championship. 33,000 spectators witnessed British rider Phil Nex take the victory.

1960 saw one of the largest crowds in Hawkstone Park's history, for the Brian Stonebridge Memorial Trophy (in memory of 1950s rider Brian Stonebridge who died in a motoring accident). 54,000 spectators attended the event, with buses being laid on from nearby towns such as Shrewsbury for spectators.

Grand Prix events continued at the circuit until 1965, by which time, the dusty conditions had deemed the circuit too dangerous for top-level motocross competition. British rider Jeff Smith won the final 500cc Grand Prix of the decade in 1965, aboard his BSA.

The 1950s and 1960s were arguably the hey-day for Hawkstone Park. Thanks to coverage from the BBC Grandstand program (which incidentally included Murray Walker as commentator), "Scrambling" was quite popular with the general public, and major events at Hawkstone regularly saw five-figure crowds in attendance.

== 1970s & 1980s ==
Grand Prix Motocross returned to Hawkstone in 1975, where Suzuki rider Gerrit Wolsink took victory. However, riders in the 500cc voiced their disapproval with the dusty conditions, and so in 1976, a Grand Prix was staged for 125cc machines, in the inaugural FIM 125cc Motocross World Championship, Belgian Gaston Rahier took victory.

The circuit then hosted a series of successful 250cc Grand Prix events in the late 1970s and early 1980s, and the Salop Motor Club also introduced the popular "New Year's Day" event during this period. The New Year's Day event was staged on January 1, each year until 1999, and saw British Motocross Championship riders, along clubmen and youth riders tackle a shortened version of the Hawkstone circuit.

In 1984, 500cc Grand Prix events once again returned to Hawkstone Park, where Belgian Georges Jobé famously jumped over rival André Malherbe during the second Grand Prix race. The overall winner was British rider David Thorpe, who finished highly in the 1986 Grand Prix despite a heavy fall, before taking another popular victory in the 1988 Grand Prix.

In 1989, a whole new generation of riders competed at Hawkstone, as the circuit staged its final 125cc Grand Prix. The overall winner was American Trampas Parker, whilst hidden away with the back-markers was Belgian newcomer Stefan Everts, who later went on to dominate Grand Prix motocross.

== 1990s ==
Hawkstone Park had alternated as the venue for the 500cc British Grand Prix with Farleigh Castle circuit in Wiltshire during the 1980s, but from 1990, the circuit was used permanently. Unfortunately, this coincided with a major decline in popularity for 500cc events, as the major motorcycle manufacturers switched their attention to the 250cc series. Whilst the circuit was still used for national events, it was in the 1990s that Grand Prix racing was to leave Hawkstone Park. The circuit staged 500cc Grand Prix events until 1994, holding another event in 1997 and then held its final Grand Prix event of the decade in 1999, Sweden's Peter Johansson taking the overall victory.

== Present day ==
Hawkstone Park was to have a new lease of life, however, as it staged its first pre-season International event in 1999. Held every March, the International event sees some of the world's top riders competing at the circuit, gaining race speed prior to the full Grand Prix season. The event is seen as the "curtain-opener" to the British Motocross season, with crowds of over 10,000 regularly attending the International events.

Hawkstone Park also stages several amateur and historic race meetings every season along with a round of the ACU British Motocross Championship. The venue has also staged the British Trials Grand Prix, utilising the steep, rocky woodland surrounding the circuit as opposed to the motocross track itself.

In the past, the circuit has also been used for enduro events, utilising the motocross circuit and the woodland surrounding much of the circuit to create an extended lap of several miles.

The circuit is seen as one of the toughest motocross circuits in the UK, with many fans calling for it to return to the MX1 Motocross Grand Prix schedule. However, this is unlikely to happen, due to the high costs in staging a Grand Prix event, along with the relatively remote location and infrastructure in the local area. Despite this, Grand Prix motocross returned to the circuit in 2009, with the circuit hosting the opening round of the MX3 Motocross Grand Prix series. The Grand Prix event also featured the opening round of the European MX2 championship. Victory in the MX3 class went to Frenchman Julien Vanni, with fellow French rider Christophe Charlier winning the MX2 event. Despite the racing being described as some of the most exciting to take place at Hawkstone Park for some years, disappointing crowds meant the event made a financial loss, and is unclear whether the Grand Prix will be staged at the circuit in 2010.

== Other information ==
Popular singer Roy Orbison visited Hawkstone Park as a spectator at the 1965 500cc British Grand Prix. An avid motorcycle fan, he was offered the chance to try a lap of the circuit. Unfortunately he crashed, broke an ankle and appeared live on Saturday Night at the London Palladium that evening with his foot in a plaster cast.

The circuit has only suffered one fatality in its 60-year history as a motocross circuit, when 21-year-old Richard Fitch was killed whilst competing in a national championship in June 2005. Following fundraising efforts, a memorial bench in Fitch's memory was erected opposite the circuit's race control, shortly after the finishing line.

The circuit is not to be confused with the Hawkstone Park follies situated nearby. As race meetings are only staged occasionally during the year, the motocross circuit is signposted using temporary billboards and signs, however a common mistake for first time visitors is to follow the permanent road signs and end up at the historic Hawkstone Park follies!

== Riding at the circuit ==
The circuit is classed as private property and is not open for general practice. The circuit only stages a handful of race meetings per year, usually run by Salop Motor Club, or with assistance from the Salop Motor Club. Most events are open for amateur racers registered with either the AMCA or ACU governing bodies, although some of the higher profile events are limited to National championship riders or professional international riders.

The circuit is considered one of the most challenging in the UK, particularly in its Grand Prix configuration. Its deep sand and uneven surface require significant effort and concentration from riders. At the same time, it offers amateur riders a rare opportunity to experience an international-standard circuit.

== Other Motorcycle Sports ==
- Hawkstone Park was originally used for car and motorcycles hill climbs in the inter war years.
- Hawkstone Park has in recent years held a round of a major UK Hare and Hound series, which utilises the woodlands and the motocross circuit.
- Hawkstone Park is also a major motorcycle trials venue. In the 1980s it held the traditional first trial of the year, the British Experts (since discontinued). In 2005 and 2006 it held the British round of the World Trials Championship.
