= Neil Hudson =

Neil Hudson may refer to:

- Neil Hudson (motorcyclist) (born 1957), English former professional motocross racer
- Neil Hudson (politician), British Conservative Party MP for Epping Forest since 2024
