= 1981 FIM Motocross World Championship =

Motocross championship season

- Organizer: FIM
- Duration: 29 March/16 August
- Number of races: 36
- Number of manufacturers: 14

Champions
- 500cc: (Belgium) André Malherbe
- 250cc: (United Kingdom) Neil Hudson
- 125cc: (Belgium) Harry Everts

FIM Motocross World Championship
- ← 1980 1982 →

The 1981 FIM Motocross World Championship was the 25th F.I.M. Motocross Racing World Championship season.

== Summary ==
=== 500 class ===
The reigning 500cc World Champion André Malherbe (Honda) successfully defended his title after a season-long battle with his Honda teammate Graham Noyce who had missed most of the 1980 season after sustaining a broken leg. As in 1980, the championship wasn't decided until the final race in Luxembourg where Malherbe would prevail to score his second consecutive World Championship.

Malherbe began the year by winning the 500cc Austrian Grand Prix but then suffered a dislocated shoulder at the second round in Switzerland. He also experienced mechanical problems Sweden, France, and Great Britain which allowed Noyce to take the championship points lead at mid-season. Malherbe then reclaimed the championship points lead at his home Grand Prix in Belgium when Noyce withdrew with a mechanical failure. Noyce was 10 points behind Malherbe with one race left in the season however, Malherbe clinched the World Championship when he finished in second place behind Håkan Carlqvist (Yamaha) at the season-ending 500cc Luxembourg Grand Prix.

Carlqvist took third place in the championship with six podium results in the final six races of the season, including victories in the final two races of the year. Suzuki returned to Grand Prix motocross after a three-year hiatus and hired Brad Lackey, the 1980 500cc class runner-up. Lackey struggled with injuries and mechanical problems while developing a new motorcycle and dropped to sixth in the 1981 world championship. Future three-time World Champion David Thorpe competed in his first Motocross World Championship event at the 1981 500cc French Grand Prix riding for the Kawasaki-UK team.

=== 250 class ===
Georges Jobé (Suzuki) won five of the first seven Grand Prix races to lead the 1981 250cc Motocross World Championship by 53 points over his closest rival, Neil Hudson (Yamaha) with four rounds remaining and appeared to be heading towards a second consecutive World Championship when he was injured while competing in a Belgian National Championship race. He attempted to compete in the penultimate round in Russia but was injured again, allowing Hudson to overtake him and win the World Championship by only two points in the final standings.

=== 125 class ===
The 1981 125cc Motocross World Championship developed into a four-way battle between the defending champion Harry Everts (Suzuki), Michele Rinaldi (Gilera), Eric Geboers (Suzuki), and Marc Velkeneers (Yamaha). After the first ten rounds of the championship the four competitors were 12 points apart but, Everts won the last two Grand Prix races of the year to claim his third consecutive 125cc Motocross World Championship ahead of his Suzuki teammate, Geboers.

== Grands Prix ==
=== 500cc ===
Round	Date	Grand Prix	Location	Race 1 Winner	Race 2 Winner	Overall Winner	Report
1	April 5	(Austria) Austrian Grand Prix	Sittendorf	(Belgium) André Malherbe	(Belgium) André Malherbe	(Belgium) André Malherbe	Report
2	April 26	(Switzerland) Swiss Grand Prix	Payerne	(Sweden) Håkan Carlqvist	(Belgium) André Vromans	(Sweden) Håkan Carlqvist	Report
3	May 17	(Finland) Finnish Grand Prix	Ruskeasanta	(Belgium) André Vromans	(Finland) Tapani Pikkarainen	(Belgium) André Malherbe	Report
4	May 24	(Sweden) Swedish Grand Prix	Västerås	(United Kingdom) Graham Noyce	(Belgium) André Malherbe	(United Kingdom) Graham Noyce	Report
5	May 31	(Italy) Italian Grand Prix	Cingoli	(France) Jean-Jacques Bruno	(Belgium) André Malherbe	(Belgium) André Malherbe	Report
6	June 14	(France) French Grand Prix	Metz	(United Kingdom) Graham Noyce	(Sweden) Håkan Carlqvist	(United States) Brad Lackey	Report
7	June 21	United States Grand Prix	Carlsbad	(United States) Broc Glover	(United States) Chuck Sun	(United States) Chuck Sun	Report
8	July 5	(United Kingdom) British Grand Prix	Farleigh Castle	(Sweden) Håkan Carlqvist	(Sweden) Håkan Carlqvist	(Sweden) Håkan Carlqvist	Report
9	July 19	(Netherlands) Dutch Grand Prix	Lichtenvoorde	(United Kingdom) Graham Noyce	(Belgium) André Vromans	(Belgium) André Malherbe	Report
10	July 26	(Czech Republic) Czechoslovak Grand Prix	Sverepec	(Belgium) André Vromans	(France) Jean-Jacques Bruno	(France) Jean-Jacques Bruno	Report
11	August 2	(Belgium) Belgian Grand Prix	Namur	(France) Jean-Jacques Bruno	(Belgium) André Malherbe	(Sweden) Håkan Carlqvist	Report
12	August 9	Luxembourg Grand Prix	Ettelbruck	(Sweden) Håkan Carlqvist	(Belgium) André Vromans	(Sweden) Håkan Carlqvist	Report

=== 250cc ===
Round	Date	Grand Prix	Location	Race 1 Winner	Race 2 Winner	Overall Winner	Report
1	March 29	(France) French Grand Prix	Cognac	(West Germany) Fritz Schneider	(Netherlands) Kees van der Ven	(Belgium) Georges Jobé	Report
2	April 5	(Spain) Spanish Grand Prix	Sabadell	(Belgium) Georges Jobé	(Belgium) Georges Jobé	(Belgium) Georges Jobé	Report
3	May 3	(Austria) Austrian Grand Prix	Schwanenstadt	(United Kingdom) Neil Hudson	(Belgium) Georges Jobé	(United Kingdom) Neil Hudson	Report
4	May 17	(Italy) Italian Grand Prix	Gallarate	(Belgium) Georges Jobé	(Belgium) Georges Jobé	(Belgium) Georges Jobé	Report
5	May 24	(Czech Republic) Czechoslovak Grand Prix	Holice	(Belgium) Georges Jobé	(Belgium) Georges Jobé	(Belgium) Georges Jobé	Report
6	May 31	(Bulgaria) Bulgarian Grand Prix	Samokov	(United Kingdom) Neil Hudson	(Belgium) Georges Jobé	(United Kingdom) Neil Hudson	Report
7	June 14	(Switzerland) Swiss Grand Prix	Roggenburg	(Belgium) Georges Jobé	(Belgium) Georges Jobé	(Belgium) Georges Jobé	Report
8	June 21	(United Kingdom) British Grand Prix	Hawkstone Park	(Netherlands) Kees van der Ven	(United Kingdom) Neil Hudson	(Netherlands) Kees van der Ven	Report
9	July 5	(West Germany) West German Grand Prix	Beuren	(West Germany) Hans Maisch	(Belgium) Georges Jobé	(Belgium) Georges Jobé	Report
10	July 26	United States Grand Prix	Unadilla	(United States) Donnie Hansen	(United States) Steve Wise	(United Kingdom) Neil Hudson	Report
11	August 9	(Soviet Union) Russian Grand Prix	Leningrad	(United Kingdom) Neil Hudson	(United Kingdom) Neil Hudson	(United Kingdom) Neil Hudson	Report
12	August 16	(Netherlands) Dutch Grand Prix	Apeldoorn	(Netherlands) Kees van der Ven	(Netherlands) Kees van der Ven	(Netherlands) Kees van der Ven	Report

=== 125cc ===
Round	Date	Grand Prix	Location	Race 1 Winner	Race 2 Winner	Overall Winner	Report
1	March 30	(Italy) Italian Grand Prix	Lovolo	(Italy) Giuseppe Andreani	(Italy) Michele Rinaldi	(Italy) Michele Rinaldi	Report
2	April 5	(Netherlands) Dutch Grand Prix	Valkenswaard	(Belgium) Eric Geboers	(Belgium) Marc Velkeneers	(Belgium) Marc Velkeneers	Report
3	April 12	(Austria) Austrian Grand Prix	Launsdorf	(Japan) Akira Watanabe	(Belgium) Harry Everts	(Japan) Akira Watanabe	Report
4	April 26	(West Germany) West German Grand Prix	Niederwurzb	(Italy) Giuseppe Andreani	(Italy) Giuseppe Andreani	(Italy) Giuseppe Andreani	Report
5	May 3	(France) French Grand Prix	Berchères	(Belgium) Eric Geboers	(Japan) Akira Watanabe	(Belgium) Eric Geboers	Report
6	May 24	(Socialist Federal Republic of Yugoslavia) Yugoslavian Grand Prix	Tržič	(Belgium) Harry Everts	(Belgium) Harry Everts	(Belgium) Harry Everts	Report
7	May 31	(Poland) Polish Grand Prix	Szczecin	(Belgium) Marc Velkeneers	(Belgium) Eric Geboers	(Belgium) Harry Everts	Report
8	July 5	(Switzerland) Swiss Grand Prix	Frauenfeld	(Italy) Michele Rinaldi	(Finland) Matti Autio	(Belgium) Eric Geboers	Report
9	July 19	United States Grand Prix	Lexington	(United States) Mark Barnett	(United States) Mark Barnett	(United States) Mark Barnett	Report
10	August 2	(Finland) Finnish Grand Prix	Salo	(Belgium) Eric Geboers	(Italy) Michele Rinaldi	(Italy) Michele Rinaldi	Report
11	August 9	(Czech Republic) Czechoslovak Grand Prix	Dalečín	(Belgium) Harry Everts	(Belgium) Harry Everts	(Belgium) Harry Everts	Report
12	August 16	(Spain) Spanish Grand Prix	Montgai	(Belgium) Harry Everts	(Belgium) Eric Geboers	(Belgium) Eric Geboers	Report

== Final standings ==
Points are awarded based on the results of each individual heat race. The top 10 classified finishers in each heat race score points according to the following scale;

Position	1st	2nd	3rd	4th	5th	6th	7th	8th	9th	10th
Points	15	12	10	8	6	5	4	3	2	1

=== 500cc ===
(Results in italics indicate overall winner)

Pos	Rider	Machine	AUT (Austria)		CH (Switzerland)		FIN (Finland)		SWE (Sweden)		ITA (Italy)		FRA (France)		USA (United States)		UK (United Kingdom)		NED (Netherlands)		CZE (Czech Republic)		BEL (Belgium)		LUX (Luxembourg)		Points
1	(Belgium) André Malherbe	Honda	1	1	4	2	2	2	1		3	1		3		2		7	2	2	5	4	5	1	2	8	214
2	(United Kingdom) Graham Noyce	Honda		5	2		3	4	2	1	2	2	1	4	3	6	3	2	1	6	4	5	4		3	4	207
3	(Sweden) Håkan Carlqvist	Yamaha			1	4		8	3	2	5			1	2	8	1	1	5	3	3	2	3	2	1	2	201
4	(Belgium) André Vromans	Yamaha	3		5	1	1		5		4		8	5			9		10	1	1	3	2	3	6	1	154
5	(France) Jean-Jacques Bruno	Suzuki	2	2		3		3			1		4				2	10	3	7	2	1	1		5	3	152
6	(United States) Brad Lackey	Suzuki			3		6		7			5	2	2	6	3	6	3	6		6	9		4			99
7	(Netherlands) Gérard Rond	KTM		10				7	6	4	7	3	3	7		9	5	4	4		8	8	6	8			84
8	(Belgium) Jaak van Velthoven	KTM		3	6	6		5	8	6	6	6	5	9			4				7	7		6	7	5	83
9	(Belgium) Yvan van den Broeck	Maico		8	9			6	4	5		10		10			7	5	9		9		7		8	10	48
10	(Netherlands) Gerrit Wolsink	Honda	7							3					4	7		8	7	5		6			9		46
11	(Finland) Tapani Pikkarainen	Maico	8	9		5	9	1	9			7															34
12	(Sweden) Conny Carlsson	Husqvarna	9				4	9						6	10					8			8	5			30
13	(Austria) Georg Reiter	KTM	5	4	10	7	8			9	8																27
14	(United States) Chuck Sun	Honda													5	1											21
15	(United Kingdom) David Thorpe	Kawasaki											9				8								4	6	18
16	(Republic of Ireland) Laurence Spence	Yamaha		6					10		10		10										9	7		9	16
17	(United States) Broc Glover	Yamaha													1												15
17	(Italy) Franco Picco	Yamaha			8							4														7	15
19	(Netherlands) Toon Karsmakers	Honda																	8	4							11
20	(United States) Danny LaPorte	Honda													9	4											10
20	(United Kingdom) Geoff Mayes	Suzuki			7	8												9							10		10
22	(United States) Mike Bell	Yamaha													8	5											9
23	(West Germany) Herbert Schmitz	Maico	4																								8
23	(West Germany) Ludwig Reinbold	KTM										8	6														8
23	(West Germany) Walter Gruhler	Suzuki		7		9															10	10					8
23	(Finland) Jukka Sintonen	Suzuki								8		9		8													8
27	(Sweden) Arne Lindfors	Yamaha					5																				6
27	(United Kingdom) Billy Aldbridge	Suzuki															10	6									6
27	(United States) Marty Tripes	Husqvarna									9		7														6
30	(United Kingdom) Steve Beamish	Suzuki	6																								5
31	(Denmark) Arne Lodal	Yamaha					7																				4
31	(Sweden) Lasse Karlsson	KTM								7																	4
31	(United States) Marty Smith	Suzuki													7												4
31	(Luxembourg) Eddy Sterckx	Yamaha																		10			10	9			4
35	(Netherlands) Gieljo Van Zoggel	Maico																		9							2
35	(Sweden) Bertil Ovgard	Husqvarna				10	10																				2
37	(France) Patrick Boniface	Honda	10																								1
37	(Sweden) Gunnar Lindqvist	Suzuki						10																			1
37	(Sweden) Inge Edberg	Husqvarna								10																	1
37	(United States) Steve Rhyan	Husqvarna														10											1
37	(France) Daniel Péan	Kawasaki																						10			1

=== 250cc ===
(Results in italics indicate overall winner)

Pos	Rider	Machine	FRA (France)		ESP (Spain)		AUT (Austria)		ITA (Italy)		CZE (Czech Republic)		BUL (Bulgaria)		CH (Switzerland)		UK (United Kingdom)		GER (West Germany)		USA (United States)		USR (Soviet Union)		NED (Netherlands)		Points
1	(United Kingdom) Neil Hudson	Yamaha				2	1	2		2	2	2	1	2	2	2	3	1	6	2	2	2	1	1	4	6	235
2	(Belgium) Georges Jobé	Suzuki	5	2	1	1	4	1	1	1	1	1	5	1	1	1	2		2	1			2				233
3	(Netherlands) Kees van der Ven	Maico	8	1	9	3	7	3			3	3		5	8	9	1	2	10	5	3	3			1	1	159
4	(West Germany) Rolf Dieffenbach	Honda			7	4		6	2		4	6	10	3	3	3			9		5		3	3			101
5	(Austria) Heinz Kinigadner	Puch		3		8	3	8	7	8	8			8	4	5		4	7		8	7		4			80
6	(United States) Mike Guerra	Husqvarna			10	7	9	5			6	5	6				4	3	5	3					7	3	77
7	(Belgium) Jean-Claude Laquaye	SWM	4		2					9	5	4	2	6	7	6						9			10		65
8	(United Kingdom) Dave Watson	Yamaha					2			10		7	8		5	4	7			9		6	5	5	5		63
9	(Bulgaria) Dimitar Rangelov	Husqvarna						4	8	5			4	4	10					10			4	2			55
10	(Finland) Matti Tarkkonen	Yamaha	2	9					3			10				10		7					7	7	6	4	51
11	(Netherlands) Henk Van Mierlo	Husqvarna															5	5							2	2	36
11	(Denmark) Søren Mortensen	KTM		7	3				6			9							4	7	10				9		36
13	(Italy) Morizio Dolce	Maico			8		6	7		3			7	9		7							8				35
14	(West Germany) Hans Maisch	Maico			6	6				7									1				6				34
15	(Belgium) Jean-Paul Mingels	Yamaha	3						4										3					10			29
16	(Belgium) Raymond Boven	Husqvarna			5	9	5				7	8		7													25
17	(United States) Steve Wise	Honda																			4	1					23
18	(Netherlands) Peter Groeneveld	Honda		6					10	6								6						6			21
19	(United States) Donnie Hansen	Honda																			1						15
19	(West Germany) Fritz Schneider	Sachs	1																								15
19	(West Germany) Fritz Kobele	Honda			4		8				10								8								15
22	(Sweden) Sven Berggren	Husqvarna	9																						3	9	14
22	(Finland) Erkki Sundstrom	Honda						10									6	8				10				7	14
24	(Netherlands) Benny Wilken	Honda											9				8	9								5	13
25	(Finland) Simo Taimi	Husqvarna	6			10			5																		12
25	(France) Patrick Fura	Husqvarna	7								9			10						6							12
27	(Belgium) Paul Decendre	Husqvarna		4																					8		11
27	(Italy) Michele Magarotto	Gilera				5									6												11
29	(Austria) Willy Willinger	Puch											3														10
29	(Denmark) Arno Drechsel	Kawasaki							9	4																	10
31	(Sweden) Magnus Nyberg	KTM																		4							8
31	(United States) JoJo Keller	Suzuki																				4					8
31	(United States) Steve Martin	Suzuki																			9	5					8
34	(Soviet Union) Gennady Moiseyev	ČZ														8	10	10					10				6
34	(Norway) Jan Kristoffersen	Yamaha		5																							6
36	(United States) Kris Bigelow	Yamaha																			6						5
36	(Soviet Union) Vladimir Kavinov	ČZ																					9	8			5
38	(United States) David Bailey	Kawasaki																			7						4
39	(France) Patrick Gervaise	Maico		8																							3
39	(West Germany) Vilen Toman	Suzuki																		8							3
39	(United States) Chad Pedersen	Kawasaki																				8					3
39	(Netherlands) Dinant Zijlstra	Yamaha																								8	3
39	(Republic of Ireland) Steve Russell	Suzuki	10												9												3
44	(Italy) Alberto Dotti	Puch						9																			2
44	(United Kingdom) Rob Hooper	Maico															9										2
44	(Sweden) Leif Nicklasson	Husqvarna																						9			2
47	(Sweden) Rolf Wicksell	Husqvarna		10																							1
47	(Czech Republic) Zdeněk Velký	ČZ					10																				1
47	(Netherlands) Henk Bloemert	Husqvarna																								10	1

=== 125cc ===
(Results in italics indicate overall winner)

Pos	Rider	Machine	ITA (Italy)		NED (Netherlands)		AUT (Austria)		GER (West Germany)		FRA (France)		YUG (Socialist Federal Republic of Yugoslavia)		POL (Poland)		CH (Switzerland)		USA (United States)		FIN (Finland)		CZE (Czech Republic)		ESP (Spain)		Points
1	(Belgium) Harry Everts	Suzuki	8		2	3	4	1	2	4	9		1	1	2	4	7		5	5	5	2	1	1	1	2	211
2	(Belgium) Eric Geboers	Suzuki		3	1			6	4	2	1	3	5	7		1	4	3		6	1	3	3	2	2	1	197
3	(Italy) Michele Rinaldi	Gilera	2	1	6	4			3	3	4	2	3		3	6	1		6		2	1		4		3	170
4	(Belgium) Marc Velkeneers	Yamaha		9	3	1	2	3	7	6	2		2	3	1		5	4		8	3	4	2	3			164
5	(Japan) Akira Watanabe	Suzuki	3	2			1	2	6		5	1	8	2		2		2		3		5			3	5	146
6	(Italy) Giuseppe Andreani	KTM	1	7			3	8	1	1	3	4	10	5	4								4			6	108
7	(Belgium) Gaston Rahier	Gilera	6	4	4	5			5	7		5	4	8	6		2				4	8	7	8		4	97
8	(Italy) Corrado Maddii	Aprilia	4	6			10	4		10	8	6	7	6	5	8	9	8					5	5	6		71
9	(France) Jacky Vimond	Yamaha					7	10			6	8		4		3	3				10	6	8	10	7		55
10	(Belgium) Alain Lejeune	Cagiva			7	8	9		9			9	9		10		8	6			7		9	6	4		43
11	(Finland) Matti Autio	Honda	10		8	6										9		1			9		6	9		7	39
12	(Netherlands) Hank Seppenwoolde	Honda			5	7				9				9	7	5	10	7			6						34
13	(United States) Mark Barnett	Suzuki																	1	1							30
13	(Italy) Mauro Miele	KTM	5	5			8		8	5			6													10	30
15	(Luxembourg) Johan Martens	Yamaha				2	6	7			7				9												27
16	(Belgium) Jean-Marie Milissen	TGM									10	7			8	7		5						7	9		24
17	(Soviet Union) Yuri Khudiakov	ČZ				9	5	5		8																	17
18	(United States) Johnny O'Mara	Honda																	10	2							13
19	(United States) Jim Gibson	Honda																	2								12
20	(United States) Richard Coon	Honda																	3								10
21	(United States) Ricky Johnson	Yamaha																	4								8
21	(United States) Donnie Cantaloupe	Yamaha																		4							8
21	(United States) Scott Durnworth	Yamaha																	7	7							8
24	(Spain) Fernando Muñoz	Gilera		10																					5		7
24	(Belgium) Robert Greisch	Honda																					10		8	8	7
26	(Italy) Dario Nani	TGM															6										5
26	(United Kingdom) Jonathan Wright	Kawasaki	9	8																							5
26	(United States) Danny Bentley	Suzuki																	8	9							5
26	(Finland) Ari Viiri	Suzuki							10			10						9				10					5
30	(Austria) Friedrich Grabner	Yamaha	7																								4
30	(Netherlands) Andre Sprengelmayer	Yamaha																				7					4
32	(Netherlands) Erik Van Essen	Suzuki																			8						3
32	(Sweden) Jeff Nilsson	Yamaha																10								9	3
34	(Belgium) Johan Van Poppel	KTM			9																						2
34	(Austria) Helmut Frauwellner	Puch						9																			2
34	(United States) Danny Chandler	Suzuki																	9								2
34	(Finland) Seppo Isomaki	Suzuki																				9					2
38	(Netherlands) Johny Ponjee	Honda			10																						1
38	(Netherlands) Albert Ensing	Suzuki				10																					1
38	(France) Alain Fura	TGM												10													1
38	(Luxembourg) Guy Van Gysegheim	Honda														10											1
38	(United States) Phil Larson	Yamaha																		10							1
38	(Spain) Pablo Colomina	Gilera																							10		1
