= David Thorpe (motorcyclist) =

British motorcycle racer

- Nationality: British
- Born: September 29, 1962 (age 64) Sittingbourne, Kent, England

Motocross career
- Years active: 1981 - 1993
- Teams: Honda, Kawasaki
- Championships: 500cc - 1985, 1986, 1989
- Wins: 22

David Thorpe (born 29 September 1962) is a British former professional motocross racer and racing team manager. He competed in the Motocross World Championships from 1981 to 1993, most prominently as a member of the Honda factory racing team where he became a three-time FIM 500cc Motocross World Champion. In 2023, Thorpe was named an FIM Legend for his motorcycling achievements.

== Motocross career ==
=== Early racing ===
Thorpe was born in Sittingbourne, Kent, England on September 29, 1962. His father had competed in off-road motorcycle races called scrambles which eventually became known as motocross racing. He followed in his father's footsteps and began to compete in motocross racing from an early age. Thorpe's early career saw him excel in both motocross and football, and at one stage he was even offered a contract with the Queen's Park Rangers football club before opting to concentrate on motocross. He won numerous British Championships at every level as he rose through the amateur classes with his father serving as his mechanic. His father would continue to be his mechanic throughout his amateur and professional racing career.

At the age of 18, Thorpe competed in his first Motocross World Championship event at the 1981 500cc French Grand Prix riding for the Kawasaki-UK team. At the season-opening 1982 500cc French Grand Prix, Thorpe scored an impressive second place finish behind the reigning 500cc World Champion, André Malherbe (Honda). He scored two more second place results that season in the Austrian and British Grand Prix events to finish the season ranked sixth in the 1982 500cc Motocross World Championship.

=== Honda factory racing team ===
Thorpe joined the Honda HRC factory racing team for the 1983 season alongside teammates Malherbe and Graham Noyce. Thorpe spent the first season with Honda trying to become acclimated to his new motorcycle and ended the year ranked fifth in the 500cc World Championship.

The 1984 500cc Motocross World Championship featured one of the most talented field of competitors of the 1980s. Thorpe was challenged by his Honda teammates Malherbe and Eric Geboers as well as Yamaha's defending 500cc World Champion Håkan Carlqvist and the 1983 250cc World Champion Georges Jobé riding for the Kawasaki factory racing team. The 1984 500cc championship is prominent for featuring all three of the previous year's world champions – Carlqvist (500cc), Jobé (250cc) and Geboers (125cc).

Thorpe won the first 500cc Grand Prix race of his career with the Honda team at the 1984 500cc Swedish Grand Prix to take the championship points lead however, he would be overtaken by his teammate Malherbe who won the title to claim his third 500cc World Championship. Thorpe ended the season strongly by winning the last three Grand Prix races of the year to place third in the World Championship behind Malherbe and second placed Jobé.

The 1985 500cc Motocross World Championship featured a battle between Honda teammates Malherbe and Thorpe. Despite Malherbe winning five Grand Prix races, Thorpe was able to finish on the podium in all twelve Grand Prix races to claim his first 500cc Motocross World Championship ahead of Malherbe in second place and their Honda teammate, Eric Geboers, in third place. Thorpe was also the top individual points scorer at the 1985 Motocross des Nations event in Gaildorf, Germany, defeating American riders Jeff Ward and David Bailey.

The 1986 500cc Motocross World Championship saw the resumption of the rivalry between Thorpe and the three Belgian riders Malherbe, Jobé and Geboers in a season-long battle that wasn't decided until the final round. Entering the final round in Luxembourg, the four competitors were separated by only 20 points with Thorpe holding a three-point lead over Malherbe. Thorpe was able to score a second-place finish behind Jobé to clinch his second consecutive World Championship just 5 points ahead of Malherbe.

Thorpe began the 1987 season with three consecutive victories in the Spanish, French and Austrian Grands Prix to take the championship points lead but, then suffered a broken shoulder that forced him to withdraw from the remaining races. His new Honda teammate Jobé won the 500cc World Championship while Thorpe dropped to fifth place. In 1988, he was once again leading the World Championship when he broke his collarbone in the 500cc Dutch Grand Prix forcing him to miss the remainder of the season. He ended the year ranked third in the championship behind his Honda teammate Eric Geboers and Kurt Nicoll (Kawasaki).

Thorpe won the third and final 500cc World Championship of his career in 1989 after a season-long battle for the points lead with his Honda teammate Geboers. The points lead went back and forth between the two teammates during the early rounds until Geboers surged to a 29-point lead at mid-season and seemed poised to win the championship. However, Thorpe would re-motivate himself after a poor performance at the 500cc United States Grand Prix and won the last four races of the year to overtake Geboers and claim his third 500cc World Championship. The 1989 Motocross des Nations event was once again held in Gaildorf, Germany where Thorpe repeated as the top individual points scorer in the 500cc class.

=== Later career ===
After the Honda team refused to re-hire his father as his mechanic, Thorpe signed a contract to race for the Kawasaki factory team. The Kawasaki machine proved to be inferior to the Honda, and Thorpe struggled with the chassis for some time. In 1990 and 1991 he finished fifth and seventh respectively in the 500cc World Championship. Thorpe's victory at the 1991 500cc Luxembourg Grand Prix would mark the 22nd and final win of his career. He left Kawasaki in 1991, and moved back to Honda, riding for the Italian 'Cinti Honda' team. He was unable to capture his old form and retired from professional motocross competition in 1993 at the age of 31. Thorpe remains the last British rider to have won the premier division of the motocross world championships.

== Career overview ==
Thorpe won 50 individual heat races and 22 Grand Prix victories during his world championship racing career. He was a three-time 500cc World Champion (1985, 1986, 1989), a 250cc British motocross national champion (1982) and a five-time 500cc British motocross national champion (1983-1987). He was a member of seven British Motocross des Nations teams (1981-1986, 1989) and three Trophée des Nations teams (1982-1984). Thorpe was the top 500cc points scorer at the 1985 and 1989 Motocross des Nations events.

== Post-Motocross career ==
After his competitive career, Thorpe served as manager of the British Motocross des Nations team, which included the upset victory by the 1994 British team of Rob Herring, Paul Malin and Kurt Nicoll. The victory marked the first time a British team had won the event since 1967 and, broke a 13-year American winning streak at the Motocross des Nations. Afterwards, Thorpe concentrated on team management, running a UK based Honda team during the late 1990s with rider Mike Brown. The team was a success both in the UK and on the Grand Prix circuit, however Honda suddenly withdrew their support (along with several other teams) in 2001, and the team disbanded.

In recent years, Thorpe has returned to motocross, although he now competes for fun, competing in his local regional championship with great success. He has been clerk of the course of the West of England MCC's Patchquick trophy meeting. Thorpe also started an Adventure and Off-Road Centre based in the Exmoor National Park with ties to Honda. The centre allows people to try out off-road motorcycles in a safe, supervised environment.

In 2007, Thorpe contested the two round, FIM Veterans Motocross World Cup in the senior class. Thorpe won the overall victory at both rounds (Namur, Belgium and Donington Park, Great Britain), giving him his fourth world title.

== Motocross Grand Prix Results ==
Points system from 1969 to 1983:

Position	1	2	3	4	5	6	7	8	9	10
Points	15	12	10	8	6	5	4	3	2	1

Points system from 1984:

Position	1st	2nd	3rd	4th	5th	6th	7th	8th	9th	10th	11th	12th	13th	14th	15th
Points	20	17	15	13	11	10	9	8	7	6	5	4	3	2	1

Year	Class	Team	1		2		3		4		5		6		7		8		9		10		11		12		Pos	Pts
Year	Class	Team	R1	R2	R1	R2	R1	R2	R1	R2	R1	R2	R1	R2	R1	R2	R1	R2	R1	R2	R1	R2	R1	R2	R1	R2	Pos	Pts
1981	500cc	Kawasaki	AUT -	AUT -	CH -	CH -	FIN -	FIN -	SWE -	SWE -	ITA -	ITA -	FRA; 9	FRA -	USA -	USA -	UK; 8	UK -	NED -	NED -	CZE -	CZE -	BEL -	BEL -	LUX; 4	LUX; 6	15th	18
1982	500cc	Kawasaki	FRA; 6	FRA; 2	NED -	NED -	SWE; 6	SWE; 7	FIN; 6	FIN; 7	AUT; 1	AUT; 3	ITA -	ITA; 5	GER; 7	GER; 5	USA -	USA -	CAN -	CAN -	UK; 1	UK; 3	BEL; 5	BEL; 3	LUX -	LUX -	6th	117
1983	500cc	Honda	CH -	CH; 6	AUT -	AUT -	GER; 5	GER; 5	SWE; 6	SWE; 4	FIN -	FIN; 8	ITA; 2	ITA; 8	USA -	USA; 10	FRA; 3	FRA; 4	UK; 5	UK -	BEL; 7	BEL; 5	SM; 4	SM; 10	NED; 10	NED -	5th	93
1984	500cc	Honda	AUT; 2	AUT; 3	CH; 3	CH; 2	ESP; 4	ESP; 2	FRA; 4	FRA; 2	SWE; 3	SWE; 1	GER; 2	GER; 3	NED; 4	NED; 5	USA; 10	USA; 8	CAN -	CAN -	UK; 1	UK; 1	BEL; 1	BEL; 1	ITA; 1	ITA; 1	3rd	349
1985	500cc	Honda	AUT; 2	AUT; 2	FRA -	FRA; 1	SWE; 2	SWE; 2	FIN; 4	FIN; 5	ITA; 1	ITA; 1	ESP; 4	ESP; 3	NED; 2	NED; 1	USA; 4	USA; 2	UK; 1	UK; 2	BEL; 2	BEL; 1	LUX; 1	LUX; 2	CH; 1	CH; 6	1st	388
1986	500cc	Honda	CH -	CH -	AUT; 1	AUT -	NED; 2	NED; 1	SWE; 2	SWE; 3	FIN; 2	FIN; 2	GER; 4	GER; 1	CAN; 1	CAN; 7	USA; 6	USA; 6	FRA; 9	FRA; 2	UK; 3	UK; 4	BEL; 5	BEL; 4	LUX; 1	LUX; 3	1st	316
1987	500cc	Honda	ESP; 1	ESP; 1	FRA; 3	FRA; 1	AUT; 4	AUT; 1	FIN -	FIN -	SWE; 9	SWE -	GER; 4	GER; 2	ITA -	ITA -	UK; 3	UK; 11	NED -	NED -	BEL -	BEL -	LUX -	LUX -	CH; 2	CH -	5th	182
1988	500cc	Honda	AUT; 1	AUT; 1	CH; 1	CH; 4	SWE; 5	SWE; 2	FIN; 4	FIN; 5	GER; 3	GER; 3	ITA; 3	ITA; 6	USA; 1	USA; 5	UK; 1	UK; 1	NED -	NED -	SM -	SM -	BEL -	BEL -	LUX -	LUX -	3rd	251
1989	500cc	Honda	NED; 7	NED; 11	FRA; 3	FRA; 1	AUT; 1	AUT; 1	ITA; 5	ITA; 1	FIN; 7	FIN; 7	SWE; 9	SWE; 4	USA; 8	USA -	SM; 3	SM; 1	UK; 1	UK; 1	BEL; 2	BEL; 1	LUX; 1	LUX; 1	CH; 1	CH; 1	1st	358
1990	500cc	Kawasaki	NED; 7	NED -	CH; 2	CH; 8	AUT; 1	AUT; 1	FRA; 4	FRA -	FIN; 6	FIN; 7	ITA; 3	ITA; 3	UK; 5	UK; 11	GER; 12	GER -	SM; 3	SM; 10	BEL; 1	BEL -	LUX; 3	LUX; 2	USA -	USA -	5th	233
1991	500cc	Kawasaki	CH -	CH -	AUT -	AUT -	FIN -	FIN -	SWE; 7	SWE; 15	FRA; 3	FRA -	NED -	NED -	ITA; 4	ITA -	UK; 6	UK; 12	GER; 2	GER; 1	BEL; 6	BEL -	LUX; 1	LUX; 1	USA -	USA; 11	7th	144

Year	Class	Team	1			2			3			4			5			6			7			8			9			10			11			12			Pos	Pts
Year	Class	Team	R1	R2	R3	R1	R2	R3	R1	R2	R3	R1	R2	R3	R1	R2	R3	R1	R2	R3	R1	R2	R3	R1	R2	R3	R1	R2	R3	R1	R2	R3	R1	R2	R3	R1	R2	R3	Pos	Pts
1992	500cc	Honda	USA; 9	USA; 10	USA -	CZE -	CZE -	CZE -	AUT; 14	AUT -	AUT -	FIN; 13	FIN; 10	FIN -	SM; 7	SM -	SM -	GER -	GER -	GER -	UK; 9	UK -	UK -	FRA; 5	FRA; 10	FRA -	NED -	NED -	NED -	BEL; 4	BEL; 11	BEL -	LUX; 7	LUX; 9	LUX; 14	CH -	CH; 8	CH; 14	17th	103
1993	500cc	Honda	UK; 7	UK; 15	UK; 13	AUT; 9	AUT; 8	AUT -	SWE; 12	SWE; 12	SWE; 15	FIN; 9-	FIN -	FIN -	ITA -	ITA -	ITA -	GER -	GER -	GER -	POR -	POR -	POR -	NED -	NED -	NED -	BEL; 12	BEL; 5	BEL; 10	LUX; 13	LUX; 15	LUX -	SLO; 8	SLO; 11	SLO -	CH; 8	CH; 6	CH -	17th	93
