= Håkan Carlqvist =

Swedish motocross racer

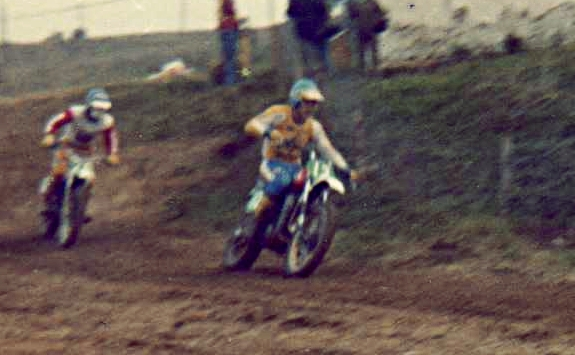
- Carlqvist at the 1978 Spanish Grand Prix
- Nationality: Swedish
- Born: 15 January 1954 Järfälla, Sweden
- Died: 6 July 2017 (aged 63) Toulon, France

Motocross career
- Years active: 1974-1988
- Teams: Ossa, Husqvarna, Yamaha
- Championships: 250cc - 1979; 500cc - 1983
- Wins: 21

Håkan Carlqvist (15 January 1954 – 6 July 2017) was a Swedish professional motocross racer. He competed in the FIM Motocross World Championships from 1974 to 1988. Carlqvist was a two-time Motocross World Champion known for his fierce competitiveness and fiery temperament. He was one of the last in a long line of Swedish World Champions such as Bill Nilsson, Sten Lundin, Rolf Tibblin and Torsten Hallman who dominated international motocross racing during the early formative years of the sport.

== Biography ==
=== Early racing career ===
Carlqvist was born on 15 January 1954 in the Järfälla Municipality just outside of Stockholm, Sweden, As a youth, he excelled in multiple sports such as ice hockey, football, and downhill skiing. He began riding a 125cc street motorcycle at the age of 16 and within a year, he had progressed to riding a KTM enduro motorcycle. In 1972, he moved up to the Senior Division of Swedish national motocross competitions riding a Maico motorcycle.

=== Grand Prix racing ===
At the age of 20, Carlqvist scored his first Motocross World Championship points at the 1974 250cc West German Grand Prix competing as a privateer aboard a Husqvarna motorcycle. His good results earned him sponsorship from the Spanish motorcycle manufacturer Ossa for the 1975 FIM Motocross World Championship however, he broke his wrist in February and was forced to miss the first half of the season. In the middle of the 1976 season, the Ossa withdrew their team from competition due to financial constraints leaving Carlqvist without a motorcycle. He finished the 1976 250cc championship riding a Kawasaki motorcycle given to him by Kawasaki factory team rider Torleif Hansen. Carlqvist rode the Kawasaki to score the first podium finish of his career with a third place at the 1976 250cc Swedish Grand Prix.

Carlqvist's performance at the Swedish Grand Prix caught the attention of the Husqvarna factory racing team who offered to support him for the 1977 season. Carlqvist chose to abandon his promising professional ice hockey career and commit himself to a professional motocross racing career. He began the 1977 250cc World Championship with top five results in the first two rounds but he then broke his leg at the 250cc Belgium Grand Prix once again forcing him to miss most of the season. Husqvarna did not renew his contract for the 1978 season but offered him a production machine and some spare parts. Carlqvist won the first heat race of his Grand Prix career with a victory in the second heat race at the season-opening 250cc Spanish Grand Prix however, he failed to score consistently and ended the season ranked seventh in the championship points standings. Carlqvist was the top individual points scorer at the season-ending 1978 Trophée des Nations event held in Kester, Belgium.

Despite his lackluster season, the Husqvarna factory offered Carlqvist a factory prepared motorcycle along with mechanic Tommy Jansson for the 1979 season. Jansson was a former motocross racer whose experience allowed him to properly prepare Carlqvist's motorcycle as well as offer moral and psychological support. Jansson's assistance allowed Carlqvist to focus his attention on racing and he went on to dominate the 1979 season. He won six of the twelve Grand Prix events, finishing comfortably ahead of second-placed Neil Hudson to be crowned the 250cc World Champion. He also won the 1979 Le Touquet beach race. At the 1979 Trophée des Nations event held in Barkarby, Sweden, Carlqvist was once again the top individual points scorer.

=== Yamaha factory team ===
Carlqvist joined the Yamaha factory racing team for the 1980 season, replacing Heikki Mikkola who had made the decision to retire from competition. He faced a strong field of competitors in 1980 that included the Honda HRC factory team that featured the defending champion Graham Noyce, five-time World Champion Roger De Coster, and André Malherbe who would go on to become a three-time World Champion. He was also challenged by Kawasaki's Brad Lackey and his own Yamaha teammate, the talented newcomer André Vromans. Although Carlqvist won the 500cc Swedish Grand Prix, the season was dominated by Malherbe and Lackey as he struggled to adapt to his new Yamaha motorcycle. He ended the season ranked third in the world behind Malherbe and Lackey. After a slow start to the 1981 500cc World Championship, Carlqvist finished the season strongly with seven consecutive podium positions to end the season in third place just six points behind Noyce as Malherbe won his second consecutive 500cc title. He was also the top individual points scorer at the 1981 Motocross des Nations event held in Bielstein, West Germany.

In 1982, Carlqvist suffered a broken arm in a pre-season accident forcing him to miss the opening rounds and he ended the season in seventh place. In the 1983 500cc World Championship, Carlqvist's main competitors were the Honda teammates Graham Noyce and the defending champion André Malherbe. Noyce faded in the second half of the season as Carlqvist and Malherbe continued to battle back and forth in one of the hardest fought championships in several years. The championship wasn't decided until the final race of the year in Holland where Carlqvist prevailed to win the 500cc World Championship by seven points over Malherbe. He was the first Swedish competitor to win the premier motocross class since Bengt Åberg in 1970.

The 1984 500cc Motocross World Championship featured one of the most talented field of competitors of the 1980s. The 1984 season is prominent for featuring all three of the previous year's world champions – Carlqvist (500cc), Georges Jobé (250cc) and Eric Geboers (125cc). Besides Jobé (Kawasaki) and Geboers (Honda), Carlqvist also had to contend with Honda teammates two-time World Champion André Malherbe, 1979 World Champion Graham Noyce and future three-time World Champion David Thorpe. Unfortunately, another injury during the 1984 World Championship stopped Carlqvist from defending his title.

=== Later career and death ===
Carlqvist continued to race for Yamaha until end of 1986 when he began to compete as a privateer riding a Kawasaki KX500. One of the most memorable moments in his motocross racing career occurred at the 1988 500cc Belgian Grand Prix held at Namur. The setting of the Belgian Grand Prix was a rugged, narrow track in the forests surrounding the picturesque hilltop Citadel of Namur. First held in 1947, the Namur Grand Prix was revered by motocross enthusiasts in the same manner that auto racing enthusiasts considered the Monaco Grand Prix to be the crown jewel of the Formula One season. Carlqvist had won the first heat race and was leading the second heat race by over thirty seconds when, he stopped trackside where his brother was holding out a can of beer. Carlqvist proceeded to drink the beer as the spectators cheered his display of bravado. He then proceeded to win the race to claim the 21st and final Grand Prix of his career. He retired from competition at the age of 34 at the conclusion of the 1988 season.

In 1983, alongside his motocross racing, Carlqvist began competing in three-wheeled ATV racing. He was first with Yamaha but in 1986 he rode for Honda and he won the Swedish three wheeled national championship. He had plans to come to the United States in 1987 to race for Honda and several Honda ATCs were built specially for him. However, under political pressures ATCs and three wheelers were banned in the United States following many reported injuries and pressure from consumer groups. He never made it to America to race for Honda.

Carlqvist died on 6 July 2017 at the age of 63 from the effects of a brain hemorrhage he suffered the previous day.

== Career overview ==
Carlqvist won 37 individual heat races and 21 Grand Prix victories during his world championship racing career. He won two Motocross World Championships (250cc-1979, 500cc-1983) and five 500cc Swedish Motocross Championships (250cc-1979, 500cc-1980-1983). He was a member of eight Swedish Motocross des Nations teams (1977–1981, 1984, 1985, 1988) and six Trophée des Nations teams (1977–1981, 1984). Carlqvist was the top individual points scorer at the 1978 and 1979 Trophée des Nations events and the 1981 Motocross des Nations event. Carlqvist was the second competitor to win both the 500cc and 250cc Motocross World Championships after Heikki Mikkola (500cc-1974, 250cc-1976).

Kenth Öhlin, the founder of Öhlins, a leading manufacturer of performance suspension systems for the automotive, motorcycle and mountain bike industries, credits Carlqvist's contributions in helping his young company succeed in its formative years. They first collaborated while Carlqvist was riding for the Husqvarna factory racing team. Carlqvist's valuable feedback from test riding motorcycles equipped with Öhlins suspension systems, helped to further the development of their products. Their collaboration continued when Carlqvist moved to the Yamaha team.

== Awards and honors ==
After winning the 500cc Motocross World Championship in 1983, Carlqvist was awarded the prestigious Svenska Dagbladet Gold Medal for accomplishing the most significant Swedish sports achievement of the year.

In honor of Carlqvist's contributions to Swedish motorcycling, in 2002 the Swedish postal service issued a stamp within the Sverige Motocross series that depicted Carlqvist riding his Yamaha motorcycle.

== Motocross Grand Prix Results ==
Points system from 1969 to 1983:

Position	1	2	3	4	5	6	7	8	9	10
Points	15	12	10	8	6	5	4	3	2	1

Year	Class	Team	1		2		3		4		5		6		7		8		9		10		11		12		Pos	Pts
Year	Class	Team	R1	R2	R1	R2	R1	R2	R1	R2	R1	R2	R1	R2	R1	R2	R1	R2	R1	R2	R1	R2	R1	R2	R1	R2	Pos	Pts
1974	250cc	Husqvarna	ESP -	ESP -	ITA -	ITA -	CZE -	CZE -	POL -	POL -	YUG -	YUG -	UK -	UK -	GER; 8	GER -	NED -	NED -	FIN -	FIN; 8	SWE -	SWE; 10	CH -	CH -			25th	7
1975	250cc	Ossa	ESP -	ESP -	AUT -	AUT -	BEL -	BEL -	CZE -	CZE -	POL -	POL -	YUG -	YUG -	GER; 8	GER; 5	UK; 8	UK -	FRA -	FRA -	SWE -	SWE -	FIN; 10	FIN -	CH; 9	CH; 9	23rd	11
1976	250cc	Ossa	ESP; 8	ESP -	BEL -	BEL -	CZE -	CZE -	POL; 6	POL; 9	USR -	USR; 9	YUG -	YUG; 8	ITA -	ITA -	FRA -	FRA -	UK -	UK -	GER -	GER -					15th	32
1976	250cc	Kawasaki																					NED; 6	NED -	SWE; 5	SWE; 5	15th	32
1977	250cc	Husqvarna	ESP; 4	ESP; 6	CH -	CH; 5	BEL -	BEL -	CZE -	CZE -	ITA -	ITA -	AUT -	AUT -	USR -	USR -	YUG -	YUG -	GER -	GER -	UK; 7	UK -	SWE -	SWE -	FIN -	FIN -	17th	23
1978	250cc	Husqvarna	ESP -	ESP; 1	ITA -	ITA; 10	CZE; 8	CZE -	YUG -	YUG; 8	AUT -	AUT; 9	GER; 5	GER; 8	UK; 5	UK -	FRA; 3	FRA; 6	USA -	USA; 8	SWE; 2	SWE; 5	FIN; 2	FIN; 4	USR; 8	USR -	7th	88
1979	250cc	Husqvarna	ESP; 2	ESP; 1	NED; 1	NED; 1	ITA -	ITA; 1	BEL; 3	BEL; 1	YUG; 1	YUG; 5	CZE; 1	CZE; 1	POL; 1	POL; 1	FRA; 1	FRA; 1	FIN -	FIN -	USA -	USA; 3	GER; 1	GER; 1	BUL -	BUL -	1st	248
1980	500cc	Yamaha	CH; 3	CH; 3	AUT; 2	AUT; 2	FRA; 4	FRA -	SWE; 2	SWE; 1	FIN -	FIN -	ITA; 10	ITA; 8	NED; 4	NED -	USA; 2	USA -	CAN; 2	CAN; 2	GER; 4	GER; 1	BEL; 4	BEL; 3	LUX; 4	LUX; 2	3rd	188
1981	500cc	Yamaha	AUT -	AUT -	CH; 1	CH; 4	FIN -	FIN; 8	SWE; 3	SWE; 2	ITA; 5	ITA -	FRA -	FRA; 1	USA; 2	USA; 8	UK; 1	UK; 1	NED; 5	NED; 3	CZE; 3	CZE; 2	BEL; 3	BEL; 2	LUX; 1	LUX; 2	3rd	201
1982	500cc	Yamaha	FRA -	FRA -	NED -	NED -	SWE -	SWE -	FIN; 2	FIN; 8	AUT; 4	AUT -	ITA; 3	ITA -	GER; 1	GER -	USA -	USA -	CAN -	CAN -	UK -	UK -	BEL; 8	BEL -	LUX; 1	LUX; 1	8th	81
1983	500cc	Yamaha	CH; 4	CH -	AUT; 1	AUT; 2	GER; 2	GER; 6	SWE; 1	SWE; 2	FIN; 4	FIN; 2	ITA; 1	ITA; 2	USA; 1	USA; 2	FRA -	FRA; 2	UK; 1	UK; 1	BEL; 1	BEL; 2	SM; 3	SM; 1	NED; 6	NED; 4	1st	260
1984	500cc	Yamaha	AUT; 4	AUT; 2	CH; 4	CH -	ESP; 3	ESP; 5	FRA -	FRA -	SWE -	SWE -	GER -	GER -	NED -	NED -	USA -	USA -	CAN -	CAN -	UK; 4	UK -	BEL -	BEL -	ITA; 3	ITA; 5	10th	97
1985	500cc	Yamaha	AUT -	AUT -	FRA -	FRA; 6	SWE -	SWE -	FIN; 8	FIN -	ITA -	ITA -	ESP; 5	ESP; 6	NED -	NED -	USA -	USA -	UK -	UK -	BEL; 8	BEL; 3	LUX -	LUX -	CH -	CH -	16th	62
1986	500cc	Yamaha	CH -	CH -	AUT; 2	AUT -	NED; 6	NED -	SWE; 4	SWE; 4	FIN; 3	FIN; 8	GER -	GER; 7	CAN; 8	CAN -	USA; 9	USA; 8	FRA; 11	FRA; 6	UK; 6	UK; 6	BEL -	BEL -	LUX; 4	LUX -	8th	156
1987	500cc	Kawasaki	ESP; 8	ESP; 2	FRA; 1	FRA; 6	AUT; 1	AUT -	FIN -	FIN; 6	SWE -	SWE -	GER -	GER -	ITA; 7	ITA -	UK; 8	UK -	NED -	NED -	BEL -	BEL -	LUX -	LUX -	CH -	CH -	12th	102
1988	500cc	Kawasaki	AUT -	AUT; 2	CH; 8	CH; 10	SWE; 2	SWE -	FIN -	FIN -	GER -	GER -	ITA; 9	ITA; 3	USA; 12	USA; 15	UK -	UK -	NED -	NED -	SM -	SM -	BEL; 1	BEL; 1	LUX; 10	LUX; 2	10th	138

Preceded by Mats Wilander	Svenska Dagbladet Gold Medal; 1983	Succeeded by Gunde Svan
