= Eric Geboers =

Belgian motorcycle racer

- Geboers receiving the FIM Motocross Legend Trophy in 2011
- Nationality: Belgian
- Born: Eric Henri Gerarda Geboers; 5 August 1962 Neerpelt, Belgium
- Died: 6 May 2018 (aged 55) Mol, Belgium

Motocross career
- Years active: 1980 - 1990
- Teams: Suzuki, Honda
- Championships: 125cc- 1982, 1983; 250cc- 1987; 500cc- 1988, 1990
- Wins: 39

Eric Henri Gerarda Geboers (5 August 1962 – 6 May 2018) was a Belgian professional motocross racer and racing driver. He competed in the Motocross World Championships from 1980 to 1990 riding for the Suzuki and Honda factory racing teams. A five-time world champion, Geboers is notable for being the first motocross competitor to win each of the three world championship classes (125cc, 250cc, and 500cc). His 39 career Grand Prix victories ranks him fifth overall among motocross world championship competitors.

In 1988, Geboers was named the recipient of the Belgian National Sports Merit Award. In 2011, Geboers was named an FIM Legend for his motorcycling achievements. Geboers died in a drowning accident in 2018.

== Biography ==
=== Early racing career ===
Geboers was born in Neerpelt, Belgium on August 5, 1962. His father was an amateur motocross racer who owned a petrol station that also sold automobiles, mopeds and scooters. He was the youngest of five brothers with Sylvain Geboers being the oldest, 16 years his senior. Sylvain Geboers had ridden for the ČZ and Suzuki factory racing teams and finished in the top three of the 250cc motocross world championships for five consecutive years between 1968 and 1972.

All five brothers followed their father's lead by becoming motorcycle racers and a supporter's club was formed out of a desire to help further their racing careers. For nearly 30 years, from the beginning of Sylvain's career in the early 1960s to the end of Eric's career in 1990, the supporter's club remained active by raising funds through subscription fees and by organizing tours to watch the brothers compete.

=== World championships ===
Geboers began racing professional motocross in the 1980 125cc Motocross World Championship for the Suzuki factory racing team with his brother Sylvain serving as Eric's team manager and mechanic. He made an immediate impact by winning the 1980 125cc French Grand Prix in only the second Grand Prix of his career. He went on to win two more Grand Prix races in Germany and Czechoslovakia to finish the season ranked third in the championship behind Harry Everts (Suzuki) and Michele Rinaldi (TGM).

The 1981 125cc Motocross World Championship developed into a four-way battle between Geboers, Everts, Rinaldi and Marc Velkeneers (Yamaha). After the first ten rounds of the championship the four competitors were 12 points apart. Everts won the last two Grand Prix races of the year to claim his third consecutive 125cc Motocross World Championship while Geboers won three Grand Prix races to improve to second place in the championship behind Everts.

In 1982, Geboers overtook the early championship leader Velkeneers and went on to dominate the second half of the season by winning five of the last six Grand Prix races to claim his first 125cc Motocross World Championship for Suzuki. He successfully defended his title for Suzuki in 1983 by winning 15 out of 24 heat races and six out of twelve Grand Prix races during the 125cc Motocross World Championship. At the 1983 125cc Coupe des Nations event, he finished second to Belgian teammate Velkeneers as the top individual points scorers to help the Belgian team win the event.

=== Honda factory team ===
Suzuki's decision to withdraw from the Motocross World Championships at the end of the 1983 season due to a worldwide economic recession led Geboers to sign a contract to become a member of the powerful Honda HRC factory racing team that included the reigning world champion André Malherbe as well as David Thorpe and André Vromans. While with the Honda team, he was given the nickname The Kid by Honda team manager Steve Whitlock due to his small stature.

The 1984 500cc Motocross World Championship saw an elevated level of competition with Geboers facing off against his Honda teammates Malherbe and Thorpe as well as Håkan Carlqvist (Yamaha) and Georges Jobé (Kawasaki). The 1984 500cc season is prominent for featuring all three of the previous year's world champions – Carlqvist (500cc), Jobé (250cc) and Geboers (125cc). While the 1984 season would be dominated by Malherbe, Jobé and Thorpe, Geboers managed to win the 500cc Dutch Grand Prix and scored three second-place results before an injury forced him to miss the last three races of the year. He ended the season ranked fifth in the championship. Geboers improved to third place in the 1985 500cc motocross world championship behind his Honda teammates Malherbe and Thorpe.

The 1986 500cc Motocross World Championship saw the resumption of the rivalry between the three Honda teammates as well as Kawasaki's Georges Jobé in a season-long battle that wasn't decided until the final round. Entering the final round in Luxembourg, the four competitors were separated by only 20 points with Thorpe holding a three-point lead over Geboers in second place with Malherbe and Jobé following closely in third and fourth. Thorpe was able to score a second-place finish behind Jobé to clinch his second consecutive World Championship just 5 points ahead of Malherbe with Geboers finishing the season in third place as Honda swept the top three spots in the 500cc World Championship for the second consecutive year.

Whitlock convinced Geboers to compete in the 250cc World Championship in 1987, with the promise that he could return to the 500cc class if he won the 250cc title. Geboers won five Grand Prix races to win the 1987 250cc world championship, earning a return to the premier 500cc division. He would battle his Honda teammate Thorpe in a tight points race during the 1988 500cc championship until Thorpe broke his collarbone in the 500cc Dutch Grand Prix forcing him to miss the remainder of the season. Geboers went on to win his first of two FIM 500cc World Championships, becoming the first competitor to win FIM world championships in all three engine displacement classes (125cc, 250cc and 500cc). His victory at the 1988 500cc United States Grand Prix marked the first time a European competitor had won the event since Håkan Carlqvist in 1983. His performance earned him the 1988 Belgian National Sports Merit Award and he was named the 1988 Belgian Sportsman of the year.

The 1989 500cc Motocross World Championship once again featured Honda teammates Geboers and Thorpe as the top challengers for the title. The points lead went back and forth between the two teammates during the early rounds until Geboers surged to a 29-point lead at mid-season and seemed poised to win the championship. However, Thorpe would re-motivate himself during the second half of the season and won the last four races of the year to overtake Geboers and claim the 500cc World Championship.

At the age of 28, Geboers retired at the top of his sport in 1990 by winning the premier 500cc world championship in his final season of competition. After early championship points leader Billy Liles (Kawasaki) was sidelined by an injury, Geboers went on to dominate the second half of the season to clinch his fifth World Championship, joining other five-time World Champions Joël Robert (6 250cc titles) and Roger De Coster (5 500cc titles). He won the final race of his career at the 1990 500cc United States Grand Prix, defeating American riders Ricky Johnson, Jeff Matiasevich, and Johnny O'Mara.

Geboers also won the Le Touquet beach race three consecutive times between 1988 and 1990.

== Career overview ==
Geboers won 74 individual heat races (34-125cc, 9-250cc, 31-500cc) and 39 Grand Prix victories (18-125cc, 5-250cc, 16-500cc) during his world championship racing career. He won two 500cc World Championships (1988, 1990), one 250cc World Championship (1987) and two 125cc World Championships (1982, 1983). He also won three 500cc Belgian motocross national championaships (1986-1988). He was a member of six Belgian Motocross des Nations teams (1981, 1983, 1985-1987, 1989) and two Trophée des Nations teams (1981, 1983).

== Later life ==
After his retirement from motocross racing, Geboers began a career in sports car endurance racing, competing in the 2001 and 2002 FIA GT Championship in events such as the 2001 FIA GT Jarama 500km and the Spa 24 Hours in 2001 and 2002. Geboers managed the Suzuki motocross team along with his brother, fielding Belgian riders Clement Desalle and Kevin Strijbos.

== Death ==
Geboers died on May 6, 2018, in a drowning accident on a lake in Mol, Belgium after jumping off a boat to save his pet dog. Geboers immediately had difficulty and failed to surface. Rescue crews recovered his body the next day. The dog, a recent gift from his wife, reportedly survived.

== Honours and awards ==
- Belgian Sportsman of the year: 1988
- Belgian National Sports Merit Award: 1988
- First "Mr. 875cc" (winning world titles in 125/250/500cc): 1988.
- FIM Motocross Legend Trophy: 2011

== Motocross Grand Prix Results ==
Points system from 1969 to 1983:

Position	1	2	3	4	5	6	7	8	9	10
Points	15	12	10	8	6	5	4	3	2	1

Points system from 1984:

Position	1st	2nd	3rd	4th	5th	6th	7th	8th	9th	10th	11th	12th	13th	14th	15th
Points	20	17	15	13	11	10	9	8	7	6	5	4	3	2	1

Year	Class	Team	1		2		3		4		5		6		7		8		9		10		11		12		Pos	Pts
Year	Class	Team	R1	R2	R1	R2	R1	R2	R1	R2	R1	R2	R1	R2	R1	R2	R1	R2	R1	R2	R1	R2	R1	R2	R1	R2	Pos	Pts
1980	125cc	Suzuki	NED -	NED -	AUT -	AUT -	BEL; 4	BEL; 5	FRA; 4	FRA; 1	YUG -	YUG -	GER; 1	GER; 2	ITA; 2	ITA -	CZE; 2	CZE; 1	FIN; 5	FIN; 2	USA -	USA -	ESP; 4	ESP -			3rd	129
1981	125cc	Suzuki	ITA -	ITA; 3	NED; 1	NED -	AUT -	AUT; 6	GER; 4	GER; 2	FRA; 1	FRA; 3	YUG; 5	YUG; 7	POL -	POL; 1	CH; 4	CH; 3	USA -	USA; 6	FIN; 1	FIN; 3	CZE; 3	CZE; 2	ESP; 2	ESP; 1	2nd	197
1982	125cc	Suzuki	NED; 4	NED; 1	BEL; 9	BEL; 8	AUT; 1	AUT -	ITA; 1	ITA; 1	YUG -	YUG; 3	CH; 2	CH; 2	CZE; 1	CZE; 2	FRA; 1	FRA; 1	GER; 2	GER; 1	FIN; 5	FIN; 1	SWE; 2	SWE; 1	ESP; 2	ESP; 1	1st	266
1983	125cc	Suzuki	NED; 1	NED; 1	AUT; 1	AUT; 1	ITA; 2	ITA; 2	BEL; 1	BEL; 1	FRA; 1	FRA; 1	YUG; 1	YUG; 1	GER -	GER; 1	ESP -	ESP -	URS; 1	URS; 3	SWE; 4	SWE; 1	FIN; 4	FIN; 4	CZE; 1	CZE; 1	1st	283
1984	500cc	Honda	AUT; 1	AUT; 4	CH; 5	CH; 5	ESP; 2	ESP; 3	FRA; 2	FRA; 3	SWE -	SWE; 2	GER; 5	GER; 1	NED; 1	NED; 1	USA; 6	USA; 3	CAN -	CAN; 4	UK -	UK -	BEL -	BEL -	ITA -	ITA -	5th	245
1985	500cc	Honda	AUT; 11	AUT; 6	FRA; 4	FRA; 3	SWE; 1	SWE; 1	FIN; 2	FIN; 1	ITA; 2	ITA; 4	ESP; 3	ESP -	NED -	NED -	USA; 7	USA; 5	UK; 11	UK; 7	BEL -	BEL -	LUX -	LUX -	CH; 4	CH; 3	3rd	227
1986	500cc	Honda	CH -	CH -	AUT; 10	AUT; 13	NED; 3	NED; 4	SWE; 5	SWE; 5	FIN; 1	FIN; 1	GER; 5	GER; 5	CAN; 2	CAN; 2	USA; 7	USA; 5	FRA; 2	FRA; 3	UK; 2	UK; 1	BEL; 2	BEL; 2	LUX; 5	LUX; 6	3rd	299
1987	250cc	Honda	BEL; 4	BEL; 2	POR; 1	POR; 1	UK -	UK; 1	NED; 2	NED; 1	CZE; 2	CZE; 1	YUG; 5	YUG; 6	SM; 4	SM; 1	FRA; 1	FRA; 2	USA; 5	USA; 2	BRA; 4	BRA; 2	ARG; 4	ARG; 3	SWE; 1	SWE; 1	1st	381
1988	500cc	Honda	AUT; 14	AUT; 6	CH; 5	CH; 9	SWE; 4	SWE; 1	FIN; 1	FIN; 1	GER; 1	GER; 1	ITA; 1	ITA; 4	USA; 3	USA; 2	UK; 2	UK; 2	NED; 1	NED; 2	SM; 4	SM; 1	BEL; 5	BEL; 6	LUX -	LUX -	1st	333
1989	500cc	Honda	NED; 2	NED; 6	FRA; 1	FRA; 5	AUT; 3	AUT; 6	ITA; 1	ITA; 2	FIN; 13	FIN; 2	SWE; 4	SWE; 6	USA; 2	USA; 3	SM; 15	SM; 3	UK; 9	UK; 4	BEL; 3	BEL; 2	LUX; 6	LUX -	SWE -	SWE; 10	3rd	279
1990	500cc	Honda	NED; 5	NED; 5	CH; 5	CH; 3	AUT; 2	AUT; 4	FRA; 1	FRA; 5	FIN; 1	FIN; 1	ITA; 1	ITA; 1	UK; 1	UK; 1	GER; 2	GER; 4	SM; 1	SM; 1	BEL; 5	BEL; 1	LUX; 2	LUX; 7	USA; 1	USA; 2	1st	393
