= Georges Jobé =

Belgian motorcycle racer

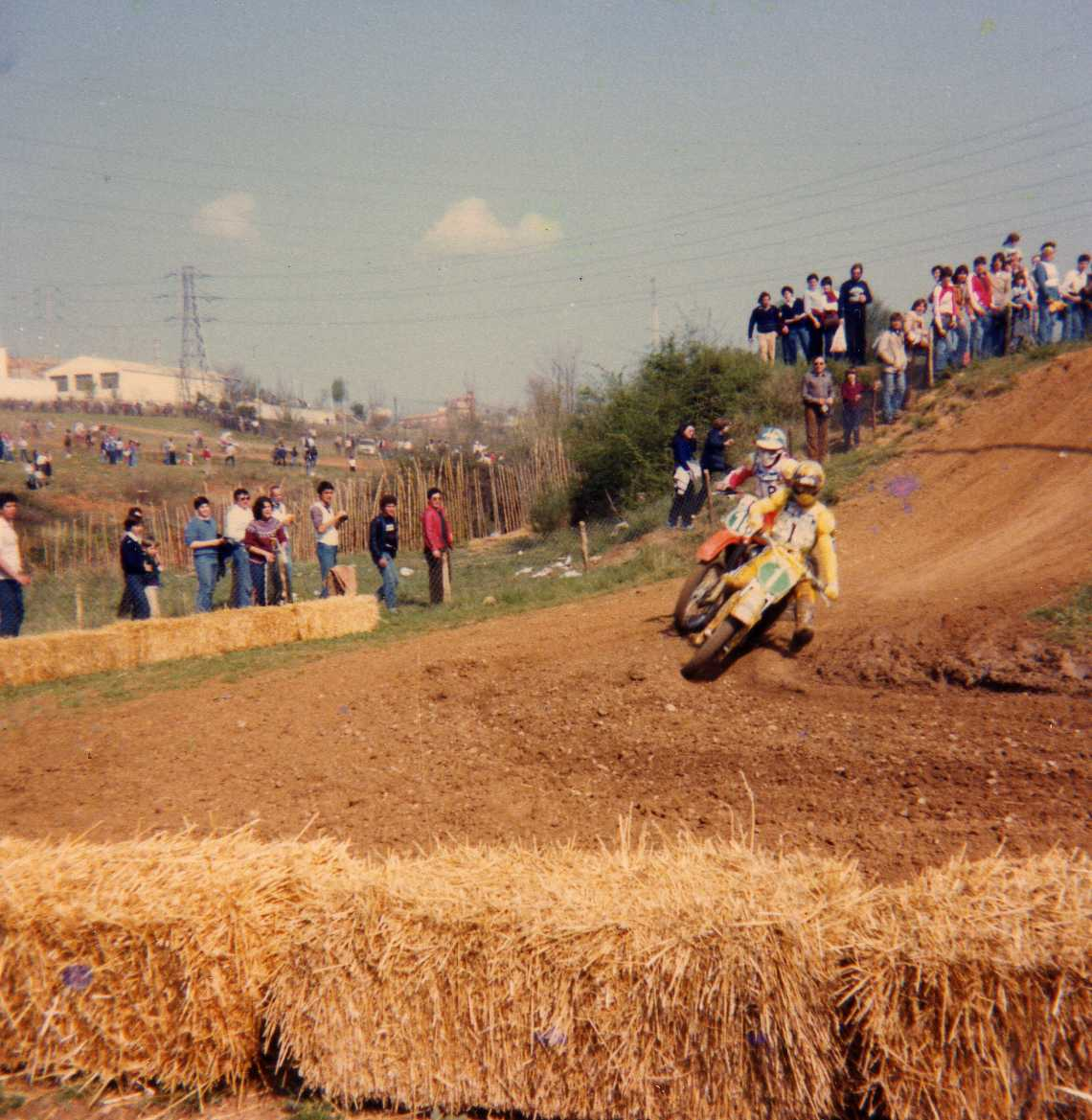
- George Jobé (1) on a Suzuki at the Vallès Circuit in 1981
- Nationality: Belgian
- Born: 6 January 1961 Retinne, Belgium
- Died: 19 December 2012 (aged 51) Brussels, Belgium

Motocross career
- Years active: 1979–1994
- Teams: Montesa, Suzuki, Kawasaki, Honda
- Championships: 250cc- 1980, 1983; 500cc- 1987, 1991, 1992
- Wins: 30

Georges Jobé (6 January 1961 – 19 December 2012) was a Belgian professional motocross racer. He competed in the FIM Motocross World Championships from 1979 to 1994. Jobé is notable for being a five-time FIM Motocross World Champion. He was named Belgian Sportsman of the year in 1987 and 1992.

== Motocross career ==
=== Early career ===
Jobé was born in Retinne, Belgium on 6 January 1961. His older brother Claude Jobé competed in the motocross world championships for the Montesa factory racing team in the early 1970s. Jobé entered his first motocross race when he was 10-years-old. He won the 1977 250cc Belgian junior motocross championship riding a Montesa.

=== Suzuki factory team ===
At the age of 18, Jobé joined the Suzuki racing team operated by former racer Sylvain Geboers. In his first year of international competition, he finished seventh in the 1979 250cc Motocross World Championship. Jobé won the 1980 250cc Motocross World Championship through sheer consistency. Eight different competitors won Grand Prix events during the season, however none of them were able to score points consistently to challenge Jobé. At 19 years, 6 months and 14 days, Jobé dethroned Joël Robert for the honorary title of youngest Motocross World Champion in history at the time. Jobé was the top individual points scorer at the 1980 Trophée des Nations as he led the Belgian team to victory in the team event. One week later at the 1980 Motocross des Nations event, he finished second to his Belgian teammate André Malherbe, helping the Belgian team to the overall victory.

Jobé led the 1981 250cc Motocross World Championship by 53 points over his closest rival, Neil Hudson (Yamaha) with four rounds remaining and appeared to be heading towards a second consecutive World Championship when he was injured while competing in a Belgian National Championship race. He attempted to compete in the penultimate round in Russia but was injured again, allowing Hudson to overtake him and win the World Championship by only two points in the final standings.

Jobé once again led the 250cc Motocross World Championship in 1982 when he suffered an elbow fracture at mid-season during the 250cc French Grand Prix. Danny LaPorte (Yamaha) then won three consecutive Grand Prix races to take the championship points lead from Jobé. The championship would not be decided until the last race of the season in Sweden where LaPorte finished ahead of Jobé by 13 points. Jobé began the 1983 250cc Motocross World Championship by winning five of the first six heat races to build a commanding 60-point lead. He then posted consistent results to maintain his points lead and clinch the title over LaPorte with two rounds remaining.

=== 500cc class ===
Suzuki's decision to withdraw from the Motocross World Championships at the end of the 1983 season due to a worldwide economic recession led Jobé to sign a contract to race for the Kawasaki factory racing team in the premier 500cc motocross world championship. The 1984 500cc Motocross World Championship featured one of the most talented field of competitors of the 1980s including all three of the previous year's world champions – Håkan Carlqvist (500cc), Jobé (250cc) and Eric Geboers (125cc). Jobé was challenged by the powerful Honda HRC team of Malherbe, David Thorpe and Geboers as well as Yamaha's defending 500cc World Champion Carlqvist. Jobé fought Malherbe and Geboers in a tight points battle that would not be decided until the last race of the season in Italy where Malherbe succeeded in maintaining his points lead and clinched his third 500cc Motocross World Championship by just 11 points over Jobé.

Jobé accomplished one of the most audacious passes in motocross history during the 1984 500cc British Motocross Grand Prix, held at Hawkstone Park, Shropshire, England. In 1984, the Hawkstone Park circuit included a large "double jump" (before they were customary on top motocross circuits). Few riders had the courage to attempt to clear the jump during practice, let alone during the actual race. However, during the second race of the Grand Prix, Jobé passed rival André Malherbe by clearing the double jump, physically jumping over his rival in the process. Photographer Nick Haskell captured the moment, and the image of Jobé flying over Malherbe with spectators cheering in the background, is considered by motorsports journalists to be one of the most iconic images of Grand Prix motocross racing.

Jobé represented Belgium at the 1984 International Six Days Trial (ISDT) in Holland. The International Six Days Trial, now known as the International Six Days Enduro, is a form of off-road motorcycle Olympics which is the oldest annual competition sanctioned by the FIM dating back to 1913.

Jobé dropped to fourth in the 1985 500cc Motocross World Championship as the powerful factory Honda team of Thorpe, Malherbe and Geboers swept the top three positions in the points standings. The 1986 500cc World Championship was a repeat of the previous season with Jobé facing off against the factory Honda trio in a season-long battle that wasn't decided until the final round. Jobé was the strongest competitor in the second half of the season, winning six of the last eight heat races. Entering the last race in Luxembourg, the four competitors were separated by only 20 points with Thorpe in first place holding a three-point lead over Malherbe with Geboers and Jobé close behind. Jobé won the final race however, Thorpe was able to score a second-place finish to clinch his second consecutive World Championship. Thorpe won the title with 316 points, while Jobe had 296 points to finish the season in fourth-place.

Thorpe began the 1987 500cc Motocross World Championship season with three consecutive victories in the Spanish, French and Austrian Grands Prix to take the championship points lead, however he then suffered an injury while competing in the British National Championship. Thorpe's injury allowed Jobé to take the championship points lead with four Grand Prix victories and claim his first 500cc World Championship by more than 50 points over second place Kurt Nicoll (KTM). Jobé's 1987 500cc championship was notable as he won riding a privateer Honda CR500. Most of his rivals were on the official works teams of Honda, Kawasaki or KTM.

Having won 250 and 500cc titles, Jobé competed in the 1988 125cc World Championship in an attempt to become the first competitor in history to win the "Triple Crown" (FIM 125, 250 and 500cc world titles). He was unsuccessful, as countryman Eric Geboers became the first to achieve the feat by winning the 500cc World championship in that same year (Geboers having previously won world 125 and 250cc titles).

Jobé suffered through two injury plagued seasons in 1989 and 1990 as Honda teammates Thorpe and Geboers dominated the 500cc World Championships. In the 1991 500cc Motocross World Championship, Jobé took the championship points lead at mid-season after early points leader Kurt Nicoll (KTM) withdrew due to injuries. Jobé then fought off a challenge from Jacky Martens (KTM) to win his second 500cc World Championship despite only winning one Grand Prix race all season.

The FIM introduced a new Grand Prix format for the 1991 500cc Motocross World Championship with three 25-minute heat races as opposed to the traditional format of two 45-minute heat races. Due to lack of financial support, Jobé had only planned to compete in a few Grand Prix races. However, after taking the early championship points lead he ended up competing in the entire series, battling Nicoll (KTM) and Billy Lilles (Honda) all the way to the final race of the season. Despite five Grand Prix victories by Nicoll compared to only two for Jobé, he was able to outscore Nicoll by a mere two points to secure his fifth World Championship.

Jobé joined Joël Robert, Roger De Coster and Eric Geboers as the only competitors at the time with five or more Motocross World Championships. Jobé rode a Honda in a selected few races during the 1992 and 1993 500cc World Championships. He competed in his final World Championship race at the 1993 500cc French Grand Prix at the age of 33.

== Career overview ==
Jobé won 57 individual heat races (28-250cc, 29-500cc) and 30 Grand Prix victories (17-250cc, 13 500cc) during his world championship racing career. He won two 250cc Motocross World Championships (1980, 1983) and three 500cc Motocross World Championships (1987, 1991, 1992). He was also a seven-time Belgian Motocross National Champion (1980-1984, 1988, 1989). Jobé was a member of eight Belgian Motocross des Nations teams (1980, 1982-1984, 1986-1987, 1989, 1992) and four Trophée des Nations teams (1980, 1982-1984).

== Later life ==
Jobé retired from competition after winning his fifth world championship in 1992. In 2006, he was signed by KTM to help start their racing program, coaching riders such as Mickaël Pichon, Sébastien Tortelli and Jonathan Barragán. In 2007, Jobé was coaching young riders in Dubai when he crashed and became paralyzed. After a period of rehabilitation, he was able to walk again however, in April 2011 he was diagnosed with leukemia. Jobé died from his illness in Brussels on 19 December 2012 at the age of 51.

== Motocross Grand Prix Results ==
Points system from 1969 to 1983:

Position	1	2	3	4	5	6	7	8	9	10
Points	15	12	10	8	6	5	4	3	2	1

Points system from 1984:

Position	1st	2nd	3rd	4th	5th	6th	7th	8th	9th	10th	11th	12th	13th	14th	15th
Points	20	17	15	13	11	10	9	8	7	6	5	4	3	2	1

Year	Class	Team	1		2		3		4		5		6		7		8		9		10		11		12		Pos	Pts
Year	Class	Team	R1	R2	R1	R2	R1	R2	R1	R2	R1	R2	R1	R2	R1	R2	R1	R2	R1	R2	R1	R2	R1	R2	R1	R2	Pos	Pts
1979	250cc	Suzuki	ESP -	ESP -	NED -	NED; 8	ITA; 9	ITA -	BEL -	BEL; 5	YUG; 6	YUG; 8	CZE -	CZE; 3	POL; 7	POL; 2	FRA; 3	FRA -	FIN; 4	FIN -	USA; 9	USA -	GER; 9	GER -	BUL; 9	BUL; 9	7th	71
1980	250cc	Suzuki	ESP; 4	ESP; 4	CZE; 4	CZE; 3	GER -	GER; 2	BEL; 1	BEL; 1	POL; 4	POL; 3	USR; 4	USR; 2	UK; 2	UK; 1	FRA; 3	FRA; 3	NED; 3	NED; 4	USA; 2	USA; 2	FIN -	FIN; 8	SWE; 2	SWE -	1st	218
1981	250cc	Suzuki	FRA; 5	FRA; 2	ESP; 1	ESP; 1	AUT; 4	AUT; 1	ITA; 1	ITA; 1	CZE; 1	CZE; 1	BUL; 5	BUL; 1	CH; 1	CH; 1	UK; 2	UK -	GER; 2	GER; 1	USA -	USA -	USR; 2	USR -	NED -	NED -	2nd	233
1982	250cc	Suzuki	CH; 1	CH; 1	ESP; 5	ESP; 2	BEL; 1	BEL; 2	CZE; 1	CZE -	ITA; 3	ITA; 4	FRA -	FRA -	UK; 4	UK -	NED; 2	NED; 2	USR; 2	USR; 1	USA; 5	USA; 5	FIN; 2	FIN; 2	SWE; 2	SWE; 3	2nd	225
1983	250cc	Suzuki	ESP; 1	ESP; 2	FRA; 1	FRA; 1	ITA -	ITA -	NED; 1	NED; 1	BUL; 1	BUL; 2	GER; 4	GER; 1	UK; 1	UK; 2	CAN; 2	CAN; 2	USA; 3	USA; 4	CH; 2	CH; 4	SWE; 4	SWE -	FIN; 1	FIN -	1st	249
1984	500cc	Kawasaki	AUT; 3	AUT; 1	CH; 2	CH; 1	ESP; 5	ESP; 4	FRA; 3	FRA; 4	SWE; 2	SWE; 3	GER; 3	GER; 4	NED; 3	NED; 3	USA -	USA; 7	CAN; 1	CAN; 1	UK; 2	UK; 3	BEL; 4	BEL; 2	ITA; 2	ITA; 2	2nd	359
1985	500cc	Kawasaki	AUT; 7	AUT; 9	FRA -	FRA; 10	SWE; 3	SWE -	FIN; 9	FIN; 3	ITA -	ITA; 3	ESP; 2	ESP; 2	NED; 3	NED; 2	USA; 3	USA; 3	UK -	UK; 3	BEL; 3	BEL -	LUX -	LUX -	CH; 5	CH; 4	4th	224
1986	500cc	Kawasaki	CH -	CH -	AUT; 9	AUT; 3	NED; 1	NED -	SWE -	SWE -	FIN; 6	FIN; 3	GER; 2	GER; 2	CAN; 5	CAN; 3	USA; 8	USA; 7	FRA; 1	FRA; 1	UK; 1	UK; 2	BEL; 1	BEL; 1	LUX; 3	LUX; 1	4th	296
1987	500cc	Honda	ESP; 14	ESP; 3	FRA; 2	FRA; 12	AUT; 6	AUT; 4	FIN; 3	FIN; 1	SWE; 8	SWE; 5	GER; 1	GER; 1	ITA; 2	ITA; 1	UK; 2	UK; 1	NED; 5	NED; 1	BEL; 1	BEL -	LUX; 5	LUX; 4	CH -	CH -	1st	304
1988	125cc	Honda	ITA; 12	ITA; 9	BEL; 5	BEL; 5	NED; 3	NED; 8	AUT -	AUT; 10	ESP; 9	ESP -	POR; 5	POR -	CZE; 4	CZE; 4	GER; 5	GER; 4	IRL -	IRL -	FRA; 14	FRA -	FIN -	FIN -	CH -	CH -	10th	132
1989	500cc	Honda	NED; 9	NED; 14	FRA; 5	FRA -	AUT -	AUT -	ITA; 7	ITA -	FIN; 2	FIN; 3	SWE; 3	SWE; 3	USA; 6	USA; 6	SM -	SM; 7	UK; 3	UK; 10	BEL -	BEL; 7	LUX -	LUX; 3	CH; 3	CH -	6th	180
1990	500cc	Yamaha	NED; 3	NED -	CH; 14	CH -	AUT -	AUT -	FRA; 9	FRA; 9	FIN; 10	FIN; 12	ITA; 12	ITA; 7	UK -	UK -	GER -	GER -	SM; 15	SM -	BEL; 8	BEL -	LUX; 9	LUX -	USA -	USA -	14th	70
1991	500cc	Honda	CH; 4	CH; 4	AUT -	AUT -	FIN; 8	FIN; 2	SWE; 4	SWE; 2	FRA; 2	FRA; 3	NED -	NED -	ITA; 1	ITA; 1	UK; 10	UK; 1	GER; 1	GER -	BEL; 3	BEL; 1	LUX; 3	LUX; 2	USA; 3	USA; 3	1st	296

Year	Class	Team	1			2			3			4			5			6			7			8			9			10			11			12			Pos	Pts
Year	Class	Team	R1	R2	R3	R1	R2	R3	R1	R2	R3	R1	R2	R3	R1	R2	R3	R1	R2	R3	R1	R2	R3	R1	R2	R3	R1	R2	R3	R1	R2	R3	R1	R2	R3	R1	R2	R3	Pos	Pts
1992	500cc	Honda	USA; 4	USA; 5	USA; 2	CZE; 3	CZE; 3	CZE; 3	AUT; 4	AUT; 1	AUT; 4	FIN; 3	FIN; 1	FIN; 2	SM; 4	SM; 8	SM; 5	GER; 3	GER; 1	GER; 1	UK; 2	UK; 3	UK; 3	FRA; 1	FRA; 2	FRA; 2	NED; 7	NED; 2	NED; 1	BEL -	BEL; 2	BEL; 2	LUX; 3	LUX; 3	LUX; 2	CH; 2	CH; 2	CH; 2	1st	550
1993	500cc	Honda	UK -	UK -	UK -	AUT -	AUT -	AUT -	SWE -	SWE -	SWE -	FIN -	FIN -	FIN -	ITA -	ITA -	ITA -	GER -	GER -	GER -	POR -	POR -	POR -	NED -	NED -	NED -	BEL -	BEL -	BEL -	LUX -	LUX -	LUX -	SLO -	SLO -	SLO -	CH; 7	CH -	CH; 6	31st	19

Year	Class	Team	1		2		3		4		5		6		7		8		9		10		11		12		Pos	Pts
Year	Class	Team	R1	R2	R1	R2	R1	R2	R1	R2	R1	R2	R1	R2	R1	R2	R1	R2	R1	R2	R1	R2	R1	R2	R1	R2	Pos	Pts
1994	500cc	Honda	CH; 10	CH; 7	AUT -	AUT -	IRL -	IRL -	UK -	UK -	ITA -	ITA -	SLO; 11	SLO; 6	NED -	NED -	FRA; 10	FRA; 3	POR -	POR -	LUX -	LUX -	BEL -	BEL -	GER -	GER -	21st	51
