= Brad Lackey =

American motorcycle racer (born 1953)

- Nationality: American
- Born: July 8, 1953 (age 73) Berkeley, California, U.S.

Motocross career
- Years active: 1970 - 1982
- Teams: ČZ, Kawasaki, Husqvarna, Honda, Suzuki
- Championships: 500cc - 1982
- Wins: 8

Brad Lackey (born July 8, 1953) is an American former professional motocross racer. He competed in the AMA Motocross Championships from 1970 to 1972 and, in the Motocross World Championships from 1973 to 1983. Lackey was notable for becoming the first and only American to win the 500cc motocross world championship in 1982. Nicknamed "Bad Brad", Lackey was inducted into the Motorcycle Hall of Fame in 1999 and, in 2013 he was inducted into the Motorsports Hall of Fame of America.

== Early career ==
Born in Berkeley, California, Lackey grew up in Pinole, California as the son of an avid motorcyclist. He grew up riding off-road motorcycles in the mountains around the San Francisco Bay area. He began racing motocross at the age of 13 and progressed to become an expert-ranked rider. By the age of 16, his racing success earned him sponsorship from Sprite Motorcycles, sold in America under the American Eagle brand. Early in his racing career, Lackey made a political statement during the Vietnam War by mounting a white plastic peace dove onto his motorcycle's handlebar.

Lackey's first racing success came when he rode a Sachs motorcycle to win the support class at a 1969 Inter-Am event near his home in northern California. The 1969 Inter-Am series featured visiting European professional racers such as Joël Robert and Torsten Hallman, who made an impression on Lackey with how much faster they were than their American counterparts. At that time, the sport of motocross was beginning to grow in popularity in the United States and, American motocross racers were not as advanced as the racers from Europe where the sport had originated. Despite his hippie style, Lackey was one of the first American motocross racers to learn about the importance of intense physical training necessary to compete at a world championship level.

In 1970, Lackey received sponsorship from a local ČZ dealer and in 1971, ČZ sent him to Czechoslovakia to enter a training camp to develop his physical fitness and riding abilities. While training in Czechoslovakia, he chose to live in a room with no heating or running water rather than live in the ČZ factory workers' dormitory. Lackey gained his first experience on the world championship motocross Grand Prix circuit when ČZ entered him into a few 250cc Grand Prix races while he was in Czechoslovakia.

Lackey returned to the United States and competed for ČZ in the 1971 AMA 500cc motocross national championship, finishing in second place just one point behind champion Mark Blackwell. While racing for ČZ, Lackey employed the engine tuning abilities of fellow racer and future AMA Motorcycle Hall of Fame member, Carl Cranke who was known for his ability to extract horsepower from two stroke engines.

Lackey began the 1972 AMA Motocross National Championship season winning four of the first seven races on a ČZ, at which point the Kawasaki factory offered Lackey a contract to race for them. He won his fifth race of the season on a Kawasaki and clinched the 1972 AMA 500cc 1972 AMA Motocross National Championship in dominating fashion.

Lackey also finished as the highest ranked American rider in the 1972 Trans-AMA motocross series. When the AMA showed no interest in sending an American team to the 1972 Motocross des Nations in Belgium, Lackey stepped in and persuaded Jim Pomeroy, Jimmy Weinert and Gary Jones to join him in the first-ever team to represent the United States at the event, where the team posted a seventh place result.

== World championship career ==
Kawasaki wanted Lackey to stay in America and defend his national championship however, after winning the national championship, he was determined to go to Europe to race against the best riders in the world in the world championship Grand Prix events. He became the first American competitor to make a long-term commitment by moving to Europe in pursuit of a motocross world championship. Few other American motocross racers were willing to negotiate the foreign languages and border crossings in Europe when they could make a comfortable living at home.

In the 1973 500cc motocross world championships, Lackey scored numerous top ten results and finished the season ranked 13th in the world but, he grew frustrated by his motorcycle's mechanical problems and Kawasaki's lack of support.

Before the 1974 season, Lackey accepted an offer to race for the Husqvarna factory racing team as Heikki Mikkola's teammate. Lackey continued to make progress in the 1974 season, placing third behind Roger De Coster and Mikkola in the second moto at the Italian Grand Prix. He improved to 10th in the season's final standings while his teammate Mikkola won the world championship. Lackey along with Jim Pomeroy, Jimmy Weinert and Tony DiStefano represented the United States at the 1974 Motocross des Nations event where they finished in an impressive second-place, due to Lackey and Pomeroy scoring fifth and sixth place results in the first moto. Their performance marked the best-ever result at the time for an American team at the event.

Lackey's experience continued to grow and in 1975, he won his first world championship race at the final race of the season in Luxembourg with a second moto victory over the eventual world champion De Coster. In 1976, he won another race along with four other podium positions and climbed another rung by improving to fifth in the world championship.

As motocross surged in popularity in the 1970s, the Honda factory entered the world championships in 1977 and hired Lackey to compete in the 500cc class. On July 3, 1977, almost one year after Pat Hennen won the 1976 Finnish Grand Prix to become the first American rider to win a 500cc road racing world championship Grand Prix, Lackey won the British Grand Prix to become the first American rider to score an overall victory in a 500cc motocross world championship Grand Prix. He improved once again, finishing the season ranked fourth in the world as he helped Honda develop their new motorcycle.

Lackey had his best world championship season to date 1978 however, Yamaha's Heikki Mikkola dominated the season with 14 moto victories in 24 races. Mikkola won the world championship with a record 299 points with Lackey finishing the season in second place ahead of five-time world champion De Coster, who was seriously injured in a pre-season training accident and had to have his spleen removed.

Kawasaki returned to the world championships in 1979 and rehired Lackey with the promise of a new motorcycle. Despite winning six motos, the season was marred by numerous mechanical issues as Kawasaki worked to develop the new motorcycle. Lackey dropped to fourth in the final championship points standing as, his former teammate, Graham Noyce claimed the world championship for the Honda team. Lackey later admitted that leaving the Honda team was the biggest mistake of his career, probably costing him the world championship in 1979.

Lackey returned with an improved Kawasaki motorcycle for the 1980 season and faced a strong field of competitors including the defending champion Noyce, five-time World Champion De Coster (Honda), and the 1979 250cc World Champion Håkan Carlqvist (Yamaha) as well as talented newcomers André Malherbe (Honda) and André Vromans (Yamaha). The season was dominated by Lackey and Malherbe as the two riders traded the top two positions in the points standings several times during a season-long battle for the 500cc World Championship. The championship wasn't decided until the final race of the year in Luxembourg with Malherbe holding a slim one-point lead in the championship. Lackey suffered two crashes in Luxembourg which allowed Malherbe to win the world championship with Lackey finishing in second place.

In 1981, Suzuki returned to Grand Prix motocross after a three year hiatus and offered Lackey a contract to race for them however, this meant he would have to develop a new motorcycle. He struggled through injuries and mechanical problems and dropped to sixth in the 1981 world championship.

In 1982, it would be a three-way competition between Lackey, his Suzuki teammate André Vromans and Honda's André Malherbe. Entering his 11th season of Grand Prix racing, the 29-year-old Lackey was considered to be past his prime by some motorsports journalists after his sixth place finish the year before. Malherbe won the season opening round in France but then failed to score points in the second round. Lackey took the championship points lead after winning the Austrian Grand Prix, but Malherbe responded with two consecutive victories in Italy and West Germany to close the points gap to just three-points at mid-season. However, Malherbe crashed and broke his leg at the 500cc United States Grand Prix which forced him to miss the rest of the season. After Malherbe's injury, Lackey and Vromans continued to battle for the championship points lead. Vromans scored a third-place result in the United States, then won three consecutive Grand Prix races to narrow the points lead to just four-points as the championship moved to the final race of the season in Luxembourg.

At the Luxembourg Grand Prix, Lackey came from behind to pass Vromans just before the end of the race to secure second place behind Hakan Carlqvist in the first heat race. At the start of the second race, Vromans took the lead but he forgot a first-lap detour right off the start and began climbing a hill that was used on every lap but the first. By the time he realized his mistake and turned around, he was in 17th place. Lackey finished the race in 3rd place to secure his first 500cc world championship. Lackey's victory also marked the first time an American competitor had won the 500cc Motocross World Championship.

After his world championship victory, Suzuki made the decision to scale back their racing efforts due to a worldwide economic recession and Lackey was left without a sponsor. Unable to secure sponsorship for the following season, he decided to retire after making one final appearance at the 1983 United States Motocross Grand Prix wearing the traditional number one number plate on his motorcycle signifying that he was the defending world champion.

Lackey won 21 individual heat races and eight Grand Prix victories during his world championship racing career. He won the 1972 500cc AMA Motocross National Championship and the 1982 500cc Motocross World Championship. He was a member of four American Motocross des Nations teams (1972, 1973, 1974, 1975) and one American Trophée des Nations team (1975).

Lackey was inducted into the Motorcycle Hall of Fame in 1999 and, in 2013 he was inducted into the Motorsports Hall of Fame of America. Today, Lackey continues his involvement in the sport of motocross taking part in vintage motocross racing.

== Motocross Grand Prix Results ==
Points system from 1969 to 1980:

Position	1	2	3	4	5	6	7	8	9	10
Points	15	12	10	8	6	5	4	3	2	1

Year	Class	Team	1		2		3		4		5		6		7		8		9		10		11		12		Pos	Pts
Year	Class	Team	R1	R2	R1	R2	R1	R2	R1	R2	R1	R2	R1	R2	R1	R2	R1	R2	R1	R2	R1	R2	R1	R2	R1	R2	Pos	Pts
1971	500cc	ČZ	ITA -	ITA -	AUT -	AUT -	SWE -	SWE -	FIN -	FIN -	CZE; 21	CZE; 15	USR -	USR -	GDR -	GDR -	UK -	UK -	GER -	GER -	BEL -	BEL -	LUX -	LUX -	NED -	NED -	-	0
1973	500cc	Kawasaki	FRA -	FRA; 8	AUT -	AUT -	FIN; 9	FIN -	ITA; 8	ITA; 8	CZE -	CZE; 7	USA; 10	USA; 6	GER -	GER -	BEL -	BEL -	LUX; 6	LUX -	NED -	NED -					13th	26
1974	500cc	Husqvarna	AUT -	AUT -	FRA; 10	FRA; 9	ITA -	ITA; 3	DEN -	DEN; 4	CZE -	CZE; 8	GER; 8	GER; 7	UK; 7	UK; 7	USA; 5	USA -	NED -	NED; 5	BEL -	BEL; 7	LUX; 8	LUX; 9			10th	57
1975	500cc	Husqvarna	CH; 5	CH; 4	ITA -	ITA -	FIN; 4	FIN; 6	USR; 4	USR; 7	FRA; 7	FRA; 5	USA; 2	USA -	CAN; 5	CAN -	UK; 9	UK -	GER; 7	GER -	NED; 5	NED -	BEL -	BEL; 4	LUX -	LUX; 1	6th	96
1976	500cc	Husqvarna	CH -	CH -	FRA -	FRA -	ITA; 4	ITA; 5	AUT -	AUT -	SWE -	SWE -	FIN; 1	FIN -	GER; 4	GER; 8	USA; 7	USA; 3	CAN; 3	CAN; 2	UK; 6	UK -	BEL; 3	BEL; 4	LUX -	LUX -	5th	99
1977	500cc	Honda	AUT -	AUT; 7	NED; 2	NED; 4	SWE; 1	SWE -	FIN; 3	FIN; 2	GER; 4	GER; 7	ITA -	ITA -	USA; 7	USA; 4	CAN; 3	CAN; 2	UK; 4	UK; 1	BEL; 3	BEL; 3	LUX; 4	LUX; 5	CH; 7	CH -	4th	168
1978	500cc	Honda	CH; 5	CH; 3	AUT; 1	AUT; 2	FRA; 1	FRA; 2	DEN; 2	DEN; 3	FIN; 2	FIN; 2	SWE -	SWE; 2	USA -	USA; 2	ITA; 1	ITA; 4	UK; 2	UK; 1	BEL; 2	BEL; 2	LUX -	LUX -	NED -	NED -	2nd	214
1979	500cc	Kawasaki	AUT; 5	AUT; 1	FRA; 3	FRA; 1	SWE; 1	SWE -	ITA; 4	ITA -	USA -	USA; 1	CAN; 4	CAN; 2	GER -	GER; 9	UK; 1	UK; 4	CH -	CH; 4	NED -	NED; 8	BEL; 9	BEL; 7	LUX; 1	LUX; 2	4th	173
1980	500cc	Kawasaki	CH; 2	CH; 2	AUT; 1	AUT; 1	FRA; 5	FRA; 2	SWE; 1	SWE; 3	FIN; 3	FIN; 3	ITA; 5	ITA; 6	NED -	NED; 2	USA; 6	USA -	CAN; 1	CAN; 4	GER; 2	GER; 2	BEL; 3	BEL; 2	LUX; 5	LUX; 10	2nd	221
1981	500cc	Suzuki	AUT -	AUT -	CH; 3	CH -	FIN; 6	FIN -	SWE; 7	SWE -	ITA -	ITA; 5	FRA; 2	FRA; 2	USA; 6	USA; 3	NED; 6	NED -	CZE; 6	CZE; 9	BEL -	BEL; 4	LUX -	LUX -			6th	99
1982	500cc	Suzuki	FRA; 2	FRA; 6	NED; 7	NED; 2	SWE; 3	SWE; 3	FIN; 8	FIN; 6	AUT; 3	AUT; 1	ITA; 5	ITA; 2	GER; 3	GER; 2	USA; 3	USA; 3	CAN; 1	CAN -	UK; 3	UK; 1	BEL; 2	BEL; 4	LUX; 2	LUX; 3	1st	228
1983	500cc	Yamaha	CH -	CH -	AUT -	AUT -	GER -	GER -	SWE -	SWE -	FIN -	FIN -	ITA -	ITA -	USA; 5	USA; 6	FRA -	FRA -	UK -	UK -	BEL -	BEL -	SM -	SM -	NED -	NED -	19th	11

== Motocross championships ==
- 1972 A.M.A. 500cc Motocross National Champion
- 1982 F.I.M. 500cc Motocross World Champion
- 2000 Over 40 AHRMA Champion

Preceded by André Malherbe	F.I.M. 500cc Motocross World Champion; 1982	Succeeded by Håkan Carlqvist
