= Graham Noyce =

English motocross racer (born 1957)

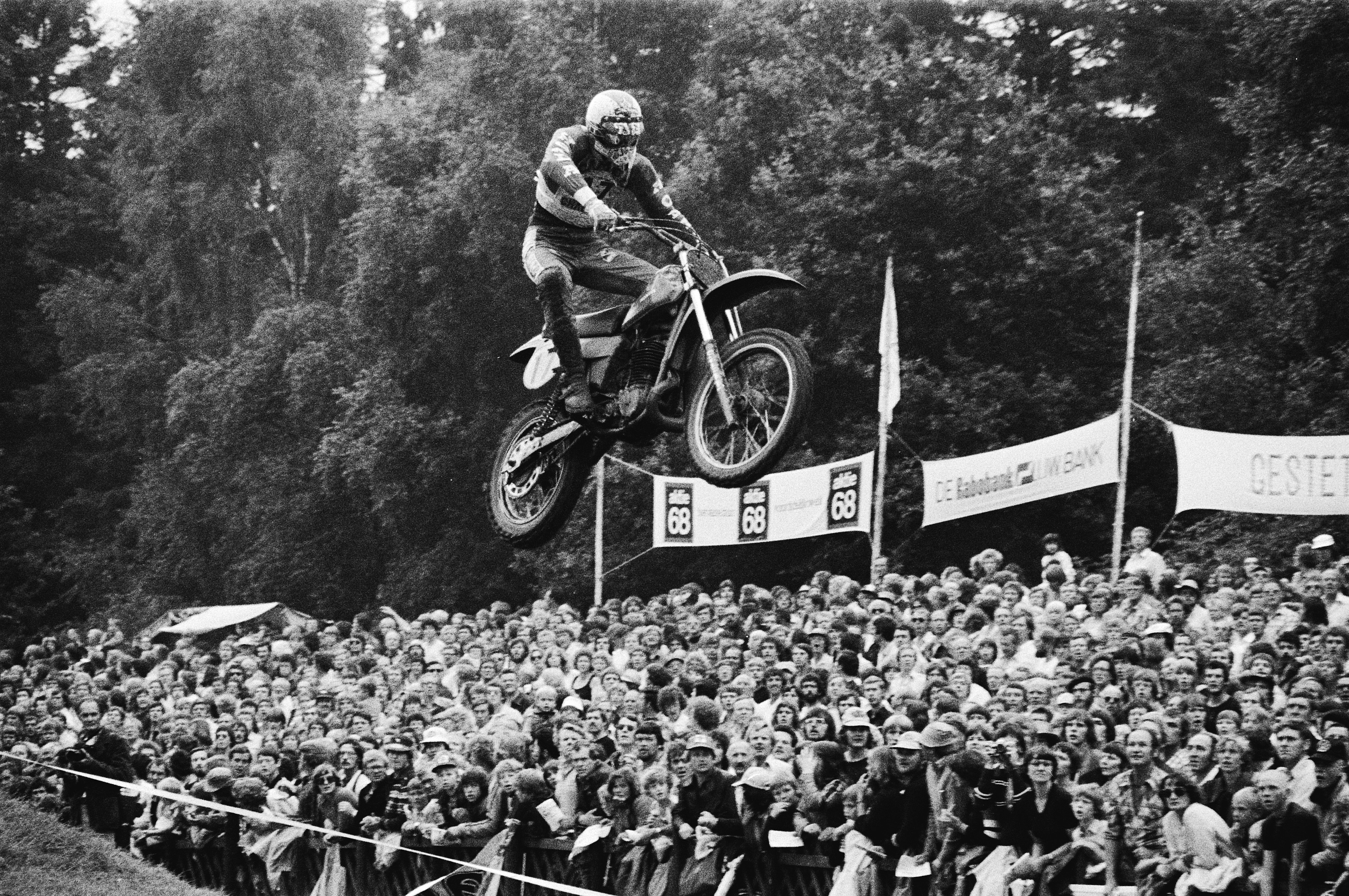
- Born: 18 February 1957 (age 69) Eastleigh, Hampshire, England

Motocross career
- Years active: 1975–1984
- Teams: Maico, Honda
- Championships: 500cc- 1979
- Wins: 6

Graham Noyce (born 18 February 1957) is an English former professional motocross racer. He competed in the Motocross World Championships from 1975 to 1984. Noyce was the 1979 500cc motocross world champion.

== Motocross career ==
Growing up in Fair Oak, Hampshire, England, Noyce was encouraged by his father to start riding motorcycles at the age of six. He won the British Schoolboy motocross championship at the age of 14 riding a 125cc Zündapp. Noyce left Wyvern County Secondary School at the age of 15 to become an apprentice tool maker for the Rickman brothers, noted British motorcycle frame builders. The Rickman brothers also provided him with a 250cc Montesa on which to compete.

After winning support races at the 1974 British motocross Grand Prix, Noyce was offered a contract to race for the Maico factory racing team. He competed in the 1975 British motocross championships for Maico however, when they refused to enter him into the World Championships, he accepted an offer from the British importer of Husqvarna Motorcycles to compete in the 1975 125cc Motocross World Championship. After competing in the opening rounds of the World Championship on a Husqvarna, he was sued for breach of contract by the Maico factory. A judge ruled that he must race for the Maico factory, but that Maico must provide him with competitive motorcycles. He finished the season aboard a Maico motorcycle ranked 17th in the 125cc motocross world championship.

He moved up to the premier 500cc class in 1976 and won his first Grand Prix heat race at the British motocross Grand Prix and finished the season ranked a respectable 4th place in the final world championship standings. Despite falling to eighth place in the 1977 world championship, his riding talent earned him a place on the Honda-HRC factory racing team for the 1978 season.

Noyce faced a strong field of competitors going into the 1979 season that included the defending World Champion Heikki Mikkola (Yamaha), five-time World Champion Roger De Coster (Suzuki), Gerrit Wolsink (Suzuki), Brad Lackey (Kawasaki) and his own Honda teammate André Malherbe. Mikkola had dominated the previous two seasons and was the overwhelming favorite to win the title until he suffered torn ligaments in his leg during pre-season practice. Mikkola's injury allowed his competitors to fill the void and six different competitors won Grand Prix races in 1979 (Noyce, Lackey, Wolsink, Mikkola, Bruno and Malherbe). Although Lackey won six heat races during the year, he struggled with his Kawasaki's lack of reliability.

Noyce won the season-opening 500cc Austrian Grand Prix then, at the fourth round in Italy, he took the championship points lead never to relinquish it. Although he won only one more Grand Prix at his home event in Great Britain, he was able to fend off a challenge by Wolsink by posting a string of consistent podium results to clinch the title at the penultimate Grand Prix in Belgium. He became the first British rider to win a 500cc Motocross World Championship since Jeff Smith in 1965.

Noyce won the 1980 500cc Finnish Grand Prix but then suffered a broken leg that forced him to withdraw from the championship to recover from his injury while his Honda teammate Malherbe won the World Championship. He returned in 1981 and fought a season-long duel with Malherbe as the two riders traded the top two positions in the points standings several times during the 500cc World Championship. The championship wasn't decided until the final race of the year in Luxembourg where Malherbe would prevail over Noyce to score his second consecutive World Championship.

Noyce won the 1982 500cc Swedish Grand Prix but failed to score points consistently and dropped to fourth place in the final points standings. In the 1983 500cc World Championship, Noyce won the season-opening Swiss Grand Prix, challenging Malherbe and Håkan Carlqvist (Yamaha) for the championship points lead until the halfway point where he began to fade. Carlqvist would win the World Championship with Malherbe and Noyce ending the season in second and third places. Noyce rode a KTM in the 1984 500cc World Championship finishing the season in 27th place. He competed in his final World Championship race at the 1985 500cc French Grand Prix at the age of 28.

Noyce won 14 individual heat races and 6 Grand Prix victories during his world championship racing career. He won one 500cc Motocross World Championship (1979) and won five British Motocross Championships (1976-1979, 1981). He was a member of six British Motocross des Nations teams (1975-1979, 1981) and seven Trophée des Nations teams (1975-1979, 1981-1982).

Noyce continues his involvement in the sport competing in vintage motocross events. He won the over 50 race at Polesworth in 2007 and competed at Farleigh Castle in July 2019.

== Motocross Grand Prix Results ==
Points system from 1969 to 1983:

| Position | 1 | 2 | 3 | 4 | 5 | 6 | 7 | 8 | 9 | 10 |
|---|---|---|---|---|---|---|---|---|---|---|
| Points | 15 | 12 | 10 | 8 | 6 | 5 | 4 | 3 | 2 | 1 |

Points system from 1984:

| Position | 1st | 2nd | 3rd | 4th | 5th | 6th | 7th | 8th | 9th | 10th | 11th | 12th | 13th | 14th | 15th |
|---|---|---|---|---|---|---|---|---|---|---|---|---|---|---|---|
| Points | 20 | 17 | 15 | 13 | 11 | 10 | 9 | 8 | 7 | 6 | 5 | 4 | 3 | 2 | 1 |

| Year | Class | Team | 1 | | 2 | | 3 | | 4 | | 5 | | 6 | | 7 | | 8 | | 9 | | 10 | | 11 | | 12 | | Pos | Pts |
| Year | Class | Team | R1 | R2 | R1 | R2 | R1 | R2 | R1 | R2 | R1 | R2 | R1 | R2 | R1 | R2 | R1 | R2 | R1 | R2 | R1 | R2 | R1 | R2 | R1 | R2 | Pos | Pts |
|---|---|---|---|---|---|---|---|---|---|---|---|---|---|---|---|---|---|---|---|---|---|---|---|---|---|---|---|---|
| 1975 | 125cc | Husqvarna | FRA; 5 | FRA - | UK; 7 | UK - | YUG - | YUG - | SWE - | SWE - | NED - | NED - | POL - | POL - | | | | | | | | | | | | | 17th | 13 |
| 1975 | 125cc | Maico | | | | | | | | | | | | | GER; 9 | GER - | CZE; 10 | CZE - | USA - | USA - | CAN - | CAN - | ESP - | ESP - | BEL - | BEL - | 17th | 13 |
| 1976 | 500cc | Maico | CH; 7 | CH; 3 | FRA - | FRA - | ITA; 3 | ITA - | AUT - | AUT; 2 | SWE; 6 | SWE - | FIN; 8 | FIN; 3 | GER - | GER; 2 | USA; 2 | USA - | CAN - | CAN; 3 | UK; 1 | UK - | BEL - | BEL - | LUX - | LUX - | 4th | 103 |
| 1977 | 250cc | Maico | ESP - | ESP - | CH - | CH - | BEL - | BEL - | CZE - | CZE - | ITA - | ITA - | AUT - | AUT - | USR - | USR - | YUG - | YUG - | GER - | GER - | UK; 10 | UK; 7 | SWE - | SWE - | FIN - | FIN - | 26th | 6 |
| 1977 | 500cc | Maico | AUT; 6 | AUT; 2 | NED; 4 | NED; 5 | SWE; 10 | SWE - | FIN - | FIN - | GER - | GER - | ITA - | ITA - | USA - | USA - | CAN - | CAN - | UK; 3 | UK - | BEL; 4 | BEL; 5 | LUX - | LUX - | CH; 4 | CH; 3 | 8th | 74 |
| 1978 | 500cc | Honda | CH; 6 | CH - | AUT - | AUT; 4 | FRA; 8 | FRA - | DEN; 9 | DEN - | FIN; 4 | FIN; 3 | SWE - | SWE; 5 | USA - | USA - | ITA - | ITA - | UK; 5 | UK; 2 | BEL - | BEL - | LUX; 4 | LUX; 2 | NED; 2 | NED - | 7th | 92 |
| 1979 | 500cc | Honda | AUT; 2 | AUT; 2 | FRA; 2 | FRA; 7 | SWE; 2 | SWE; 6 | ITA; 3 | ITA; 3 | USA; 3 | USA; 5 | CAN; 1 | CAN; 3 | GER; 6 | GER; 2 | UK; 2 | UK; 1 | CH; 2 | CH; 5 | NED; 1 | NED; 2 | BEL; 3 | BEL - | LUX; 4 | LUX - | 1st | 225 |
| 1980 | 500cc | Honda | CH - | CH - | AUT - | AUT - | FRA; 3 | FRA; 4 | SWE; 5 | SWE - | FIN; 1 | FIN; 4 | ITA; 4 | ITA - | NED - | NED - | USA - | USA - | CAN - | CAN - | GER - | GER - | BEL - | BEL - | LUX - | LUX - | 8th | 55 |
| 1981 | 500cc | Honda | AUT - | AUT; 5 | CH; 2 | CH - | FIN; 3 | FIN; 4 | SWE; 2 | SWE; 1 | ITA; 2 | ITA; 2 | FRA; 1 | FRA; 4 | USA; 3 | USA; 6 | UK; 3 | UK; 2 | NED; 1 | NED; 6 | CZE; 4 | CZE; 5 | BEL; 4 | BEL - | LUX; 3 | LUX; 4 | 2nd | 207 |
| 1982 | 500cc | Honda | FRA - | FRA; 3 | NED; 8 | NED; 6 | SWE; 1 | SWE; 1 | FIN - | FIN; 3 | AUT; 2 | AUT; 5 | ITA; 9 | ITA - | GER; 6 | GER; 6 | USA; 8 | USA - | CAN; 5 | CAN; 2 | UK; 4 | UK; 5 | BEL; 3 | BEL; 1 | LUX - | LUX - | 4th | 148 |
| 1983 | 500cc | Honda | CH; 2 | CH; 1 | AUT; 3 | AUT; 1 | GER; 4 | GER; 2 | SWE; 4 | SWE; 3 | FIN; 3 | FIN; 6 | ITA; 5 | ITA; 9 | USA; 7 | USA; 7 | FRA - | FRA - | UK; 7 | UK; 5 | BEL; 3 | BEL - | SM; 6 | SM; 2 | NED; 1 | NED - | 3rd | 173 |
| 1984 | 500cc | KTM | AUT - | AUT; 8 | CH - | CH - | ESP - | ESP - | FRA - | FRA - | SWE - | SWE - | GER; 11 | GER; 7 | NED - | NED - | USA - | USA - | CAN - | CAN - | UK - | UK - | BEL - | BEL - | ITA - | ITA - | 27th | 22 |

| Preceded by Heikki Mikkola | F.I.M. 500cc Motocross World Champion; 1979 | Succeeded by André Malherbe |
