= André Malherbe =

Belgian motorcycle racer (1956–2022)

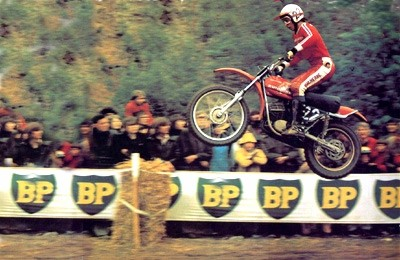
- Malherbe in 1974 aboard a 125cc Zündapp
- Nationality: Belgian
- Born: 21 March 1956 Huy, Belgium
- Died: 24 November 2022 (aged 66) Liège, Belgium

Motocross career
- Years active: 1975–1986
- Teams: Zündapp, KTM, Honda
- Championships: 500cc - 1980, 1981, 1984
- Wins: 39

André Malherbe (21 March 1956 – 24 November 2022) was a Belgian professional Grand Prix motocross racer. He competed in the Motocross World Championships from 1975 to 1986, most prominently as a member of the Honda factory racing team where he won three FIM 500cc Motocross World Championships. In 1984, Malherbe was named the recipient of the Belgian National Sports Merit Award.

== Racing career ==
=== Early racing ===
Born in Huy, the son of a motorcycle dealer, Malherbe began racing at an early age and earned his racing licence in 1973. He rode a Zündapp to win the 1973 FIM 125cc European motocross championship, and repeated as champion in 1974. In 1975, the FIM upgraded the 125cc European Championship to World Championship status. Despite winning two consecutive 125cc European titles, Malherbe failed to attract attention from larger motorcycle manufacturers so he continued to compete aboard a Zündapp in the 125cc class. He suffered an injury early in the year which forced him miss much of the season, yet still finished the year ranked seventh in the 1975 125cc World Championship.

=== KTM team member ===
In 1976, Malherbe signed a contract to race in the 250cc World Championship for the Belgian KTM importer and Grand Prix motocross racer Jaak van Velthoven. He won the first overall victory of his career at the 1977 250cc West German Grand Prix and, ended the season completing a KTM sweep of the 1977 250cc World Championship behind his Russian KTM teammates Gennady Moiseyev and Vladimir Kavinov. Malherbe ended the year helping the Belgian team win the 1977 500cc Motocross des Nations event held in Cognac, France and the 1977 250cc Trophée des Nations event in Markelo, Holland.

KTM entered Malherbe into the 500cc World Championship for the 1978 season. Malherbe was in fourth place in the championship after the first five rounds before the KTM factory suffered supply chain issues and struggled to provide Malherbe with enough spare parts as he finished the season as the highest scoring KTM rider in sixth place.

=== Honda factory team ===
Malherbe joined the Honda HRC factory racing team for the 1979 season to replace Brad Lackey who left to join the Kawasaki factory team. He won the final two Grand Prix races of the year and ended the season in third-place just one point behind runner up Gerrit Wolsink (Suzuki) as his Honda teammate Graham Noyce claimed the 500cc World Championship. He was a member of the Belgian team that won the 1979 Motocross des Nations event in Vantaa, Finland.

Malherbe faced a strong field of competitors in the 1980 season including the defending champion Noyce, five-time World Champion De Coster (Honda), Lackey (Kawasaki) and the 1979 250cc World Champion Håkan Carlqvist (Yamaha) as well as talented newcomer André Vromans (Yamaha). The season was dominated by Malherbe and Lackey as the two riders traded the top two positions in the points standing several times during a season-long battle for the 500cc World Championship. The championship wasn't decided until the final race of the year in Luxembourg with Malherbe holding a slim one-point lead in the championship. Lackey suffered two crashes in Luxembourg which allowed Malherbe to win the world championship with Lackey finishing in second place. Malherbe was also the top individual points scorer at the 1980 Motocross des Nations event where he led the Belgian team to victory.

Malherbe fought another season-long duel in 1981, this time with his Honda teammate Noyce who had missed most of the 1980 season with a broken leg. As in 1980, the championship wasn't decided until the final race in Luxembourg where Malherbe would prevail to score his second consecutive World Championship. The 1982 season saw a revival of Malherbe's rivalry with Lackey who was now riding for the Suzuki factory team. Malherbe won the season opening round in France, but then failed to score points in the second round. Lackey took the championship points lead after winning the Austrian Grand Prix, but Malherbe responded with two consecutive victories in Italy and West Germany to close the points gap to just three-points at mid-season. However, Malherbe crashed and broke his leg at the 500cc United States Grand Prix which forced him to miss the rest of the season. Lackey proceeded to claim the title to become the first American competitor to win a 500cc Motocross World Championship.

In the 1983 500cc World Championship, Malherbe's main competitors were his Honda teammate Noyce and the 1979 250cc World Champion Håkan Carlqvist riding for the Yamaha factory team. Lackey made the decision to retire after the Suzuki factory withdrew their team from the championship. Noyce faded in the second half of the season as Carlqvist and Malherbe continued to battle back and forth in one of the hardest fought championships in several years. Just as in the 1980 and 1981 seasons, the World Championship wasn't decided until the final race of the year in Holland where Carlqvist prevailed to win the World Championship by seven points over Malherbe.

The 1984 500cc Motocross World Championship featured one of the most talented field of competitors of the 1980s including all three of the previous year's world champions – Håkan Carlqvist (500cc), Georges Jobé (250cc) and Eric Geboers (125cc). Besides having to compete against the three defending World Champions Carlqvist (Yamaha), Jobé (Kawasaki) and Geboers (Honda), he also had to contend with his Honda teammates Noyce and newcomer David Thorpe. Thorpe won the first 500cc Grand Prix race of his career at the 1984 500cc Swedish Grand Prix to take the championship points lead however, he would be overtaken by Malherbe and Jobé. Malherbe scored points consistently, finishing on the podium in eight of the twelve rounds to claim his third and final World Championship ahead of Jobé. Thorpe showed he was a future championship contender by winning the final three Grand Prix races of the year.

The 1985 500cc Motocross World Championship was dominated by the Honda teammates Malherbe and Thorpe. Despite Malherbe winning five Grand Prix races, Thorpe was able to finish on the podium in all twelve Grand Prix races to claim his first 500cc Motocross World Championship ahead of Malherbe in second place and their Honda teammate Geboers in third place. The two competitors won 18 of the 24 rounds and eight of the 12 Grand Prix races.

The 1986 500cc Motocross World Championship saw the resumption of the rivalry between Malherbe and his Honda teammates Thorpe and Geboers as well as Jobé in a season-long battle that wasn't decided until the final round. Entering the final round in Luxembourg, the four competitors were separated by only 20 points with Thorpe in first place holding a three-point lead over Malherbe. Thorpe was able to score a second-place finish behind Jobé to clinch his second consecutive World Championship just five points ahead of Malherbe. Malherbe's victory at the 1986 500cc Canadian Grand Prix would mark the final victory of his motocross racing career. By the end of 1986, his relationship with the Honda team was at a low ebb, he had grown weary of motocross racing and made the decision to retire. He competed in his final World Championship race at the 1986 500cc Luxembourg Grand Prix at the age of 30.

== Career overview ==
Six times between 1980 and 1986, Malherbe went into the final race of the year with a mathematical chance of winning the 500cc world championship. He won three 500cc motocross world titles (1980, 1981, 1984) and was a three-time Vice Champion (1983, 1985, 1986). Malherbe won 72 individual heat races and 39 Grand Prix victories during his world championship career and also won four Belgian motocross national championships (1972, 1977, 1983, 1985). He was a member of two victorious Belgian Trophée des Nations teams (1977, 1980), and three victorious Belgian Motocross des Nations teams (1977, 1979, 1980). At the time of his retirement, Malherbe's 39 Grand Prix race victories placed him fourth on the all-time winners list.

== Later life ==
After his motocross career ended, Malherbe competed in auto racing. He drove in the French Formula Three championship with a best result being a 5th place at Spa-Francorchamps. He competed in the 1987 Spa 24 Hour round of the World Touring Car Championship. He then began to compete in rally raids riding for the French Yamaha importer, Sonauto. During the 1988 Paris–Dakar Rally while racing his motorcycle in the Algerian desert near Tamanrasset, he crashed and suffered a spinal cord injury. His remote location delayed medical assistance allowing a hematoma to form after the vertebral fracture leaving him a quadriplegic for the remainder of his life. He was supported with his disabilities by a tight-knit group of family and friends.

Malherbe died on 24 November 2022 at Liège hospital, Belgium, at the age of 66.

== Motocross Grand Prix Results ==
Points system from 1969 to 1983:

Position	1	2	3	4	5	6	7	8	9	10
Points	15	12	10	8	6	5	4	3	2	1

Points system from 1984:

Position	1st	2nd	3rd	4th	5th	6th	7th	8th	9th	10th	11th	12th	13th	14th	15th
Points	20	17	15	13	11	10	9	8	7	6	5	4	3	2	1

Denotes European motocross championship only.

Year	Class	Team	1		2		3		4		5		6		7		8		9		10		11		12		13		14		15		Pos	Pts
Year	Class	Team	R1	R2	R1	R2	R1	R2	R1	R2	R1	R2	R1	R2	R1	R2	R1	R2	R1	R2	R1	R2	R1	R2	R1	R2	R1	R2	R1	R2	R1	R2	Pos	Pts
1973	125cc	Zündapp	FRA; 1	FRA; 2	GER; 2	GER -	AUT; 2	AUT -	POR; 1	POR; 1	ESP; 1	ESP; 1	SM; 3	SM; 2	CH -	CH -	ITA; 1	ITA; 1	ESP; 1	YUG; 1	YUG; 2												1st	163
1974	125cc	Zündapp	ITA; 2	ITA; 1	FRA; 1	FRA; 1	CH; 5	CH; 2	GER -	GER; 3	BEL; 1	BEL; 1	NED; 3	NED; 1	SWE; 1	SWE; 1	FIN; 1	FIN; 1	YUG; 1	YUG -	POL -	POL -	AUT -	AUT -	CZE; 1	CZE; 1	ESP -	ESP -	USA -	USA -	UK -	UK -	1st	229
1975	125cc	Zündapp	FRA; 2	FRA -	UK; 2	UK; 2	YUG; 4	YUG -	SWE; 2	SWE -	NED -	NED -	POL -	POL -	GER -	GER -	CZE -	CZE -	USA -	USA -	CAN -	CAN -	ESP -	ESP -	BEL; 6	BEL; 4							7th	69
1976	250cc	KTM	ESP -	ESP -	BEL -	BEL -	CZE -	CZE -	POL -	POL -	USR -	USR -	YUG -	YUG; 7	ITA; 5	ITA; 5	FRA -	FRA -	UK; 9	UK; 6	GER; 3	GER -	NED -	NED -	SWE -	SWE -							14th	33
1977	250cc	KTM	ESP; 7	ESP; 4	CH -	CH -	BEL; 3	BEL; 8	CZE -	CZE; 7	ITA -	ITA; 7	AUT; 4	AUT; 3	USR; 6	USR; 4	YUG -	YUG; 2	GER; 3	GER; 2	UK -	UK; 2	SWE; 5	SWE; 3	FIN; 2	FIN; 2							3rd	150
1978	500cc	KTM	CH; 7	CH; 5	AUT; 6	AUT; 5	FRA; 3	FRA; 6	DEN; 5	DEN; 5	FIN; 3	FIN; 4	SWE -	SWE -	USA -	USA; 4	ITA; 4	ITA -	UK; 6	UK -	BEL; 5	BEL; 9	LUX; 7	LUX; 4	NED; 9	NED -							6th	109
1979	500cc	Honda	AUT; 6	AUT -	FRA; 5	FRA; 2	SWE; 6	SWE -	ITA; 5	ITA; 4	USA -	USA -	CAN; 5	CAN; 4	GER; 7	GER; 1	UK; 6	UK; 2	CH; 3	CH; 2	NED -	NED; 4	BEL; 2	BEL; 1	LUX; 2	LUX; 1							3rd	176
1980	500cc	Honda	CH; 1	CH; 1	AUT; 8	AUT; 5	FRA; 1	FRA; 1	SWE; 3	SWE; 2	FIN; 4	FIN; 1	ITA; 2	ITA; 1	NED; 2	NED; 7	USA -	USA -	CAN; 3	CAN; 1	GER -	GER; 8	BEL; 1	BEL; 1	LUX; 3	LUX; 3							1st	235
1981	500cc	Honda	AUT; 1	AUT; 1	CH; 4	CH; 2	FIN; 2	FIN; 2	SWE; 1	SWE -	ITA; 3	ITA; 1	FRA -	FRA; 3	USA -	USA; 2	UK -	UK; 7	NED; 2	NED; 2	CZE; 5	CZE; 4	BEL; 5	BEL; 1	LUX; 2	LUX; 8							1st	214
1982	500cc	Honda	FRA; 1	FRA; 1	NED -	NED -	SWE; 5	SWE; 2	FIN; 4	FIN -	AUT -	AUT; 4	ITA; 1	ITA; 1	GER; 2	GER; 1	USA -	USA -	CAN -	CAN -	UK -	UK -	BEL -	BEL -	LUX -	LUX -							5th	121
1983	500cc	Honda	CH; 1	CH; 2	AUT; 2	AUT; 3	GER; 1	GER; 1	SWE; 5	SWE; 7	FIN; 5	FIN; 1	ITA; 6	ITA; 1	USA; 6	USA; 5	FRA; 2	FRA; 1	UK; 3	UK; 2	BEL; 5	BEL; 1	SM; 1	SM; 7	NED; 4	NED; 1							2nd	253
1984	500cc	Honda	AUT; 7	AUT; 7	CH; 1	CH; 3	ESP; 1	ESP; 1	FRA; 1	FRA; 1	SWE; 1	SWE; 10	GER; 1	GER; 2	NED; 2	NED; 2	USA; 2	USA; 4	CAN; 2	CAN; 2	UK; 5	UK; 4	BEL; 2	BEL; 3	ITA; 4	ITA; 5							1st	370
1985	500cc	Honda	AUT; 1	AUT; 1	FRA; 2	FRA -	SWE; 4	SWE; 3	FIN; 1	FIN; 2	ITA -	ITA; 2	ESP; 1	ESP; 1	NED; 1	NED; 4	USA; 6	USA; 6	UK; 2	UK; 1	BEL; 1	BEL; 2	LUX; 2	LUX; 1	CH; 3	CH; 1							2nd	378
1986	500cc	Honda	CH -	CH -	AUT; 3	AUT; 1	NED; 4	NED; 2	SWE; 6	SWE; 2	FIN -	FIN; 4	GER; 1	GER; 3	CAN; 3	CAN; 1	USA; 5	USA; 4	FRA; 3	FRA; 4	UK; 5	UK; 7	BEL; 3	BEL; 3	LUX; 2	LUX; 2							2nd	311
