= 1970 Trans-AMA motocross series =

International motocross series

The 1970 Trans-AMA motocross series was an international race series established by the American Motorcyclist Association (AMA) as a pilot event to help establish motocross in the United States. The motocross series was an invitational based on a combined 250 and 500cc engine displacement formula, run on American tracks featuring some of the top competitors from the Motocross World Championships racing against the top American riders.

The success of the Inter-AM Motocross Series, promoted by the American importer of Husqvarna Motorcycles Edison Dye, prompted the AMA to take advantage of the sport's surging popularity by promoting their own motocross series, which they called the Trans-AMA series. While most of the established European competitors continued to race in the 1970 Inter-AM Motocross Series, the AMA negotiated a deal to bring over the BSA and Suzuki factory racing teams to compete in an eight-race series that ran throughout October and November of 1970. The series took place after the conclusion of the AMA Grand National Championship and several dirt track racers such as David Aldana, Dick Mann and Jim Rice would participate in the series.

The AMA adopted an odd points scoring structure that heavily favored consistency over winning, with first-place being awarded 300 points, while second-place earned 295 points and third-place 290 points. Despite six consecutive victories by Joël Robert (Suzuki), due to the odd points structure, BSA factory rider Dave Nicoll claimed the series championship without winning a single event by scoring points in every round. With his victory at the first round in La Rue, Ohio, Jeff Smith became the first rider in history to win an AMA-sanctioned professional motocross event. As a result of his being the highest placed American rider at fourth overall, Dick Burleson, was crowned the first-ever AMA Motocross National Champion.

== 1970 Trans-AMA rounds ==
Round	Date	Location	Overall Winner	Top American
1	11 October	La Rue, Ohio	(United Kingdom) Jeff Smith	Bob Thompson
2	18 October	Unadilla, New Berlin, New York	(United Kingdom) Jeff Smith	Peter Lamppu
3	25 October	Delta Motorsport Park, Delta, Ohio	(Belgium) Joël Robert	Brad Lackey
4	1 November	Franklin, Georgia	(Belgium) Joël Robert	Jimmy Weinert
5	8 November	Lewisville, Texas	(Belgium) Joël Robert	Brad Lackey
6	15 November	Saddleback Park, Irvine, California	(Belgium) Joël Robert	Billy Clements
7	22 November	Carlsbad Raceway, Carlsbad, CA	(Belgium) Joël Robert	Gary Bailey
8	29 November	Puyallup Raceway Park, Puyallup, Washington	(Belgium) Joël Robert	Sonny DeFeo

== 1970 Trans-AMA final standings ==
Pos	Rider	Machine	1	2	3	4	5	6	7	8	Pts
1	(United Kingdom) Dave Nicoll	BSA	3	4	2	3	6	6	6	5	4,550
2	(United Kingdom) John Banks	BSA	4	3	4	2	4	4	8	4	4,535
3	(United Kingdom) Jeff Smith	BSA	1	1	3	6	3		3	3	4,515
4	(United States) Dick Burleson	Husqvarna	8	8		10	8	9			3,925
5	(United States) Bryan Kenney	Husqvarna	7	7	9	9				9	3,760
6	(Sweden) Gunnar Lindström	Husqvarna	2		6		5	5	5	2	3,675
7	(Belgium) Joël Robert	Suzuki			1	1	1	1	1	1	3,590
8	(Sweden) Olle Petterson	Suzuki			7	4	2	2	4	10	3,360
9	(United Kingdom) Keith Hickman	BSA		2	5	5		3	7	6	3,350
10	(United States) Sonny DeFeo	ČZ				8	9			7	3,345
-	(United Kingdom) Malcolm Davis	AJS							2	8	-
-	(United States) Bob Thompson	Ossa	5	6							-
-	(United States) Jimmy Weinert	ČZ	6	9		7					-
-	(United States) Peter Lamppu	Montesa		5					10		-
-	(United States) Brad Lackey	ČZ			8		7				-
-	(United States) Billy Clements	Husqvarna						7			-
-	(United States) Gary Harris	Husqvarna						8			-
-	(United States) David Aldana	BSA	9								-
-	(United States) Gary Bailey	Greeves							9		-
-	(United States) Wyman Priddy	Bultaco	10								-
-	(Canada) Ron Keyes	ČZ		10							-
-	(United States) Doug Rodrigues	ČZ			10						-
-	(United States) Tom Rapp	Bultaco					10				-
-	(United States) Jim O'Neal	ČZ						10			-
Sources only document the points awarded to the first ten competitors. Sources:

== See also ==
- List of Trans-AMA motocross champions
- 1970 FIM Motocross World Championship
- 1970 Inter-AM Motocross Series
