= Harry Everts =

Belgian motorcycle racer

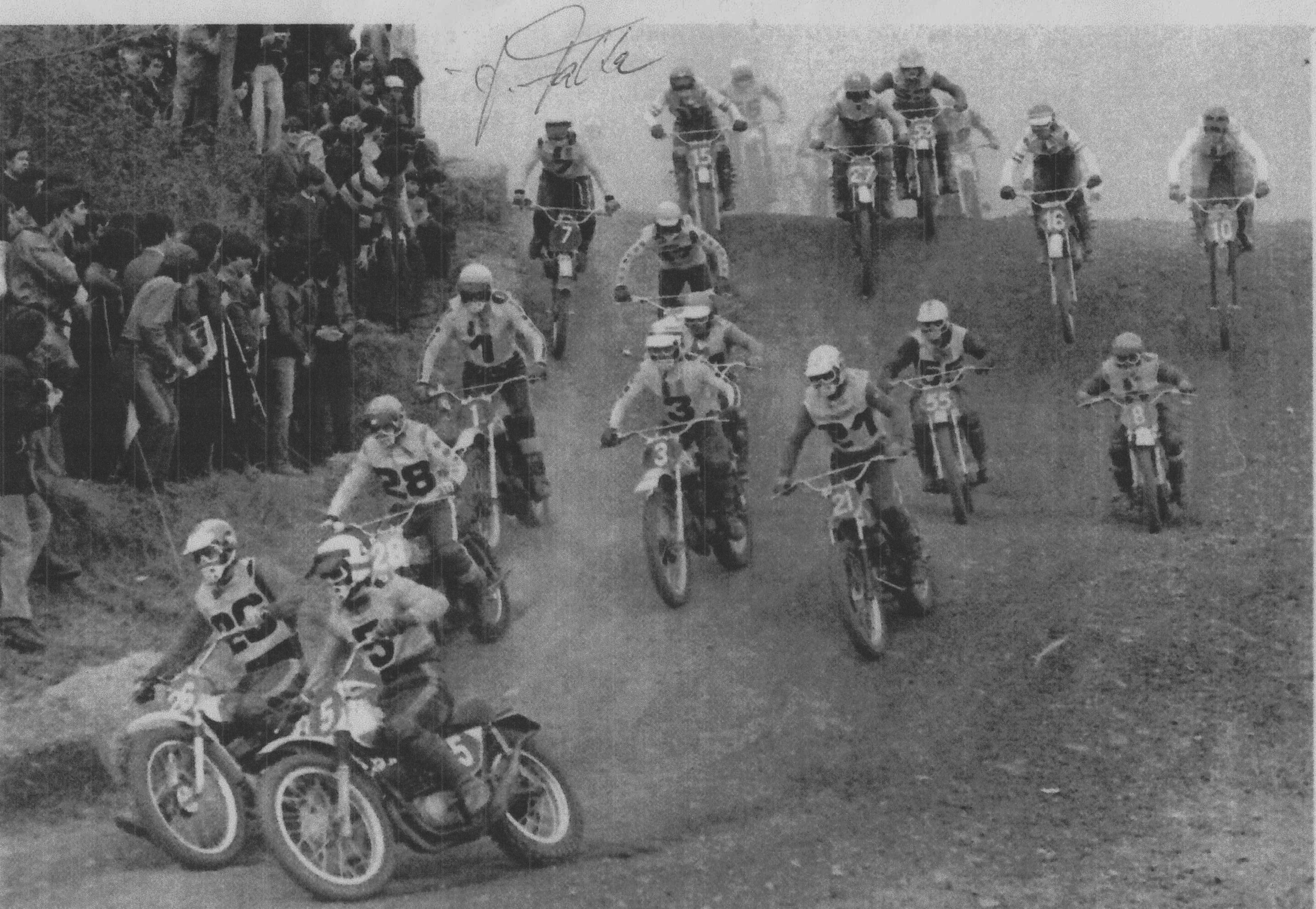
- MX Spanish GP 250cc 1973 race start
- Nationality: Belgian
- Born: 6 February 1952 (age 74) Maaseik, Belgium

Motocross career
- Years active: 1971 - 1983
- Teams: Puch, Bultaco, Suzuki
- Championships: 250cc - 1975; 125cc - 1979, 1980, 1981
- Wins: 26

Harry Everts (born 6 February 1952) is a Belgian former professional motocross racer. He competed in the Motocross World Championships from 1971 to 1983. Everts is notable for being a four-time FIM motocross world champion. In 2013, he was named an FIM Legend for his motorcycling achievements.

Everts is the nephew of former professional motocross racer Jef Teuwissen, the father of former ten-time motocross World Champion, Stefan Everts and the grandfather of professional motocross racer, Liam Everts.

== Motocross racing career ==
=== Early life ===
Everts was born on 6 February 1952 in Maaseik, Belgium where his father worked as a miner. Despite being born with polio and a severe limp, he began riding motorcycles at the age of 12. He grew up living next-door to his uncle, Jef Teeuwissen, a former Motocross World Championship competitor and a member of the victorious 1969 Belgian Motocross des Nations team. Spending time in his uncle's garage admiring his racing machines helped to spark Everts' interest in motorcycles and racing. With his uncle's assistance he began his motocross racing career.

=== Puch sponsorship ===
At the age of 15, Everts won the 1967 Belgian Junior Motocross Championship, but he was stripped of the title when it was discovered that he had falsified the documents to obtain his racing license (16 was the minimum age allowed). In 1970, he received sponsorship from the Puch factory on the recommendation of six-time World Champion, Joël Robert. At the age of 21, he competed in the 1973 Belgian Motocross Championship along with a few 250cc World Championship events as Puch's second rider in support of Uno Palm. He injured his ankle in the middle of the season and ended the season ranked 14th in the 1973 250cc World Championship.

When Palm returned to the Husqvarna team in 1974, Everts became Puch's principal rider. In his first full World Championship season, Everts scored points consistently and won two Grand Prix events in Finland and Switzerland to finish the year ranked third in the 1974 250cc Motocross World Championship behind Gennady Moiseyev (KTM) and Jaroslav Falta (ČZ). Everts was a member of the victorious Belgian team at the 1974 Trophée des Nations event in Vesoul, France on 1 September. The win marked the first of five consecutive Trophée des Nations victories for the Belgian team that included Everts as a team member. After the world championship season ended, he participated in the 1974 Trans-AMA motocross series in the United States. The Trans-AMA was an international series established by the American Motorcyclist Association as a pilot event to help establish motocross in the United States. Everts defeated Roger De Coster to win Round 6 in Puyallup, Washington and finished the series in fifth place.

In 1975, Everts won four Grands Prix (Spain, Czechoslovakia, UK and Finland), finished second four times and claimed the 250cc World Championship ahead of Håkan Andersson (Yamaha) and Willy Bauer (Suzuki). The 1975 season had 7 competitors win Grand Prix races and 10 competitors who won heat races as no one rider dominated the year. After they had claimed a Motocross World Championship, the Puch factory had no interest in further development of their motocross models and withdrew from competition. In 1976, Everts competed with minimal factory support to a fifth place in the 250cc World Championship. Everts was a member of victorious Belgian teams at both the Motocross des Nations and Trophée des Nations events in 1976.

=== Move to Bultaco team ===
Everts replaced Jim Pomeroy on the Bultaco factory team for the 1977 season and began the year with a series of strong performances including a victory in the first moto of the 250cc Swiss Grand Prix. He was lying in second place behind eventual World Champion, Gennady Moiseyev after four races, but then faltered to finish the season in fourth place. The 1978 FIM Championship began with a victory at the 250cc Spanish Grand Prix along with four podium finishes to put him in second place behind eventual World Champion, Moiseyev, but then missed three rounds, dropping him to sixth place in the season final classification.

=== Joining the Suzuki team ===
Everts then replaced Gaston Rahier on the Suzuki factory team competing in the 125cc Motocross World Championship. He experienced his greatest success in the 1979 season, starting the year off with three consecutive victories in Austria, Germany and the Netherlands. He dominated the season, winning nine of twelve Grand Prix events to claim the 125cc Motocross World Championship over his Suzuki teammate, Akira Watanabe. He also won the 1979 250cc Belgian Grand Prix, however he was excluded from the results as he was competing for the 125cc Motocross World Championship.

After dominating the 1979 season, Everts faced stronger opposition in the 1980 125cc Motocross World Championship from a trio of young riders. Marc Velkeneers (Yamaha) won two of the first three rounds to take the championship points lead with Everts in second place. Everts then suffered a broken wrist in France forcing him to miss three rounds while points leader Velkeneers suffered a broken leg in West Germany. Their absence allowed Michèle Rinaldi (TGM) and Eric Geboers (Suzuki) to narrow the points gap before Everts was able to return and win the Finnish and Spanish Grand Prix events to clinch the title at the last race of the season by 5 points over Rinaldi.

The 1981 125cc Motocross World Championship developed into a four-way battle between Everts, Rinaldi (Gilera), Eric Geboers (Suzuki), and Marc Velkeneers (Yamaha). After the first ten rounds of the championship the four competitors were 12 points apart but, Everts won the last two Grand Prix races of the year to claim his third consecutive 125cc Motocross World Championship ahead of his Suzuki teammate, Geboers.

After dropping to fourth in the 1982 125cc World Championship, Everts switched to the premier 500cc class for the 1983 season. He finished consistently on the podium including a victory over the eventual 1983 World Champion Håkan Carlqvist in the second heat race at the Swedish Grand Prix. He ended the season ranked a respectable fourth-place in the 1983 500cc Motocross World Championship, but then the Suzuki team made the decision to withdraw their team from the World Championships. Left without a motorcycle for the 1984 season, Everts signed a contract to ride for the Husqvarna factory team however, he suffered a broken leg during his first test ride with Husqvarna that ended his professional motocross career at the age of 33.

Everts won 48 individual races and 26 Grand Prix overall victories during his career in the Motocross World Championships. He was a member of two victorious Belgian teams at the Motocross des Nations (1976, 1979) and six victorious Trophée des Nations teams (1974-1978, 1980). He was also the top individual points scorer at the 1979 Motocross des Nations.

== Coaching career ==
In 1995, Everts began operating the Everts Motocross Training Camp in Benicàssim, Plana Alta, Spain. He has helped train young motocross racers such as Pauls Jonass and Motocross World Champion Jorge Prado.

== Motocross Grand Prix Results ==
Points system from 1969 to 1980:

Position	1	2	3	4	5	6	7	8	9	10
Points	15	12	10	8	6	5	4	3	2	1

(Results in italics indicate overall winner)

Year	Class	Team	1		2		3		4		5		6		7		8		9		10		11		12		Pos	Pts
Year	Class	Team	R1	R2	R1	R2	R1	R2	R1	R2	R1	R2	R1	R2	R1	R2	R1	R2	R1	R2	R1	R2	R1	R2	R1	R2	Pos	Pts
1971	250cc	Puch	ESP -	ESP -	CH -	CH -	POL -	POL -	GER -	GER -	YUG -	YUG -	ITA -	ITA -	NED -	NED -	GDR -	GDR -	FIN -	FIN -	SWE -	SWE -	UK -	UK -	AUT -	AUT; 11	30th	1
1972	250cc	Puch	ESP -	ESP -	FRA -	FRA -	NED -	NED -	CZE -	CZE -	YUG -	YUG -	GER -	GER -	POL; 11	POL; 9	USR -	USR -	FIN -	FIN -	SWE -	SWE -	UK -	UK -	CH -	CH -	28th	2
1973	250cc	Puch	ESP -	ESP -	ITA; 8	ITA; 9	BEL -	BEL; 9	CH; 7	CH; 7	POL -	POL -	YUG -	YUG -	FRA; 8	FRA -	FIN -	FIN -	USR -	USR -	SWE; 4	SWE -	AUT; 9	AUT; 9			14th	30
1974	250cc	Puch	ESP; 6	ESP; 2	ITA; 3	ITA; 7	CZE -	CZE; 4	POL; 4	POL -	YUG; 7	YUG -	UK; 1	UK; 4	GER; 10	GER; 5	NED; 3	NED; 4	FIN; 1	FIN; 4	SWE; 4	SWE -	CH; 1	CH; 1			3rd	132
1975	250cc	Puch	ESP; 2	ESP; 3	AUT; 3	AUT -	BEL; 5	BEL -	CZE -	CZE; 8	POL; 1	POL; 1	YUG; 7	YUG; 1	GER -	GER; 2	UK; 1	UK; 2	FRA; 7	FRA -	SWE; 5	SWE; 8	FIN; 2	FIN; 3	CH -	CH; 1	1st	159
1976	250cc	Puch	ESP; 9	ESP; 5	BEL; 3	BEL; 2	CZE -	CZE; 7	POL -	POL -	USR -	USR -	YUG -	YUG; 4	ITA -	ITA -	FRA -	FRA -	UK; 2	UK; 2	GER; 4	GER; 6	NED; 4	NED; 3	SWE; 8	SWE -	5th	98
1977	250cc	Bultaco	ESP; 5	ESP; 3	CH; 1	CH; 8	BEL; 2	BEL; 5	CZE; 3	CZE -	ITA; 2	ITA -	AUT; 8	AUT; 8	USR -	USR -	YUG; 6	YUG; 5	GER; 2	GER -	UK; 5	UK -	SWE; 2	SWE -	FIN -	FIN -	4th	121
1978	250cc	Bultaco	ESP; 1	ESP; 8	ITA -	ITA; 3	CZE; 2	CZE -	YUG; 2	YUG; 3	AUT; 5	AUT -	GER; 8	GER; 1	UK; 2	UK; 2	FRA -	FRA -	USA -	USA -	SWE -	SWE -	FIN; 4	FIN -	USR; 4	USR -	6th	126
1979	125cc	Suzuki	AUT; 1	AUT; 1	GER; 1	GER; 1	NED; 1	NED; 1	ITA; 2	ITA; 3	FIN; 1	FIN; 1	CZE; 1	CZE; 1	YUG; 2	YUG; 1	CH; 1	CH -	FRA; 1	FRA; 1	IRL; 1	IRL; 1	USA -	USA; 3	ESP; 1	ESP; 1	1st	314
1979	250cc	Suzuki	ESP -	ESP -	NED -	NED -	ITA -	ITA -	BEL; 1*	BEL; 1*	YUG -	YUG -	CZE -	CZE -	POL -	POL -	FRA -	FRA -	FIN -	FIN -	USA -	USA -	GER -	GER -	BUL -	BUL -	-	0
1980	125cc	Suzuki	NED; 1	NED; 2	AUT; 1	AUT -	BEL; 1	BEL; 3	FRA; 2	FRA; 7	YUG -	YUG -	GER -	GER -	ITA -	ITA -	CZE; 8	CZE -	FIN; 2	FIN; 1	USA; 7	USA -	ESP; 1	ESP; 1			1st	147
1981	125cc	Suzuki	ITA; 8	ITA -	NED; 2	NED; 3	AUT; 4	AUT; 1	GER; 2	GER; 4	FRA; 9	FRA -	YUG; 1	YUG; 1	POL; 2	POL; 4	CH; 7	CH -	USA; 5	USA; 5	FIN; 5	FIN; 2	CZE; 1	CZE; 1	ESP; 1	ESP; 2	1st	211
1982	125cc	Suzuki	NED; 2	NED -	BEL; 2	BEL; 5	AUT; 9	AUT; 4	ITA -	ITA; 5	YUG; 1	YUG; 2	CH; 4	CH; 8	CZE; 6	CZE -	FRA; 3	FRA; 3	GER -	GER; 3	FIN -	FIN; 5	SWE; 4	SWE -	ESP; 1	ESP; 2	4th	160
1983	500cc	Suzuki	CH; 5	CH -	AUT -	AUT; 10	GER -	GER -	SWE; 3	SWE; 1	FIN -	FIN; 3	ITA; 3	ITA; 4	USA -	USA; 9	FRA; 1	FRA; 9	UK; 2	UK; 3	BEL; 2	BEL; 3	SM; 2	SM; 3	NED -	NED -	4th	145
*Everts is invited to compete in the 1979 250cc Belgian Grand Prix which he wins the overall victory, however he is not awarded points since he is competing for the 1979 125cc World Championship. Sources:
