= 1977 FIM Motocross World Championship =

Motocross championship season

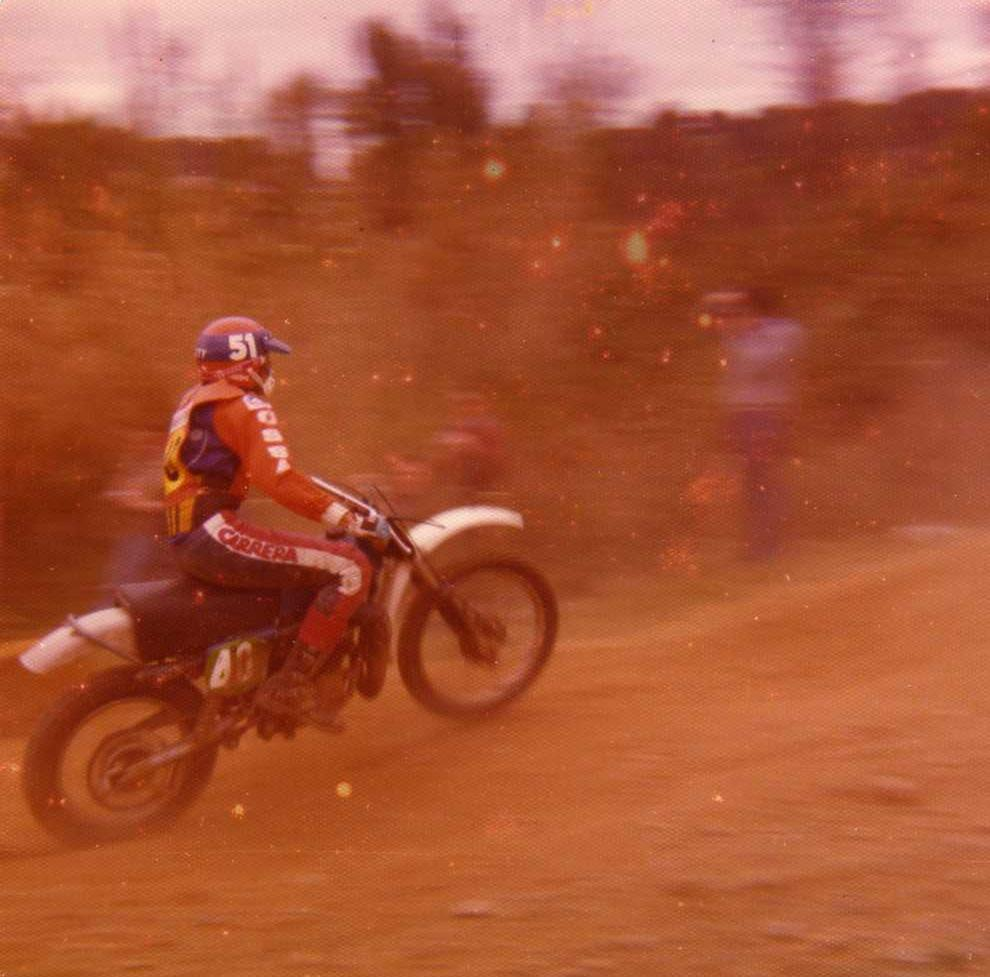
- Marty Moates at the 1977 250cc Spanish Grand Prix
- Organizer: FIM
- Duration: 3 April/28 August
- Number of races: 36
- Number of manufacturers: 19

Champions
- 500cc: (Finland) Heikki Mikkola
- 250cc: (Soviet Union) Gennady Moiseyev
- 125cc: (Belgium) Gaston Rahier

FIM Motocross World Championship
- ← 1976 1978 →

The 1977 FIM Motocross World Championship was the 21st F.I.M. Motocross Racing World Championship season.

== Summary ==
Heikki Mikkola rejoined the 500cc class in 1977 after winning the 1976 250cc world championship. Now riding for the Yamaha factory racing team, he continued his old rivalry with Suzuki's Roger De Coster. Mikkola won 12 motos to clinch the title ahead of Suzuki teammates De Coster and Gerrit Wolsink. Brad Lackey switched to the Honda racing team and became the first American to score an overall victory in a 500cc motocross world championship Grand Prix when he won the British Grand Prix.

Bengt Åberg competed in the 500cc world championship on a highly modified four stroke Yamaha XT500 built in collaboration with former world champions Torsten Hallman and Sten Lundin. Åberg rode the bike to a victory in the first moto of the 1977 500cc Luxembourg Grand Prix and ended the season ranked 9th in the final world championship standings. After five seasons racing in the 250cc class, Håkan Andersson competed in the 500cc class for Montesa and finished the season in fifth place.

Gennady Moiseyev won his second 250cc world championship as KTM swept the top three positions with Vladimir Kavinov finishing in second place and André Malherbe taking third place in the final standings. Suzuki's Gaston Rahier won the 125cc class for a third consecutive year. Daniel Péan became the first French rider to win an overall victory in an FIM Motocross Grand Prix race when he won the 250cc Yugoslav Grand Prix on 5 June 1977.

== Grands Prix ==
=== 500cc ===
Round	Date	Grand Prix	Location	Race 1 Winner	Race 2 Winner	Overall Winner	Report
1	April 17	(Austria) Austrian Grand Prix	Sittendorf	(Belgium) Roger De Coster	(Netherlands) Gerrit Wolsink	(Belgium) Roger De Coster	Report
2	May 8	(Netherlands) Dutch Grand Prix	Norg	(Finland) Heikki Mikkola	(Finland) Heikki Mikkola	(Finland) Heikki Mikkola	Report
3	May 15	(Sweden) Swedish Grand Prix	Edsbyn	(United States) Brad Lackey	(Finland) Heikki Mikkola	(Finland) Heikki Mikkola	Report
4	May 22	(Finland) Finnish Grand Prix	Ruskeasanta	(Finland) Heikki Mikkola	(Finland) Heikki Mikkola	(Finland) Heikki Mikkola	Report
5	June 5	(Germany) West German Grand Prix	Bielstein	(Finland) Heikki Mikkola	(Netherlands) Gerrit Wolsink	(Finland) Heikki Mikkola	Report
6	June 12	(Italy) Italian Grand Prix	Lombardore	(Finland) Heikki Mikkola	(Belgium) Roger De Coster	(Finland) Heikki Mikkola	Report
7	June 19	United States Grand Prix	Carlsbad	(United States) Jim Pomeroy	(Finland) Heikki Mikkola	(Netherlands) Gerrit Wolsink	Report
8	June 26	(Canada) Canadian Grand Prix	Mosport	(Finland) Heikki Mikkola	(Netherlands) Gerrit Wolsink	(Finland) Heikki Mikkola	Report
9	July 3	(United Kingdom) British Grand Prix	Farleigh Castle	(United States) Brad Lackey	(Finland) Heikki Mikkola	(United States) Brad Lackey	Report
10	August 7	(Belgium) Belgian Grand Prix	Namur	(Belgium) Roger De Coster	(Finland) Heikki Mikkola	(Finland) Heikki Mikkola	Report
11	August 14	Luxembourg Grand Prix	Ettelbruck	(Sweden) Bengt Åberg	(Finland) Heikki Mikkola	(Finland) Heikki Mikkola	Report
12	August 28	(Switzerland) Swiss Grand Prix	Wohlen	(Belgium) Jaak van Velthoven	(Belgium) Roger De Coster	(Belgium) Roger De Coster	Report

=== 250cc ===
Round	Date	Grand Prix	Location	Race 1 Winner	Race 2 Winner	Overall Winner	Report
1	April 3	(Spain) Spanish Grand Prix	Sabadell	(Belgium) Raymond Boven	(West Germany) Hans Maisch	(Belgium) Raymond Boven	Report
2	April 17	(Switzerland) Swiss Grand Prix	Payerne	(Soviet Union) Vladimir Kavinov	(Belgium) Raymond Boven	(Soviet Union) Gennady Moiseyev	Report
3	April 24	(Belgium) Belgian Grand Prix	Borgloon	(Soviet Union) Gennady Moiseyev	(Soviet Union) Gennady Moiseyev	(Soviet Union) Gennady Moiseyev	Report
4	April 30	(Czechoslovakia) Czechoslovak Grand Prix	Holice	(Czech Republic) Antonin Baborovski	(Czech Republic) Jaroslav Falta	(Czech Republic) Antonin Baborovski	Report
5	May 8	(Italy) Italian Grand Prix	Apiro	(Soviet Union) Gennady Moiseyev	(Soviet Union) Gennady Moiseyev	(Soviet Union) Gennady Moiseyev	Report
6	May 15	(Austria) Austrian Grand Prix	Schwanenstadt	(Soviet Union) Gennady Moiseyev	(Soviet Union) Vladimir Kavinov	(Japan) Torao Suzuki	Report
7	May 22	(Soviet Union) Russian Grand Prix	Chișinău	(Soviet Union) Gennady Moiseyev	(Soviet Union) Gennady Moiseyev	(Soviet Union) Gennady Moiseyev	Report
8	June 5	(Socialist Federal Republic of Yugoslavia) Yugoslav Grand Prix	Karlovac	(Soviet Union) Anatoly Ovchinnikov	(Czech Republic) Antonin Baborovski	(France) Daniel Péan	Report
9	June 19	(Germany) West German Grand Prix	Beuern	(Soviet Union) Gennady Moiseyev	(Soviet Union) Vladimir Kavinov	(Belgium) André Malherbe	Report
10	June 31	(United Kingdom) British Grand Prix	Hawkstone Park	(Soviet Union) Gennady Moiseyev	(Soviet Union) Gennady Moiseyev	(Soviet Union) Gennady Moiseyev	Report
11	August 14	(Sweden) Swedish Grand Prix	Uddevalla	(Soviet Union) Vladimir Kavinov	(Soviet Union) Vladimir Kavinov	(Soviet Union) Vladimir Kavinov	Report
12	August 21	(Finland) Finnish Grand Prix	Hyvinkää	(Soviet Union) Gennady Moiseyev	(Soviet Union) Gennady Moiseyev	(Soviet Union) Gennady Moiseyev	Report

=== 125cc ===
Round	Date	Grand Prix	Location	Race 1 Winner	Race 2 Winner	Overall Winner	Report
1	April 10	(France) French Grand Prix	Metz	(Belgium) Gaston Rahier	(Japan) Akira Watanabe	(Belgium) Gaston Rahier	Report
2	April 17	(Italy) Italian Grand Prix	Lovolo	(Belgium) Gaston Rahier	(Japan) Akira Watanabe	(Japan) Akira Watanabe	Report
3	May 1	(Belgium) Belgian Grand Prix	Retinne	(Belgium) Gaston Rahier	(Belgium) Gaston Rahier	(Belgium) Gaston Rahier	Report
4	May 30	(Denmark) Danish Grand Prix	Nissebjerget	(Netherlands) Gérard Rond	(Netherlands) Gérard Rond	(Netherlands) Gérard Rond	Report
5	June 5	(Poland) Polish Grand Prix	Szczecin	(Belgium) Gaston Rahier	(Netherlands) Gérard Rond	(Netherlands) Gérard Rond	Report
6	June 12	(Socialist Federal Republic of Yugoslavia) Yugoslav Grand Prix	Zabok	(Belgium) Gaston Rahier	(Belgium) Gaston Rahier	(Belgium) Gaston Rahier	Report
7	June 19	(Czechoslovakia) Czechoslovak Grand Prix	Dalečín	(Belgium) Gaston Rahier	(Netherlands) Gérard Rond	(Netherlands) Gérard Rond	Report
8	July 3	(Germany) West German Grand Prix	Schrecksbach	(Belgium) Gaston Rahier	(Belgium) Gaston Rahier	(Belgium) Gaston Rahier	Report
9	July 10	(Switzerland) Swiss Grand Prix	Roggenburg	(Belgium) Gaston Rahier	(Belgium) Gaston Rahier	(Belgium) Gaston Rahier	Report
10	July 17	United States Grand Prix	Lexington	(Netherlands) Gérard Rond	(Belgium) Gaston Rahier	(Belgium) Gaston Rahier	Report
11	July 24	(Canada) Canadian Grand Prix	Mosport	(Belgium) André Massant	(United States) Warren Reid	(Belgium) André Massant	Report
12	August 14	(Spain) Spanish Grand Prix	Montgai	(Belgium) Gaston Rahier	(Belgium) Gaston Rahier	(Belgium) Gaston Rahier	Report

== Final standings ==
Points are awarded based on the results of each individual heat race. The top 10 classified finishers in each heat race score points according to the following scale;

Position	1st	2nd	3rd	4th	5th	6th	7th	8th	9th	10th
Points	15	12	10	8	6	5	4	3	2	1

=== 500cc ===
(Results in italics indicate overall winner)

Pos	Rider	Machine	AUT (Austria)		NED (Netherlands)		SWE (Sweden)		FIN (Finland)		GER (West Germany)		ITA (Italy)		USA (United States)		CAN (Canada)		UK (United Kingdom)		BEL (Belgium)		LUX (Luxembourg)		CH (Switzerland)		Points
1	(Finland) Heikki Mikkola	Yamaha	3	5	1	1	2	1	1	1	1	2	1	2	4	1	1	3	1		2	1	3	1			272
2	(Belgium) Roger De Coster	Suzuki	1	3	3	3	3	3	4	5	2	3	4	1	2		2	4			1		2	2	2	1	222
3	(Netherlands) Gerrit Wolsink	Suzuki	7	1	5	2	8	2	2	3	6	1	2	4	3	2	5	1	8	2	9	2	6	6	5		202
4	(United States) Brad Lackey	Honda		7	2	4	1		3	2	4	7			7	4	3	2	4	1	3	3	4	5	7		168
5	(West Germany) Herbert Schmitz	Maico		9			4		7	6	5		3	8	9	5	4	6		4	5		9	7		5	85
5	(Sweden) Håkan Andersson	Montesa					9	4	6	8		4					6	9	5	6	7	6	5	4	3	4	85
7	(Belgium) Jaak van Velthoven	KTM	5	4	8		7	9			7	6	10	7		9	8	7	6	8					1	2	81
8	(United Kingdom) Graham Noyce	Maico	6	2	4	5	10												3		4	5			4	3	74
9	(Sweden) Bengt Åberg	Yamaha		8							3			3						3		7	1	3			72
10	(West Germany) Adolf Weil	Maico							9	7			9	6					10	5	6	4	7	8		6	45
11	(United Kingdom) John Banks	CCM			9				10			8	6	5		10	7	5	2			10					41
12	(Netherlands) Pierre Karsmakers	Yamaha	2		6	9			8	4																	30
13	(West Germany) Willy Bauer	KTM	4			10	6		5	9		9													6		29
14	(Belgium) Yvan van den Broeck	Maico				7													7	7		8	10	10		10	18
15	(United States) Jim Pomeroy	Honda													1												15
15	(Sweden) Arne Lindfors	Husqvarna								10	8	5								9	8						15
17	(Austria) Siegfrid Lerner	KTM	8	6																			8				11
17	(United States) Gaylon Mosier	Maico													10	3											11
17	(United States) Tommy Croft	Honda													5	6											11
20	(Denmark) Arne Lodal	Husqvarna	10				5	8																			10
20	(Netherlands) Peter Herlings	Maico				6		7													10						10
22	(Sweden) Åke Jonsson	Maico						6																	10	8	9
22	(Italy) Alberto Angiolini	Maico									10	10	8													7	9
22	(United States) Tony DiStefano	Suzuki													6	7											9
25	(Sweden) Ove Hogberg	Beta						5																			6
25	(Italy) Afro Rustignoli	Montesa											5														6
27	(Netherlands) Frans Sigmans	Husqvarna			7															10							5
27	(United States) Jimmy Ellis	Can-Am															9	8									5
27	(Belgium) André Vromans	Suzuki																	9						8		5
27	(Italy) Italo Forni	Montesa											7	10													5
31	(Czech Republic) Oldrich Hamrsmid	ČZ	9											9													4
31	(Netherlands) Math Hensen	Maico			10	8																					4
33	(United States) Marty Smith	Honda													8												3
33	(United States) Billy Grossi	Suzuki														8											3
33	(United Kingdom) Bob Wright	CCM		10																						9	3
36	(Denmark) Frank Svendsen	Husqvarna									9																2
36	(West Germany) Fritz Köbele	Maico																				9					2
36	(United Kingdom) Vic Eastwood	CCM																						9			2
36	(Belgium) Sylvain Geboers	Maico																							9		2
40	(United Kingdom) Vic Allan	CCM						10																			1
40	(Canada) Bob Levy	Husqvarna															10										1
40	(Canada) Yves Bertrand	Suzuki																10									1

=== 250cc ===
(Results in italics indicate overall winner)

Pos	Rider	Machine	ESP (Spain)		SUI (Switzerland)		BEL (Belgium)		TCH (Czechoslovakia)		ITA (Italy)		AUT (Austria)		USR (Soviet Union)		YUG (Socialist Federal Republic of Yugoslavia)		GER (West Germany)		GBR (United Kingdom)		SWE (Sweden)		FIN (Finland)		Points
1	(Soviet Union) Gennady Moiseyev	KTM	2	9	3	2	1	1			1	1	1		1	1	9	6	1		1	1	3	2	1	1	245
2	(Soviet Union) Vladimir Kavinov	KTM	3			1	10	3	2	2	9	2	7	1	2	2	4	8		1	2		1	1	3	4	203
3	(Belgium) André Malherbe	KTM	7	4			3	8		7		7	4	3	6	4		2	3	2		2	5	3	2	2	150
4	(Belgium) Harry Everts	Bultaco	5	3	1	8	2	5	3		2		8	8			6	5	2		5		2				121
5	(West Germany) Hans Maisch	Maico		1	4	4			4	4			3		8			3	6	5	8	3	9		7		100
6	(Czech Republic) Antonin Baborovsky	ČZ	9	7	5		9		1	3			2		5	6	1	10	10	4	6					5	98
7	(Belgium) Raymond Boven	Montesa	1	5	6		5	6	7	6		10		7	9	7	7		9				7		8	6	75
8	(Belgium) Jean-Paul Mingels	Montesa	8	8	2	6	4	10	6		7	9		5			3			10	4	8					71
9	(Czech Republic) Jaroslav Falta	ČZ	6	2						1	10	6	6	6	3				8				10			9	64
10	(France) Jean-Jacques Bruno	KTM		10	9		8			9	4	4				8			7		3	5	4	6	10		61
11	(Japan) Torao Suzuki	Suzuki			8			2			6	8	5	2			8		4						5		58
11	(Sweden) Torleif Hansen	Kawasaki				3		4			5	3						4	5	3							58
13	(United Kingdom) Neil Hudson	Maico			7		7	7	8		8		9		7	9	5			7	9	9	8	4			51
14	(Soviet Union) Anatoly Ovchinikov	KTM								5		5		4		3		1									45
15	(West Germany) Rolf Dieffenbach	Kramer-Rotax												10			10	9		6		6		5	6	3	35
16	(France) Daniel Péan	Maico															2	7				4		7			28
17	(Sweden) Håkan Carlqvist	Husqvarna	4	6		5															7						23
18	(Sweden) Erkki Sundstrom	Husqvarna							10														6		4	8	17
19	(Italy) Afro Rustignoli	Montesa									3																10
19	(United States) Marty Moates	Ossa				7			5																		10
19	(West Germany) Fritz Schneider	Maico					6	9					10	9													10
22	(Soviet Union) Vladimir Khudiakov	ČZ	10												4												9
22	(United Kingdom) Rob Hooper	Maico				9				8												10			9	10	9
24	(Czech Republic) Stanislav Janicek	ČZ													10	5											7
24	(Finland) Tapani Pikkarainen	KTM				10														8				8			7
26	(United Kingdom) Graham Noyce	Maico																			10	7					6
27	(Finland) Matti Tarkkonen	Yamaha																								7	4
27	(United Kingdom) Geoff Mayes	Kawasaki																		9				9			4
29	(Czech Republic) Miroslav Halm	ČZ			10				9																		3
30	(Czech Republic) Miroslav Jirka	ČZ								10																	1
30	(Switzerland) Christophe Husser	Yamaha														10											1
30	(Sweden) Tommy Olsson	Monteas																						10			1

=== 125cc ===
(Results in italics indicate overall winner)

Pos	Rider	Machine	FRA (France)		ITA (Italy)		BEL (Belgium)		DEN (Denmark)		POL (Poland)		YUG (Socialist Federal Republic of Yugoslavia)		TCH (Czechoslovakia)		GER (West Germany)		SUI (Switzerland)		USA (United States)		CAN (Canada)		ESP (Spain)		Points
1	(Belgium) Gaston Rahier	Suzuki	1	2	1	8	1	1	2	2	1		1	1	1	5	1	1	1	1	3	1	2		1	1	292
2	(Netherlands) Gérard Rond	Yamaha	3	6	8	3	7		1	1	2	1	4		2	1	2	2	4	2	1		5		2		201
3	(Belgium) André Massant	Yamaha			4	5	3	3	3	6	9		7	4	7		5	3	3	3	4		1	2	3	10	149
4	(Czech Republic) Jiří Churavý	ČZ	10	3	5	2		7		7	6	4		2	3	2		9	7	5	7	8	4	4	5	2	137
5	(Finland) Göte Liljegren	KTM	7	7				6	4	3	5	6	5	7	6	6	10	8	2	6					6	6	93
6	(Soviet Union) Yuri Khudiakov	ČZ	4				8		5		3	2		3	9	7	8		10		9	4		3		5	85
7	(Belgium) Gilbert De Roover	Beta				6	2	5	6				3	10			3	4	5						4	3	81
8	(Finland) Matti Autio	KTM		8				9	9	4	4	5			5	3	7		6	4					7	4	74
9	(Japan) Akira Watanabe	Suzuki	2	1	2	1																					54
9	(Italy) Paolo Piron	Beta			3				10		7	8		5	4	4	4	5									54
11	(Soviet Union) Pavel Rulev	ČZ	8		7		6	8		5	10		6							9			6	5	8	8	46
12	(Czech Republic) Zdeněk Velký	ČZ	5			4						3			8							6		6			37
13	(Belgium) François Minne	Yamaha		10	9			2	7	9				8			9								9	7	32
14	(Italy) Corrado Maddii	Aspès		9									2	6		10	6	6									30
15	(United States) Warren Reid	Honda																					3	1			25
16	(Japan) Koji Masuda	Suzuki																			2	2					24
17	(United States) Pat Ritcher	Honda																			5	3					16
17	(United Kingdom) Roger Harvey	Husqvarna	6	5												8										9	16
19	(Italy) Ivan Alborghetti	Aprilia				7		4												8							15
20	(United Kingdom) Andy Ainsworth	Husqvarna					10		8	8			9		10	9											12
21	(Switzerland) Walter Kalberer	Husqvarna	9	4																							10
21	(Austria) Gerhard Huber	Can-Am																7	9	7							10
23	(France) Patrick Boniface	Yamaha					4											10									9
23	(United States) Gary Ogden	Honda																			6	7					9
23	(Italy) Dario Nani	Gilera			6	9								9													9
23	(Netherlands) Dinand Ziljlstra	Kawasaki								10	8	7	10														9
27	(Canada) Jorma Rautiainen	Maico																					7	7			8
28	(Belgium) Dieudonne Stouvenakers	Derbi					5	10																			7
28	(United States) Frank Stacy	Suzuki																			10	5					7
30	(Canada) Joe MacIntosch	Yamaha																					9	8			5
31	(Canada) Jay Kimber	Yamaha																					8	10			4
32	(Belgium) Eddy Hau	Zündapp											8														8
32	(Austria) Alois Weiss	Can-Am																	8								3
32	(United States) Danny LaPorte	Suzuki																			8						3
35	(Czech Republic) Karel Kasten	ČZ					9																				2
35	(Sweden) Steffan Andersson	Honda										9															2
35	(United States) Mike Jones	Honda																				9					2
35	(Belgium) Mike Van der Beken	Honda																						9			2
39	(Belgium) Robert Greisch	Yamaha			10																						1
39	(Italy) Ivano Bessone	Gilera				10																					1
39	(France) Alain Fura	Yamaha										10															1
39	(Switzerland) Joseph Loetscher	KTM																		10							1
39	(United States) John Savitski	Yamaha																				10					1
39	(Canada) David James	Suzuki																					10				1
39	(Spain) Antonio Elias	Bultaco																							10		1
