= Cheney Racing =

British motorcycle manufacturer

- Company type: Private
- Industry: Motorcycle
- Headquarters: Petersfield, Hampshire, United Kingdom
- Key people: Eric Cheney (founder); Simon Cheney; Barry Hall
- Products: Motorcycles and frame kits
- Website: Official Web Site

Cheney Racing is a British motorcycle manufacturer, founded by Eric Cheney, based in Petersfield, Hampshire which builds complete specialist high performance motocross motorcycles, rolling chassis or frame kits to individual customer specifications.

== Development ==
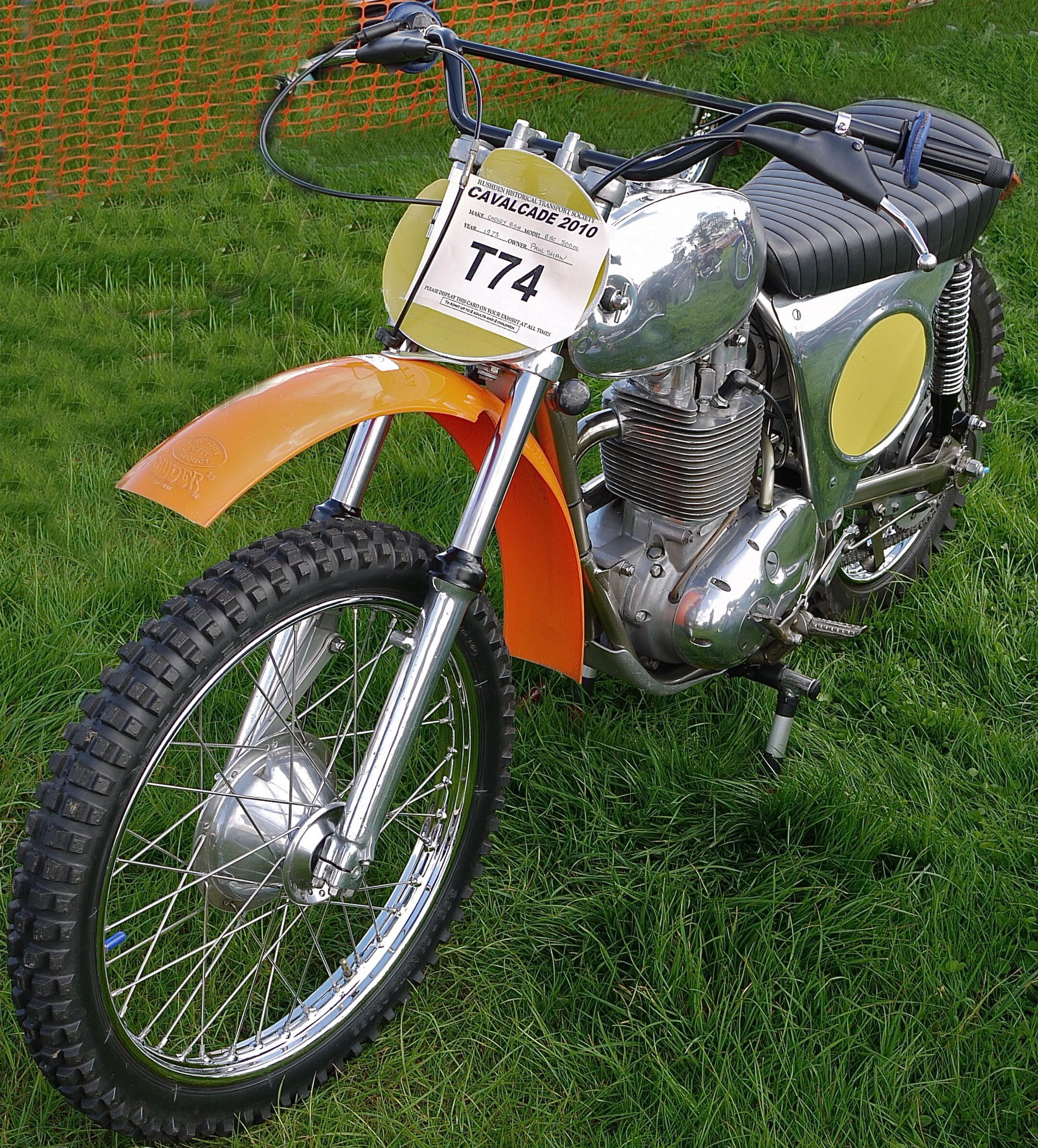
1973 Cheney 500 cc BSA B50 Victor 1973

Engineer Eric Cheney developed a lightweight competition for a BSA Gold Star in the 1960s which saw success in the 1970s when John Banks won the British Motocross Championship on a Cheney-framed BSA motorcycle. He never worked for any of the major manufacturers but maintained a productive relationship with BSA in its heyday. After the demise of BSA in 1972, Cheney joined with former BSA factory rider John Banks to develop and ride successful BSA powered motocross bikes. His company was originally known as Eric Cheney Designs, then changed to Inter-Moto and is now known as Cheney Racing. Eric handed on his ideas to his son Simon Cheney, who is also an experienced competition rider. Each of the hand built motorcycles takes over 400 man hours to complete.

== Cheney ISDT Team ==
In the late 1960s the British motorcycle industry was unable to support a national ISDT team so Eric Cheney hand built a limited number of ISDT Cheney-Triumphs, using his own design of twin down-tube frame with a specially tuned Triumph 5TA engine. Fitted with tapered conical hubs, special motocross forks and large alloy fuel tanks, a Cheney Triumph was first used in the 1968 British Trophy Team.

In 1970 and 1971 three 504cc Cheney Triumphs were used by the British team in the International Six Days Trial (ISDT). Replicas were built, but production was short-lived due to a shortage of engines

== Model range ==
Although each Cheney motorcycle is different, many are based on the BSA C15 250 cc engine or the larger 500 cc unit version. The company also manufacture black powder-coated frame kits for BSA C15, B25, B40, B44 and B50 engines, as well as nickel-plated frame kits for Triumph 500 cc or 350 cc unit engines.
