= 1970 Inter-AM Motocross Series =

International motocross series

The 1970 Inter-AM motocross series was the 4th edition of the international racing series established by the American distributor for Husqvarna Motorcycles Edison Dye, as a pilot event to help establish motocross in the United States. The motocross series was an invitational based on a combined 250 and 500cc engine displacement formula, run on American tracks featuring some of the top competitors from the Motocross World Championships racing against the top American riders.

Maico factory team rider Åke Jonsson won the series with seven victories to finish ahead of Husqvarna teammates Bengt Åberg and Christer Hammargren in second and third places. Åberg was filmed while competing in the final round of the series at Saddleback Park as part of the 1971 Bruce Brown motorcycle documentary film, On Any Sunday. The film's success was credited with helping to spark an explosive growth in American motorcycle sales numbers as the baby boomer generation came of age.

== 1970 Inter-AM rounds ==
Round	Date	Location	Overall Winner	Top American
1	4 October	Elkhorn, Wisconsin	(Sweden) Åke Jonsson	John DeSoto
2	11 October	Pepperell, Massachusetts	(Sweden) Arne Kring	?
3	18 October	Linnville, Ohio	(Sweden) Åke Jonsson	Robert Taylor
4	25 October	Tulsa International Raceways	(Sweden) Bengt Åberg	Bob Grossi
5	1 November	Los Angeles, California	(Sweden) Åke Jonsson	?
6	8 November	Sacramento, California	(Sweden) Åke Jonsson	Bob Grossi
7	15 November	Phoenix, Arizona	(Sweden) Bengt Åberg	Robert Taylor
8	22 November	Salem, Oregon	(Sweden) Åke Jonsson	Robert Leach
9	29 November	San Francisco, California	(Sweden) Åke Jonsson	?
10	6 December	Irving, California	(Sweden) Åke Jonsson	?

== 1970 Inter-AM final standings ==
Pos	Rider	Machine	1	2	3	4	5	6	7	8	9	10
1	(Sweden) Åke Jonsson	Maico	1	3	1	2	1	1	2	1	1	1
2	(Sweden) Bengt Åberg	Husqvarna	2	2	2	1		2	1	2	2	2
3	(Sweden) Christer Hammargren	Husqvarna	4	4	3						4	3
4	(West Germany) Willy Bauer	Maico		6	4	4	5	4	3	3	7	6
5	(Belgium) Sylvain Geboers	Suzuki					3				3	4
6	(Sweden) Torsten Hallman	Husqvarna		5		3	6	5				
7	(Sweden) Arne Kring	Husqvarna		1			2					
8	(Czech Republic) Miroslav Halm	ČZ					4					5
9	(Czech Republic) Otakar Toman	ČZ	3			5						
10	(United States) John DeSoto	ČZ	5		7							
11	(United Kingdom) Dave Bickers	ČZ		7	5			6	6			
12	(France) Jaques Vernier	ČZ										
-	(Belgium) Roger De Coster	ČZ									5	
-	(United Kingdom) Jeff Smith	BSA										7
-	(United Kingdom) Andy Roberton	AJS									6	

== See also ==
- List of Trans-AMA motocross champions
- 1970 FIM Motocross World Championship
- 1970 Trans-AMA motocross series
