= John Banks (motorcyclist) =

British motocross racer

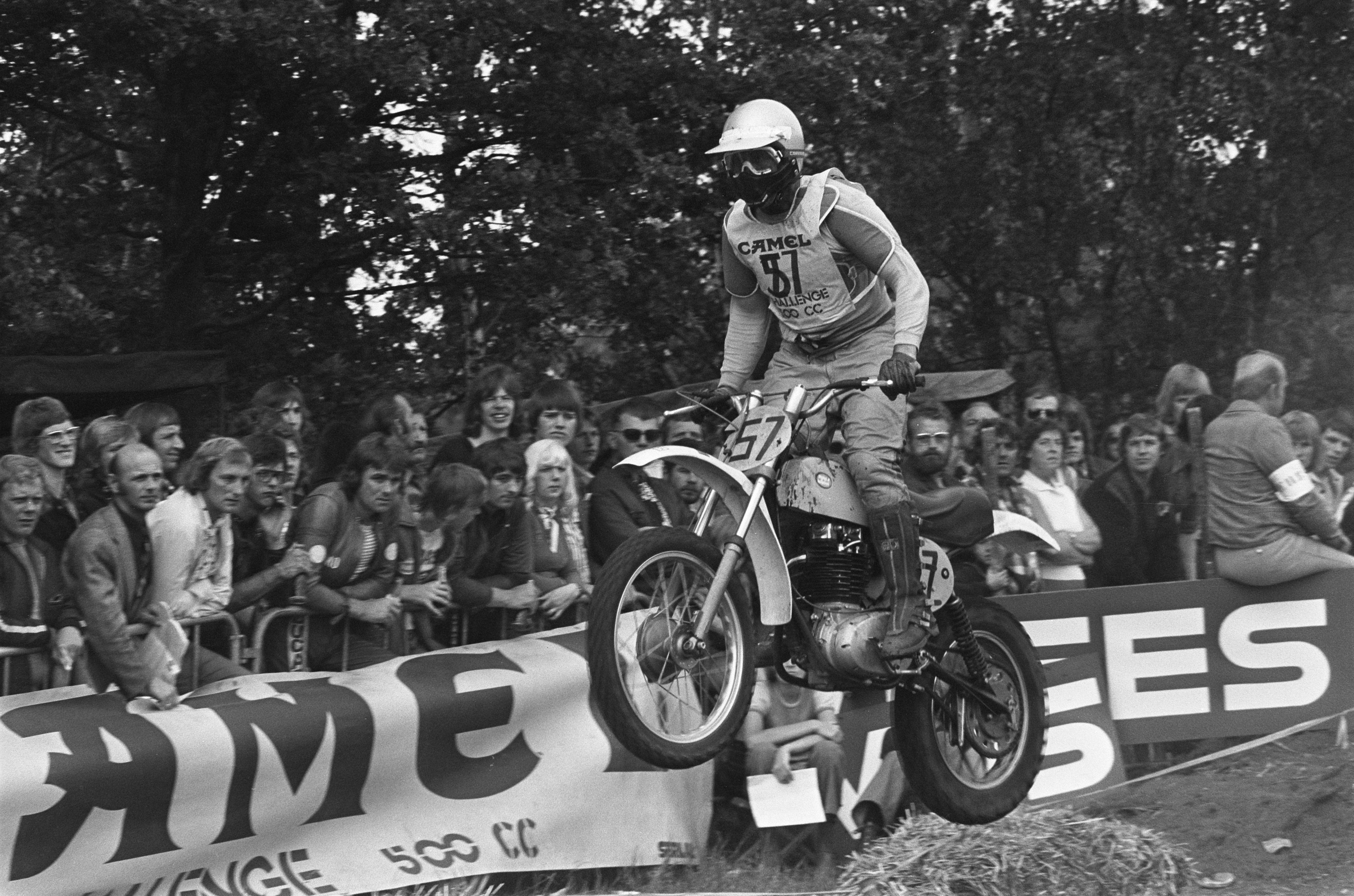
- John Banks riding a CCM at the 1975 500cc Dutch Grand Prix
- Nationality: British
- Born: April 16, 1944 (age 82)

Motocross career
- Years active: 1963 – 1977
- Teams: Dot, BSA, CCM

John Banks (born 16 April 1944) is a British former professional motocross racer. He competed in the Motocross World Championships from 1963 to 1977. A four-time 500cc British national champion, Banks was twice runner-up in the 500cc motocross world championship.

== Motorcycle racing career ==
Banks was the son of a successful builder from Bury St Edmunds. His first motorcycle was a Greeves trials motorcycle that he bought from Dave Bickers, the 1960 and 1961 European motocross champion. He then gained a sponsorship from the Dot motorcycle company and in 1963 he placed third at the Swiss Grand Prix just after turning 19. His impressive results led to an offer to ride for the BSA factory racing team in 1966 as a teammate to Jeff Smith. He contested a few rounds of the 1967 500cc motocross world championship scoring a third place at the Luxembourg Grand Prix and, placing 12th in the season final points standing. He won the 1967–68 BBC Grandstand winter series to claim his first major victory.

Entering the 1968 season, Banks faced strong competition from the defending world champion Paul Friedrichs and his ČZ teammate Roger De Coster as well as the Swedish Husqvarna team riders Bengt Åberg and Åke Jonsson. He won his first individual race victory in the second moto of the season opening 1968 Austrian Grand Prix.

The fifth 500cc Grand Prix event of the year would be held in Friedrichs' homeland of East Germany and, Communist authorities were eager to help an East German rider on a ČZ motorcycle built in a neighboring Communist country in order to demonstrate the inferiority of western capitalism. The East German Grand Prix was not attended by the majority of western European riders due to the difficulty in procuring visas and traveling behind the Iron Curtain. That gave communist authorities the opportunity to enter several local East German competitors who helped Friedrichs to win the race by continually obstructing Banks' path. Banks placed fourth behind Friedrichs and fellow Eastern Bloc competitors, Vlastimil Valek and Petr Dobry.

Banks won his first-ever overall world championship race at the ninth round of the series with a victory at the French Grand Prix and, followed one week later with a victory at the Dutch Grand Prix. The setting of the Belgian Grand Prix was a rugged, narrow track in the forests surrounding the picturesque hilltop Citadel of Namur. First held in 1947, the Namur Grand Prix was revered by motocross enthusiasts in the same manner that auto racing enthusiasts considered the Monaco Grand Prix to be the crown jewel of the Formula One season. Banks would claim the championship points lead from Jonsson with a second place finish in Belgium as Jonsson suffered mechanical malfunctions. Banks finished third behind Vic Eastwood and Friedrichs at the penultimate round in Luxembourg.

With one race left in the world championship, Banks held a slim points lead over Friedrichs and Jonsson. At the season ending Swiss Grand Prix, Friedrichs was the overall winner, thus relegating Banks to second place in the final points standings by one point. Banks actually scored more points overall but fell victim to FIM scoring rules which only recognized the top seven of thirteen results. The rules would be changed in 1977. In the face of the rapid development of two-stroke engine technology, the BSA factory was the last remaining manufacturer to compete in the World Championships with four-stroke engines

Banks began the 1969 season strongly with second place finishes at the season opening Austrian Grand Prix and in round 3 at the Dutch Grand Prix then, scored consecutive victories at the Czechoslovak and Russian Grands Prix. After finishing second to De Coster at the Belgian Grand Prix, his luck began to change. He suffered an ignition failure in the West German Grand Prix, had a tire puncture in Luxembourg then, suffered another ignition failure in the French Grand Prix. Finally, at the Swiss Grand Prix he punctured another tire, allowing Bengt Åberg to overtake him to win the 1969 500cc motocross world championship.

Banks suffered a dislocated knee during the 1970 season that forced him to miss the world championships. He returned from his injury to place second behind BSA teammate Dave Nicoll in the 1970 Trans-AMA motocross series, established by the American Motorcyclist Association as a pilot event to help establish motocross in the United States. By the late 1960s, advances in two stroke engine technology meant that the heavier, four stroke machines such as Banks' BSA, were becoming obsolete in the motocross world championships.

In the middle of the 1971 season, BSA announced that they were ceasing operations, leaving Banks unemployed. He would complete the remainder of the season riding as a privateer on a Husqvarna motorcycle. At the end of the world championships, he returned to the United States where, he rode a ČZ motorcycle to compete in the 1971 Trans-AMA motocross series.

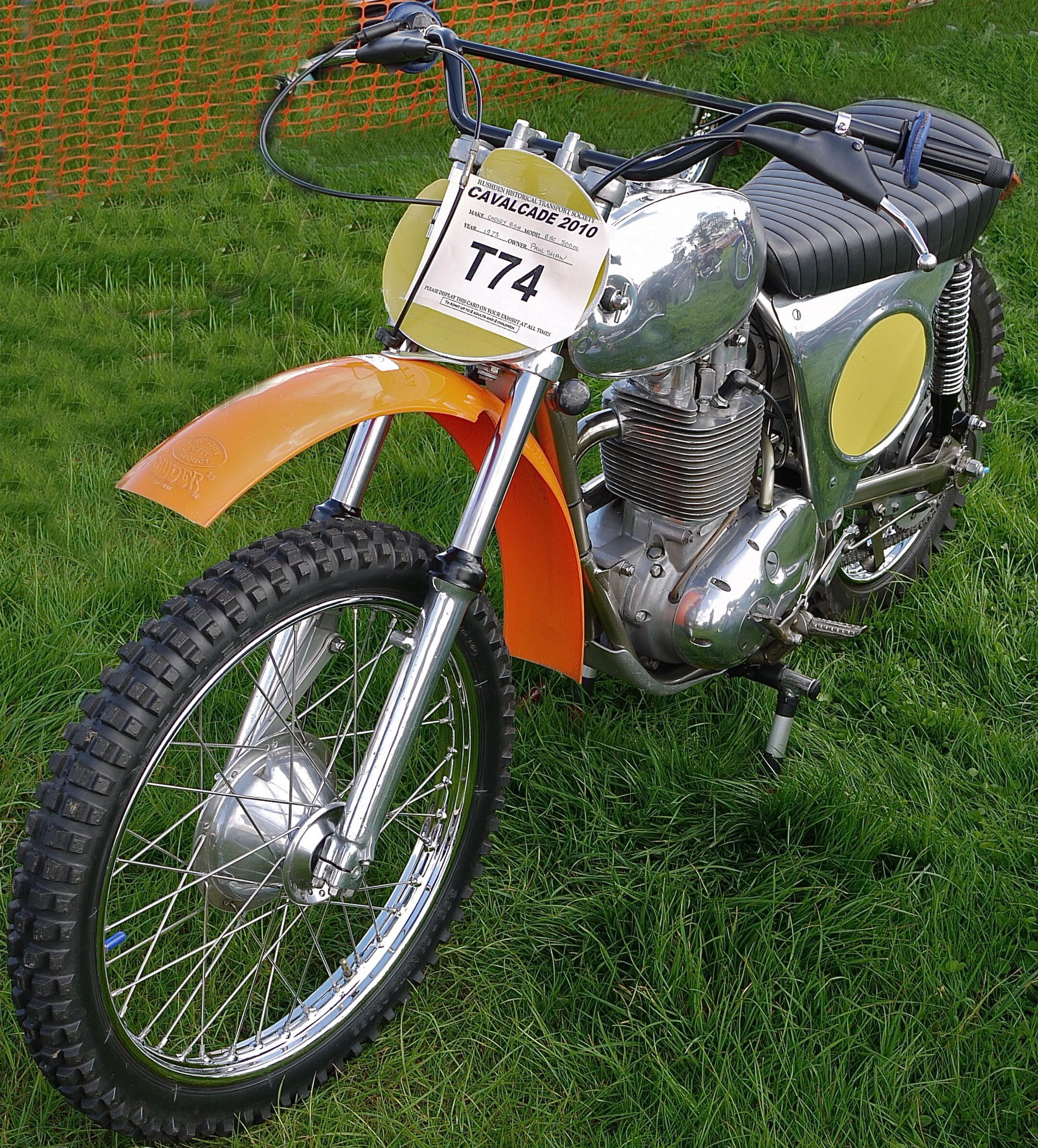
1973 Cheney 500 cc BSA B50 Victor

Banks then accepted an offer from designer Eric Cheney to campaign BSA B50 motorcycles in the 1973 FIM Motocross World Championship. Despite the BSA's weight handicap, Banks still managed several top five placings in the world championships against lighter, two stroke motorcycles, including an impressive performance at the 1973 500cc United States Grand Prix in Southern California where, on the hard packed desert terrain, the explosive power delivery of two stroke engines put them at a disadvantage to more tractable power delivery of Banks' BSA. He finished the first moto in third place behind Willy Bauer and Roger De Coster then, finished the second moto in fourth place behind Bauer, Gerrit Wolsink and Jaak van Velthoven.

After two seasons riding for Cheney, in 1975 Banks switched to CCM motorcycles, also powered by BSA engines. He managed some impressive results in 1977 including, a fourth place in Canada and an inspired performance at the 500cc British Grand Prix where he finished the second moto in second place behind Heikki Mikkola on a Yamaha and ahead of fellow countryman Graham Noyce on a Honda. 1977 would be his final season in the motocross world championships.

Banks won ten individual heat races and four Grand Prix victories during his world championship racing career. He was a two-time 500cc Class Vice Champion (1968, 1969} and won four British Motocross Championships (1968, 1969, 1970, 1973). He was a member of six British Motocross des Nations teams (1969, 1971-1974, 1977). Banks also won four BBC Grandstand trophy titles, two World of Sport championships, was named East Anglian Sports Personality of the Year.

Banks' son, Mark, won the 1988 125cc British motocross national championship and, his grandson Elliot Banks Browne won the 2012 MX2 British national championship.

== Motocross Grand Prix Results ==
Points system from 1952 to 1968:

Position	1st	2nd	3rd	4th	5th	6th
Points	8	6	4	3	2	1

Points system from 1969 to 1980:

Position	1	2	3	4	5	6	7	8	9	10
Points	15	12	10	8	6	5	4	3	2	1

Year	Class	Team	1		2		3		4		5		6		7		8		9		10		11		12		13		14		15		Pos	Pts
Year	Class	Team	R1	R2	R1	R2	R1	R2	R1	R2	R1	R2	R1	R2	R1	R2	R1	R2	R1	R2	R1	R2	R1	R2	R1	R2	R1	R2	R1	R2	R1	R2	Pos	Pts
1963	250cc	Dot	ESP; 10	ESP; 13	ITA -	ITA -	FRA; 9	FRA; 28	CH; 8	CH; 3	GER -	GER -	LUX -	LUX; 13	NED -	NED -	UK; 3	UK -	SWE -	SWE -	FIN -	FIN -	USR -	USR -	POL -	POL -	TCH -	TCH -	GDR -	GDR -			13th	4
1967	500cc	BSA	AUT -	AUT; 15	ITA -	ITA -	SWE -	SWE -	TCH -	TCH -	USR -	USR -	FRA -	FRA -	GER -	GER -	UK -	UK -	BEL; 9	BEL -	LUX; 4	LUX; 6	CH; 10	CH; 3									5th	19
1968	500cc	BSA	AUT; 30	AUT; 1	ITA -	ITA -	SWE -	SWE -	FIN; 5	FIN; 1	GDR; 4	GDR; 4	TCH; 3	TCH; 2	UK -	UK -	GER; 8	GER; 4	FRA; 2	FRA; 1	NED; 1	NED; 1	BEL; 1	BEL; 4	LUX; 6	LUX; 2	CH; 3	CH; 5					2nd	41
1969	500cc	BSA	AUT; 7	AUT; 2	SWE -	SWE -	NED; 3	NED; 1	ITA -	ITA; 3	TCH; 2	TCH; 1	USR; 1	USR; 2	GER -	GER -	BEL; 2	BEL; 1	LUX; 3	LUX -	FRA -	FRA -	CH -	CH -	GDR; 7	GDR; 7							2nd	72
1970	500cc	BSA	CH; 5	CH -	AUT -	AUT -	NED -	NED -	FRA -	FRA -	FIN -	FIN -	SWE -	SWE -	TCH -	TCH -	USR -	USR -	GER -	GER -	GDR -	GDR -	BEL -	BEL -	LUX -	LUX -							-	0
1971	500cc	BSA	ITA; 11	ITA; 10	AUT; 12	AUT; 3	SWE -	SWE -	FIN; 8	FIN -	TCH; 8	TCH -	USR; 5	USR -	GDR; 3	GDR; 3	UK; 9	UK; 3	GER; 10	GER; 8	BEL -	BEL -	LUX -	LUX -	NED -	NED -							7th	37
1971	500cc	Husqvarna	ITA -	ITA -	AUT -	AUT -	SWE -	SWE -	FIN -	FIN -	TCH -	TCH -	USR -	USR -	GDR -	GDR -	UK -	UK -	GER -	GER -	BEL; 6	BEL; 4	LUX; 9	LUX; 9	NED -	NED -							7th	37
1972	500cc	ČZ	AUT -	AUT -	CH; 8	CH; 6	SWE; 7	SWE; 9	FRA; 8	FRA -	USR -	USR -	TCH; 9	TCH; 6	UK; 17	UK -	GER; 6	GER -	GDR -	GDR -	BEL -	BEL -	LUX -	LUX -									13th	16
1973	500cc	Cheney-BSA	FRA -	FRA -	AUT -	AUT -	FIN -	FIN -	ITA -	ITA; 4	TCH -	TCH -	USA; 3	USA; 4	GER -	GER -	BEL; 4	BEL -	LUX; 9	LUX -	NED -	NED -											11th	36
1974	500cc	CCM	AUT -	AUT -	FRA -	FRA -	ITA -	ITA -	DEN -	DEN; 7	TCH -	TCH -	GER -	GER; 8	UK -	UK -	USA -	USA -	NED -	NED -	BEL -	BEL -	LUX; 5	LUX -									15th	13
1976	500cc	CCM	CH -	CH -	FRA -	FRA -	ITA -	ITA -	AUT -	AUT -	SWE -	SWE -	FIN -	FIN -	GER -	GER -	USA -	USA -	CAN -	CAN -	UK; 5	UK -	BEL -	BEL -	LUX -	LUX -							27th	6
1977	500cc	CCM	AUT -	AUT -	NED; 9	NED -	SWE -	SWE -	FIN; 10	FIN -	GER -	GER; 8	ITA; 6	ITA; 5	USA -	USA; 10	CAN; 7	CAN; 5	UK; 2	UK -	BEL -	BEL; 10	LUX -	LUX -	CH -	CH -							11th	41
