= Eric Cheney =

British motorcycle racer (1924–2001)

- Cheney in January 1967 with a then-new model, using his own special lightweight frame and Greeves Challenger 250 engine weighing under 200 lb (91 kg)
- Born: 5 January 1924
- Died: 30 December 2001 (aged 77)
- Occupations: Motocross Motorcycle designer and manufacturer
- Children: Wendy Cousins Simon Cheney Robert Cheney

Eric Cheney (5 January 1924 – 30 December 2001) was an English motorcycle racer, designer and independent constructor. He was known as one of the best motorcycle frame designers of his era, concentrating mainly in the off-road competition aftermarket.

== Early life ==
Cheney attended a school in Winchester based on Lancasterian principles before joining the Royal Navy at the age of 18, where he served on wartime Arctic convoys and in motor torpedo boats and gained experience of engineering and working on high performance engines. Cheney also worked on the development of remote controlled submarines for the Royal Navy.

== Career ==
After World War II, Cheney joined the motorcycle dealers Archers of Aldershot as a mechanic. Cheney began racing motocross and became one Britain's best riders, along with his travelling companion Les Archer, who went on to become European champion. He had ten successful years on the Continental circuit but a prolonged illness due to an infection contracted while racing in Algeria ended his riding career. He moved into bike preparation and designs for motorcycle chassis and suspension systems.

Cheney had no formal training as a motorcycle designer yet was able to create original and high-performance motorcycle chassis designs working in a simple workshop that was essentially a domestic garage. His approach has been described as "like a medieval engineer" as in an age of computer-aided design and significant resources for research and development teams, he worked entirely by intuition. Eric relied on his long personal experience of international off-road competition riding and would prepare his initial designs for a new motorcycle frame in chalk on the wall of his workshop. Experimenting with different lines until he was satisfied, Cheney would then form the steel tubing using his chalk drawings as a guide. Only when he had built a working prototype motorcycle would he start work on a final jig for mass production. He was once quoted as saying "I know when it's right and it screams at me when it's wrong."

In the late 1960s, the British motorcycle industry was unable to support a national team to compete in the International Six Days Trial so, Cheney hand built a limited number of ISDT Cheney-Triumphs using his own design of twin down-tube frame with a specially tuned Triumph 5TA engine. Fitted with tapered conical hubs, special motocross forks and large alloy fuel tanks, a Cheney Triumph was first used in the 1968 British Trophy Team. In 1970 and 1971 three 504cc Cheney Triumphs were used by the British team in the ISDT, in which Cheney won a manufacturer's prize. Replicas were built, but production was short-lived due to a shortage of engines.

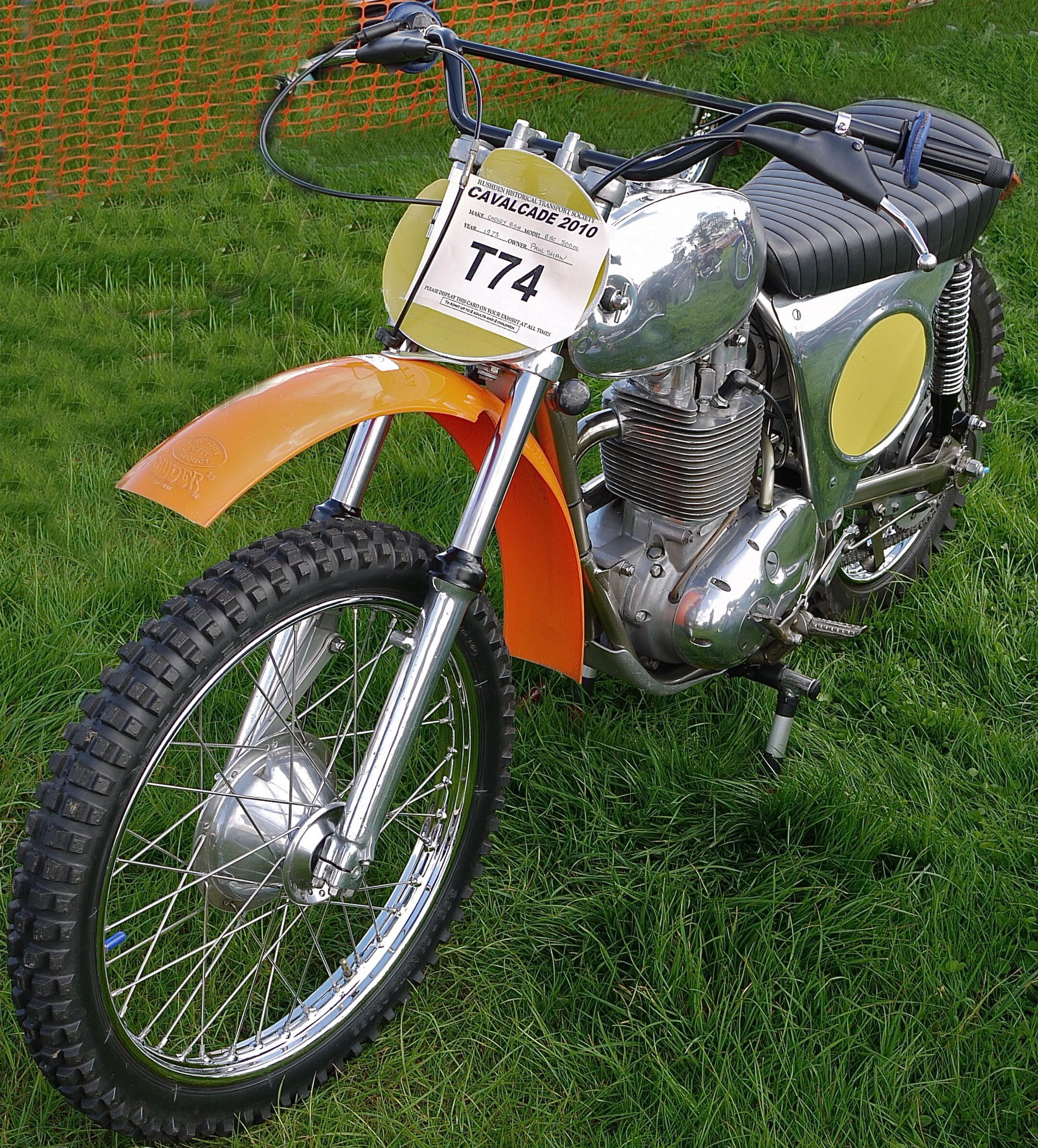
1973 Cheney 500 cc BSA B50 Victor

Cheney's most noted successes were in the Grand Prix road racing championships, with Phil Read using his chassis in tandem with a Yamaha engine to win the 1971 250cc world championship. His designs were the last British ones to win a Grand Prix. He never worked for any of the major manufacturers but maintained a productive relationship with BSA in its heyday. After the demise of BSA in 1972, Cheney joined with former BSA factory rider John Banks to develop and campaign a highly successful BSA powered motocross bike.

Some of Cheney's motorcycle designs are now famous in their own right, such as the competition BSA Gold Stars of Jerry Scott and Keith Hickman and the John Banks replica which used a BSA B50 engine specially tuned by Cheney. He also built some racing frames for Suzuki Grand Prix motorcycles in 1968 and, it has been suggested that Suzuki engineers incorporated features of Cheney's designs, such as magnesium hubs and lower fork legs into production road going motorcycles. Cheney's company was originally known as Eric Cheney Designs, then changed to Inter-Moto, now known as Cheney Racing.

== Steve McQueen ==
American actor Steve McQueen, an experienced off-road rider who represented the United States in the ISDT bought a number of Cheney's motorcycles at full price because he considered them better than other makes.
