= Dave Nicoll =

English motorcycle racer (1944–2023)

- Nationality: British
- Born: 11 May 1944
- Died: 9 March 2023 (aged 78)

Motocross career
- Years active: 1964 - 1978
- Teams: James, Matchless, BSA
- Wins: 1
- First GP win: 1969 500cc Luxembourg Grand Prix

Dave Nicoll (11 May 1944 – 9 March 2023) was an English professional Grand Prix motocross racer and at the time of his death in March 2023 the incumbent FIM's world championship Clerk of the Course. He competed in the Motocross World Championships from 1964 to 1978.

Nicoll began motorcycle racing at the age of 16 and received his first sponsorship from a Greeves distributor. At the age of 17, he received factory sponsorship from the James motorcycle company. In 1964, he began competing in the 500cc motocross world championships for the Matchless factory racing team. After three seasons with the Matchless team, he moved to the BSA factory team. His only Grand Prix victory came at the 1969 500cc Luxembourg Grand Prix. In 1970, Nicoll defeated world champions Joel Robert and Jeff Smith to win the 1970 Trans-AMA motocross series, established by the American Motorcyclist Association as a pilot event to help establish motocross in the United States.

After retiring from competition in 1978, Nicoll worked as the manager of the British Motocross des Nations team. When his son, Kurt began competing in the motocross world championships, Nicoll became his team manager. His son finished as the runner-up in the 500cc world championships four times. After his son retired from competition in 1997, Nicoll was hired by the FIM to become the Clerk of the Course for the motocross world championships.

Nicoll died on 9 March 2023, at the age of 78.
