= Akira Watanabe (motorcyclist) =

Japanese motorcycle racer

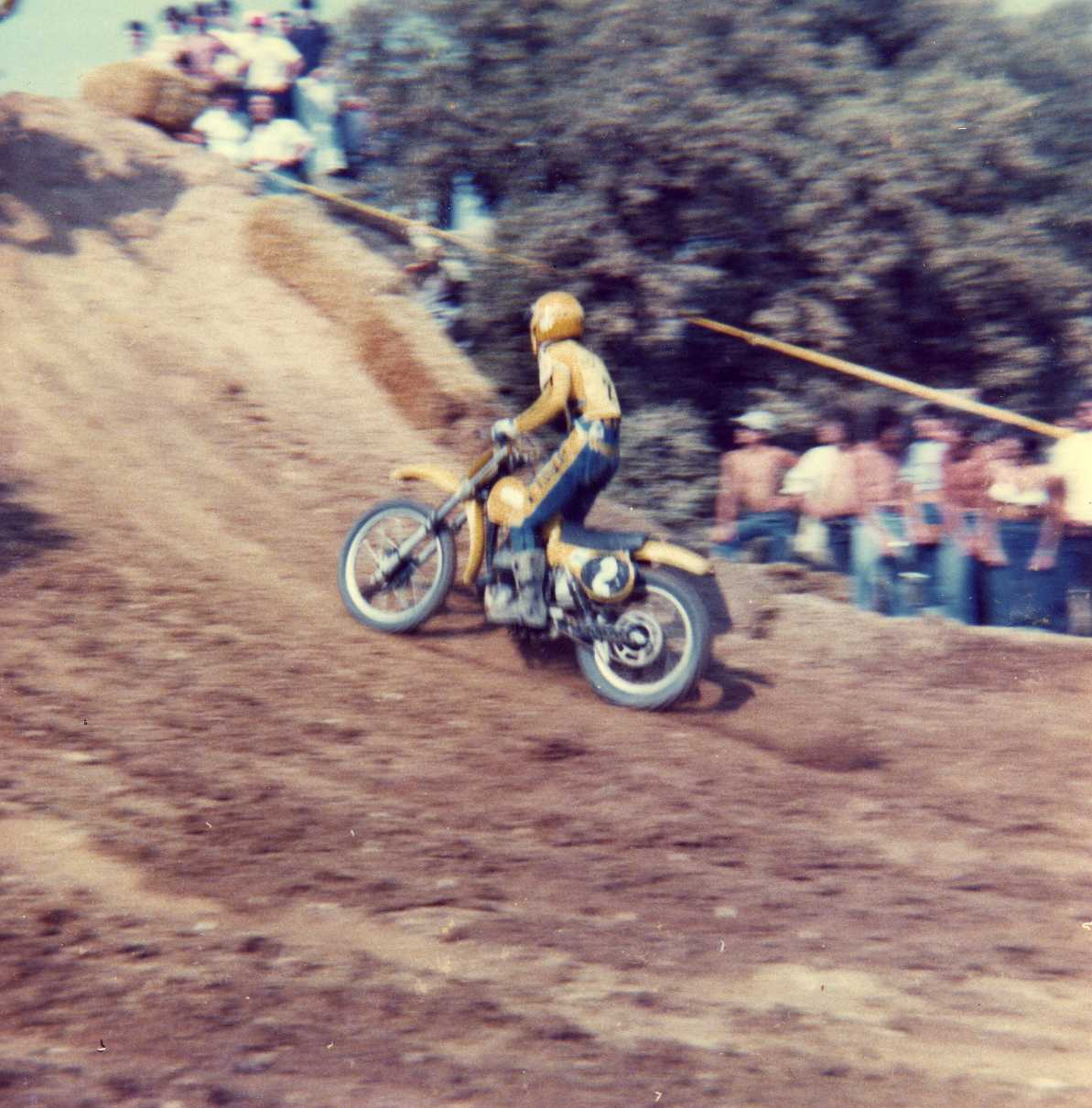
- Watanabe in 1978
- Nationality: Japanese
- Born: October 21, 1954 (age 72) Utsunomiya, Japan

Motocross career
- Years active: 1975 - 1982
- Teams: Suzuki
- Championships: 125cc - 1978
- Wins: 7

Akira Watanabe (渡辺明, Watanabe Akira; born 21 October 1954) is a Japanese former professional motocross racer and team manager. He competed in the Motocross World Championships from 1975 to 1982. Watanabe is notable for being the first and only Japanese competitor to win an FIM motocross world championship.

== Motorcycle racing career ==
Watanabe was born on 21 October 1954 in Utsunomiya, Japan. He rode a Suzuki motorcycle to win the 1974 125cc Japanese motocross national championship earning him a chance to compete in the 1975 125cc motocross world championship. He won his first international race at the 1975 125cc Spanish Grand Prix, becoming the first Japanese rider to win a motocross Grand Prix. He finished the 1975 season ranked fourth in the 125cc motocross world championship.

Watanabe returned to compete in the 1976 Japanese motocross national championship where, he finished second in both the 125cc and 250cc classes. Although Watanabe was known as a 125cc class rider, he scored a surprising first moto victory over 500cc world champion Roger De Coster at the 1976 Trans-AMA race held at the Mid-Ohio circuit.

Watanabe was leading the 1977 125cc motocross world championship after the first two races of the year, but suffered a broken leg in the third race and was forced to miss the rest of the season. After rehabilitating his injury, he returned to compete in the 1978 125cc motocross world championship. Watanabe won three Grand Prix races and consistently scored points while his rivals suffered accidents or mechanical problems to become the first and only Japanese competitor to win an FIM motocross world championship.

Watanabe finished second to his Suzuki teammate Harry Everts in the 1979 125cc motocross world championship. He continued to compete in the motocross world championships until 1982, when Suzuki withdrew from international motocross competition.

Watanabe returned to Japan where he continued to work in the Suzuki racing department as a development and test rider until 1988. He competed in the 1991 Paris to Dakar rally at the suggestion of his former Suzuki teammate Gaston Rahier. Watanabe opened a motorcycle shop in his hometown and became an organizer of enduro off-road races. In 2012, Watanabe returned to Suzuki as their motocross team manager. He managed Suzuki rider Kei Yamamoto to the 2012 250cc Japanese motocross national championship.
