= Edison Dye =

American motorsports promoter

- Born: Mario Edison Dye; May 10, 1918; Oskaloosa, Iowa, U.S.
- Died: May 10, 2007 (aged 89); Lemon Grove, California, U.S.
- Known for: Pioneer U.S. Motocross Promoter
- Children: Shirley

Mario Edison Dye (May 10, 1918 – May 10, 2007) was an American motorsports promoter, and Motorcycle Hall of Fame inductee. He has repeatedly been called "The Father of American Motocross".

== Early life ==
Edison was born in Oskaloosa, Iowa, moved first with the family to St. Joseph, MO, then to Los Angeles, CA. and finally to San Diego, CA. After graduating from Hoover High School he attended San Diego State University studying Aeronautical Engineering. Schooling gave way to auto racing. His racing experience led to a military career developing diesel engines for tanks and later his engineering degree led to work on B24 and B32 bombers.

== Motorcycle Career ==
After WWII Edison discovered motorcycling and decided to see Europe by motorcycle. By his second tour Edison was familiar with a cross section of the European motorcycle industry. To help defray the cost of the trip he was determined to bring home some European bikes. After trying Zundapp he chose Husqvarna and acquired two bikes. Back in the States with two 250cc Huskys he contacted a rider he rememberd he had seen perform at a local track. At the time Malcolm Smith was racing a British Greeves, but after one ride he asked to race the Husky and won the race.

In 1966, Edison's newly formed company, Med International, began importing Husqvarna motorcycles into the United States with Lars Larsson to do demonstrations of the motorcycles. Also the same year he paid European Motocross Champion Torsten Hallman to ride a series of demonstration events. The following year, after the conclusion of the European motocross championship, he brought six of the top riders in the world to the United States for the first American motocross series. Torsten Hallman, Arne Kring, Joël Robert (reigning world champion), Roger De Coster, Dave Bickers (British champion), and Åke Jonsson dominated every event of the series. With the success of these events the next year attracted twenty Europeans and the Inter-AM motocross series competition was born. By the 1970, the AMA responded to the growth of the sport of motocross by creating the Trans-AMA motocross series. The Inter-Am had run its course by 1974 and Edison retired from promoting American motocross.

== Awards and honors ==
- Inducted into the AMA Motorcycle Hall of Fame in 1999.
- Glen Helen Raceway, Walk of Fame.
- Mickey Thompson Lifetime Achievement Award, 2001
