= Joël Robert =

Belgian motorcycle racer (1943–2021)

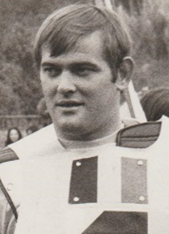
- Joël Robert (1973)
- Nationality: Belgian
- Born: 26 November 1943 Châtelet, Belgium
- Died: 13 January 2021 (aged 77) Gilly, Belgium

Motocross career
- Years active: 1962 – 1976
- Teams: CZ, Suzuki, Puch
- Championships: 250cc – 1964, 1968–1972
- Wins: 50

Joël Robert (26 November 1943 – 13 January 2021) was a Belgian professional motocross racer. He competed in the Motocross World Championships from 1962 to 1976 when the sport experienced a surge in popularity worldwide. A six-time world champion, Robert dominated the 250cc class for almost a decade when, he placed either first or second every year between 1964 and 1972 including, five consecutive world championships. In 1964, he was named the recipient of the Belgian National Sports Merit Award. He won a total of 50 Grand Prix races over his career, a record which stood for nearly 30 years.

Robert's success on the race track along with his impish personality made him one of the most publicized and popular motocross racers of the early 1970s. He was known as one of the most naturally talented motocross riders of his era however, he was also notorious for his cigarette smoking and lack of physical training despite his portly physique. His rivalry with Torsten Hallman produced some of the best races in the history of the championships.

Robert played an integral role in the introduction of the sport of motocross in the United States and, served as inspiration to early American motocross racers. He was recognized for his contribution to the development of American motocross in 2000 when, he was inducted into the AMA Motorcycle Hall of Fame. In 2019, Robert was named an FIM Motocross Legend.

== Motorcycle racing career ==
Robert was born in Châtelet, Belgium and began riding motorcycles at the age of 6 when his father, a former motocross and speedway racer, built him his first motorcycle, a 125cc Gillet. His boyhood idols were Belgian motocross stars René Baeten and Auguste Mingels.

At the age of 16, Robert converted a Zündapp street bike into a motocross bike and, entered his first motocross race on April 10, 1960. His parents provided him with financial support and accompanied him to many of the races close to Belgium. Other times he would travel with fellow racers or, sometimes by train with his dismantled motorcycle packed into his hand luggage. He won the Belgium junior motocross championship in his first year of competition.

After earning his expert class license in 1961, he switched to riding a Greeves and, won six races to finish second in the 250cc Belgian motocross national championship. He rode the 250cc Greeves to five victories the following year to win the 1962 Belgian motocross national championship. The FIM inaugurated the 250cc motocross world championship in 1962 and Robert was able to compete in some Grand Prix races, finishing the season ranked 14th in the world. In 1963, he repeated as Belgian national champion riding the Greeves and, entered all the world championship Grand Prix rounds where, he ended the season ranked 25th in the world with a fifth place at the 250cc Swedish Grand Prix being his best result.

At the end of the 1963 season, Robert's future racing career was in doubt as, his father lacked the financial resources to purchase a new motorcycle for the following season. Fortunately for Robert, Torsten Hallman rejected a contract to race for the CZ factory racing team, preferring to stay with the Husqvarna racing team. After being rejected by Hallman, CZ then offered Robert a motorcycle through the Belgian CZ importer to compete in the 1964 250cc motocross world championship as a privateer. He won 9 of the 14 Grand Prix races that year to clinch the world championship ahead of second place Torsten Hallman. At the age of 20, he became the youngest motocross world champion at the time. He also won the Belgium national championship.

He used to drink, smoke, and do all the things you shouldn't do and yet he could ride a 40 minute race as fast as anyone. He was amazing.

— John Banks commenting on Robert

Robert's impressive performance earned him a place on the ČZ factory racing team for the 1965 season. He began the year with an impressive victory over the reigning 500cc World Champion Jeff Smith at the Motocross der Azern, a prestigious preseason invitational race that fielded the top international competitors.

After dominating the 1964 season Robert expected to sweep to victory once again in 1965 however, he experienced an atrocious start to the new season while Russian ČZ rider Victor Arbekov blossomed into a championship contender. After his motorcycle had mechanical failures in Spain, Italy and Belgium, Robert was disqualified from the Czechoslovak Grand Prix for refueling at mid-distance while in leading the race. Meanwhile, Arbekov won four of the first seven Grands Prix to take the championship points lead by mid-season.

Robert was known to enjoy drinking beer and smoking cigarettes, and realized it was affecting his riding. He rededicated himself in the Luxembourg Grand Prix where he defeated Arbekov in both motos to take the overall victory however, his motorcycle failed him at the following Grand Prix in Poland, allowing Arbekov to take the victory and claim the 1965 250cc World Championship. Robert was able to secure second place in the final standings ahead of Dave Bickers by winning the season ending Austrian Grand Prix. He was the top individual points scorer at the 1965 Motocross des Nations event, winning both motos to help the Belgian team finish second to the British team.

=== Hallman rivalry ===
The following three seasons were marked by the rivalry between Robert and his greatest rival, Hallman. Defending champion Arbekov began the 1966 season with a victory at the Spanish Grand Prix, however he was injured in a serious crash at the second round in France and did not return until the 14th round. Robert and Hallman traded wins back and forth in a season-long battle for the 1966 250cc Motocross World Championship that wasn't decided until the final race when Hallman finally prevailed over his rival.

Husqvarna doubled its racing budget for 1967, with riders Håkan Andersson, Olle Pettersson and Staffan Eneqvist joining Hallman on the Husqvarna factory racing team. Hallman and Robert were once again the main protagonists in the battle for the 1967 250cc motocross World Championship. As with the previous year, the two rivals traded victories throughout the season. After eight of twelve rounds, Robert had won four Grand Prix races to Hallman's three however, Robert failed to finish in the three of the final four rounds, allowing Hallman to overtake him with a victory at the penultimate round in Russia and claim his fourth world championship by a slim two point margin. The two rivals dominated the championship with five Grand Prix victories apiece.

After the 1967 World Championship season, Robert joined his ČZ factory teammates Roger De Coster and Dave Bickers, along with Husqvarna teammates, Hallman, Arne Kring and Åke Jonsson, in a series of exhibition races in the United States that had been organized by Edison Dye, the American importer for Husqvarna motorcycles. The exhibition races served as a means to introduce the sport of motocross to an American audience, and eventually led to the formation of the Inter-AM and Trans-AMA motocross series that helped to popularize the sport of motocross in the United States.

The two competitors continued their rivalry into the 1968 season. The ČZ factory switched Dave Bickers from the 500cc class to the 250cc class and hired 23-year-old Sylvain Geboers to support Robert, while Husqvarna retained Håkan Andersson in support of Hallman. Olle Pettersson was hired from Husqvarna by the Suzuki factory to help develop their new motocross bike. After Robert won three consecutive Grand Prix races in France, Holland and West Germany to take the early points lead, Hallman then won three races in Russia, Yugoslavia and Sweden to tie Robert for the championship points lead as they went into the final round in Austria.

Hallman took the lead in the first heat race and had built a 23-second lead over Robert, when his motorcycle's rear tire was punctured allowing Robert to pass Hallman for the victory. As the second race began, Hallman once again took the lead until his engine began to overheat and lose power, allowing Robert to catch up and pass him for the race victory. Robert claimed the 1968 250cc World Championship by two points over Hallman. He was the top individual points scorer at the 1968 Trophée des Nations event, winning both motos to help the Belgian team finish second to the Swedish team.

In 1969, Robert and his ČZ teammate Sylvain Geboers engaged in a season long battle for the 250cc World Championship that wasn't decided until the final race of the season. Robert won six Grand Prix races while Geboers won four as Robert claimed his third World Championship. Geboers actually scored more points overall than Robert but falls victim to FIM scoring rules which only recognizes the top seven of twelve results. The rules would be changed in 1977. Robert was also a member of the Belgian team that won the 1969 Motocross des Nations for 500cc motorcycles and the Trophée des Nations for 250cc motorcycles, marking the first Belgian victory in 18 years at the event.

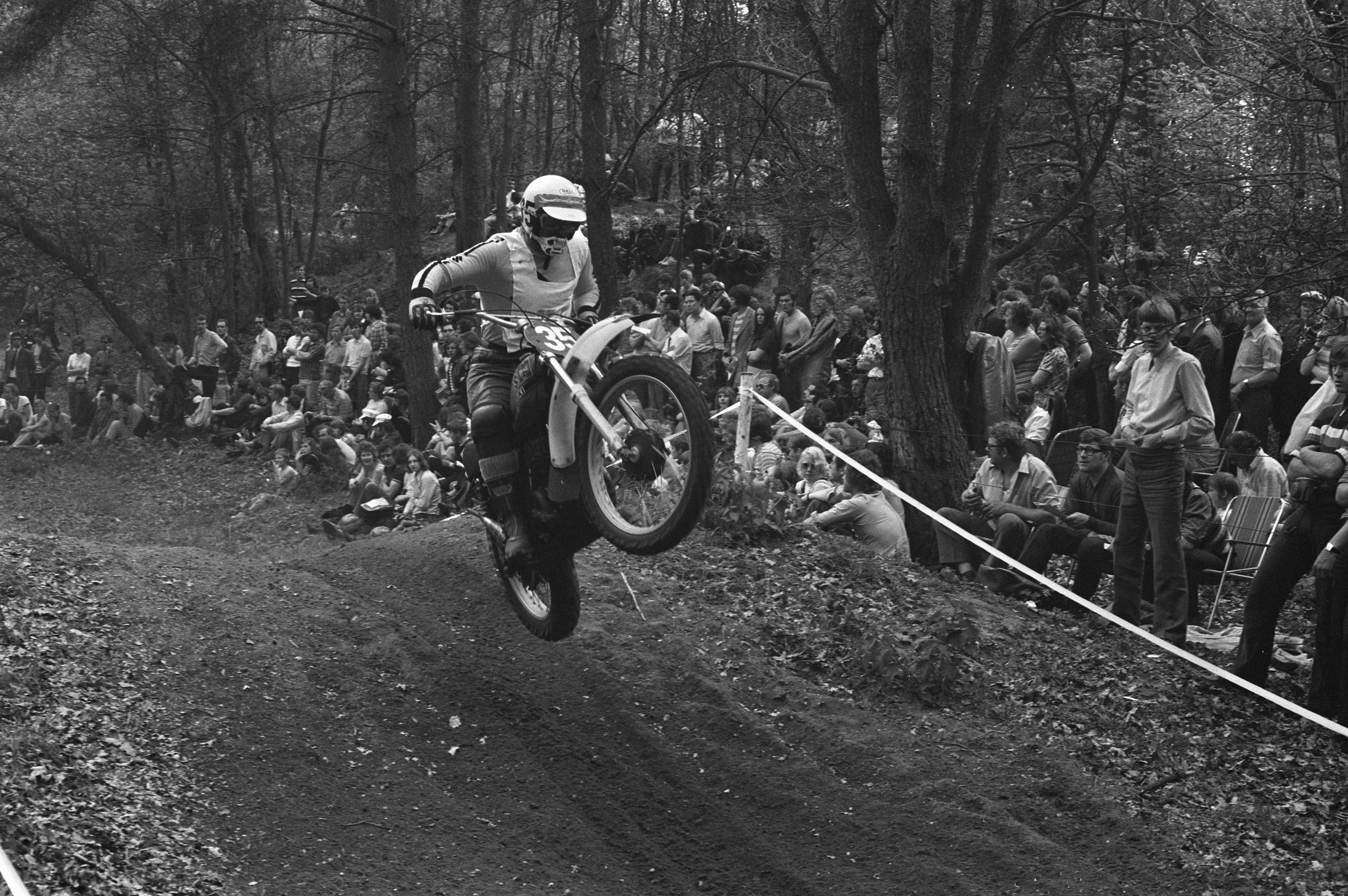
Robert in action in 1972

=== Move to Suzuki ===
The Suzuki factory became the first Japanese manufacturer to compete in a Motocross World Championship event at the 1965 250cc Swedish Grand Prix, and with the help of Swedish rider, Olle Pettersson, they had developed their motocycle to the point where Pettersson finished the 1969 championship in third place behind Robert and Geboers. The Suzuki team then hired both Geboers and Robert for the 1970 season.

The two Suzuki teammates dominated the 1970 250cc championship with each rider claiming four Grand Prix victories apiece. As with the previous year, the championship wasn't decided until the final round in Austria where Robert prevailed over his teammate by a slim two-point margin. His rivalry with Geboers came during a period of political and linguistic strife between the Belgian regions of Wallonia and Flanders during the 1970s and 1980s. Robert was from the French-speaking Wallonia while Geboers was from the Dutch-speaking Flanders region. The political climate created tension between the supporters of each rider. At the end of the season, Robert helped the Belgian team repeat as winners of the 1970 Motocross des Nations and the Trophée des Nations.

Robert played an integral role in the introduction of the sport of motocross in the United States by participating in the Trans-AMA motocross series which featured top European racers competing against the best American racers. He dominated the 1970 Trans-AMA series by winning six consecutive races. His participation as the reigning World Champion in the year-end Trans-AMA series helped to boost the credibility to America's first motocross championship series.

Robert continued to rule the 250cc world championship in 1971 by winning eight out of twelve Grand Prix races that year. In the 1972 250cc world championship season, he won six of the first eight Grand Prix races to build an insurmountable lead en route to winning his fifth consecutive world championship. He also participated in the Belgian teams triumph at the 1972 Motocross des Nations and Trophée des Nations.

=== Decline ===
Robert suffered a knee injury in a low-speed crash during practice for the 1972 500cc Belgian Grand Prix but, he refused to undergo surgery. The knee injury affected his performance during the 1973 season and, he dropped to 18th in the world championship. He continued to struggle with his injury for the next two seasons before Suzuki released him from his contract after the 1975 season. He signed a contract with Puch but, only raced in a few Grand Prix races and ended the season ranked 17th in the 1976 250cc world championship. At the age of 31, he competed in his last professional race in France on a Puch 400MC.

Robert won 101 individual heat races and 50 Grand Prix victories during his world championship racing career. He won six 250cc motocross world titles (1964, 1968–1972) and five 250cc Belgian national motocross championships (1963, 1964, 1966, 1972, 1973). He was a member of two victorious Belgian Motocross des Nations teams (1969, 1972) and five victorious Belgian Trophée des Nations teams (1969–1972). Robert was the top individual points scorer at the 1965 Motocross des Nations event as well as at the 1968 Trophée des Nations event. Robert's record of 50 motocross Grand Prix victories stood for nearly 30 years until it was broken in 2004 by fellow Belgian, Stefan Everts.

== Later life ==
Robert was inducted into the AMA Motorcycle Hall of Fame along with Torsten Hallman in 2000. He also served as manager for Belgium's Motocross des Nations team leading them to victory in 1997 and 1998.

Robert developed diabetes which resulted in having his foot amputated in 2018. He also suffered from lung problems and had experienced a few strokes. Robert contracted COVID-19 in early 2021 during the COVID-19 pandemic in Belgium and was hospitalized but there he suffered a heart attack that left him in a coma. He died on 13 January 2021.

== Motocross Grand Prix Results ==
Points system from 1952 to 1968:

Position	1st	2nd	3rd	4th	5th	6th
Points	8	6	4	3	2	1

Points system from 1969 to 1980:

Position	1	2	3	4	5	6	7	8	9	10
Points	15	12	10	8	6	5	4	3	2	1

Year	Class	Team	1		2		3		4		5		6		7		8		9		10		11		12		13		14		15		Pos	Pts
Year	Class	Team	R1	R2	R1	R2	R1	R2	R1	R2	R1	R2	R1	R2	R1	R2	R1	R2	R1	R2	R1	R2	R1	R2	R1	R2	R1	R2	R1	R2	R1	R2	Pos	Pts
1962	250cc	Greeves	ESP -	ESP -	CH; 6	CH; 4	BEL; 6	BEL; 10	FRA; 23	FRA -	TCH; 11	TCH; 5	POL -	POL -	NED; 8	NED -	LUX; 9	LUX -	FIN -	FIN -	USR -	USR -	GER -	GER -	ITA -	ITA -	UK; 13	UK; 14	SWE; 12	SWE; 7	GDR -	GDR -	14th	4
1963	250cc	Greeves	ESP; 9	ESP; 8	ITA; 9	ITA; 10	FRA -	FRA -	CH -	CH -	GER; 17	GER; 7	LUX -	LUX -	NED -	NED -	UK -	UK; 8	SWE -	SWE -	FIN -	FIN -	USR -	USR -	POL -	POL -	TCH -	TCH -	GDR -	GDR -			25th	2
1964	250cc	ČZ	ESP; 11	ESP; 8	BEL; 1	BEL; 1	CH; 1	CH; 1	TCH; 1	TCH; 1	GER; 1	GER; 2	LUX; 2	LUX; 2	ITA; 6	ITA; 2	UK; 2	UK; 1	SWE; 1	SWE; 3	FIN; 1	FIN; 1	USR; 1	USR; 2	POL -	POL -	GDR; 1	GDR -	FRA; 28	FRA -			1st	56
1965	250cc	ČZ	ESP; 4	ESP -	ITA; 2	ITA; 1	FRA; 1	FRA; 2	BEL -	BEL -	TCH; 1	TCH -	GER; 2	GER; 2	NED; 2	NED -	LUX; 1	LUX; 1	POL -	POL; 1	USR; 3	USR; 1	GDR; 1	GDR; 3	UK; 19	UK; 1	SWE -	SWE -	FIN -	FIN -	AUT; 1	AUT; 1	2nd	48
1966	250cc	ČZ	ESP -	ESP -	FRA; 3	FRA; 2	BEL; 10	BEL; 1	CH; 2	CH; 1	TCH -	TCH; 1	GER; 1	GER; 2	NED; 2	NED; 2	LUX -	LUX; 7	ITA; 3	ITA -	POL; 1	POL; 1	GDR; 1	GDR -	SWE -	SWE -	FIN; 11	FIN -	USR; 3	USR; 2	AUT; 5	AUT; 2	2nd	49
1967	250cc	ČZ	ESP; 10	ESP; 3	CH; 3	CH; 1	FRA; 1	FRA; 1	BEL; 1	BEL; 1	GER; 11	GER -	NED; 2	NED; 1	ITA; 1	ITA; 6	UK; 1	UK; 1	SWE -	SWE -	FIN -	FIN -	USR; 2	USR -	POL; 1	POL; 1							2nd	52
1968	250cc	ČZ	ESP; 1	ESP; 4	BEL; 4	BEL -	TCH; 2	TCH; 2	FRA; 1	FRA; 2	NED; 1	NED; 1	GER; 1	GER; 2	LUX; 3	LUX; 1	POL; 1	POL; 2	USR -	USR -	YUG -	YUG; 8	FIN; 2	FIN; 2	SWE; 1	SWE -	UK; 1	UK; 1	AUT; 1	AUT; 1			1st	54
1969	250cc	ČZ	ESP; 1	ESP; 4	CH; 1	CH; 3	YUG; 1	YUG; 1	TCH -	TCH -	POL; 1	POL; 1	GER -	GER -	NED -	NED -	FRA; 1	FRA; 1	UK -	UK -	SWE; 5	SWE -	FIN; 3	FIN; 2	USR; 5	USR; 2							1st	102
1970	250cc	Suzuki	ESP; 1	ESP; 1	FRA; 4	FRA -	BEL; 1	BEL; 2	YUG; 1	YUG; 1	ITA; 1	ITA; 2	USR -	USR -	POL -	POL -	UK; 1	UK; 1	FIN; 2	FIN; 1	GDR; 2	GDR; 3	CH; 1	CH; 5	AUT; 2	AUT; 3							1st	96
1971	250cc	Suzuki	ESP; 1	ESP; 1	CH; 1	CH; 1	POL; 4	POL -	GER; 1	GER -	YUG; 1	YUG; 1	ITA; 1	ITA; 1	NED; 1	NED; 2	GDR; 1	GDR; 1	FIN; 2	FIN; 2	SWE; 1	SWE; 1	UK; 1	UK; 1	AUT; 2	AUT; 2							1st	105
1972	250cc	Suzuki	ESP; 1	ESP -	FRA; 1	FRA; 1	NED; 1	NED; 2	TCH; 1	TCH; 5	YUG; 1	YUG; 1	GER; 1	GER; 1	POL; 1	POL; 1	USR; 2	USR; 1	FIN -	FIN -	SWE -	SWE -	UK -	UK -	CH; 1	CH; 30							1st	105
1973	250cc	Suzuki	ESP -	ESP -	ITA -	ITA -	BEL -	BEL -	CH; 10	CH; 5	POL -	POL -	YUG -	YUG -	FRA -	FRA -	FIN -	FIN; 4	USR -	USR -	SWE -	SWE -	AUT -	AUT -									18th	15
1974	250cc	Suzuki	ESP; 5	ESP; 9	ITA; 4	ITA -	TCH -	TCH -	POL; 7	POL -	YUG -	YUG -	UK; 9	UK -	GER; 4	GER; 1	NED -	NED -	FIN -	FIN -	SWE; 3	SWE; 8	CH -	CH -									10th	58
1975	250cc	Suzuki	ESP; 8	ESP; 7	AUT; 2	AUT; 3	BEL; 6	BEL; 8	TCH; 3	TCH -	POL -	POL -	YUG; 10	YUG; 3	GER; 4	GER; 7	UK; 4	UK -	FRA; 8	FRA; 7	SWE -	SWE -	FIN -	FIN -	CH -	CH -							9th	84
1976	250cc	Puch	ESP -	ESP; 8	BEL; 9	BEL; 6	TCH -	TCH -	POL -	POL -	USR -	USR -	YUG; 10	YUG; 10	ITA -	ITA -	FRA -	FRA -	UK; 8	UK; 5	GER -	GER -	NED -	NED -	SWE -	SWE -							17th	21
