= Česká zbrojovka Strakonice =

Czech industrial manufacturer

Coordinates: 49°14′51.16″N 13°54′31.37″E

Česká zbrojovka a.s.
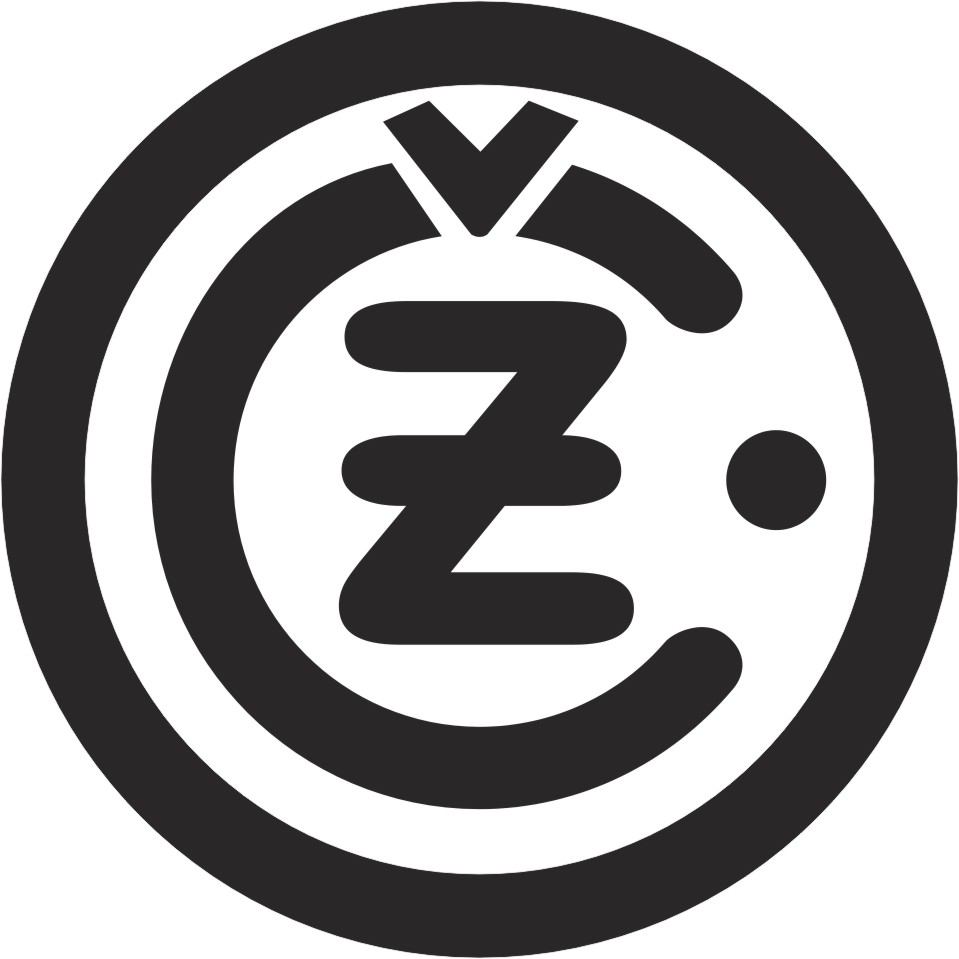

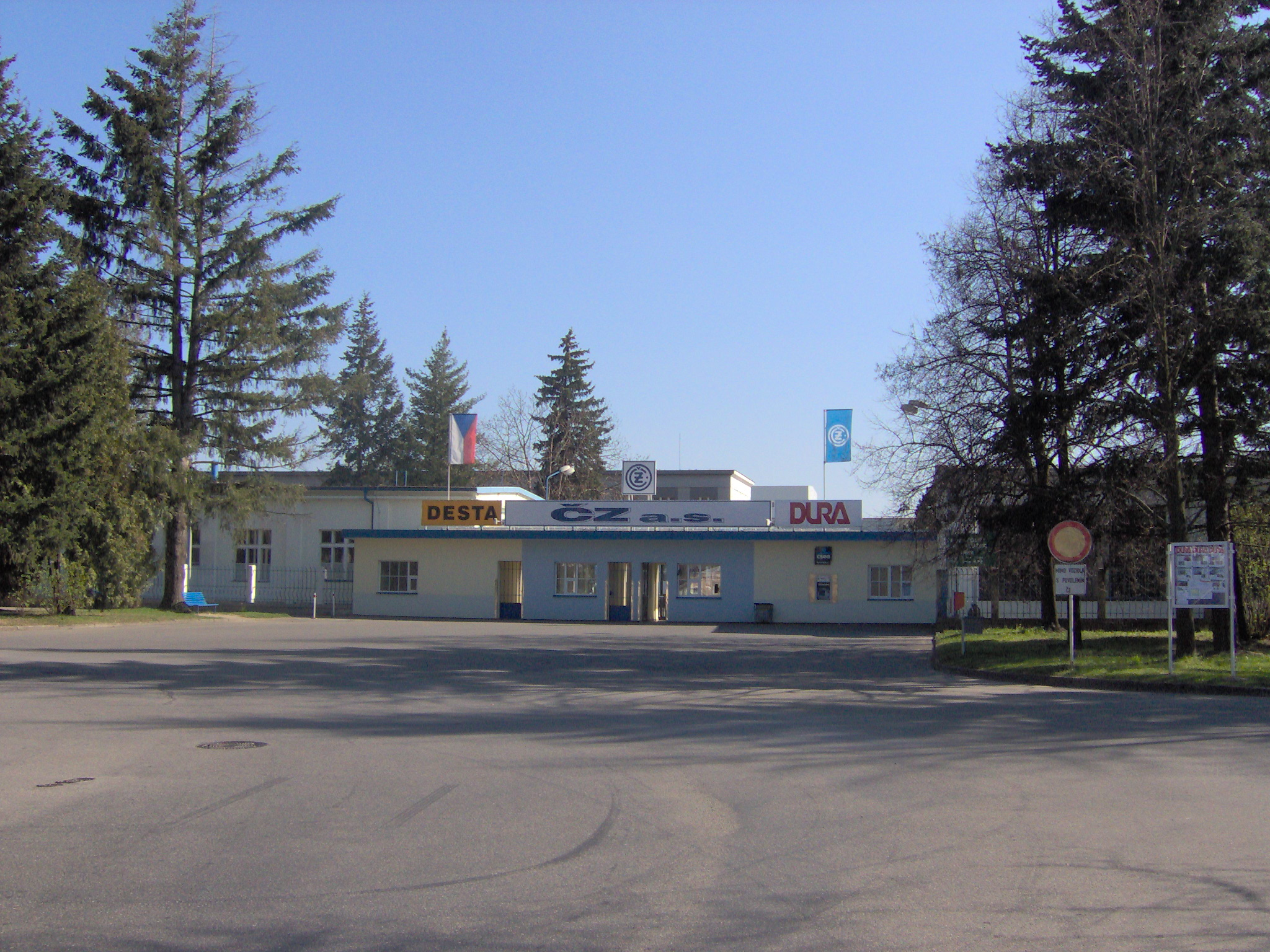
- Type: Joint-stock company
- Founded: 1919; 107 years ago
- Headquarters: Sluneční náměstí 2540/5, Prague 13, 158 00, Czech Republic
- Total assets: 2,165,963,000 Czech koruna (2017)
- Website: czas.cz

Česká zbrojovka a.s. (ČZ a.s.) is a Czech company producing cs:Desta forklifts and components for the automobile industry. It is a former firearms manufacturer, also known for making ČZ motorcycles. ČZ was established as a branch of the Škoda armament works in Strakonice, Czechoslovakia in September 1919.

== History ==
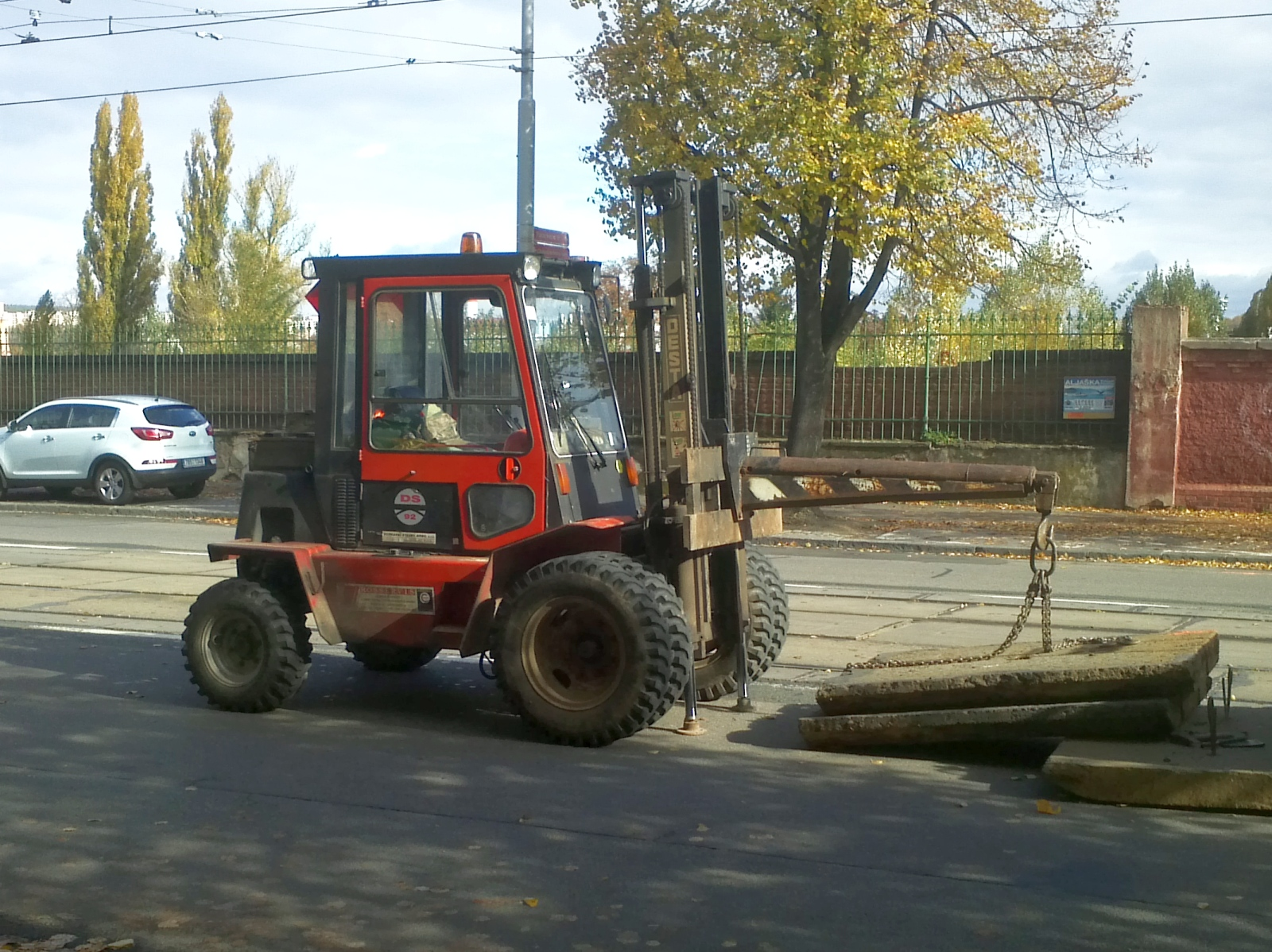
cs:Desta forklift

Work started on the construction of the first workshops of the arms factory originally called Jihočeská zbrojovka ('South Bohemian Armament Works'). The company merged with an arms manufacturing plant in Vejprty and with a factory in Prague in 1922. This gave rise to the formation of a stock company whose name translates as "Czech Armament Works in Prague of the Manufacturing Plant in Strakonice". It produced pistols, air guns, and automatic guns which all became successful products.

In 1929, the growth of the Czech Armament Works reached a turning point. With the downturn in weapons sales after World War I, the company acquired a bicycle parts manufacturing plant in Kralupy nad Vltavou on the Vltava River. Bicycle exports destined for several countries in Europe, Asia, Africa and South America started to expand. Production of motor-driven bicycles started in 1932. Three years later, the first motorcycles made in Strakonice entered the market. This marked the beginning of an era of great success for the ČZ brand. In a short time, the company became the biggest manufacturer of motorcycles in Czechoslovakia. Consequently, business success resulted in a further extension of production activities by introducing chain and machine tool production. In World War II, the factory came under German occupation and was converted to the manufacture of war materials.

Like most large industrial enterprises, this stock company was nationalized in 1946. Due to the post-war political situation, firearms production in the Strakonice plant was ended.

The company changed after the motorcycle brand went out of production in the 1990s and started focusing on manufacturing car components, like turbochargers, besides its traditional production of chains, tools, moulds, castings, and machine tools. Since 1999, cs:Desta forklifts have been manufactured in ČZ Strakonice.

== Motorcycle development ==
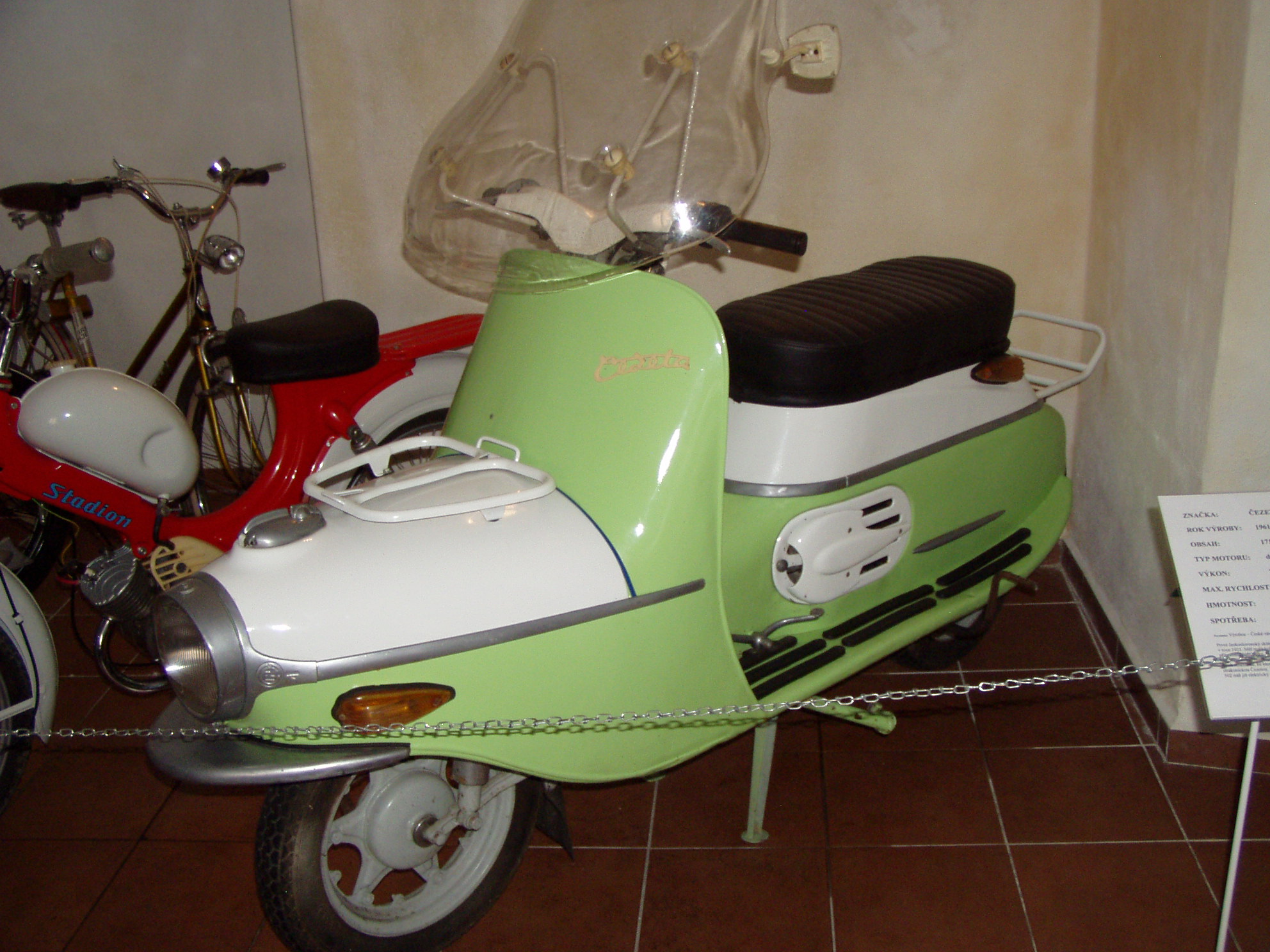
ČZ 501 Čezeta (1957–1960)

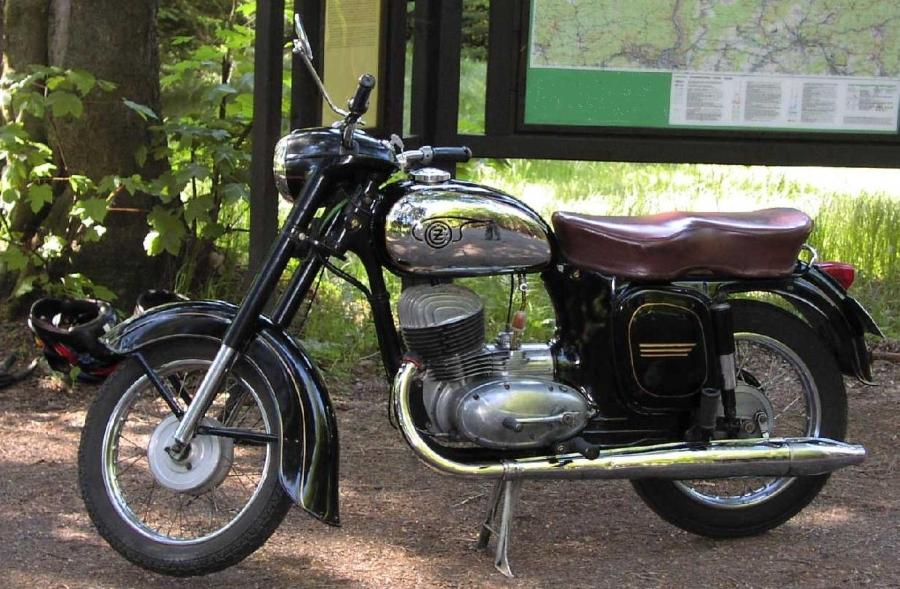
ČZ 250 model 455 (1961–1965)

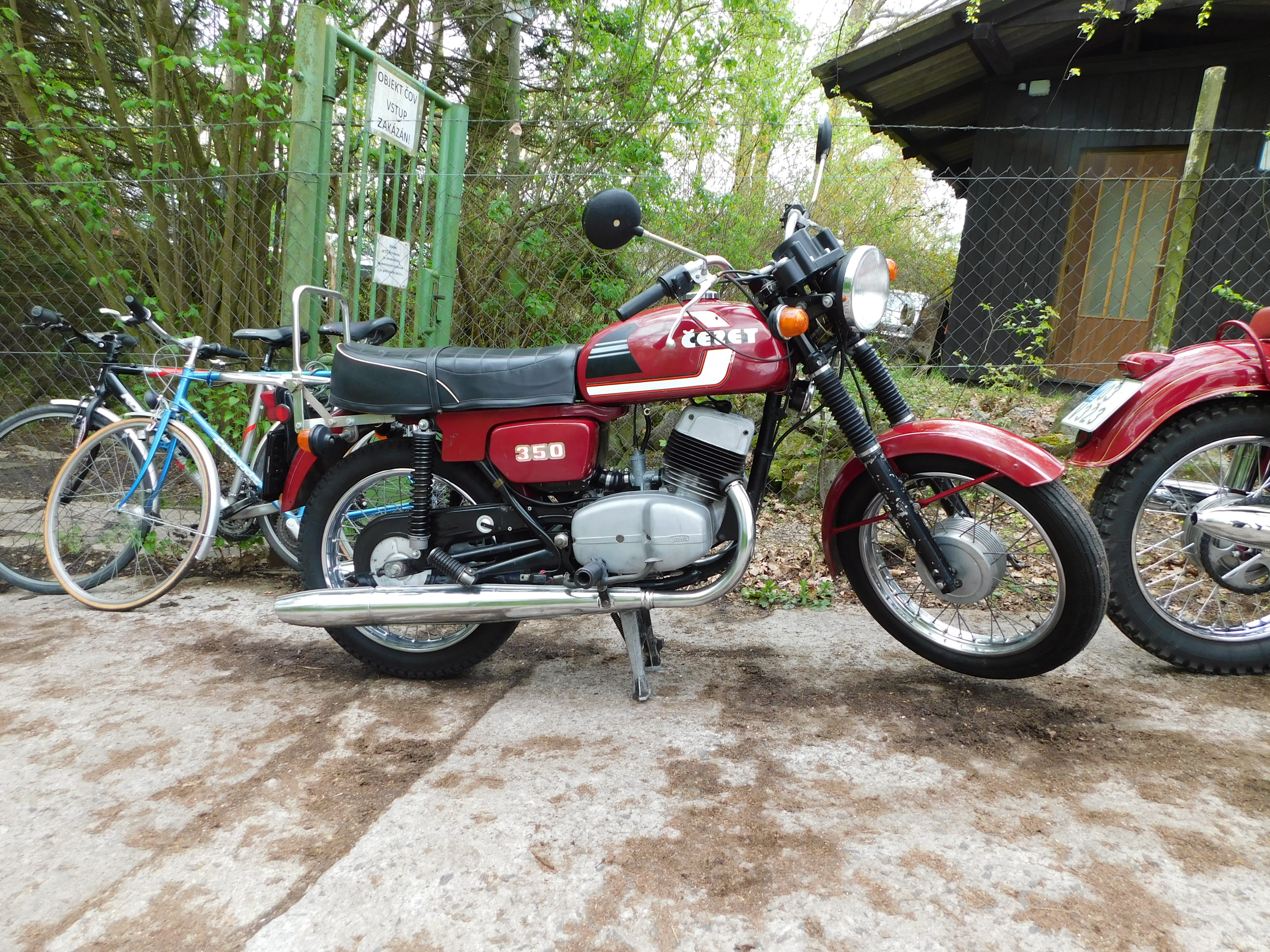
ČZ 350 model 472 (1976–1993)

Motorcycle development and production, as well as competition victories in the 1950s and 1960s, enabled the ČZ brand to be among the world's most successful makers of competition and street motorcycles. After World War II, ČZ was the second-largest motorcycle manufacturer in Europe. It was in this period that the company experienced its greatest racing successes. It began competing in the 250 cc and 350 cc classes of Grand Prix motorcycle road racing. These bikes, although technically refined, were rarely very competitive with bikes from the powerful Italian factories such as MV Agusta, Gilera and Mondial.

The ČZ 501 Čezeta (1957) scooter design has become iconic throughout Eastern Europe, Russia, Vietnam and Cuba. Čezeta thus became Vespa of these Republics.

The ČZ factory recorded an historic victory in the 1963 FIM Motocross World Championship when factory rider Vlastimil Válek rode a 263cc ČZ motorcycle to win the first moto of the 500cc Czechoslovak Motocross Grand Prix. His victory marked the first time that a two-stroke powered motorcycle had won the premier division of the Motocross World Championships.

In the 1969, ČZ made the technically advanced "Type-860" GP model with a 350 cc V4 engine, developed by the engineer František Pudil. This advanced bike, with dual overhead camshaft, 16 valves, 8-speed gearbox, Ceriani forks and Dell'Orto SSI carburetors, produced 63 horsepower (47 kW) at 16,000 rpm with a maximum speed of 240 km/h. The V-4 achieved several good results: the best being in 1971, at the Czechoslovak Grand Prix when Bohumil Staša finished second behind Jarno Saarinen on his 350 cc Yamaha. In 1972, the bike almost won the Austrian Grand Prix. With just a few laps to go in the race, the ČZ was leading Giacomo Agostini's MV Agusta when it had to retire with mechanical problems. In 1972, ČZ abandoned Grand Prix road racing competitions to concentrate its efforts on motocross, a less expensive form of competition.

ČZ proved to be much more successful with motocross and became well known for its powerful two-stroke off-road motorcycles. They were the first company to use expansion chambers in their exhaust pipes. In the 1960s, they became the dominant force in off-road competition, winning seven Grand Prix motocross World Championships and dominating the International Six Day Trial.

By the 1970s, with the advent of inexpensive and technically advanced Japanese motorcycles, ČZ lost an increasing share of the motorcycle market. Ironically, many of the innovations successfully pioneered by ČZ were copied by the Japanese factories. In 1993, the motorcycle branch of ČZ was bought by the Italian motorcycle manufacturer Cagiva, who intended to use the Czech factories to build their own brand of motorcycles as well as new ČZ and Jawa models. The venture failed in 1997 due to Cagiva's financial difficulties, and the ČZ motorcycle brand went out of production.

Since 2018, the company Čezeta Motors is producing electric scooters Čezeta 506.

== Competition history ==
=== Motocross World Championships ===
- 1964 250 cc Motocross - Joël Robert, Belgium
- 1965 250 cc Motocross - Victor Arbekov, Russia
- 1966 500 cc Motocross - Paul Friedrichs, East Germany
- 1967 500 cc Motocross - Paul Friedrichs, East Germany
- 1968 500 cc Motocross - Paul Friedrichs, East Germany
- 1968 250 cc Motocross - Joël Robert, Belgium
- 1969 250 cc Motocross - Joël Robert, Belgium

=== International Six Day Trials victories ===
- 1947 Trophy - Team Czechoslovakia
- 1952 Trophy - Team Czechoslovakia
- 1954 Trophy - Team Czechoslovakia
- 1956 Trophy - Team Czechoslovakia
- 1958 Trophy - Team Czechoslovakia
- 1959 Trophy - Team Czechoslovakia
- 1962 Trophy - Team Czechoslovakia
- 1970 Trophy - Team Czechoslovakia
- 1971 Trophy - Team Czechoslovakia
- 1972 Trophy - Team Czechoslovakia
- 1973 Trophy - Team Czechoslovakia
- 1974 Trophy - Team Czechoslovakia
- 1977 Trophy - Team Czechoslovakia
- 1978 Trophy - Team Czechoslovakia
- 1982 Trophy - Team Czechoslovakia
