= 1962 Motocross World Championship =

Motocross championship season

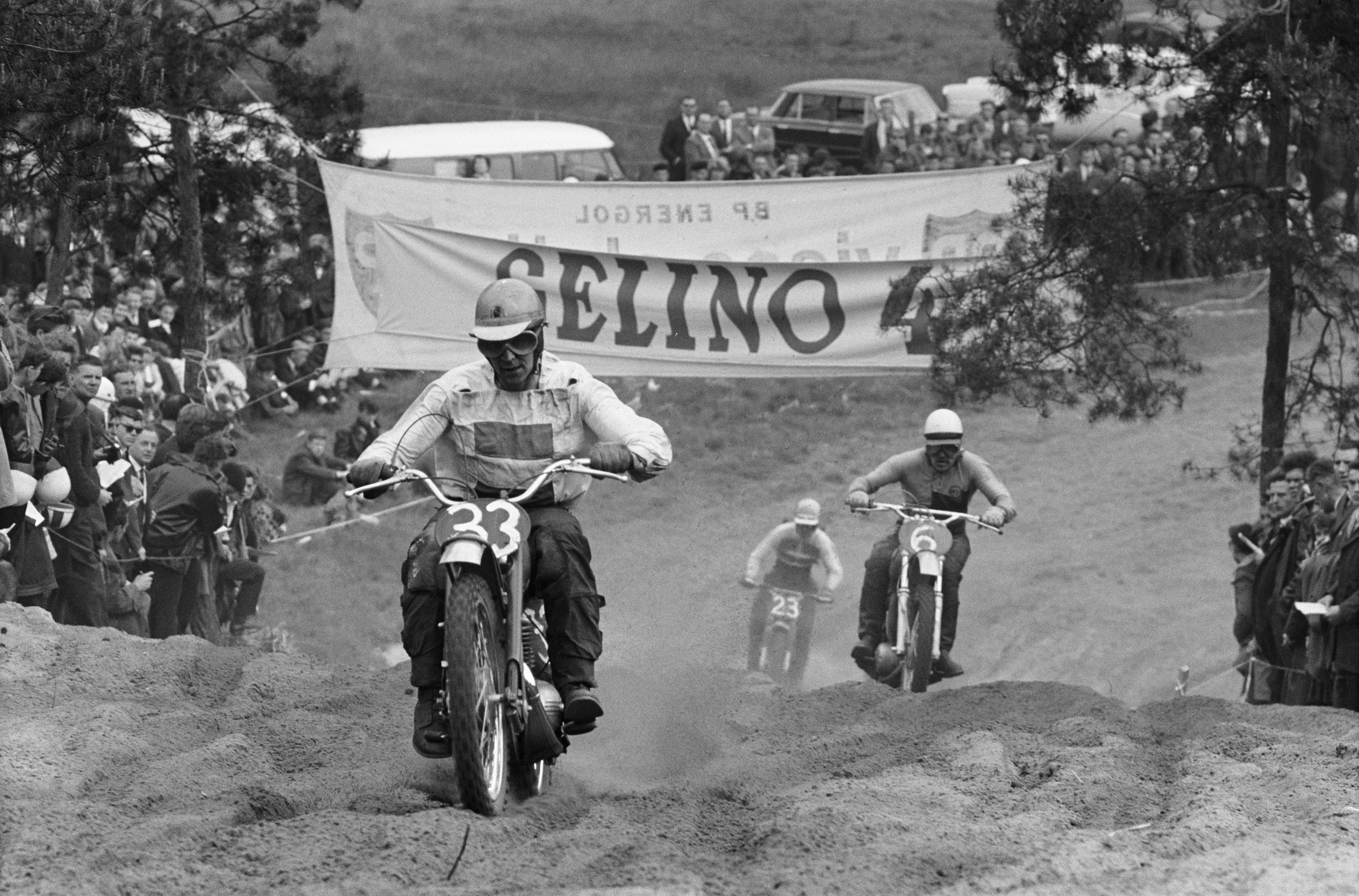
- Action from the 500cc Swiss Grand Prix on 3 June 1962 in Bremgarten, Switzerland.
- Organizer: FIM
- Duration: 26 February/9 September
- Number of races: 25
- Number of manufacturers: 16

Champions
- 500cc: (Sweden) Rolf Tibblin
- 250cc (Note: Upgraded to World Championship.): (Sweden) Torsten Hallman

Motocross World Championship
- ← 1961 1963 →

The 1962 Motocross World Championship was the 6th edition of the Motocross World Championship organized by the FIM and reserved for 500cc and 250cc motorcycles.

The FIM upgraded the 250cc European Motocross Championship to World Championship status for the 1962 season.

== Summary ==
The Husqvarna team's Rolf Tibblin won five Grand Prix races en route to claiming the first 500cc motocross world championship of his career. Swedish competitors dominated the championship, with Swedes taking the top five places in the championship.

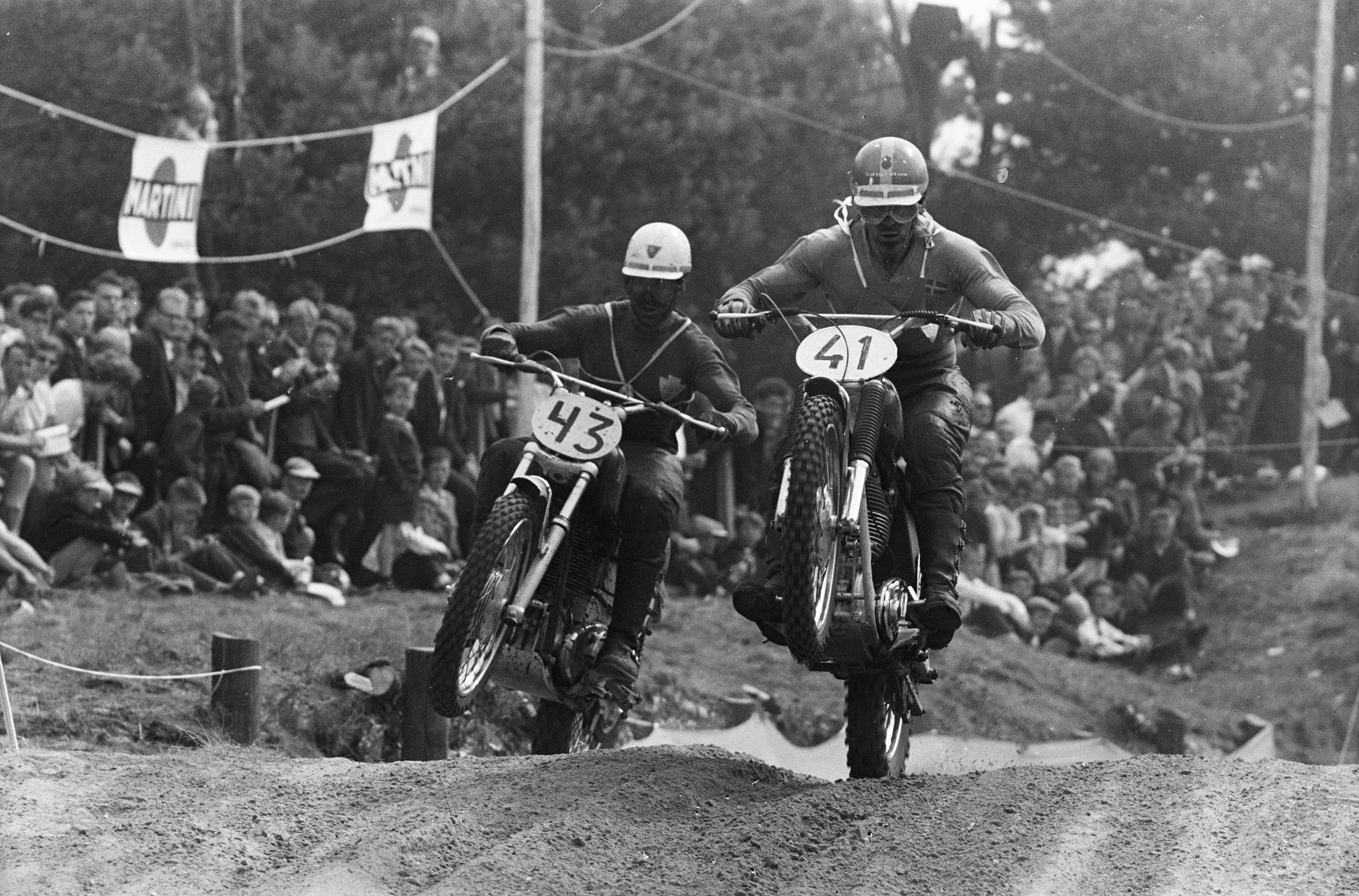
Rolf Tibblin (41) leads Gunnar Johansson (43) at the 500cc Dutch Grand Prix on 29 July 1962.

Husqvarna also triumphed in the new 250cc motocross world championship, with Torsten Hallman winning his first world title ahead of BSA teammates Jeff Smith and Arthur Lampkin. The Greeves factory chose not to compete in the new championship, keeping two-time European motocross champion Dave Bickers at home to compete in the British championship. However, Bickers did compete in the British round of the 250cc motocross World Championship, claiming the victory at the British Grand Prix. Future six-time World Champion Joël Robert made his first World Championship appearance with a fourth-place at the 250cc Swiss Grand Prix. The ČZ factory took its first victory when factory-sponsored Vlastimil Válek won the Czechoslovak Grand Prix, heralding a decade of dominance by the Czechoslovak manufacturer.

== Grands Prix ==
=== 500cc ===
Round	Date	Grand Prix	Location	Race 1 Winner	Race 2 Winner	Overall Winner	Report
1	April 15	(Austria) Austrian Grand Prix	Sittendorf	(Sweden) Rolf Tibblin	(Sweden) Ove Lundell	(Sweden) Rolf Tibblin	Report
2	May 20	(France) French Grand Prix	Pernes-les-Fontaines	(Sweden) Rolf Tibblin	(Sweden) Rolf Tibblin	(Sweden) Rolf Tibblin	Report
3	June 3	(Switzerland) Swiss Grand Prix	Bremgarten	(Sweden) Gunnar Johansson	(Sweden) Rolf Tibblin	(Sweden) Gunnar Johansson	Report
4	June 10	(Italy) Italian Grand Prix	Imola	(Sweden) Gunnar Johansson	(Sweden) Bill Nilsson	(Sweden) Rolf Tibblin	Report
5	June 24	(Czech Republic) Czechoslovak Grand Prix	Přerov	(Sweden) Gunnar Johansson	(Sweden) Ove Lundell	(Sweden) Gunnar Johansson	Report
6	July 1	(United Kingdom) British Grand Prix	Hawkstone Park	(Sweden) Rolf Tibblin	(Sweden) Rolf Tibblin	(Sweden) Rolf Tibblin	Report
7	July 29	(Netherlands) Dutch Grand Prix	Lichtenvoorde	(Sweden) Gunnar Johansson	(Sweden) Rolf Tibblin	(Sweden) Rolf Tibblin	Report
8	August 5	(Belgium) Belgian Grand Prix	Namur	(Sweden) Gunnar Johansson	(United Kingdom) John Burton	(United Kingdom) John Burton	Report
9	August 12	Luxembourg Grand Prix	Ettelbruck	(Sweden) Bill Nilsson	(Sweden) Gunnar Johansson	(Sweden) Bill Nilsson	Report
10	August 19	(Sweden) Swedish Grand Prix	Knutstorp	(United Kingdom) Jeff Smith	(Sweden) Bill Nilsson	(United Kingdom) Jeff Smith	Report

=== 250cc ===
Round	Date	Grand Prix	Location	Race 1 Winner	Race 2 Winner	Overall Winner	Report
1	February 26	(Spain) Spanish Grand Prix	Ruta	(United Kingdom) Don Rickman	(United Kingdom) Jeff Smith	(United Kingdom) Arthur Lampkin	Report
2	April 8	(Switzerland) Swiss Grand Prix	Lausanne	(United Kingdom) Arthur Lampkin	(United Kingdom) Jeff Smith	(United Kingdom) Jeff Smith	Report
3	April 29	(Belgium) Belgian Grand Prix	Loppem	(Sweden) Torsten Hallman	(United Kingdom) Arthur Lampkin	(United Kingdom) Arthur Lampkin	Report
4	May 6	(France) French Grand Prix	Saint Quentin	(Sweden) Torsten Hallman	(United Kingdom) Jeff Smith	(Sweden) Torsten Hallman	Report
5	May 20	(Czech Republic) Czechoslovak Grand Prix	Divoká Šárka	(Czech Republic) Vlastimil Válek	(Czech Republic) Vlastimil Válek	(Czech Republic) Vlastimil Válek	Report
6	May 27	(Poland) Polish Grand Prix	Katowice-Zabrze	(United Kingdom) Jeff Smith	(United Kingdom) Jeff Smith	(United Kingdom) Jeff Smith	Report
7	June 3	(Netherlands) Dutch Grand Prix	Bergharen	(United Kingdom) Jeff Smith	(United Kingdom) Jeff Smith	(United Kingdom) Jeff Smith	Report
8	June 10	Luxembourg Grand Prix	Schifflange	(Sweden) Torsten Hallman	(Sweden) Torsten Hallman	(Sweden) Torsten Hallman	Report
9	June 17	(Finland) Finnish Grand Prix	Ruskeasanta	(Finland) Aarno Erola	(United Kingdom) Jeff Smith	(Finland) Aarno Erola	Report
10	June 24	(Soviet Union) Russian Grand Prix	Leningrad	(Sweden) Torsten Hallman	(Sweden) Torsten Hallman	(Sweden) Torsten Hallman	Report
11	July 1	(Germany) West German Grand Prix	Bielstein	(Sweden) Torsten Hallman	(Sweden) Torsten Hallman	(Sweden) Torsten Hallman	Report
12	July 8	(Italy) Italian Grand Prix	Gallarate	(Sweden) Torsten Hallman	(Sweden) Torsten Hallman	(Sweden) Torsten Hallman	Report
13	July 15	(United Kingdom) British Grand Prix	Glastonbury	(United Kingdom) Dave Bickers	(United Kingdom) Dave Bickers	(United Kingdom) Dave Bickers	Report
14	September 2	(Sweden) Swedish Grand Prix	Enköping	(Sweden) Torsten Hallman	(Sweden) Torsten Hallman	(Sweden) Torsten Hallman	Report
15	September 9	(East Germany) East German Grand Prix	Apolda	(Sweden) Torsten Hallman	(Sweden) Torsten Hallman	(Sweden) Torsten Hallman	Report

== Final standings ==
Points are awarded to the top 6 classified finishers. For the final championship standings, half of the competitors' results + 1 are retained. Thus with 10 500cc Grand Prix, the 6 best results are retained, and with 15 250cc Grand Prix, the 7 best results are retained.

Position	1st	2nd	3rd	4th	5th	6th
Points	8	6	4	3	2	1

=== 500cc ===
(Results in italics indicate overall winner)

Pos	Rider	Machine	AUT (Austria)		FRA (France)		CH (Switzerland)		ITA (Italy)		TCH (Czechoslovakia)		UK (United Kingdom)		NED (Netherlands)		BEL (Belgium)		LUX (Luxembourg)		SWE (Sweden)		Pts
Pos	Rider	Machine	R1	R2	R1	R2	R1	R2	R1	R2	R1	R2	R1	R2	R1	R2	R1	R2	R1	R2	R1	R2	Pts
1	(Sweden) Rolf Tibblin	Husqvarna	1	2	1	1	3	1	2	2	-	-	1	1	2	1*	2	2	6	-	3	-	45
2	(Sweden) Gunnar Johansson	Lito	6	6	6	9	1	2	1	3	1	2	3	2	1	2*	1	6	3	1	-	8	41
3	(Sweden) Sten Lundin	Lito	3	4	2	2	2	3	4	7	2	4	-	-	7	6	6	4	2	3	6	1	27
4	(Sweden) Ove Lundell	Monark	4	1	22	27	4	4	27	6	3	1	-	-	5	3	-	-	5	4	4	5	25
5	(Sweden) Bill Nilsson	Lito	2	3	3	3	-	-	7	1	-	-	4	-	4	9	5	9	1	2	8	2	23
6	(United Kingdom) John Burton	BSA	7	7	4	4	-	-	-	-	-	-	7	-	11	-	3	1	4	5	-	-	14
7	(United Kingdom) Jeff Smith	BSA	-	-	-	-	-	-	-	-	-	-	-	-	-	-	4	-	7	7	1	3	9
8	(Netherlands) Broer Dirk	BSA	5	5	26	-	-	-	5	4	-	-	-	-	3	5	-	-	-	-	-	-	8
9	(Sweden) Per Olaf Persson	Monark	-	-	5	7	-	-	-	-	-	-	6	6	-	-	-	-	10	8	-	-	5
9	(Sweden) Lars Gustavsson	Lito	-	-	-	5	-	-	-	-	-	-	-	-	6	4	-	-	-	-	5	4	5
11	(United Kingdom) Don Rickman	Triumph-Métisse	-	-	-	-	-	-	-	-	-	-	2	3	-	-	-	-	-	-	-	-	4
12	(Czech Republic) Miloslav Soucek	ESO	-	-	-	-	-	-	-	-	4	3	-	-	-	-	-	-	-	-	-	-	3
12	(United Kingdom) Arthur Lampkin	BSA	-	-	-	-	-	-	-	-	-	-	-	-	-	-	7	3	17	-	-	-	3
14	(Belgium) Walter Baeten	ESO	-	-	-	-	6	5	-	8	-	-	-	-	-	-	14	-	-	-	-	-	2
14	(Belgium) Hubert Scaillet	Triumph-Métisse	-	-	-	-	-	-	6	5	-	-	-	-	8	7	8	15	14	6	7	7	2
14	(Czech Republic) Ervín Krajčovič	ESO	-	-	-	-	-	-	-	-	6	5	-	-	-	-	-	-	-	-	-	-	2
14	(United Kingdom) Dave Bickers	Greeves	-	-	-	-	-	-	-	-	-	-	9	5	-	-	-	-	-	-	-	-	2
18	(Denmark) Mogens Rasmussen	BSA	-	-	-	-	-	-	-	-	7	6	-	-	-	-	-	-	-	-	2	9	2
19	(Switzerland) Albert Courajod	Norton	-	-	-	-	5	7	-	-	-	-	-	-	-	-	-	-	-	-	-	-	1
19	(United Kingdom) Gordon Blakeway	Triumph	-	-	-	-	-	-	-	-	-	-	11	7	-	-	-	-	-	-	-	-	1
-	(France) André Chuchart	Triumph				6																	0
-	(Switzerland) Pierre André Rapin	BSA						6															0
-	(United Kingdom) Les Archer Jr.	Norton							3														0
-	(Czech Republic) Josef Hrebecek	ESO									5												0
-	(United Kingdom) Derek Rickman	Triumph-Métisse											5										0
-	(Belgium) Roger Vanderbeken	Triumph												4									0
-	(Belgium) Herman De Soete	Matchless																5					0
-	(Sweden) Karl Ingemar Larsson	Lito																			9	6	0
*An FIM Jury at the Dutch Grand Prix ruled that Tibblin and Johansson should be awarded 7 points each by combining first and second place points then dividing by two. 8+6= 14; 14/2 = 7 points. Sources:

=== 250cc ===
(Results in italics indicate overall winner)

Pos	Rider	Machine	ESP (Spain)		CH (Switzerland)		BEL (Belgium)		FRA (France)		TCH (Czechoslovakia)		POL (Poland)		NED (Netherlands)		LUX (Luxembourg)		FIN (Finland)		USSR (Soviet Union)		GER (Germany)		ITA (Italy)		UK (United Kingdom)		SWE (Sweden)		GDR (East Germany)		Pts
Pos	Rider	Machine	R1	R2	R1	R2	R1	R2	R1	R2	R1	R2	R1	R2	R1	R2	R1	R2	R1	R2	R1	R2	R1	R2	R1	R2	R1	R2	R1	R2	R1	R2	Pts
1	(Sweden) Torsten Hallman	Husqvarna	-	-	3	5	1	3	1	2	2	-	-	-	-	-	1	1	7	9	1	1	1	1	1	1	2	2	1	1	1	1	56
2	(United Kingdom) Jeff Smith	BSA	10	1	2	1	18	2	2	1	3	2	1	1	1	1	3	-	5	1	2	2	2	2	2	2	8	3	11	3	3	4	48
3	(United Kingdom) Arthur Lampkin	BSA	3	2	1	2	2	1	7	4	-	-	2	2	15	4	4	6	8	5	3	3	-	-	6	3	17	-	2	11	2	3	42
4	(Czech Republic) Vlastimil Válek	ČZ	-	-	4	28	-	-	3	3	1	1	5	-	-	-	2	2	3	-	5	5	3	4	4	-	4	5	3	4	-	2	31
5	(Czech Republic) Karel Pilar	ČZ	-	-	-	-	-	-	-	-	6	4	-	3	-	-	5	3	2	3	4	4	6	5	5	5	-	9	-	-	-	-	20
6	(Finland) Aarno Erola	Husqvarna	4	-	27	19	5	5	4	-	-	-	-	-	10	12	-	-	1	2	-	-	-	-	7	-	-	6	-	-	-	-	11
7	(Germany) Fritz Betzelbacher	Maico	-	-	5	21	4	4	5	-	-	-	-	-	3	2	6	-	-	-	-	-	-	6	-	-	-	-	-	-	-	-	11
8	(Sweden) Olle Pettersson	Husqvarna	-	-	9	3	7	6	8	6	-	-	-	-	12	8	13	-	-	-	-	-	-	-	-	-	12	10	4	2	-	-	10
9	(Italy) Lanfranco Angelini	Aermacchi	6	4	16	9	8	12	-	-	-	-	-	-	-	-	-	-	-	-	-	-	-	-	3	6	-	-	-	-	-	-	9
10	(United Kingdom) Dave Bickers	Greeves	-	-	-	-	-	-	-	-	-	-	-	-	-	-	-	-	-	-	-	-	-	-	-	-	1	1	-	-	-	-	8
11	(Czech Republic) Jaromír Čížek	Jawa	-	-	-	-	-	-	-	-	4	3	3	-	-	-	-	-	-	-	-	-	-	-	-	-	-	-	-	-	7	7	7
12	(Netherlands) Fritz Selling	Greeves	2	-	19	7	-	-	16	7	-	-	-	-	2	3	10	-	-	-	-	-	-	-	9	4	15	-	-	-	-	-	5
13	(West Germany) Christoph Specht	Maico	8	-	-	-	15	11	24	-	-	-	-	-	-	-	8	5	-	-	-	-	4	3	-	-	-	-	-	-	-	-	5
14	(Soviet Union) Andrei Dezhinov	ESO	-	-	-	-	-	-	-	-	-	-	4	4	13	9	-	-	17	-	-	-	-	-	-	-	-	-	-	-	15	-	4
14	(Soviet Union) Igor Grigoriev	Kovrovec	-	-	11	23	-	-	-	-	-	8	6	-	5	5	-	-	9	7	-	6	-	-	-	-	-	-	-	-	-	-	4
14	(Belgium) Joël Robert	Greeves	-	-	6	4	6	10	23	-	11	5	-	-	8	-	9	-	-	-	-	-	-	-	-	-	13	14	12	7	-	-	4
17	(East Germany) Ernst Wolff	MZ	-	-	-	-	-	-	-	-	-	-	-	-	-	-	-	-	-	-	-	-	-	-	-	-	-	-	-	-	5	6	3
17	(Sweden) Sivert Eriksson	Husqvarna	-	-	-	-	-	-	-	-	-	-	-	-	-	-	-	-	-	-	-	-	-	-	-	-	-	-	5	5	-	-	3
17	(United Kingdom) Alan Clough	Dot	-	-	-	-	-	-	-	-	-	-	-	-	-	-	-	-	-	-	-	-	-	-	-	-	5	4	-	-	-	-	3
17	(Sweden) Stig Rickardsson	Husqvarna	-	-	-	-	-	-	-	-	5	-	-	-	-	-	-	-	6	4	-	-	5	-	12	7	-	-	-	-	-	-	3
17	(Soviet Union) Rainis Resetniks	ESO	-	-	-	-	-	-	-	-	-	-	-	6	14	15	-	-	18	12	-	-	-	-	-	-	-	-	-	-	-	-	3
17	(Spain) Oriol Puig Bulto	Bultaco	11	3	15	12	-	-	-	-	-	-	-	-	-	-	-	-	-	-	-	-	-	-	-	-	26	20	-	-	-	-	3
17	(Belgium) Nic Jansen	Greeves	-	-	26	8	-	7	9	5	-	-	-	-	6	7	-	-	-	-	-	-	-	-	10	-	-	-	13	9	-	-	3
24	(Czech Republic) Vladimír Dubšík	ČZ	-	-	-	-	-	-	-	-	-	-	-	-	-	-	-	-	-	-	-	-	-	-	-	-	-	-	-	-	8	5	2
24	(United Kingdom) Don Rickman	Bultaco-Métisse	1	7	-	-	-	-	-	-	-	-	-	-	-	-	-	-	-	-	-	-	-	-	-	-	3	7	-	-	-	-	2
24	(Belgium) André Piron	Greeves	-	-	-	-	11	-	-	-	-	-	-	-	-	-	7	4	-	-	-	-	-	-	-	-	-	-	-	-	-	-	2
24	(Netherlands) Simon Schram	Maico	-	-	-	-	-	-	-	-	-	-	-	-	4	6	-	-	-	-	-	-	-	-	-	-	-	-	-	-	-	-	2
24	(Czech Republic) Frantisek Ron	Jawa	-	-	-	-	-	-	-	-	8	6	-	-	-	-	-	-	-	-	-	-	-	-	-	-	-	-	-	-	9	8	2
24	(Norway) Tore Lundby	Husqvarna	-	-	-	-	3	8	-	-	-	-	-	-	-	-	-	-	-	6	-	-	-	-	-	-	-	-	-	-	-	-	2
24	(France) Franck Lucas	Greeves	8	5	-	-	-	-	-	-	-	-	-	-	-	-	-	-	-	-	-	-	-	-	-	-	-	-	-	-	-	-	2
31	(Sweden) Jan Johansson	Husqvarna	-	-	-	-	-	-	-	-	-	-	-	-	-	-	-	-	-	-	-	-	-	-	-	-	-	-	8	6	-	-	1
31	(Soviet Union) Sergei Kaduskin	ESO	-	-	-	-	-	-	-	-	-	-	-	-	-	-	-	-	-	-	6	8	-	-	-	-	-	-	-	-	-	-	1
31	(Sweden) Jan Blomqvist	Husqvarna	5	-	-	-	-	-	-	-	-	-	-	5	-	-	-	-	-	-	-	-	-	-	-	-	-	-	9	14	-	-	1
31	(West Germany) Gerhard Stauch	Maico	-	-	8	6	-	-	-	-	14	10	-	-	-	-	-	-	-	-	-	-	-	-	-	-	-	-	-	-	-	-	1
-	(East Germany) Paul Friedrichs	MZ	-	-	-	-	-	-	-	-	9	11	-	-	-	-	-	-	-	-	-	-	-	-	-	-	-	-	21	-	4	-	0
