= 1959 Motocross World Championship =

Motocross championship season

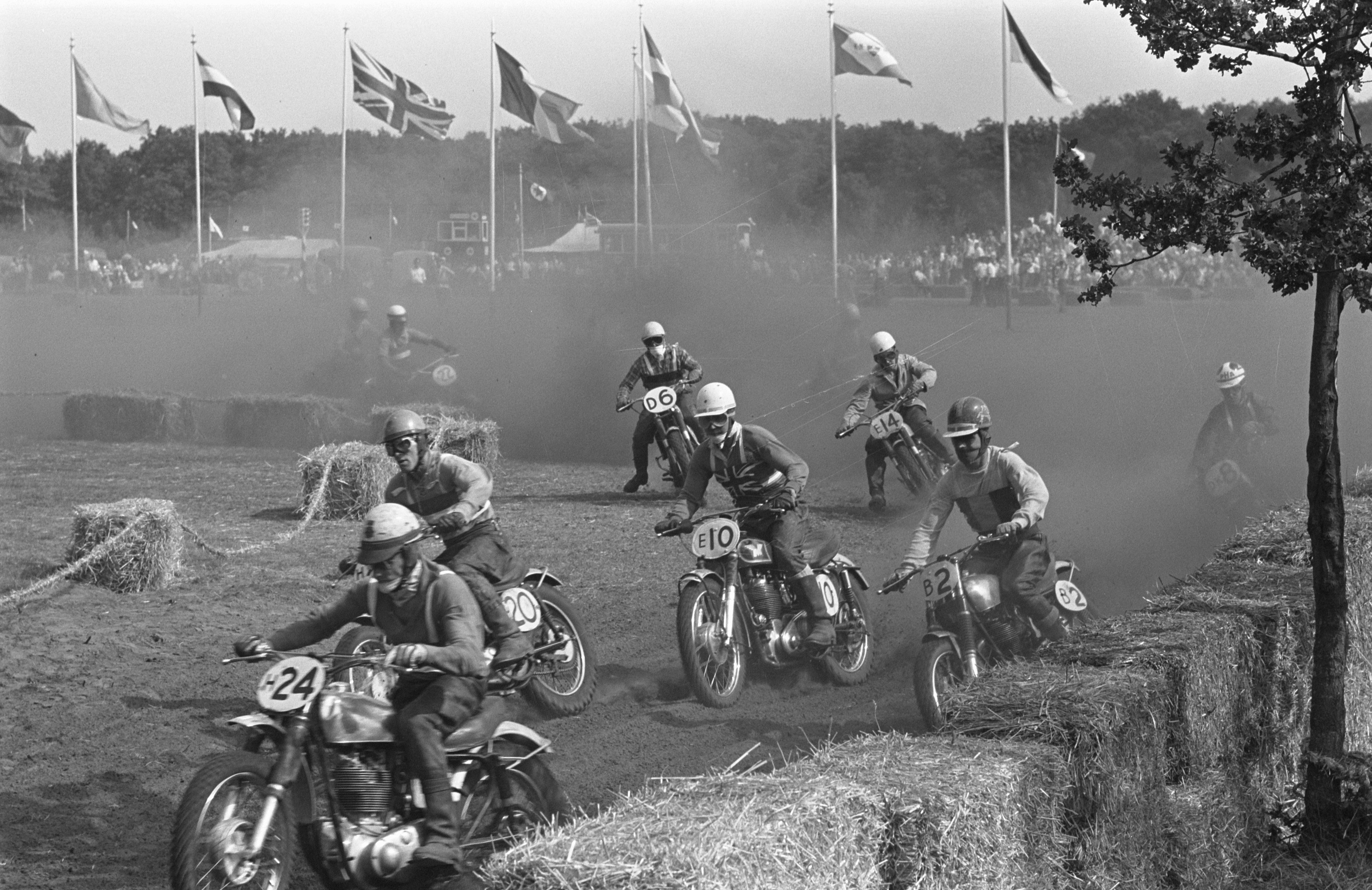
- Action from the 1959 500cc Dutch Grand Prix, held in Norg on 26 July 1959.
- Organizer: FIM
- Duration: 12 April/26 August
- Number of races: 11
- Number of manufacturers: 8

Champions
- 500cc: (Sweden) Sten Lundin
- 250cc (Note: Now called the European Championship.): (Sweden) Rolf Tibblin

Motocross World Championship
- ← 1958 1960 →

The 1959 Motocross World Championship was the 3rd edition of the Motocross World Championship organized by the FIM and reserved for 500cc motorcycles.

== Summary ==
After five editions of the European Championship, from 1952 to 1956, the championship from 1957 took the name of the World Championship, at least for the 500cc class. The 250cc class, introduced this season, will also dispute five running-in seasons, from 1957 to 1961, a period in which it will take on the name of the European Cup, to become World Championship as well starting from the 1962 season.

From April 12 to August 23, the 500cc class held 9 grands prix which awarded points to the first six classified competitors, respectively: 8, 6, 4, 3, 2, 1. The score in the final classification of each competitor was calculated on the best four results.

== Grands Prix ==
=== 500cc ===
Round	Date	Grand Prix	Location	Winner	Team	Report
1	April 12	(Austria) Austrian Grand Prix	Sittendorf	(Sweden) Sten Lundin	Monark	Report
2	April 26	(Switzerland) Swiss Grand Prix	Geneva	(Sweden) Bill Nilsson	Crescent-AJS	Report
3	May 10	(Denmark) Danish Grand Prix	Rjenberg	(United Kingdom) Les Archer Jr.	Norton	Report
4	May 17	(France) French Grand Prix	Mayenne	(United Kingdom) Les Archer Jr.	Norton	Report
5	June 14	(Italy) Italian Grand Prix	Imola	(Sweden) Sten Lundin	Monark	Report
6	June 21	(Germany) West German Grand Prix	Bielstein	(Sweden) Sten Lundin	Monark	Report
7	July 5	(United Kingdom) British Grand Prix	Shrewsbury	(United Kingdom) Jeff Smith	BSA	Report
8	July 26	(Netherlands) Dutch Grand Prix	Norg	(Netherlands) Broer Dirkx	BSA	Report
9	August 2	(Belgium) Belgian Grand Prix	Des Houlpaix - Jupille	(Sweden) Bill Nilsson	Crescent-AJS	Report
10	August 9	Luxembourg Grand Prix	Ettelbruck	(Sweden) Sten Lundin	Monark	Report
11	August 23	(Sweden) Swedish Grand Prix	Saxtorp	(Sweden) Bill Nilsson	Crescent-AJS	Report

=== 250cc ===
Round	Date	Grand Prix	Location	Winner	Team	Report
1	April 12	(Austria) Austrian Grand Prix	Sittendorf	(Czech Republic) Miloslav Soucek	ESO	Report
2	May 11	(Switzerland) Swiss Grand Prix	Geneva	(United Kingdom) Brian Stonebridge	Greeves	Report
3	April 26	(Belgium) Belgian Grand Prix	Ypres	(Czech Republic) Jaromír Čížek	Jawa	Report
4	May 17	(East Germany) East German Grand Prix	Teterow	(Czech Republic) Jaromír Čížek	Jawa	Report
5	May 24	(Czech Republic) Czechoslovak Grand Prix	Divoká Šárka	(Czech Republic) Jaromír Čížek	Jawa	Report
6	May 31	(Poland) Polish Grand Prix	Katowice-Zabrze	(Czech Republic) Jaromír Čížek	Jawa	Report
7	June 7	(Germany) West German Grand Prix	Ludweiler	(Sweden) Rolf Tibblin	Husqvarna	Report
8	June 21	(Italy) Italian Grand Prix	Pinerolo	(United Kingdom) Brian Stonebridge	Greeves	Report
9	June 28	(France) French Grand Prix	Cassel	(Sweden) Rolf Tibblin	Husqvarna	Report
10	July 12	(Netherlands) Dutch Grand Prix	Lichtenvoorde	(Sweden) Rolf Tibblin	Husqvarna	Report
11	July 19	(United Kingdom) British Grand Prix	Beenhan Park	(Sweden) Rolf Tibblin	Husqvarna	Report
12	August 9	Luxembourg Grand Prix	Ettelbruck	(Sweden) Rolf Tibblin	Husqvarna	Report
13	August 16	(Sweden) Swedish Grand Prix	Vetlanda	(Sweden) Rolf Tibblin	Husqvarna	Report

== Final standings ==
=== 500cc ===
Points are awarded to the top 6 classified finishers. For the final championship standings, half of the competitors' results + 1 are retained. Thus with 11 500cc Grand Prix, the 6 best results are retained. With 13 250cc Grand Prix, the 7 best results are retained.

Position	1st	2nd	3rd	4th	5th	6th
Points	8	6	4	3	2	1

Pos	Rider	Machine	AUT (Austria)	CH (Switzerland)	DEN (Denmark)	FRA (France)	ITA (Italy)	GER (West Germany)	UK (United Kingdom)	NED (Netherlands)	BEL (Belgium)	LUX (Luxembourg)	SWE (Sweden)	Pts
1	(Sweden) Sten Lundin	Monark	1	2		3	1	1		4	2	1	4	44
2	(Sweden) Bill Nilsson	Crescent-AJS 7R	4	1		2		4			1		1	36
3	(United Kingdom) Dave Curtis	Matchless		4		5		2	2	2	3	4	3	34
4	(Netherlands) Broer Dirkx	BSA	2	6	3			3	4	1			6	27
5	(United Kingdom) Les Archer Jr.	Norton		3	1	1					4			23
6	(United Kingdom) Jeff Smith	BSA				4	6	5	1		6	2		21
7	(United Kingdom) Don Rickman	Triumph-Métisse					3		3			3		12
8	(Sweden) Lars Gustavsson	Monark						6	6	3			2	12
9	(Belgium) René Baeten	AJS 7R special			2					6		5		9
10	(United Kingdom) Derek Rickman	Triumph-Métisse					2							6
11	(Belgium) Hubert Scaillet	Matchless	3									6		5
12	(Belgium) Nic Jansen	Saroléa			5		4							5
13	(Sweden) Rolf Tibblin	Husqvarna		5							5			4
13	(United Kingdom) John Draper	BSA							5	5				4
15	(Denmark) Boris Rasbro	BSA			4									3
16	(Sweden) Ove Lundell	Monark					5							2
16	(Belgium) Jaw Rombauts	BSA	5											2
16	(Sweden) Raymond Sigvardsson	Matchless											5	2
19	(Sweden) Gunnar Johansson	Crescent-AJS 7R	6											1
19	(Denmark) Ejvind Hansen	BSA			6									1
19	(France) Jean Hazianis	BSA				6								1

=== 250cc ===
Pos	Rider	Machine	AUT (Austria)	CH (Switzerland)	BEL (Belgium)	GDR (East Germany)	CSK (Czechoslovakia)	POL (Poland)	RFA (West Germany)	ITA (Italy)	FRA (France)	NED (Netherlands)	UK (United Kingdom)	LUX (Luxembourg)	SWE (Sweden)	Pts
1	(Sweden) Rolf Tibblin	Husqvarna					4		1		1	1	1	1	1	51
2	(United Kingdom) Brian Stonebridge	Greeves		1	1				4	1	2		6	2		40
3	(Czech Republic) Jaromír Čížek	Jawa	3			1	1	1		2						34
4	(Czech Republic) Jaroslav Kmoch	Jawa	2	2		4	5	3	3	3						29
5	(Sweden) Stig Rickardsson	Husqvarna				2		4	2		5	2				23
6	(Czech Republic) Frantisek Ron	Jawa	6	5			6	2	5	4	3		3			22
7	(Sweden) Lennart Dahlén	Husqvarna	5	3	3	5				6	4	3			4	22
8	(Czech Republic) Miloslav Soucek	ESO	1			3			6							13
9	(Sweden) Torsten Hallman	Husqvarna										4			2	9
10	(United Kingdom) Dave Bickers	Greeves											4	3	5	9
11	(West Germany) Willy Oesterle	Maico					2				6			6		8
11	(West Germany) Fritz Betzelbacher	Maico			6	6	3							5		8
13	(United Kingdom) Jeff Smith	BSA											2			6
13	(Belgium) Fernand Neri	Aermacchi			2											6
15	(Belgium) Jean Crosset	Jawa			5									4		5
16	(Sweden) Per Olaf Persson	Husqvarna													3	4
17	(West Germany) Rolf Müller	Maico		4												3
18	(Italy) Emilio Ostorero	Mival		6						5						3
18	(Germany) Otto Walz	Maico	4													3
18	(Germany) Klaus Kamper	Maico			4											3
21	(Poland) Eungenius Frelich	Jawa						5								2
21	(Sweden) Sivert Eriksson	Husqvarna										5				2
21	(United Kingdom) John Draper	BSA											5			2
24	(Poland) Eungenius Krokowski	Jawa						6								1
24	(Netherlands) Rudi Boom	Greeves										6				1
24	(Sweden) Ove Lundell	Husqvarna													6	1
