= 1958 Motocross World Championship =

Motocross championship season

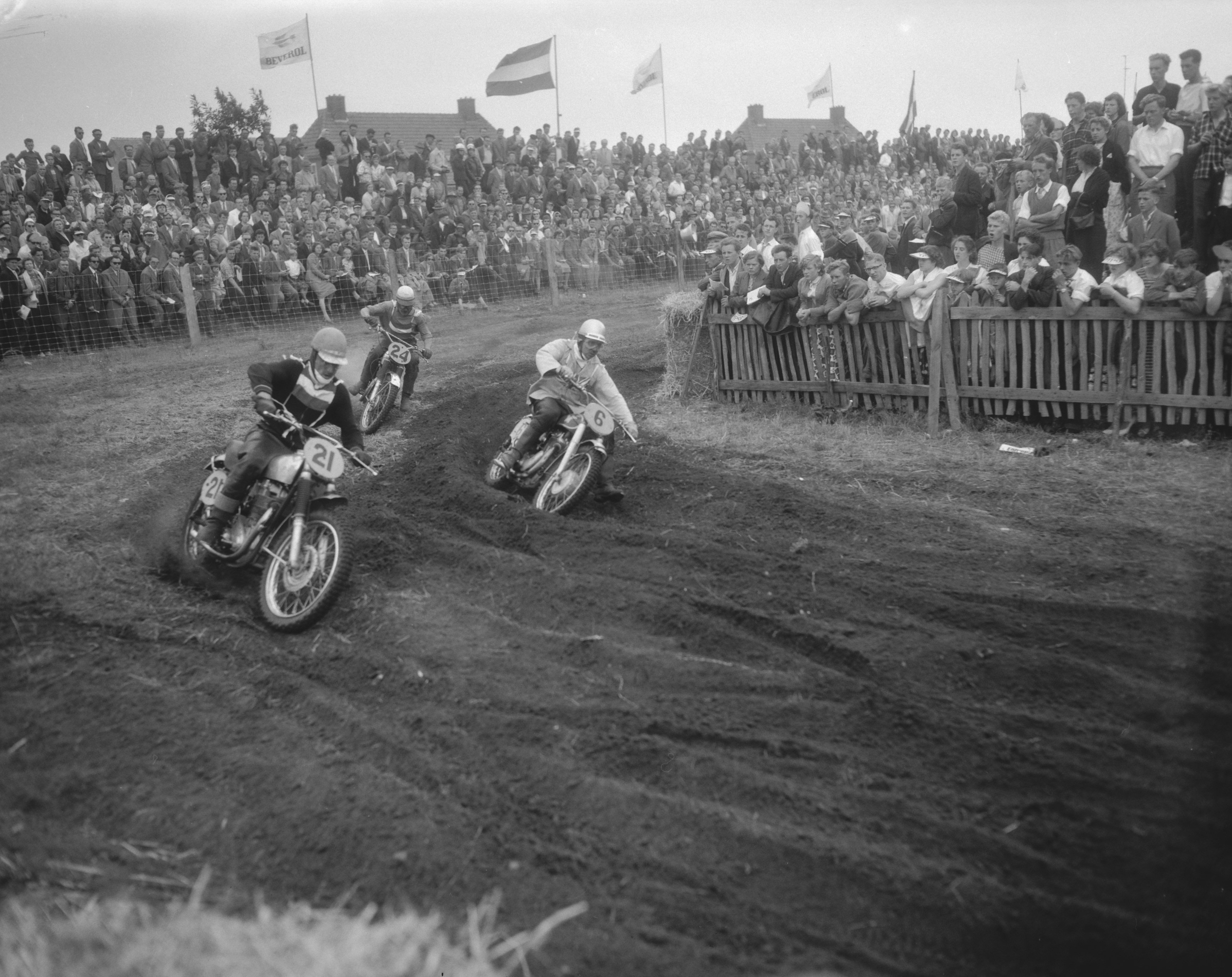
- Action from the 1958 500cc Dutch Grand Prix, held in Sint Anthonis on 27 July 1958.
- Organizer: FIM
- Duration: 20 May/18 August
- Number of races: 10
- Number of manufacturers: 8

Champions
- 500cc: (Belgium) René Baeten
- 250cc (Note: In this season still called the European Cup.): (Czech Republic) Jaromír Čížek

Motocross World Championship
- ← 1957 1959 →

The 1958 Motocross World Championship was the 2nd edition of the Motocross World Championship organized by the FIM and reserved for 500cc motorcycles. In a sign of the sport's growing popularity, the first Motocross World Championship race behind the Iron Curtain is hosted by Czechoslovakia on 8 June.

== Summary ==
After five editions of the European Championship, from 1952 to 1956, the championship from 1957 took the name of the World Championship, at least for the 500cc class. The 250cc class, introduced this season, will also dispute five running-in seasons, from 1957 to 1961, a period in which it will take on the name of the European Cup, to become World Championship as well starting from the 1962 season.

From April to August the 500cc class held 9 grands prix which awarded points to the first six classified competitors, respectively: 8, 6, 4, 3, 2, 1. The score in the final classification of each competitor was calculated on the best four results.

== Grands Prix ==
=== 500cc ===
Round	Date	Grand Prix	Location	Winner	Team	Report
1	April 20	(Austria) Austrian Grand Prix	Sittendorf	(Belgium) Hubert Scaillet	FN	Report
2	May 4	(Denmark) Danish Grand Prix	Næstved	(Sweden) Bill Nilsson	Crescent-AJS	Report
3	May 11	(Switzerland) Swiss Grand Prix	Geneva	(Belgium) René Baeten	FN	Report
4	May 18	(France) French Grand Prix	Cassel	(United Kingdom) John Draper	BSA	Report
5	June 22	(Italy) Italian Grand Prix	Imola	(Sweden) Sten Lundin	Monark	Report
6	July 6	(United Kingdom) British Grand Prix	Hawkstone Park	(Sweden) Lars Gustavsson	Monark	Report
7	July 27	(Netherlands) Dutch Grand Prix	Sint Anthonis	(United Kingdom) John Draper	BSA	Report
8	August 3	(Belgium) Belgian Grand Prix	Namur	(Belgium) René Baeten	FN	Report
9	August 10	Luxembourg Grand Prix	Ettelbruck	(Belgium) René Baeten	FN	Report
10	August 17	(Sweden) Swedish Grand Prix	Uddevalla	(Sweden) Sten Lundin	Monark	Report

=== 250cc ===
Round	Date	Grand Prix	Location	Winner	Team	Report
1	April 20	(Austria) Austrian Grand Prix	Sittendorf	(Germany) Rolf Müller	Maico	Report
2	May 11	(Switzerland) Swiss Grand Prix	Geneva	(Czech Republic) Jaromír Čížek	Jawa	Report
3	May 18	(France) French Grand Prix	Cassel	(Czech Republic) Jaromír Čížek	Jawa	Report
4	June 8	(Czech Republic) Czechoslovak Grand Prix	Divoká Šárka	(Czech Republic) Jaromír Čížek	Jawa	Report
5	June 14	(United Kingdom) British Grand Prix	Beenhan Park	(Czech Republic) Jaromír Čížek	Jawa	Report
6	July 13	(Germany) German Grand Prix	Bielstein	(Sweden) Rolf Tibblin	Husqvarna	Report
7	July 20	(Italy) Italian Grand Prix	Avigliana	(Germany) Fritz Betzelbacher	Maico	Report
8	July 27	(Netherlands) Dutch Grand Prix	Sint Anthonis	(Czech Republic) Jaromír Čížek	Jawa	Report
9	August 8	(Belgium) Belgian Grand Prix	Namur	(Czech Republic) Jaromír Čížek	Jawa	Report
10	August 11	Luxembourg Grand Prix	Ettelbruck	(Germany) Fritz Betzelbacher	Maico	Report
11	August 17	(Sweden) Swedish Grand Prix	Uddevalla	(Sweden) Lennart Dahlen	Husqvarna	Report
12	August 31	(Poland) Polish Grand Prix	Katowice-Zabrze	(Poland) Roman Zurawiecki	Maico	Report

== Final standings ==
=== 500cc ===
Points are awarded to the top 6 classified finishers.

Position	1st	2nd	3rd	4th	5th	6th
Points	8	6	4	3	2	1

Pos	Rider	Machine	AUT (Austria)	DEN (Denmark)	CH (Switzerland)	FRA (France)	ITA (Italy)	UK (United Kingdom)	NED (Netherlands)	BEL (Belgium)	LUX (Luxembourg)	SWE (Sweden)	Pts
1	(Belgium) René Baeten	FN		2	1	2		2	3	1	1		42
2	(Sweden) Bill Nilsson	Crescent-AJS	2	1	2	5	3			3	2		34
3	(Sweden) Sten Lundin	Monark		3	2	5	1		4	2	3	1	33
4	(United Kingdom) John Draper	BSA			4	1	6		1	4	6		24
5	(Belgium) Hubert Scaillet	FN	1	6	3		2						19
6	(United Kingdom) Jeff Smith	BSA		4		3	4		5	5	4	4	18
7	(Sweden) Lars Gustavsson	Monark						1				5	10
8	(Netherlands) Albert Dirkx	BSA	6		6				2				8
9	(Sweden) Gunnar Johansson	BSA		5			5					3	8
10	(Sweden) Raymond Sigvardsson	AJS										2	6
11	(United Kingdom) Brian Martin	BSA	5					4					5
12	(United Kingdom) Don Rickman	BSA						3					4
12	(United Kingdom) Peter Taft	BSA	3										4
14	(United Kingdom) Les Archer Jr.	Norton				4							3
14	(France) Paul Godey	BSA	4										3
16	(Denmark) Mogens Rasmussen	Matchless					5						2
16	(France) René Klym	BSA			5								2
16	(Belgium) Herman De Soete	Matchless									5		2
19	(United Kingdom) David Curtis	Matchless				6				6			2
20	(Sweden) Rolf Loof	Matchless										6	1
20	(Belgium) Raymond Van Obergen	AJS							6				1
20	(Netherlands) Joep Jansen	BSA						6					1

=== 250cc ===
Pos	Rider	Machine	AUT (Austria)	CH (Switzerland)	FRA (France)	CZE (Czech Republic)	UK (United Kingdom)	GER (West Germany)	ITA (Italy)	NED (Netherlands)	BEL (Belgium)	LUX (Luxembourg)	SWE (Sweden)	POL (Poland)	Pts
1	(Czech Republic) Jaromír Čížek	Jawa	2	1	1	1	1			1	1	1		5	56
2	(Sweden) Rolf Tibblin	Husqvarna						1	3	2	2	4			27
3	(West Germany) Rolf Müller	Maico	1			2		3				5	2		26
4	(West Germany) Klaus Kaemper	Maico			2			2		3		3			20
5	(Czech Republic) Frantisek Ron	Jawa	3	3	4		5			6	4			4	20
6	(Sweden) Lennart Dahlen	Husqvarna				5							1	2	16
7	(Sweden) Stieg Rickardsson	Husqvarna									3	2		3	14
8	(West Germany) Fritz Betzelbacher	Maico				3			1			6			13
9	(Poland) Roman Zurawiecki	Maico												1	8
10	(Italy) Antonio Moretti	Mi-Val		6					2						7
11	(Czech Republic) Oldrich Hamrsmid	Jawa	4		3										7
12	(Italy) Emilio Ostorero	Mi-Val		2											6
12	(United Kingdom) Brian Stonebridge	Greeves					2								6
14	(Netherlands) Simon Schram	Maico	6		6	6				4					6
15	(United Kingdom) Triss Sharp	Francis-Barnett					3								4
15	(Sweden) Ove Lundell	Monark											3		4
15	(Italy) Carlo Caroli	Bianchi		4					6						4
15	(Belgium) Joseph Van Pee	Jawa			5						5				4
19	(Czech Republic) Josef Chara	Jawa				4									3
18	(United Kingdom) Bryan Leask	Greeves					4								3
18	(Germany) Herbert Ott	DKW						4							3
18	(Italy) Vincenzo Soletti	Bianchi							4						3
18	(Sweden) Ted Lindskog	Husqvarna											4		3
18	(Czech Republic) Aloys Roucka	Jawa		5											2
25	(Czech Republic) Bohumil Roucka	ČZ	5												2
25	(Germany) Otto Walz	Maico						5							2
25	(Italy) Cesare Bricarelli	Mi-Val							5						2
25	(Netherlands) Jan Van der Mel	Adler								5					2
25	(Sweden) Rolf Jonsson	Husqvarna											5		2
30	(United Kingdom) Roy King	Greeves					6								1
30	(Germany) Willi Oesterle	Maico						6							1
30	(Belgium) Fernand Houssonloge	Maico									6				1
30	(Austria) Herbert Hubert	Maico												6	1
30	(Sweden) Sivert Eriksson	Crescent											6		1
