= 1960 Motocross World Championship =

Motocross championship season

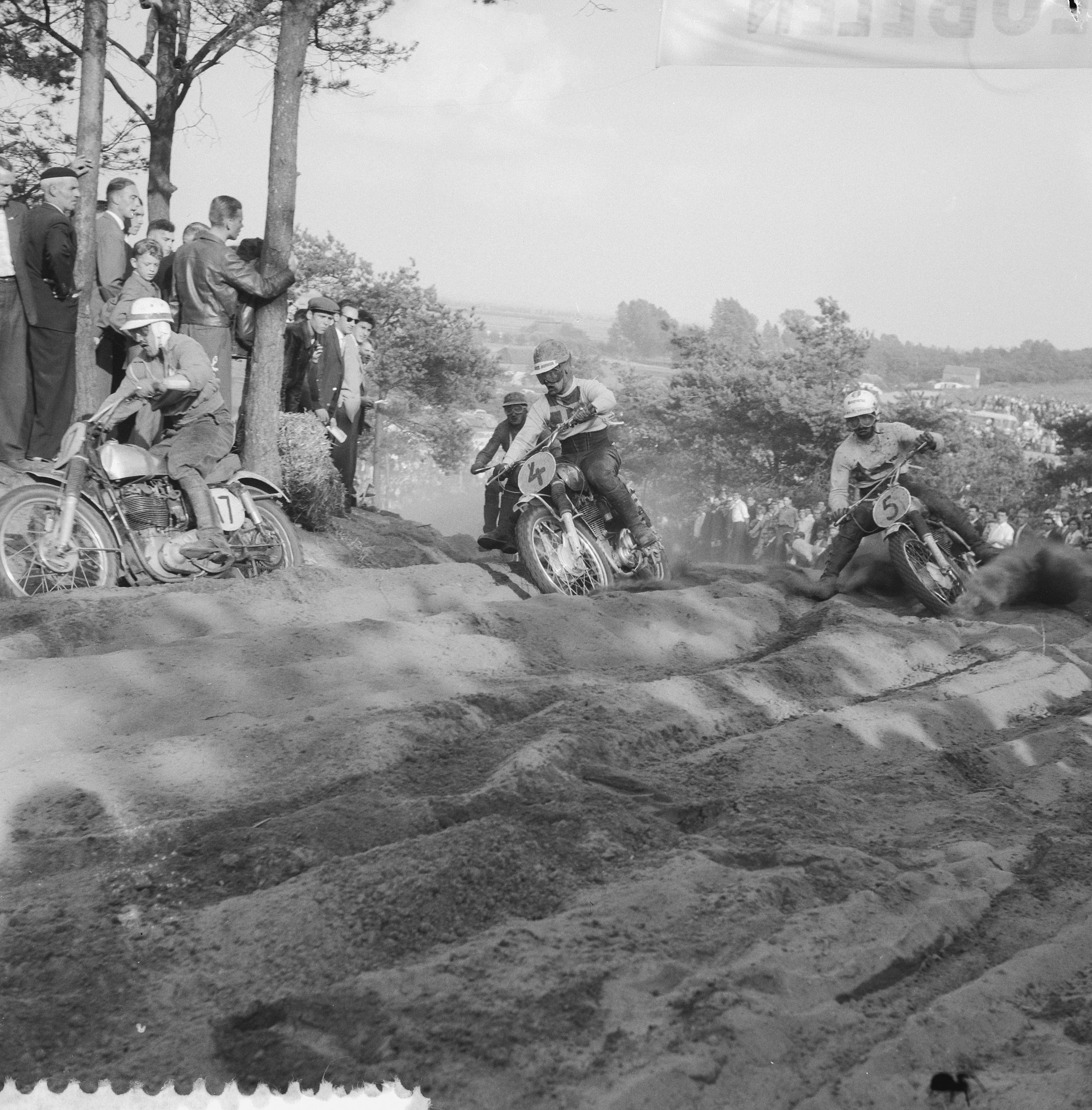
- Action from the 500cc Dutch Grand Prix race on 24 July 1960 in Bergharen, Netherlands
- Organizer: FIM
- Duration: 23 April/14 August
- Number of races: 9
- Number of manufacturers: 15

Champions
- 500cc: (Sweden) Bill Nilsson
- 250cc (Note: Now called the European Championship.): (United Kingdom) Dave Bickers

Motocross World Championship
- ← 1959 1961 →

The 1960 Motocross World Championship was the 4th edition of the Motocross World Championship organized by the FIM and reserved for 500cc and 250cc motorcycles.

The FIM implemented new rules dividing the races into two 45 minute heat races that were referred to as motos. In the event of a tie for example: 1-2 and 2-1, the total time of the two rounds is the decisive factor to determine the winner. However, the FIM allowed certain freedoms to Grand Prix race organizers who can maintain the old method of qualifying heat races for a single final round depending on the number of competitors participating in the Grand Prix. Two Grand Prix races, the Belgian and Luxembourg Grand Prix races are held as a single round.

== Summary ==
Team Husqvarna's Rolf Tibblin had an early lead in the championship by winning the first two Grand Prix races of the year; however, the battle for the title came down to fellow Swedes Bill Nilsson (Husqvarna) and Sten Lundin (Monark). Nilsson prevailed by a narrow 2-point margin to claim the second 500cc world championship of his career. Dave Bickers, riding for the Greeves factory racing team, claimed the 250cc European Motocross Championship over his countryman, Jeff Smith.

1958 500cc World Champion René Baeten was killed in a racing accident during an international non-championship race in Stekene, Belgium, on 5 June 1960.

== Grands Prix ==
=== 500cc ===
Round	Date	Grand Prix	Location	Race 1 Winner	Race 2 Winner	Overall Winner	Report
1	April 24	(Austria) Austrian Grand Prix	Sittendorf	(Sweden) Rolf Tibblin	(Sweden) Rolf Tibblin	(Sweden) Rolf Tibblin	Report
2	May 15	(France) French Grand Prix	Vesoul	(Sweden) Rolf Tibblin	(Sweden) Sten Lundin	(Sweden) Rolf Tibblin	Report
3	May 22	(Sweden) Swedish Grand Prix	Knutstorp	(Sweden) Sten Lundin	(Sweden) Bill Nilsson	(Sweden) Bill Nilsson	Report
4	June 12	(Italy) Italian Grand Prix	Imola	(Sweden) Sten Lundin	(Sweden) Bill Nilsson	(Sweden) Sten Lundin	Report
5	June 26	(Germany) West German Grand Prix	Bielstein	(United Kingdom) Don Rickman	(Sweden) Sten Lundin	(Sweden) Sten Lundin	Report
6	July 3	(United Kingdom) British Grand Prix	Shrewsbury	(Sweden) Bill Nilsson	(Sweden) Bill Nilsson	(Sweden) Bill Nilsson	Report
7	July 24	(Netherlands) Dutch Grand Prix	Bergharen	(Sweden) Bill Nilsson	(Sweden) Rolf Tibblin	(Sweden) Bill Nilsson	Report
8	August 7	(Belgium) Belgian Grand Prix*	Namur	-	-	(Sweden) Bill Nilsson	Report
9	August 14	Luxembourg Grand Prix*	Ettelbruck	-	-	(Sweden) Sten Lundin	Report
*Organizers of the Belgian and Dutch Grands Prix hold qualifying heat races for a single final round. Sources:

=== 250cc ===
Round	Date	Grand Prix	Location	Race 1 Winner	Race 2 Winner	Overall Winner	Report
1	April 3	(Switzerland) Swiss Grand Prix	Payerne	(Sweden) Torsten Hallman	(Sweden) Stig Rickardsson	(United Kingdom) Dave Bickers	Report
2	April 24	(Belgium) Belgian Grand Prix	Dison	(United Kingdom) Arthur Lampkin	(United Kingdom) Dave Bickers	(Czechoslovakia) Jaromír Čížek	Report
3	May 1	(France) French Grand Prix	Pernes-les-Fontaines	(Sweden) Stig Rickardsson	(United Kingdom) Dave Bickers	(Sweden) Stig Rickardsson	Report
4	May 22	(Czechoslovakia) Czechoslovak Grand Prix	Divoká Šárka	(Czechoslovakia) Miloslav Souček	(United Kingdom) Jeff Smith	(Czechoslovakia) Miloslav Souček	Report
5	May 29	(Poland) Polish Grand Prix	Katowice-Zabrze	(United Kingdom) Dave Bickers	(United Kingdom) Dave Bickers	(United Kingdom) Dave Bickers	Report
6	June 5	(Italy) Italian Grand Prix	Avigliana	(Italy) Emilio Ostorero	(Italy) Emilio Ostorero	(Italy) Emilio Ostorero	Report
7	June 12	(East Germany) East German Grand Prix	Eisenach	(Sweden) Lennart Dahlen	(Sweden) Torsten Hallman	(Sweden) Stig Rickardsson	Report
8	June 19	(Finland) Finnish Grand Prix	Helsinki	(United Kingdom) Arthur Lampkin	(United Kingdom) Arthur Lampkin	(United Kingdom) Arthur Lampkin	Report
9	June 26	Luxembourg Grand Prix	Schifflange	(United Kingdom) Jeff Smith	(United Kingdom) Dave Bickers	(United Kingdom) Jeff Smith	Report
10	July 17	(United Kingdom) British Grand Prix	Shrubland Park	(United Kingdom) Jeff Smith	(United Kingdom) Dave Bickers	(United Kingdom) Jeff Smith	Report
11	August 7	(Sweden) Swedish Grand Prix	Vannas	(United Kingdom) Dave Bickers	(Sweden) Stig Rickardsson	(United Kingdom) Dave Bickers	Report
12	September 4	(West Germany) West German Grand Prix	Leichlingen	(United Kingdom) Dave Bickers	(Sweden) Lennart Dahlen	(United Kingdom) Dave Bickers	Report

== Final standings ==
Points are awarded to the top 6 classified finishers. For the final championship standings, half of the competitors' results + 1 are retained. Thus with 9 500cc Grands Prix, the 5 best results are retained. With 12 250cc Grands Prix, the 7 best results are retained.

Position	1st	2nd	3rd	4th	5th	6th
Points	8	6	4	3	2	1

=== 500cc ===
(Results in italics indicate overall winner)

Pos	Rider	Machine	AUT (Austria)		FRA (France)		SWE (Sweden)		ITA (Italy)		GER (West Germany)		UK (United Kingdom)		NED (Netherlands)		BEL (Belgium)	LUX (Luxembourg)	Pts
Pos	Rider	Machine	R1	R2	R1	R2	R1	R2	R1	R2	R1	R2	R1	R2	R1	R2	R1*	R1*	Pts
1	(Sweden) Bill Nilsson	Husqvarna	3	2	-	-	3	1	5	1	-	-	1	1	1	2	1	13	38
2	(Sweden) Sten Lundin	Monark	2	-	3	1	1	3	1	2	2	1	5	-	-	-	2	1	36
3	(Sweden) Rolf Tibblin	Husqvarna	1	1	1	2	-	-	22	-	-	-	6	6	3	1	4	8	26
4	(United Kingdom) Don Rickman	Triumph-Métisse	-	-	2	-	-	7	2	3	1	2	2	3	7	8	5	2	26
5	(Sweden) Gunnar Johansson	Lito	-	-	-	-	2	2	4	4	3	3	4	4	4	7	3	9	21
6	(Sweden) Ove Lundell	Monark	-	-	9	3	4	4	6	7	-	4	-	-	22	5	-	3	10
7	(Belgium) René Baeten	Matchless	6	3	8	4	6	6	-	-	-	-	-	-	-	-	-	-	8
8	(Sweden) Lars Gustavsson	Monark	-	-	-	-	-	-	8	-	-	-	-	-	5	3	-	4	7
9	(United Kingdom) Les Archer Jr.	Norton	4	6	-	-	-	-	3	5	-	-	-	-	6	6	-	7	7
10	(United Kingdom) John Burton	BSA	5	4	-	-	5	5	-	-	-	-	-	-	-	-	-	-	5
11	(Netherlands) Broer Dirkx	BSA	-	-	5	5	14	8	19	-	-	-	-	5	2	-	-	-	4
12	(Belgium) Hubert Scaillet	Matchless	-	-	7	-	-	-	7	6	5	5	-	-	-	-	-	-	4
13	(United Kingdom) Arthur Lampkin	BSA	-	-	-	-	-	-	-	-	-	-	3	7	-	-	-	-	3
14	(United Kingdom) John Draper	BSA	-	5	-	-	8	-	-	-	-	-	-	-	-	-	7	5	3
15	(United Kingdom) Derek Rickman	Triumph-Métisse	-	-	-	-	-	-	21	-	4	-	-	-	-	-	-	-	2
15	(United Kingdom) Jeff Smith	BSA	-	-	-	-	-	-	-	-	-	-	8	2	-	-	-	-	2
17	(Belgium) Nic Jansen	Matchless	-	-	6	6	-	-	11	-	-	-	-	-	-	-	6	-	2
18	(Belgium) Herman De Soete	Matchless	-	-	11	-	-	-	10	8	-	-	-	-	-	-	-	6	1
-	(France) Guy Bertrand	BSA	-	-	4	-	-	-	-	-	-	-	-	-	-	-	-	-	0
-	(Belgium) Albert Dirkx	BSA	-	-	-	-	-	-	-	-	-	-	-	-	-	4	-	-	0
*Organizers of the Belgian and Luxembourg Grands Prix hold qualifying heat races for a single final round. Sources:

=== 250cc ===
(Results in italics indicate overall winner)

Pos	Rider	Machine	CH (Switzerland)		BEL (Belgium)		FRA (France)		TCH (Czechoslovakia)		POL (Poland)		ITA (Italy)		GDR (East Germany)		FIN (Finland)		LUX (Luxembourg)		UK (United Kingdom)		SWE (Sweden)		GER (Germany)		Pts
Pos	Rider	Machine	R1	R2	R1	R2	R1	R2	R1	R2	R1	R2	R1	R2	R1	R2	R1	R2	R1	R2	R1	R2	R1	R2	R1	R2	Pts
1	(United Kingdom) Dave Bickers	Greeves	2	3	5	1	3	1	4	4	1	1	-	-	5	6	3	8	2	1	-	1	1	2	1	2	48
2	(United Kingdom) Jeff Smith	BSA	-	-	4	3	-	-	5	1	2	-	2	6	4	-	-	-	1	2	1	2	2	3	-	-	35
3	(Czechoslovakia) Miloslav Souček	ESO	4	-	3	6	14	11	1	2	3	3	-	-	-	5	5	4	-	-	5	-	-	-	2	3	26
4	(Sweden) Stig Rickardsson	Husqvarna	-	1	11	-	1	2	-	-	-	-	5	4	2	2	-	-	-	-	2	9	6	1	9	-	25
5	(United Kingdom) Arthur Lampkin	BSA	7	2	1	4	-	-	-	-	-	2	11	-	6	3	1	1	19	-	3	-	3	6	3	6	25
6	(Sweden) Lennart Dahlén	Husqvarna	11	4	6	7	7	5	6	3	-	-	-	5	1	4	2	3	4	4	4	-	4	4	6	1	25
7	(Sweden) Torsten Hallman	Husqvarna	1	-	10	-	2	4	-	-	-	-	3	2	3	1	4	2	3	3	-	-	-	-	-	-	24
8	(Czechoslovakia) Jaromír Čížek	Jawa	3	5	2	2	12	-	2	-	-	-	-	-	-	-	-	-	-	-	-	-	-	-	-	-	14
9	(Czechoslovakia) Vlastimil Válek	ČZ	-	-	-	-	-	-	3	-	5	4	-	-	-	-	8	5	5	-	7	4	5	5	-	-	11
10	(Italy) Emilio Ostorero	Bianchi	-	-	-	-	-	-	-	-	-	-	1	1	-	-	-	-	6	7	-	-	-	-	-	-	10
11	(Sweden) Sivert Eriksson	Husqvarna	-	-	18	9	6	16	-	-	-	-	-	-	-	-	-	-	-	-	6	3	-	-	-	-	6
12	(Italy) Lanfranco Angelini	Aermacchi	-	-	-	-	-	-	-	-	-	-	4	3	-	-	-	-	-	-	-	-	-	-	-	-	4
13	(Czechoslovakia) Arnošt Zemen	ČZ	-	-	8	8	8	10	-	6	4	-	-	-	-	-	-	-	-	-	-	-	-	-	-	-	3
14	(West Germany) Willy Oesterle	Maico	8	15	-	-	5	3	-	-	-	-	-	-	-	-	-	-	-	-	-	-	-	-	-	-	3
14	(West Germany) Fritz Betzelbacher	Maico	6	7	-	-	4	13	-	-	-	-	-	-	-	-	-	-	7	-	-	-	-	-	-	5	3
16	(West Germany) Christoph Specht	Maico	-	-	-	-	-	-	-	-	-	-	-	-	-	-	-	-	-	-	-	-	-	-	5	4	3
17	(United Kingdom) Bryan Sharp	Greeves	-	-	-	-	-	-	-	-	-	-	-	-	-	-	-	-	-	-	8	6	-	-	-	-	2
17	(Sweden) Rolf Stagman	Husqvarna	5	8	-	-	-	-	-	-	-	-	-	-	-	-	-	-	-	-	-	-	-	-	-	-	2
17	(Australia) Tim Gibbes	AJS	-	-	-	-	-	-	-	-	6	5	-	-	-	-	-	-	-	-	-	-	-	-	-	-	2
20	(Czechoslovakia) Ervín Krajčovič	Jawa	-	-	-	-	-	-	-	-	-	-	-	-	-	-	9	7	8	6	-	-	-	-	-	-	1
20	(Finland) Raimo Rein	Jawa	-	-	-	-	-	-	-	-	-	-	-	-	-	-	7	6	-	-	-	-	-	-	-	-	1
20	(Czechoslovakia) František Ron	Jawa	10	6	7	5	9	9	-	-	-	-	-	-	-	-	-	-	-	-	10	-	-	-	-	-	1
20	(Finland) Aarno Erola	Husqvarna	-	-	-	-	10	7	-	-	-	-	-	-	-	-	6	-	-	-	-	-	-	-	-	-	1
20	(Czechoslovakia) Josef Chára	Jawa	-	-	-	-	-	-	-	5	-	-	-	-	-	10	-	-	-	-	-	-	-	-	10	-	1
20	(West Germany) Otto Walz	Maico	9	-	-	-	16	6	-	-	-	-	6	-	-	-	-	-	-	-	-	-	-	-	-	-	1
20	(United Kingdom) John Draper	BSA	-	-	-	-	-	-	-	-	-	-	-	-	-	-	-	-	-	-	-	-	-	-	4	-	1
-	(Belgium) Jean Crosset	Jawa	13	9	9	-	-	-	-	-	-	-	-	-	-	-	-	-	-	5	-	-	-	-	-	-	0
-	(United Kingdom) Triss Sharp	Greeves	-	-	-	-	-	-	-	-	-	-	-	-	-	-	-	-	-	-	-	5	-	-	-	-	0
