= Jaromír Čížek =

Czech motorcycle racer (1927–2003)

- Nationality: Czech
- Born: 13 March 1927 Prague, Czechoslovakia
- Died: 20 September 2003 (aged 76) Prague, Czech Republic

Motocross career
- Years active: 1952–1966
- Teams: Jawa
- Championships: 250cc European Cup - 1958
- Wins: 13

Jaromír Čížek (13 March 1927 – 20 September 2003) was a Czech motocross and enduro racer. He competed in the FIM European Motocross Championships between 1957 and 1962, most prominently as a member of the Jawa factory racing team where he won the 1958 250cc European Motocross Championship.

== Motorcycle racing career ==
Čížek began riding motorcycles at the age of 13 during World War II and developed a passion for racing motorcycles. After the war, he built a homemade motorcycle with a friend and by 1947, he was winning local races. After completing his military service, he worked as a mechanic in Prague where he built his first off-road motorcycle from a 250cc Jawa Perak. His racing success earned him a place on the Jawa factory racing team in 1952.

Čížek initially focused on enduro competitions, but he also participating in endurance racing such as the Bol d'Or 24-hour race and in a 24-hour race held in the Ardennes. He won the first of four consecutive 250cc Czech Motocross Championships in 1954. In 1955 he participated in the International Six Days Enduro held in Gottwaldov, Czechoslovakia (now called Zlín).

Čížek did not make his international debut until the age of 30 when the Jawa factory team entered him into the 1957 250cc European Motocross Championship. He made an immediate impact in his first international outing by winning the season-opening 250cc Swiss Grand Prix and ended the season ranked third behind Fritz Betzelbacher (Maico) and Willi Oesterle (Maico).

Čížek had the best season of his career in the 1958 when he and the Jawa team dominated the 250cc European Motocross Championship. He won six of the twelve Grand Prix races to win the championship by a comfortable margin over second-placed Rolf Tibblin (Husqvarna). In 1959, Čížek won three consecutive races, but failed to score consistently and ended the season ranked third behind Tibblin and Brian Stonebridge (Greeves).

Čížek won the 1960 250cc Belgian Grand Prix but then was seriously injured at the Finnish Grand Prix and was forced to withdraw from the championship to recover. Čížek returned in the 1961 250cc championship to place fifth in the final standings and scored the thirteenth and final Grand Prix victory of his career at the 250cc East German Grand Prix. 1961 would be his last full season of competition. The FIM upgraded the European Motocross Championship to World Championship status for the 1962 season. He placed third at the 1962 250cc Czech Grand Prix and, competed in his final World Championship race at the 1962 250cc East German Grand Prix at the age of 36.

== Career overview ==
Čížek won nine Grand Prix heat races and 13 Grand Prix during his career in the Motocross World Championships. He was an eight-time Czech motocross national champion (250cc: 1954-1957, 1959 / 500cc: 1957). Along with Vlastimil Válek, he was one of the most accomplished Czech motocross racers of the 1950s and early 1960s.

== Later life ==
After his motocross racing career, Čížek became one of the pioneers of autocross racing in Czechoslovakia.

== Motocross Grand Prix results ==
Points system from 1952 to 1968:

Position	1st	2nd	3rd	4th	5th	6th
Points	8	6	4	3	2	1

Denotes European motocross championship only.

Year	Class	Machine	1		2		3		4		5		6		7		8		9		10		11		12		13		14		15		Pos	Pts
Year	Class	Machine	R1	R2	R1	R2	R1	R2	R1	R2	R1	R2	R1	R2	R1	R2	R1	R2	R1	R2	R1	R2	R1	R2	R1	R2	R1	R2	R1	R2	R1	R2	Pos	Pts
1957	250cc	Jawa	CH; 1	CH; 1	FRA -	FRA -	GER -	GER; 2	GER -	GER -	BEL -	BEL; 4	LUX -	LUX; 3	BEL -	BEL; 3	AUT -	AUT -															3rd	25
1958	250cc	Jawa	AUT -	AUT; 2	CH; 1	CH; 1-	FRA; 1	FRA; 1	CZE -	CZE; 1	UK; 2	UK; 1	GER; 3	GER; 7	ITA -	ITA -	NED; 2	NED; 1	BEL -	BEL; 1	LUX -	LUX; 1	SWE -	SWE -	POL -	POL; 5							1st	56
1959	250cc	Jawa	AUT; 7	AUT; 1	CH; 3	CH; 19	BEL -	BEL -	GDR -	GDR; 1	CZE; 2	CZE; 2	POL; 2	POL; 1	GER; 8	GER; 10	ITA; 2	ITA; 2	FRA; 19	FRA; 5	NED -	NED -	UK -	UK -	LUX -	LUX; 9	SWE -	SWE -					3rd	34
1960	250cc	Jawa	CH; 3	CH; 5	BEL; 2	BEL; 2	FRA -	FRA -	CZE; 2	CZE -	POL -	POL -	ITA -	ITA; 8	GDR -	GDR -	FIN -	FIN -	LUX -	LUX -	UK -	UK -	SWE -	SWE -	GER -	GER -							8th	14
1961	250cc	Jawa	BEL; 4	BEL; 5	FRA; 6	FRA; 15	NED -	NED -	CZE; 2	CZE; 5	POL -	POL -	LUX; 8	LUX; 5	FIN -	FIN -	ITA -	ITA -	GER -	GER -	UK; 6	UK; 6	CH -	CH -	SWE -	SWE; 5	GDR; 1	GDR; 1					5th	19
1962	250cc	Jawa	ESP -	ESP -	CH -	CH -	BEL -	BEL -	FRA -	FRA -	CZE; 4	CZE; 3	POL; 3	POL -	NED -	NED -	LUX; 3	LUX -	FIN -	FIN -	USR -	USR -	GER -	GER -	ITA -	ITA -	UK -	UK -	SWE -	SWE -	GDR; 7	GDR; 7	11th	7
