= Vlastimil Válek (motorcyclist) =

Czech motocross racer (1951–2022)

- Nationality: Czech
- Born: 15 March 1938 Rokycany, Czechoslovakia
- Died: 31 May 1989 (aged 51) Lochkov, Czech Republic

Motocross career
- Years active: 1960–1972
- Teams: CZ, Jawa
- Championships: 750cc European Cup- 1969
- Wins: 6

Vlastimil Válek (15 March 1938 – 31 May 1989) was a Czech motocross and enduro racer. He competed in the FIM Motocross World Championships between 1960 and 1972, most prominently as a member of the ČZ factory racing team where in 1963 he became the first competitor to win a 500cc Motocross Grand Prix riding a motorcycle powered by a two-stroke engine. The victory was a turning point in motocross history as it marked the beginning of an era dominated by two-stroke machinery. Válek played an outsized role with the ČZ team, both as a motocross racer and as a development rider. His ability to provide feedback to engineers was instrumental in making ČZ the dominant manufacturer of motocross machinery in the late 1960s.

== Life and career ==
=== Early life ===
Válek was born in Rokycany, Czechoslovakia on 15 March 1938. He developed a passion for riding motorcycles from an early age and began to enter regional competitions. Válek performed his military service as a member of the motorsport section of the Border Guard where he was able to continue his motocross training. His first success came in 1959 when he won the Czech 500cc championship riding an ESO motorcycle.

=== European Motocross Championship ===
Válek's success got the attention of the ČZ factory racing team who then gave Válek a motorcycle to compete in the Czech round of the 1960 250cc European Motocross Championship held in the Divoká Šárka nature preserve near Prague. The European championship was considered to be the world championship at the time, as the sport of motocross had yet to develop outside of Europe. In the first heat race, he placed third ahead of Dave Bickers (Greeves) and Jeff Smith (BSA).

Válek's impressive performance secured him a place on the ČZ factory team for the remainder of the European Championship. At the following Grand Prix in Poland, Válek finished on the podium in third place behind Bickers and his ČZ teammate Miloslav Soucek. He scored another third place at the 250cc British Grand Prix behind Smith and Sivert Eriksson (Husqvarna) and finished the 1960 season ranked ninth in the final points standings.

With limited support from the ČZ factory for the 1961 250cc European Motocross Championship, Válek was forced to ride his old motorcycle which experienced several mechanical failures. Although he only scored points in 4 races, he managed to secure another third place in Poland and a second place in East Germany behind Jaromír Čížek (Jawa) to end the season ranked seventh. Válek was not only a competitive motocross racer, but he was also a talented mechanic capable of improving his motorcycle with modifications. He was known to use an oxyacetylene torch and welder to make modifications while at the racetrack, relying on gut instincts rather than any technical expertise.

During the 1950s, motocross competitors used motorcycles with heavy, pre-war, four-stroke engines, however by the mid 1960s, the heavier four-stroke motorcycles were being rendered obsolete by advances in two-stroke engine technology which made apparent the importance of lightness and agility in motocross racing. ČZ was one of the first motorcycle manufacturers to adopt two-stroke engine technology for motocross racing. Válek's ability to test modifications and provide accurate feedback to ČZ engineers helped develop and improve their motorcycles.

=== 250cc World Championships ===
The FIM upgraded the European Motocross Championship to World Championship status for the 1962 season. The ČZ factory developed a purpose-built motocross machine for the 1962 season, however it still experienced reliability issues, and Válek failed to score any points until the fourth round in France. The Swedish Husqvarna factory had also developed a new two-stroke motorcycle for their rider Torsten Hallman who took advantage of Válek's problems to take the championship points lead. Válek won the first Grand Prix of his Motocross World Championship career with a thrilling victory over Hallman at the 1962 Czech Grand Prix. The race wasn't decided until Hallman crashed while battling Válek for the race lead. Válek's victory also marked the first Grand Prix victory for the ČZ factory. Hallman won five of the last six Grand Prix races to clinch the World Championship, while Válek was able to score a second place and two third places to secure fourth place in the 250cc World Championship.

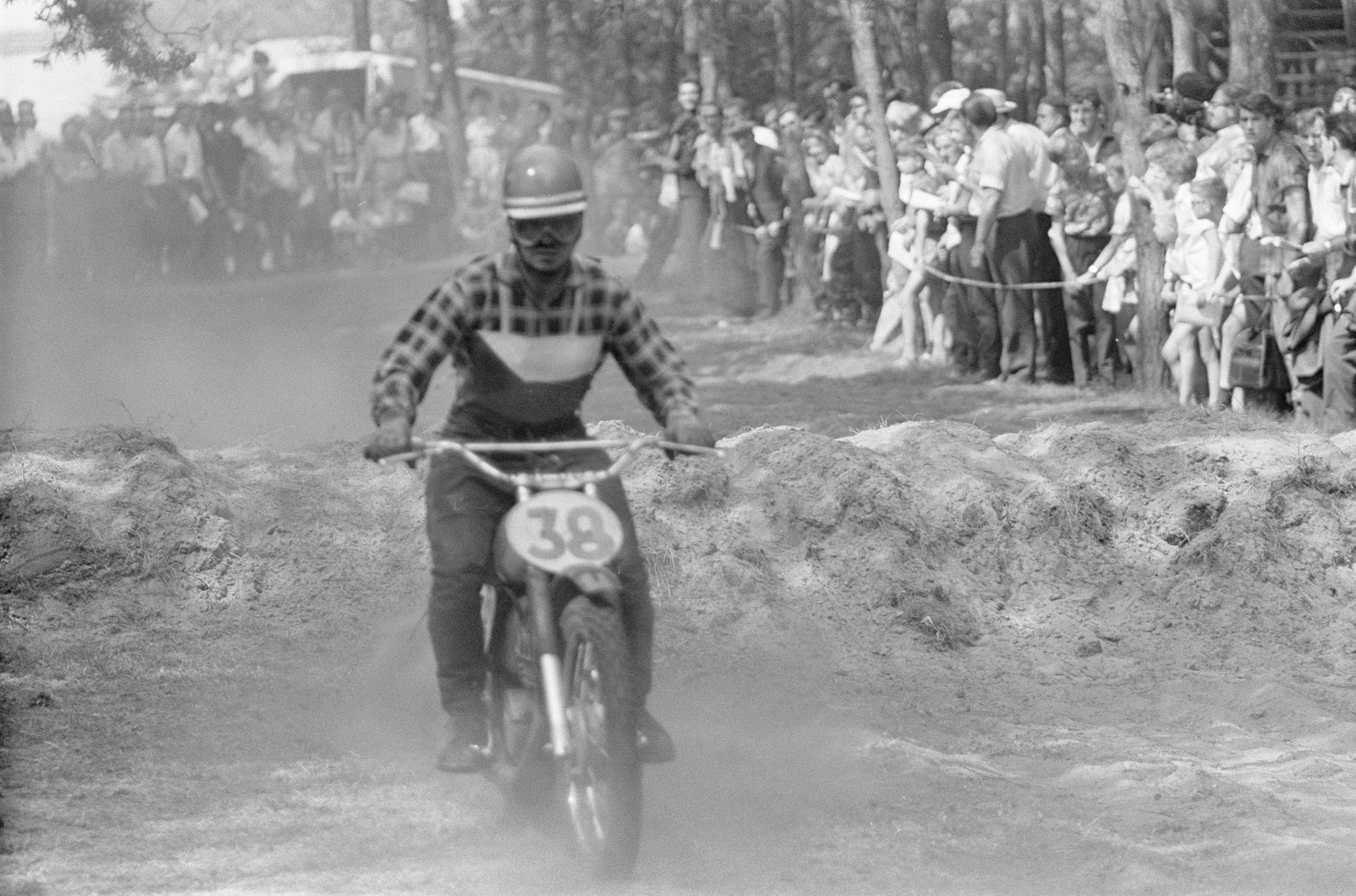
Válek (38) competing in the 1963 250cc Dutch Grand Prix at Bergharen.

Hallman and Husqvarna continued their domination during the 1963 250cc Motocross World Championship season by winning 8 of the 14 Grand Prix races. Válek would be Hallman's strongest opponent, taking second place in the championship despite missing the opening two rounds due to delays in preparing his motorcycle. The ČZ factory continued to refine and improve their motorcycles, with ČZ riders Igor Grigoriev, and Karel Pilař finishing in third and fourth behind Válek in the final points standings.

A significant moment in motocross history came during a break in the 250cc championship when the ČZ factory entered Válek into the Czech round of the 500cc Motocross World Championship at Divoká Šárka on 27 July 1963. Válek rode a 263cc two-stroke engine powered ČZ motorcycle to win the first moto of the 500cc Czechoslovak Motocross Grand Prix ahead of a field of top-class, four-stroke motorcycles. The victory marked a turning point in motocross history as, it was the first win by a two-stroke powered motorcycle in the premier division of the Motocross World Championships. By the end of the 1960s, four-stroke motocross motorcycles would become obsolete while ČZ became the dominant manufacturer of motocross machines.

At the 1963 Trophée des Nations event held in Loppem, Belgium, Válek was the second highest individual points scorer behind Torsten Hallman, helping the Czech team to a third place finish behind the Swedish and British teams. The 1963 season marked the highpoint of Válek's career.

In 1964, ČZ manufactured a production version of its 1963 factory team race bike, but a government decision transferred a group of ČZ employees including Válek to the Jawa motorcycle company to provide assistance in the development of new motorcycles. The Jawa motorcycle was fast but lacked reliability as Válek struggled to score points consistently with a third place at the season-ending 250cc French Grand Prix marking his best result of the year. He ended the season ranked seventh during which twenty-year-old newcomer Joël Robert won the 1964 250cc Motocross World Championship riding the ČZ motorcycle that Válek had played an integral role in developing. At the 1964 Trophée des Nations event held in Markelo, Netherlands, Válek was the fourth highest individual points scorer as the Czech team improved to a second place finish behind the Swedish team.

The results of Válek's development work at Jawa began to show in 1965 when he defeated Robert at the 250cc Czech Grand Prix, however he still struggled to score points consistently and ended the year ranked sixth in the final standings as Victor Arbekov won the World Championship for the ČZ factory. His triumph at the 1965 250cc Czech Grand Prix marked the final victory of his motocross racing career as well as the final Motocross World Championship victory for the Jawa factory.

=== 500cc World Championships ===
In 1966, Válek rejoined the ČZ team in the premier 500cc displacement division in an attempt to end the four-stroke domination of the class since the inception of the championship in 1957. Válek performed capably with two second places along with four third place finishes, however Paul Friedrichs won the World Championship for the ČZ factory to mark the first time that a two-stroke powered motorcycle had won the premier 500cc division. Válek's fourth place in the season final standings matched Miloslav Soucek's fourth place in 1961 as the best result by a Czech competitor in the 500cc Motocross World Championships.

Válek remained competitive in 1967 with three third place results and a second place in France, where he only lost to Friedrichs on aggregate time. However, Friedrichs easily defending his crown by winning seven out of eleven Grand Prix events. Válek also had to contend with Friedrich's ČZ teammate Bickers as well as Jeff Smith (BSA), and once again finished the season in fourth place. By 1968, the thirty-year-old Válek faced strong opposition from younger riders such as John Banks with the BSA team, Roger De Coster riding for the ČZ factory team and Åke Jonsson and Bengt Åberg riding for the Husqvarna team. He finished second to Friedrichs at the East German Grand Prix but failed to score points consistently and ended the season in 11th place overall as Friedrichs won his third consecutive 500cc World Championship.

=== Later career ===
Válek voluntarily resigned from his position with the Jawa team after the 1968 season but continued to compete sporadically at the World Championship level until 1972. In 1967 the FIM created an experimental class for machines of 501cc to 750cc engine displacement capacity in an effort to preserve the larger four-stroke engined motorcycles which were favored by some competitors and spectators. Válek rode a Jawa to win the 1969 FIM 750cc Motocross European Cup however, the race series was abandoned after the 1969 season due to the increasing popularity of the easier-to-ride lightweight two-stroke motorcycles.

Válek participated in the 1971 Inter-AMA motocross series in the United States, winning four out of six races on a ČZ to finish the series as the overall winner ahead of Bickers (ČZ) and Gunnar Lindström (Husqvarna). He also participated in the 1971 Trans-AMA motocross series where he finished in 13th place. The Trans-AMA was an international series for 500cc motorcycles established by the AMA as a pilot event to help establish motocross in the United States.

The ČZ factory's dominance of the Motocross World Championships ended with the arrival of the Japanese motorcycle manufacturers in the 1970s. As motocross technology began to progress rapidly, the ČZ and Jawa factories lacked the financial resources to maintain pace with the Japanese manufacturers and their motorcycles became less competitive. At the season-opening 1972 500cc Austrian Grand Prix, Válek scored an impressive third place behind Roger De Coster (Suzuki) and Willy Bauer (Maico) in the first heat race and finished the day fifth overall. He finished in the top ten a total of five times during the season and scored the final World Championship points of his career with an 8th place at the 1972 500cc West German Grand Prix. The 34-year-old Válek finished the 1972 season in 14th place riding an obsolete motorcycle with little support from the Jawa factory. He participated in his fourth and final Motocross des Nations held in Norg, Holland. It marked the final international motocross race of his career.

== Career overview ==
Válek won 13 Grand Prix heat races and six Grand Prix during his career in the Motocross World Championships. He was an eight-time Czech motocross national champion (500cc: 1959, 1966, 1967/ 250cc: 1961, 1963/ 175cc: 1960, 1963, 1964). He was also a member of four Czech teams at the Motocross des Nations (1969–1972) and four Trophée des Nations teams (1963-1966). Along with Jaromír Čížek, he was one of the most accomplished Czech motocross racers of the early 1960s. While he never won a Motocross World Championship, Válek helped ČZ become the dominant motocross manufacturer of the late 1960s.

== Later life ==
After his World Championship career, Válek traveled to Canada to help promote the sales of Czech motorcycles in Montreal. While in Canada, he was given the opportunity to compete and won the 1973 Canadian Open Class National Championship. After his racing career, Válek worked as a motocross riding coach and trainer for the Svazarm sports club.

Válek died on 31 May 1989 at the age of 51 when he suffered a heart attack while training on a motocross track near Prague.

== Motocross Grand Prix Results ==
Points system from 1952 to 1968:

Position	1st	2nd	3rd	4th	5th	6th
Points	8	6	4	3	2	1

Points system from 1969 to 1980:

Position	1	2	3	4	5	6	7	8	9	10
Points	15	12	10	8	6	5	4	3	2	1

Denotes European motocross championship only.

Year	Class	Team	1		2		3		4		5		6		7		8		9		10		11		12		13		14		15		Pos	Pts
Year	Class	Team	R1	R2	R1	R2	R1	R2	R1	R2	R1	R2	R1	R2	R1	R2	R1	R2	R1	R2	R1	R2	R1	R2	R1	R2	R1	R2	R1	R2	R1	R2	Pos	Pts
1960	250cc	ČZ	CH -	CH -	BEL -	BEL -	FRA -	FRA -	TCH; 3	TCH -	POL; 5	POL; 4	ITA -	ITA -	GDR -	GDR -	FIN; 8	FIN; 5	LUX; 5	LUX -	UK; 7	UK; 4	SWE; 5	SWE; 5	GER -	GER -							9th	11
1961	250cc	ČZ	BEL; 9	BEL; 7	FRA; 24	FRA -	NED -	NED -	TCH -	TCH; 7	POL; 5	POL; 3	LUX; 7	LUX; 7	FIN; 6	FIN; 5	ITA -	ITA -	GER -	GER -	UK -	UK -	CH -	CH -	SWE; 6	SWE; 7	GDR; 2	GDR; 2					7th	14
1962	250cc	ČZ	ESP -	ESP -	CH; 4	CH; 28	BEL -	BEL -	FRA; 3	FRA; 3	TCH; 1	TCH; 1	POL; 5	POL -	NED -	NED -	LUX; 2	LUX; 2	FIN; 3	FIN -	USR; 5	USR; 5	GER; 3	GER; 4	ITA; 4	ITA -	UK; 4	UK; 5	SWE; 3	SWE; 4	GDR -	GDR; 2	4th	31
1963	250cc	ČZ	ESP -	ESP -	ITA -	ITA -	FRA; 3	FRA; 2	CH; 2	CH -	GER; 2	GER; 2	LUX; 2	LUX; 2	NED; 1	NED; 2	UK; 2	UK; 3	SWE -	SWE -	FIN; 2	FIN; 2	USR; 1	USR; 3	POL; 1	POL; 2	TCH; 1	TCH; 1	GDR -	GDR; 1			2nd	50
1963	500cc	ČZ	AUT -	AUT -	CH -	CH -	DEN -	DEN -	NED -	NED -	FRA -	FRA -	ITA -	ITA -	TCH; 1	TCH; 2	USR -	USR -	UK -	UK -	BEL -	BEL -	LUX -	LUX -	GDR -	GDR -							9th	6
1964	250cc	Jawa	ESP -	ESP; 3	BEL; 6	BEL; 4	CH; 2	CH; 10	TCH -	TCH; 3	GER; 3	GER; 6	LUX; 8	LUX; 3	ITA; 9	ITA; 11	UK -	UK; 3	SWE; 5	SWE; 5	FIN -	FIN; 5	USR; 6	USR; 7	POL -	POL -	GDR -	GDR; 1	FRA; 4	FRA; 3			7th	16
1965	250cc	Jawa	ESP -	ESP -	ITA; 6	ITA; 4	FRA -	FRA -	BEL; 3	BEL; 6	TCH; 2	TCH; 1	GER -	GER -	NED; 4	NED; 4	LUX; 6	LUX; 5	POL; 6	POL; 5	USR; 4	USR -	GDR; 2	GDR; 12	UK; 3	UK; 5	SWE; 3	SWE -	FIN -	FIN; 5	AUT -	AUT -	6th	28
1966	500cc	ČZ	CH; 3	CH; 2	AUT; 4	AUT; 4	ITA; 4	ITA; 3	DEN -	DEN -	SWE; 6	SWE; 4	FIN; 6	FIN; 6	GDR; 4	GDR; 6	TCH; 2	TCH; 6	USR; 2	USR; 3	UK; 3	UK -	NED; 4	NED; 4	BEL; 6	BEL; 6	LUX; 5	LUX; 5	GER; 1	GER; 3			4th	34
1967	500cc	Jawa	AUT; 8	AUT; 10	ITA; 5	ITA; 4	SWE -	SWE; 3	TCH; 4	TCH -	USR; 3	USR; 3	FRA; 2	FRA; 1	GER; 4	GER; 7	UK; 5	UK; 4	BEL; 6	BEL; 5	LUX; 3	LUX -	CH; 5	CH; 2									4th	26
1968	500cc	Jawa	AUT; 4	AUT; 24	ITA; 8	ITA -	SWE; 3	SWE -	FIN -	FIN -	GDR; 3	GDR; 5	TCH -	TCH -	UK -	UK -	GER; 6	GER; 8	FRA; 7	FRA; 27													11th	8
1968	500cc	ČZ																			NED; 17	NED; 11	BEL; 10	BEL; 8	LUX; 3	LUX; 6	CH; 6	CH; 7					11th	8
1970	500cc	ČZ	CH -	CH -	AUT -	AUT -	NED -	NED -	FRA -	FRA -	FIN -	FIN -	SWE -	SWE -	TCH; 9	TCH; 8	USR -	USR -	GER -	GER -	GDR -	GDR -	BEL -	BEL -	LUX -	LUX -							28th	4
1971	500cc	ČZ	ITA -	ITA -	AUT -	AUT -	SWE -	SWE -	FIN -	FIN -	TCH; 13	TCH; 11	USR -	USR -	GDR -	GDR -	UK -	UK -	GER -	GER -	BEL -	BEL -	LUX -	LUX -	NED -	NED -							28th	1
1972	500cc	Jawa	AUT; 3	AUT; 7	CH; 14	CH; 10	SWE -	SWE -	FRA; 11	FRA; 7	USR -	USR -	TCH; 7	TCH -	UK; 14	UK; 12	GER; 11	GER; 9	GDR; 8	GDR -	BEL; 12	BEL; 13	LUX -	LUX -									14th	16
