= Rolf Tibblin =

Swedish motorcycle racer

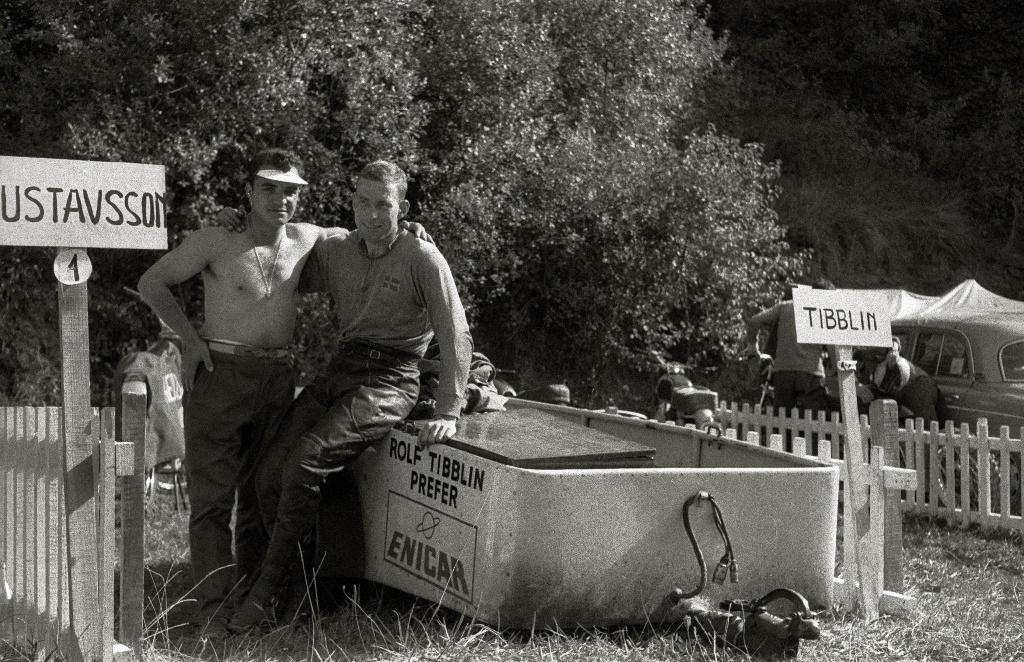
- Tibblin (right) with an unidentified person at a race meeting in Spain
- Nationality: Swedish
- Born: 7 May 1937 (age 89) Stockholm, Sweden

Motocross career
- Years active: 1957–1967
- Teams: Husqvarna, ČZ
- Championships: 500cc- 1962, 1963
- Wins: 29

Rolf Tibblin (born 7 May 1937) is a Swedish former professional motocross racer. He competed in the Motocross World Championships from 1957 to 1967, most prominently as a member of the Husqvarna factory racing team where he was a two-time 500cc Motocross World Champion. His motorcycle racing career spanned the transition from the heavy, four-stroke motorcycles of the 1950s, to the lightweight two-stroke motorcycles of the 1960s. He was one of the first motocross competitors to stress the importance of a rigorous physical fitness training regimen.

Tibblin was part of a contingent of Swedish motorcyclists including; Bill Nilsson, Sten Lundin and Torsten Hallman who dominated the sport of motocross in the early 1960s. He was a member of Swedish teams that won two consecutive Motocross des Nations events (1961–1962) and was the top individual points scorer at the 1962 event. Tibblin was also an accomplished enduro racer, finishing as the top individual points scorer at the 1960 International Six Days Trial. After his World Championship career, he competed in desert racing, winning the prestigious Baja 1000 off-road race in 1972. Tibblin was inducted into the A.M.A. Motorcycle Hall of Fame in 2008.

== Motorcycle racing career ==
Tibblin was born in the Sollentuna Municipality on the north side of Stockholm, Sweden on May 7, 1937. As a youth, he participated in the sports of ice hockey and football. He showed enough promise in football that he trained with the Turebergs Athletic Club, however he didn't enjoy the club's slave driving mentality in regards to training. Convinced that physical training should be enjoyable, his interests turned to motorcycle racing and he joined the local Upplands Väsby Motorcycle Club. Tibblin regarded the physical training as an absolute must in order to become a successful rider.

In 1954 at the age of 17, Tibblin began competing in motocross and enduro competitions. Although he lacked natural riding talent, he persevered and by 1956 he won a local Swedish championship riding a BSA motorcycle. In 1957, Tibblin scored an impressive fourth place at the 500cc Swedish Motocross Grand Prix aboard his BSA and ended the season ranked 12th in the 500cc Motocross World Championship.

Tibblin's impressive performance got the attention of the Husqvarna factory who offered him support for the 1958 season. Tibblin entered the 250cc European Motocross Championship (the predecessor to the 250cc Motocross World Championship) where he scored his first victory in international competition by winning the 250cc West German Grand Prix and finished the season ranked second in the final point standings to Jaromír Čížek (ČZ).

In the 1959 250cc European Motocross Championship, Tibblin won the first heat race at the season-opening 250cc Austrian Grand Prix, but suffered an eye injury after crashing in the second heat race which forced him to miss the next three rounds. He returned to compete in the East German Grand Prix, but was forced to abandon the race as his eye injury made it difficult for him to focus. Tibblin then scored two third place finishes at the 250cc Polish Grand Prix before he went on a winning streak, winning six of the final seven rounds to claim his first major championship. He clinched the European Championship at the 250cc Luxembourg Grand Prix by lapping the entire field with the exception of second placed Brian Stonebridge (Greeves}.

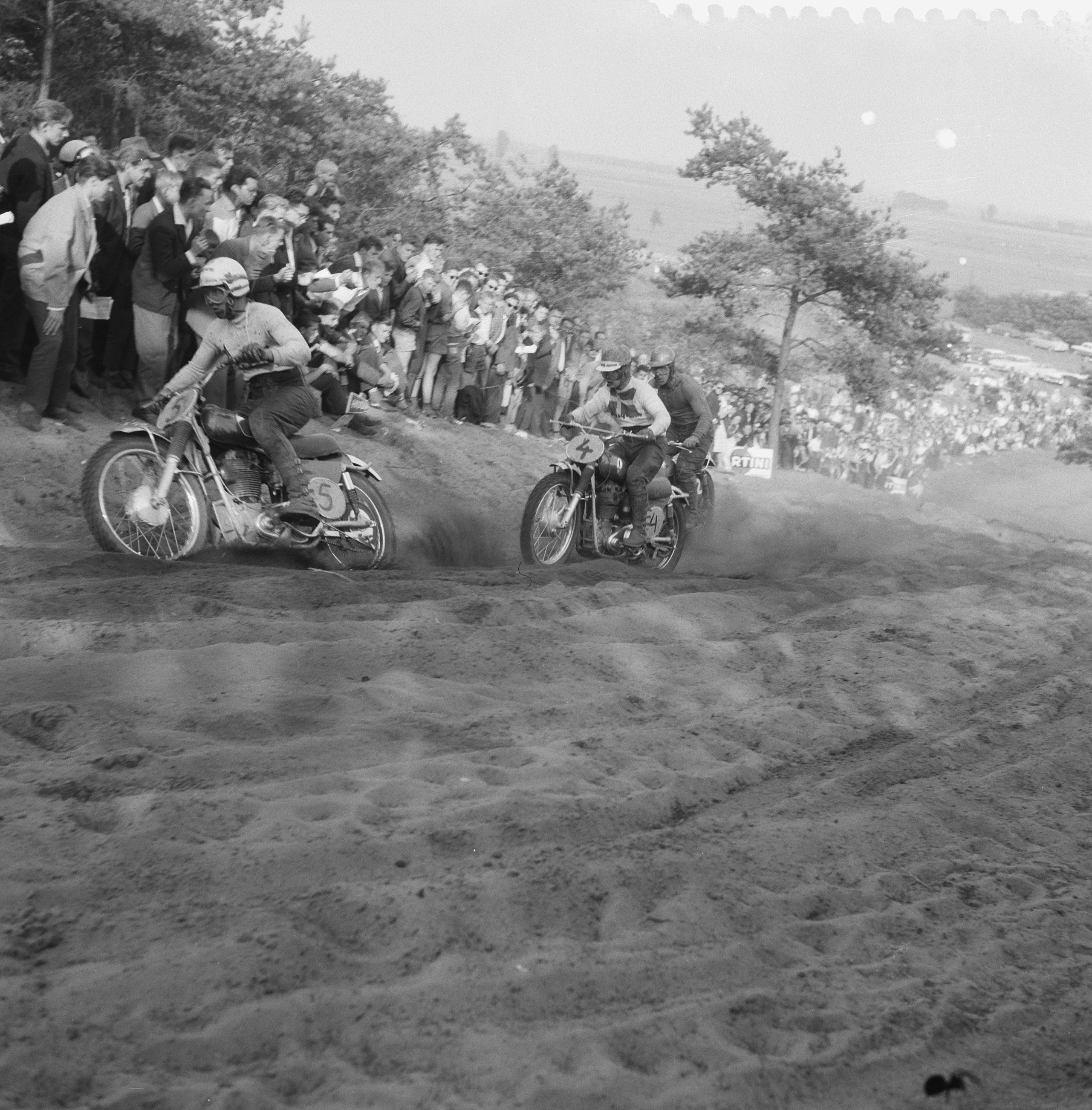
Tibblin (5) leads Bill Nilsson (4) at the 1960 500cc Dutch Grand Prix held in Bergharen.

The Swedish Monark factory's victory in the 1959 500cc Motocross World Championship prompted the Husqvarna factory to build their own 500cc motocross machine using the same Swedish-built Albin four-stroke engine that the Monark factory had used in their motorcycle. The Albin engine had originally been designed for military motorcycles during the Second World War. The Husqvarna factory built two motorcycles for the 1960 500cc Motocross World Championship and hired Tibblin along with his compatriot and 1957 500cc World Champion, Bill Nilsson, as their team riders.

The early 1960s marked a period of Swedish domination in the Motocross World Championships as five of the top six competitors in the 1960 500cc World Championship were from Sweden with only fourth-placed British rider Don Rickman (Triumph) breaking up the Swedish monopoly. Tibblin won the first two Grand Prix races of the season in Austria and France, but then his luck changed, and he was overtaken by Husqvarna teammate Bill Nilsson and Sten Lundin (Monark) to finish the season in third place.

At the 1960 International Six Days Trial held at Bad Aussee, Austria, Tibblin was the top individual points scorer. The International Six Days Trial is a form of off-road motorcycle Olympics that is the oldest annual competition sanctioned by the FIM, dating back to 1913. Tibblin also competed in other enduro events during this period, including five consecutive victories in the grueling Novemberkåsan Enduro from 1960 to 1964.

In 1961, Tibblin suffered a broken leg early in the season and dropped to fifth place in the final standings of the 500cc World Championship. However, he returned in late August when he was the top individual points scorer at the 1961 Motocross des Nations event, leading the Swedish team to victory.

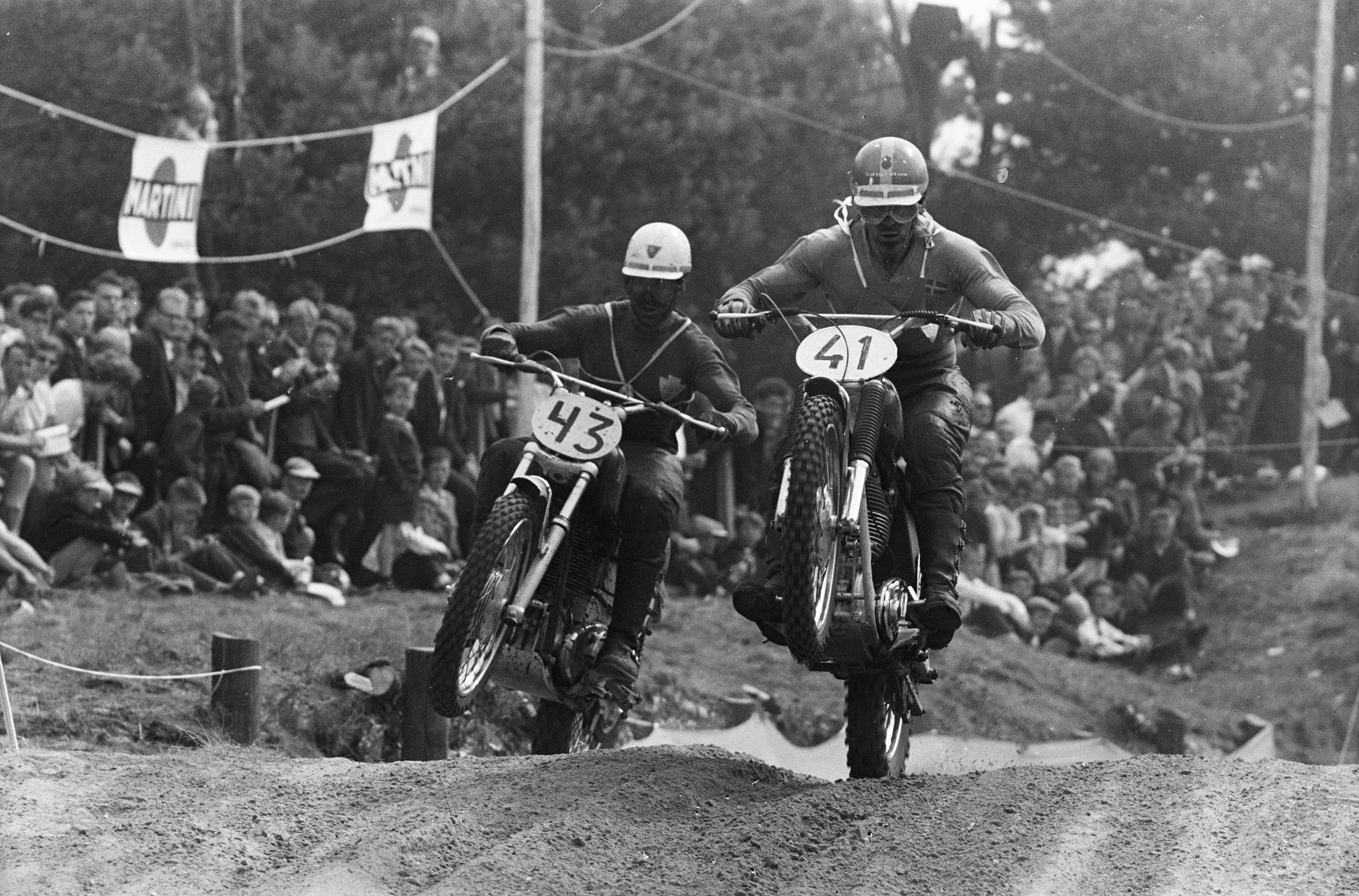
Rolf Tibblin (41) leads Gunnar Johansson (43) at the 500cc Dutch Grand Prix on 29 July 1962.

Tibblin returned to form in the 1962 500cc World Championship, winning five of the ten Grand Prix races to claim his first premier class title by four points over his compatriot Gunnar Johansson in second place. Sweden continued to dominate international motocross with Swedish riders taking the top five places in the 500cc Class final standings for 1962. His Husqvarna teammate, Torsten Hallman, won the 250cc Motocross World Championship giving the Husqvarna factory both of the FIM motocross world titles. Tibblin repeated his performance at the 1962 Motocross des Nations event, where he led the Swedish team to victory as the top individual points scorer.

Tibblin successfully defended his crown in the 1963 FIM Motocross World Championship, taking five victories out of twelve races to become the first competitor to win back to back 500cc World Championships. Hallman repeated as the 250cc Motocross World Champion in 1963 to put the Husqvarna factory at the top of the motocross hierarchy by claiming both world championships for the second consecutive year. However, a significant moment in motocross history occurred during the 1963 season when ČZ factory rider Vlastimil Válek rode a 263cc two-stroke motorcycle to defeat Tibblin in the first moto of the 500cc Czechoslovak Grand Prix. The victory was a turning point in motocross history as, it marked the first time that a two-stroke powered motorcycle had won a 500cc Motocross World Championship race.

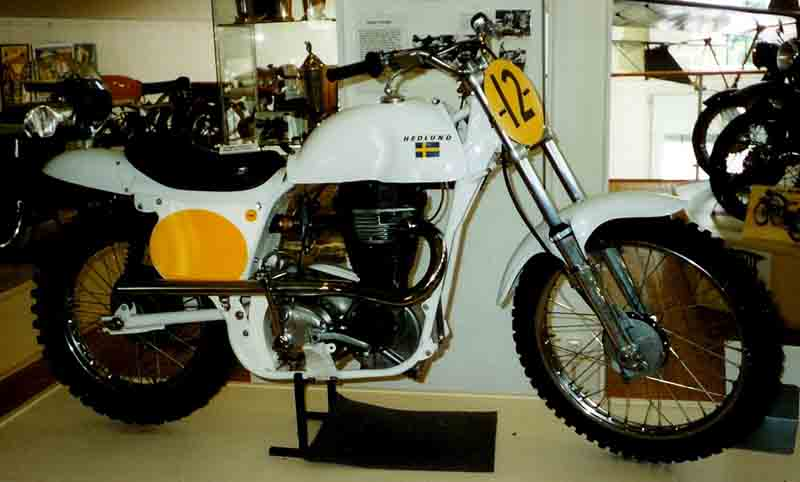
A replica of the Hedlund motorcycle raced by Tibblin in 1965. Within a few years, four-stroke motorcycles such as this one would be rendered obsolete by advancements in two-stroke engine technology.

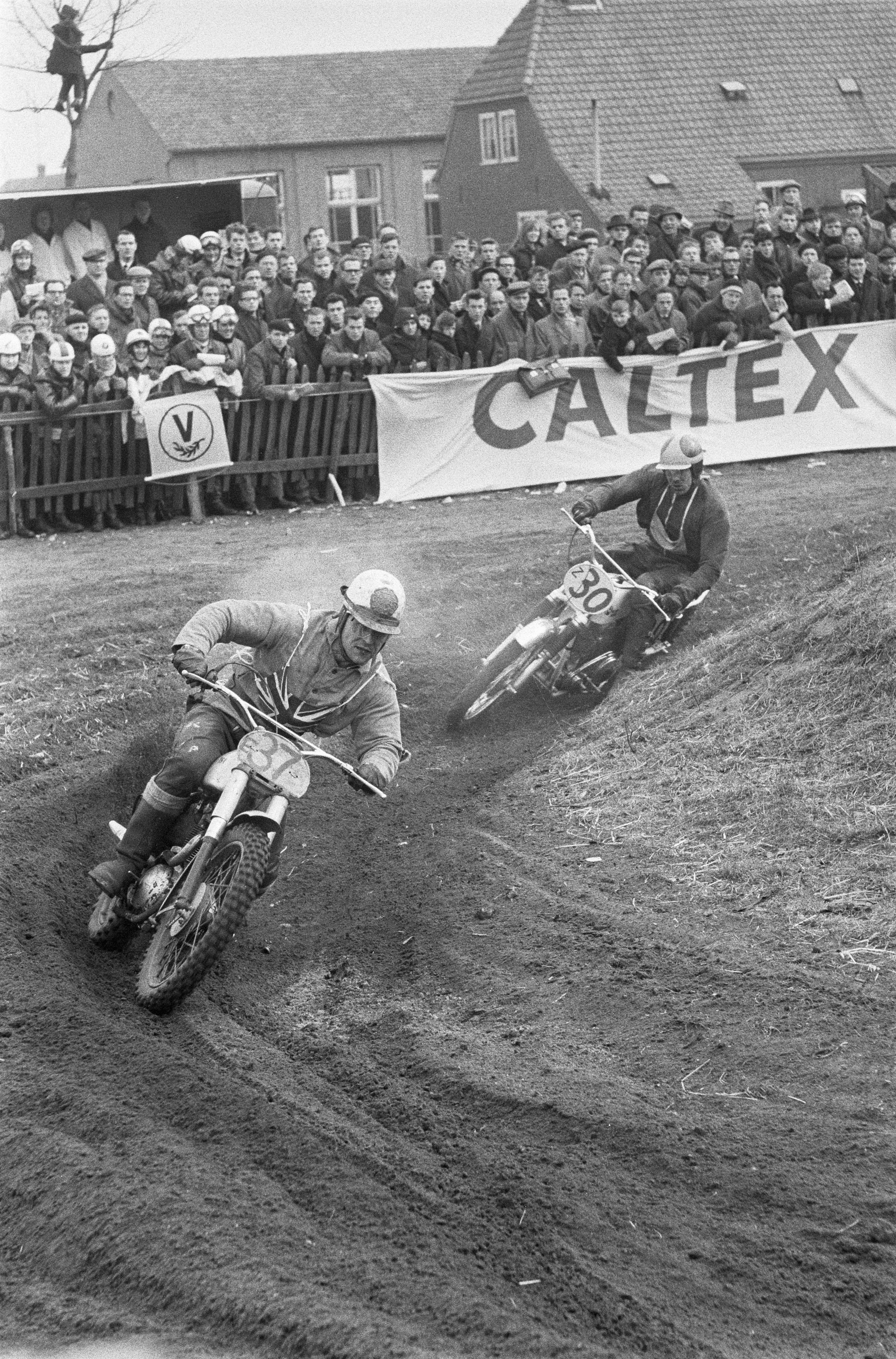
Jeff Smith (37) leads Rolf Tibblin (30) during a race held in St. Anthonis, Holland in 1964.

The Husqvarna factory stopped producing their four-stroke motorcycles in 1963, leaving Tibblin without a motorcycle for the 1964 season. He teamed up with a Swedish master engine builder named Nisse Hedlund who was the man responsible for the development of the Albin engine used to power Monark and Husqvarna motorcycles. The two men built a complete motocross machine in time for the 1964 season. Tibblin began the season strongly, winning five of the first six races of the season, but he faced strong opposition from BSA factory rider, Jeff Smith. Smith consistently scored points throughout the season and only once finished below third place, as the championship wasn't decided until the final race of the season in Spain, where Smith took the victory to claim the World Championship by only two points over Tibblin.

Tibblin's 1965 season started with an accident before the first race of the season. Tibblin and Nilsson were test riding motorcycles in their hotel parking lot when they collided in a blind corner. Neither of the riders were wearing their riding gear and Nilsson suffered a broken arm, an amputated toe and a concussion, while Tibblin lost the end of his little finger and also received a concussion which forced him to sit out the start of the season.

By 1965, advances in two-stroke engine technology made apparent the importance of lightness and agility in motocross racing. Motorcycles powered by two-stroke engines weighed significantly less than four-stroke motorcycles, thus took less effort to ride over unforgiving terrain. These advances rendered heavy four-stroke motorcycles obsolete. Upon his return from his injuries, Tibblin was forced to join the Czechoslovak ČZ team in order to remain competitive. He won the Italian and German Grand Prix races, but was unable to make up lost ground and dropped to third place in the final standings behind Smith and his ČZ teammate, Paul Friedrichs.

Tibblin won two Grand Prix races in 1966 and ended the season ranked second to his teammate Friedrichs who dominated the season by winning eight Grand Prix races. Friedrichs victory on the ČZ marked the first time that a two-stroke motorcycle had won the premier 500cc division. In the spring of 1967, Tibblin suffered a broken arm while competing in a pre-season race in Sint Anthonis, Holland, forcing him to retire from World Championship competition at the age of 30.

== Motocross career overview ==
Tibblin won 54 individual heat races and 29 Grand Prix victories during his world championship racing career. He won two 500cc motocross world titles (1963, 1964}, a 250cc European Motocross Championship (1959), four 500cc Swedish Motocross Championships (1962-1965) and one 250cc Swedish national motocross championship (1959). He was a member of two victorious Swedish Motocross des Nations teams (1961, 1962). Tibblin was also the top individual points scorer at the 1961 and 1962 Motocross des Nations events.

== Later life ==
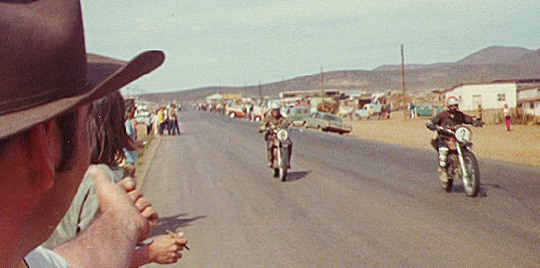
Rolf Tibblin (left) and Mickey Quade competing in the 1972 Baja 1000 at Camalu, Mexico.

Seeking new challenges, Tibblin moved his family to the United States in 1971 where he operated the "Husqvarna International Training Center"; a motocross school in Carlsbad, California during the mid-1970s as the sport enjoyed a boom in popularity. He also began to compete in desert racing, teaming with Gunnar Nilsson to win the prestigious Baja 1000 off-road race on a Husqvarna in 1972. He also won the 1972 Mint 400 desert race with Bob Grossi as his teammate. He repeated his Mint 400 victory in 1973 with Mitch Mayes as his teammate, and in 1976 with teammate Jack Johnson. In 1982, Tibblin won the Mint 400 Class-2 division for unlimited four wheel two-seat vehicles with co-driver Jim Temple. Tibblin later moved to Sri Lanka, where he still operates luxury bed and breakfast with his Sri Lankan wife. He also held membership with the Sri Lanka Association of Drivers and Riders (SLARDAR), supporting motor sports in Sri Lanka.

== Motocross Grand Prix Results ==
Points system from 1952 to 1968:

Position	1st	2nd	3rd	4th	5th	6th
Points	8	6	4	3	2	1

Denotes European motocross championship only.

Year	Class	Machine	1		2		3		4		5		6		7		8		9		10		11		12		13		14		Pos	Pts
Year	Class	Machine	R1	R2	R1	R2	R1	R2	R1	R2	R1	R2	R1	R2	R1	R2	R1	R2	R1	R2	R1	R2	R1	R2	R1	R2	R1	R2	R1	R2	Pos	Pts
1957	500cc	BSA	CH -	CH -	FRA -	FRA -	SWE; 5	SWE; 4	ITA -	ITA -	UK; 15	UK; 12	NED -	NED -	BEL -	BEL -	LUX -	LUX -	DEN -	DEN -											12th	3
1958	250cc	Husqvarna	AUT -	AUT -	CH -	CH -	FRA -	FRA -	TCH -	TCH -	UK -	UK -	GER; 1	GER; 1	ITA; 5	ITA; 3	NED; 1	NED; 2	BEL -	BEL; 2	LUX -	LUX; 4	SWE -	SWE -	POL -	POL -					2nd	27
1959	250cc	Husqvarna	AUT; 1	AUT -	CH -	CH -	BEL -	BEL -	GDR -	GDR -	TCH; 3	TCH; 3	POL; 1	POL; 17	GER; 1	GER; 1	ITA -	ITA -	FRA; 2	FRA; 1	NED; 1	NED; 1	UK; 1	UK; 1	LUX -	LUX; 1	SWE; 1	SWE; 1			1st	51
1959	500cc	Husqvarna	AUT; 6	AUT -	CH; 6	CH; 5	DEN -	DEN -	FRA; 13	FRA; 5	ITA; 12	ITA; 5	GER -	GER -	UK; 10	UK; 4	NED; 7	NED; 9	BEL -	BEL; 5	LUX -	LUX -	SWE -	SWE -							13th	4
1960	500cc	Husqvarna	AUT; 1	AUT; 1	FRA; 1	FRA; 2	SWE -	SWE -	ITA; 22	ITA -	GER -	GER -	UK; 6	UK; 6	NED; 3	NED; 1	BEL -	BEL; 4	LUX -	LUX; 8											3rd	26
1961	500cc	Husqvarna	CH -	CH -	AUT -	AUT -	FRA; NC	FRA -	TCH; 5	TCH; 4	ITA; 5	ITA; 4	UK -	UK; 6	NED -	NED -	BEL -	BEL -	LUX; 2	LUX; 10	SWE; 6	SWE; 7	GER; 3	GER; 2							5th	15
1962	500cc	Husqvarna	AUT; 1	AUT; 2	FRA; 1	FRA; 1	CH; 3	CH; 1	ITA; 2	ITA; 2	TCH -	TCH -	UK; 1	UK; 1	NED; 2	NED; 1	BEL; 2	BEL; 2	LUX; 6	LUX -	SWE; 3	SWE -									1st	56
1963	500cc	Husqvarna	AUT; 1	AUT; 4	CH; 2	CH; 7	DEN; 2	DEN; 2	NED; 2	NED; 1	FRA; 1	FRA; 1	ITA; 1	ITA; 1	TCH; 2	TCH; 1	USR; 3	USR; 2	UK; 2	UK -	BEL; 1	BEL; 1	LUX; 4	LUX -	GDR -	GDR -					1st	52
1964	500cc	Hedlund	CH; 1	CH; 2	AUT; 1	AUT; 1	DEN; 1	DEN; 2	SWE; 1	SWE; 1	NED; 3	NED; 2	FRA; 1	FRA; 1	ITA -	ITA; 1	URS -	URS; 2	TCH; 1	TCH; 1	BEL; 9	BEL -	LUX -	LUX -	GER; 5	GER; 2	GDR; 1	GDR; 2	ESP -	ESP; 1	2nd	54
1965	500cc	Hedlund	AUT -	AUT -	CH; 5	CH; 12	FRA -	FRA -	FIN -	FIN -																					3rd	32
1965	500cc	ČZ									SWE; 9	SWE; 8	GDR; 3	GDR -	TCH -	TCH; 7	URS; 4	URS; 3	UK; 3	UK; 1	ITA; 2	ITA; 1	GER; 1	GER; 1	NED; 3	NED; 2	LUX; 1	LUX -			3rd	32
1966	500cc	ČZ	CH; 2	CH; 3	AUT; 1	AUT; 2	ITA; 5	ITA; 4	DEN; 1	DEN; 2	SWE; 4	SWE -	FIN; 5	FIN; 5	GDR; 3	GDR; 4	TCH; 5	TCH; 2	URS; 6	URS; 8	UK; 8	UK; 8	NED; 1	NED; 1	BEL; 3	BEL; 4	LUX; 8	LUX; 7	GER -	GER -	2nd	40
1967	500cc	ČZ	AUT -	AUT -	ITA -	ITA -	SWE; 8	SWE; 5	TCH -	TCH -	USR -	USR -	FRA -	FRA -	GER -	GER -	UK -	UK -	BEL -	BEL -	LUX; 7	LUX; 5	CH -	CH -							15th	4
