= 1957 Motocross World Championship =

Motocross championship season

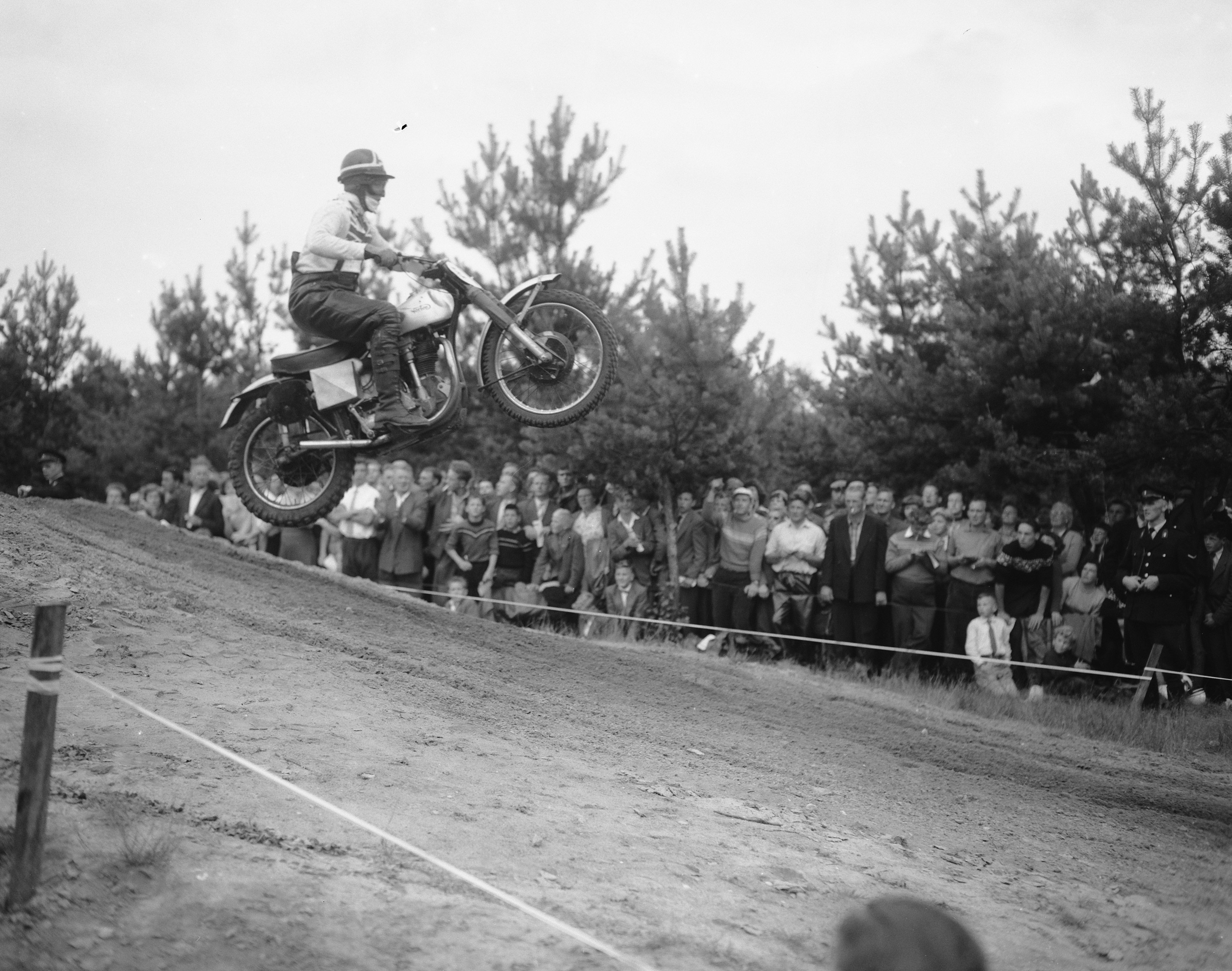
- Les Archer Jr. during the 500cc Netherlands GP, held in Lichtenvoorde on 28 July 1957.
- Organizer: FIM
- Duration: From 5 May to 25 August
- Number of races: 9
- Number of manufacturers: 7

Champions
- 500cc: (Sweden) Bill Nilsson
- 250cc (Note: In this season still called the European Cup.): (Germany) Fritz Betzelbacher

Motocross World Championship
- ← 1956 1958 →

The 1957 Motocross World Championship was the 1st edition of the Motocross World Championship organized by the FIM and reserved for 500cc motorcycles.

== Summary ==
After five editions of the European Championship, from 1952 to 1956, the championship from 1957 took the name of the World Championship, at least for the 500cc class. The 250cc class, introduced this season, will also dispute five running-in seasons, from 1957 to 1961, a period in which it will take on the name of the European Cup, to become World Championship as well starting from the 1962 season.

From May 5 to August 25 the 500cc class held 9 grands prix which awarded points to the first six classified competitors, respectively: 8, 6, 4, 3, 2, 1. The score in the final classification of each competitor was calculated on the best four results.

== Grands Prix ==
=== 500cc ===
Round	Date	Grand Prix	Location	Winner	Team	Report
1	May 5	(Switzerland) Swiss Grand Prix	Geneva	(Belgium) Nic Jansen	Matchless	Report
2	May 19	(France) French Grand Prix	Montreuil	(United Kingdom) Les Archer Jr.	Norton	Report
3	June 2	(Sweden) Swedish Grand Prix	Saxtorp	(Sweden) Bill Nilsson	Crescent-AJS	Report
4	June 9	(Italy) Italian Grand Prix	Imola	(Sweden) Bill Nilsson	Crescent-AJS	Report
5	July 7	(United Kingdom) British Grand Prix	Hawkstone Park	(United Kingdom) Jeff Smith	BSA	Report
6	July 28	(Netherlands) Dutch Grand Prix	Lichtenvoorde	(Sweden) Bill Nilsson	Crescent-AJS	Report
7	August 4	(Belgium) Belgian Grand Prix	Namur	(Sweden) Sten Lundin	Monark	Report
8	August 11	Luxembourg Grand Prix	Ettelbruck	(Sweden) Sten Lundin	Monark	Report
9	August 25	(Denmark) Danish Grand Prix	Næstved	(Belgium) René Baeten	FN	Report

=== 250cc ===
Round	Date	Grand Prix	Location	Winner	Team	Report
1	May 5	(Switzerland) Swiss Grand Prix	Geneva	(Czech Republic) Jaromír Čížek	Jawa	Report
2	May 19	(France) French Grand Prix	Montreuil	(Belgium) Alex Colin	NSU	Report
3	May 30	(Germany) German Grand Prix	Brühl	(Belgium) Marcel Verhaegen	BSA	Report
4	June 15	(Germany) German Grand Prix	Reutlingen	(Germany) Fritz Betzelbacher	Maico	Report
5	August 4	(Belgium) Belgian Grand Prix	Namur	(Germany) Willi Oesterle	Maico	Report
6	August 11	Luxembourg Grand Prix	Ettelbruck	(Germany) Fritz Betzelbacher	Maico	Report
7	August 18	(Belgium) Belgian Grand Prix	Genk	(Germany) Willi Oesterle	Maico	Report
8	September 22	(Austria) Austrian Grand Prix	Sittendorf	(Germany) Fritz Betzelbacher	Maico	Report

== Final standings ==
Points are awarded to the top 6 classified finishers.

Position	1st	2nd	3rd	4th	5th	6th
Points	8	6	4	3	2	1

=== 500cc ===
Pos	Rider	Machine	CH (Switzerland)	FRA (France)	SWE (Sweden)	ITA (Italy)	GBR (United Kingdom)	NED (Netherlands)	BEL (Belgium)	LUX (Luxembourg)	DEN (Denmark)	Pts
1	(Sweden) Bill Nilsson	Crescent-AJS		2	1	1	5	1	3		3	34
2	(Belgium) René Baeten	FN	3		2	4		2	2		1	30
3	(Sweden) Sten Lundin	Monark	4				4	6	1	1	2	28
4	(United Kingdom) Jeff Smith	BSA			3	2	1	5	4			23
5	(United Kingdom) Les Archer Jr.	Norton	5	1			2	3				20
6	(Belgium) Auguste Mingels	Saroléa	2	3		5			6	3		17
7	(Belgium) Nic Jansen	Matchless	1	4			6		5	5		16
8	(United Kingdom) John Draper	BSA		6	5	3					4	10
9	(Belgium) Hubert Scaillet	FN				6				2		7
10	(Netherlands) Broer Dirkx	BSA					3					4
11	(Sweden) Gunnar Johansson	BSA						4			6	4
12	(Sweden) Rolf Tibblin	BSA			4							3
13	(Sweden) Lars Gustavsson	BSA								4		3
14	(France) René Klym	BSA		5								2
15	(Denmark) Mogens Rasmussen	Matchless									5	2
16	(United Kingdom) Geoff Ward	Norton	6									1
17	(Sweden) Sten Hammerstedt	Matchless			6							1
18	(Belgium) Herman De Soete	Matchless								6		1

=== 250cc ===
Pos	Rider	Machine	CH (Switzerland)	FRA (France)	GER (West Germany)	GER (West Germany)	BEL (Belgium)	LUX (Luxembourg)	BEL (Belgium)	AUT (Austria)	Pts
1	(West Germany) Fritz Betzelbacher	Maico			5	1	2	1	2	1	36
2	(West Germany) Willi Oesterle	Maico			3	2	1	5	1	4	29
3	(Czech Republic) Jaromír Čížek (Note: Other sources write the surname as Cisek.)	Jawa	1		2	5	4	3	3		25
4	(Belgium) Alex Colin	NSU	3	1	6		3		6		18
5	(Belgium) Marcel Verhaegen	BSA			1			4	4	5	16
6	(West Germany) Rolf Müller	Maico			4			2		2	15
7	(United Kingdom) Brian Stonebridge	Greeves	2								6
8	(France) Albert Voreux	NSU		2							6
9	(France) Maurice Bloquet	NSU		3							4
10	(West Germany) Otto Walz	Maico				3					4
11	(Austria) Herbert Hubert	Maico								3	4
12	(West Germany) Klaus Kamper	Maico				4					3
12	(France) Marcel Scharbano	Monet Goyon		4							3
14	(Czech Republic) Jaroslav Kmoch	Jawa	4								3
15	(Netherlands) Mobi Vierdag	Maico							5		2
15	(Belgium) Maurice Houssonloge	Maico					5				2
17	(France) Michel Heuqueville	Gnome Rhone		5							2
18	(United Kingdom) John Avery	Greeves	5								2
18	(Switzerland) Alfred Jegge	Motosacoche	6				6				2
20	(Switzerland) Georges Romailler	Zündapp						6			1
20	(Czech Republic) Oldrich Hamrsmid	ČZ				6					1
20	(France) Norbert René	Monet Goyon		6							1
20	(Switzerland) Daniel Brixner	Maico								6	1
