= Monark =

Bicycle, moped and motorcycle manufacturer

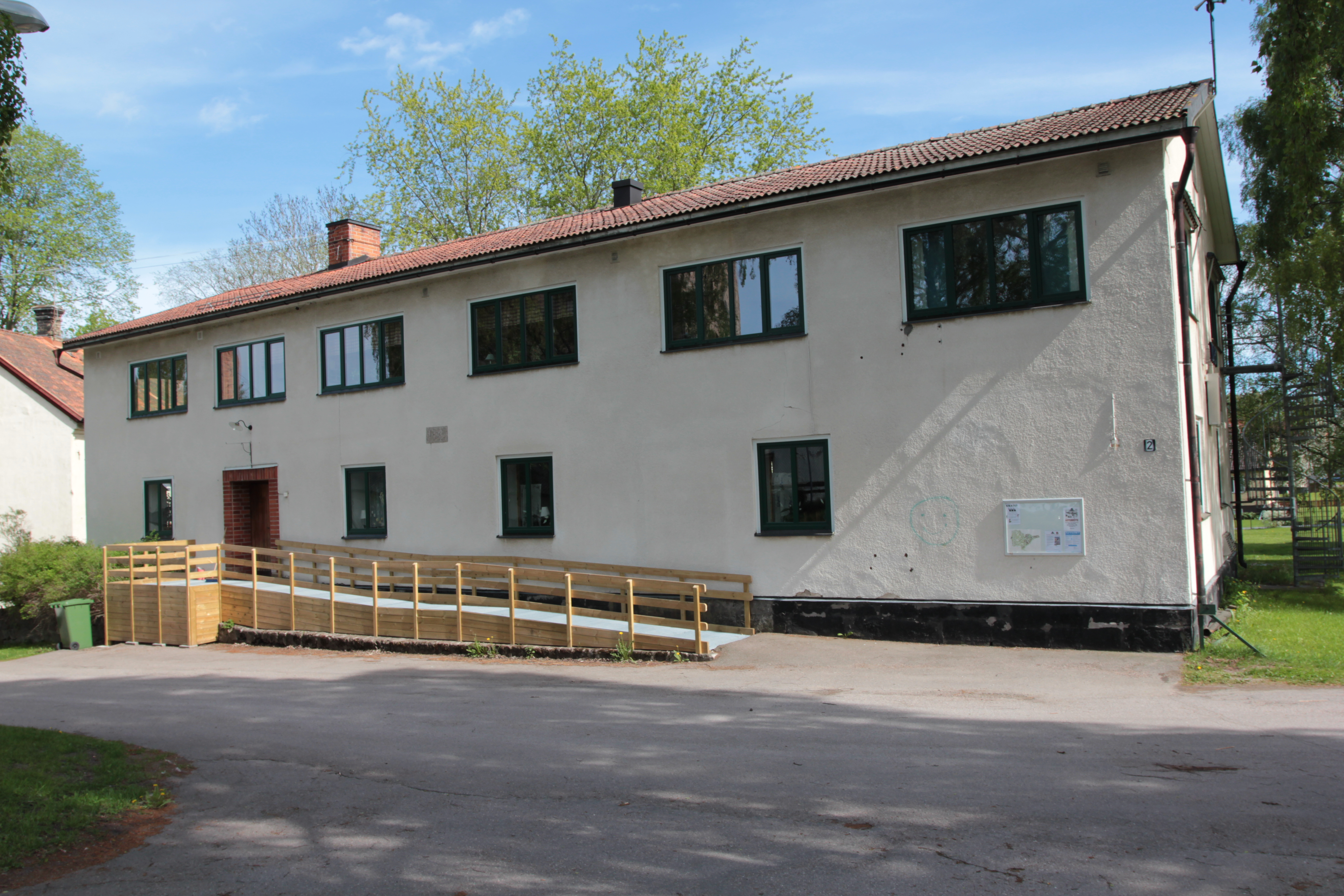
- Industry: Bicycle, moped and motorcycle manufacturer
- Founded: 1908; 117 years ago in Varberg, Sweden
- Founder: Birger Svensson
- Website: www.monark.se

Monark, also known as Cykelfabriken Monark AB and Monark AB, is a Swedish bicycle, moped and motorcycle manufacturer, established in Varberg, Sweden, in 1908 by the industrialist Birger Svensson. As of 2016, Monark was valued at 11.5 billion kr.

== Company history ==
In 1920, Monark produced its Esse model, which employed a British 172cc Villiers two stroke engine in a heavy bicycle frame. They gained popularity in Scandinavian countries because machines of this type were not required to be licensed, taxed or insured. In 1928, Monark hired Robert Ebe-Karlsson away from the Amal Carburettor Company to design a range of motorcycles using engines provided by the Blackburne motorcycle company. During this period, the Monark factory entered riders into enduro off-road events.

In the wake of the economic depression during the 1930s, Monark stopped producing motorcycles in 1936 to concentrate on a 98cc motorbike. During the Second World War, Monark produced a military motorcycle for the Swedish army, using a reliable single cylinder engine. After the war, Monark resumed production of the 98cc motorbike which remained in production until 1950.

In the 1950s, Monark had a successful record in off-road motorcycle competitions. In 1954 they entered 8 bikes in the International Six Days Trial, a form of off-road motorcycle Olympics. All 8 Monark riders finished with gold medals. In 1959, Monark's Sten Lundin won the 500cc Motocross World Championship. When the Monark racing team manager Lennart Varborn unexpectedly died during the 1960 season, Monark management made the decision to withdraw from Grand Prix racing. As compensation, Monark management allowed Lundin keep his race bike. Lundin rebadged his Monark motorcycle as a Lito and recaptured the world championship in 1961. He dropped to third place in the world championship in 1962, finished second to Rolf Tibblin in the 1963 World Championship and third in the 1964 World Championship.

In 1961, Monark merged with Nymanbolagen, Uppsala, Sweden into Monark-Crescentbolagen or MCB. Monark is today part of Cycleurope, belonging to Grimaldi Industri AB. Monark is also a brand of Brazilian bicycles, related to the original Swedish Monark AB.

Bicycle racer, Gösta Pettersson won the 1971 Giro d'Italia riding a Monark bicycle.

The Cykelfabriken should not be confused with the Monark-Silver King, Inc., Chicago, IL, a manufacturer of classic bicycles from 1934 to 1957, (formerly the Monark Battery Company). Nor should it be confused with the Monarch Cycle Manufacturing Company, 1892–1899, Chicago, New York, San Francisco and Toronto, founded by John William Kiser.

== Models (bicycles and scooters) ==
=== Electric bicycle ===
Monark produces the Elcykel, an electric bicycle, built of aluminum with the same engine system including Posten AB uses. It utilizes a 10 Ah Lithium battery for long running time and fast recharge and is equipped with a Navgenerator, approved locks and immobilizers elimination part.

- ECO 1430 – Electric bicycle with an aluminum unisex frame and a Panasonic electric motor with pedal assistance for fast and comfortable cycling. Li-ion battery of 10 Ah for fast recharge and long range.

=== Transporter ===
The Transporter is a Unisex steel work bike which is equipped with a heavy-duty front carrier and a robust kickstand. The rims are made of stainless steel and reinforced spokes They are available as Shimano Single or 3-speeds. They only come in black.

- Work Bike – The 450-453 Work Bike is a bicycle for business use that meets high visibility requirements. It is equipped with reflectors, sharp safety color, quality components are the obvious arguments. Available in 1 and 3 speed and comes in fluorescent yellow and black.
- Bayer – The Bayer is a simple and durable work bike which only comes in a step through frame and mounts a heavy-duty carrier to the front and a rack to the rear.

=== Truck ===
The Truck is a work bike, popular in Denmark, It is a steel framed work bike with a front carrier and generator lightning. It is available as a single or three speed and only comes in Black.

=== Military bike ===
The military bike is a new version of the Swedish military bicycle, it is available in a men's or women's model. The rims are made of stainless steel with reinforced spokes. The bicycles are equipped with lock and generator lighting. They are only available in red or green and come as single or 3-speeds.

=== Specialized bikes ===
Monark produces the following Specialized bikes:

- Tricycle with two 20 or 24 inch rear wheels.
- Tricycle with two front wheels
- Tandem bicycle with 3 or 7-gears
- Trailer

=== Scooters ===
Monark produces the following scooters:

- Scooter 670
- Scooter 660
- Transport scooter 634 with large front carrying platform
- Three-wheel scooter 624
