= ESO (motorcycles) =

- Founded: 1949
- Founder: Motorcycle racing rider Jaroslav Simandl
- Defunct: 1964
- Fate: Taken over by Jawa
- Headquarters: Divišov, Czechoslovakia
- Products: Motorcycles
- Parent: Jawa

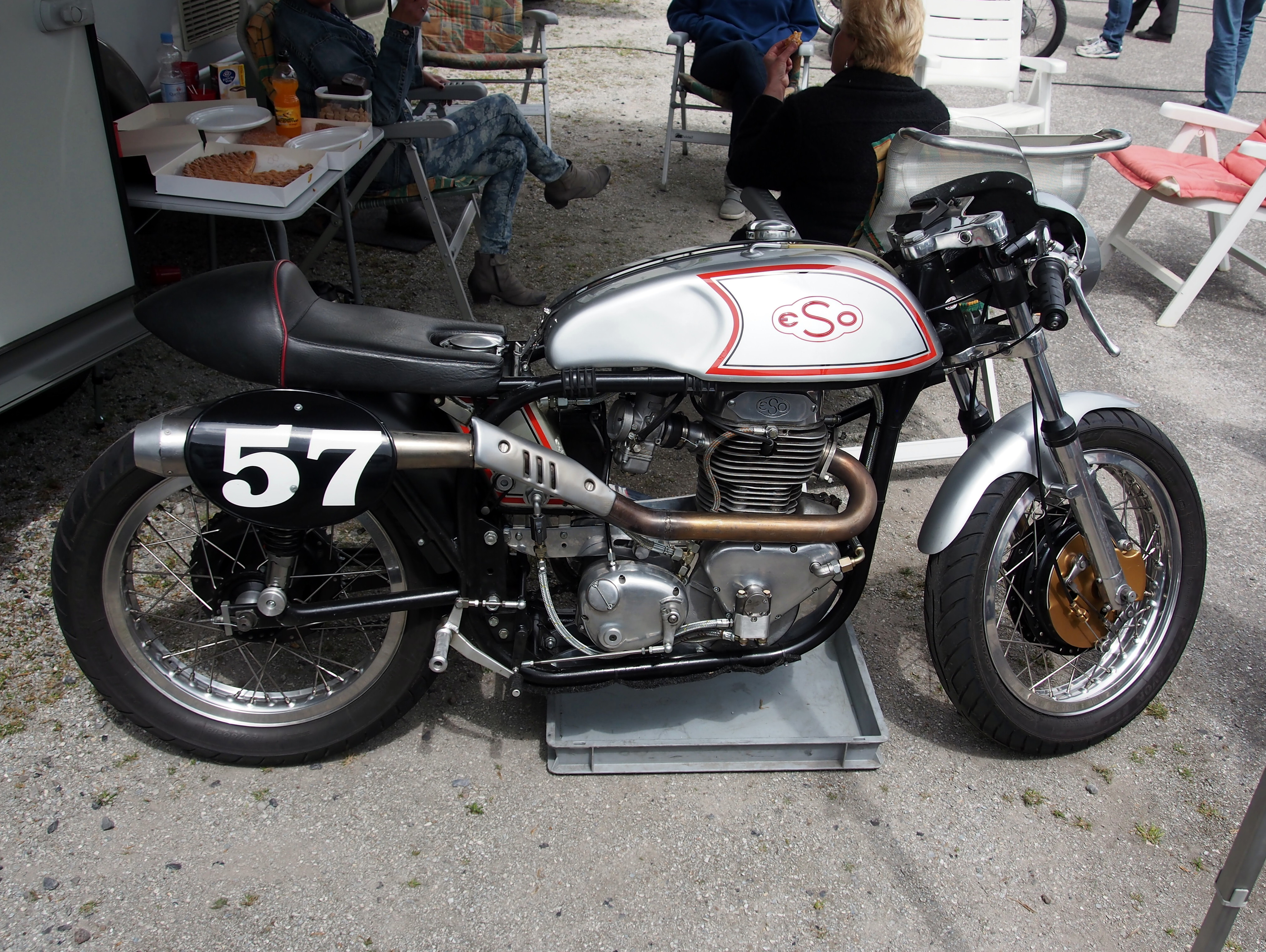

Eso was a Czechoslovak motorcycle factory producing only racing machines from 1949 until 1964, when it joined Jawa. ESO was founded by a motorcycle racing driver Jaroslav Simandl, and made bikes in 250, 350, and 500 cc, primarily for speedway, moto-cross and ice racing. Engines were sourced from J.A.P. during the first year, and then an engine of ESO's own after 1950, first copied from J.A.P. and later of their own design. The factory produced a prototype microcar in 1959, The ESO-T-250. It had a fibreglass 2-seater body with many components from Jawa-CZ.
