= Fritz Betzelbacher =

German motorcycle racer

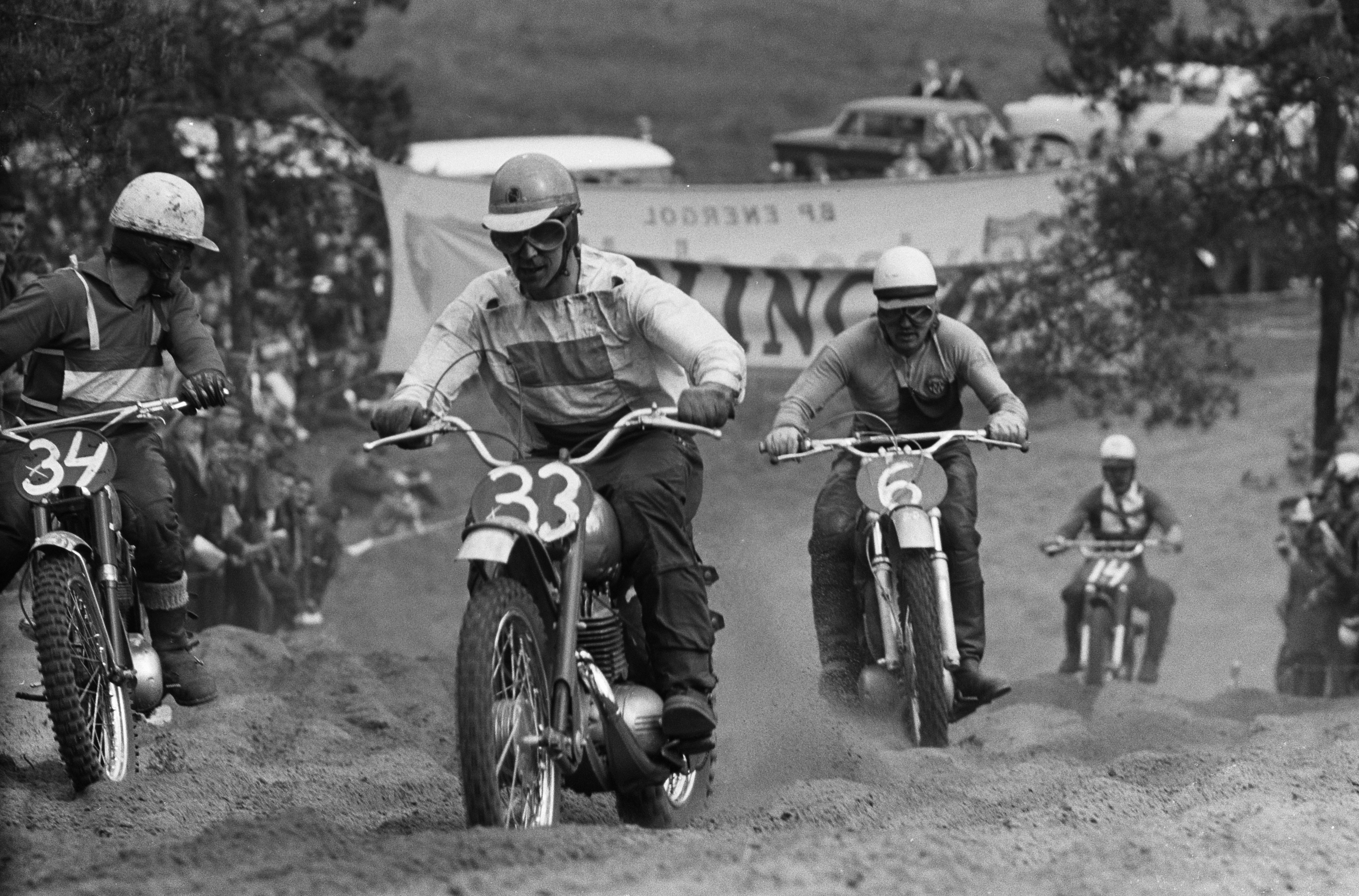
- Betzelbacher (#6) in 1962.
- Nationality: German
- Born: 18 October 1938 (age 87) Neu-Isenburg, Germany

Motocross career
- Years active: 1957- 1966
- Teams: Maico, Montesa
- Championships: 1 (1957)
- Wins: 4

Fritz Betzelbacher (born 18 October 1938) is a German former professional motocross racer. Born in Neu-Isenburg, Germany, he is notable for winning the 1957 250cc European Motocross Championship aboard a Maico motorcycle.
