= Sten Lundin =

Swedish motocross racer (1931–2016)

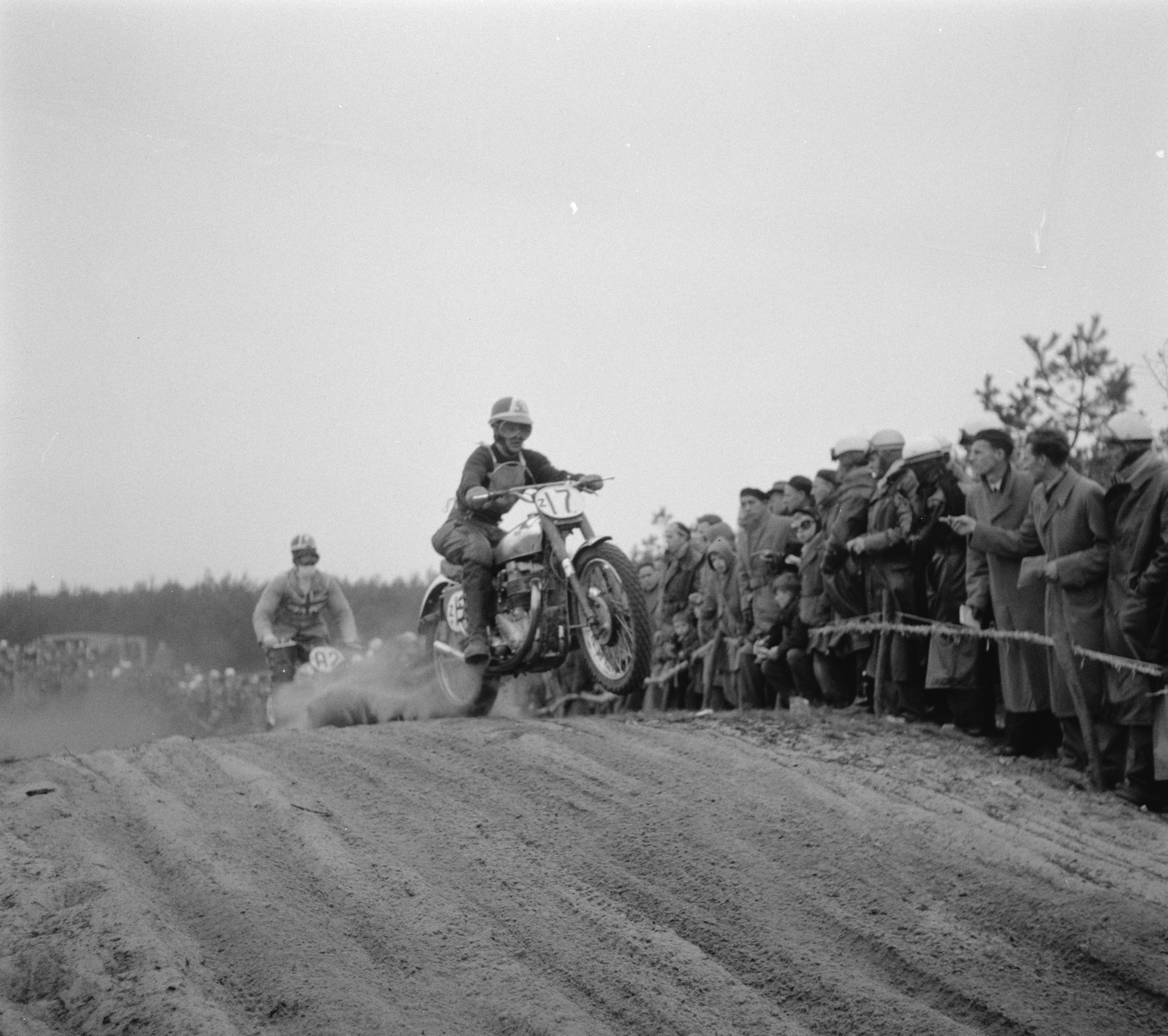
- Sten Lundin (1956)
- Nationality: Swedish
- Born: 20 November 1931 Stockholm, Sweden
- Died: 3 June 2016 (aged 84)

Motocross career
- Years active: 1953, 1955–1966
- Teams: Monark, Lito
- Championships: 500cc- 1959, 1961; 750cc European Cup- 1967
- Wins: 24

Sten Lundin (20 November 1931 – 3 June 2016) was a Swedish professional motocross racer. He competed in the FIM Motocross World Championships between 1953 and 1966. A two-time World Champion (1959, 1961), Lundin was part of a contingent of Swedish motorcyclists including; Bill Nilsson, Rolf Tibblin and Torsten Hallman who dominated the sport of motocross in the late 1950s and early 1960s. During an eight-year span from 1957 to 1964, he finished third or better in the Motocross World Championships, becoming one of the most accomplished motocross racers of his era. Lundin was distinguished by his relaxed riding style.

== Motocross career ==
=== Early racing career ===
Lundin was born in Stockholm, Sweden, on 20 November 1931. At the age of 21, he entered his first European Motocross Championship event at the 1953 500cc Swedish Grand Prix as a privateer aboard a BSA motorcycle. He made an immediate impact in his first full season by winning a heat race at the 1955 500cc French Grand Prix ahead of Les Archer Jr. (Norton). Two weeks later at the 500cc Italian Grand Prix, Lundin scored the first overall victory of his career ahead of Brian Stonebridge (BSA), becoming the second Swedish competitor to win a European Championship race after Bill Nilsson (1954 500cc Swedish Grand Prix). His victory in Italy also made him the first Swedish competitor to win a motocross Grand Prix race abroad.

Lundin won the season-ending 500cc Dutch Grand Prix to finish the 1955 season ranked third, two points behind European Champion John Draper (BSA) and one point behind vice-champion, Bill Nilsson (BSA). Lundin and Nilsson were members of the Swedish team of motorcyclists who won the 1955 Motocross des Nations event held in Randers, Denmark, marking the first time Sweden had won the prestigious event.

=== Joining the Monark team ===
After dropping to fourth place in the 1956 European Motocross Championship, Lundin was forced to switch motorcycle manufacturers from BSA to Monark due to geopolitical world events. In the wake of the 1956 Suez Crisis, the BSA factory withdrew from European racing due to fuel rationing in the United Kingdom. Without the support of the BSA factory, a group of Swedish motorcyclists decided to manufacture their own motorcycle using a Swedish-built Albin four-stroke engine that had been designed for military motorcycles during the Second World War. A complete motorcycle using the Albin engine was made by hand by engineers at the Monark factory in Varberg, Sweden. The weight of their motorcycle was significantly less than those produced by BSA or FN motorcycle factories. When the FIM upgraded the 500cc European Motocross Championship to World Championship status for the 1957 season, the Monark factory became the first Swedish manufacturer to compete in the new Motocross World Championships with Lundin as their rider.

Lundin rode the Monark to victory in the 1957 Belgian and Luxembourg Grand Prix events and ended the season ranked third in the inaugural 500cc World Championship behind Bill Nilsson (Crescent-AJS) and René Baeten (FN). Baeten dominated the 1958 season with three Grand Prix victories along with three second place results to win the 500cc World Championship. Lundin won two Grand Prix races in Italy and Sweden but failed to score consistently as he finished in third place, only one point behind his rival Nilsson. Lundin and Nilsson were once again named to the Swedish team that won the 1958 Motocross des Nations event at the Knutstorp Ring in Sweden.

The Belgian FN factory's decision to withdraw from motocross competition in 1959 forced defending champion Baeten to compete as a privateer riding a less-competitive AJS motorcycle. Lundin began the 1959 season with a victory at the Austrian Grand Prix along with a second to Nilsson (Crescent-AJS) in Switzerland, but Les Archer Jr. (Norton) then won the Danish and French Grands Prix to take the championship points lead. Lundin responded with two consecutive victories in Italy and West Germany as Archer Jr. faded in the second half of the season. Lundin's four Grand Prix victories along with two second place results earned him his first World Championship by a comfortable margin over Nilsson in second place.

Monark's victory in the 1959 500cc Motocross World Championship prompted their Swedish competitor, Husqvarna, to build their own 500cc motocross machine using the same Albin engine as used by Monark. The Husqvarna factory built two motorcycles for the 1960 500cc Motocross World Championship and hired Nilsson and his compatriot the 1958 250cc European Motocross Champion Rolf Tibblin, as their team riders. The Motocross World Championships of the early 1960s marked the beginning of a period of Swedish domination as five of the top six competitors in the 1960 500cc World Championship were from Sweden with only fourth-placed British rider Don Rickman (Triumph) breaking up the Swedish monopoly. Lundin and Nilsson (Husqvarna) would engage in a season long battle for the 1960 500cc World Championship. Nilsson won four Grand Prix races while Lundin won three as Nilsson claimed his second World Championship by just two points.

=== Lito team ===
When the Monark race team manager unexpectedly died during the 1960 season, Monark management made the decision to withdraw from Grand Prix racing. As compensation, Monark management allowed Lundin keep his race bike. Lundin painted the Monark motorcycle green and rebadged it as a Lito after his new sponsor's lithography business. He won the first three Grand Prix races of the 1961 season and led the championship from start to finish. He dominated the opposition by finishing on the podium in ten out of eleven rounds including six Grand Prix victories. His rival Nilsson (Husqvarna) was once again his top competitor for the title. Lundin helped the Swedish team win the 1961 Motocross des Nations event held in Schijndel, Holland.

The Swedish domination of the Motocross World Championships continued in 1962 with the top five competitors in the 500cc class coming from Sweden. Rolf Tibblin (Husqvarna) won five Grand Prix races to win his first world championship, with Lundin dropping to third place behind his Lito teammate, Gunnar Johansson. Lundin was a member of the victorious Swedish team that won the 1962 Motocross des Nations even in Wohlen, Switzerland.

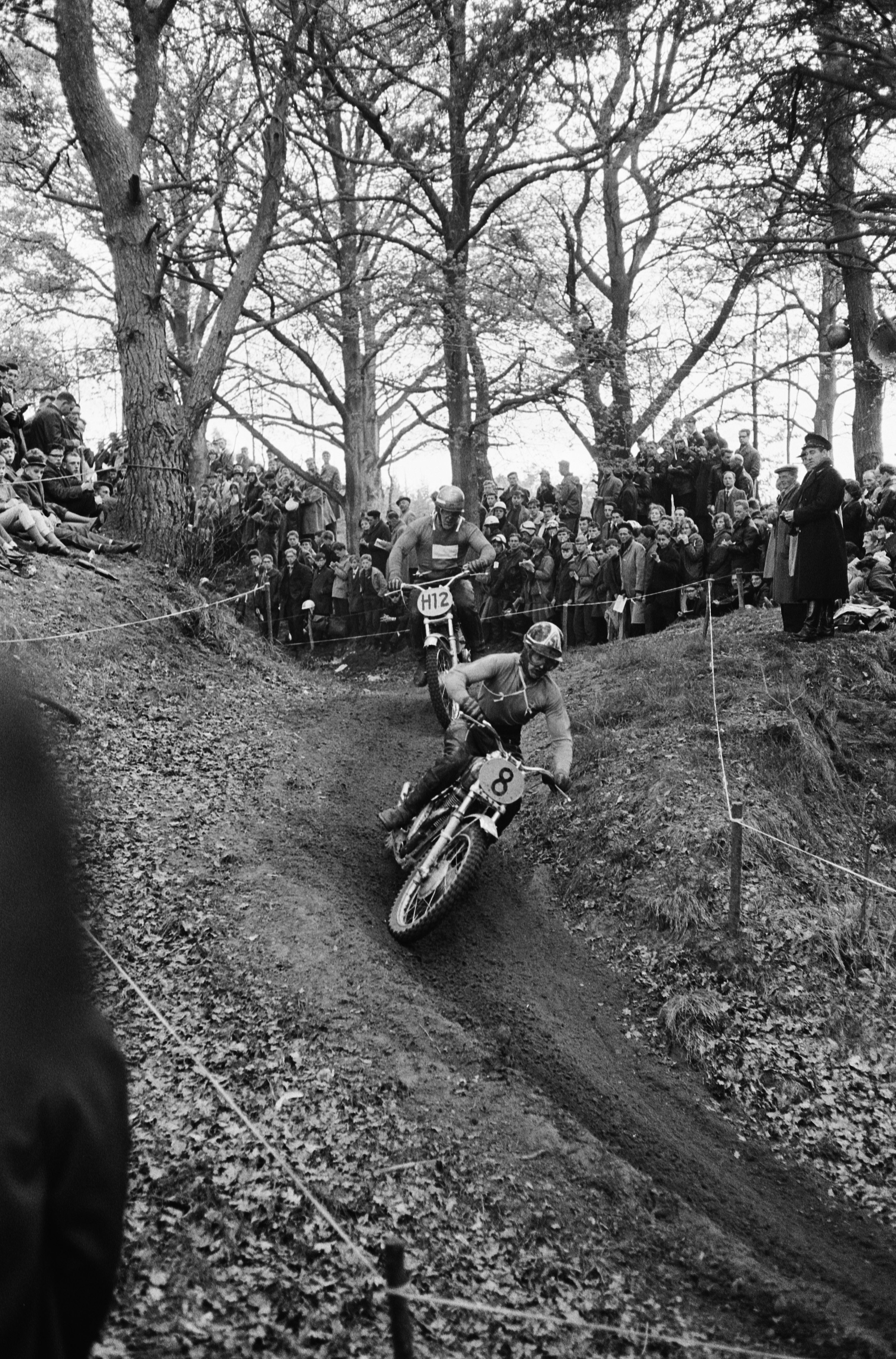
Lundin (8) competing in the 1963 500cc Dutch Grand Prix held at Markelo

Lundin started the 1963 season strongly with victories in the first two races of the season, however Tibblin (Husqvarna) successfully defended his World Championship, taking five victories out of twelve races to become the first competitor to win back-to-back 500cc World Championships. Lundin won another Grand Prix in Luxembourg and ended the season ranked second behind Tibblin. He was the top individual points scorer at the 1963 Motocross des Nations event in Knutsdorp, Sweden however, the Swedish team finished second to the British team led by Jeff Smith and Don Rickman.

A significant moment in motocross history occurred during the 1963 season when ČZ factory rider Vlastimil Válek rode a 263cc two-stroke engine powered motorcycle to win the first moto of the 500cc Czechoslovak Motocross Grand Prix ahead of a field of top-class, four stroke motorcycles. The victory marked a turning point in motocross history as, it was the first win by a two-stroke powered motorcycle in the premier division of the Motocross World Championships.

The 1964 500cc Motocross World Championship was dominated by Jeff Smith (BSA) and Rolf Tibblin (Husqvarna) however, Lundin would be the only competitor to upset the status quo by winning the West German Grand Prix. He scored consistently all year to finish the season ranked third behind the eventual World Champion Smith and runner-up Tibblin. Lundin then switched to riding a Matchless motorcycle in the 1965 season. He won his final world championship event with a victory at the 1965 500cc Austrian Grand Prix. Lundin competed in his final World Championship race at the 1966 500cc Luxembourg Grand Prix at the age of 34.

=== 750cc European Champion ===
By the mid 1960s, the heavier four-stroke motorcycles were being rendered obsolete by advances in two-stroke engine technology which made apparent the importance of lightness and agility in motocross racing. ČZ factory team rider Paul Friedrichs dominated the 1966 season by winning seven out of fourteen Grand Prix events, marking the first time a motorcycle powered by a two-stroke engine had won the premier 500cc division since the inception of the Motocross World Championships in 1957.

Lundin believed that lighter motorcycles diminished the physical challenge of motocross and could ruin the sport, so he continued to advocate for the heavier four-stroke engined motorcycles. In an effort to preserve the larger four-stroke engined motorcycles, the FIM created an experimental class for machines of 501cc to 750cc engine displacement capacity. Lundin rode his Lito to win the inaugural 1967 FIM 750cc Motocross European Cup however, the race series was abandoned after the 1969 season due to the increasing popularity of the easier-to-ride lightweight two-stroke motorcycles.

== Motocross career overview ==
Lundin won 25 individual heat races and 24 Grand Prix victories during his world championship racing career. Along with his two 500cc World Championships (1959, 1961), he won three 500cc Swedish Motocross Championships (1955, 1958, 1961). Lundin was named a member of the Swedish Motocross des Nations team for 11 consecutive years between 1955 and 1965. He took part in four Swedish Motocross des Nations victories (1955, 1958, 1961, 1962) and was the top individual points scorer at the 1963 Motocross des Nations event.

== Rally car racing career ==
In 1963, Lundin made his debut in automobile rallying driving a Volkswagen 1500 to finish second in the Finnish championship at Riihimäki. During his rally racing career, he participated in several international rallies, including the 1965 RAC Rally, where he drove a Volkswagen 1600TL along with Co-driver Lindberg Hans to finish eighth overall along with a stage victory. In 1966, his last year as a racing driver, he took part in the Rallye dei Fiori in the Italian Alps driving a Renault 8.

== Later career ==
After retiring from motorsports competition, Lundin was employed as the Service Manager at former world champion Torsten Hallman's Yamaha distributor in Sweden. In 1977 when four-stroke racing machines were rare, Lundin collaborated with Hallman and former 500cc World Champion Bengt Åberg in developing a highly modified four-stroke Yamaha XT500. Åberg rode the bike to a victory in the first moto of the 1977 500cc Luxembourg Grand Prix and ended the season ranked 9th in the final world championship standings.

In retirement, Lundin attended historic motorsport events with his Lito motorcycle. He died on 3 June 2016 at the age of 84 after a short illness.

== Awards and honors ==
In 1961 Lundin and motorcycle speedway World Champion Ove Fundin were the co-recipients of the Svenska Dagbladet Gold Medal for accomplishing the most significant Swedish sports achievement of the year. The presentation marked the first time that the prestigious award had recognized motorcycle sports.

In honor of Lundin's contributions to Swedish motorcycling, in 2002 the Swedish postal service issued a stamp within the Sverige Motocross series that depicted Lundin riding his Monark motorcycle.

== Motocross Grand Prix Results ==
Points system from 1952 to 1968:

Position	1st	2nd	3rd	4th	5th	6th
Points	8	6	4	3	2	1

Denotes European motocross championship only.

Year	Class	Machine	1		2		3		4		5		6		7		8		9		10		11		12		13		14		Pos	Pts
Year	Class	Machine	R1	R2	R1	R2	R1	R2	R1	R2	R1	R2	R1	R2	R1	R2	R1	R2	R1	R2	R1	R2	R1	R2	R1	R2	R1	R2	R1	R2	Pos	Pts
1953	500cc	BSA	CH -	CH -	NED -	NED -	FRA -	FRA -	ITA -	ITA -	UK -	UK -	BEL -	BEL -	LUX -	LUX -	SWE; 10	SWE; 10													-	0
1955	500cc	BSA	CH -	CH -	FRA; 1	FRA; 6	ITA; 4	ITA; 1	UK; 14	UK; 12	BEL -	BEL -	LUX -	LUX; 3	SWE -	SWE -	NED; 9	NED; 1													3rd	21
1956	500cc	BSA	CH; 7	CH; 4	NED -	NED; 4	ITA; 5	ITA; 3	FRA -	FRA; 6	UK; 4	UK -	BEL; 2	BEL; 2	LUX; 4	LUX -	SWE; 6	SWE; 8	DEN; 3	DEN; 3											4th	17
1957	500cc	Monark	CH; 5	CH; 4	FRA -	FRA -	SWE; 3	SWE -	ITA -	ITA -	UK; 7	UK; 3	NED; 4	NED; 6	BEL -	BEL; 1	LUX -	LUX; 1	DEN; 1	DEN; 2											3rd	28
1958	500cc	Monark	AUT -	AUT -	DEN; 3	DEN; 3	CH -	CH -	FRA; 5	FRA -	ITA; 1	ITA; 1	UK -	UK -	NED; 4	NED; 5	BEL -	BEL; 2	LUX -	LUX; 3	SWE; 7	SWE; 1									3rd	33
1959	500cc	Monark	AUT; 1	AUT; 2	CH; 4	CH; 2	DEN -	DEN -	FRA; 1	FRA; 9	ITA; 1	ITA; 1	GER; 1	GER; 6	UK -	UK -	NED -	NED; 4	BEL -	BEL; 2	LUX -	LUX; 1	SWE -	SWE; 4							1st	44
1960	500cc	Monark	AUT; 2	AUT -	FRA; 3	FRA; 1	SWE; 1	SWE; 3	ITA; 1	ITA; 2	GER; 2	GER; 1	UK; 5	UK -	NED -	NED -	BEL -	BEL; 2	LUX -	LUX; 1											2nd	36
1961	500cc	Lito	CH; 1	CH; 2	AUT; 1	AUT; 1	FRA; 1	FRA; 1	TCH; 4	TCH; 3	ITA; 2	ITA; 2	UK -	UK -	NED; 2	NED; 3	BEL -	BEL; 1	LUX; 1	LUX; 1	SWE; 3	SWE; 2	GER; 2	GER; 1							1st	48
1962	500cc	Lito	AUT; 3	AUT; 4	FRA; 2	FRA; 2	CH; 2	CH; 3	ITA; 4	ITA; 7	TCH; 2	TCH; 4	UK; 12	UK; 14	NED; 7	NED; 6	BEL; 6	BEL; 4	LUX; 2	LUX; 3	SWE; 6	SWE; 1									3rd	27
1963	500cc	Lito	AUT; 3	AUT; 1	CH; 3	CH; 1	DEN; 3	DEN; 4	NED; 4	NED; 3	FRA; 5	FRA; 6	ITA; 2	ITA; 2	TCH; 3	TCH; 3	USR -	USR -	UK -	UK -	BEL; 2	BEL; 2	LUX; 3	LUX; 2	GDR; 2	GDR; 3					2nd	46
1964	500cc	Lito	CH; 3	CH; 3	AUT; 3	AUT; 3	DEN; 3	DEN; 3	SWE; 2	SWE; 3	NED; 4	NED; 5	FRA; 2	FRA; 3	ITA; 7	ITA; 3	URS; 4	URS -	TCH -	TCH -	BEL; 5	BEL; 1	LUX -	LUX -	GER; 1	GER; 1	GDR -	GDR -	ESP; 2	ESP; 6	3rd	34
1965	500cc	Matchless	AUT; 2	AUT; 3	CH; 2	CH; 1	FRA -	FRA -	FIN -	FIN -	SWE; 6	SWE; 2	GDR; 5	GDR; 3	TCH -	TCH -	URS -	URS -	UK -	UK -	ITA; 1	ITA; 3	GER -	GER -	NED -	NED -	LUX; 2	LUX -			5th	27
1966	500cc	Lito	CH; 16	CH; 12	AUT; 9	AUT -	ITA -	ITA -	DEN -	DEN -	SWE -	SWE -	FIN -	FIN -	GDR -	GDR -	TCH -	TCH -	URS -	URS -	UK -	UK -	NED -	NED -	BEL -	BEL -	LUX; 3	LUX; 6	GER -	GER -	17th	4

Preceded by Jane Cederqvist	Svenska Dagbladet Gold Medal; 1961	Succeeded by Assar Rönnlund
