= Bill Nilsson =

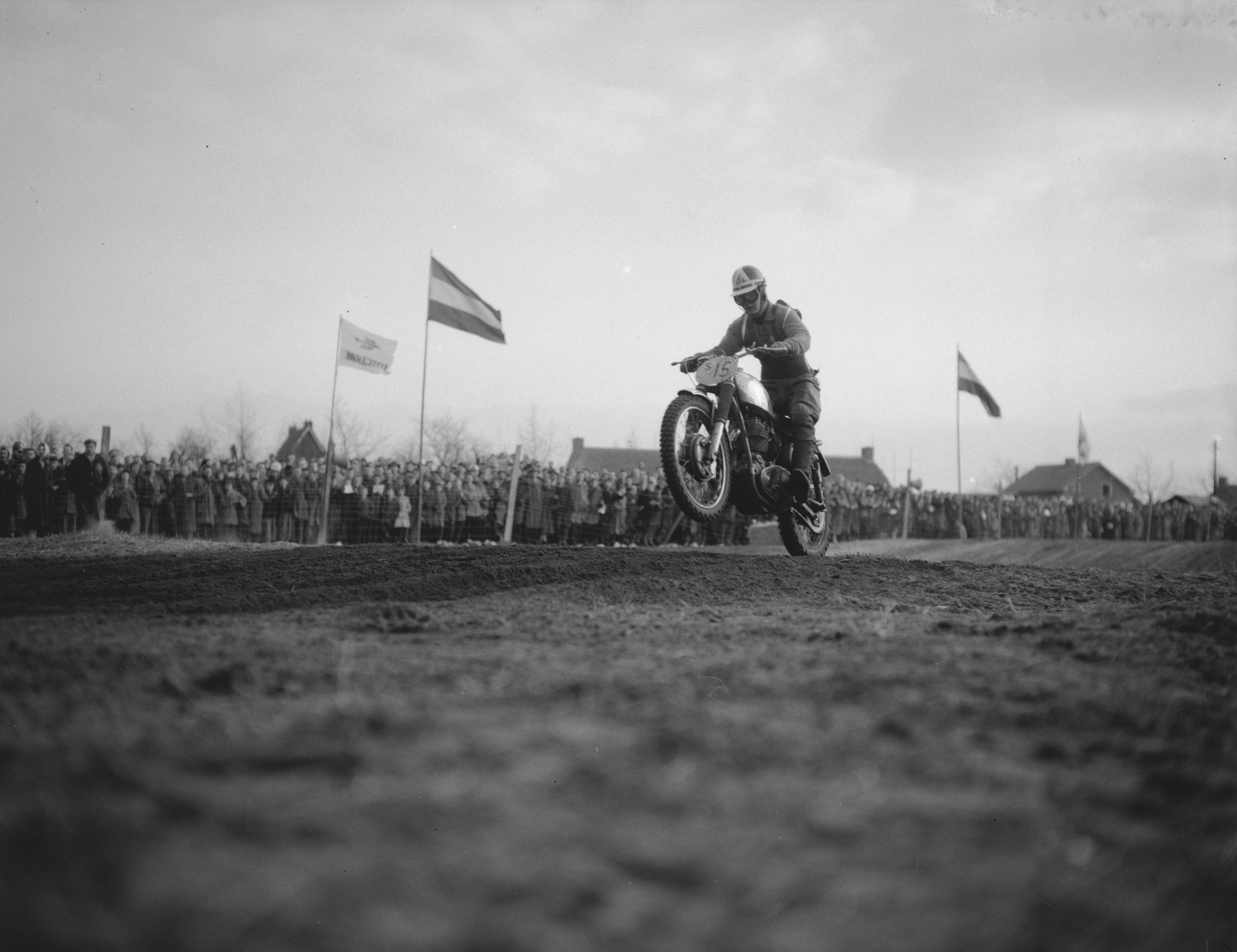
- Bill Nilsson in 1958 on a Crescent
- Nationality: Swedish
- Born: 17 December 1932 Hallstavik, Sweden
- Died: 25 August 2013 (aged 80)

Motocross career
- Years active: 1952 - 1967
- Teams: BSA, AJS, Husqvarna
- Championships: 500cc - 1957, 1960
- Wins: 18

Bill Nilsson (17 December 1932 – 25 August 2013) was a Swedish professional motocross racer. He competed in the FIM Motocross World Championships from 1952 to 1967. Nilsson won the inaugural FIM Motocross World Championship in 1957 becoming the first official Motocross World Champion. He won a second World Championship in 1960 and was the first in a long line of Swedish motorcyclists who dominated the sport of motocross in the late 1950s and early 1960s including; Sten Lundin, Rolf Tibblin and Torsten Hallman. During a five-year period from 1957 to 1961, Nilsson ranked first or second in the World Championships. He was a fiery, hot-tempered competitor known for his intimidating and aggressive riding style.

== Career ==
Nilsson was born in Hallstavik, Sweden on 17 December 1932. He began his racing career in 1950 at the age of 18 competing as a motorcycle speedway competitor, but when he failed to attract a sponsor he made the decision to switch to motocross racing.

Despite his small stature (He stood 5 ft 7 in (1.70 m) tall), Nilsson was an extremely aggressive and tenacious competitor on the racetrack and became known as one of the toughest racers in the Motocross World Championships during the 1950s. He put fear into his rivals with his rough riding style, often using his speedway racing experience to push other competitors aside.

At the age of 19, Nilsson competed in his first European Motocross Championship event at the 1952 500cc Belgian Grand Prix as a privateer aboard a Triumph motorcycle. He earned a place on the Swedish team in the 1952 Motocross des Nations held at Brands Hatch, England however, he failed to score points as the Swedish team placed third behind the British and Belgian teams.

In 1953, Nilsson gained sponsorship from Associated Motor Cycles, the parent company for AJS motorcycles. He scored his first European Championship points with AJS in 1953 with a fourth-place finish at the season opening 500cc Swiss Grand Prix. He ended the 1953 season ranked 13th in the European championship and was named to the Swedish Motocross des Nations team which once again finished third behind the British and Belgian teams.

Nilsson became one of the first factory sponsored motocross racers when he joined the BSA factory racing team for the 1954 season. At the time, the BSA factory was the largest motorcycle manufacturer in the world. Nilsson scored the first overall victory of his career when he won the 1954 500cc Swedish Grand Prix over the reigning European Champion, Auguste Mingels (FN). His victory in Sweden marked the first time that a Swedish motocross racer had won a European Motocross Grand Prix race. He also won his first 500cc Swedish motocross national championship in 1954. Nilsson was the top individual points scorer at the 1954 Motocross des Nations event in Norg, Holland as the Swedish Motocross des Nations team improved to a second-place finish behind the British team.

In the 1955 European motocross championship, the reigning champion, Auguste Mingels, injured his shoulder during the opening round in Switzerland and missed the remainder of the season. After the first six races of the season, Nilsson's BSA teammate John Draper and Sten Lundin (BSA) were leading the championship with 14 points with Nilsson trailing by 2 points. At the penultimate round in Sweden, Nilsson was leading the race and was poised to take the points lead when he crashed within sight of the finish line, allowing Draper to take the victory and win the European championship by a single point over Nilsson with Lundin in third place. Nilsson and Lundin were members of the Swedish team of motorcyclists who won the 1955 Motocross des Nations event held in Randers, Denmark, marking the first time Sweden had won the prestigious event. Nilsson finished second to Jeff Smith as the top individual points scorer.

Les Archer Jr. (Norton) dominated the 1956 season with four Grand Prix victories to claim the 500cc European Championship. Nilsson won the Italian and Swedish Grand Prix races in but failed to score consistently as he dropped to fifth place in the season final points standings. After the 1956 season, BSA management made the decision to terminate Nilsson's contract due to his rough riding tactics.

Left without sponsorship, Nilsson used his mechanical expertise to convert an AJS 7R road racing motorcycle into a motocross machine. He received financial support from the Crescent bicycle company, so he painted the motorcycle orange and labeled it a Crescent, even though it was powered by an AJS engine. When the FIM upgraded the 500cc European Motocross Championship to World Championship status for the 1957 season, Nilsson rode his homemade AJS-powered motorcycle to win three Grand Prix races and claim the inaugural FIM 1957 Motocross World Championship over René Baeten (FN). He also won the 1957 500cc Swedish national championship.

Nilsson started the 1958 season strongly with a victory at the Danish Grand Prix along with second-place results in Austria and Switzerland to take the championship points lead at mid-season. However, René Baeten (FN) responded with four consecutive podium results including victories in Belgium and Luxembourg to win the 500cc World Championship. Nilsson finished the season in second-place, only one point ahead his rival Lundin (Monark) who had won the season-ending Swedish Grand Prix. Nilsson and Lundin were once again named to the Swedish team for the 1958 Motocross des Nations event at the Knutstorp Ring in Sweden. Nilsson was the top individual points scorer at the 1958 Motocross des Nations leading the Swedish team to victory for the second time.

The Belgian FN factory's decision to withdraw from motocross competition in 1959 forced the defending World Champion, Baeten to compete as a privateer riding a less-competitive AJS motorcycle. Nilsson began the 1959 season with a victory at the Swiss Grand Prix, but Les Archer Jr. (Norton) then won the Danish and French Grands Prix to take the championship points lead. Archer Jr. faded in the second half of the season as Lundin (Monark) took the points lead with two consecutive victories in Italy and West Germany and would maintain his lead until the end of the season. Nilsson was able to win two of the last three races of the year, but it was not enough to overcome Lundin's points advantage, as he finished in second-place for the second consecutive year.

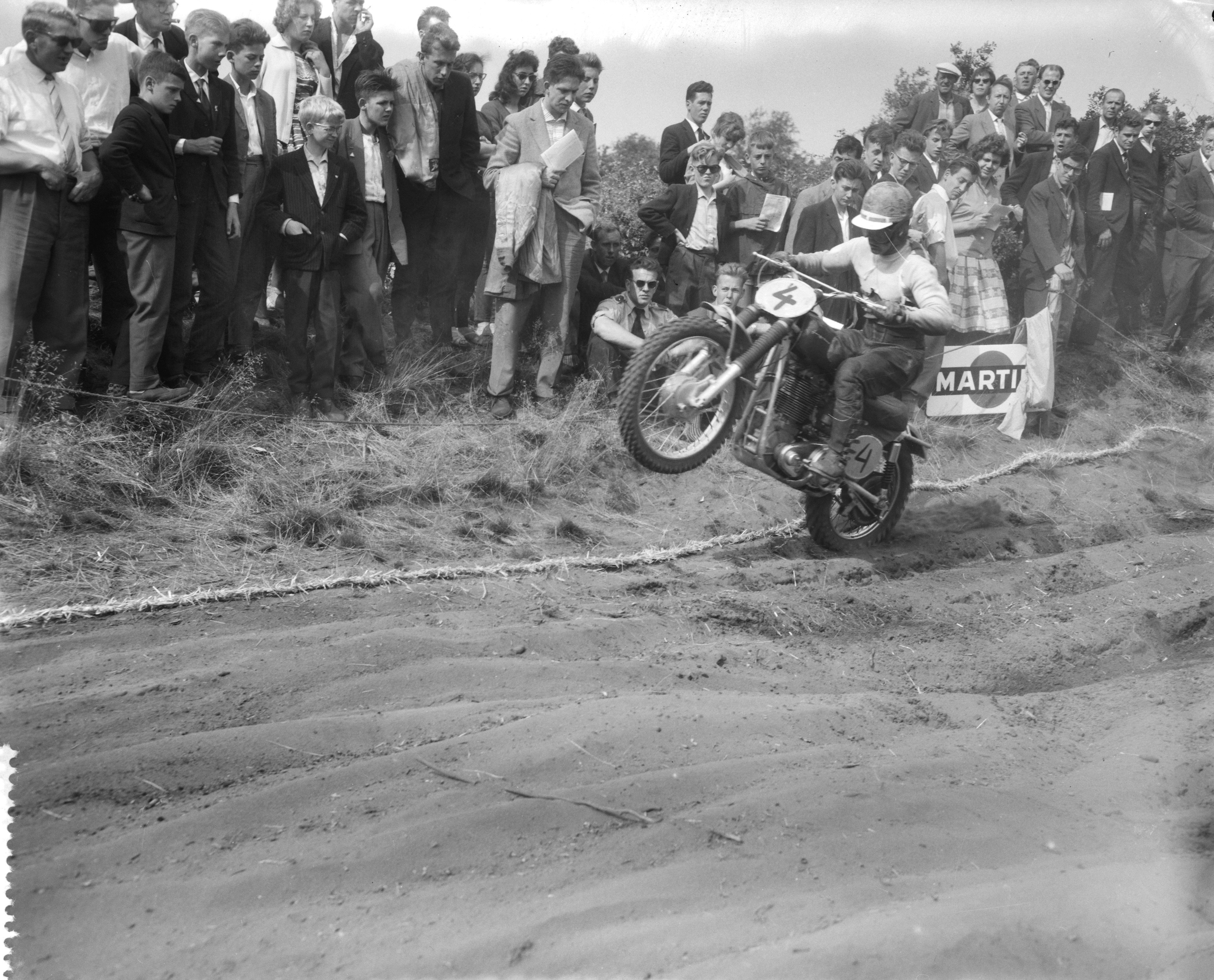
Nilsson (4) in action during the 1960 500cc Dutch Grand Prix.

The Monark factory's victory in the 1959 500cc Motocross World Championship prompted the Husqvarna factory to build their own 500cc motocross machine using the same Swedish-built Albin four-stroke engine that the Monark factory had used in their motorcycle. The Husqvarna factory built two motorcycles and hired Nilsson along with the reigning 250cc European Champion, Rolf Tibblin to be their team riders. Tibblin won the first two Grand Prix races of the season in Austria and France to lead the championship, however, the battle for the title came down to fellow Swedes Nilsson and Lundin (Monark) who engaged in a season long battle for the World Championship. Nilsson won four Grand Prix races while Lundin won three as Nilsson claimed his second World Championship by a narrow 2 point margin.

The Motocross World Championships of the early 1960s marked the beginning of a period of Swedish domination as five of the top six competitors in the 1960 500cc World Championship were from Sweden with only fourth-placed British rider Don Rickman (Triumph) breaking up the Swedish monopoly.

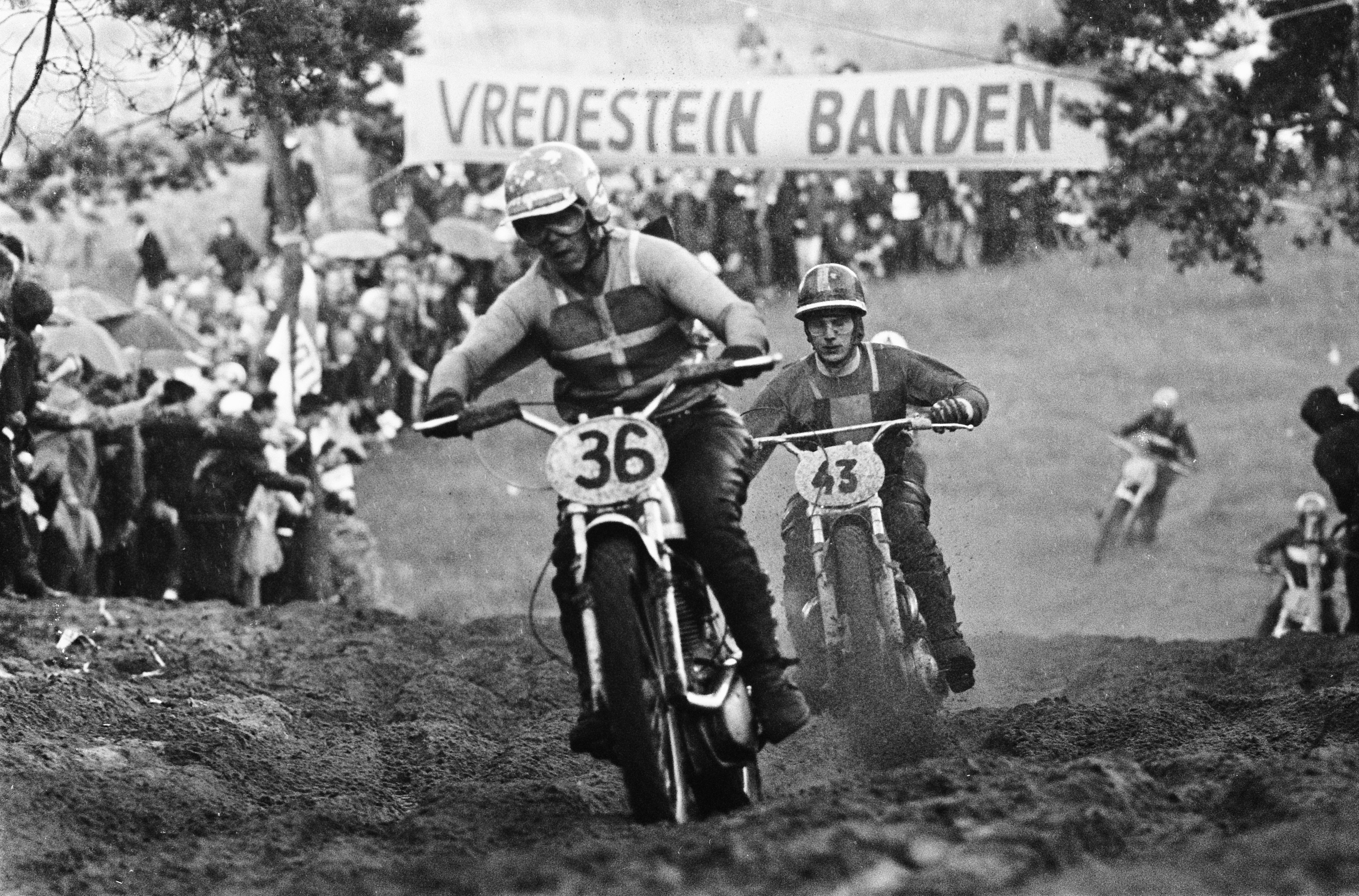
Nilsson (36) leads Jef Teeuwissen (43) at the 1965 500cc Dutch Grand Prix.

When the Monark team withdrew from Grand Prix racing after the 1960 season, they allowed Lundin keep his race bike. Lundin painted the Monark motorcycle green and renamed it a Lito after his new sponsor's lithography business. Lundin went on to dominate the 1961 season by finishing on the podium in ten out of eleven rounds including six Grand Prix victories to lead the championship from start to finish. Nilsson was his closest competitor, winning three Grand Prix races to end the season as the Vice Champion for the fourth time in his career. For the third time in his career, he was the top individual points scorer at the 1961 Motocross des Nations event held in Schijndel, Holland, leading the Swedish team to their third victory at the international event.

Nilsson began the 1962 season with the Husqvarna team but left at mid-season to design his own motorcycle using various parts salvaged from other motorcycles. He named the homemade motorcycle a Bilsson and raced it to win the 1962 500cc Luxembourg Grand Prix, finishing the season ranked fifth in the World Championship. His victory in Luxembourg marked the final victory of Nilsson's world championship career. Swedish riders claimed the first five positions as Sweden continued to dominate international motocross competitions. At the 1962 Motocross des Nations event in Wohlen, Switzerland, Nilsson finished second to Rolf Tibblin as the top individual points scorer as the Swedish team was victorious for the second consecutive year.

Nilsson scored two second-place results to start the 1963 season putting himself into contention however, he suffered an injury while competing in a Swedish championship race which forced him to miss the remainder of the World Championship. He campaigned an ESO motorcycle in the 1964 season, scoring three podium results including a second place behind eventual World Champion Jeff Smith at the 500cc Italian Grand Prix to finish the season ranked fifth in the championship.

Nilsson's 1965 season ended with an accident before the first race of the season in Austria. Nilsson and Rolf Tibblin were test riding motorcycles in their hotel parking lot when they collided in a blind corner. Neither of the riders were wearing their protective riding apparel and Tibblin lost the end of his little finger and received a concussion while Nilsson suffered a broken arm, an amputated toe and also received a concussion. His injuries forced him out of contention for the season.

In 1966, Nilsson returned to the 500cc World Championship racing a privateer Husqvarna and placed 15th in the final points standings. Nilsson competed in his final World Championship race at the 1967 500cc British Grand Prix at the age of 34.

== Motocross career overview ==
Nilsson won 21 individual heat races and 18 Grand Prix victories during his world championship racing career. Along with his two 500cc World Championships (1957, 1960), he won four 500cc Swedish Motocross Championships (1954, 1957, 1959, 1960). Nilsson was named a member of the Swedish Motocross des Nations team 13 times (1952–1962, 1964, 1966) and he took part in four Swedish Motocross des Nations victories (1955, 1958, 1961, 1962). He was the top individual points scorer at three Motocross des Nations events, (1954, 1958, 1961). Nilsson also competed in enduro events, including two victories in the grueling Novemberkåsan Enduro.

== Later career ==
After his competitive racing career, Nilsson continued to work for Husqvarna, helping to mentor riders such as Torsten Hallman and Bengt Åberg, both of whom went on to win motocross World Championships. He also traveled to the United States for Husqvarna in the early 1970s where he helped demonstrate new motorcycles. He eventually returned to speedway racing where he built the racing engines for four-time Speedway World Champion, Greg Hancock.

Nilsson had two sons who followed him into motorcycle racing. In 1980, his oldest son Dick Nilsson died from injuries sustained in a motocross accident in Belgium. His other son, Jeff Nilsson won three 125cc Swedish Motocross Championships as well as the 1991 125cc Enduro World Championship after a season long battle with the defending champion, Paul Edmondson.

== Motocross Grand Prix Results ==
Points system from 1952 to 1968:

Position	1st	2nd	3rd	4th	5th	6th
Points	8	6	4	3	2	1

Denotes European motocross championship only.

Year	Class	Machine	1		2		3		4		5		6		7		8		9		10		11		12		13		14		Pos	Pts
Year	Class	Machine	R1	R2	R1	R2	R1	R2	R1	R2	R1	R2	R1	R2	R1	R2	R1	R2	R1	R2	R1	R2	R1	R2	R1	R2	R1	R2	R1	R2	Pos	Pts
1952	500cc	Triumph	ITA -	ITA -	BEL; 8	BEL -	LUX -	LUX -	SWE -	SWE -	FRA -	FRA -	UK -	UK -																	-	0
1953	500cc	AJS	CH; 6	CH; 4	NED -	NED -	FRA -	FRA -	ITA -	ITA -	UK -	UK -	BEL -	BEL -	LUX -	LUX -	SWE -	SWE -													13th	3
1954	500cc	BSA	CH -	CH -	ITA -	ITA -	NED -	NED -	UK -	UK -	LUX -	LUX -	BEL -	BEL -	SWE; 1	SWE; 1	FRA -	FRA -													7th	8
1955	500cc	BSA	CH -	CH -	FRA; 1	FRA; 2	ITA; 1	ITA; 7	UK; 7	UK; 7	BEL -	BEL -	LUX -	LUX; 2	SWE; 1	SWE; 2	NED; 2	NED; 3													2nd	22
1956	500cc	BSA	CH; 3	CH -	NED -	NED -	ITA; 3	ITA; 1	FRA -	FRA -	UK -	UK -	BEL; 2	BEL; 9	LUX; 7	LUX -	SWE; 2	SWE; 1	DEN -	DEN -											5th	16
1957	500cc	Crescent-AJS	CH -	CH -	FRA; 4	FRA; 2	SWE; 1	SWE; 1	ITA; 3	ITA; 1	UK; 4	UK; 5	NED; 1	NED; 1	BEL -	BEL; 3	LUX -	LUX -	DEN; 4	DEN; 3											1st	34
1958	500cc	Crescent-AJS	AUT -	AUT; 2	DEN; 1	DEN; 1	CH; 2	CH; 2	FRA; 3	FRA; 5	ITA; 3	ITA; 3	UK; 3	UK -	NED -	NED -	BEL -	BEL; 3	LUX -	LUX; 2	SWE; 10	SWE -									2nd	34
1959	500cc	Crescent-AJS	AUT; 9	AUT; 1	CH; 1	CH; 4	DEN -	DEN -	FRA; 3	FRA; 2	ITA -	ITA -	GER; 8	GER; 1	UK; 9	UK -	NED -	NED -	BEL -	BEL; 1	LUX -	LUX; 15	SWE -	SWE; 1							2nd	36
1960	500cc	Husqvarna	AUT; 3	AUT; 2	FRA -	FRA -	SWE; 3	SWE; 1	ITA; 5	ITA; 1	GER -	GER -	UK; 1	UK; 1	NED; 1	NED; 2	BEL -	BEL; 1	LUX -	LUX; 13											1st	38
1961	500cc	Husqvarna	CH; 2	CH; 1	AUT -	AUT -	FRA; 2	FRA -	CZE; 1	CZE; 1	ITA; 1	ITA; 1	UK -	UK -	NED; 5	NED; 1	BEL -	BEL -	LUX; 1	LUX; 1	SWE; 1	SWE; 1	GER; 1	GER; 10							2nd	36
1962	500cc	Husqvarna	AUT; 2	AUT; 3	FRA; 3	FRA; 3	CH -	CH -	ITA; 7	ITA; 1	CZE -	CZE -	UK; 4	UK -	NED; 4	NED; 9	BEL; 5	BEL; 9	LUX -	LUX -	SWE -	SWE -									5th	23
1962	500cc	Bilsson	AUT -	AUT -	FRA -	FRA -	CH -	CH -	ITA -	ITA -	CZE -	CZE -	UK -	UK -	NED -	NED -	BEL -	BEL -	LUX; 1	LUX; 2	SWE; 8	SWE; 2									5th	23
1963	500cc	Bilsson	AUT; 2	AUT; 2	CH; 1	CH; 3	DEN; 10	DEN; 3	NED; 3	NED -	FRA; 4	FRA; 4	ITA -	ITA -	CZE -	CZE -	USR -	USR -	UK -	UK -	BEL -	BEL -	LUX -	LUX -	GDR -	GDR -					6th	17
1964	500cc	ESO	CH -	CH -	AUT -	AUT -	DEN -	DEN -	SWE; 7	SWE; 6	NED; 5	NED; 3	FRA -	FRA -	ITA; 4	ITA; 6	URS -	URS -	CZE; 4	CZE; 2	BEL; 6	BEL -	LUX; 2	LUX; 4	GER; 6	GER; 5	GDR -	GDR -	ESP -	ESP -	5th	20
1965	500cc	ESO	AUT -	AUT -	CH -	CH -	FRA -	FRA -	FIN -	FIN -	SWE -	SWE -	GDR -	GDR -	CZE -	CZE -	URS; 5	URS -	UK -	UK -	ITA -	ITA -	GER -	GER -	NED -	NED -	LUX -	LUX -			-	0
1965	500cc	Bilsson	AUT -	AUT -	CH -	CH -	FRA -	FRA -	FIN -	FIN -	SWE -	SWE -	GDR -	GDR -	CZE -	CZE -	URS -	URS -	UK -	UK -	ITA; 3	ITA -	GER -	GER -	NED -	NED -	LUX -	LUX -			-	0
1966	500cc	Husqvarna	CH -	CH -	AUT; 18	AUT; 12	ITA -	ITA -	DEN -	DEN -	SWE -	SWE; 5	FIN; 14	FIN -	GDR -	GDR -	CZE -	CZE -	URS -	URS -	UK -	UK; 9	NED -	NED -	BEL -	BEL -	LUX; 7	LUX; 3	GER; 4	GER; 7	15th	5
1967	500cc	Husqvarna	AUT; 2	AUT; 2	ITA -	ITA -	SWE -	SWE -	CZE -	CZE -	URS -	URS -	FRA -	FRA -	GER; 10	GER; 5	UK; 7	UK; 5	BEL -	BEL -	LUX -	LUX -	CH -	CH -							9th	9
