= 1953 Motocross European Championship =

Motocross championship season

Seasons
- ← 1952 1954 →

The 1953 Motocross European Championship was the 2nd edition of the Motocross European Championship organized by the FIM and reserved for 500cc motorcycles. Participants are split into two qualifying heat races. The top riders qualify for the Grand Prix which is contested in a single round. If the number of competitors is low, race organizers are allowed to cancel the qualifying heat races and all competitors take part in the Grand Prix race which is contested in a single round.

Since 1957 this championship has then become the current Motocross World Championship.

It should not be confused with the European Motocross Championship, now organized by the FIM Europe, whose first edition was held in 1988.

== Grands Prix ==
Round	Date	Grand Prix	Location	Winner	Team	Report
1	April 26	(Switzerland) Swiss Grand Prix	Geneva	(United Kingdom) Basil Hall	BSA	Report
2	May 14	(Netherlands) Dutch Grand Prix	Norg	(Belgium) Auguste Mingels	Matchless	Report
3	May 31	(France) French Grand Prix	Lyon	(Belgium) Auguste Mingels	Matchless	Report
4	June 14	(Italy) Italian Grand Prix	Imola	(Belgium) Auguste Mingels	Matchless	Report
5	July 5	(United Kingdom) British Grand Prix	Brands Hatch	(United Kingdom) Brian Stonebridge	Greeves	Report
6	August 2	(Belgium) Belgian Grand Prix	Namur	(Belgium) René Baeten	Saroléa	Report
7	August 8	Luxembourg Grand Prix	Ettelbruck	(United Kingdom) Les Archer Jr.	Norton	Report
8	August 30	(Sweden) Swedish Grand Prix	Saxtorp	(Belgium) René Baeten	Saroléa	Report

== Final standings ==
=== 500cc ===
Points are awarded to the top 6 classified finishers.

Position	1st	2nd	3rd	4th	5th	6th
Points	8	6	4	3	2	1

Pos	Rider	Machine	CH (Switzerland)	NED (Netherlands)	FRA (France)	ITA (Italy)	GBR (United Kingdom)	BEL (Belgium)	LUX (Luxembourg)	SWE (Sweden)	Pts
1	(Belgium) Auguste Mingels	Matchless/FN	2	1	1	1			2		30
2	(Belgium) René Baeten	Saroléa						1	4	1	19
3	(Belgium) Victor Leloup	FN	3	3	2	4		3	3		18
4	(United Kingdom) Basil Hall	BSA	1				2	6			15
5	(United Kingdom) Les Archer Jr.	Norton				3			1		12
6	(United Kingdom) Geoff Ward	AJS		4			3			3	11
7	(United Kingdom) Phil Nex	Saroléa				2			6	4	10
8	(Belgium) Nic Jansen	Saroléa						2	5		8
8	(United Kingdom) Brian Stonebridge	BSA					1				8
10	(Netherlands) Frans Baudoin	Matchless		2							6
10	(France) Henri Frantz	BSA	5		3						6
10	(Sweden) Kuno Johansson	BSA								2	6
13	(Belgium) Marcel Cox	Matchless		5		6					3
13	(Sweden) Bill Nilsson	AJS	4								3
13	(France) Gaston Prieur	FN			4						3
13	(United Kingdom) Don Rickman	BSA					4				3
13	(Belgium) André Van Heuverzwijn	Saroléa						4			3
18	(United Kingdom) John Avery	BSA								5	2
18	(United Kingdom) Eric Cheney	Norton				5					2
18	(Belgium) René Collee	BSA						5			2
18	(France) Carlo Molinari	BSA			5						2
18	(United Kingdom) Monty Banks	BSA					5				2
23	(France) Jacques Charrier	BSA			6						1
23	(Belgium) Albert Cordonnier	FN	6								1
23	(Sweden) Gunnar Johansson	BSA								6	1
23	(Netherlands) Albert Koning	AJS		6							1
23	(United Kingdom) Bob Manns	AJS					6				1
