= 1955 Motocross European Championship =

Motorcycle competition

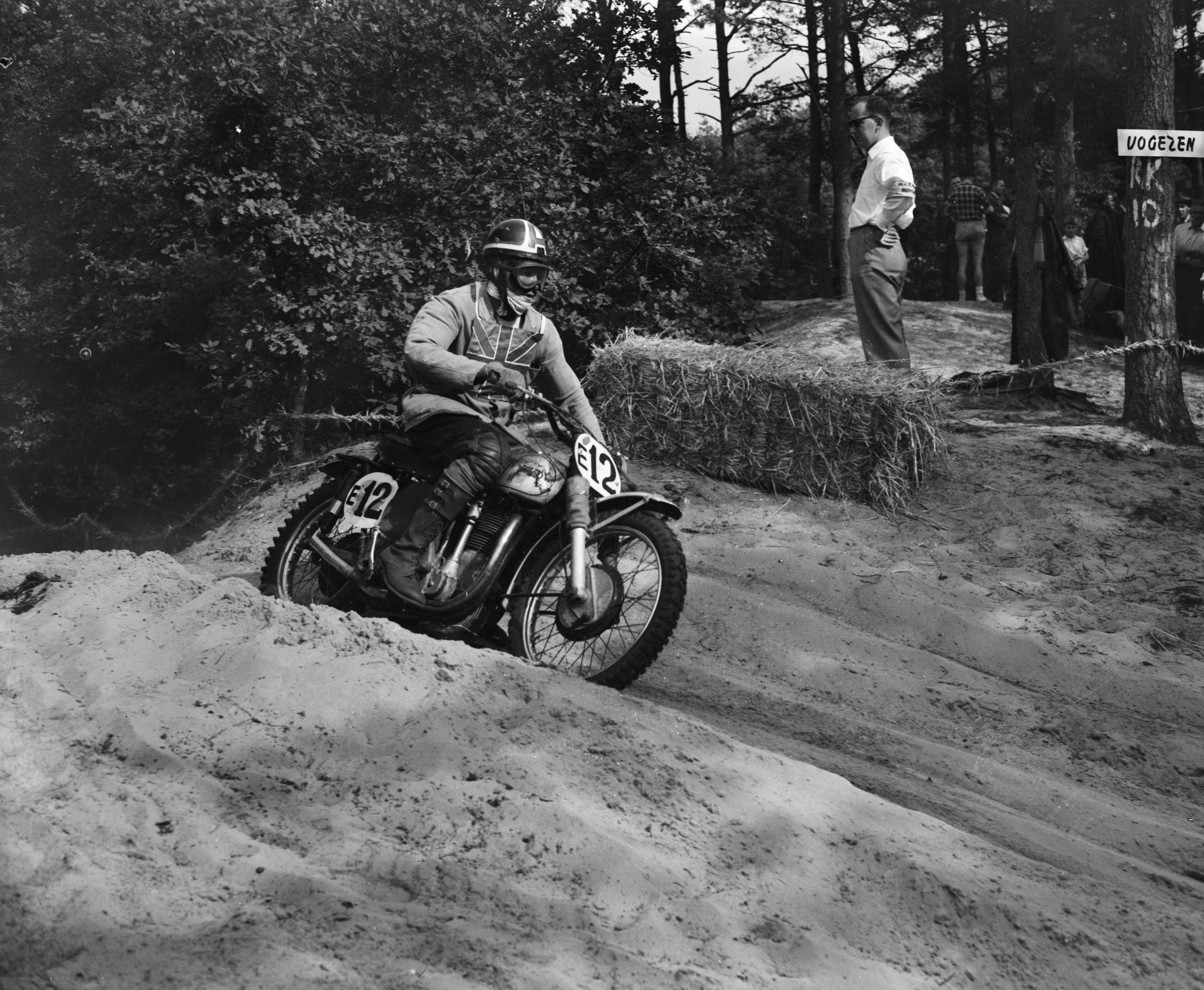
Les Archer during the Dutch GP, held in Norg on 4 September 1955.

The 1955 Motocross European Championship was the 4th edition of the Motocross European Championship organized by the FIM and reserved for 500cc motorcycles.

Since 1957 this championship has then become the current Motocross World Championship.

It should not be confused with the European Motocross Championship, now organized by the FIM Europe, whose first edition was held in 1988.

== Grands Prix ==
Round	Date	Grand Prix	Location	Winner	Team	Report
1	May 8	(Switzerland) Swiss Grand Prix	Geneva	(Belgium) Victor Leloup	FN	Report
2	May 22	(France) French Grand Prix	Vesoul	(United Kingdom) Les Archer Jr.	Norton	Report
3	June 5	(Italy) Italian Grand Prix	Imola	(Sweden) Sten Lundin	BSA	Report
4	July 4	(United Kingdom) British Grand Prix	Hawkstone Park	(United Kingdom) Jeff Smith	BSA	Report
5	August 8	(Belgium) Belgian Grand Prix	Namur	(United Kingdom) John Draper	BSA	Report
6	August 1	Luxembourg Grand Prix	Ettelbruck	(United Kingdom) Les Archer Jr.	Norton	Report
7	August 22	(Sweden) Swedish Grand Prix	Saxtorp	(United Kingdom) John Draper	BSA	Report
8	September 4	(Netherlands) Dutch Grand Prix	Norg	(Sweden) Sten Lundin	BSA	Report

== Final standings ==
Points are awarded to the top 6 classified finishers.

Position	1st	2nd	3rd	4th	5th	6th
Points	8	6	4	3	2	1

Pos	Rider	Machine	CH (Switzerland)	FRA (France)	ITA (Italy)	GBR (United Kingdom)	BEL (Belgium)	LUX (Luxembourg)	SWE (Sweden)	NED (Netherlands)	Pts
1	(United Kingdom) John Draper	BSA				2	1		1	6	23
2	(Sweden) Bill Nilsson	BSA		2				2	2	3	22
3	(Sweden) Sten Lundin	BSA		6	1		6	3		1	21
4	(Belgium) Victor Leloup	FN	1	3			2	4	6		21
5	(United Kingdom) Les Archer Jr.	Norton		1		4		1			19
6	(United Kingdom) Brian Stonebridge	BSA	4		2	3	4				16
7	(United Kingdom) Jeff Smith	BSA			5	1			3		14
8	(Belgium) Jean Somja	FN		4	3		3				11
9	(Belgium) René Baeten	Matchless	3	5						4	9
10	(Sweden) Lars Gustavsson	Monark						5	5	5	6
10	(France) René Klym	BSA	2								6
10	(Netherlands) Hendrik Rietman	FN								2	6
13	(Sweden) Eje Bergman	BSA							4		3
13	(Belgium) Nic Jansen	BSA			4						3
15	(United Kingdom) Geoff Ward	AJS	6			6					2
15	(United Kingdom) Basil Hall	BSA					5				2
15	(United Kingdom) David Tye	AJS				5					2
15	(Belgium) André Van Heuverzwijn	Saroléa	5								2
15	(United Kingdom) Phil Nex	Matchless			6			6			2
