= 1954 Motocross European Championship =

Motocross championship season

The 1954 Motocross European Championship was the 3rd edition of the Motocross European Championship organized by the FIM and reserved for 500cc motorcycles.

Since 1957 this championship has then become the current Motocross World Championship.

It should not be confused with the European Motocross Championship, now organized by the FIM Europe, whose first edition was held in 1988.

== Grands Prix ==
Round	Date	Grand Prix	Location	Winner	Team	Report
1	April 25	(Switzerland) Swiss Grand Prix	Geneva	(Belgium) Auguste Mingels	FN	Report
2	June 6	(Italy) Italian Grand Prix	Imola	(Belgium) Auguste Mingels	FN	Report
3	June 13	(Netherlands) Dutch Grand Prix	Markelo	(United Kingdom) Jeff Smith	BSA	Report
4	July 4	(United Kingdom) British Grand Prix	Hawkstone Park	(United Kingdom) Phil Nex	BSA	Report
5	August 1	Luxembourg Grand Prix	Ettelbruck	(Belgium) Auguste Mingels	FN	Report
6	August 8	(Belgium) Belgian Grand Prix	Namur	(Belgium) René Baeten	Saroléa	Report
7	August 22	(Sweden) Swedish Grand Prix	Saxtorp	(Sweden) Bill Nilsson	BSA	Report
8	September 12	(France) French Grand Prix	Montreuil	(Belgium) René Baeten	Saroléa	Report

== Final standings ==
Points are awarded to the top 6 classified finishers.

Position	1st	2nd	3rd	4th	5th	6th
Points	8	6	4	3	2	1

Pos	Rider	Machine	CH (Switzerland)	ITA (Italy)	NED (Netherlands)	GBR (United Kingdom)	LUX (Luxembourg)	BEL (Belgium)	SWE (Sweden)	FRA (France)	Pts
1	(Belgium) Auguste Mingels	Matchless/FN	1	1			1	4	2		30
2	(Belgium) René Baeten	Saroléa					2	1		1	22
3	(United Kingdom) Jeff Smith	BSA			1			2		2	20
4	(Belgium) Victor Leloup	FN	2	3	2		4	3		4	20
5	(United Kingdom) Phil Nex	BSA	5			1				6	11
6	(United Kingdom) Brian Stonebridge	BSA	3	2							10
7	(Sweden) Bill Nilsson	BSA							1		8
8	(Belgium) André Van Heuverzwijn	Saroléa			3					3	8
9	(United Kingdom) John Avery	BSA		4					3		7
10	(United Kingdom) Les Archer Jr.	Norton				4	3				7
11	(United Kingdom) David Curtis	Matchless				2					6
12	(Belgium) Nic Jansen	Saroléa	6			6		6		5	5
13	(United Kingdom) David Tye	BSA				3					4
14	(Sweden) Gunnar Johansson	BSA							4		3
14	(Netherlands) Piet Vanden Oeve	BSA			4						3
14	(United Kingdom) Basil Hall	BSA	4								3
15	(Sweden) Gosta Nilsson	BSA							5		2
15	(Belgium) Marcel Meunier	Saroléa		5							2
15	(Belgium) Jan Rombouts	Saroléa			5						2
15	(United Kingdom) Terry Cheshire	BSA				5					2
15	(United Kingdom) John Draper	BSA						5			2
15	(France) Carlo Molinari	Gilera					5				2
23	(United Kingdom) Harold Lines	Ariel		6							1
23	(Netherlands) Firmin Eeckhout	BSA			6						1
23	(Netherlands) Frans Baudoin	BSA							6		1
23	(Belgium) Jean Somja	FN					6				1
