= 1956 Motocross European Championship =

Motocross championship season

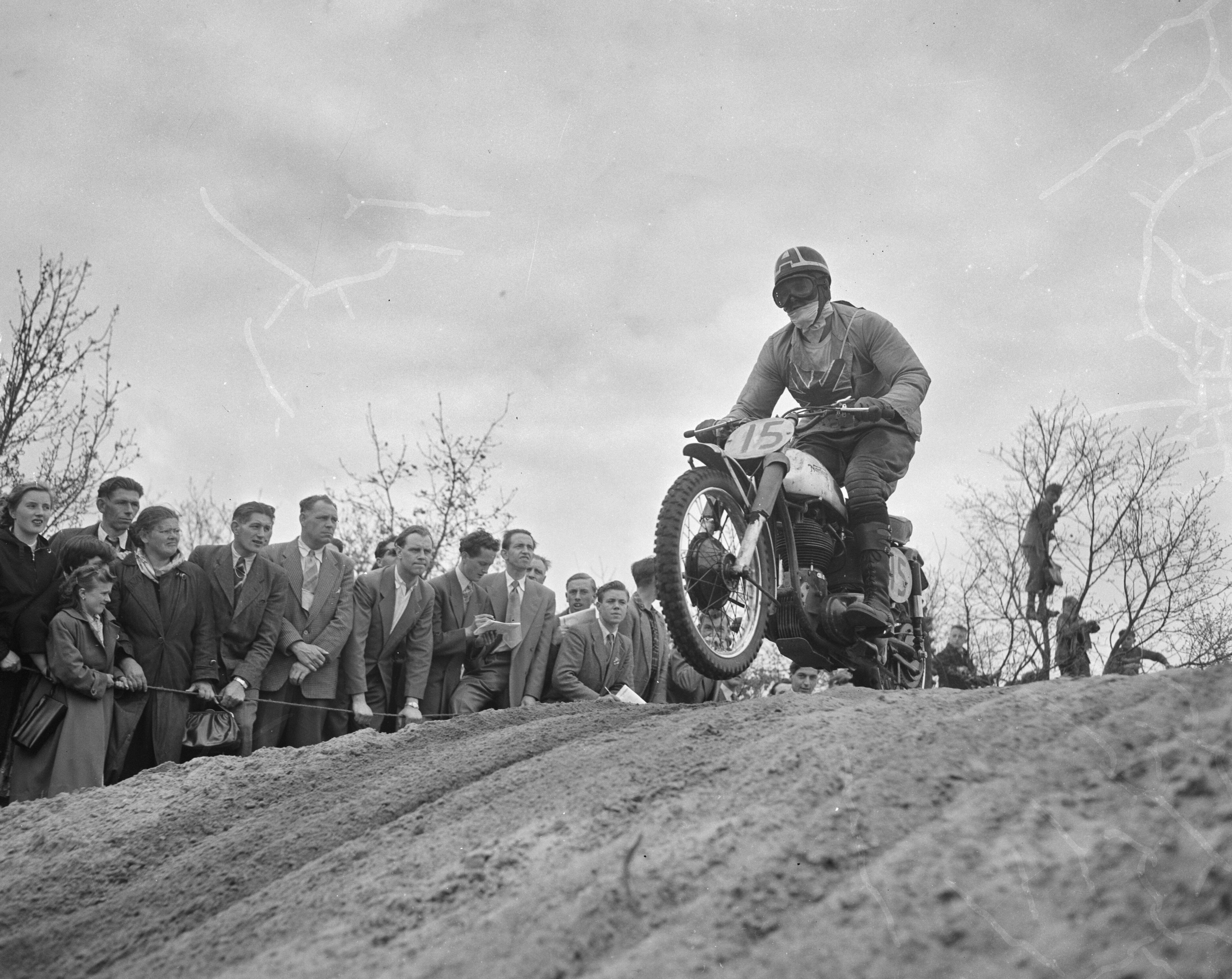
Les Archer during the Dutch GP, held in Schijndel on 4 May 1956.

The 1956 Motocross European Championship was the 5th edition of the Motocross European Championship organized by the FIM and reserved for 500cc motorcycles.

Since 1957 this championship has then become the current Motocross World Championship.

It should not be confused with the European Motocross Championship, now organized by the FIM Europe, whose first edition was held in 1988.

== Grands Prix ==
Round	Date	Grand Prix	Location	Winner	Team	Report
1	May 6	(Switzerland) Swiss Grand Prix	Geneva	(United Kingdom) Geoff Ward	BSA	Report
2	May 13	(Netherlands) Dutch Grand Prix	Schijndel	(Netherlands) Jan Clynk	BSA	Report
3	June 3	(Italy) Italian Grand Prix	Imola	(Sweden) Bill Nilsson	BSA	Report
4	June 10	(France) French Grand Prix	Rouen	(United Kingdom) Les Archer Jr.	Norton	Report
5	July 8	(United Kingdom) British Grand Prix	Hawkstone Park	(United Kingdom) Les Archer Jr.	Norton	Report
6	August 5	(Belgium) Belgian Grand Prix	Balen	(United Kingdom) Les Archer Jr.	Norton	Report
7	August 12	Luxembourg Grand Prix	Ettelbruck	(United Kingdom) John Draper	BSA	Report
8	August 19	(Sweden) Swedish Grand Prix	Saxtorp	(Sweden) Bill Nilsson	BSA	Report
9	September 2	(Denmark) Danish Grand Prix	Randers	(United Kingdom) Les Archer Jr.	Norton	Report

== Final standings ==
=== 500cc ===
Points are awarded to the top 6 classified finishers.

Position	1st	2nd	3rd	4th	5th	6th
Points	8	6	4	3	2	1

Pos	Rider	Machine	CH (Switzerland)	NED (Netherlands)	ITA (Italy)	FRA (France)	GBR (United Kingdom)	BEL (Belgium)	LUX (Luxembourg)	SWE (Sweden)	DEN (Denmark)	Pts
1	(United Kingdom) Les Archer Jr.	Norton				1	1	1	2	4	1	32
2	(United Kingdom) John Draper	BSA		2		5	2		1	3		26
3	(Belgium) Nic Jansen	Matchless			2	2	3			6	4	19
4	(Sweden) Sten Lundin	BSA	4		3	6		2	4		3	17
5	(Sweden) Bill Nilsson	BSA			1					1		16
6	(United Kingdom) Geoff Ward	BSA	1			3		3				16
7	(Belgium) Auguste Mingels	FN	2		5			4	5			13
8	(Belgium) René Baeten	FN		5	4						2	11
9	(United Kingdom) Brian Stonebridge	BSA	3				6		3			9
10	(Netherlands) Jan Clijnk	BSA		1								8
11	(United Kingdom) Jeff Smith	BSA						6		2		7
12	(Netherlands) Piet Vanden Oever	BSA		3								4
13	(Sweden) Lars Gustavsson	BSA					5			5		4
14	(Netherlands) Broer Dirkx	Matchless		4								3
14	(United Kingdom) David Curtis	Matchless				4						3
14	(United Kingdom) Terry Cheshire	BSA					4					3
17	(Belgium) Jean Somja	FN	5									2
17	(Netherlands) Pol Breesselers	Matchless						5				2
17	(Denmark) Ejvind Hansen	BSA									5	2
20	(Sweden) Raymond Sigvardsson	AJS	6									1
20	(Netherlands) Hendrik Rietman	BSA		6								1
20	(Belgium) Jean Rombauts	BSA			6							1
20	(Belgium) Hubert Scaillet	FN							6			1
20	(Netherlands) Frans Baudouin	Matchless									6	1
