= 1952 Motocross European Championship =

Motocross championship season

Seasons
- ← - 1953 →

The 1952 Motocross European Championship was the 1st edition of the Motocross European Championship organized by the FIM and reserved for 500cc motorcycles. Participants are split into two qualifying heat races. The top riders qualify for the Grand Prix which is contested in a single round. If the number of competitors is low, race organizers are allowed to cancel the qualifying heat races and all competitors take part in the Grand Prix race which is contested in a single round.

Since 1957 this championship has then become the current Motocross World Championship.

It should not be confused with the European Motocross Championship, now organized by the FIM Europe, whose first edition was held in 1988.

== Grands Prix ==
| Round | Date | Grand Prix | Location | Winner | Team | Report |
|---|---|---|---|---|---|---|
| 1 | June 1 | (Italy) Italian Grand Prix | Imola | (Belgium) Auguste Mingels | Matchless | Report |
| 2 | August 3 | (Belgium) Belgian Grand Prix | Namur | (Belgium) Victor Leloup | Saroléa | Report |
| 3 | August 10 | Luxembourg Grand Prix | Ettelbruck | (Belgium) Victor Leloup | Saroléa | Report |
| 4 | August 24 | (Sweden) Swedish Grand Prix | Saxtorp | (United Kingdom) John Avery | BSA | Report |
| 5 | September 7 | (France) French Grand Prix | Montreuil | (Belgium) Victor Leloup | Saroléa | Report |
| 6 | September 13 | (United Kingdom) British Grand Prix | Nympsfield | (United Kingdom) Brian Stonebridge | Greeves | Report |

== Final standings ==
Points are awarded to the top 6 classified finishers.

| Position | 1st | 2nd | 3rd | 4th | 5th | 6th |
| Points | 8 | 6 | 4 | 3 | 2 | 1 |

| Pos | Rider | Machine | ITA (Italy) | BEL (Belgium) | LUX (Luxembourg) | SWE (Sweden) | FRA (France) | GBR (United Kingdom) | Pts |
|---|---|---|---|---|---|---|---|---|---|
| 1 | (Belgium) Victor Leloup | Saroléa | 3 | 1 | 1 | 3 | 1 | 4 | 28 |
| 2 | (Belgium) Auguste Mingels | Matchless | 1 | 2 | 2 | | | | 20 |
| 3 | (United Kingdom) John Avery | BSA | | | | 1 | 3 | | 12 |
| 4 | (Belgium) Marcel Cox | Matchless | 2 | 5 | | | 4 | | 11 |
| 5 | (Belgium) Nic Jansen | Saroléa | | 3 | | | 2 | | 10 |
| 6 | (Belgium) André Van Heuverzwijn | Saroléa | 5 | 6 | 4 | 5 | | | 8 |
| 6 | (United Kingdom) Brian Stonebridge | BSA | | | | | | 1 | 8 |
| 8 | (Sweden) Hans Danielsson | BSA | | | 6 | 2 | | | 8 |
| 9 | (United Kingdom) Basil Hall | BSA | 4 | 4 | | | | | 6 |
| 9 | (United Kingdom) Phil Nex | BSA | | | | | | 2 | 6 |
| 11 | (Netherlands) Frans Baudoin | Matchless | 6 | | 5 | | 5 | | 5 |
| 12 | (Belgium) Marcel Meunier | FN | | | 3 | | | | 4 |
| 12 | (United Kingdom) Derek Rickman | BSA | | | | | | 3 | 4 |
| 14 | (Sweden) Fergus Andersson | Triumph | | | | 4 | | | 3 |
| 15 | (United States) Bud Ekins | Matchless | | | | | | 5 | 2 |
| 16 | (Sweden) Lennart Svensson | Triumph | | | | 6 | | | 1 |
| 16 | (United Kingdom) Harold Lines | Ariel | | | | | 6 | | 1 |
| 16 | (United Kingdom) Bill Barrugh | Dot | | | | | | 6 | 1 |
