= Jeff Smith (motorcyclist) =

English motorcycle racer (1934–2026)

Jeff Smith MBE
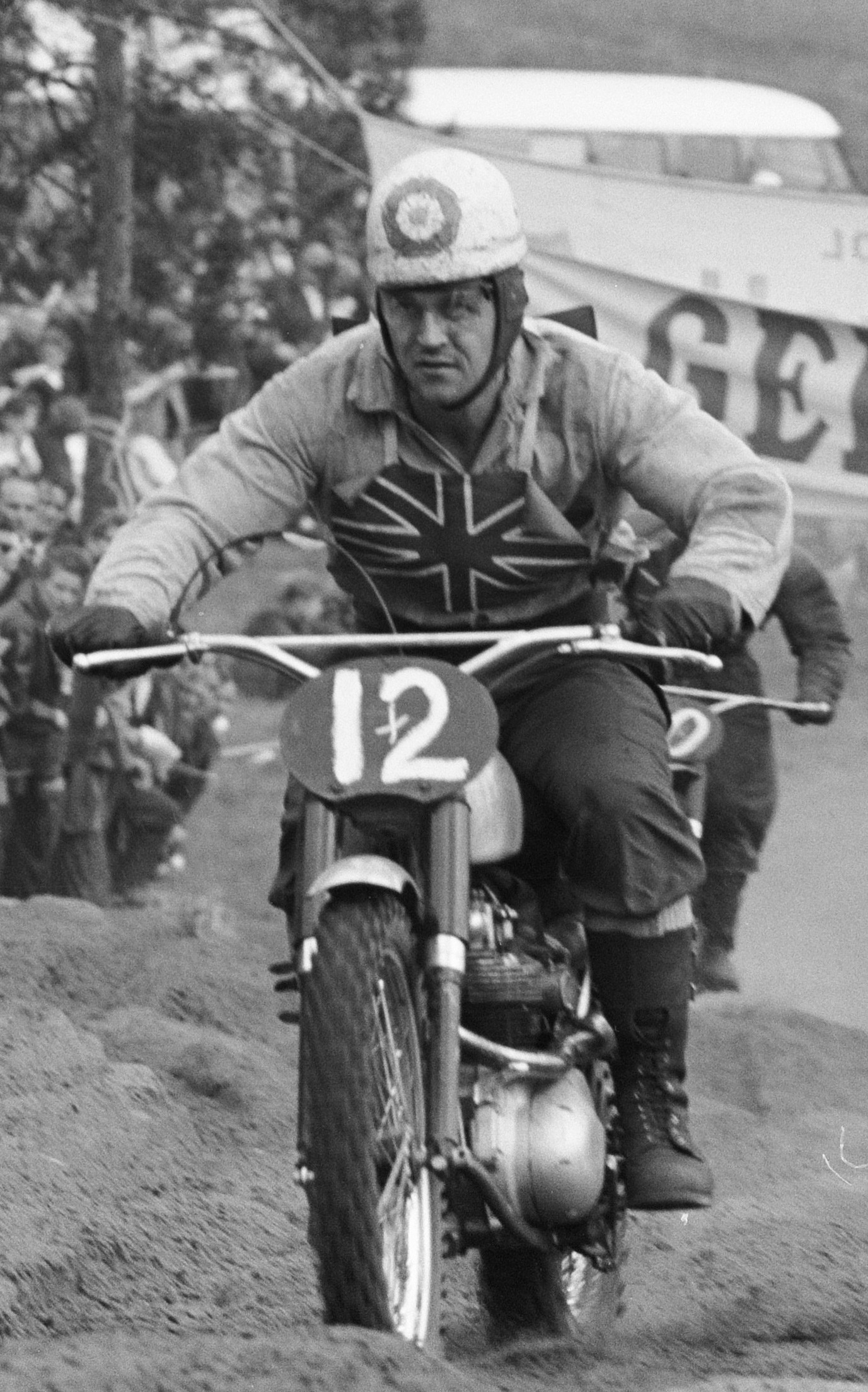
- Smith in 1962
- Nationality: English
- Born: 14 October 1934 Colne, Lancashire, England
- Died: 21 March 2026 (aged 91) Weston, Wisconsin, US

Motocross career
- Years active: 1954–1969
- Teams: BSA
- Championships: 500cc – 1964–1965
- Wins: 30

Jeffrey Vincent Smith (14 October 1934 – 21 March 2026) was an English professional motorcycle racer. He competed in the Motocross World Championships from 1954 to 1969 as a member of the BSA factory racing team.

Smith's achievements in motorcycle racing included two FIM 500cc Motocross World Championships (1964, 1965), two British Trials Championships, four individual race wins in the Motocross des Nations, one Scottish Six Days Trial win and eight ISDT Gold Medals. In 1970, Smith was appointed Member of the Order of the British Empire (MBE) and in 2000 he was inducted into the AMA Motorcycle Hall of Fame.

== Career ==
=== Early career ===
Smith was born in Colne, Lancashire, England, on 14 October 1934. His father was an avid motorcyclist and gave Smith his first motorcycle at the age of nine. He learned how to ride the motorcycle by riding around the field behind his home until it became dark. Smith began to ride in local trials competitions on a 125cc BSA Bantam motorcycle then progressed to riding his father's Norton trials motorcycle. He became such an accomplished competitor that he was offered a place on the Norton factory racing team where he earned his first ISDT Gold Medal in 1950 at the age of 16.

When Smith was hired by the BSA factory as a general engineering apprentice in 1952, BSA was the largest motorcycle manufacturer in the world. His first job at the BSA factory was to disassemble, clean and rebuild engines, which taught him excellent mechanical skills. He rode a BSA to win the 1953 and 1954 British Trials Championship.

=== Grand Prix racing ===
At the age of 19, Smith made an impressive debut to his international motocross career by winning his first race at the 1954 500cc Dutch Grand Prix. He finished the season ranked third in the 500cc European Motocross Championship behind the defending champion Auguste Mingels (FN) and Vice-Champion René Baeten (Saroléa).

The following year, Smith won the 1955 Scottish Six Days Trial as well as the British round of the 1955 500cc European Motocross Championship. He ended the season ranked seventh in the European championship, as his BSA teammate John Draper claimed the title. Smith would later become Draper's brother-in-law when he married his sister Irene Draper, who was an avid motorcyclist herself. He also won his first 500cc British Motocross Championship and was the top individual points scorer at the 1955 Motocross des Nations event held in Randers, Denmark. He won his second consecutive 500cc British Motocross Championship in 1956 and led the British team to a victory as the top individual points scorer at the 1956 Motocross des Nations event held in Namur, Belgium.

The FIM upgraded the 500cc European Motocross Championship to World Championship status for the 1957 season. Smith won his second 500cc British Motocross Grand Prix in 1957 at Hawkstone Park and ended the inaugural 500cc World Championship in fourth-place. For the third consecutive year, he was the top individual points scorer as he led the British team to a victory at the 1957 Motocross des Nations event held in Brands Hatch, England.

Smith won the 500cc British Motocross Grand Prix for a third time in 1959 and was a member of the victorious British team at 1959 Motocross des Nations event held in Namur, Belgium.

In 1960 Smith rode a four-stroke BSA C15 to compete in the 250cc European Motocross Championship, winning the Luxembourg and British Grand Prix races to finish the season ranked second to Dave Bickers (Greeves). He also won the 1960 500cc British Motocross Championship, starting a streak of six consecutive British championships (1960–1965). He was a member of his fourth victorious British Motocross des Nations team at the 1960 event held in Cassel, France.

Smith won another two Grand Prix events in the 1961 250cc European Motocross Championship, but dropped to third in the season final standings behind his BSA teammate Arthur Lampkin as Dave Bickers successfully defended his title. He was a member of the winning British team at the inaugural Trophée des Nations event for 250cc motorcycles in 1961.

The FIM upgraded the European Motocross Championship to World Championship status for the 1962 season. The Greeves factory chose not to compete in the new championship, keeping two-time European motocross champion, Dave Bickers, at home to compete in the British championship. Smith won three Grands Prix to take the championship points lead at mid-season, but then newcomer Torsten Hallman (Husqvarna) won five of the last six Grand Prix races to overtake Smith and claim his first world championship. Smith helped the Brirish team win their second consecutive Trophée des Nations event in 1962.

In 1962, the BSA factory began development on motorcycle to compete for the 500cc Motocross World Championship. A 343cc BSA B40 four-stroke engine was employed using the race-developed chassis of the BSA B15 model. After the engine was painted black, the new motorcycle was dubbed "Black Bess" by British motorsports journalists after the horse ridden by Highwayman, Dick Turpin. In a year that had been dominated by Swedish riders, Smith rode the new motorcycle to victory at the season-ending 1962 500cc Swedish Grand Prix ahead of Sten Lundin (Lito).

Smith entered the new motorcycle in the 1963 500cc Motocross World Championship and won three Grand Prix races to finish the season in third place just two points behind Second place Sten Lundin as Rolf Tibblin successfully defended his title by riding a four-stroke Husqvarna motorcycle to five Grand Prix victories.

A significant moment in motocross history occurred during the 1963 season when ČZ factory rider Vlastimil Válek rode a 263cc two-stroke engine powered motorcycle to win the first moto of the 500cc Czechoslovak Motocross Grand Prix ahead of a field of top-class, four stroke motorcycles. The victory marked a turning point in motocross history as, it was the first win by a two-stroke powered motorcycle in the premier division of the Motocross World Championships.

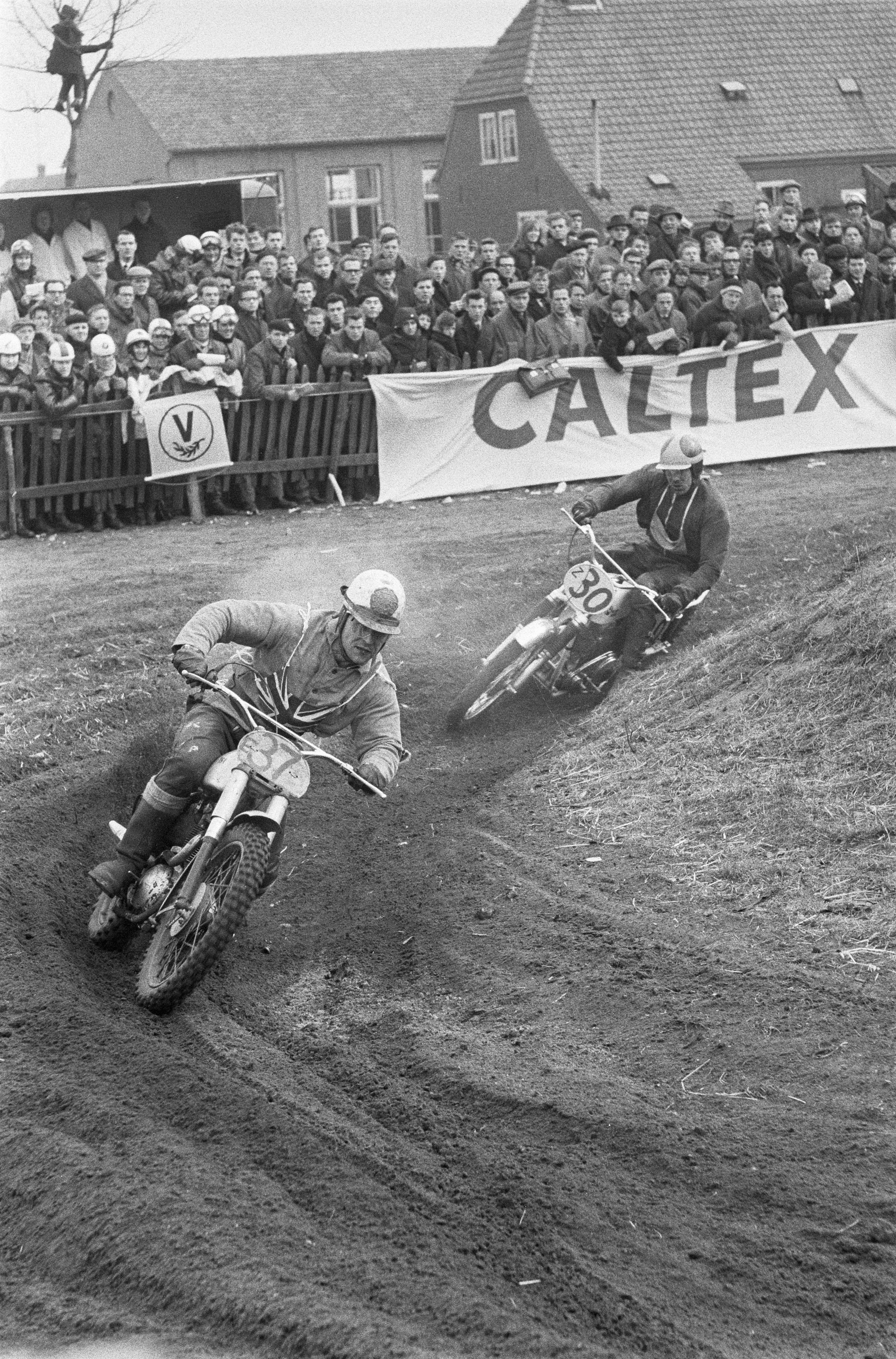
Smith (#37) leads Rolf Tibblin (#30) during an international race in Sint Anthonis, Netherlands in 1964

=== World Champion ===
Smith was meticulous in preparing his own machinery and, his efforts showed during the 1964 500cc Motocross World Championship when he completed the entire season without a mechanical failure. The defending champion, Rolf Tibblin, began the season strongly by winning five of the first six races of the season, but the 30-year-old Smith consistently scored points throughout the season and only once finished below third place. The championship wasn't decided until the final race of the season in Spain, where Smith took the victory to claim the World Championship by only two points over Tibblin. Smith was the top individual points scorer at the 1964 Motocross des Nations event leading the British team to victory. His accomplishments earned him the Motorcycle News 1964 'Man of the Year' award.

By the mid 1960s, the heavier four-stroke motorcycles were being rendered obsolete by advances in two-stroke engine technology which made apparent the importance of lightness and agility in motocross racing. Smith successfully defended his crown in the 1965 500cc World Championship with six Grand Prix victories however, his victory would mark the last time that a motorcycle powered by a four-stroke engine would win a 500cc Motocross World Championship. Paul Friedrichs riding a two-stroke ČZ motorcycle won three Grand Prix races and finished second to Smith in the championship.

=== Later career ===
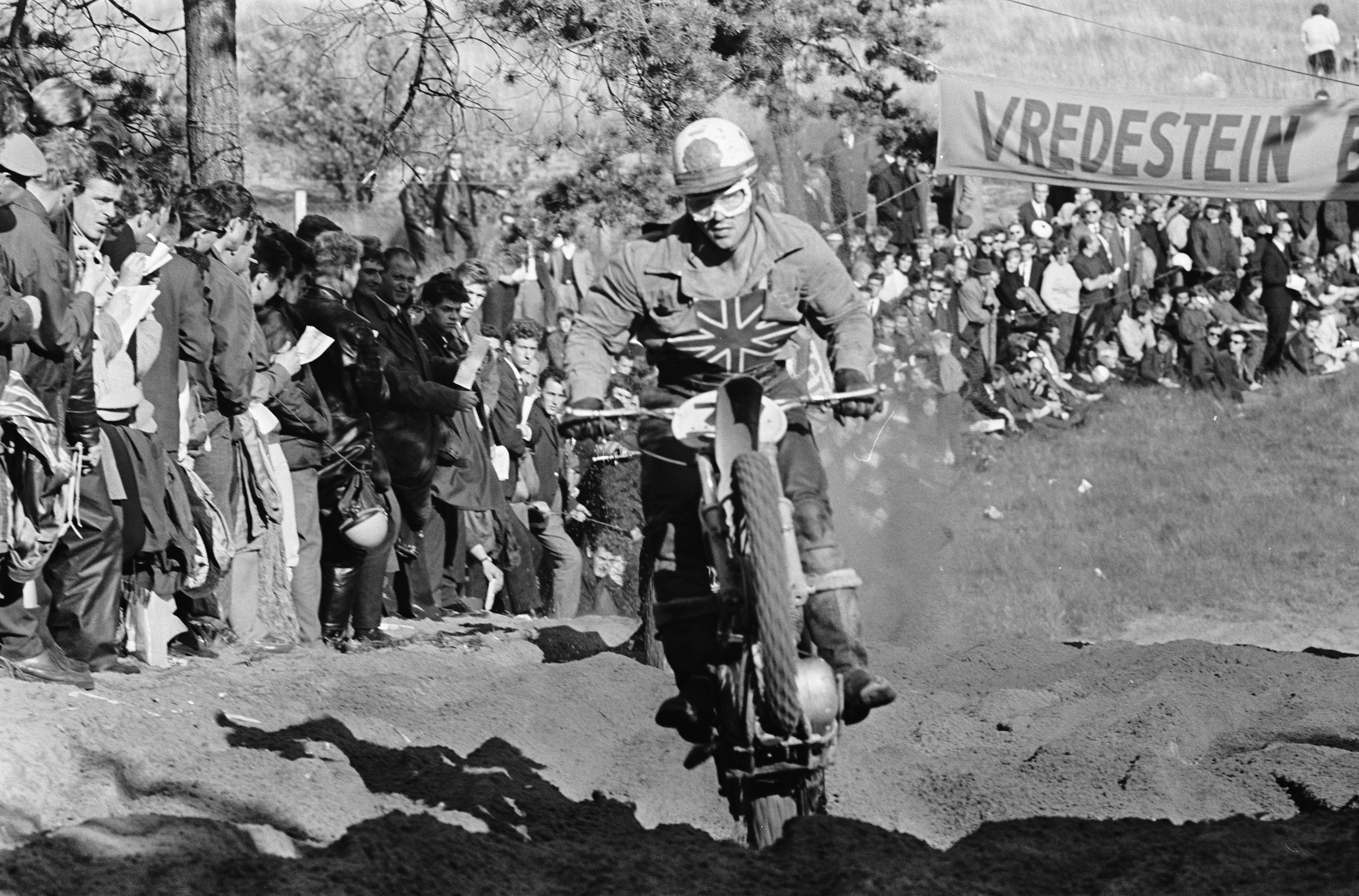
Smith in action at the 500cc Dutch Grand Prix on 25 July 1965 in Bergharen, Holland.

In an effort to keep pace with the rapid developments in two-stroke engine technology, the BSA factory racing team constructed a new BSA Victor motorcycle for the 1966 season which utilised a four-stroke engine cradled in an ultra-lightweight, titanium motorcycle frame. Unfortunately, the titanium frame was too brittle for the rigors of motocross racing and broke regularly during competitions. Smith won the 1966 500cc Finnish Grand Prix but dropped to third in the 500cc season final points standings behind ČZ factory teammates Paul Friedrichs and Rolf Tibblin.

Friedrichs dominated the 1966 season by winning seven out of fourteen Grand Prix events, marking the first time a motorcycle powered by a two-stroke engine had won the premier 500cc division since the inception of the Motocross World Championships in 1957. The 1966 season marked the end of the first four-stroke era in motocross competition. Two-stroke engines would dominate off-road motorcycle racing until 2003 when, in the face of mounting government environmental regulations, the FIM implemented new rules favouring environmentally friendlier four-stroke engines.

Smith won the final Grand Prix of his career at the 1967 Russian GP and improved to second place in the 1967 championship, however Friedrichs continued to dominate the 500cc class by winning seven out of eleven Grand Prix events. He won the 500cc British Motocross Championship for the ninth and final time in 1967.

By 1968, the BSA factory was the last remaining manufacturer to compete with four-stroke engines as two-stroke motorcycles began to dominate the sport. At the age of thirty-five, Smith made his final World Championship appearance at the iconic Namur circuit for the 1969 500cc Belgian Grand Prix.

Smith participated in the 1970 Trans-AMA motocross series in the United States. The Trans-AMA was the first professional motocross series sanctioned by the American Motorcyclist Association (AMA) as a pilot event to help establish motocross in the United States. Smith won the first round in La Rue, Ohio to become the first rider in history to win an AMA-sanctioned professional motocross event. He also won the second round in New Berlin, New York (Unadilla) and finished the series in third place behind his BSA teammates Dave Nicoll and John Banks. In the middle of the 1971 season, the BSA factory announced that they were ceasing operations after years of financial problems. At the age of 37, Smith announced his retirement in January 1972.

== Career overview ==
Smith won 53 individual heat races and 30 Grand Prix victories during his world championship racing career. He won two 500cc motocross world titles (1964, 1965) and nine 500cc British Motocross Championships (1955, 1956, 1960–1965, 1967). He also won two British Trials Championships, one Scottish Six Days Trial win and eight ISDT Gold Medals.

Smith was a member of seven victorious British Motocross des Nations teams (1956, 1957, 1959, 1960, 1964, 1965, 1967), and two victorious British Trophée des Nations teams (1961, 1962). Smith was the top individual points scorer at four Motocross des Nations events (1955, 1956, 1957, 1964).

== After racing ==
After Smith stopped racing professionally, he was hired by the Bombardier Corporation (manufacturer of Ski-Doo snowmobiles), as a special projects manager to oversee the development of off-road motorcycles for their recently formed Can-Am motorcycle division based in Valcourt, Quebec, Canada. He continued to compete in enduro events in his role as a Can-Am development rider, winning three more ISDT Gold Medals. Smith's development work helped the Can-Am racing team claim the first three places in the 1974 AMA 250cc motocross national championship.

In the wake of the 1973 oil crisis, sales of recreational vehicles decreased significantly and Bombardier was forced to reduce their snowmobile and motorcycle production. As a result, investments in product development were reduced substantially, and Can-Am was unable to keep pace with Japanese manufacturers as motocross technology began to develop rapidly during the 1970s and 1980s. Bombardier then shifted its priority from recreational products towards the transit equipment industry and then, several years later, into aircraft manufacturing. When Bombardier management made the decision to discontinue motorcycle production, Smith persuaded them to allow him to negotiate a contract with Armstrong-CCM Motorcycles to take over production. In 1983, Bombardier licensed the brand and outsourced development and production of the Can-Am motorcycles to Armstrong-CCM of Lancashire, England. 1987 was the final year Can-Am motorcycles were produced.

Smith spent his retirement years living in Wausau, Wisconsin where he served as an AMA director and treasurer, and was involved in vintage motorcycle racing as an executive director and assistant treasurer of the American Historic Racing Motorcycle Association (AHRMA). Smith led the AHRMA with the same hard-nosed attitude he had adopted as a racer, and this approach proved contentious among his peers, including the owner of Team Obsolete, Rob Iannucci. A series of disputes over Smith's leadership of the organisation led Iannucci to file a lawsuit against Smith and the AHRMA on 12 March 2001. The legal expenses in fighting the lawsuit forced the AHMRA to file for bankruptcy in November 2006. Smith resigned from the AMA on 15 February 2008, followed by his resignation from the AHRMA, as a result of irregular expense-account claims submitted by the then AMA chairman.

== Death ==
After a brief illness, Smith died at the Marshfield Clinic in Weston, Wisconsin on 21 March 2026, at the age of 91.

== Awards and honours ==
In 1964, Smith was the recipient of the Motor Cycle News 'Man of the Year' award. In the 1970 New Year Honours, Smith was appointed Member of the Order of the British Empire (MBE) for services to off-road motorcycle sport. He was inducted into the AMA Motorcycle Hall of Fame in 2000.

== Motocross Grand Prix results ==
Points system from 1952 to 1968:

| Position | 1st | 2nd | 3rd | 4th | 5th | 6th |
|---|---|---|---|---|---|---|
| Points | 8 | 6 | 4 | 3 | 2 | 1 |

Points system from 1969 to 1980:

| Position | 1 | 2 | 3 | 4 | 5 | 6 | 7 | 8 | 9 | 10 |
|---|---|---|---|---|---|---|---|---|---|---|
| Points | 15 | 12 | 10 | 8 | 6 | 5 | 4 | 3 | 2 | 1 |

| Denotes European motocross championship only. |

| Year | Class | Machine | 1 | | 2 | | 3 | | 4 | | 5 | | 6 | | 7 | | 8 | | 9 | | 10 | | 11 | | 12 | | 13 | | 14 | | 15 | | Pos | Pts |
| Year | Class | Machine | R1 | R2 | R1 | R2 | R1 | R2 | R1 | R2 | R1 | R2 | R1 | R2 | R1 | R2 | R1 | R2 | R1 | R2 | R1 | R2 | R1 | R2 | R1 | R2 | R1 | R2 | R1 | R2 | R1 | R2 | Pos | Pts |
|---|---|---|---|---|---|---|---|---|---|---|---|---|---|---|---|---|---|---|---|---|---|---|---|---|---|---|---|---|---|---|---|---|---|---|
| 1954 | 500cc | BSA | CH - | CH - | ITA - | ITA - | NED; 6 | NED; 1 | UK - | UK - | LUX - | LUX - | BEL - | BEL; 2 | SWE; 5 | SWE - | FRA; 1 | FRA; 2 | | | | | | | | | | | | | | | 3rd | 20 |
| 1955 | 500cc | BSA | CH - | CH - | FRA; 2 | FRA; 7 | ITA; 2 | ITA; 5 | UK; 1 | UK; 1 | BEL - | BEL; 9 | LUX - | LUX - | SWE; 2 | SWE; 3 | NED - | NED - | | | | | | | | | | | | | | | 7th | 14 |
| 1956 | 500cc | BSA | CH - | CH - | NED - | NED - | ITA - | ITA - | FRA; 5 | FRA - | UK; 21 | UK; 2 | BEL; 1 | BEL; 6 | LUX - | LUX - | SWE; 1 | SWE; 2 | DEN; 2 | DEN; 9 | | | | | | | | | | | | | 11th | 7 |
| 1957 | 500cc | BSA | CH - | CH - | FRA - | FRA - | SWE; 1 | SWE; 3 | ITA; 1 | ITA; 2 | UK; 1 | UK; 1 | NED; 2 | NED; 5 | BEL - | BEL; 4 | LUX - | LUX - | DEN; 3 | DEN; 8 | | | | | | | | | | | | | 4th | 23 |
| 1958 | 500cc | BSA | AUT - | AUT - | DEN; 4 | DEN; 4- | CH; 1 | CH; 7 | FRA; 1 | FRA; 3 | ITA; 3 | ITA; 4 | UK - | UK; 3 | NED; 9 | NED; 4 | BEL - | BEL; 5 | LUX - | LUX; 4 | SWE; 2 | SWE; 4 | | | | | | | | | | | 6th | 18 |
| 1959 | 250cc | BSA | AUT - | AUT - | CH - | CH - | BEL - | BEL - | GDR - | GDR - | TCH - | TCH - | POL - | POL - | GER - | GER - | ITA - | ITA - | FRA - | FRA - | NED - | NED - | UK; 6 | UK; 2 | LUX - | LUX - | SWE - | SWE - | | | | | 13th | 6 |
| 1959 | 500cc | BSA | AUT - | AUT - | CH; 19 | CH; 1 | DEN - | DEN - | FRA; 7 | FRA; 4 | ITA; 7 | ITA; 8 | GER; 6 | GER; 7 | UK; 1 | UK; 2 | NED; 4 | NED; 7 | BEL - | BEL; 6 | LUX - | LUX; 2 | SWE - | SWE - | | | | | | | | | 6th | 21 |
| 1960 | 250cc | BSA | CH - | CH - | BEL; 4 | BEL; 3 | FRA - | FRA - | TCH; 5 | TCH; 1 | POL; 2 | POL - | ITA; 2 | ITA; 6 | GDR - | GDR - | FIN - | FIN - | LUX; 1 | LUX; 2 | UK; 1 | UK; 2 | SWE; 2 | SWE; 3 | GER - | GER - | | | | | | | 2nd | 35 |
| 1960 | 500cc | BSA | AUT - | AUT - | FRA - | FRA - | SWE - | SWE - | ITA - | ITA - | GER - | GER - | UK; 8 | UK; 2 | NED - | NED - | BEL - | BEL - | LUX - | LUX - | | | | | | | | | | | | | 15th | 2 |
| 1961 | 250cc | BSA | BEL - | BEL - | FRA; 3 | FRA; 2 | NED; 1 | NED; 1 | TCH; 3 | TCH; 1 | POL; 2 | POL; 6 | LUX; 1 | LUX; 3 | FIN; 3 | FIN; 4 | ITA; 1 | ITA; 3 | GER; 4 | GER; 3 | UK - | UK - | CH; 3 | CH; 3 | SWE; 11 | SWE - | GDR - | GDR - | | | | | 3rd | 40 |
| 1961 | 500cc | BSA | CH - | CH - | AUT - | AUT - | FRA - | FRA - | TCH - | TCH - | ITA; 4 | ITA; 5 | UK - | UK - | NED; 3 | NED - | BEL - | BEL; 3 | LUX - | LUX - | SWE - | SWE - | GER - | GER - | | | | | | | | | 12th | 6 |
| 1962 | 250cc | BSA | ESP; 10 | ESP; 1 | CH; 2 | CH; 1 | BEL; 18 | BEL; 2 | FRA; 2 | FRA; 1 | TCH; 3 | TCH; 2 | POL; 1 | POL; 1 | NED; 1 | NED; 1 | LUX; 3 | LUX - | FIN; 5 | FIN; 1 | USR; 2 | USR; 2 | GER; 2 | GER; 2 | ITA; 2 | ITA; 2 | UK; 8 | UK; 3 | SWE; 11 | SWE; 3 | GDR; 3 | GDR; 4 | 2nd | 48 |
| 1962 | 500cc | BSA | AUT - | AUT - | FRA - | FRA - | CH - | CH - | ITA - | ITA - | TCH - | TCH - | UK - | UK - | NED - | NED - | BEL; 4 | BEL - | LUX; 7 | LUX; 1 | SWE; 1 | SWE; 3 | | | | | | | | | | | 7th | 9 |
| 1963 | 500cc | BSA | AUT; 8 | AUT; 6 | CH; 4 | CH; 2 | DEN; 1 | DEN; 1 | NED; 1 | NED; 2 | FRA; 3 | FRA; 2 | ITA; NC | ITA; NC | TCH; 9 | TCH; 4 | USR; 5 | USR; 4 | UK; 1 | UK; 2 | BEL; 3 | BEL; 3 | LUX; 6 | LUX; 4 | GDR; 1 | GDR; 1 | | | | | | | 3rd | 44 |
| 1964 | 500cc | BSA | CH; 2 | CH; 1 | AUT; 2 | AUT; 2 | DEN; 1 | DEN; 2 | SWE; 3 | SWE; 2 | NED; 1 | NED; 1 | FRA; 5 | FRA; 2 | ITA; 1 | ITA; 2 | URS; 1 | URS; 3 | TCH; 2 | TCH; 3 | BEL; 1 | BEL; 2 | LUX; 1 | LUX; 1 | GER; 2 | GER; 3 | GDR; 2 | GDR; 1 | ESP; 1 | ESP; 2 | | | 1st | 56 |
| 1965 | 500cc | BSA | AUT - | AUT - | CH; 1 | CH; 2 | FRA; 1 | FRA; 1 | FIN; 1 | FIN; 1 | SWE; 1 | SWE; 1 | GDR; 4 | GDR; 4 | TCH - | TCH - | URS; 2 | URS; 2 | UK; 1 | UK; 2 | ITA - | ITA - | GER; 3 | GER - | NED; 1 | NED; 3 | LUX; 3 | LUX - | | | | | 1st | 54 |
| 1966 | 500cc | BSA | CH - | CH; 8 | AUT; 5 | AUT; 7 | ITA; 2 | ITA; 2 | DEN - | DEN; 1 | SWE; 18 | SWE; 1 | FIN; 2 | FIN; 1 | GDR; 2 | GDR; 5 | TCH; 4 | TCH; 4 | URS; 3 | URS; 2 | UK; 2 | UK; 1 | NED; 5 | NED - | BEL - | BEL - | LUX - | LUX - | GER - | GER - | | | 3rd | 34 |
| 1967 | 500cc | BSA | AUT; 3 | AUT; 24 | ITA - | ITA - | SWE; 5 | SWE; 1 | TCH; 3 | TCH; 2 | USR; 2 | USR; 1 | FRA; 6 | FRA; 3 | GER; 3 | GER; 4 | UK; 4 | UK; 3 | BEL; 5 | BEL; 3 | LUX; 8 | LUX - | CH; 16 | CH; 6 | | | | | | | | | 2nd | 35 |
| 1968 | 500cc | BSA | AUT; 25 | AUT - | ITA - | ITA - | SWE - | SWE - | FIN; 3 | FIN; 3 | GDR; 10 | GDR; 10 | TCH; 6 | TCH - | UK; 6 | UK; 10 | GER - | GER - | FRA; 6 | FRA; 5 | NED; 5 | NED; 5 | BEL; 5 | BEL; 6 | LUX - | LUX - | CH; 5 | CH; 3 | | | | | 8th | 16 |
| 1969 | 500cc | BSA | AUT - | AUT - | SWE - | SWE - | NED - | NED - | ITA - | ITA - | TCH - | TCH - | USR - | USR - | GER - | GER - | BEL; 6 | BEL; 7 | LUX - | LUX - | FRA - | FRA - | CH - | CH - | GDR - | GDR - | | | | | | | 26th | 5 |
