= Auguste Mingels =

Belgian motorcycle racer

- Nationality: Belgian
- Born: 24 March 1921 Liège, Belgium
- Died: 20 May 1973 (aged 52) Liège, Belgium

Motocross career
- Years active: 1947 - 1957
- Teams: FN
- Championships: European 500cc – 1953, 1954
- Wins: 8

Auguste Mingels (24 March 1921 – 20 May 1973) was a Belgian professional motocross racer. He competed in the Motocross World Championships from 1947 to 1957. Mingels is notable for winning two consecutive F.I.M. 500cc European motocross championships in 1953 and 1954. Les Archer, who won the 1956 European motocross championship, considered Mingels to be one of the best European motocross riders of his era.

== Motorcycling career ==
Mingels was born in Liège, Belgium and began racing motorcycles in 1947. His portly physique earned him the affectionate nickname of "Le Gros". In 1952, the FIM inaugurated the European Motocross Championships for motorcycles using a 500cc engine displacement formula. The European championship was considered to be the world championship at the time, as the sport of motocross had yet to develop outside of Europe. Mingels rode a Saroléa and finished second in the European championship behind Victor Leloup. The following year, he competed aboard an FN motorcycle and won three Grand Prix races to clinch the 1953 European Motocross Championship. He successfully defended his title by winning the 1954 European Motocross Championship. Mingels dropped to seventh place in the 1956 championship. In 1957, the FIM upgraded the series to world championship status and the 36-year-old Mingels would finish the season in sixth place aboard a Saroléa.

Mingels competed for the Belgian team in the 1947, 1952 and 1953 Motocross des Nations events. He was the fastest individual rider at the 1947 Motocross des Nations event however, and the Belgian team finished in third place. He also won four Belgian motocross national championships during his motorcycling career. He was the boyhood hero to six-time motocross world champion Joël Robert.
