= Novemberkåsan =

Coordinates: 60°42′24″N 17°04′29″E

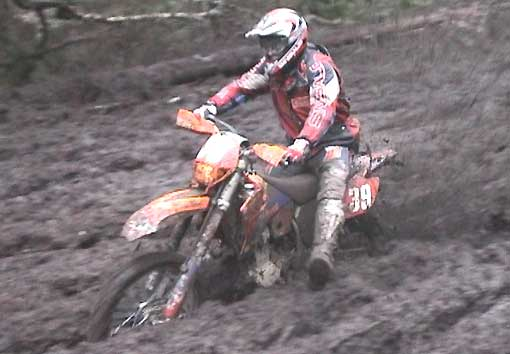
- Carl-Johan Bjerkert during the 2003 edition
- Status: active
- Genre: motorsporting event
- Date: November
- Frequency: annual
- Country: Sweden
- Inaugurated: 1915
- Organiser: Svenska Motorklubben

Novemberkåsan is one of Sweden's oldest and biggest motorcycle events. It has been held since 1915.

Throughout the years the contest has evolved to extreme enduro character, the competition includes both day and night stages which are driven in terrain and paths. In the early 1930s the total competition was about 600–700 kilometres (370–430 mi). Today the event is about 300 kilometres (190 miles).

The trophy is given to the driver who has won the competition three times.
