= John Draper (motorcyclist) =

- Nationality: English
- Born: 1929 Bishop's Cleeve, Gloucestershire, England
- Died: 24 December 2002 (aged 73) Bishop's Cleeve, Gloucestershire, England

Motocross career
- Years active: 1948 - 1961
- Teams: BSA
- Championships: European 500cc – 1955
- Wins: 5

John Draper (1929 – 24 December 2002) was an English professional motorcycle racer. He was a versatile rider competing in many diverse motorcycle competitions, most notably motocross in which he became the first British rider to win the European Motocross Championship in 1955. Draper also competed in trials, enduro and road racing competitions. He was a member of seven victorious British Motocross des Nations teams.

== Motorcycling career ==
Born in Bishop's Cleeve, Gloucestershire, England, Draper first learned to ride motorcycles on his father's farm. At the age of 17, his riding talent earned the attention of local motorcycling star Bob Foster who helped him obtain a 350cc AJS in 1946. In 1948, he signed a contract to ride for the BSA factory racing team joining his teammate and brother-in-law, Jeff Smith.

In 1950, Draper led a British team to victory in the Motocross des Nations event in Sweden, which was considered the Olympics of motorcycling. He demonstrated his riding versatility with a victory at the 1951 Scottish Six Days Trial. A few weeks later, he competed in the 1951 Isle of Man TT 350cc and 500cc Clubman's races for amateurs and posted two third-place finishes. Draper's impressive results could have presented the opportunity for a career in road racing which was potentially more lucrative however, he stated that work on his father's farm did not allow him to take the time to pursue a serious career.

Draper joined the Norton racing team in 1952 and nearly won a second time at the Scottish Six Days Trial but, tire troubles held him to a second-place finish. With the Norton factory focusing their activities on road racing, Draper returned to BSA in 1953. He turned his attention to the 500cc European Motocross Championships competing against the best riders in Europe. The European championship was considered to be the world championship at the time, as the sport of motocross had yet to develop outside of Europe. He won the championship in 1955 by one point over BSA teammate Bill Nilsson, becoming the first British rider to win the European Motocross Championship. In the 1956 500cc European Motocross Championships, he finished second to countryman, Les Archer, Jr.

Draper won five Grand Prix victories during his international racing career and was a member of seven victorious British Motocross des Nations teams (1949, 1950, 1953, 1954, 1956, 1957, 1959). He was also the top individual points scorer at the 1950 Motocross des Nations event.

Draper's motorcycle competition career extended into the 1960s; he also represented the United Kingdom in the International Six Days Trial. He continued to ride BSA after his factory contract had lapsed and never admitted to having retired from competition. Draper died at the age of 73.
