= Crescent (bicycle) =

Swedish bicycle brand

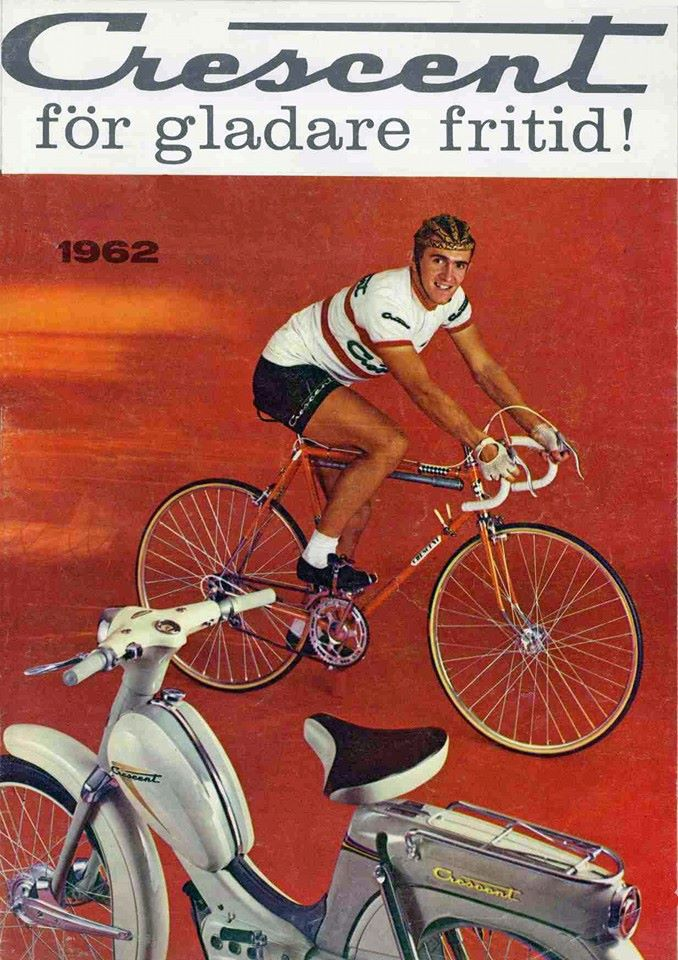
Advertisement in 1962

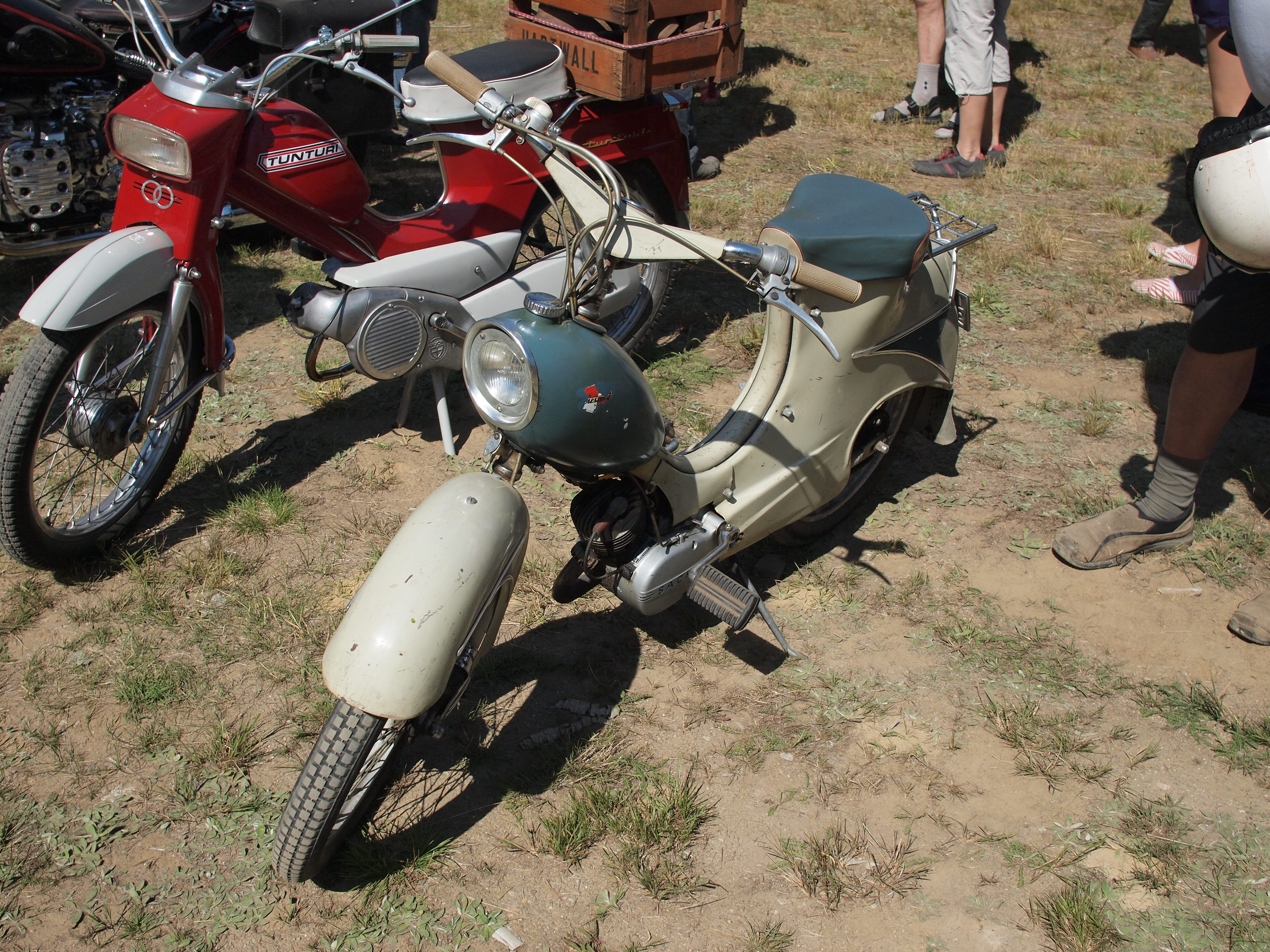
Crescent 2000 moped

Crescent is a Swedish bicycle brand. Crescent started production in 1908. Although Crescent is a Swedish brand, its roots began in Chicago, where Western Wheel Works manufactured bikes with the same brand.

Crescent's factory is located in Varberg, Sweden. There is also a bicycle museum.

in late 1990s, Crescent has been part of Cycleurope, also Monark and Bianchi.

== Mopeds and Strollers ==
Crescent started to make mopeds in 1952 and Strollers in 2007.

== Boats ==
Crescent started to make also boats in 1957.
