= René Baeten =

Belgian motorcycle racer (1927–1960)

- Nationality: Belgian
- Born: 10 June 1927; Herentals, Belgium
- Died: 5 June 1960 (aged 32); Stekene, Belgium

Motocross career
- Years active: 1947 - 1960
- Teams: FN
- Championships: 500cc - 1958
- Wins: 8

René Gommarus Desire Baeten (10 June 1927 – 5 June 1960) was a Belgian professional motocross racer. He competed in the Motocross World Championships from 1947 to 1960. Baeten is notable for winning the 1958 500cc Motocross World Championship. In 1958, Baeten was named the recipient of the Belgian National Sports Merit Award.

Baeten was born in Herentals, Belgium on 10 June 1927. In 1953 and 1954, Baeten finished second in the 500cc European motocross championships to Auguste Mingels. In 1957, the F.I.M. upgraded the competition to world championship status, and again Baeten would finish in second place, this time to Bill Nilsson on an AJS motorcycle. In 1958, Baeten would ride an FN motorcycle to claim the 500cc motocross world championship, defeating Nilsson and Sten Lundin. He was honored for his achievement with the 1958 Belgian National Sports Merit Award.

When the FN factory decided to withdraw from motocross competition in 1959, Baeten was forced to compete as a privateer riding a less-competitive AJS motorcycle and dropped to ninth place in the 1959 championship. He died from injuries sustained in a motocross race in Stekene, Belgium on 5 June 1960.
