= Victor Leloup =

Belgian motorcycle racer

Victor Lelup
- Nationality: Belgian
- Born: 13 March 1924 Liège, Belgium
- Died: February 22, 2006 (aged 81) Liège, Belgium

Motocross career
- Years active: 1945 - 1955
- Teams: Saroléa; FN
- Championships: 1

Victor Lelup (13 March 1924 - 22 February 2006) was a Belgian professional motocross rider, winner of the first Motocross World Championship in 1952 in the main class (at that time the 500cc).
