= Les Archer Jr. =

English motorcycle racer (1929–2019)

Les Archer
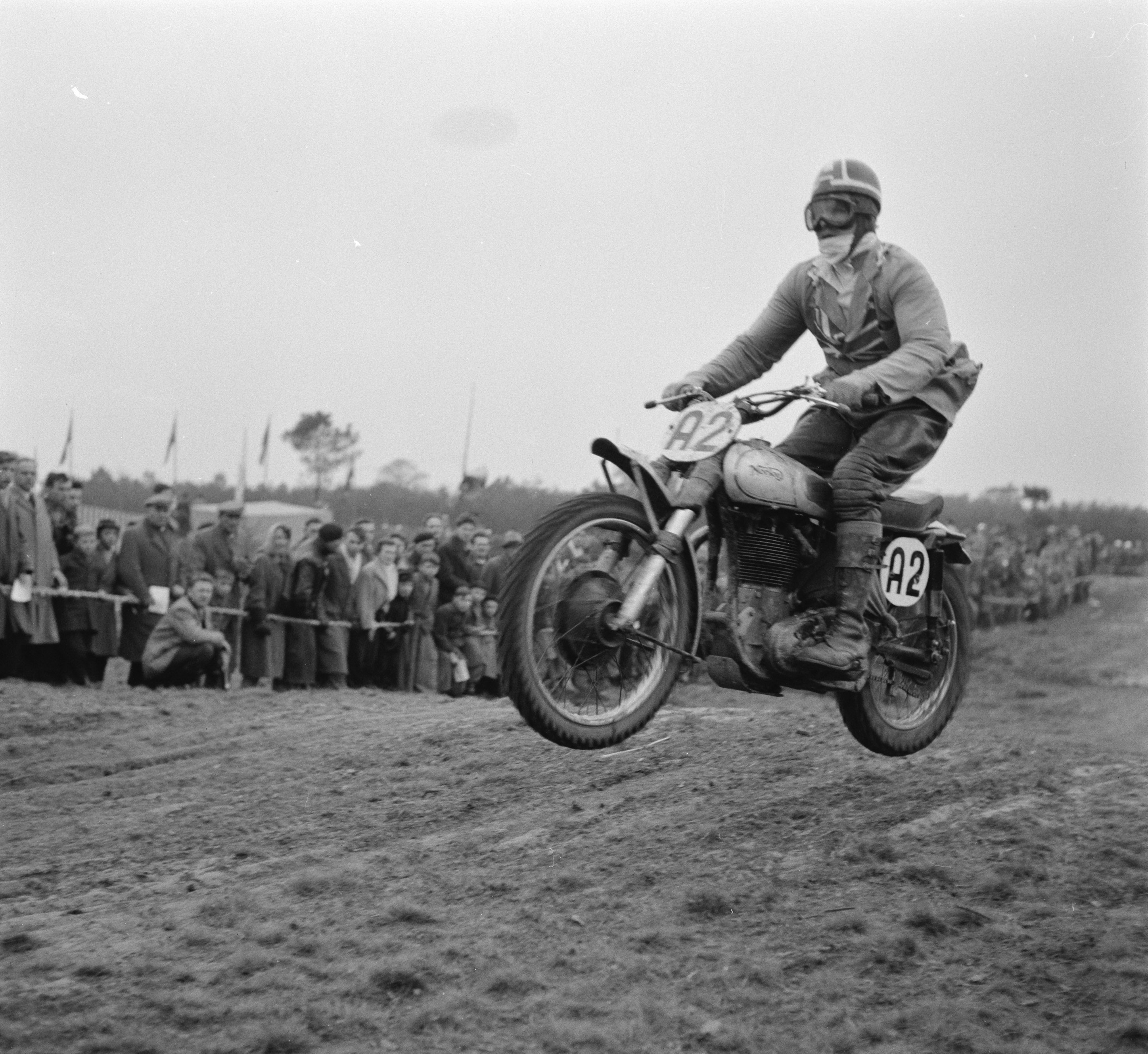
- Archer in 1956.
- Nationality: British
- Born: 27 February 1929 Farnham, Surrey
- Died: 18 December 2019 (aged 90) Calp, Spain

Motocross career
- Years active: 1946-1967
- Teams: Norton
- Championships: 500cc – 1956 (European)
- Wins: 10

Leslie Archer, best known as Les Archer Jr. (27 February 1929 – 18 December 2019), was an English former leading motorcycle racer of the 1950s, competing in long-distance speed trials, road racing and scrambles, now known as motocross.

He was the son of Les Archer, also a top motorcycle racer from the 1920s. Archer is notable for winning the 1956 F.I.M. 500cc European Motocross Championship on a highly modified Manx Norton.

== Biography ==
Archer rode for the New Imperial factory at the 1947 Isle of Man TT, and competed in the 1950 International Six Days Trial as a member of the British Army team. He competed alongside his traveling companion Eric Cheney, who went on to become one of the top British motorcycle designers. Archer was also a member of the victorious British teams at the 1952 and 1953 Motocross des Nations events. Archer competed in the FIM European motocross championship with a tenth-place finish in 1954 then, improving to a fifth place in the 1955 championship. In 1956, he succeeded in winning the 500cc European motocross championship over the defending champion and countryman John Draper. Archer further developed the Manx Norton into the 1960s with engine preparation by famed tuner Ray Petty.

Archer died aged 90 in Spain in December 2019 where he had been living since his retirement.
