= Saroléa =

Defunct Belgian motor vehicle manufacturer

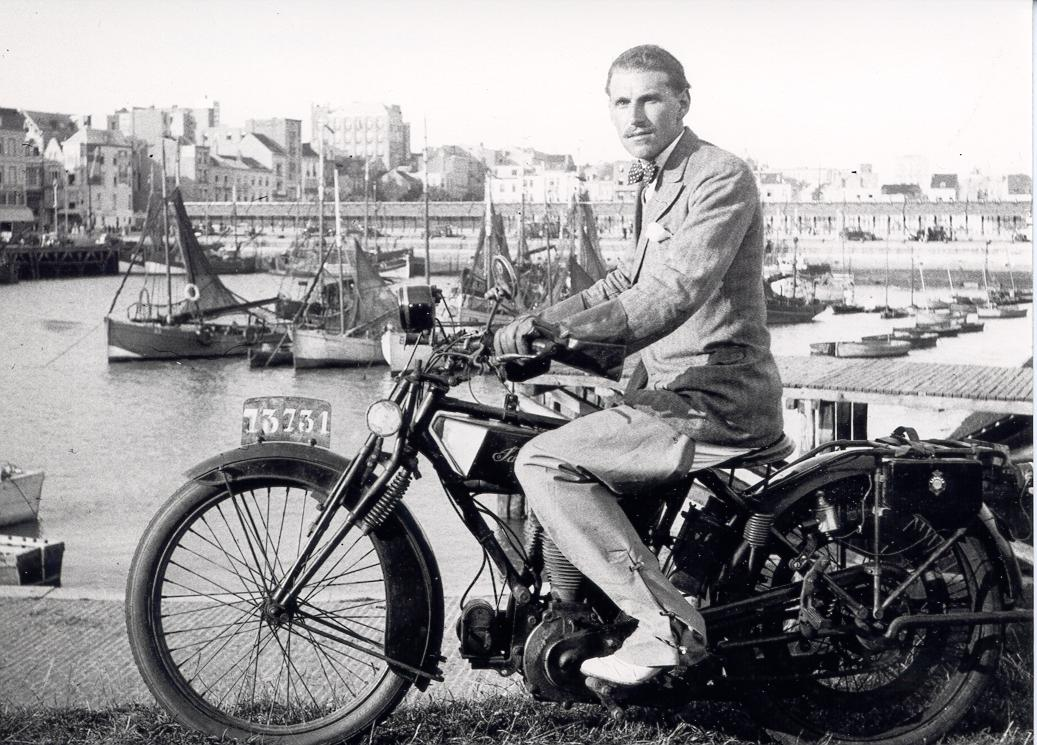
Architect Léon van Dievoet on his Saroléa at Blankenberge, 16 July 1934

Saroléa was an historic Belgian manufacturer, initially of bicycles from 1892 followed by motorcycles, ending production in 1963. The name was acquired and used by a new business from 2008.

== Manufacturing to 1963 ==
Saroléa was the first Belgian producer of motorcycles, and one of the first producers of motorcycles in the world. This Belgian factory was established in 1850 as a weapons factory by Joseph Saroléa. In 1892 bicycle production started.

Joseph died in 1894 and under the management of his sons the company grew larger. In the 1920s, the firm became successfully involved with long-distance runs, reliability trials and hill climbs. From 1927 on, the company made its own gearboxes and early in 1929 the factory was extended to some 6000m^{2}. Nearly all components of the bikes were made in-house now and the production capacity grew to 50 machines per day. Later in 1929 a production facility was commissioned which brought the production capacity to 75 machines per day.

In the early years of the century Saroléas were sold in Britain under the Kerry brand. Both singles and V twins were made and the firm supplied engines to a number of firms in several countries. In turn, Saroléa used a number of British components such as Sturmey-Archer gearboxes and AMAL carburetors.

Saroléa was ready for the new decade, but the new decade also brought an economic crisis. This forced the company to expand the range of machines with cheaper models. The first of the light two strokes was brought out in 1932. It had a 147 cc (9.0 cu in) unit construction engine of Saroléa's own design. The front forks are of pressed steel construction and the ignition is taken care of by battery and coil. Bosch electrics are employed.

During World War II the factory was shut down by the Germans, and very few bikes were produced during the occupation of Belgium.

In 1952, Belgian rider, Victor Leloup, rode a Saroléa to victory in the inaugural F.I.M. European Motocross Championship. In 1955, Saroléa started a joint venture together with FN (motorcycle) and Gillet Herstal. This lasted until 1960 when Saroléa was merged into Gillet. Saroléa ceased to exist in 1963. Sarolea used a Sachs 200 engine at some time (probably some time after World War 2. That engine was basically the same as used on the Messerschmitt KR200 but there were some different parts from the Messerschmitt engine.

== From 2008 ==
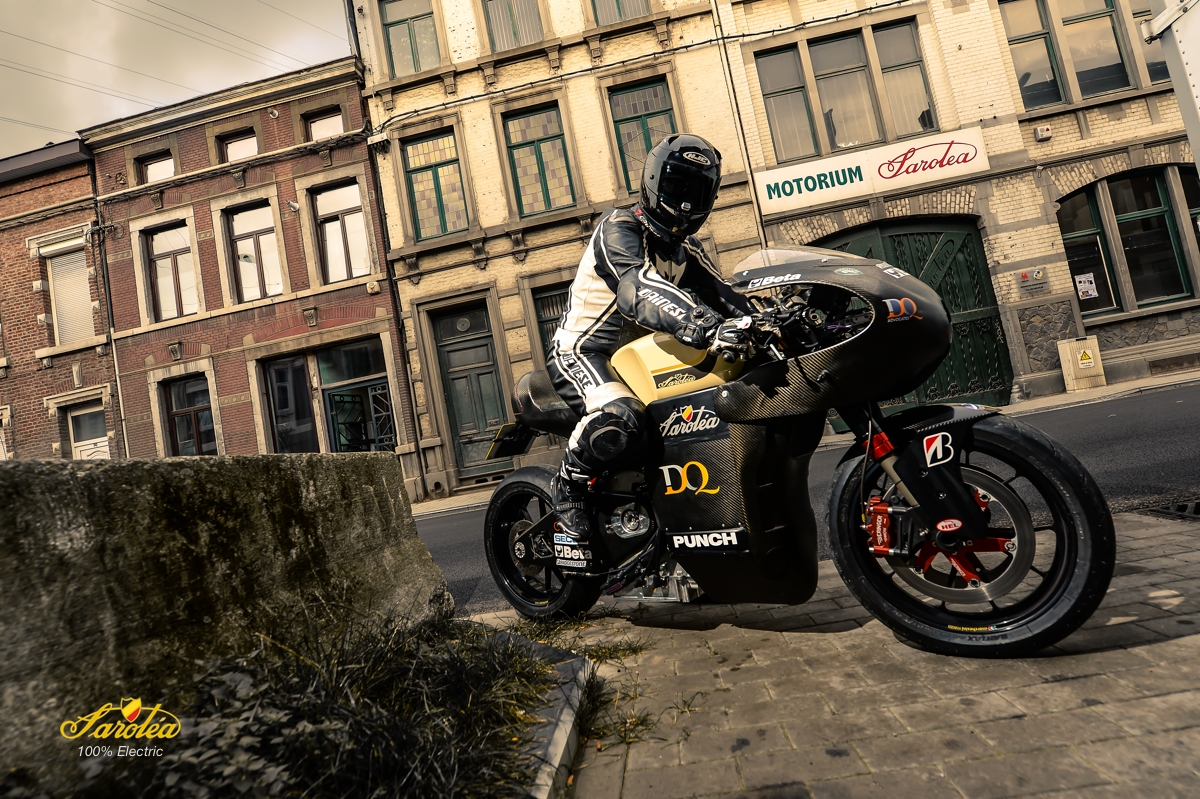
Saroléa SP7

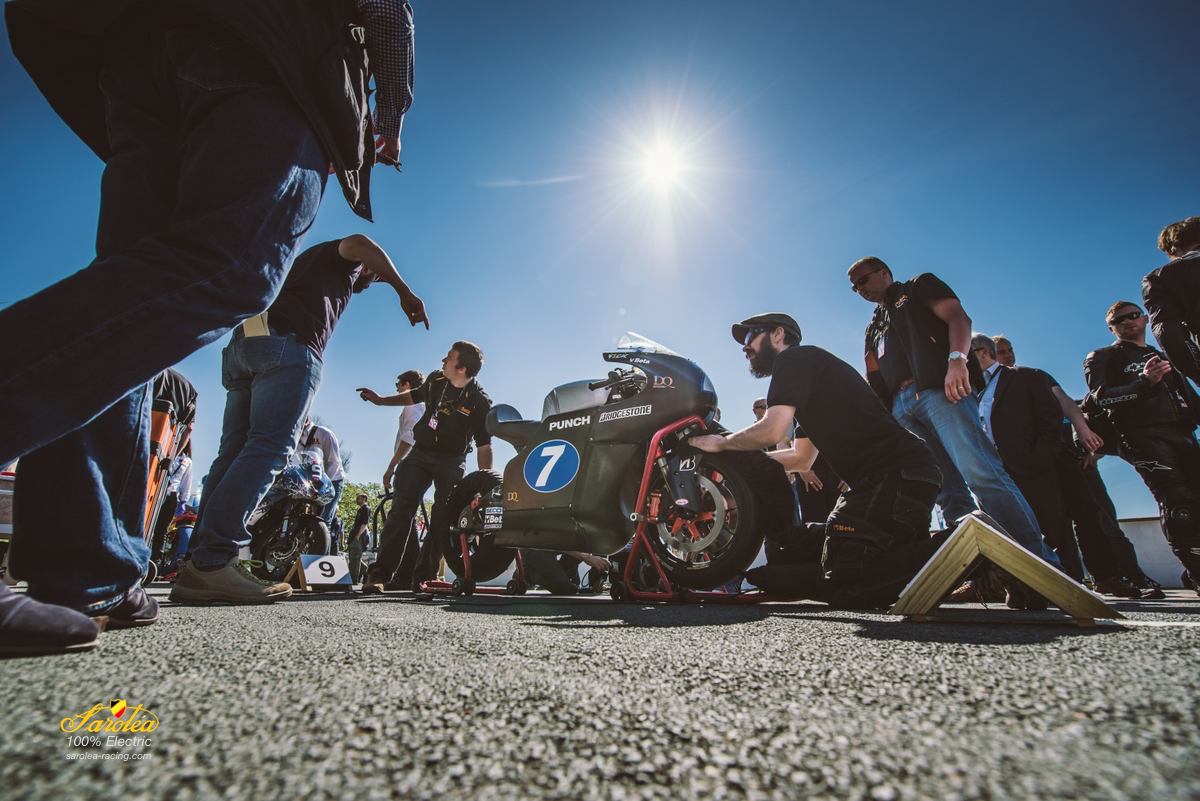
Saroléa race team at Isle of Man TT Zero grid

In 2008, a motorcycle company using the name Saroléa was established in Belgium by twin brothers, Torsten and Bjorn Robbens, to develop and produce high-performance 100% electric race machines.

Saroléa bikes are built by hand at their workshop in Belgium. All components are designed and built by Torsten Robbens, who has a background in motorsport, aerospace and military manufacturing.

The company has announced it will launch a limited edition superbike for the road market based on the same technology and performance as its SP7 TT race bike.

== Motorcycle racing ==
The Saroléa race team competed in the Isle of Man TT Zero race in 2014, finishing in fourth place and again in 2015 with a fifth place at an average speed for the one-lap event of 106 mph (171 km/h).

In 2016, the team entered the TT Zero Race with two SP7 bikes and two new riders, Lee Johnston and Dean Harrison, but the machines were wheeled away from the start-line without even practicing on the course, having only test-circulated at Jurby Motodrome, a short-circuit made from converted airfield roadways. The business later issued a press-statement, alleging problems with data-mapping.
