= Saxtorp TT-races =

Annual motorcycle races held in Sweden

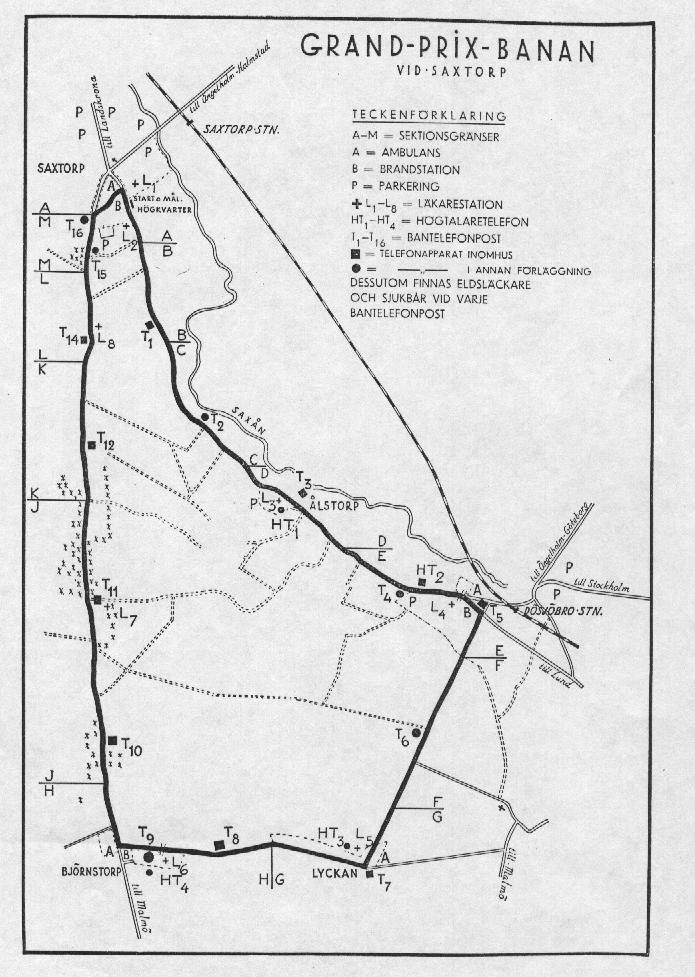
Saxtorp Grand Prix layout map

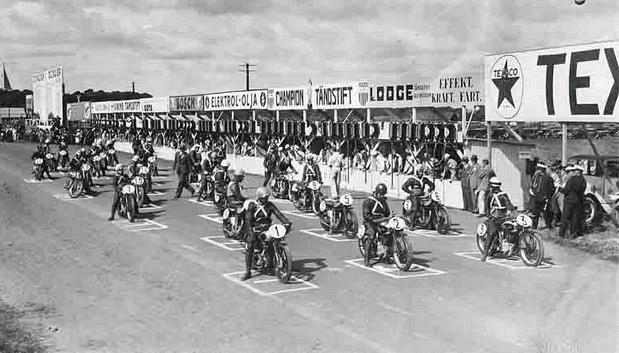
The line up for the 1933 Saxtorp TT-motorcycle race

The Saxtorp TT-races were international motorcycle races, reminiscent of Isle of Man TT and held in Saxtorp, 10 km (6.2 mi) south of Landskrona in Scania, southernmost Sweden. The races were held in August every year during the 1930s. The official name was Sweden Grand Prix, but they were labeled "TT-lopp" in Sweden. The first race was held on 31.August 1930 and the last race was decided on 6.August 1939. The Second World War prevented further races. Axel Löfström was the "general" around the events.

The track was 13.9 km (8.6 mi) long and some of these in all ten races, gathered the largest attendances recorded, within any sporting events in Sweden ever. The largest crowds was 150.000 to 160.000 people. In 1937 a heavy rain damaged the roads from Malmö, and a traffic jam prevented people to reach Saxtorp in time. That year "only" 80.000 attended the race.

Although Sweden never became involved in the war, much of Europe lay in ruins by 1945. A few years later the TT-races began again, but they were moved to Hedemora, some 600 kilometres to the north. The Saxtorp 13.9 km raceway no longer exists, but a smaller Motocross track still remains.
