= Brian Stonebridge =

- Nationality: British
- Born: 6 June 1928; Cambridgeshire, England
- Died: October 1959 (aged 31)

Motocross career
- Years active: 1950–1959
- Teams: Matchless, BSA, Greeves
- Wins: 6

Brian Stonebridge (6 June 1928 – October 1959) was a leading English motorcycle racer of the 1950s competing in scrambles, now known as motocross.

Born in Cambridgeshire, England, Stonebridge began riding for the Matchless scrambles team in 1950, winning a gold medal in that year's International Six Days Trial. In 1952 and 1954, he was a member of the British teams that won the Motocross des Nations. In 1954, he joined the BSA factory team, helping develop the two-stroke, BSA Bantam scrambler. Stonebridge then moved to the Greeves racing team in 1957, becoming the company Competitions Manager and Development Engineer. He competed in the 1959 250cc European Motocross Championship, finishing the year in second place behind Rolf Tibblin.

Stonebridge died in October 1959 after a road traffic accident when he was a passenger in a car driven by his 'boss' at the time, Bert Greeves.
