= Invalid carriage =

Self-propelled vehicle for disabled people

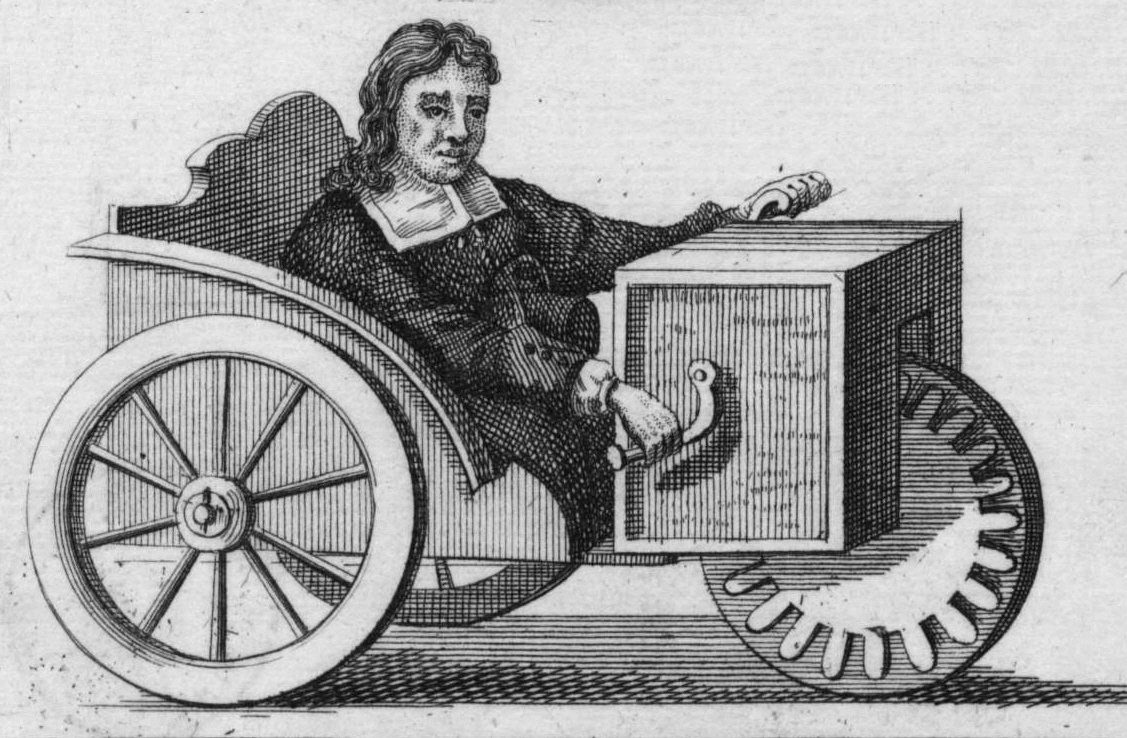
Farffler's carriage of 1655

Invalid carriages were usually single seater road vehicles, buggies, or self-propelled vehicles for disabled people. They pre-dated modern electric mobility scooters and, from the 1920s, were generally powered by small gasoline/petrol engines, although some were battery powered. They were usually designed without foot-operated controls.

The term "invalid carriage" persists in the United Kingdom in the regulation of mobility devices for disabled people, but excludes most of the more powerful, motorised types.

== History ==
=== Origins ===
Stephan Farffler was a Nuremberg watchmaker of the seventeenth century whose invention of a manumotive carriage in 1655 is widely considered to have been the first self-propelled wheelchair. He is believed to have been either a paraplegic or an amputee. As such, the chair was consistent with the later designs for self-propelled invalid carriages. The three-wheeled device is also believed to have been a precursor to the modern-day tricycle and bicycle.

In England, the forerunner of the invalid carriage was the bath chair. It was invented by James Heath, of Bath (hence the name), in the early 18th century. Animal drawn versions of the bath chair became known as invalid carriages. An 1880 Monk and Co. invalid carriage is on display at the M Shed in Bristol.

The firm of John Carter (an invalid and surgical furniture manufacturer in London, dating from 1870 to the late 1950s) advertised bath chairs, spinal carriages and self-propelling chairs, in its 1890s' list of "invalid comforts". Later it would market its products to wounded soldiers.

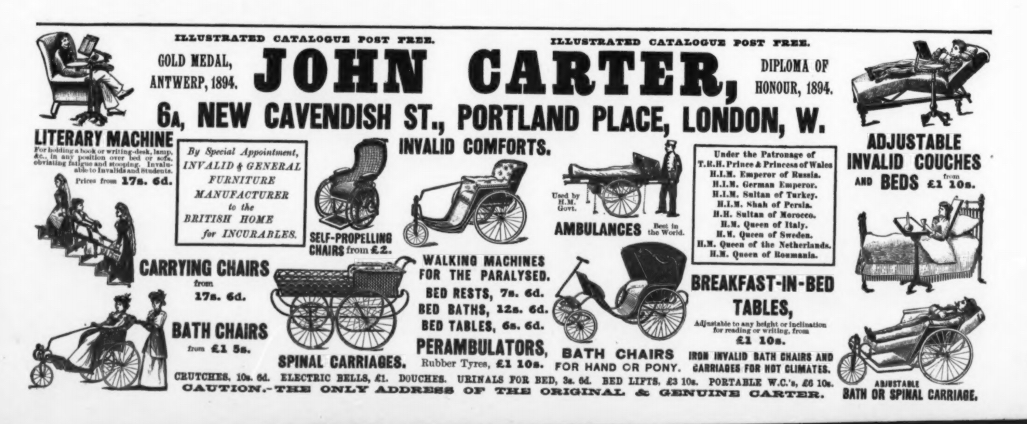
Invalid furniture in the 1890s

== Between the wars ==
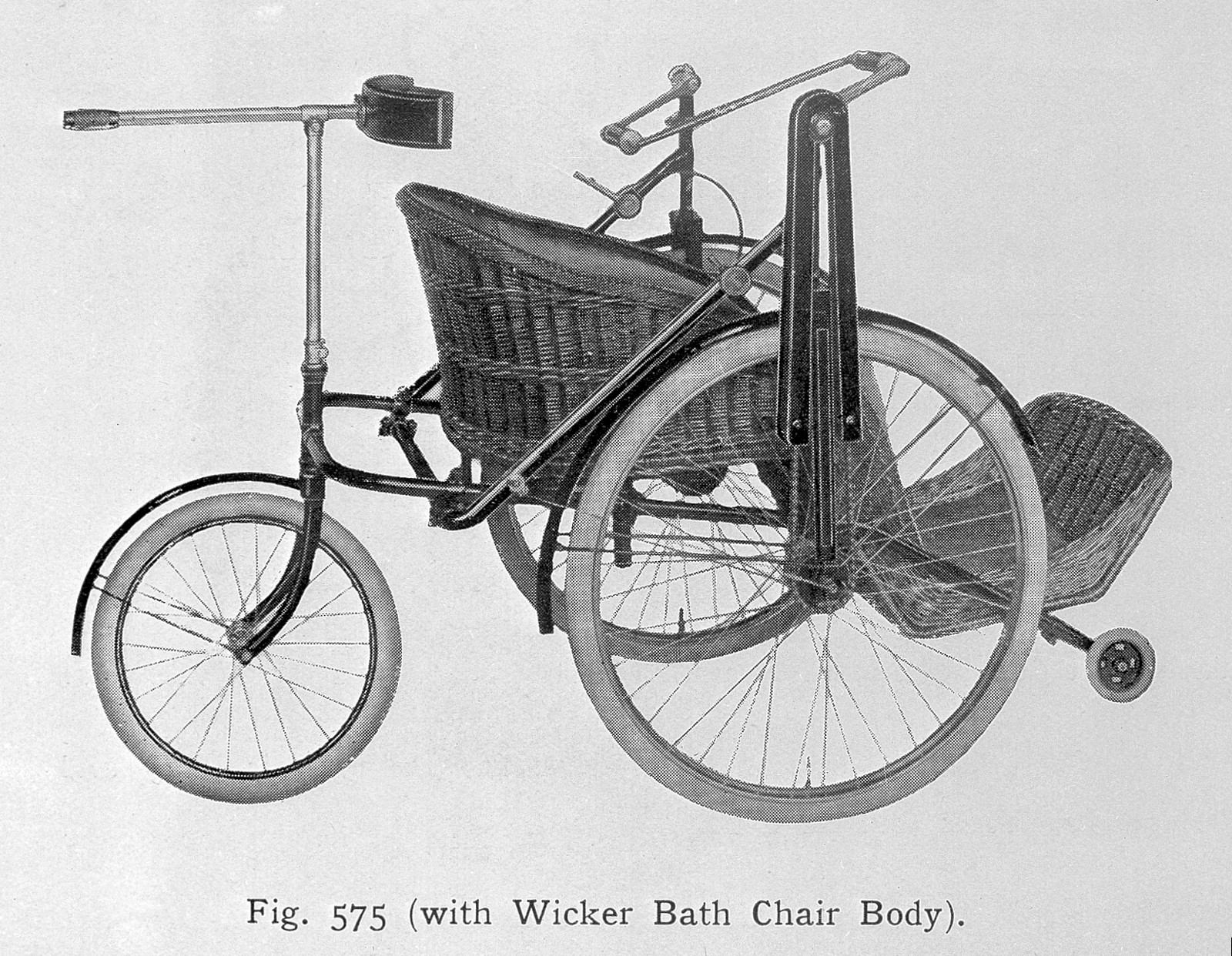
1920s rotary invalid tricycle

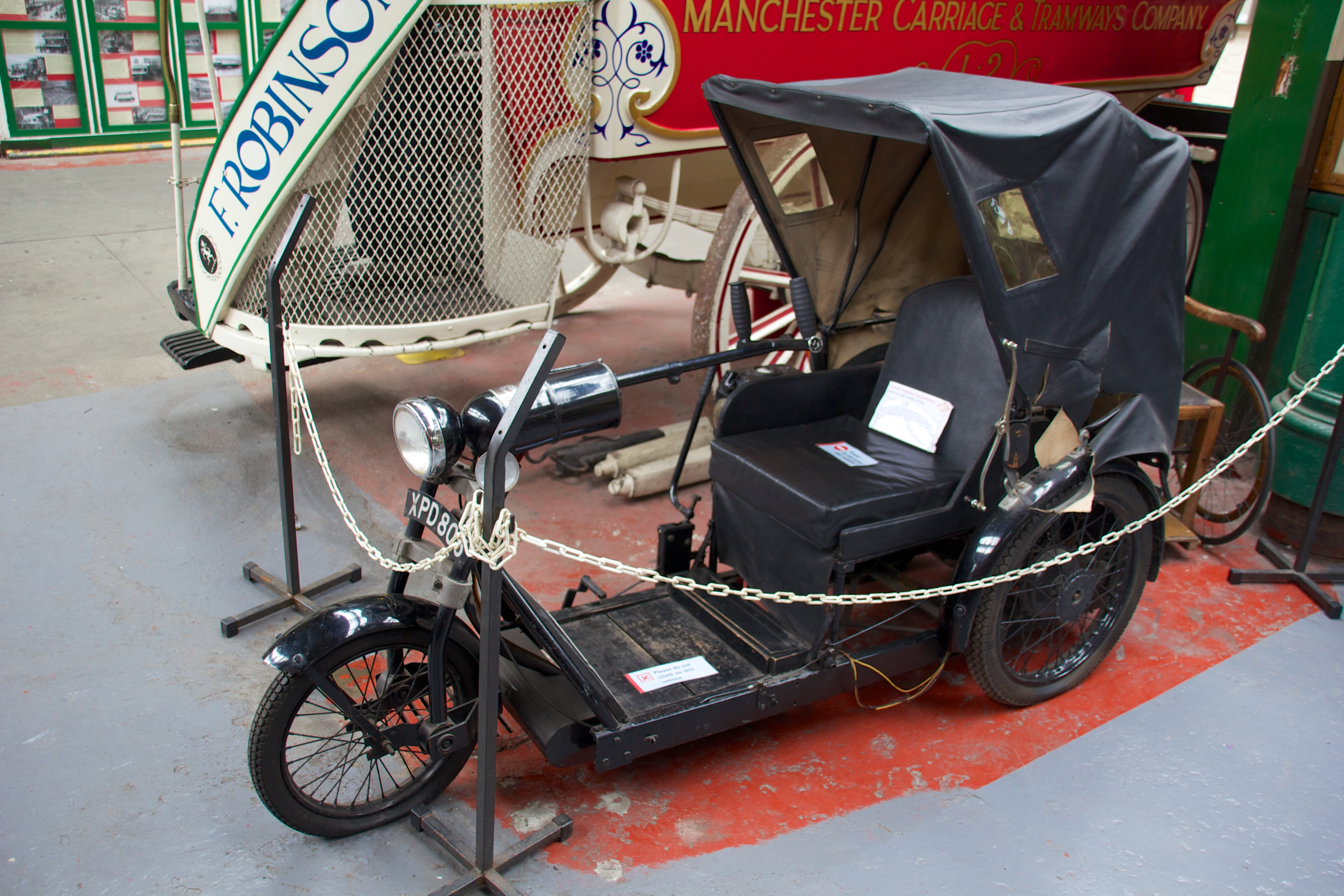
1926–1954 Argson De Luxe

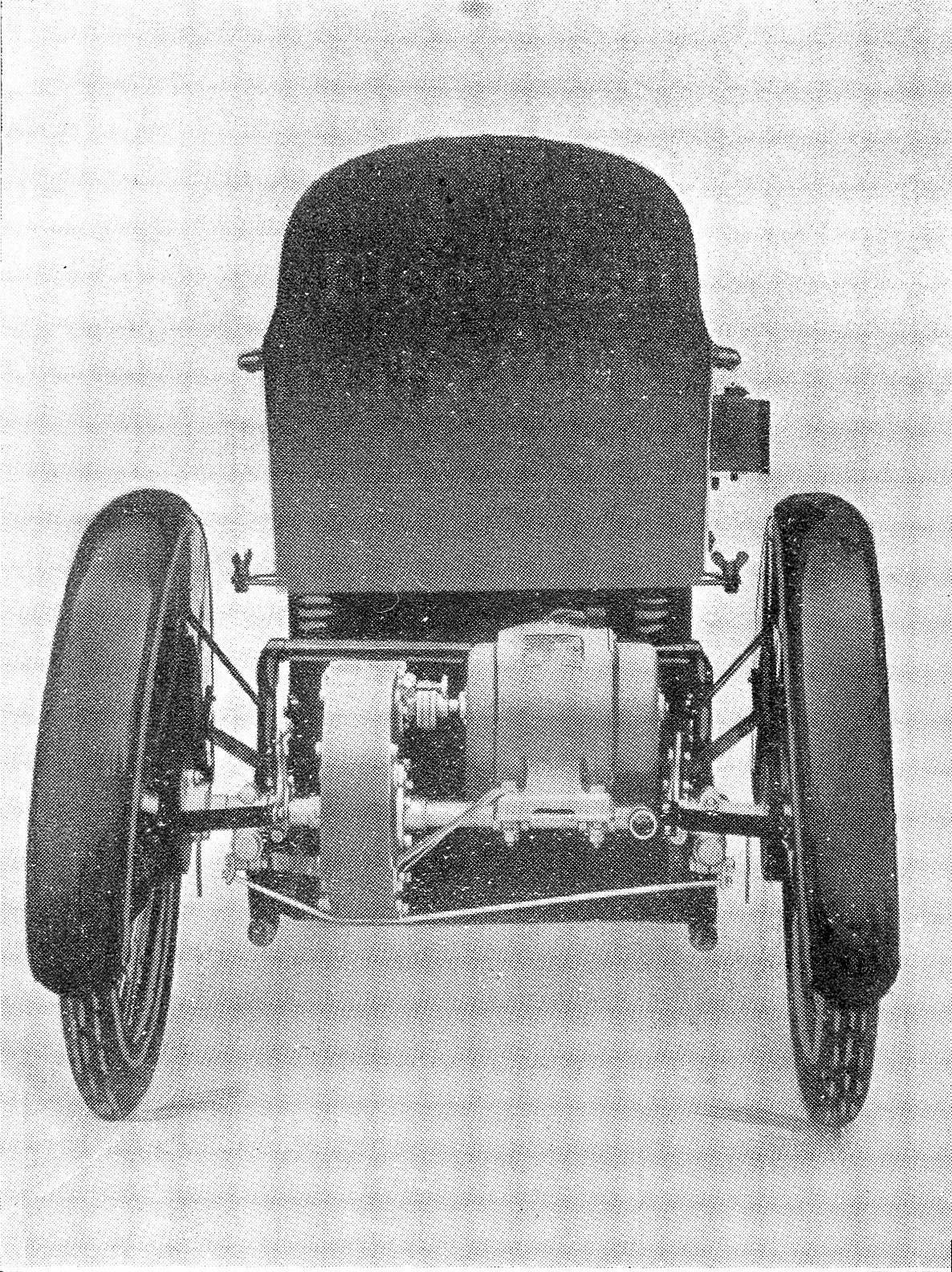
1930s Harding's electric powered invalid chair

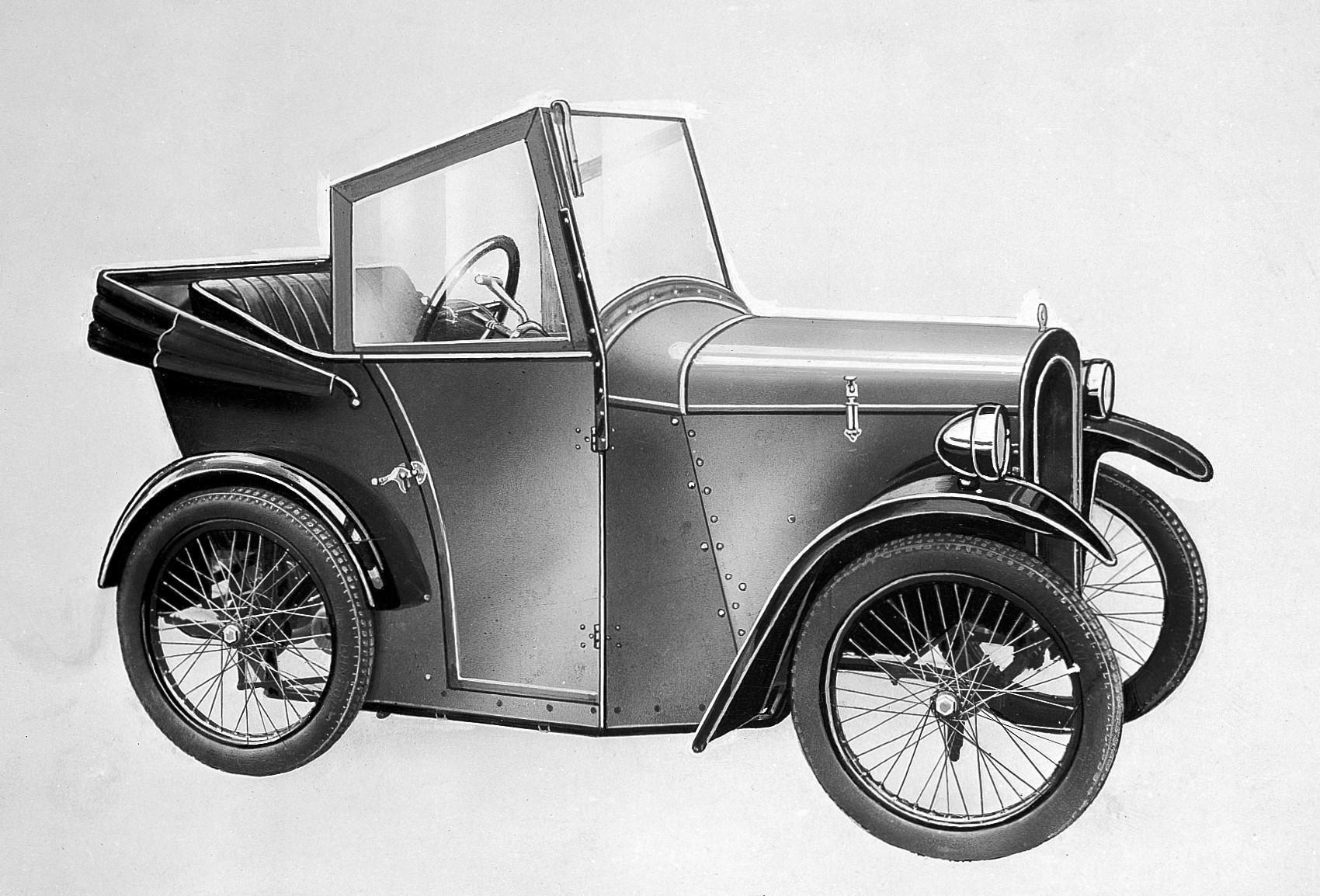
Harding's Pultney Two Seater

Stanley Engineering Co. Ltd. of Egham, Surrey, began making self-propelled invalid carriages under the 'Argson' name in the 1920s. The Argson Runnymede was designed in South Africa manufactured in England from 1936 to 1954. They were either battery-powered or had a Villiers petrol engine. A petrol powered Runnymede drove across the Alps in 1947. Stanley Engineering was bought by C. B. Harper Ltd. in 1954.

R. A. Harding Company of Bath was founded in 1921. They initially produced hand-propelled tricycles. In 1926 Harding's introduced a variety of powered invalid carriages. The De Luxe models A and B were powered by a 122cc Villiers engine, and the Pultney was powered by either a 200cc or 300cc JAP. There were also 24-volt or 36-volt electric machines. In 1945, the company was renamed R. A. Harding (Bath) Ltd., and the Pultney was discontinued. In December 1948 the De Luxe models were upgraded with larger rear wheels, a new petrol tank, and a fan-cooled Villiers 147cc unit. Hardings introduced a full-bodied model in 1956, called the Consort. Only 12 of these were made. The company closed down in 1988, having made hand-powered models until 1973 and motor-driven ones until 1966.

From the 1930s to the late 1940s, Nelco Industries made a three-wheeled battery powered vehicle. Steering was enabled by means of a tiller connected to the front wheel; the tiller also provided speed control. Forward or reverse was enabled by a separate control. The 24 volt electric motor could act as a generator to recharge the battery when going downhill.

== Post World War II ==
In 1946, Larmar Engineering made small single-seated cars that were specially designed for physically disabled people. The vehicles were only 80 cm wide and each had a body made of plywood and aluminum, a side door, seat, windshield and a soft top. A single-cylinder, two-stroke, 8 horse power engine from BSA, with 249 cc displacement, was mounted in the rear and it drove one of the rear wheels via a chain. From 1950, a two-cylinder, four-stroke, 10 hp engine, with 350 cc displacement, was available.

== United Kingdom Ministry of Health contracts (1948–1978) ==
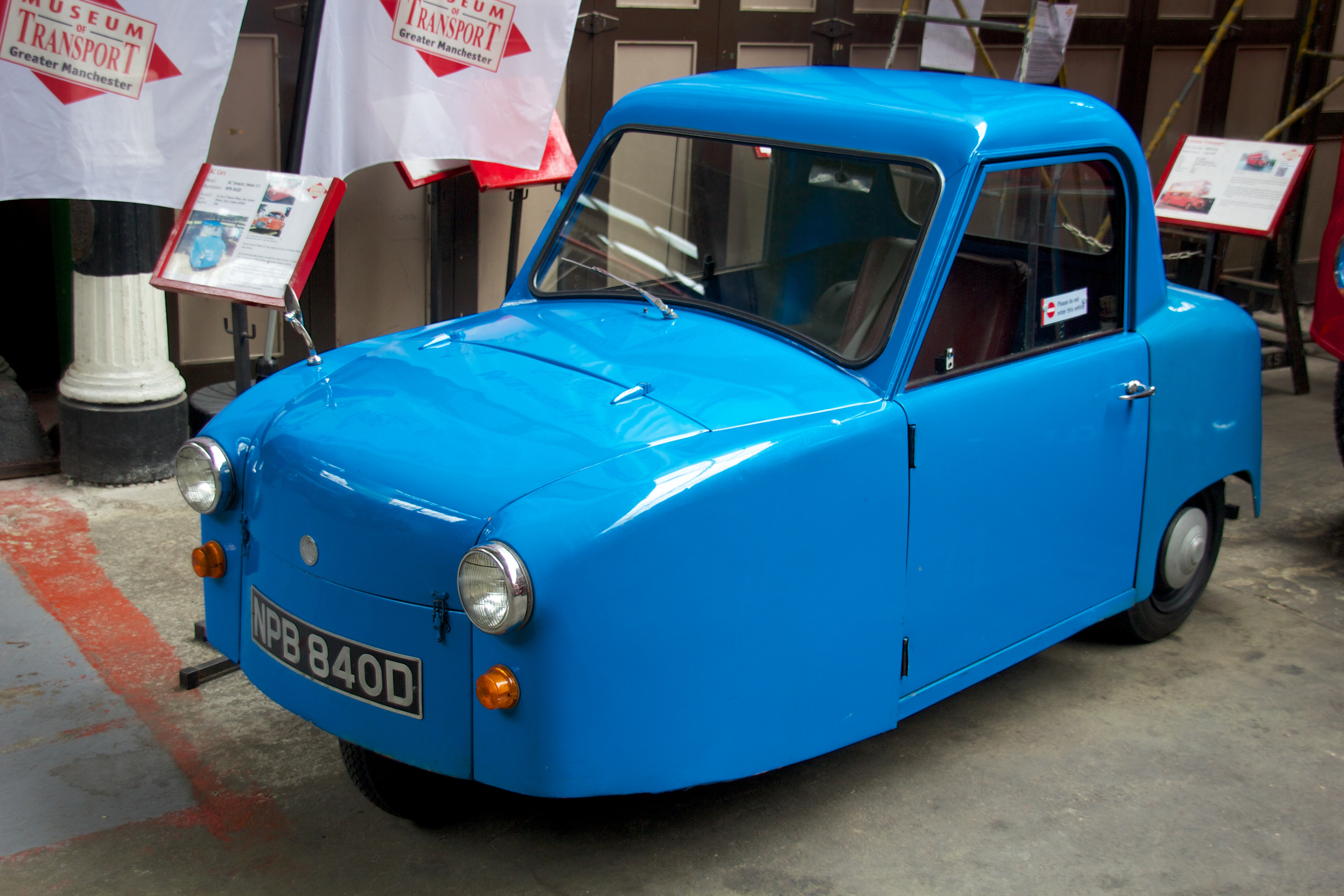
AC model 57

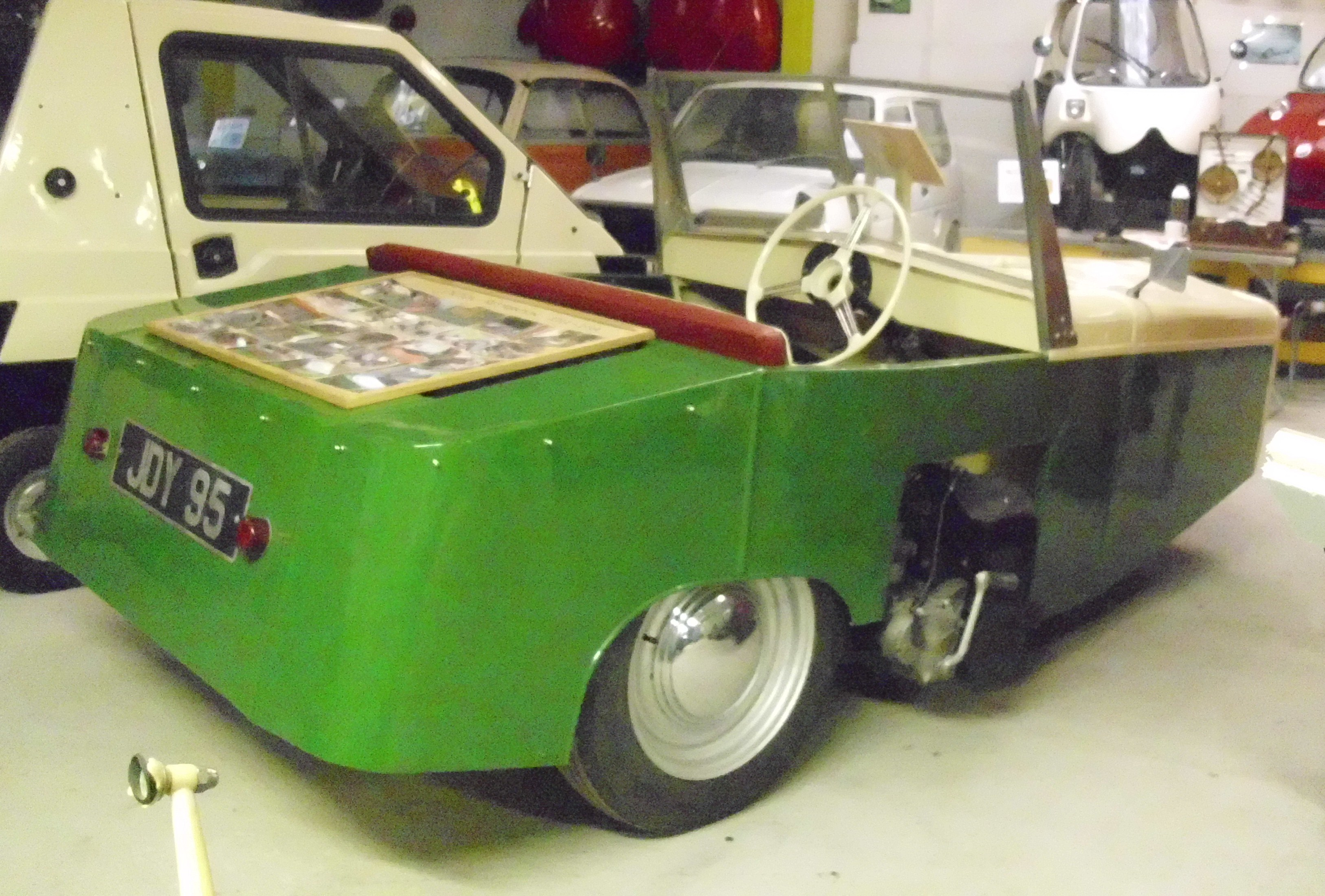
1956 Vernons Industries Gordon three-wheeled car

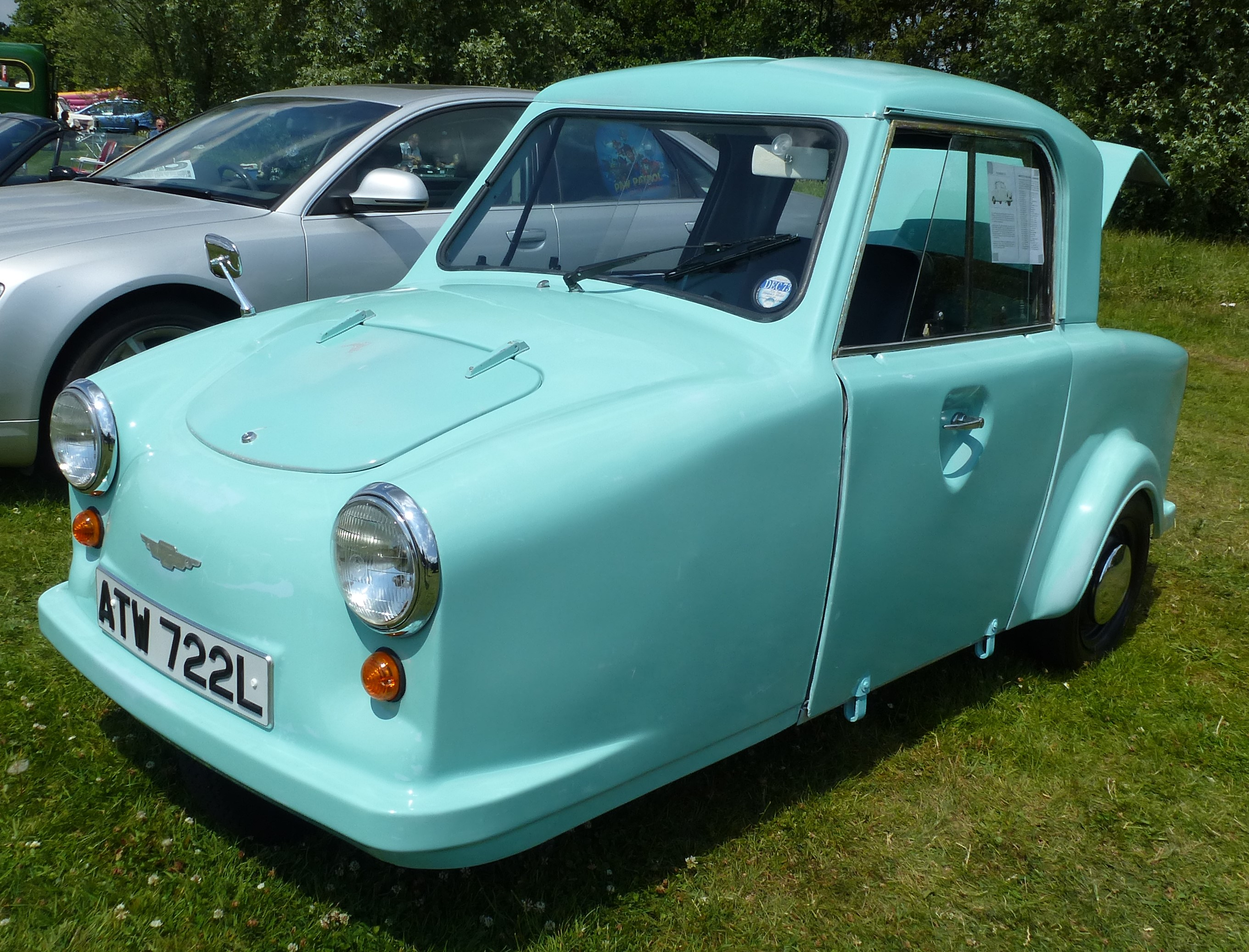
1973 Invacar

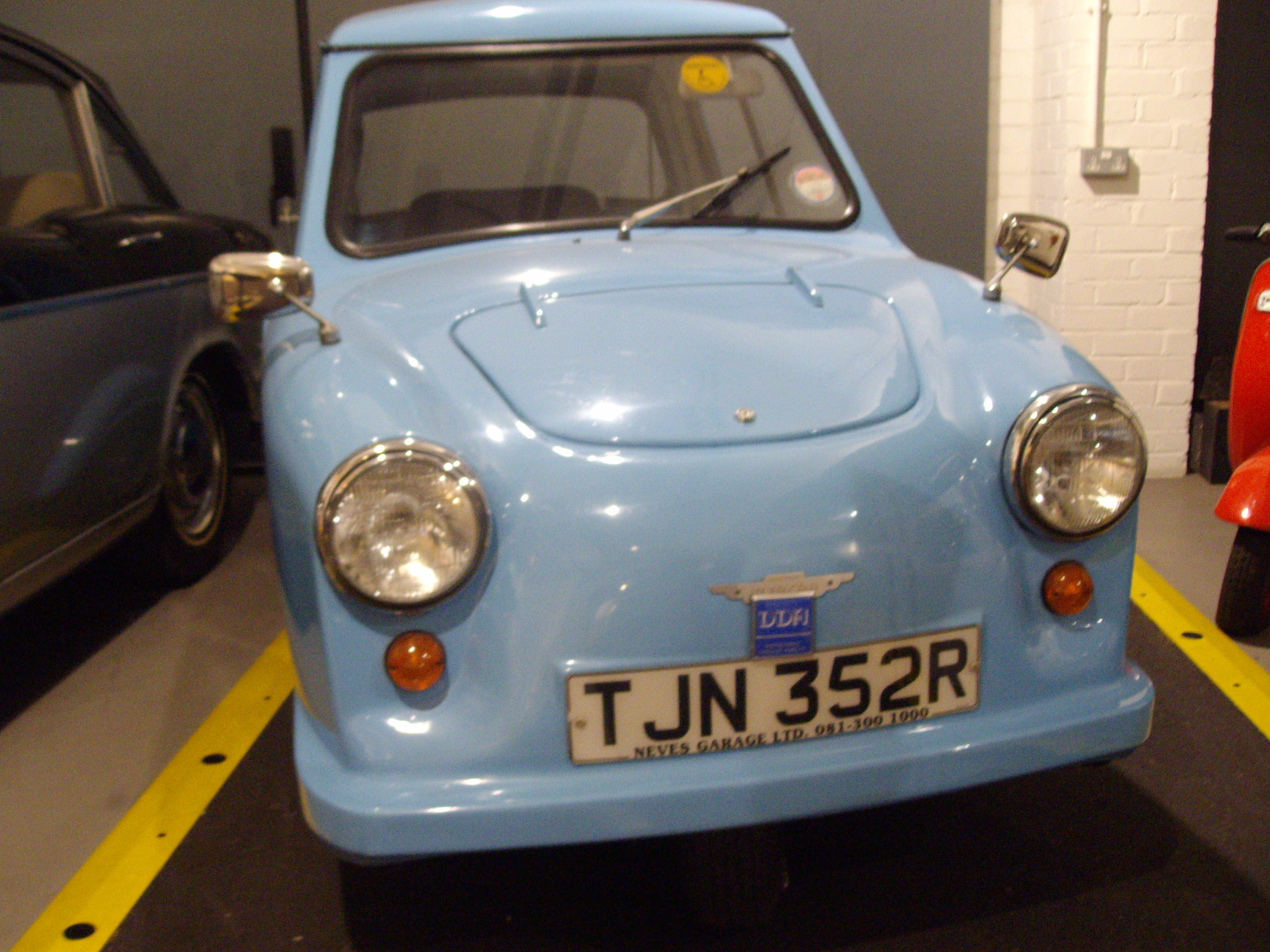
Thundersley

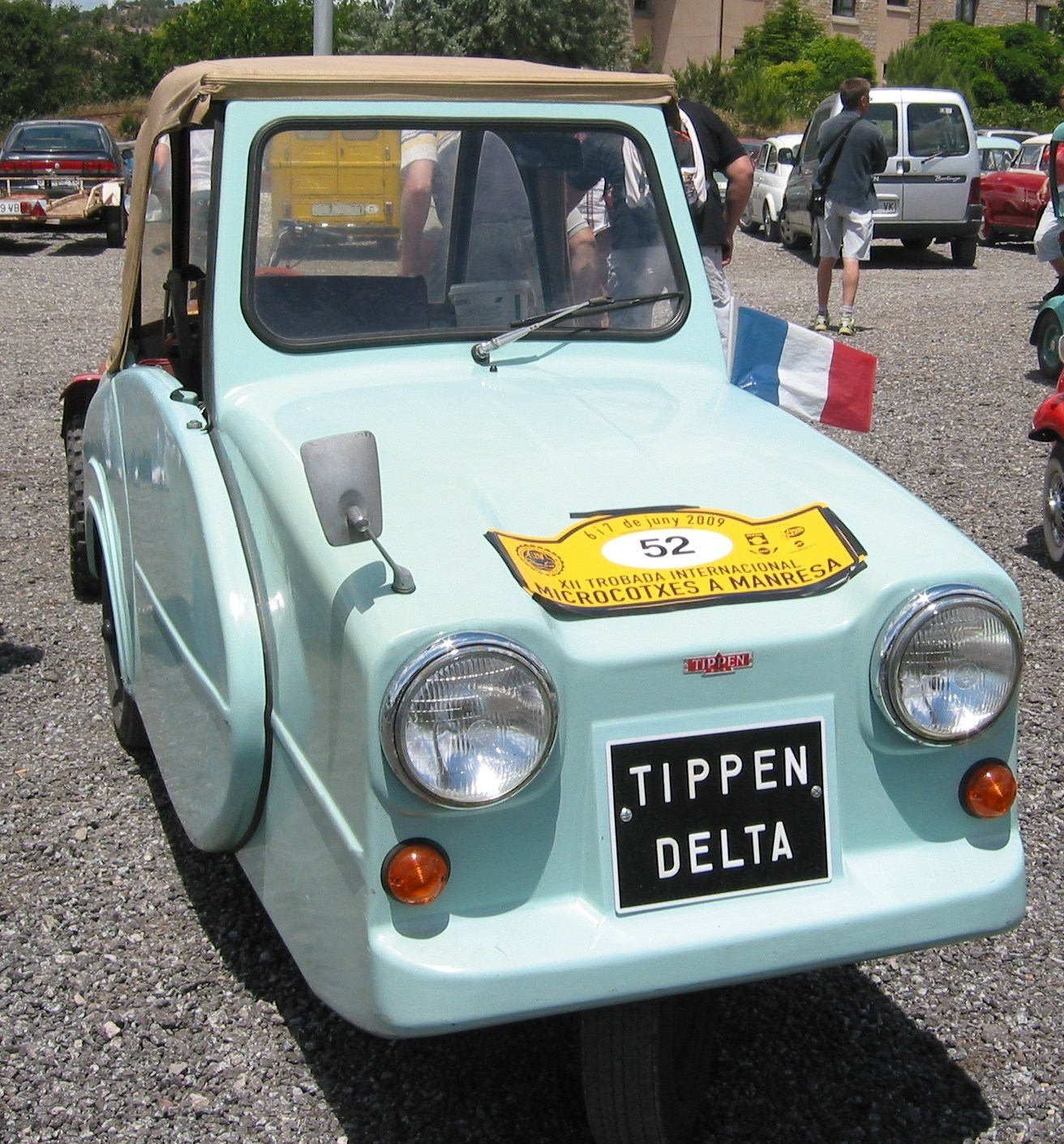
Tippen Delta

In 1948, Bert Greeves adapted a motorcycle, with the help of his paralysed cousin Derry Preston-Cobb, as transport for Preston-Cobb. Noticing the number of former servicemen injured in the Second World War, they spotted a commercial opportunity and approached the UK government for support, leading to the creation of Invacar Ltd. Invacar was not the only company to be contracted by the Ministry of Health to produce three-wheeled vehicles for disabled drivers. Others included Harding, Dingwall & Son, AC Cars, Barrett, Tippen & Son, Thundersley, Vernons Industries, and Coventry Climax.

These early vehicles were each powered by an air-cooled Villiers 147 cc engine; however, when production of that engine ceased in the early 1970s, it was replaced by a much more powerful 4-stroke 500 cc or 600 cc Steyr-Puch engine, giving a reported top speed of 82 mph (132 km/h). They were low-cost, low-maintenance vehicles, designed specifically for people with physical disabilities. Production of them stopped in 1976, and the last ones were withdrawn from the road in 2003. Some still exist, however, and approximately 25 Invacars survive, that could become roadworthy once again. There are at least five Invacars in private ownership which are "road-legal", as well as several other unroadworthy examples which are awaiting their demise, including one in the Coventry Transport Museum collection, two in the Lakeland museum in Cumbria, and one road-going example "TWC" features on the HubNut YouTube channel. Another 1976 example, one of the last made, can be found on display at the National Motor Museum, Beaulieu in Hampshire, England.

In Britain, in the 1960s and 1970s, invalid carriages were provided as subsidised, low-cost vehicles to improve the mobility of people with disabilities. Vehicles leased by the National Health Service had three wheels, were very lightweight, and therefore their suitability on roads among other traffic was often considered dubious on safety grounds. Invalid carriages are banned from motorways. All remaining NHS leased Invacar type invalid carriages were ultimately withdrawn in a safety recall in 2003.

Motorised invalid carriages, as described above, do not fall under the legal definition of "invalid carriage" under current (since 1988) regulations, unless they are limited to speeds of 8 mph or less (see below).

== Other countries ==
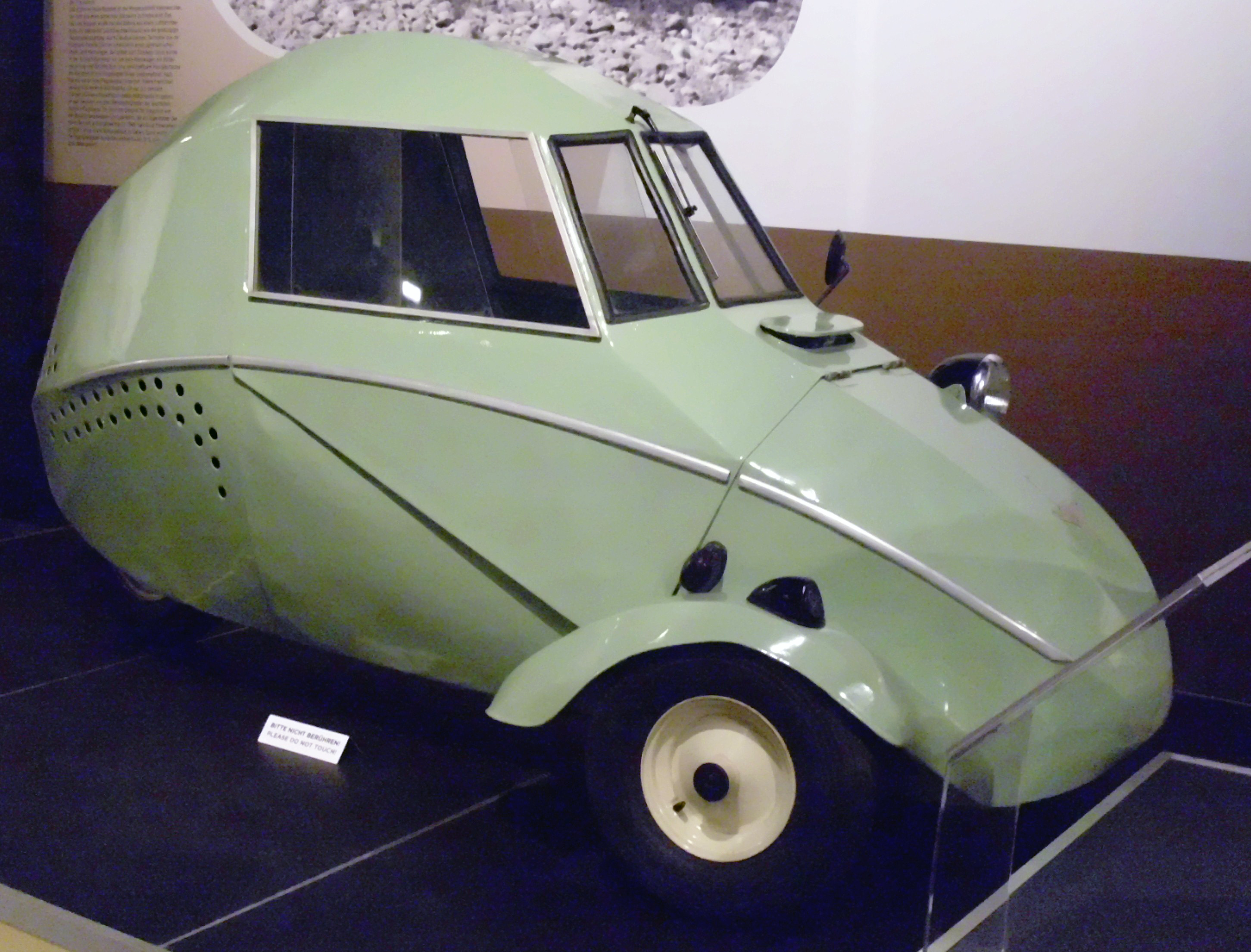
Fend Flitzer 101

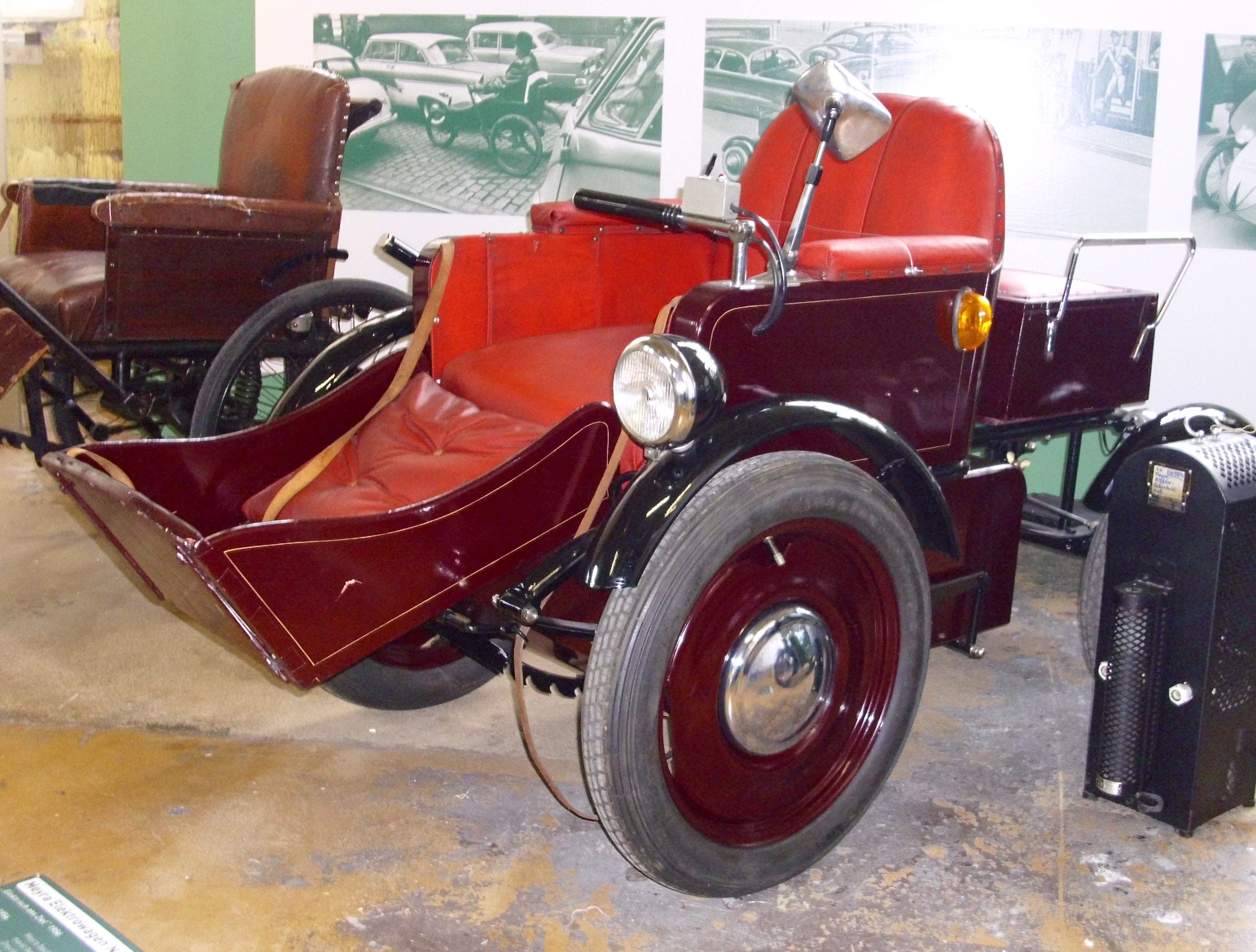
1956 Meyra Model E37

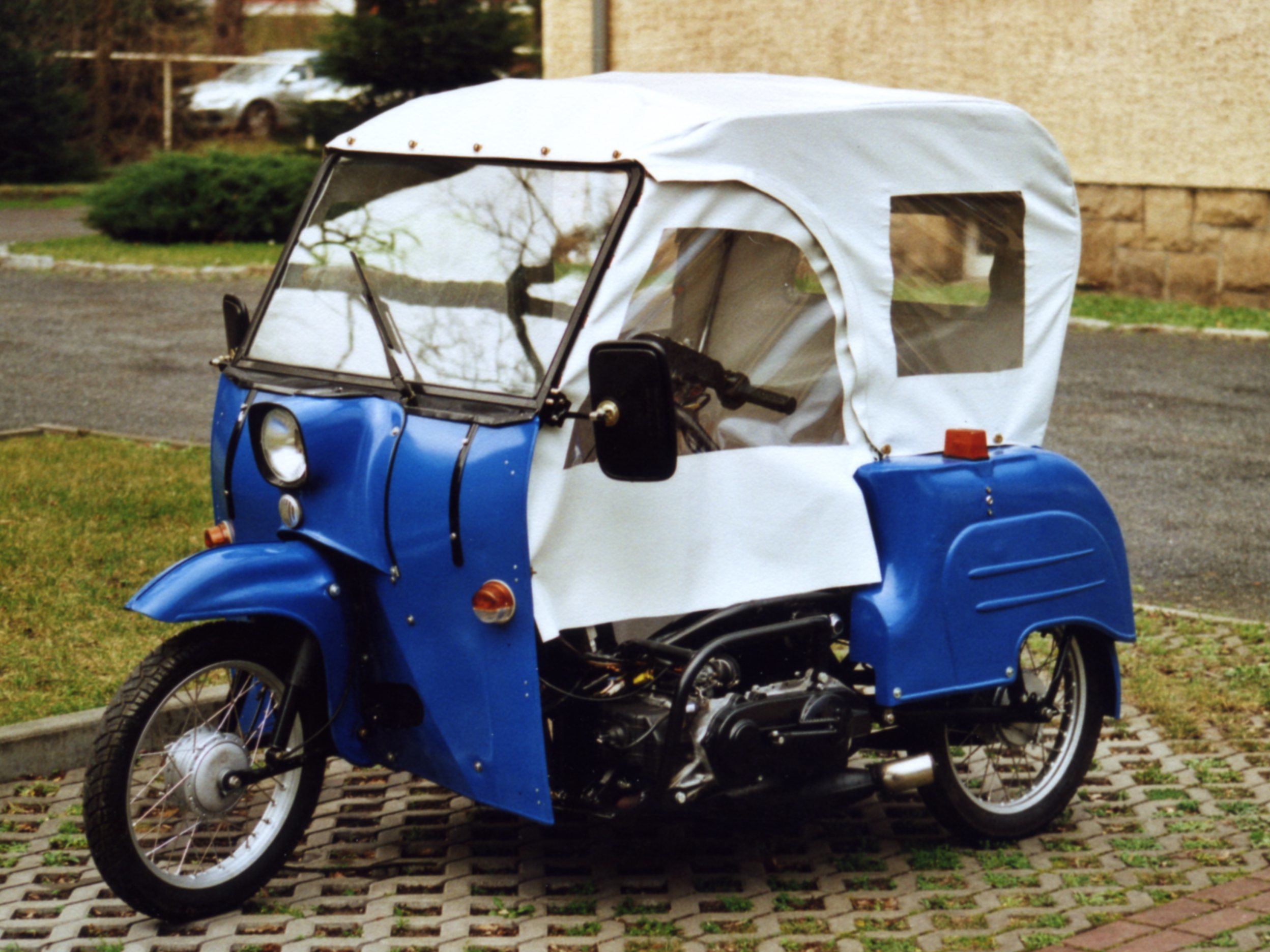
Simson DUO

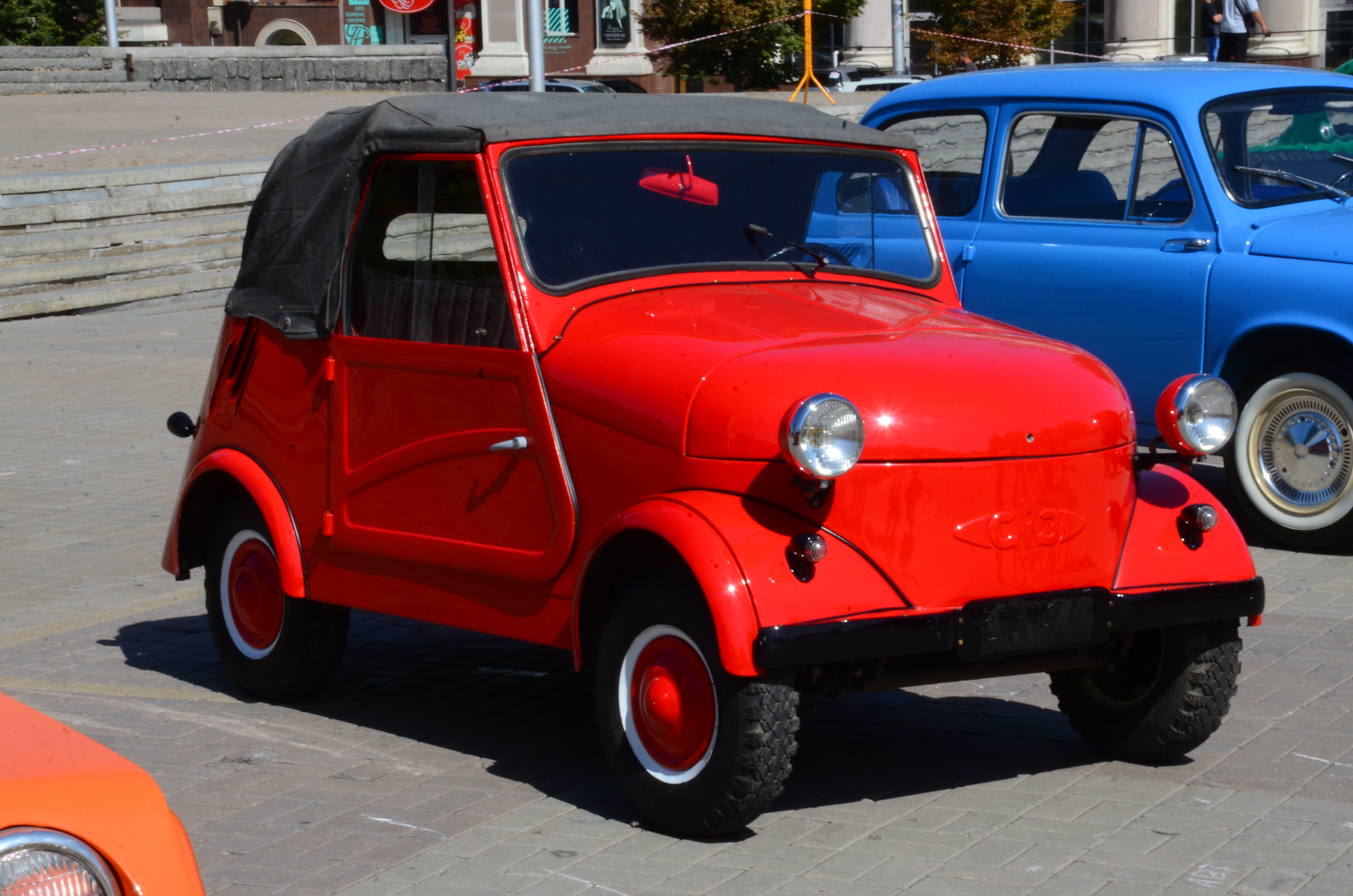
SMZ S3A

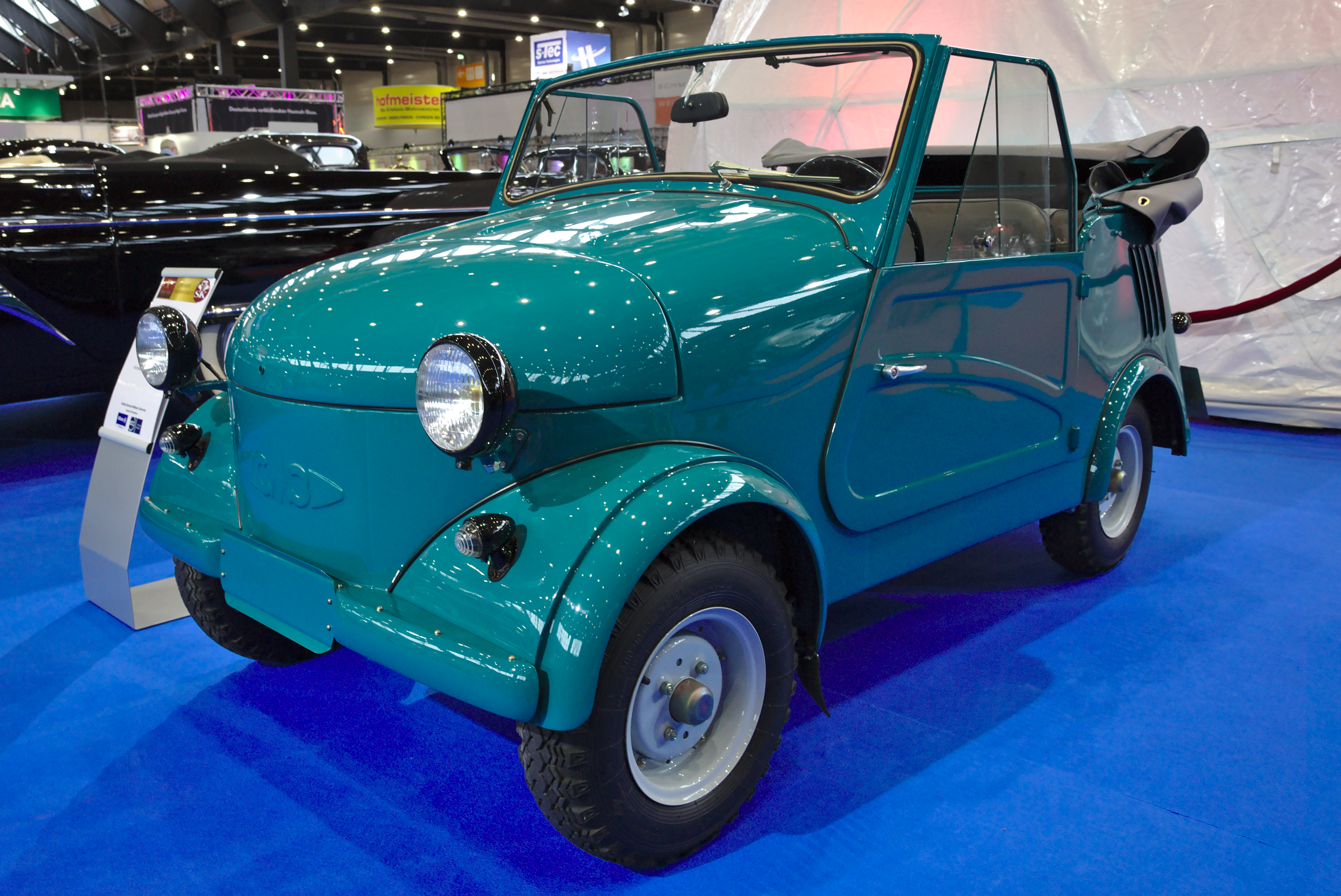
SMZ S3A-M

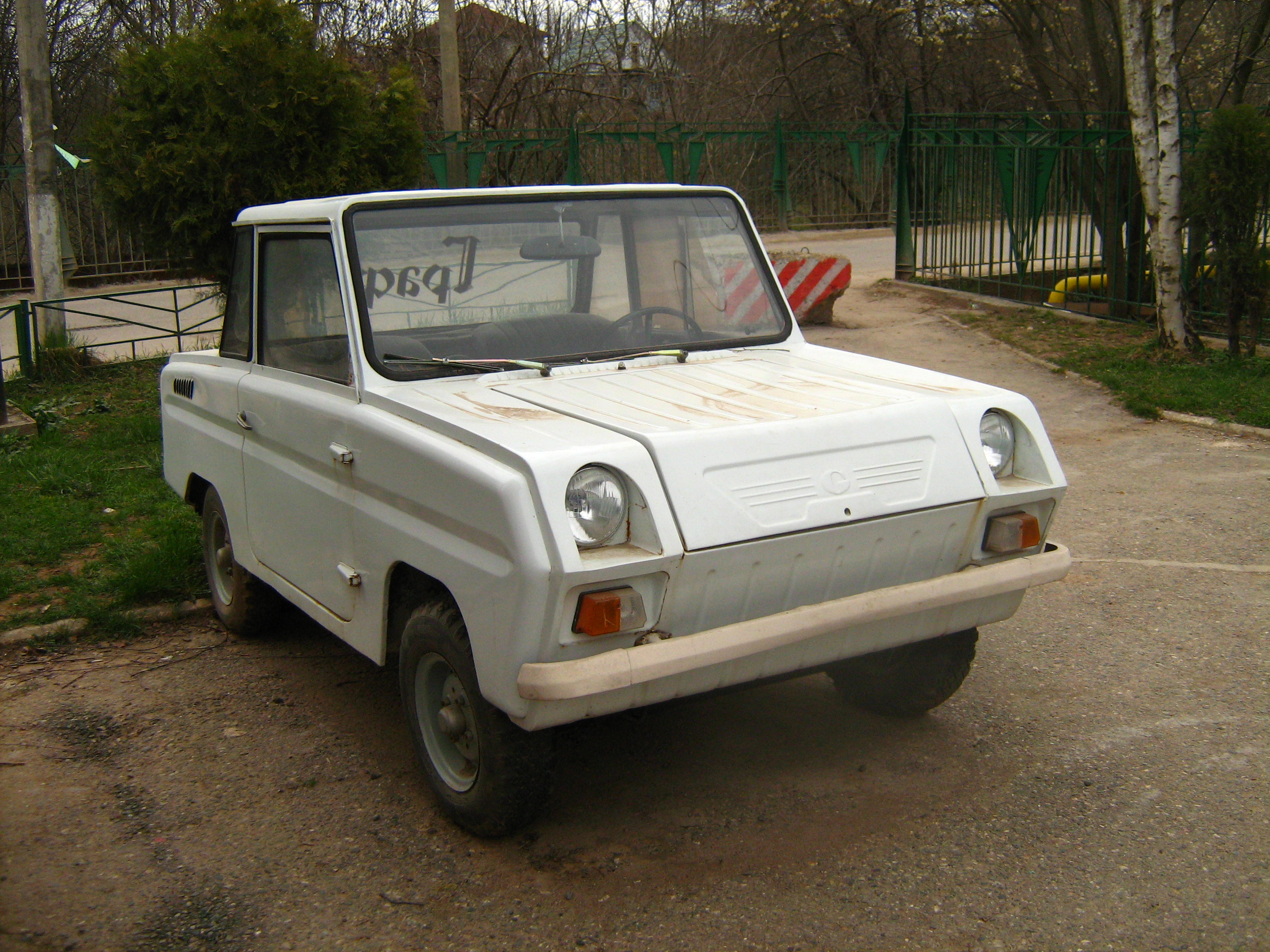
SMZ S3D

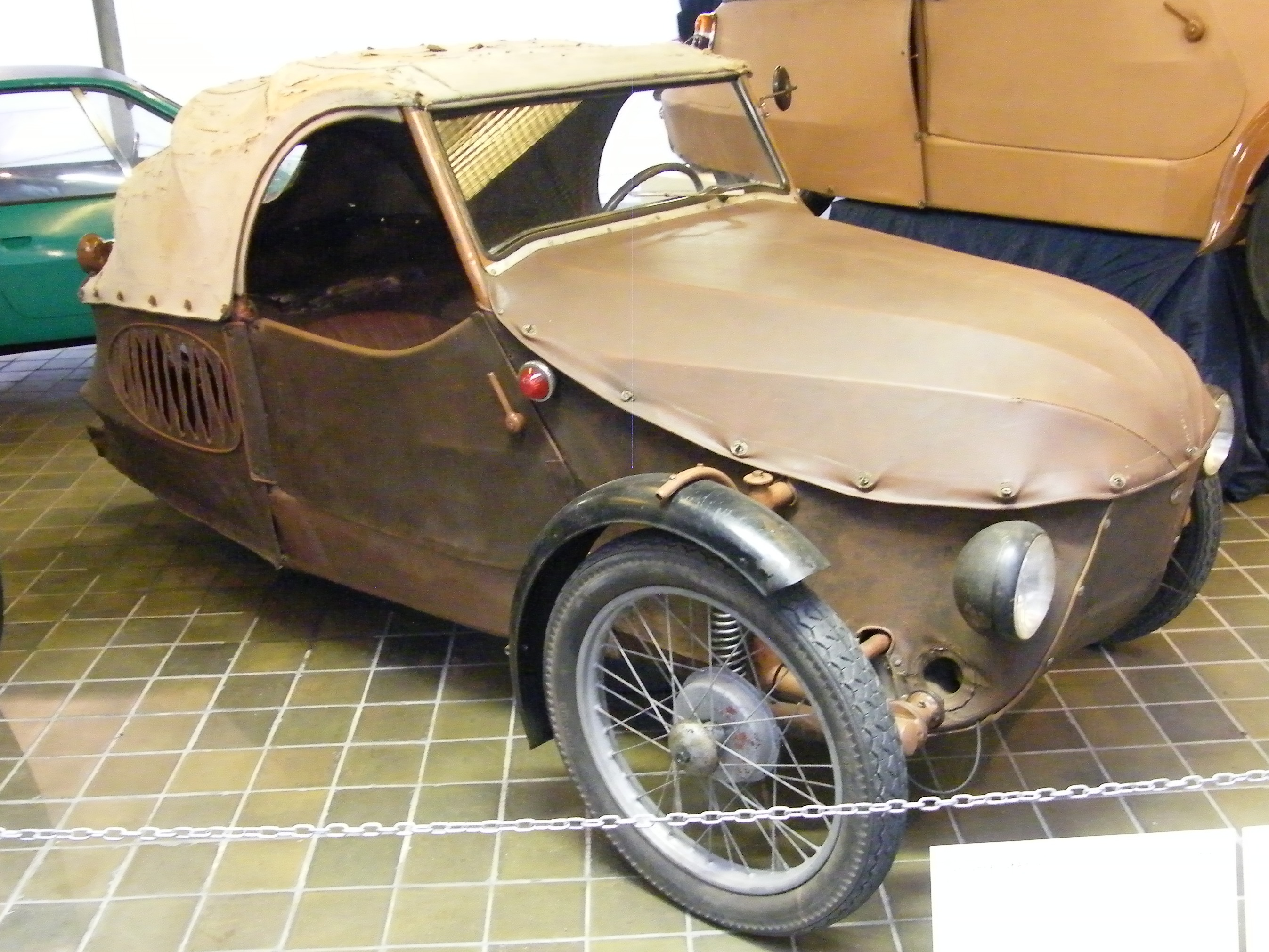
Velorex Oskar 54

Fritz Fend, a former technical officer with the Luftwaffe, also designed a three-wheel invalid carriage in 1948. The first version was unpowered, with the single wheel situated at the front. His powered version had a 38cc Victoria two-stroke engine, with a chain-driven single rear wheel; the two wheels at the front were used for steering. This latter version was called the Fend Flitzer, and some 250 were made between 1948 and 1951, when production ceased.

Invalid carriages were also made in other countries, including Simson DUO in East Germany, SMZ in the Soviet Union, and Velorex in Czechoslovakia.

The Duo was made initially by VEB Fahrzeugbau und Ausrüstungen Brandis (VEB FAB) from 1973 until 1978, whereupon manufacture was transferred to VEB Robur, more famous for making trucks in Zittau. Because many of the components are common with the Simson, the Duo is often classified as a Simson. Production ceased in 1989.

== Since 1988 ==
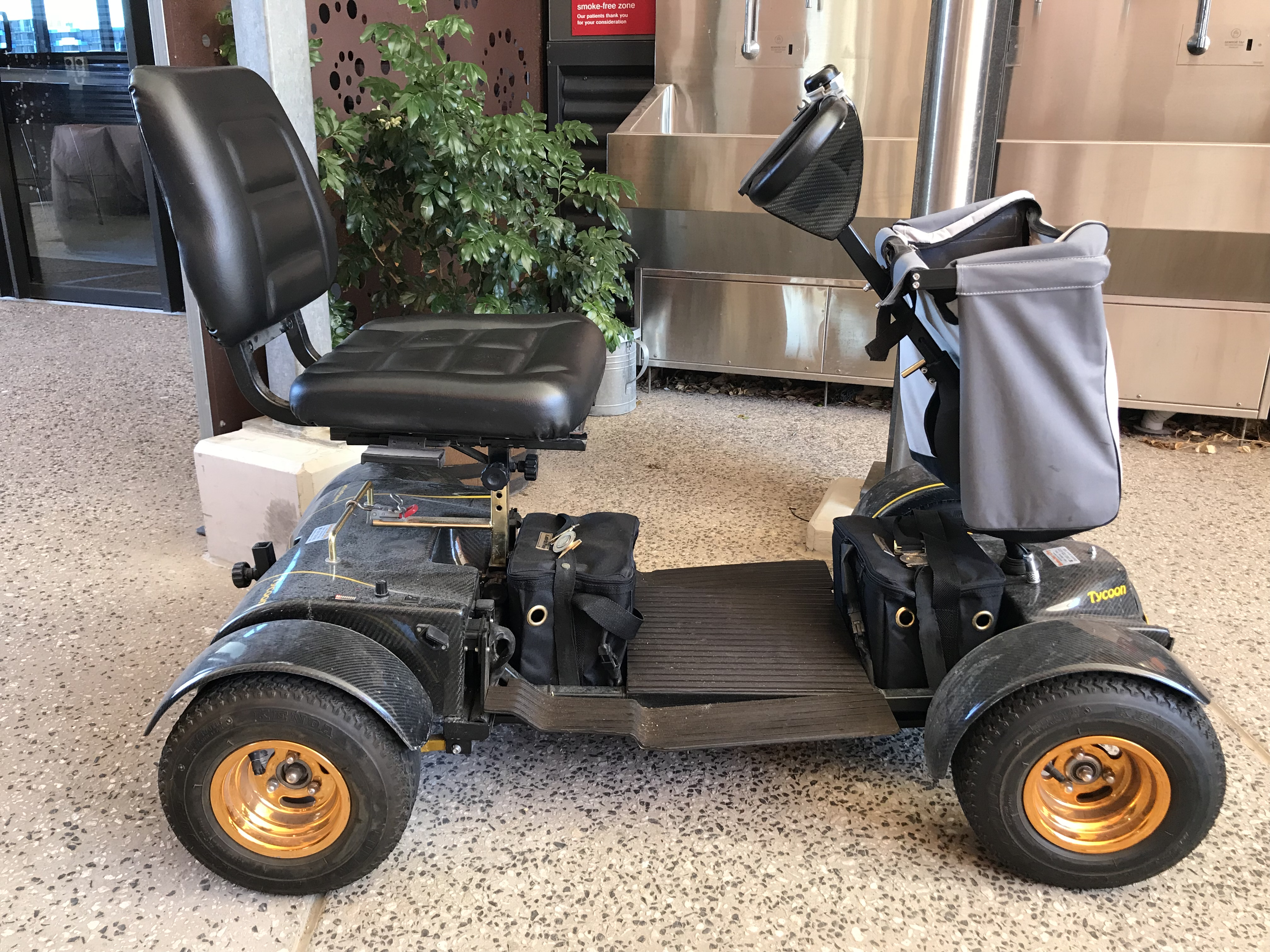
Mobility scooter

In the United Kingdom, "invalid carriage" is a legal term denoting a device built for the use of one person with a physical disability, which does not require a driving licence and may be driven off-road by a disabled person, including on pavements. The law is slightly different in Northern Ireland.

Regulations divide them into three classes:

- Class 1 comprises non-mechanically propelled vehicles, including wheelchairs and handcycles. Users of such vehicles are treated for most purposes in law as pedestrians. They are not subject to any speed limits.
- Class 2 comprises mechanically propelled vehicles such as motorized wheelchairs and mobility scooters, limited to 4 mph (6.4 km/h).
- Class 3 consists mostly of mobility scooters. They are limited to 8 mph (13 km/h), with a further limiter set to 4 mph (6.4 km/h) which must be enabled when used on a pavement. They must be fitted with a speedometer and may not be used by children under 14.

All three classes may be used on footways and cycle paths. Class 2 and 3 may be used on dual carriageways with a flashing amber beacon, and otherwise must comply with most other regulations pertaining to use of vehicles on the carriageway (e.g. lights and reflectors), though they are specifically excluded from the definition of "motor vehicle". All are banned from motorways. None of them cover the types described in the section above, which are ordinary motor vehicles subject to all regulations applicable to such.

== See also ==
- Bath chair
- Cars for wheelchair users
- Handcycle
- Invacar
- Motorized wheelchair
- Mobility scooter

== Literature ==
- An Introduction to the British Invalid Carriage 1850 - 1978, Stuart Cyphus, Museum of Disability History, ISBN 9780984598380
