= Invacar =

Small single-seater vehicle designed for use by disabled drivers

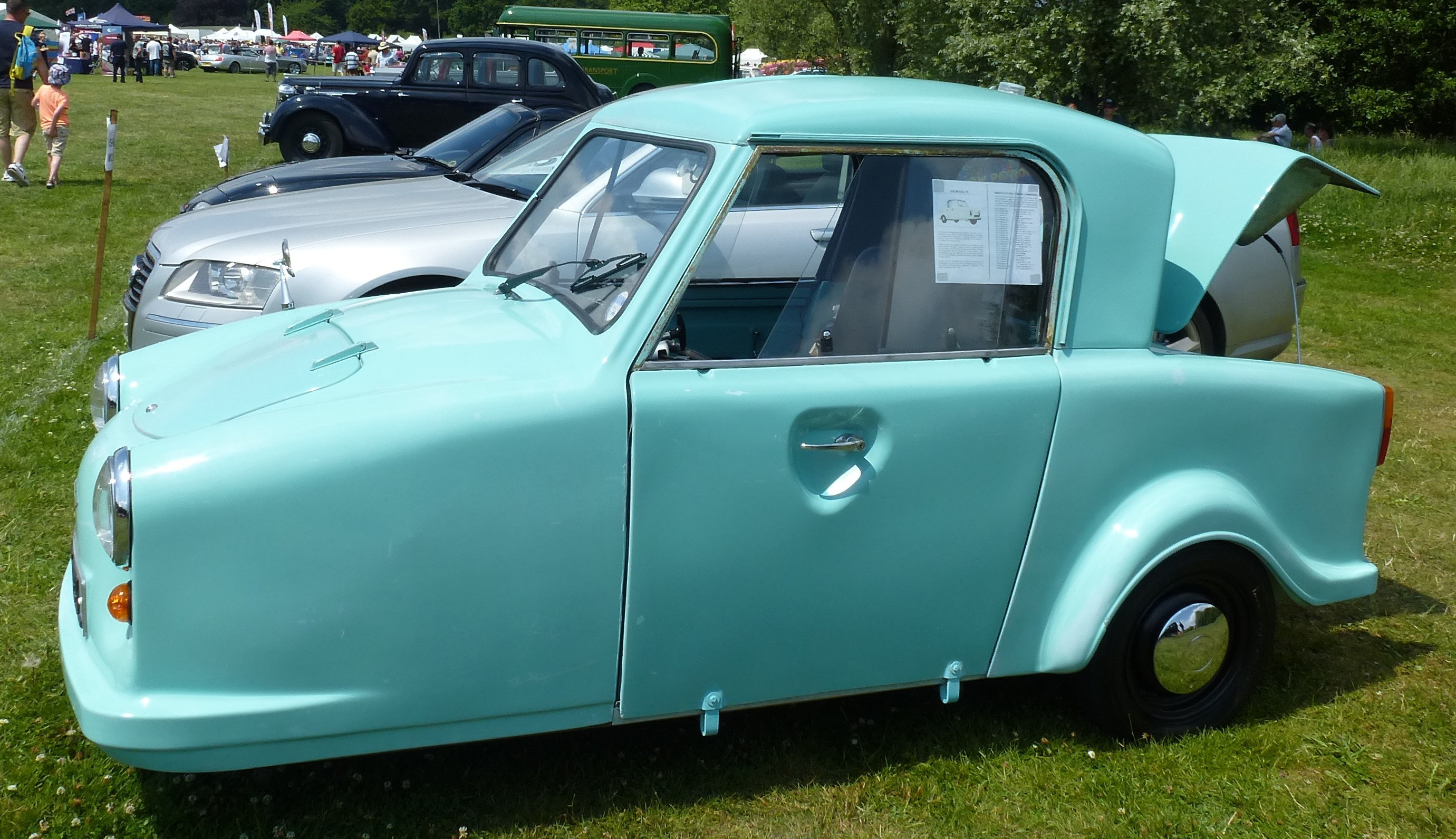
A 1973 Invacar at the Bromley Pageant of Motoring, 2017

The Invacar (abbreviated from "invalid carriage") is a small single-seater microcar vehicle designed for use by disabled drivers, and was distributed free in the UK.

== History ==
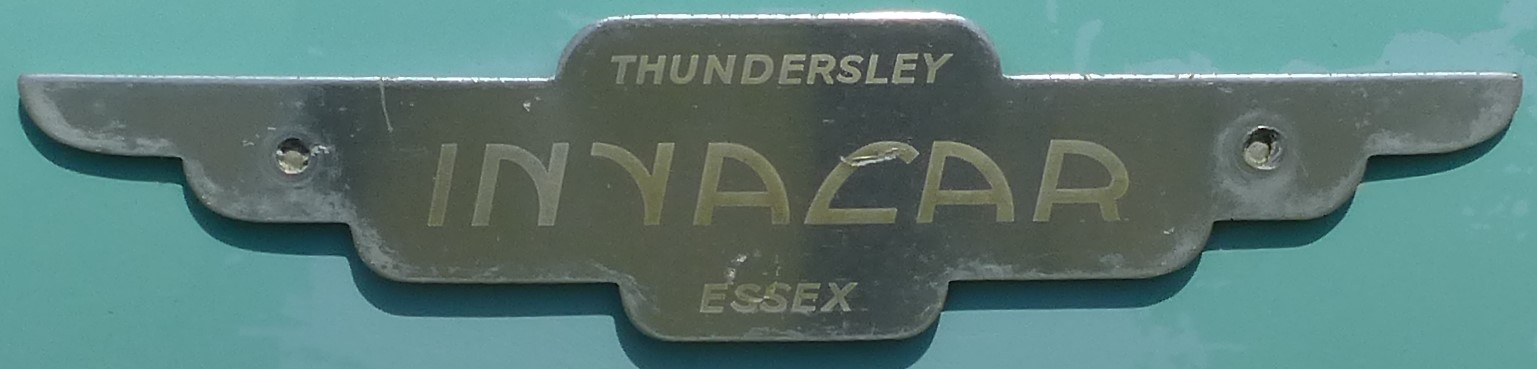
Invacar badge

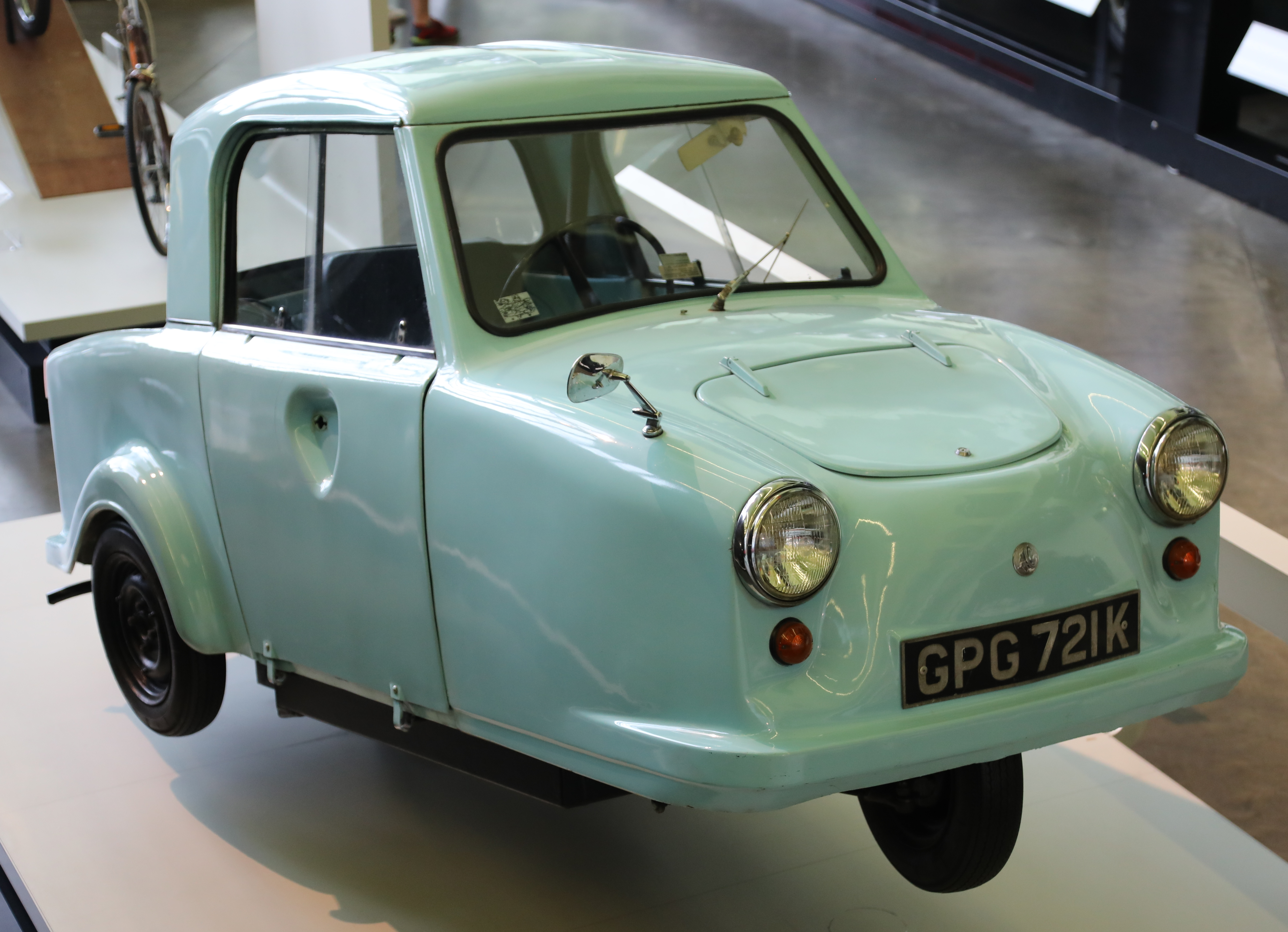
A model 70, displayed at the Riverside Museum, Glasgow, 2019

In 1948, Bert Greeves adapted a motorbike for exclusively manual control with the help of his paralysed cousin, Derry Preston-Cobb, as transport for Preston-Cobb. In the number of former servicemen disabled in the Second World War they spotted a commercial opportunity and approached the UK government for support, leading to the creation of Invacar Ltd. (Note: Invacar was not the only company to be contracted by the Ministry of Health to produce three-wheeled vehicles for disabled drivers. Others included Harding, Dingwall & Son, AC Cars, Barrett, Tippen & Son, Thundersley and Coventry Climax.) The British Ministry of Pensions distributed Invacars free to disabled people from 1948 until the 1970s.

Most early vehicles were powered by an air-cooled Villiers 197 cc engine with Dynastart, but when production of that engine ceased in the early 1970s it was replaced by a more powerful 4-stroke 500 cc or 600 cc Steyr-Puch engine, giving a reported top speed of 82 mph (132 km/h). During the 1960s and 70s the Invacar, with its modern fibreglass shell and ice-blue colouring, nicknamed Ministry Blue after the Ministry of Health, was produced in the tens of thousands. Developments, including an extended wheelbase, widened track and use of Austin Mini wheels, saw the Invacars through to the end of the final DHSS contract in 1977. More than 50 variants were produced. Half of the Invacars were made by AC Cars in Thames Ditton, with the rest made by Invacar Ltd in Thundersley, Essex.

On 31 March 2003, almost all of the remaining Invacars owned by the government were recalled and scrapped because of safety concerns. These included failing crash tests at Mira in 1974, a high accident rate and poor handling test results.

All Invacars were owned by the government and leased to disabled drivers as part of their disability benefit. Their use had been in decline since the introduction of the Motability scheme in the late 1970s, offering disabled drivers a conventional car with modified options. In 2018, it featured in BBC 4 programme The NHS: A People's History with Alex Brooker.

In 2014, Tony Heaton featured a gold painted invacar in a work titled Gold Lamé at DaDaFest.

== See also ==
- Bath chair
- Greeves Motorcycles
- SMZ cyclecar (a similar vehicle in the USSR)
- List of car manufacturers of the United Kingdom
