= List of Greeves motorcycles =

This page lists the motorcycles produced by the British motorcycle manufacturer Greeves Motorcycles Ltd.

Model	Production years	Name	Type
20TA	1958-59	Scottish	Trials
20TAS	1958-59	Scottish Special	Trials
20R	1954-57	Standard	Roadster
20SA	1958-59	Hawkstone	Scrambler
20SAS	1958-60	Hawkstone Special	Scrambler
25SA	1958-59	Hawkstone Twin	Scrambler
24SAS	1959-60	Hawkstone Special	Scrambler
25D	1957-58	Fleetwing	Roadster
32D	1957-58	Fleetmaster	Roadster
25DB	1959-61	Sports Twin	Roadster
24DB	1959-60	Sports Single	Roadster
20TC 24TCS	1960	Scottish	Trials
24SCS	1960	Hawkstone	Scrambler
20SCS	1960-61	Hawkstone	Scrambler
24TDS	1961-62	Scottish	Trials
25DC	1961-64	Sports Twin	Roadster
32DC	1961-64	Sports Twin	Roadster
24DC	1961-63	Sports Single	Roadster
20DC	1963	Sports Single	Roadster
24MCS	1961	Moto-Cross	Scrambler
24TE	1962	Scottish	Trials
24TES	1962	Scottish	Trials
24MDS	1962-65	Moto-Cross	Scrambler
24MD	1962	Moto-Cross	Scrambler
24INT	1961	International	
25DCX	1962-63	Sportsman	Roadster
32DCX	1962-63	Sportsman	Roadster
24INT	1962	International	
24TE	1963	Scottish	Trials
24TES	1963	Scottish	Trials
25DD Mk 1	1963	Essex Twin	Roadster
32DD Mk 1	1963	Essex Twin	Roadster
24RAS	1963	Silverstone Mk 1	Roadster
24ME	1963	Moto-Cross Starmaker	Scrambler
24TES Mk 2	1964	Scottish	Trials
25DD Mk 2	1964-65	Essex Twin (Dk Blue)	Roadster
25DD Mk 2	1964-65	Essex Twin (Lt Blue)	Roadster
24MX1	1964	Challenger	Scrambler
24RBS	1964	Silverstone Mk 2	Roadster
24INT	1964	International	
25DC Mk 2	1965	Sports Twin	Roadster
24TFS	1965	Scottish	Trials
20DC	1964-65	Sports	Roadster
24RCS	1965	Silverstone Mk 3	Racer
24MX2	1965	Challenger	Scrambler
24INT	1965	International	
25DCE	1966	East Coaster	Roadster
25TGS	1966	Anglian	Trials
24MX3A	1966	Challenger	Scrambler
24MX3C	1966	Challenger	Scrambler
24MX3F	1966	Challenger	Scrambler
24MX3G	1966	Challenger	Scrambler
20DCE	1966	East Coaster	Roadster
24RDS	1966	Silverstone Mk 4	Racer
24THSA	1967	Anglian	Trials
24THSB	1967	Anglian	Trials
24MX5A	1967	Challenger	Scrambler
24MX5C	1967	Challenger	Scrambler
36MX4A	1967-68	Challenger	Scrambler
36MX4C	1967-68	Challenger	Scrambler
24RES	1967-68	Silverstone Mk 5	Racer
24TJ	1968	Wessex	Trials
24TJSB	1968	Anglian	Trials
35RFS	1968	Oulton	Racer
24DF	1968	City Patrol Police	Roadster
24MX4	1968	Challenger	Scrambler

== See also ==
- List of Ariel motorcycles
- List of BSA motorcycles
- List of Triumph motorcycles
- List of Norton motorcycles
