= Rayleigh bath chair murder =

1943 homicide in Rayleigh, Essex, England

The Rayleigh bath chair murder was a 1943 incident of patricide in which a disabled man was killed in Rayleigh, Essex, England. An anti-tank grenade had been rigged to his hooded wheelchair, a conveyance known as a bath chair. The victim, Archibald Brown, was known to be abusive to his family. Eric, 19 at the time, confessed to the murder of his 47-year-old father and claimed such abuse as his motive. The son was declared insane at trial and incarcerated until 1975.

== Incident ==
At 1:45 pm on Friday 23 July 1943 nurse Doris Irene Mitchell went to the air-raid shelter where Brown's bath chair was kept. She found that the door was locked from the inside and upon returning with Mrs Brown they met Eric Brown, then aged 19, coming out. Eric was irritated and evasive. Both women took the wheeled chair to the house and helped Archibald to get in. Brown was dressed in pyjamas and a dressing gown and was covered with a plaid travelling rug. Mitchell took Archibald Brown out of the house. After walking for about a mile, Brown had shifted his weight apparently while feeling for a cigarette in his pocket. Mitchell, having stopped to light the cigarette returned to the back of the chair and pushed it forward. Within half a dozen paces there was a violent explosion. Mitchell sustained leg injuries and as far as she could see Brown and his bath chair had completely disappeared. The police found portions of the body at the side of the road and in nearby trees and gardens.

== Investigation ==
Enemy action was soon ruled out as the cause of the explosion. Experts found the cause to be a British Hawkins grenade – a type of anti-tank mine that is detonated when an acid-filled glass ampoule is broken. The device had been placed under the bath chair's cushion. A formal murder investigation was begun. Doris Brown was interviewed at length at Rayleigh police station. It emerged that although Archibald Brown had been disabled and unable to walk, his will power was undiminished: he harshly ruled his wife and elder son. His wife was not allowed to visit her mother in nearby Rochford and Archibald Brown would constantly ring a bell to get his wife's attention, even if he perceived that a single flower was out of place in a vase. Eric Brown was constantly beaten and humiliated. Doris Brown stated that her husband had increasingly appeared to take a dislike to her. Eric, too, had noticed the deterioration in Archibald's behaviour, but he had taken a liking to his new nurse and their walks together.

== Arrest and trial ==
The blame fell on Eric Brown. He had previously attended lectures on the same mine used in the murder, and, having joined the British Army some years previously, had access to a weapons store in Spilsby. Eventually Eric Brown gave a confession in which he blamed his actions on Archibald Brown's abusive attitude to both him and his mother. On 21 September 1943 he was committed to trial at the Essex Assizes. The trial started on 4 November; Eric Brown was tried at the Shire Hall, Chelmsford and declared insane. He was released in 1975.

== See also ==
- Patricide
- Land mine
- Insanity defense

== Additional sources ==
- Gordon, Dee (November 2007). Foul Deeds & Suspicious Deaths In & Around Southend-on-Sea. Wharncliffe Books. ISBN 978-1-84563-047-8.
