= Larmar Engineering =

Defunct English motor vehicle manufacturer

Larmar Engineering Company Limited is a British engineering company and former manufacturer of automobiles.

== Company History ==
Mr. Larcombe founded the company in Margaretting in 1919. On July 9, 1942, it became a Limited company. In the summer of 1946, the production of automobiles began with the brand name of Larmar. In 1951, the production ended.

== Vehicles ==
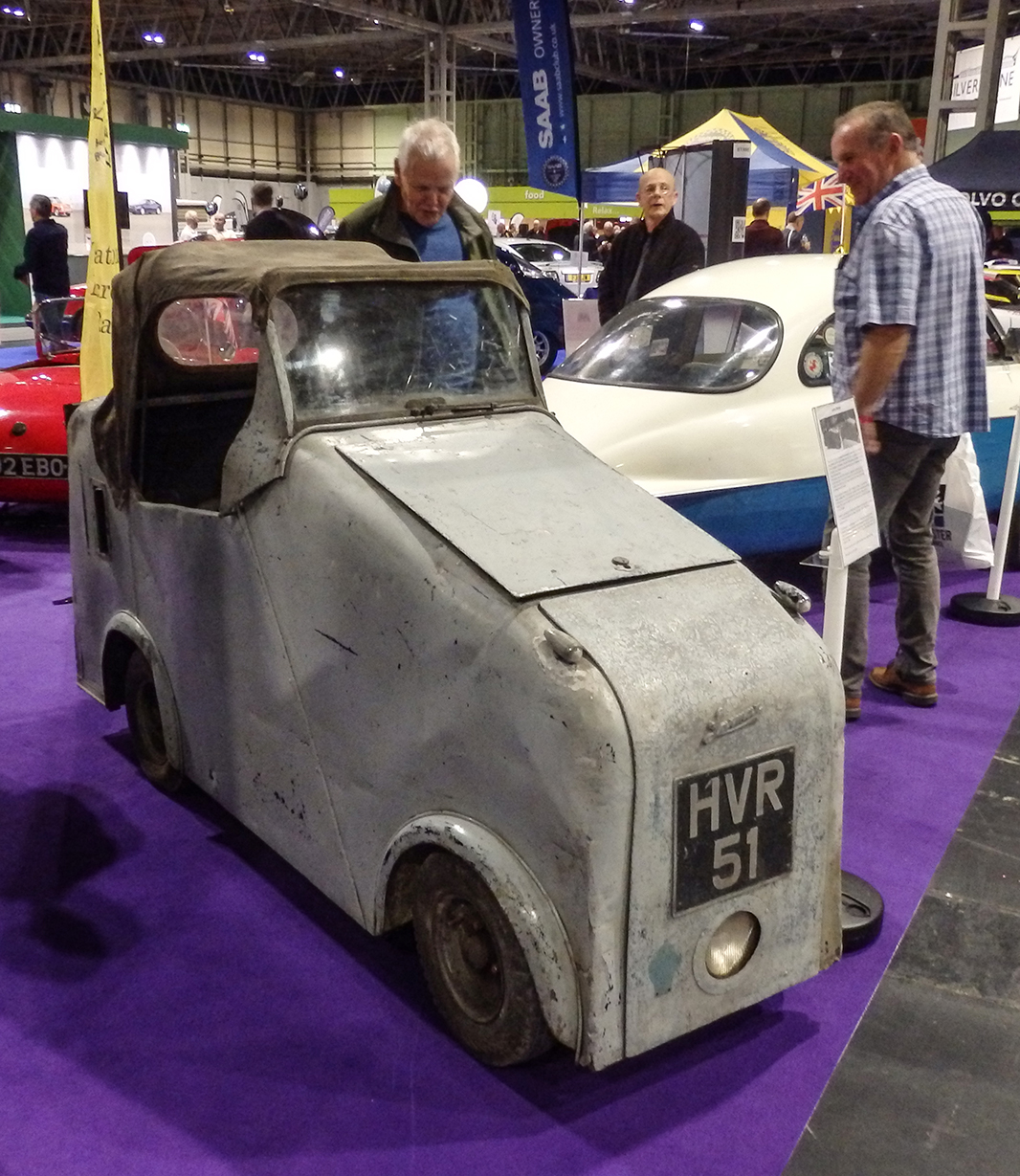
Larmar microcar at the NEC show in Birmingham in 2022.

On offer were small cars that were specially designed for the physically disabled. The vehicle was only 80cm wide. Its body was made of plywood and aluminum. It had a side door, a seat, windshield and soft top. A single-cylinder two-stroke engine from BSA with 249 cc displacement and 8hp was mounted in the rear and drove one of the rear wheels via a chain. From 1950, a two-cylinder four-stroke engine with 350 cc displacement and 10hp was available. An example is currently held in the Lane Motor Museum, Nashville.

Another unrestored (but running) example is held by The Great British Car Journey museum, Matlock, UK.

Larcombe also produced a small open truck vehicle called the Lorret. This had an engine with a displacement of 490cm^{3}. It appears no examples have survived.

== Literature ==
- Harald H. Linz, Halwart Schrader: Die Internationale Automobil-Enzyklopädie. United Soft Media Verlag, Munich 2008, ISBN 978-3-8032-9876-8.
- George Nick Georgano (Editor-in-Chief): The Beaulieu Encyclopedia of the Automobile. Volume 2: G–O. Fitzroy Dearborn Publishers, Chicago 2001, ISBN 1-57958-293-1. (English)
