= Greeves (motorcycles) =

British motorcycle manufacturer

Greeves Motorcycles Ltd
- Type: Private
- Founded: 1951, reformed May 1999
- Headquarters: Thundersley, Essex; Sandon, Chelmsford, United Kingdom
- Key people: Bert Greeves; Derry Preston-Cobb; Richard Deal
- Products: Motorcycles
- Website: Greeves Motorcycles Ltd

Greeves Motorcycles was a British motorcycle manufacturer founded by Bert Greeves which produced a range of road machines, and later competition mounts for observed trials, scrambles and road racing. The original company produced motorcycles from 1952, funded by a contract with the Ministry of Pensions for their Invacar, a three-wheeler for disabled drivers.

After many wins in motorcycle trials competitions and developing a successful US export market, the original company ceased trading following a fire in 1977. Richard Deal bought the rights to the Greeves name in May 1999. The new business continues to develop motorcycles and launched the first new Greeves trials bike for 20 years in January 2009, with an all-new British two-stroke 280 cc engine.

== History ==
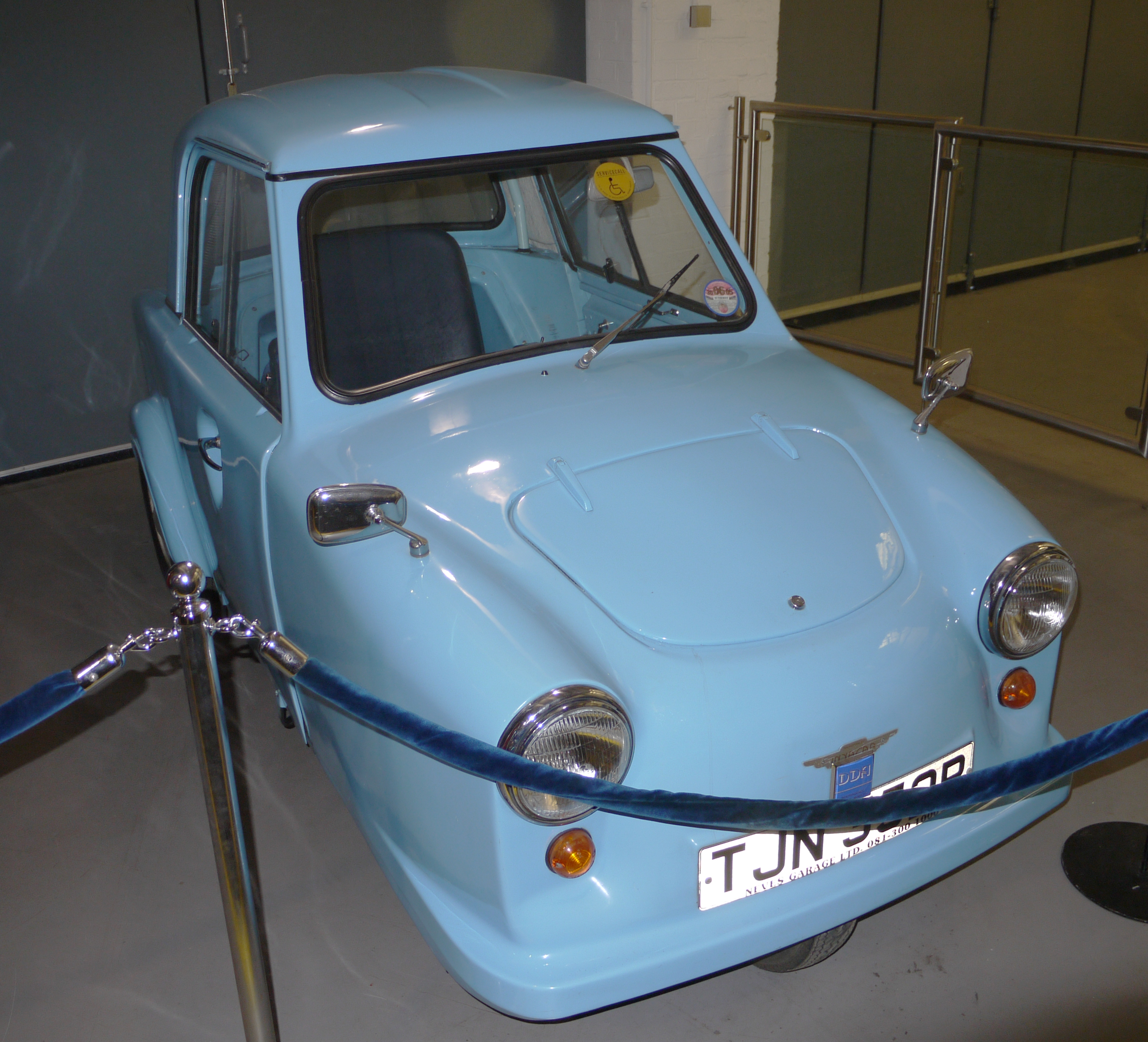
Invacar model 70

The original company founded by Bert Greeves MBE was the Invacar company. Greeves was mowing the lawns of his home in Worcestershire when he had the idea of fitting the lawnmower engine to his disabled cousin's wheelchair and invented the Invacar. Invacar Ltd was set up and won a major contract to provide motorised three-wheeled invalid carriage vehicles to the UK Government Ministry of Pensions and National Insurance. in 1952 from a small factory in Church Road, Thundersley not far from Southend-on-Sea in Essex.

Encouraged by this success, Bert Greeves decided to diversify into motorcycle manufacture. A keen trials rider in his spare time, he had started collecting veteran and vintage motorcycles, including a 1912 Triumph with the registration 'OLD 1'. His disabled cousin Derry Preston-Cobb also encouraged him to start the motorcycle business. Derry's own Invacar was used as a promotional vehicle and had been fitted with a more powerful engine, which used to amaze other drivers as he overtook them on the Southend roads. Working together they developed a prototype using a two-stroke 197 cubic centimetres (12.0 cu in) single-cylinder engine sourced from Villiers Engineering – and a Greeves badge on the fuel tank. The motorcycles were really a sideline for the main business of producing the three-wheeled invalid cars, so development of the prototypes had to be fitted in when the production schedule allowed. Bert had been an enthusiastic motorcyclist in his youth and always had an ambition to become a motorcycle manufacturer. The first Greeves motorcycle was developed in mid-1951, using rubber-in-torsion springing at both front and rear. His unconventional rubber springing came straight from the patented system used for the invalid car. Rear wheel suspension was by a pivoted fork with rods connecting to torsion rubber mounted units just below the seat. Friction dampers were also fitted which could be manually adjusted. The front forks were also unusual, with short leading links to carry the wheel, pivoting on rubber-in-torsion spring units (later known as the 'Banana Leading Link' front fork. Motorcycle production began in the autumn of 1953 and the new models featured a unique frame with the steering head and a massive front down member combined in a large 'I-section' cast alloy beam, cast in a new light-alloy foundry that had been added to the Greeves factory. The tubular frame member was inserted into a mould and the main frame was cast around it, making for a very strong frame. Made from LM6 silicon-aluminium alloy, it was claimed to be stronger than tubular steel and proved capable of standing up to the rough treatment of international off-road trials competition. Protection was finished off with reinforced engine cradle plates which were also light alloy castings.

Derry Preston-Cobb was made Sales Manager for the motorcycle business and they started with three models, a scrambler, a three speed road bike and a four-speed version. At the 1954 Earls Court Show, they also launched the 'Fleetwing', a two-cylinder two-stroke with a 242 cc British Anzani engine developed from those used for motor boats and featuring a crankshaft with a hollow midsection that acted as a rotary inlet valve. With a top speed of just 61 mph (98 km/h), the Fleetwing continued in production until 1956 when the stock of British Anzani engines was finally exhausted. The Fleetwing name was brought back in 1957, however, for the Villiers engined 249 cubic centimetres (15.2 cu in) model. This was more powerful than the earlier Fleetwing and now had a more respectable top speed of 70 miles per hour (110 km/h). Gearboxes were supplied by Albion Engineering Co. of Birmingham, later replaced by their own designs from 1964 forward. The lightweight high powered package made them successful in the trials market place against Triumph and BSA models.

By 1962 there were eleven models in the Greeves range. The offroad motorcycles were also developed through an association with Queen's University Belfast producing the later Greeves QUB model. The last of the Challenger models was produced in 1968, replaced by the 250 and 380 cc Griffon motocrossers in 1969. The original leading link fork was no longer fitted, having been replaced by standard telescopic forks as the leading link design could not match the travel of forks. Also abandoned was the original cast alloy front down beam, replaced with a new frame of Reynolds 531 chrome molybdenum with a conventional down tube.

Greeves also built a successful export business and at one time most of the motorcycles produced were going to the United States. Greeves became so successful in the US that they had a significant influence on the growth of the off-road biking sport and with the invention of the trail bike with their road legal off-roader, the Ranger. In 2025 Gary Bamford t/a Classic Bikes 1970 of Gloucester obtained the rights to the original Thundersley built Greeves from Richard Deal. Gary supplies spares and service to classic Greeves bikes.

== Competition success ==
It was off-road competition that was to dominate Greeves production, and in 1956 Greeves signed motocross rider Brian Stonebridge and started competing in the European Motocross Championship. Stonebridge became the company Competitions Manager and Development Engineer, as he was a skilled two-stroke tuning specialist and was able to significantly improve the performance of the Villiers engines. In April 1957 Brian Stonebridge managed to beat the 500 cc bikes on the much smaller capacity Greeves round the demanding and hilly Hawkstone Park course, winning the 350 cc race and coming second in the 500 cc race, establishing Greeves' reputation as true off-road competition motorcycles. The next Greeves model was called the 'Hawkstone'; to capitalise on this success and the company began to specialise in motocross motorcycles, ridden by champions including Peter Hammond, Jack Simpson and Norman Sloper.

Stonebridge led a three-man Greeves team to the West German International Six Days Trial event in 1958 and had a faultless ride, winning another gold medal. In October 1959, tragedy struck the Greeves team when Brian Stonebridge was killed in a car accident. Bert Greeves was at the wheel and Stonebridge was in the passenger seat when they crashed returning from a visit to a factory in Bradford. In a head-on collision Bert was only slightly injured but in the days before seat belts it proved fatal for Brian, who died at the scene of the accident.

After the death of Stonebridge, Greeves signed Dave Bickers, who won the 1960 and 1961 250 cc championship. The company went on to win the Manx Grand Prix, the Scott Trial, the European Trials Championship and the Scottish Six Days Trial, winning gold medals in the ISDT and the ACU 250 cc Road Race. Bert Greeves also managed to sign up Bill Wilkinson, the Yorkshire trials rider who made the headlines when he won the British Experts Trail competition in 1960, the first time it had ever been won on a two-stroke motorcycle and a significant result for the Greeves factory.

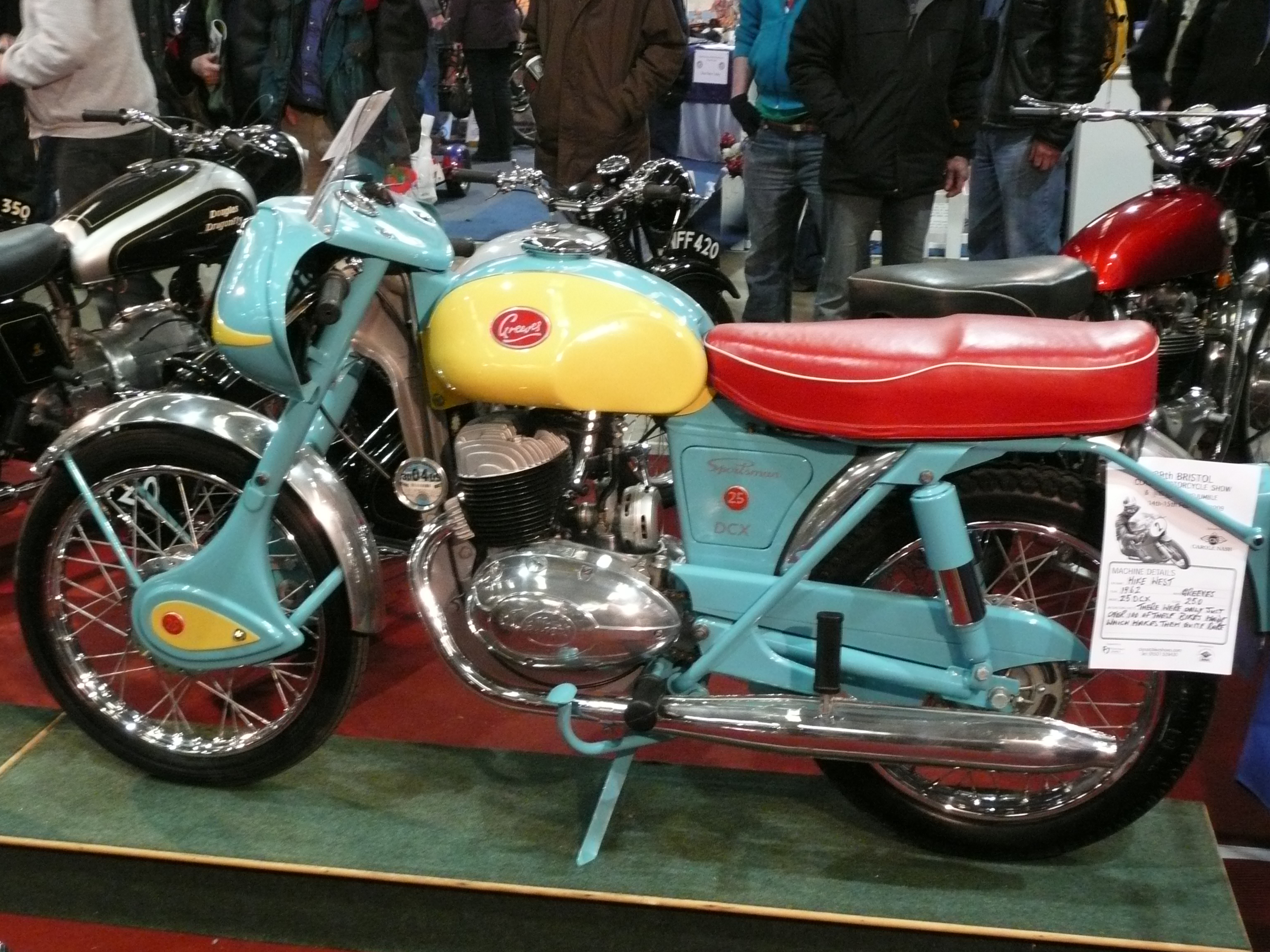
Greeves 250DCX Sportsman 1962

In 1963 the Greeves range still included the 25DC Sports Twin and two new models with the latest glass fibre tanks and handlebar fairings, as well as plastic mudguards. These were the 25DD 'Essex' and the 250 DCX 'Sportsman'. The same year the Greeves factory was asked to provide the motorcycles for the British ISDT team. This was significant because the team had previously relied on four-stroke vertical twins. Greeves produced three special machines for the event, which was held in the Czechoslovak mountains. The engines were highly modified Villiers MK 36A but instead of the standard Villiers crankshaft they had an Alpha assembly and the squared-off cylinder barrels and heads were cast in Bert Greeves' own foundry and painted with matt black heat-dispersing paint. Although one of the riders, Triss Sharp, had starting problems, his brother Brian Sharp and the third rider Peter Stirland both won gold medals. The only woman to compete in the event, Mary Driver, was also riding a Greeves machine and won a bronze medal.

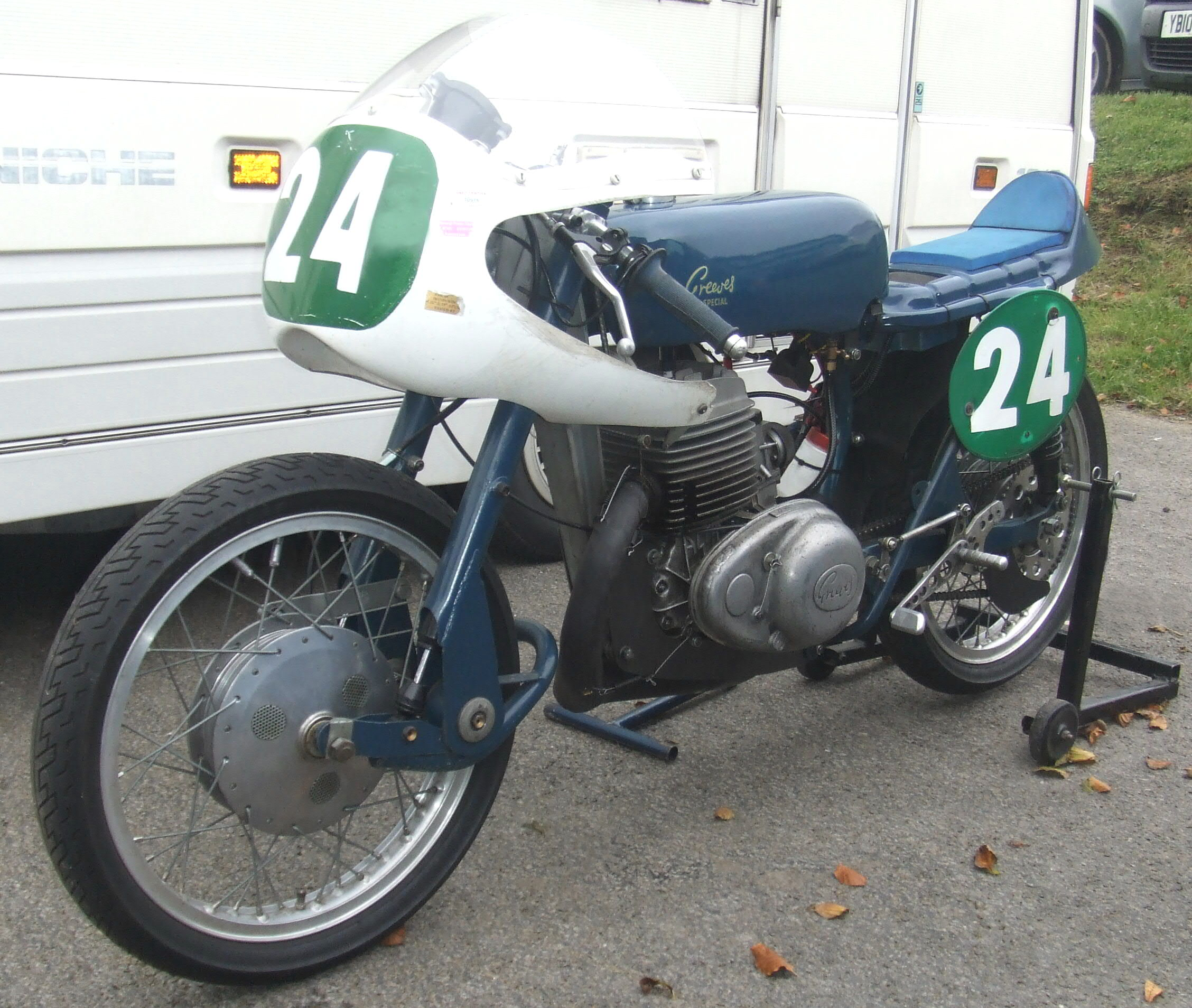
Greeves Silverstone 250 cc, mid 1960s style with correct-appearance top half fairing at a Classic meeting, Cadwell Park, Lincolnshire, England in 2010

Greeves also made a successful entry into road racing with the 250 cc Silverstone model. These were a production Clubman's model with a reputation for reliability and were chosen to be the standard motorcycles for the Mortimer-Beart Road Racing School. When winning the 1964 Manx Grand Prix, London-based Rhodesian Gordon Keith also took the Greeves racer to the fastest lap of the race – his last of the four-lap race – at 87.6 miles per hour (141.0 km/h), which proved to be the best speed ever by a British 250 cc motorcycle, with a race-average of 86.19 miles per hour (138.71 km/h). From the next five places, four were Aermacchis.

Peter Inchley on the Villiers Starmaker Special in 1966 lapped The Island at 93.17 mph, the only Brish 250 to lap at over 90, completing the 250 race at over 90 mph, finishing 3rd. This was a Cotton frame, a highly developed Starmaker engine and Bultaco forks. As well as a boost for the Greeves factory, this was an important win when the sport was beginning to become dominated by foreign motorcycles. This led to a lot of interest in the Greeves road bikes, including from a number of British Police forces for a version of the bigger twin equipped with a radio.

Also in 1964 Greeves launched the 'Challenger', and first time out ridden by Garth Wheldon it won the Terry Cups Trail. In 1967, a 346 cubic centimetres (21.1 cu in) version of the successful Challenger was launched, together with a road racer, a 350 cc version of the Silverstone, called the 'Oulton'. A special export model called the 'Ranger' was also developed but by 1968 Villiers had pulled out of engine production and Greeves decided to leave the trail-motorcycle market to concentrate on the development of a motocross model.

== End of an era ==
As the Japanese entered the market place, with Suzuki dominating the European Championships from 1970 to 1973, sales began to slow. Greeves received an important order to supply motorcycles for the Royal Artillery Motorcycle Display Team and developed the 'Greeves Griffons', but a change in the law meant that the Invacar, which had been the mainstay of the company (even at the peak of motorcycle production Bert Greeves still answered the telephone as "Invacar Limited") was no longer legal for road use so the Ministry of Pensions decided to replace it with a four-wheeled car. Bert Greeves decided that it was time to retire from the business and was soon followed by his cousin Derry Preston-Cobb. The company floundered in 1976 and after a fire at the factory were unable to resume production, resulting in receivership. The last civilian Greeves road bikes were produced in 1966 these being the 25DCMk2 'East Coaster' and the 20DC 'Sports' single in black, but in 1968 the company produced a batch of 19 24DF police bikes with 250cc Villiers single cylinder engines, 15 for the Staffordshire County Police and 4 for the City of London police

== New Greeves ==
The old Greeves motorcycles were ideal for the new "classic" (twinshock) class of trials but parts were scarce and expensive, so trials rider Richard Deal started producing replica parts, and then a replica motorcycle called the Anglian. In May 1999, after gaining control of the trademarks of the Greeves name in the UK, USA and Europe, a new Greeves company was founded in Chelmsford which restarted production of mainly trials models. The new company started building and rebuilding Greeves motorcycles from 2000 and established a replacement parts division. Continuing a tradition started by Bert Greeves, the heads, barrels, crankcases, and aluminium frame beams were manufactured from new castings produced in a specialist alloy foundry.

=== The new 280 cc ===
By 2009, the company had built 22 Greeves Anglian motorcycles, four Greeves Pathfinders, and had completed some restoration projects. In 2007 a decision was made to develop the first completely new Greeves trials motorcycle for over 20 years. Working with the students at DeMontfort University in Leicester, Greeves engineers consulted with participants involved in the Rapid Product Development MSc project to design and develop a completely new 280 cc (17 cu in) displacement lightweight two-stroke engine. To enable existing components to be used in the new engine, parts were scanned using the centre's Renishaw Cyclone Reverse Engineering machine. Rapid prototyping models of the new engine were then manufactured on the centre's 3D printing machine to check the fit before manufacture of prototype cast metal parts.

GPD Developments, a foundry in Nuneaton, Warwickshire manufactured castings using a new method of printing sand moulds directly from computer-aided design (CAD) data. Prototype sand moulds used this new technique to cast prototype parts. After six thousand hours of design, further development and testing, Greeves launched the 280 cc Trials bike at the Classic Off-Road show at Telford in 2009. The 280 specification included Marzocchi aluminium forks, Dellorto carburettor, the fuel tank located close to the rear wheel to reduce the centre of gravity, and a single shock absorber mounted centrally on the swinging arm. The frame, headstock, swinging arm, footrest hangars and engine components used 6063 aerospace-quality aluminium.

In May 2025 the following statement was agreed and subsequently released by Greeves Motorcycles Ltd and British Bikes 1970: Greeves Motorcycles Limited has sold all its interests, goodwill, and intellectual property rights in classic VILLIERS and GREEVES motorcycles, parts, components and spares to BRITHUBS LIMITED trading as BRITISH BIKES 1970.

BRITISH BIKES 1970 is now the EXCLUSIVE LICENCEE for the GREEVES UK trademark under registration no.: UK00901956317.

Greeves Motorcycles Limited will no longer deal in classic GREEVES motorcycles or motorcycle parts, components, or spares, or restoration services.

For all sales, maintenance, service, and restoration enquiries for Classic Greeves Motorcycles, please contact Gary Bamford at www.britishbikes1970.com "

== See also ==
- List of Greeves motorcycles
