= Bert Greeves =

British engineer (1906–1993)

- Greeves sitting on a then-new version for 1965 of the Greeves Anglian 250 cc trials bike, 24 pounds (11 kg) lighter and with a new design front fork
- Born: 5 June 1906; Lyon, France
- Died: 15 July 1993 (aged 87); Southend-on-Sea, Essex, United Kingdom
- Occupations: Motorcycle designer and manufacturer
- Children: Jenny Kay Williams

Bert Greeves MBE (born Oscar Bertram Greeves, 5 June 1906 – 15 July 1993) was a British engineer who founded Invacar Ltd in 1942 and Greeves motor cycles in 1953.

== Early life ==
Greeves was born in Lyon, France in 1906 to English parents. His first job was as an engineering apprentice with the Austin Motor Company at their factory in at Longbridge, near Birmingham before setting up his own garage business in London. It was there that he built his first powered wheelchair for his disabled cousin, Derry Preston-Cobb, using an engine from a lawnmower. He developed it into a commercially viable vehicle and founded the Invacar Ltd in 1946 and won a major contract with the Ministry of Pensions for national supply of transport for the physically disabled throughout the 1950s and 1960s.

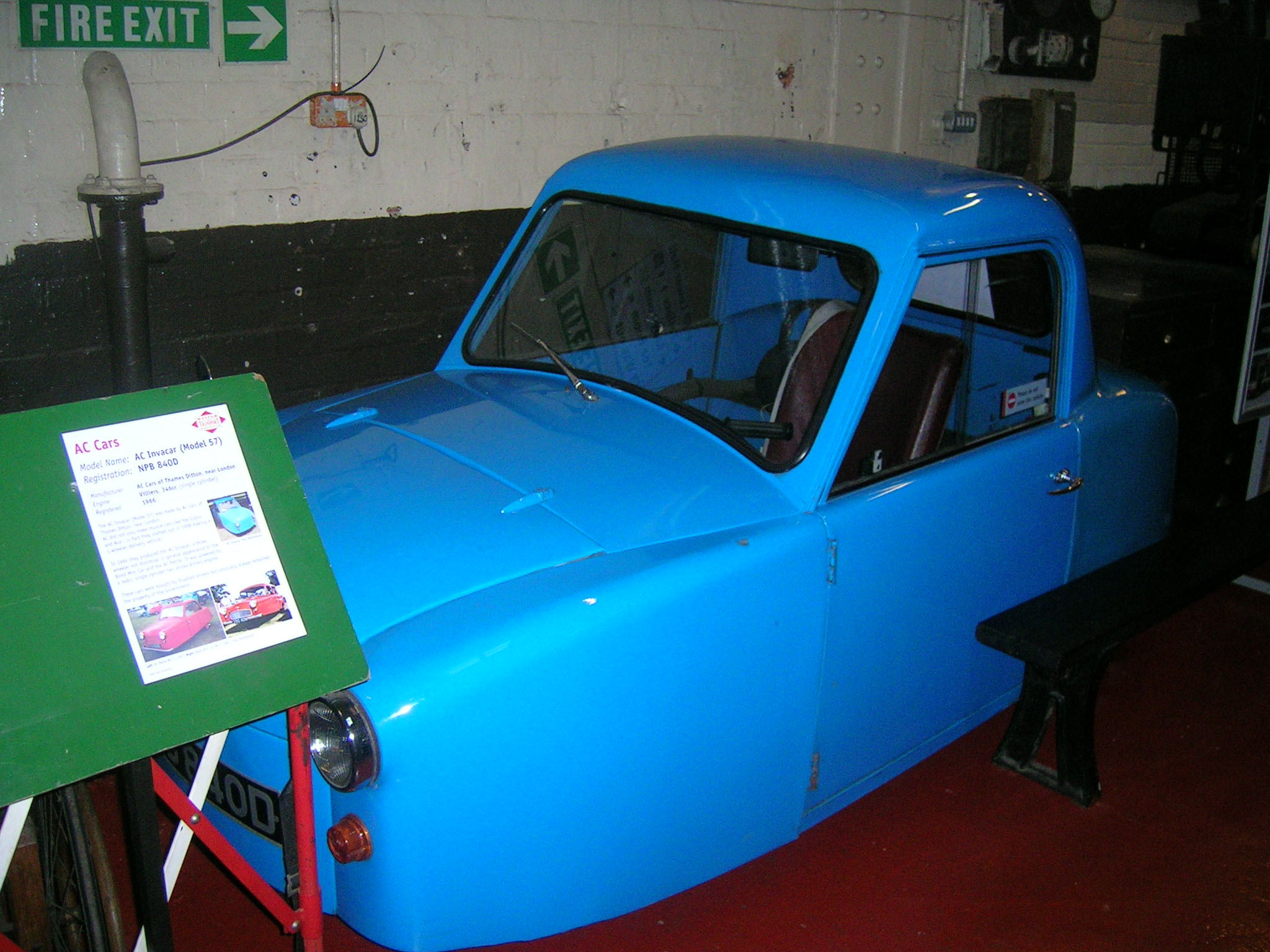
The original 1957 Invacar

Encouraged by this success, Greeves decided to diversify into motorcycle manufacture and set up Greeves motor cycles in 1953. A keen trials rider in his spare time, he had started collecting veteran and vintage motorcycles, including a 1912 Triumph with the registration 'OLD 1'. Preston-Cobb also encouraged him to start the motorcycle business. Working together they developed a prototype using a 2-stroke 197cc single-cylinder engine sourced from Villiers Engineering - and a Greeves badge on the fuel tank. The motorcycles were really a sideline for the main business of producing the three-wheeled invalid cars, so development of the prototypes had to be fitted in when the production schedule allowed. The first Greeves motorcycle was developed in 1951 and featured a massive front down member combined in a large 'I-section' cast alloy beam, cast in a new light-alloy foundry that had been added to the Greeves factory. The tubular frame member was inserted into a mould and the main frame was cast around it, making for a very strong frame. Made from LM6 silicon-aluminium alloy, it was claimed to be stronger than tubular steel and proved capable of standing up to the rough treatment of international off-road trials competition. Protection was finished off with reinforced engine cradle plates which were also light alloy castings.

== Later life ==
The Greeves range of motorbikes, with small but powerful engines and light strong frames proved very successful in competition, beating the bigger factories heavier and larger capacity motorcycles. Greeves was successful in winning an important order to supply the Royal Artillery Motorcycle Display Team with motorcycles and developed the "Greeves Griffon".

A change in the safety legislation meant the end of the Invacar, which had been the mainstay of the company (even at the peak of motorcycle production. Greeves still answered the telephone as "Invacar Limited") Greeves decided that it was time to retire from the business and he was soon followed by his cousin Derry Preston-Cobb. The company floundered in 1976 and after a fire at the factory were unable to resume production and went into receivership.

Greeves married twice, and had one daughter. He died on 15 July 1993.

== Honours ==
Greeves was appointed Member of the Order of the British Empire (MBE) in the 1972 New Year Honours, in recognition of the work he had done for the disabled through Invacar.
