= Bath chair =

Mobility aid

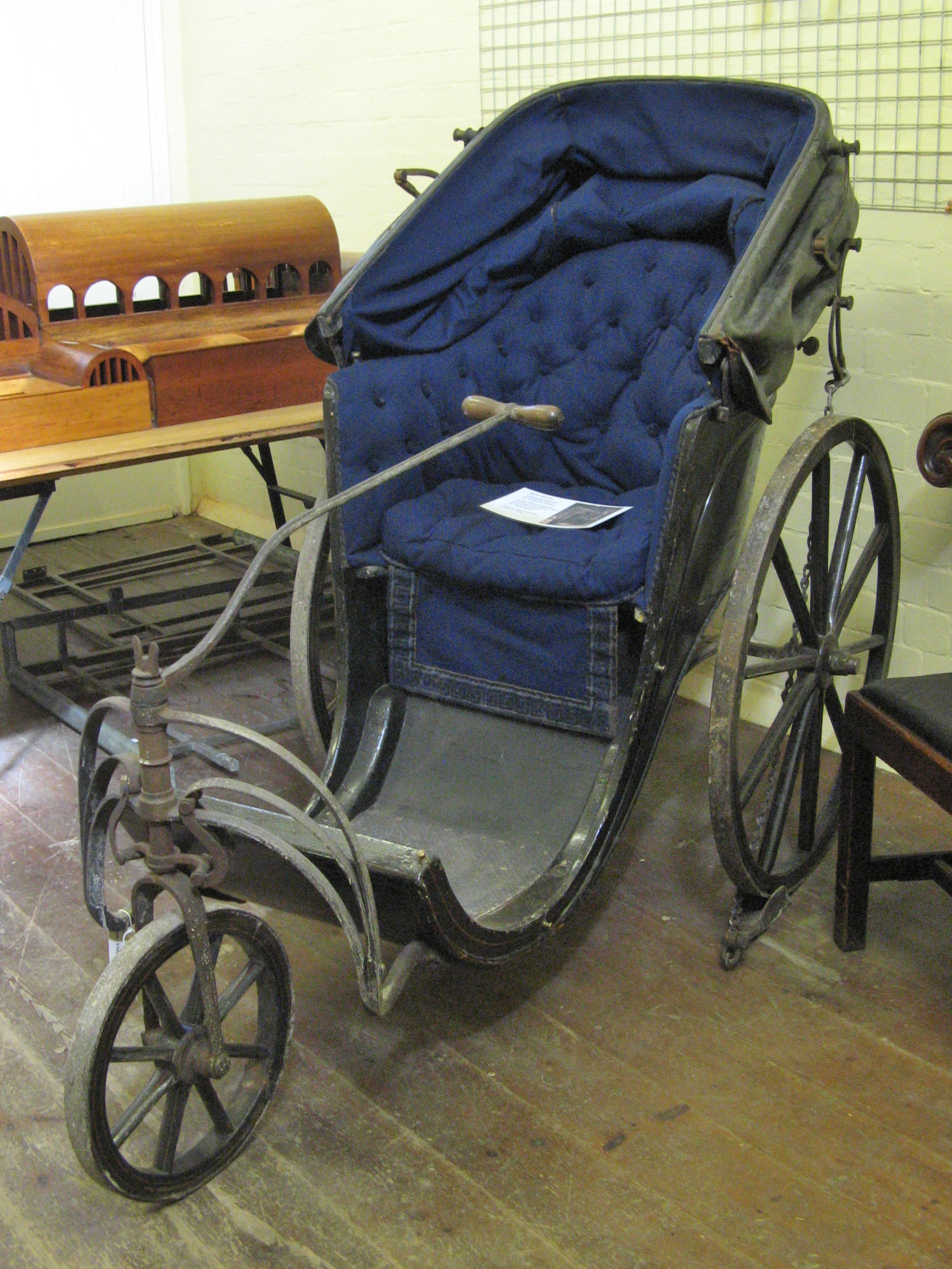
Bath chair

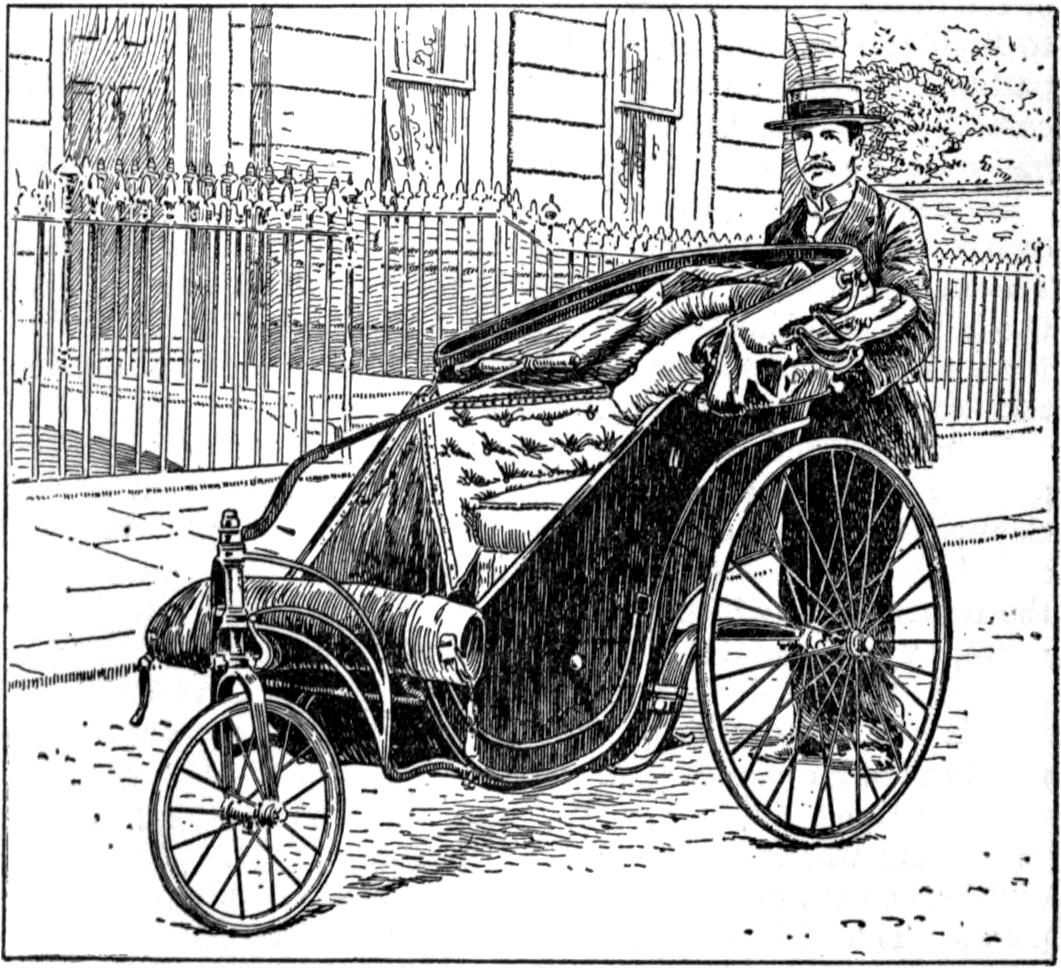
Bath chair

A bath chair—or Bath chair—was a rolling chaise or light carriage for one person with a folding hood, which could be open or closed. Used especially by disabled persons, it was mounted on three or four wheels and drawn or pushed by hand. It is so named from its origin in Bath, England.

If required, the chair could also be mounted on four wheels and drawn by a horse, donkey or small pony with the usual turning arrangement. These animal-drawn versions were the forerunners of the invalid carriage. James Heath, of Bath, who flourished before the middle of the 18th century, was the inventor of the bath chair, where bathing in the Roman Baths or visiting the nearby Pump Room was popular amongst sick visitors.

In the United States, rolling chairs, as they were known, were especially popular on the Atlantic City boardwalk in New Jersey between the late 19th century and the 1960s and 70s. These were often owned by hotels in the city; by the 1920s, it was estimated that over 3,000 were in operation.

Later versions were a type of wheelchair which is pushed by an attendant rather than pulled by an animal. In the 19th century they were often seen at spa resorts such as Buxton, Harrogate, and Tunbridge Wells. Some versions incorporated a steering device that could be operated by the person in the chair.

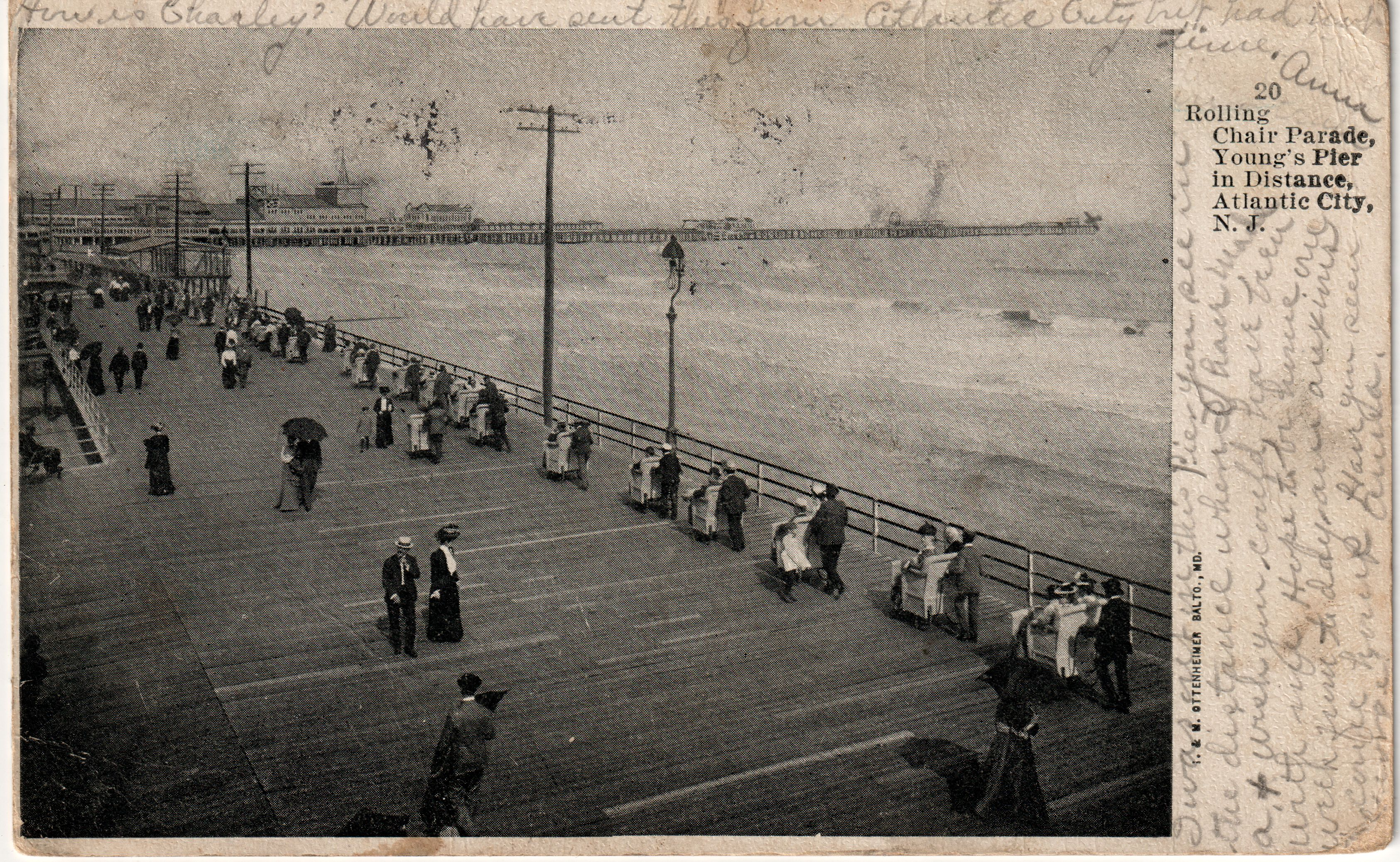
Rolling chair parade in Atlantic City, about 1907

== See also ==
- Bathing machine
- Cycle rickshaw
- Invalid carriage
- Litter (vehicle)
- Rayleigh bath chair murder
- Wheelchair
