= Bianca Raffaella =

British artist, activist and public speaker (born 1992)

- Born: 1992 (age 33–34); London, England
- Education: Kingston University London (2013–16)
- Known for: Painting
- Notable work: In the Rose Garden (2022)
- Website: biancaraffaella.com

Bianca Raffaella (born 1992) is a British artist, activist and public speaker.

== Life and work ==
Raffaella is registered blind and known for 'tactile painting' along with her use of 'soft colours, dusty shadows, and smooth empty spaces which symbolise vision loss'; described by Jonathan Jones in The Guardian as 'ethereally beautiful works'. Her work explores themes of memory, perception, and fragility.

The first registered blind student to graduate from Kingston University with a First class degree in the visual arts. Invited lecturer and collaborator at Institut Français de la Mode. Selected by Tracey Emin for the inaugural Tracey Emin Artist Residency (2023–24) at TKE Studios, Margate. Named one of Three To Watch, Hotly tipped female talent of the British art scene by Harper's Bazaar in their annual art supplement.

In November 2024 Flowers Gallery announced representation of Bianca Raffaella along with her first major solo exhibition, Faint Memories in February 2025.

== Exhibitions ==
=== Solo ===
- 12 January 2023 – 5 March 2023: Hushed Impressions, Orleans House Gallery, London A multi-sensory exhibition focused on accessibility in the visual arts.
- 24 June 2024 – 24 June 2024: Artist of the Day, Flowers Gallery, Cork Street, London Selected by Tracey Emin.
- 12 February 2025 – 15 March 2025: Faint Memories, Flowers Gallery, Cork Street, London

=== Group ===
- 22 September 2021 – 2 January 2022: Summer Exhibition, Royal Academy of Arts, London. Coordinated by Yinka Shonibare, under his theme of 'Reclaiming Magic'.
- 6 November 2021 – 21 November 2021: Breaking Ground, Orleans House Gallery, London Coinciding with Richmond Literature Festival.
- 21 November 2022 – 16 December 2022: Layers of Vision, Bush House, London In collaboration with King's College London, Shape Arts and AccessArt. Coinciding with UK Disability History Month.
- 18 November 2023 – 28 January 2024: TEARS, TKE Studios, Margate Inaugural artists' residency exhibition.
- 29 June 2024 – 29 June 2024: Artist of the Day: Group Show, Flowers Gallery, Cork Street, London
- 30 June 2024 – 1 September 2024: TEARS: The Final Show, TKE Studios, Margate The final show for the inaugural Tracey Emin Artists' Residency.
- 21 November 2024 – 4 January 2025: Small is Beautiful: 42nd Edition, Flowers Gallery, Cork Street, London

== Awards ==
=== Artist residencies ===
- 2022/23 — Artist-in-residence, Orleans House Gallery, London
- 2023/24 — TEAR, Margate. Selected by Tracey Emin for the inaugural Tracey Emin Artist Residency (2023–24) at TKE Studios in Margate.

=== Commissions ===
- 2022 — Commissioned by King's College London in collaboration with Shape Arts and AccessArt. Coinciding with UK Disability History Month.

=== Features ===
- 24 June 2024 – 24 June 2024: Artist of the Day, Flowers Gallery, Cork Street, London Selected by Tracey Emin.
- November 2024 — Three To Watch, Hotly tipped female talent of the British art scene, Harper's Bazaar Magazine UK.

== Filmography ==
=== Television ===
Year	Title	Role	Notes	Ref.
2023	The Unique Boutique	Herself, Guest Designer	Episode 2	
2024	Art Matters	Herself, Artist, TEAR	Sky Arts feature documentary by Melvyn Bragg	

== See also ==
- Visual impairment in art
