= Art Link – West Midlands =

1980s and 1990s arts organisation in England

Art Link – West Midlands was a participatory arts organisation active in the United Kingdom during the 1980s and 1990s. Based in the West Midlands, it was part of the national Shape Network, which aimed to widen cultural access for disabled and marginalised individuals. Art Link supported creative opportunities in hospitals, care homes, prisons, and community centres, enabling people with limited access to mainstream culture to take part in and create artistic work.

== History ==
Art Link emerged in the late 1970s, building on the ethos of the community arts movement which challenged the traditional hierarchies of artistic production on the basis of cultural democracy. Its stated aim was to "promote and encourage arts activities for people for whom little provision exists". The organisation worked with elderly people, those with disabilities, people recovering from mental illness, and individuals in prison, probation, or residential care.

Art Link facilitated workshops and residencies by professional artists, brought live performances into institutions, and trained staff in creative methods. A 1991 reflection by coordinator Lee Corner described the organisation as "all the people who are involved in it", emphasising its collaborative and relational character.

== Policy Context ==
Art Link's work reflected broader changes in UK arts policy. In the 1980s, under the Thatcher government, public arts funding was reduced and organisations were increasingly expected to demonstrate social impact. Following the Arts Council report The Glory of the Garden (1984), regional organisations were tasked with improving access while meeting new efficiency standards. Art Link adapted by embedding artists in care institutions and framing its work in terms of social benefit, anticipating later models of arts in health and criminal justice.

In the 1990s, under New Labour, cultural policy increasingly emphasised social inclusion, access, and regeneration, aligning closely with Art Link's participatory approach.

== Legacy ==
Art Link – West Midlands contributed to the development of fields such as Arts in health, Creative ageing, and Arts in criminal justice. Its cross-sector collaborations, residencies, and participatory ethos prefigured practices now common in socially engaged art. Cultural policy researchers cite initiatives such as Art Link as early examples of socially engaged practice that combined artistic and social objectives in innovative ways.

Although the organisation no longer exists in its original form, it is regarded as part of the history of participatory and community arts in the UK.

== See also ==
- Shape Arts
- Participatory art
- Community art
- Arts Council England
- Socially engaged art
