= Jason Wilsher-Mills =

Digital artist from Lincolnshire

Jason Wilsher-Mills MBE is a digital artist from Wakefield West Yorkshire. He now lives in Sleaford in Lincolnshire, England. His work uses sculpture, augmented reality, 3D Printing, murals, cinematography, portraiture and painting. In 2015, he was featured at the Museum of Islamic art in Doha, Qatar, and in 2020 he received the Adam Reynolds Award.

== Disability ==
Wilsher-Mills has chronic polyneuropathy, and chronic fatigue syndrome which he has lived with since the age of eleven, resulting in hospitalisation. These conditions affect his mobility and left him paralysed from the neck down for five years. The polyneuropathy is progressive, also affecting his immune system, which forced him to self-isolate during the COVID-19 pandemic. His tendons have also been damaged, which makes drawing difficult. Before the Covid outbreak, he was set to show his work at the Tate.

When he was twelve, his brother took him to see Jaws on a weekend release from the hospital. They were refused entry to the cinema, as the manager deemed Mills a "fire-hazard", due to his wheelchair. Prior to 1995, access to public places was not legally guaranteed to disabled people. Mills recalls this is the first time he was made to feel different. He would later create two banners in 2015, for the Houses of Parliament. One commemorated the Disability Discrimination Act: he specifically requested this commission as he himself has lived through the effects of the Act and has seen the real life changes. While the other banner marked 800 years since Magna Carta.

== Art ==
Mills compares his art to the Beano comic strip and Ken Loach's I, Daniel Blake. The exhibitions he creates are often humorous and political in nature, and he prefers positivity to anger. His sculptural work often includes interactive AR elements, and are sometimes inflatable. An iPad is his primary tool, which he started using after reading an article on painter David Hockney's usage. The tablet is portable and the high definition allows him to scale up his artworks. This has allowed Mills to regain some of his freedom. He has a free augmented reality app, Jason Residential, available to download from Google Play.

Mills has also worked for the Wakefield Trinity Wildcats, a rugby team based in based in West Yorkshire, for a year long project. The two-hundred foot mural included portraits of star players and utilised 3,000 school children's drawings of themselves. It was installed around the stand of the stadium. His father and he would watch rugby together when he was a child and he has stated that it was the "closest time I ever spent with him". The piece, which is dedicated to his father, is designed to be a time capsule, and Mills hopes that the children featured will one day bring their own children to see it.

In 2021, he created a statue called 'I Am Argonaut', for the Folkestone Triennial, an art festival held in Kent. The sculpture was placed opposite a statue of William Harvey, the local physician who, in 1628, discovered how the heart circulates blood around the body. 'I Am Argonaut' is depicted pointing at a hole in its chest, where the heart should be located, laughing; the statue of Harvey holds a disembodied heart. The piece was produced in conjunction with Shape Arts.

Mills created other Argonaut installations as part of an Arts Council England funded project 'Jason & his Argonauts on Tour' which toured the United Kingdom. The centrepiece was the 'Changing Places Argonaut', a 3.5 metre inflatable which "relates people's stories from the Changing Places movement". In 2022 the People's History Museum in Manchester, England exhibited 'The Manchester Argonaut', a sculpture about "activism and the rights of disabled people".

== Awards ==
In 2024 Mills won the Temporary or Touring Exhibition of the Year – budget less than £80k for his 'Are We There Yet' exhibition following its time at the Ferens Art Gallery in Hull, earlier in the year.

The King's Birthday Honours 2025 brought Mills an MBE for services to the Arts and Disability.
