= Sam Shendi =

Egyptian-born, British sculptor (born 1975)

- Born: 1975 (age 50–51)
- Education: Helwan University
- Known for: Sculpture

Sam Shendi is an Egyptian-born, British sculptor. He uses contemporary industrial material, steel, stainless steel, aluminium and fibreglass to create his figurative work. He lives and works in North Yorkshire.

== Early life ==
Sam Shendi was born in 1975 on the Nile Delta in a small town called Dekernes. He graduated from the Helwan University of Fine Arts in Cairo in 1997 with a first class honours degree in Sculpture and Architecture. In 1996 he won the Mahmoud Mokhtar Sculpture Award. Shendi moved to Britain in 2000 and became a member of the Royal British Society of Sculptors in 2014.

== Work ==
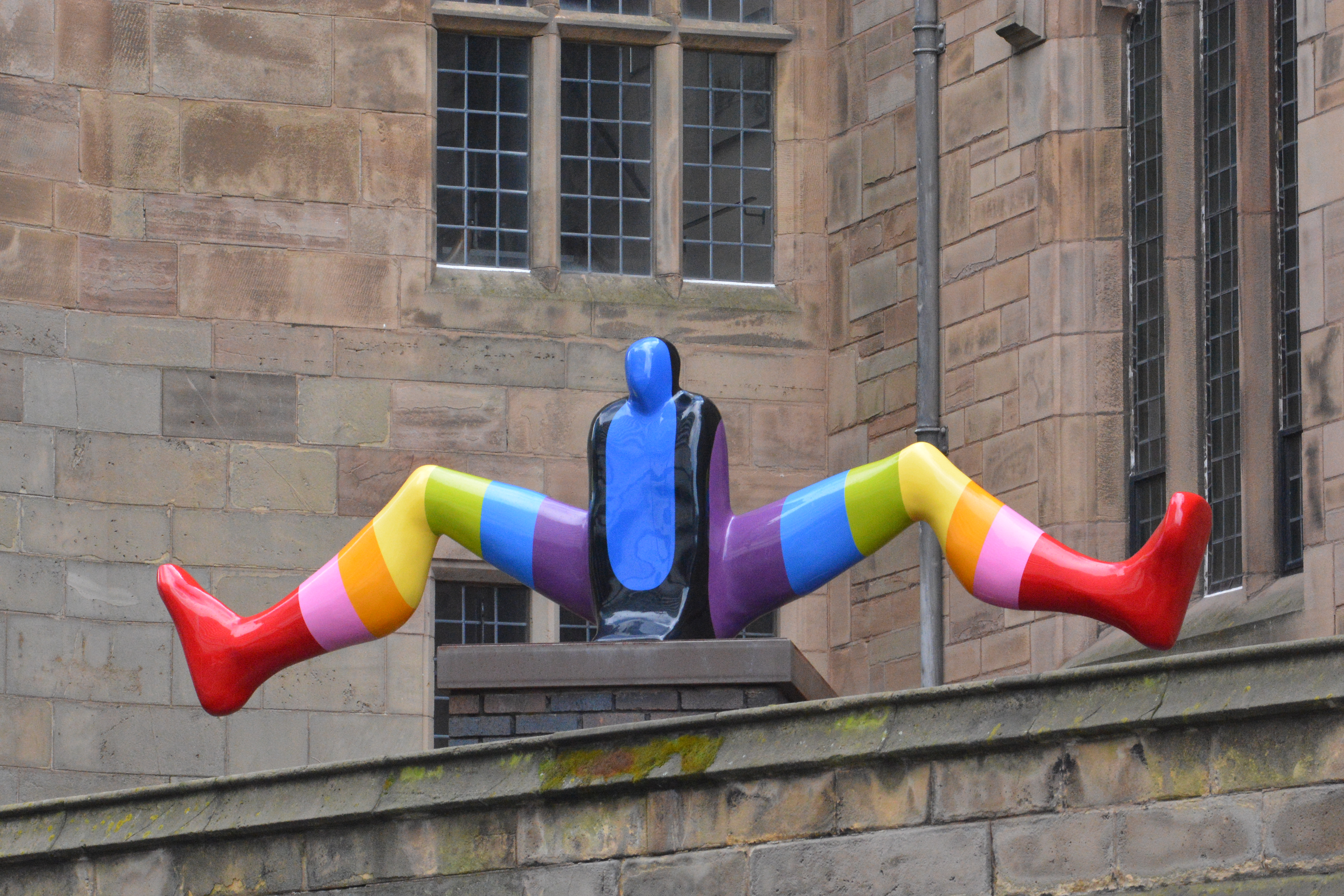
Split Decision a sculpture created by Sam Shendi in Liverpool in February 2020.

Shendi's early work primarily utilized bronze and stainless steel. His later semi-abstract figures incorporate curved forms and varied color palettes. While the pieces exhibit uniform finishes, each is handmade using contemporary industrial materials, including car filler and spray paint, and finished by manual sanding. The figures include loosely human forms as well as animal and bird hybrids, drawing on Egyptian art and architecture.

- The First@108 Public Art Award by the Royal British Society of Sculptors (2013)
- The Mahmoud Mokhtar Sculpture Award (1996)
- Liverpool Plinth winner 2019

== Select exhibitions ==
- Seasons, Solo exhibition, Graham's Fine Art Gallery, Johannesburg (2017)
- Mother and Child, Solo exhibition, The Civic, Barnsley (2016–2017)
- Body and Soul, Solo exhibition, Munich, Germany (2015)
- FLUX, Group Exhibition, The Rag Factory, London (2015)
- Only Human, Solo exhibition, Cartwright Museum and Gallery, Bradford (2014–2015)
- First @108, Solo exhibition, The Royal British Society of Sculptors, London (2014)
- International Exhibition of Contemporary Art, De Oude Kerk, Amsterdam (2012)
- Art in Mind, Group Show, Brick Lane Gallery, London (2011)

== Public art ==
- Art in the Park, Lister Park, Bradford (2014–2015)
- Public sculpture for the Bent Nail, Silsden, West Yorkshire (2011)
- God's Eye in Craven Baptist Church for its 300-year celebration, Sutton-in-Craven, North Yorkshire (2011)
- Split Decisions, the winner of the 2019 Liverpool Plinth

== Art market ==
Shendi is represented by Graham's Fine Art Gallery, Johannesburg. Shendi's work has been collected by art collectors and organisations in South Africa, Panama, Taiwan, Germany, United Kingdom and United States.

== Images ==
- 'Anvil' and 'Moving Forward', part of the "Only Human" collection.
