= Visual impairment in art =

Visual impairment in art is a limited topic covered by research, with its focus being on how visually impaired people are represented in artwork throughout history. This is commonly portrayed through the inclusion of objects such as canes and dogs to symbolize blindness, which is the most frequently depicted visual impairment in art. Many notable figures in art history, such as Leonardo da Vinci, Claude Monet, and Georgia O'Keeffe, were visually impaired, or theorized to be so.

== Representation by era ==
=== Antiquity ===
The Moche culture of ancient Peru depicted the blind in their ceramics.

In 1768, James Bruce discovered the tomb of Ramesses III, whereon its walls depicted images of blind harpists. Their visual impairment was represented by having slits for eyes.

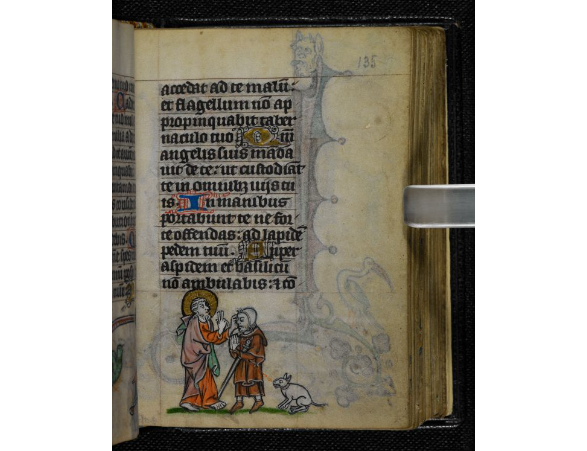
Healing a blind man in the Maastricht Hours

=== Medieval ===
Representation of blind people in Medieval art often is portrayed with leashed dogs. Some examples include:

- The Miracle at Mont St Michel in the Luttrell Psalter, held in the British Library. The image displays a barefoot blind man in a long pale yellow tunic carrying a staff.
- Healing a blind man in the Maastricht Hours, held in the British Library. The blind man wears a loose brown tunic while being led by a white dog.
- The Goldsmith of Arras, an illustration in the Miracles de Nostre Dame depicts a blind boy with a white staff.

=== Renaissance ===
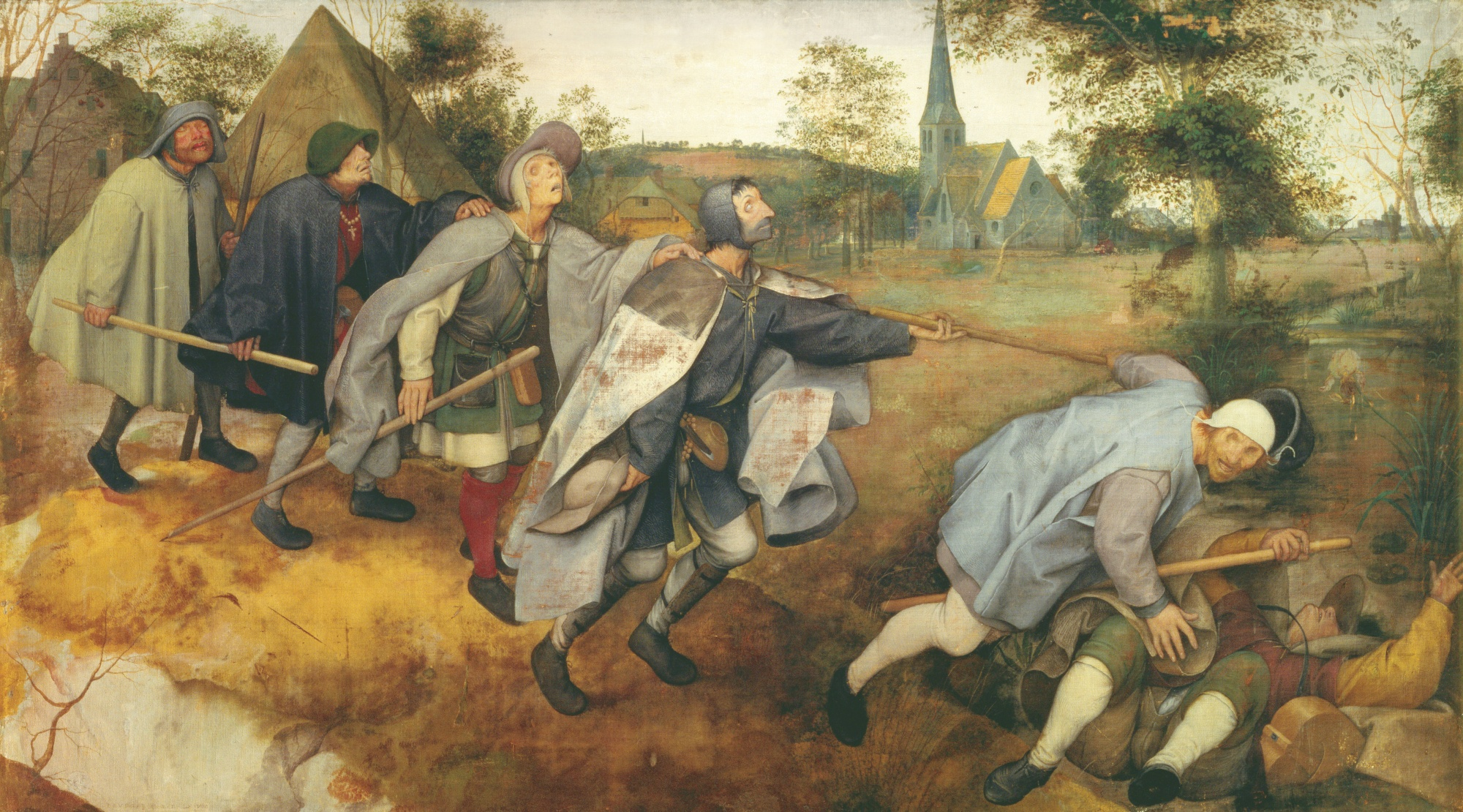
Parable of the Blind by Pieter Bruegel the Elder

Representation of blind people in Renaissance art, similar to Medieval art, was conveyed through symbolic objects. Some examples include:

- A blind man feels his way with a staff in Piers Plowman.
- Pilgrimage to the tomb of St Louis in Life and Miracles of Saint Louis, displaying a young blind boy with a cane.

Blindness was portrayed in more literal terms as well, via closed eyes or in text. Some examples include:

- Pieter Bruegel the Elder, Flemish Renaissance painter, produced the parable of the blind leading the blind in 1568.

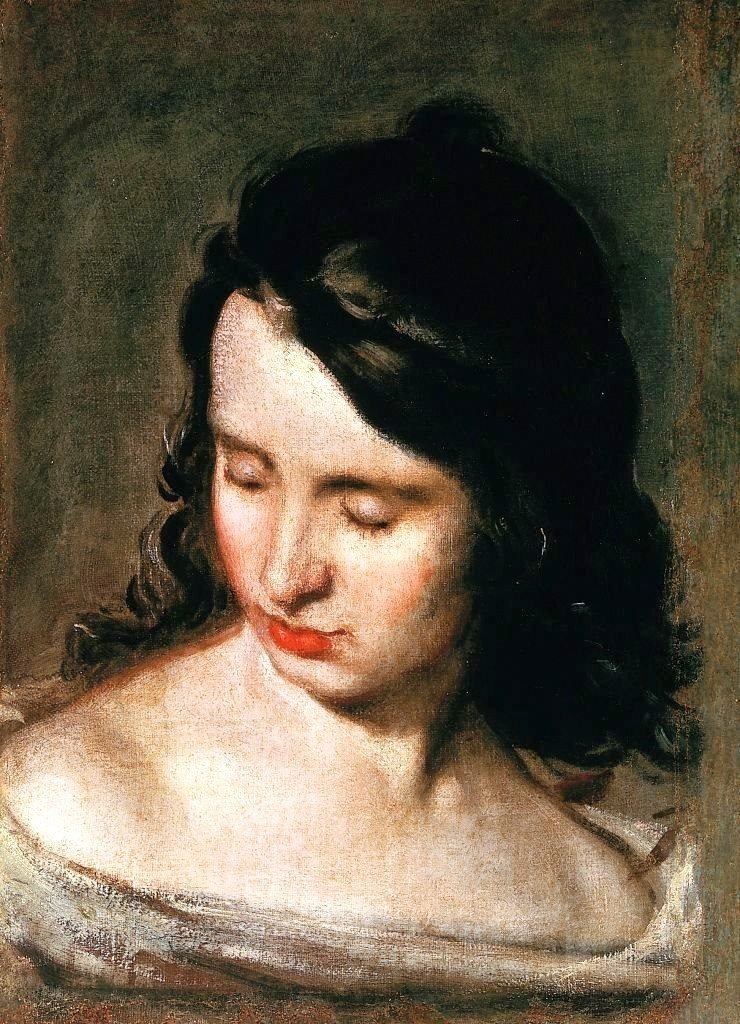
Blind Woman by Diego Velázquez

- Rembrandt, 17th-century Dutch painter, often depicted scenes from the apocryphal Book of Tobit, which tells the story of a blind patriarch who is healed by his son, Tobias, with the help of the archangel Raphael.
- Diego Velázquez, 17th-century Spanish painter, created the image of a blind woman and represented her visual impairment by portraying her with her eyes closed.

=== Romanticism ===
Most representation found in Romantic art displays portraits of individuals who experience visual impairments.

- Blind Magistrate Sir John Fielding was painted by Nathaniel Hone in 1762, with a black band above his eyes. This was common amongst images of the blind in the 18th century.
- George Whitefield painted by John Wollaston in 1742 includes his visual impairment of a squint, as a result of measles in childhood.
- The Blind Girl painted by John Everett Millais displays two beggars, one of whom is a blind musician.
- Blinking Sam painted by Joshua Reynolds depicts a myopic Samuel Johnson squinting at a book and holding it closely to his face in order to read it.

=== Modern ===
In Modern art many different mediums have been used to portray visual impairments.

- A sitting blind beggar sells 'love sonnets' to obtain money with a young boy, in an etching by J.T. Smith in 1816.
- Oliver Caswell and Laura Bridgman reading embossed letters from a book. A Lithograph made by W Sharp in 1844.
- Work - School for the Blind, Euston Road. An engraving made by an unknown artist published in Illustrated London News on 24 April 1858.
- Portrait of William Moon, created by an unknown photographer. Published in Light for the Blind: History of the Origin and Success of Moon's System of Reading 1873.
- Photograph of Ann Whiting taken by an unknown photographer in the 1860s.
- Oil Canvas of Henry Fawcett and Dame Millicent Garrett Fawcett painted by Ford Madox Brown in 1872. Currently held in the National Portrait Gallery in London, England.
- A Blind Girl Reading, Oil canvas created by Ejnar Nielson in 1905.

== Influence on artists ==
=== Renaissance ===
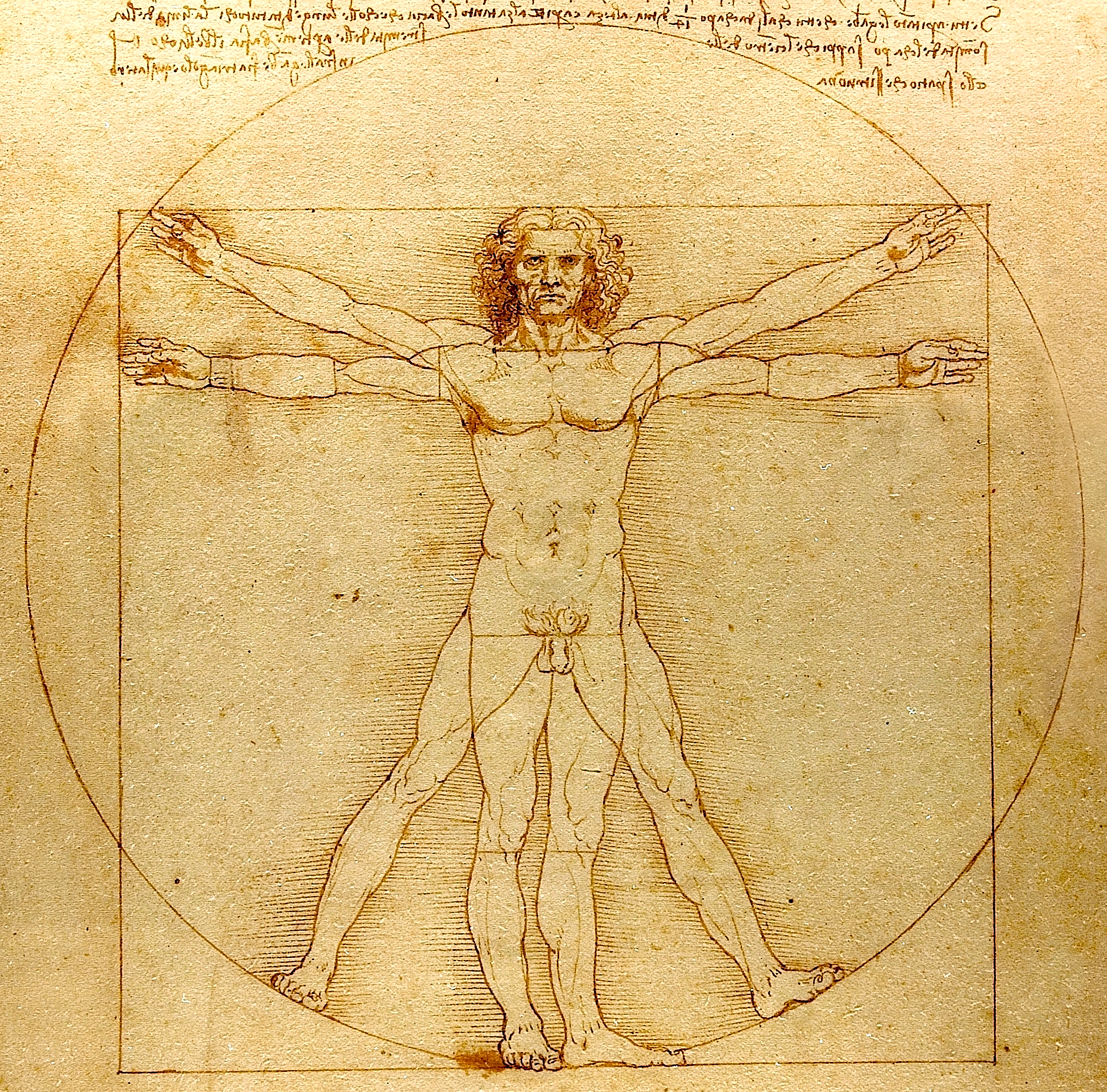
The Vitruvian Man by Leonardo da Vinci

Leonardo da Vinci was an Italian polymath widely known for his diverse talents including his paintings and drawings. After examining six of Da Vinci's works across three different techniques, researchers noted that the eye of the subject in each of his works turned outward. One of these works included the famous depiction of the Vitruvian Man. The eyes were at an angle consistent with intermittent exotropia (deviated outward) which can alter the perception of people and objects to appear 2D. The researchers theorize this may have contributed to Da Vinci's ability to capture space on a flat canvas.

Guercino was an Italian Baroque painter who developed esotropia (a condition in which the eye turns inward). This affected his work causing his subjects to appear as having unusual facial features.

Francis Bacon was an English Philosopher who dabbled in creating illustrations for his works. His illustrations often depict heavily distorted images that feature abnormalities in faces. This has been theorized to run consistent with dysmorphopsia, a brain condition that affects perception of objects.

Rembrandt was a Dutch painter whose self portraits display an outward turned eye which would have caused a lack of depth perception called stereo blindness. This meant that details were varied in his paintings.

Pablo Picasso was a Spanish printmaker and co-founder of the Cubist Movement. It is believed that he may have experienced strabismus, which is why his work is characterized by a lack of depth perception.

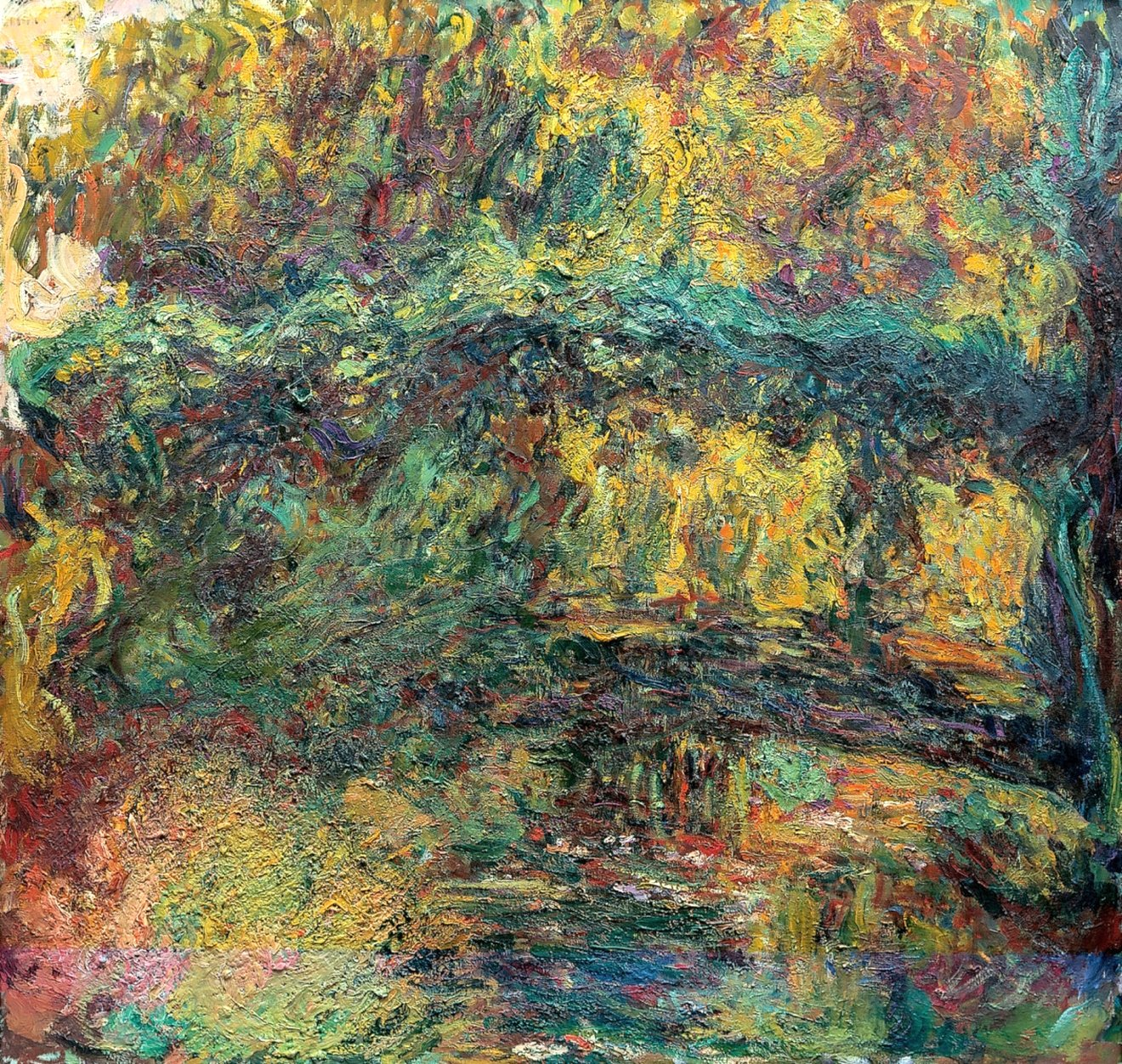
The Japanese Bridge by Claude Monet

=== Modern ===
Edgar Degas was a French impressionist artist famous for his pastel drawings and oil paintings. In 1870, he began noticing signs of decreasing vision which is attested to retinal degeneration. The blurriness of his later paintings is usually attributed to his condition.

Claude Monet was a French painter and founder of Impressionism. He is widely known for his Water Lilies series. From 1912 to 1922, his vision declined due to cataracts. This affected the colour perception of his images which makes many of his paintings appear slightly blurry and yellowish in tone.

Pierre-Auguste Renoir was a French Impressionist artist. He is alleged to have had myopia.

Georgia O'Keeffe was an American artist who experienced symptoms of age-related macular degeneration in 1964. In her later works she enlisted assistants to help in painting her work, but kept credit of her works to herself.

=== Contemporary ===
Michael Naranjo is a Native American blind sculptor who lost his sight to a grenade in the Vietnam War and began sculpting with clay during convalescence. His work is in the permanent collection of the White House, and his words are inscribed on the glass panels of the American Veterans Disabled for Life Memorial in Washington, D.C., and cited by President Obama at the dedication ceremony on October 5, 2014:

"When you're young, you're invincible. You're immortal. I thought I'd come back. Perhaps I wouldn't, there was that thought, too, but I had this feeling that I would come back. Underneath that feeling, there was another, that maybe I wouldn't be quite the same, but I felt I'd make it back."—Michael A. Naranjo

Bianca Raffaella is an English registered blind painter and disability activist.

== See also ==
- Cultural depictions of blindness
