= Blinking Sam =

c. 1775 painting by Joshua Reynolds

Portrait of Samuel Johnson
- Blinking Sam
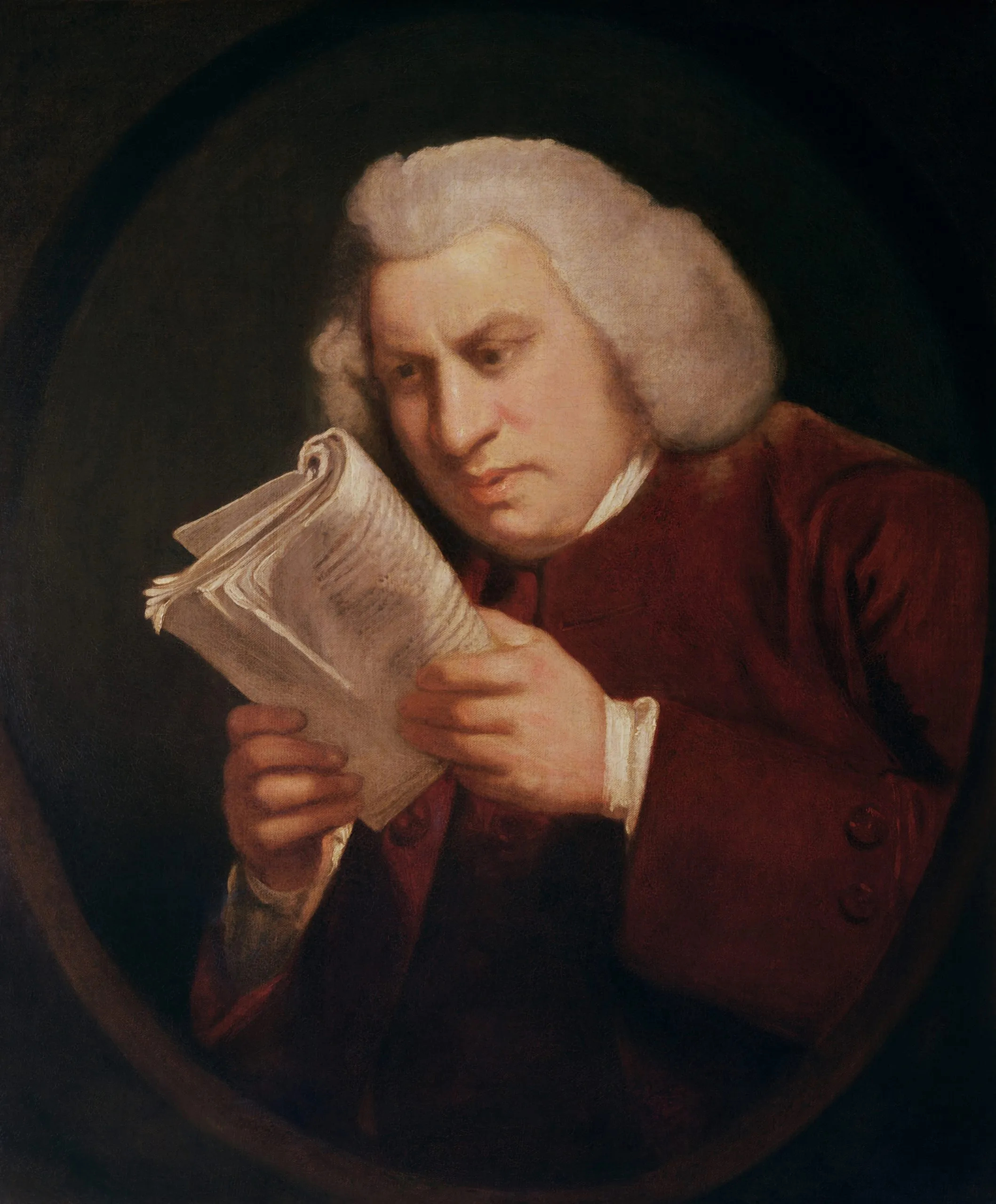
- Artist: Joshua Reynolds
- Year: c. 1775
- Medium: Oil on canvas
- Subject: Samuel Johnson
- Dimensions: 76 cm × 63 cm (30 in × 25 in)
- Location: The Huntington, San Marino, California, United States
- Accession: 2006.22

Portrait of Samuel Johnson, also known as Blinking Sam, is an oil-painted portrait of English lexicographer Samuel Johnson reading, created by English artist Joshua Reynolds around 1775. The painting highlights Johnson's vision problems, which led Johnson to deride the painting and say that he would not be "Blinking Sam", as quoted in Hester Thrale's Anecdotes of the Late Samuel Johnson. The artwork has since been noted to be the "best-known" portrait of Johnson, and became an Internet meme in 2012. The painting is located at The Huntington Library, San Marino, California, United States, where it is on display.

== Background ==
Samuel Johnson was an English author and lexicographer, and is considered to be "arguably the most distinguished man of letters in English history" by the Oxford Dictionary of National Biography. He established his literary reputation with the publication of A Dictionary of the English Language, the "first full collation of the English language". Joshua Reynolds, a close friend of Johnson, was an English portrait painter and aesthetic theorist. According to The Oxford Companion to British History, "[a]lmost every person of note in the second half of the 18th [century] had their portrait painted by Reynolds." Among these portraits were four of Johnson, whom Reynolds emulated and with whom he had founded the Literary Club alongside Edmund Burke and Oliver Goldsmith.

=== Ocular health of Johnson ===
Johnson had an infection in his left eye, and contracted king's evil at approximately two years of age, both of which severely affected his eyesight. His left eye was weaker than his right, although the latter had been inflamed in 1756. Various sources attest to his nearsightedness, which led Johnson to read text with the material very close to his face; however, contemporary accounts of his capacity for seeing are often contradictory, with some describing his vision as reasonably good.

== Composition ==
According to James Northcote, Reynolds' pupil and fellow painter, the painting was created in the year 1775; however, it could have been begun earlier if it is the same item recorded in a transaction in Reynolds' ledger on May 12, 1774. The oil on canvas painting in a feigned oval depicts a myopic Johnson in his signature brown coat squintingly reading an unbound book or a pamphlet bent back to front by holding it close to his face, with light falling on his face and hands. Reynolds, who was himself deaf, may have linked the portrait to an earlier self-portrait of himself cupping his ear to symbolize his disability.

== Johnson's reaction ==
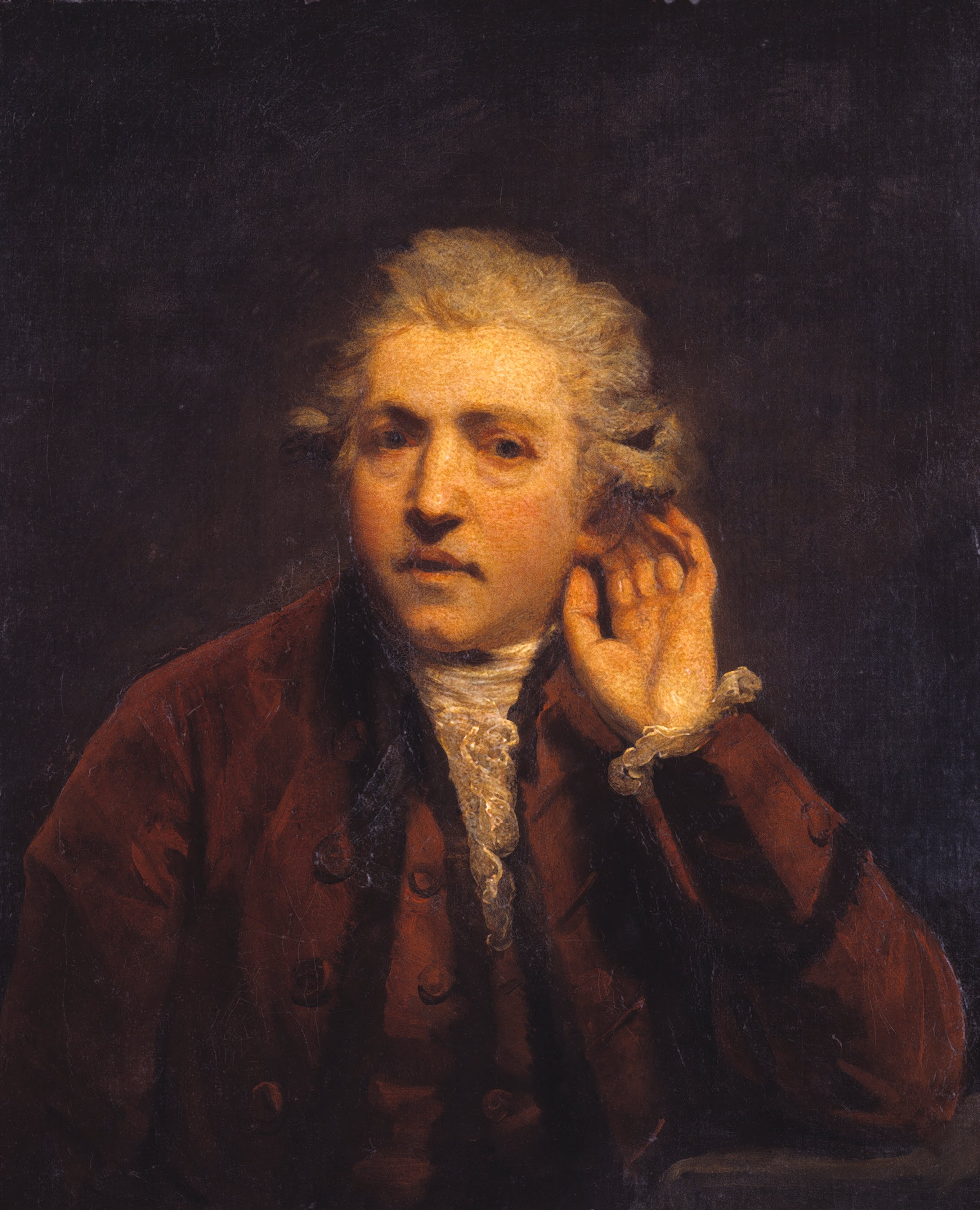
Self-Portrait as a Deaf Man by Joshua Reynolds, c. 1775. Johnson said that Reynolds "may paint himself as deaf if he chooses" but that "I will not be Blinking Sam."

According to Hester Thrale's Anecdotes of the Late Samuel Johnson, Johnson reacted negatively to the painting and rejected being depicted as "Blinking Sam". Thrale reported the following:

When Sir Joshua Reynolds had painted [Johnson's] portrait looking into the slit of his pen, and holding it almost close to his eye, as was his general custom, he felt displeased, and told me "he would not be known by posterity for his defects only, let Sir Joshua do his worst." I said in reply that Reynolds had no such difficulties about himself, and that he might observe the picture which hung up in the room where we were talking represented Sir Joshua holding his ear in his hand to catch the sound. "He may paint himself as deaf if he chooses," replied Johnson, "but I will not be Blinking Sam."

— Hester Thrale, Anecdotes of the Late Samuel Johnson

Johnson had defined to blink as "to see obscurely" in his dictionary, in which he quoted Shakespeare's The Merchant of Venice to provide an example of the word: "What's here! the portrait of a blinking ideot [sic]." (Note: The Merchant of Venice 2.9/58, Folger Shakespeare Library) Johnson may have remembered the quote when he reacted to the portrait.

Northcote wrote in The Life of Sir Joshua Reynolds that Reynolds did not intend any offense by the painting:

It is evident, however, that Sir Joshua meant not to hurt [Johnson's] feelings: indeed, his general politeness and attention at all times, both to the comfort and to the foibles of his friends, are particularly exemplified in this year[.]

— James Northcote, The Life of Sir Joshua Reynolds

== Provenance ==
The portrait was acquired by Loren and Frances Rothschild of Los Angeles, California, United States in 1987. Loren stated that he was a collector of Johnson-related memorabilia, including images, letters, and early editions of his works. After they bought the painting, the two kept it over a fireplace in their home library before gifting it to The Huntington in San Marino, California in 2006, where it is currently on display.

== Interpretation and legacy ==
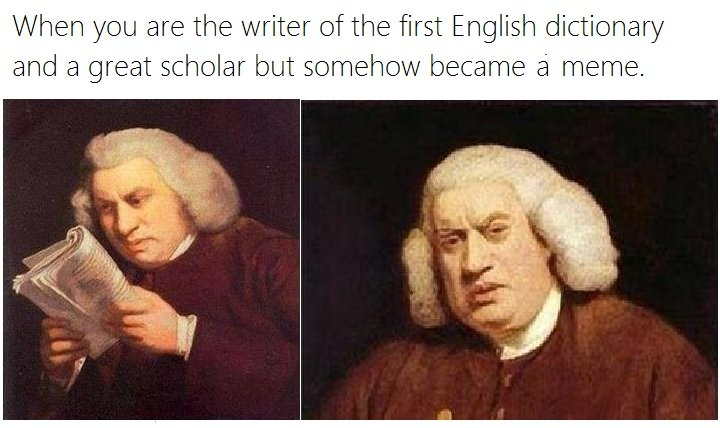
An example of an Internet meme featuring the painting

UCI professor of English Robert Folkenflik connected Reynolds' self-portrait and his portrait of Johnson to a Dutch tradition of representing the human senses in art. In his biography of Johnson, Kai Kin Yung suggests the portrait was intended to be a joke, and then states that "Reynolds's painting triumphantly transformed his friend's defect into an engaging study." In Dr Johnson's Heart, Daniel Cook says that the artwork is the "best-known" portrait of Johnson. Susan Rather notes that Reynolds often made more introspective and singular likenesses of close friends in private contexts, which explains Johnson's focus on reading, rather than on the viewer. English art critic William Hazlitt commented that the portrait "has altogether that sluggishness of outward appearance,—that want of quickness and versatility,—that absorption of faculty, and look of purblind reflection, which were characteristic of his mind."

=== Internet meme ===
Blinking Sam gained popularity as an Internet meme template beginning in 2012, often used to express confusion or shock in reaction to a line of text or an absurd situation. The painting is typically featured alongside a second painting of Johnson by Reynolds from 1772, showing Johnson with a bewildered facial expression. The meme is often accompanied by a caption reading "What the fuck did I just read?".

== See also ==
- Visual impairment in art
