= Visual arts =

Art forms involving visual perception

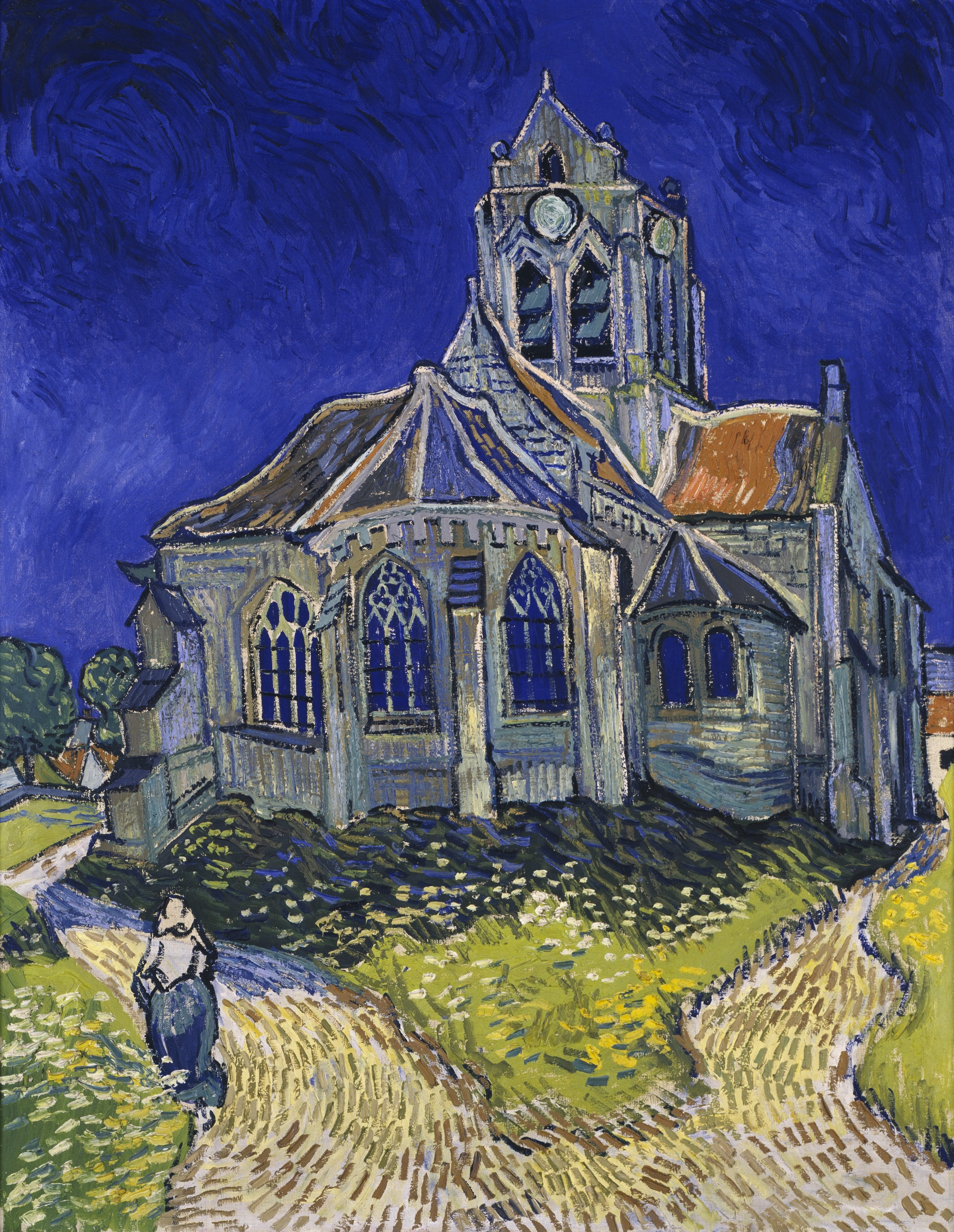
The Church at Auvers, an oil painting by Vincent van Gogh (1890)

Urban sketching with watercolour (2019)

The visual arts are art forms such as painting, drawing, printmaking, sculpture, ceramics, photography, video, image, filmmaking, design, crafts, and architecture. Many artistic disciplines such as performing arts, conceptual art, and textile arts also involve aspects of the visual arts, as well as arts of other types. Within the visual arts, the applied arts—such as industrial design, graphic design, fashion design, interior design, and decorative art—are also included.

Current usage of the term "visual arts" includes fine art as well as applied or decorative arts and crafts, but this was not always the case. Before the Arts and Crafts Movement in Britain and elsewhere at the turn of the 20th century, the term 'artist' had for some centuries often been restricted to a person working in the fine arts (such as painting, sculpture, or printmaking) and not the decorative arts, crafts, or applied visual arts media. The distinction was emphasized by artists of the Arts and Crafts Movement, who valued vernacular art forms as much as high forms. Art schools made a distinction between the fine arts and the crafts, maintaining that a craftsperson could not be considered a practitioner of the arts.

The increasing tendency to privilege painting, and to a lesser degree sculpture, above other arts has been a feature of Western art as well as East Asian art. In both regions, painting has been seen as relying on the imagination of the artist to the highest degree and being the furthest removed from manual labour—in Chinese painting, valued styles were "scholar-painting", at least in theory practiced by gentleman amateurs. The Western hierarchy of genres reflected similar attitudes.

== Education and training ==
Visual arts education and training have changed over time, with approaches varying across global and cultural contexts. Historically, training in the visual arts began as variations of the apprentice and workshop systems, typically over a period of 2 to 6 years.

The evolution of art education through time has followed different regional paths. In many European and North American nations, formal art academies grew into universities and institutes. Influenced by industrialization, their focus shifted to prioritizing applied arts over fine arts. In contrast, several Sub-Saharan African nations have seen art education de-prioritized or removed from primary curricula in favor of vocational or STEM-focused subjects. Curricula tended to follow the priorities of the state or nobility in Asian regions, though nations like Singapore have modernized their approach by focusing resources on digital visual arts as a core component of the creative economy. In the Middle East, contemporary education pivoted from 19th-century European models to focusing on tourism and cultural heritage preservation.

Political, economic, and social conflicts continue to shape what is accepted as art education in schools in several regions. For example, educational systems initially restricted under colonial rule in several Latin American countries have turned to focusing on contemporary art to foster national identity. Mexican art education reflects a history of pedagogical tension, as the system has sought to reconcile indigenous artistic heritage with Western academic structures, often resulting in a fragmented educational landscape.

Museums, art galleries, and other cultural institutions serve as instruments of informal art education. Through curated collections and public programming, these institutions provide historical context and aesthetic exposure that complement or substitute for standardized academic curricula.

== Drawing ==
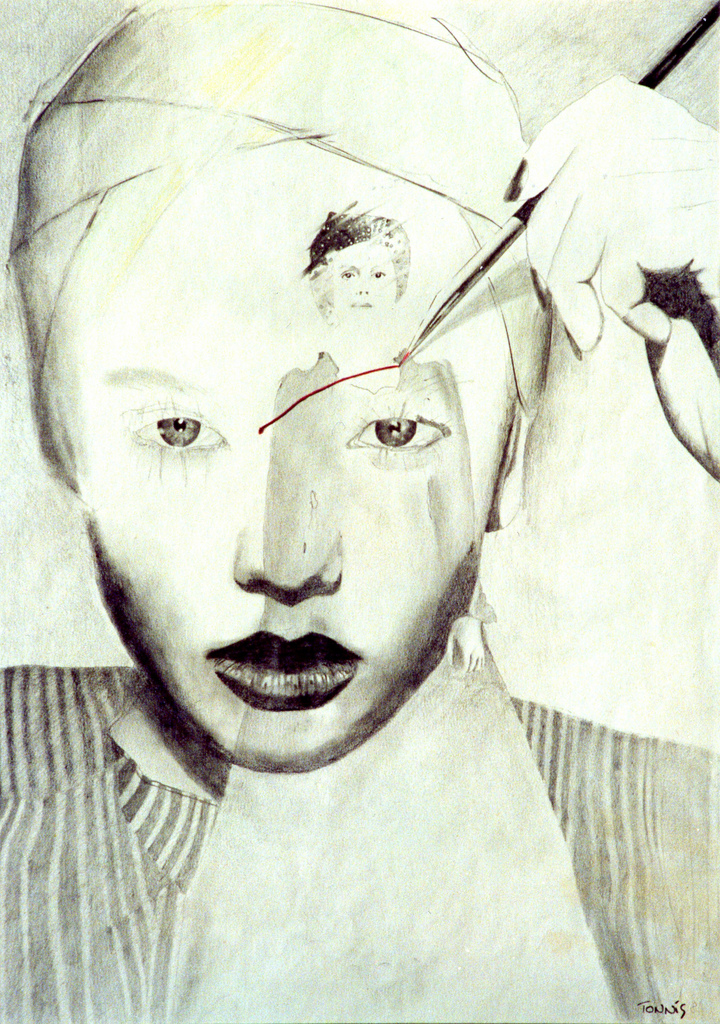
Christiaan Tonnis - Female Warrior No. 14 'Extinction', pencil and colored pencil on paper, 1981

Drawing is a means of making a 2D image, illustration or graphic using any of a wide variety of tools and techniques, both traditional and digital. It generally involves making marks on a surface by applying pressure from a tool, or moving a tool across a surface using dry media such as graphite pencils, pen and ink, inked brushes, wax color pencils, crayons, charcoal, pastels, and markers. Digital tools, including pens, stylus, that simulate the effects of these are also used. The main techniques used in drawing are: line drawing, hatching, crosshatching, random hatching, shading, scribbling, stippling, and blending. Chinese artists value the Four Treasures of the Study, which are the brush, ink, inkstone, and paper.

Drawing goes back tens of thousands of years and spans the cultures of the world. Art of the Upper Paleolithic includes figurative art beginning at least 40,000 years ago. Non-figurative cave paintings consisting of hand stencils and simple geometric shapes are even older. Paleolithic cave representations of animals are found in areas such as Lascaux, France, Altamira, Spain, Maros, Sulawesi in Asia, and Gabarnmung, Australia.

In ancient Egypt, potsherds and pieces of limestone called ostraca were used for ink drawings. Drawings on Greek vases, initially geometric, later developed into the human form with black-figure pottery during the 6th century BC. Evidence of Indian palm-leaf manuscript drawing and image-making dates back to the 5th and 6th centuries.

With the help of Islamic traders traveling from China, drawing on paper increased in the Middle East and Europe in the 14th century. Adopted by European artists such as Raphael, Michelangelo, and Leonardo da Vinci, it was treated as an art in its own right, rather than a preparatory stage for painting or sculpture.

== Painting ==
Painting is the practice of applying pigments (color) suspended in a carrier or medium and a binding agent (a glue) to a surface such as walls, canvas, or paper. Visual arts painting combines drawing, composition, and other aesthetic considerations to manifest the expressive and conceptual intention of the painter. It serves a range of purposes, from ritualistic body art and religious icons to decorative and commercial arts, such as advertising.

=== Materials and methods ===
==== Rock surfaces and mineral pigments ====
The earliest evidence of painting consists of natural pigments made from ochre, chalk, and charcoal applied directly to stone surfaces. Tools for processing these pigments for body painting date back to approximately 200,000 years ago in regions like Zambia, while formal cave paintings using twig brushes, fingers, bird feathers, and animal hair date to at least 50,000 years ago. These early applications relied on simple water or fat carriers to bind the pigment to stone supports.

==== Fixed supports and early binders ====
As societies formalized architectural and ceramic traditions, painting media adapted to new supports. In the Mediterranean and ancient India, regional traditions developed fresco and frieze techniques to decorate the plaster walls of tombs, temples, and other buildings. This era saw the expansion of binders such as tempera and encaustic. Tempera uses egg yolk, animal glue, or milk to adhere pigments to wooden panels, pottery, and early manuscripts. Encaustic art uses hot wax to fix pigments to the support. Ink wash painting developed as a major tradition in East Asia, consisting of water-soluble ink on hanging scrolls, handscrolls or handheld fans made of silk and paper, integrated structurally with poetry and careful calligraphy.

==== The development of oil paint ====
To achieve more realistic representation, artists increasingly mixed pigments into drying oils alongside various behavior-altering additives. Wood panels were initially favored as supports, later giving way to stretched canvas as artists sought greater portability. The slow drying time of oil paint allowed painters to build upon the existing classical techniques, enhancing them with shading and glazing to create paintings in chiaroscuro, suggesting three-dimensionality with light and shadow.

==== Industrialization and synthetics ====
The 19th-century invention of the box easel and collapsible paint tube allowed artists to take their painting outside the studio, into nature and modern life, called plein air painting. The paint tube also allowed painters to use synthetic colors, greatly expanding the artist's palette. Watercolors, referring to both transparent pigments in a water-based solution and the finished painting, were painted on paper. Gouache, a similar yet opaque medium, is used in commercial arts. In the 20th century, the development of synthetic acrylic binders provided a fast-drying alternative to oil paints that resisted cracking and discoloration over time.

==== Modern and digital extensions ====
Modern and contemporary artists further diversified the materials used in painting, incorporating non-traditional media such as industrial house paint, found objects, and newspaper collage into their work. In the late 20th and early 21st centuries, computer technology introduced digital painting, allowing artists to deploy traditional techniques via software programs to manipulate pixels as a medium, bypassing the need for physical pigments and binders.

== Printmaking ==
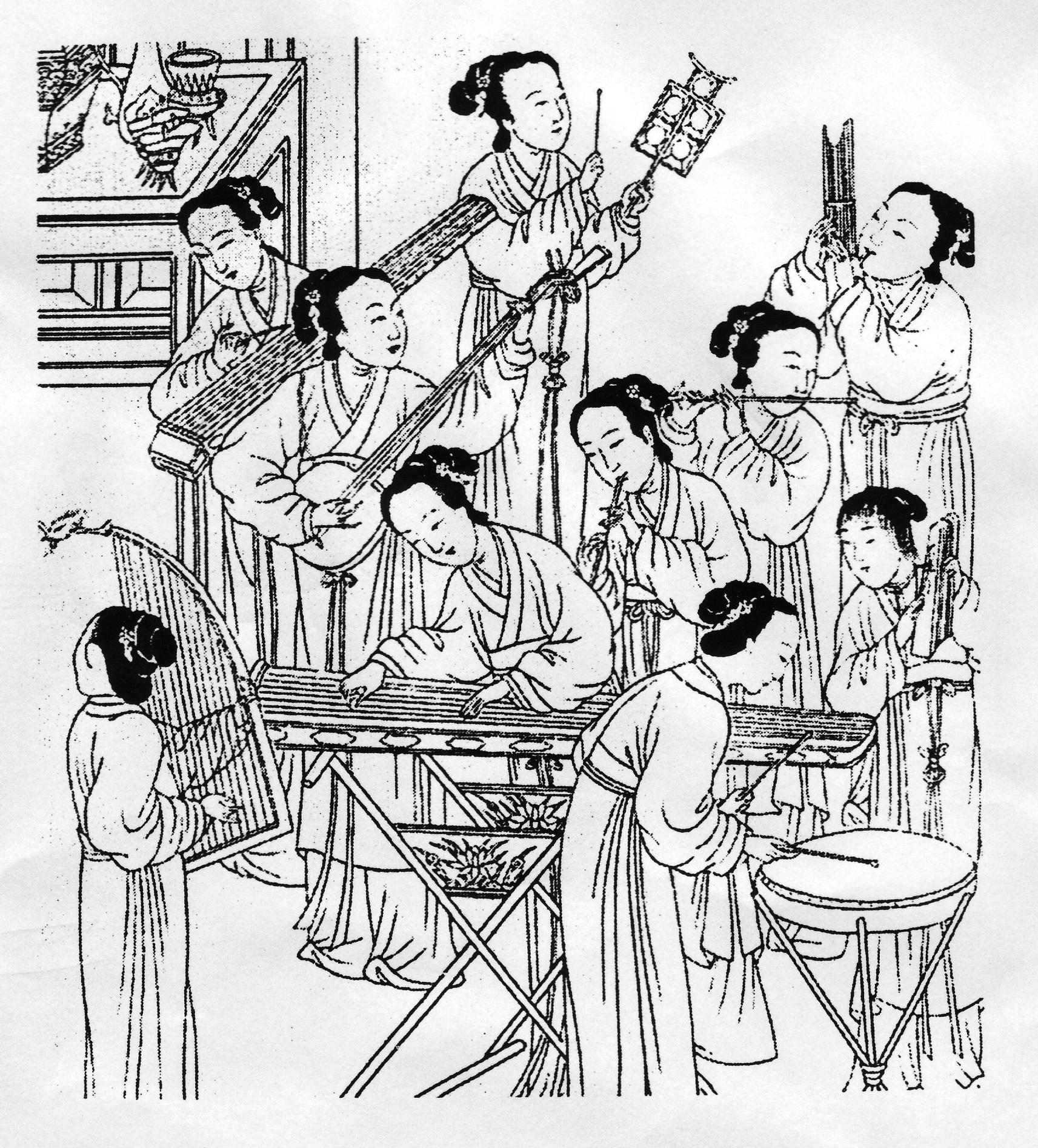
Ancient Chinese engraving of female instrumentalists

Printmaking is creating, for artistic purposes, an image on a matrix that is then transferred to a two-dimensional (flat) surface by means of ink or other form of pigmentation. Except in the case of a monotype, the same matrix can be used to produce many examples of the print.

The major techniques (also called media) involved are woodcut, line engraving, etching, lithography, and screen printing (serigraphy, silk screening); there are many others, including digital techniques. Commonly the image is transferred to paper or fabric, but other media range from cloth and vellum to more modern materials.

=== European history ===
Prints in the Western tradition produced before about 1830 are known as old master prints. In Europe, from around 1400 AD, woodcut was used for master prints on paper by using printing techniques developed in the Byzantine and Islamic worlds. Michael Wolgemut improved German woodcut from about 1475, and Erhard Reuwich, a Dutchman, was the first to use cross-hatching. At the end of the century, Albrecht Dürer brought the Western woodcut to a stage that has never been surpassed, increasing the status of the single-leaf woodcut.

=== Chinese origin and practice ===
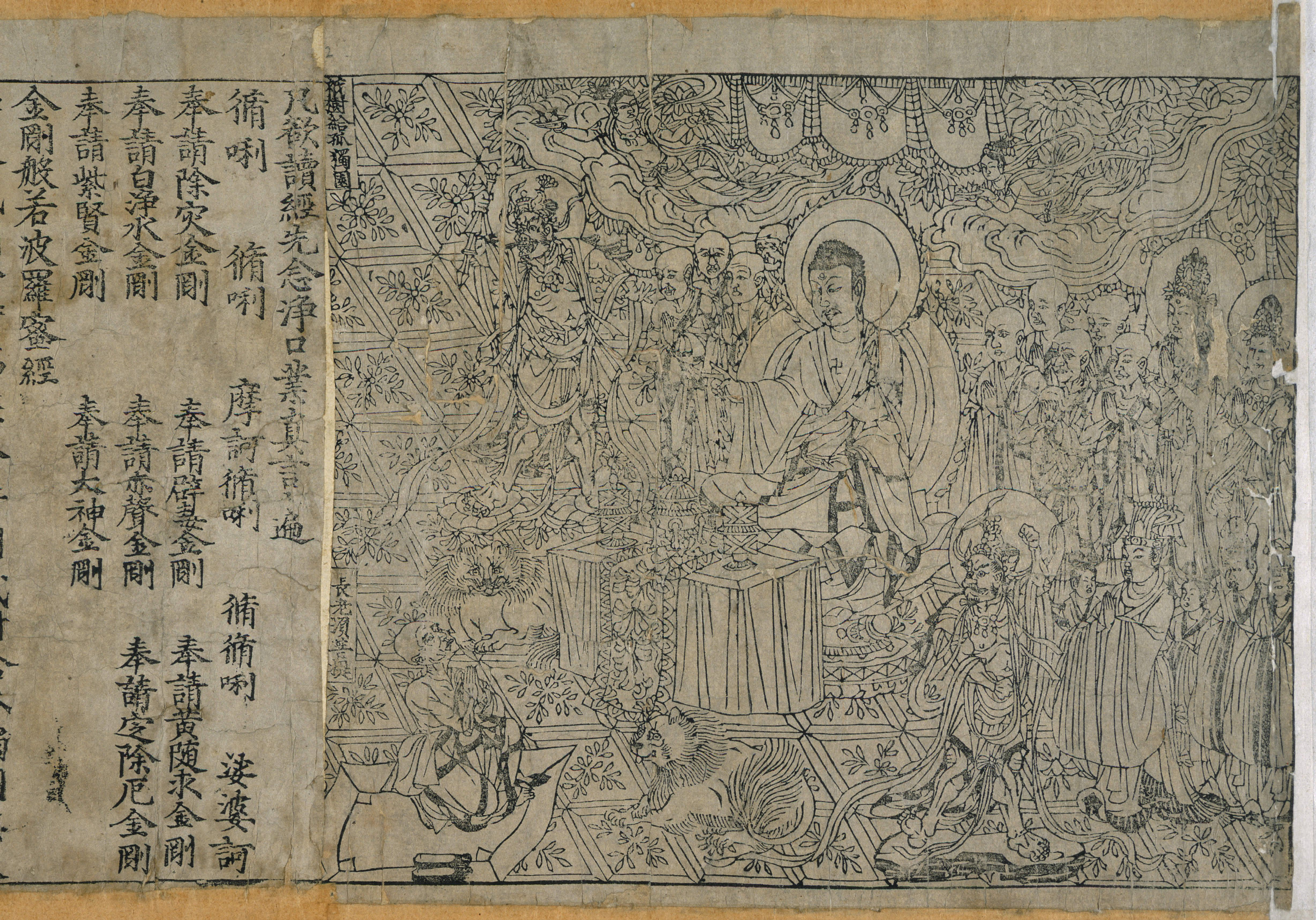
The Chinese Diamond Sutra, the world's oldest printed book (868 CE)

In China, the art of printmaking developed some 1,100 years ago as illustrations alongside text cut in woodblocks for printing on paper. Initially, images were mainly religious, but in the Song dynasty, artists began to cut landscapes. During the Ming (1368–1644) and Qing (1616–1911) dynasties, the technique was perfected for both religious and artistic engravings.

=== Development in Japan, 1603–1867 ===
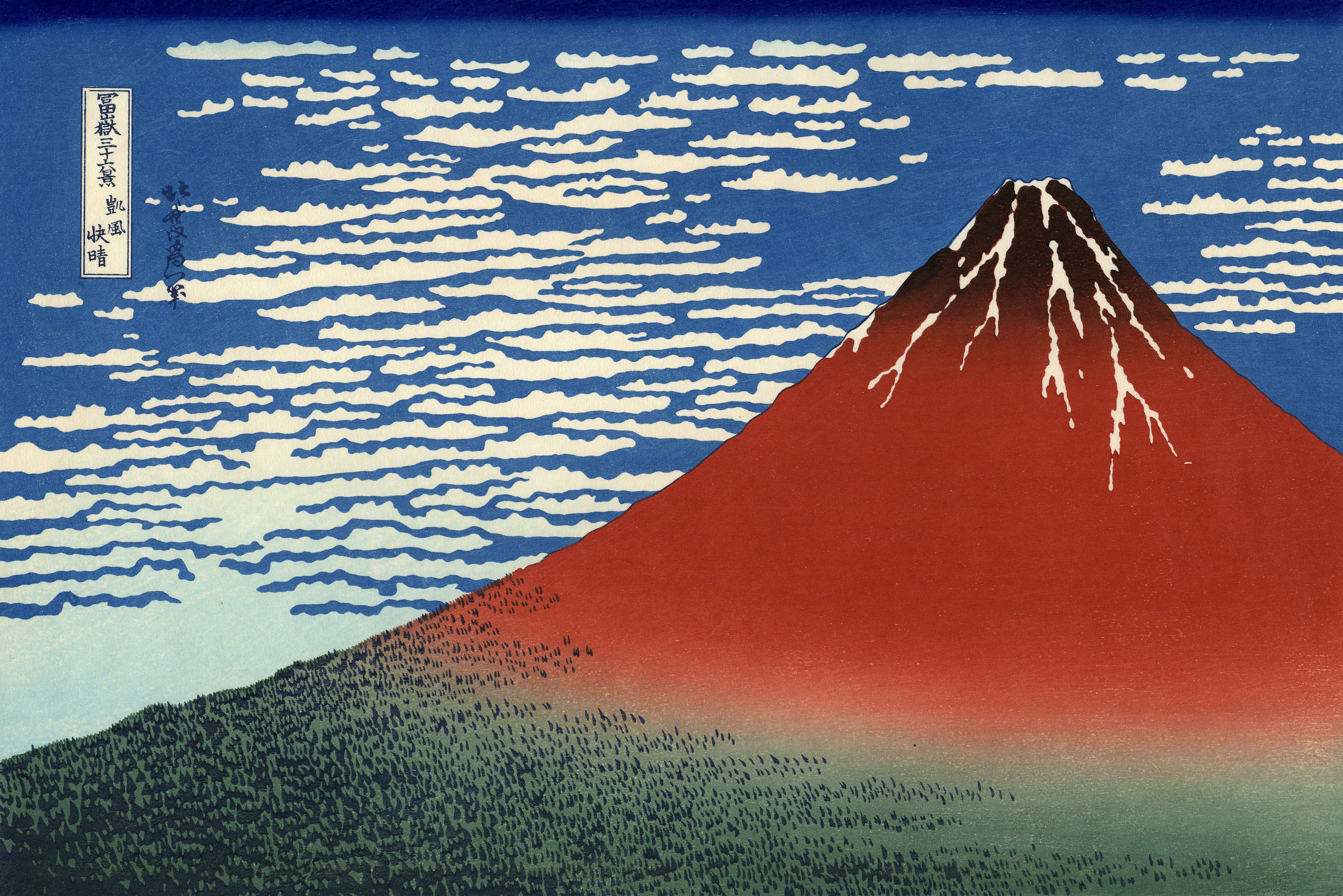
Hokusai: Red Fuji from Thirty-six Views of Mount Fuji (1830–1832)

Woodblock printing in Japan (Japanese: 木版画, mokuhanga) is a technique best known for its use in the ukiyo-e artistic genre; however, it was also used very widely for printing illustrated books in the same period. Woodblock printing had been used in China for centuries to print books, long before the advent of movable type, but was only widely adopted in Japan during the Edo period (1603–1867). Although similar to woodcut in Western printmaking in some regards, mokuhanga differs greatly in that water-based inks are used (as opposed to Western woodcut, which uses oil-based inks), allowing for a wide range of vivid color, glazes and color transparency.

After the decline of ukiyo-e and the introduction of modern printing technologies, woodblock printing continued as a method for printing texts as well as for producing art, both within traditional modes such as ukiyo-e and in a variety of more radical or Western forms that might be construed as modern art. In the early 20th century, shin-hanga that fused the tradition of ukiyo-e with the techniques of Western paintings became popular, and the works of Hasui Kawase and Hiroshi Yoshida gained international popularity. Institutes such as the "Adachi Institute of Woodblock Prints" and "Takezasado" continue to produce ukiyo-e prints with the same materials and methods as used in the past.

== Photography ==
Photography is the process of making pictures by means of the action of light. The light patterns reflected or emitted from objects are recorded onto a sensitive medium, or storage chip, through a timed exposure. The process is done through mechanical shutters or electronically timed exposure of photons into chemical processing or digitizing devices known as cameras.

The word comes from the Greek φῶς ‘’phos’’ ("light") and γραφή ‘’graphê’’ ("drawing" or "writing"), literally meaning "drawing with light". Traditionally, the product of photography has been called a photograph; the term ‘’photo’’ is an abbreviation and though many call them "pictures", the term "image" has increasingly replaced "photograph", reflecting electronic capture and the broader concept of graphical representation in optics and computing.

== Architecture ==
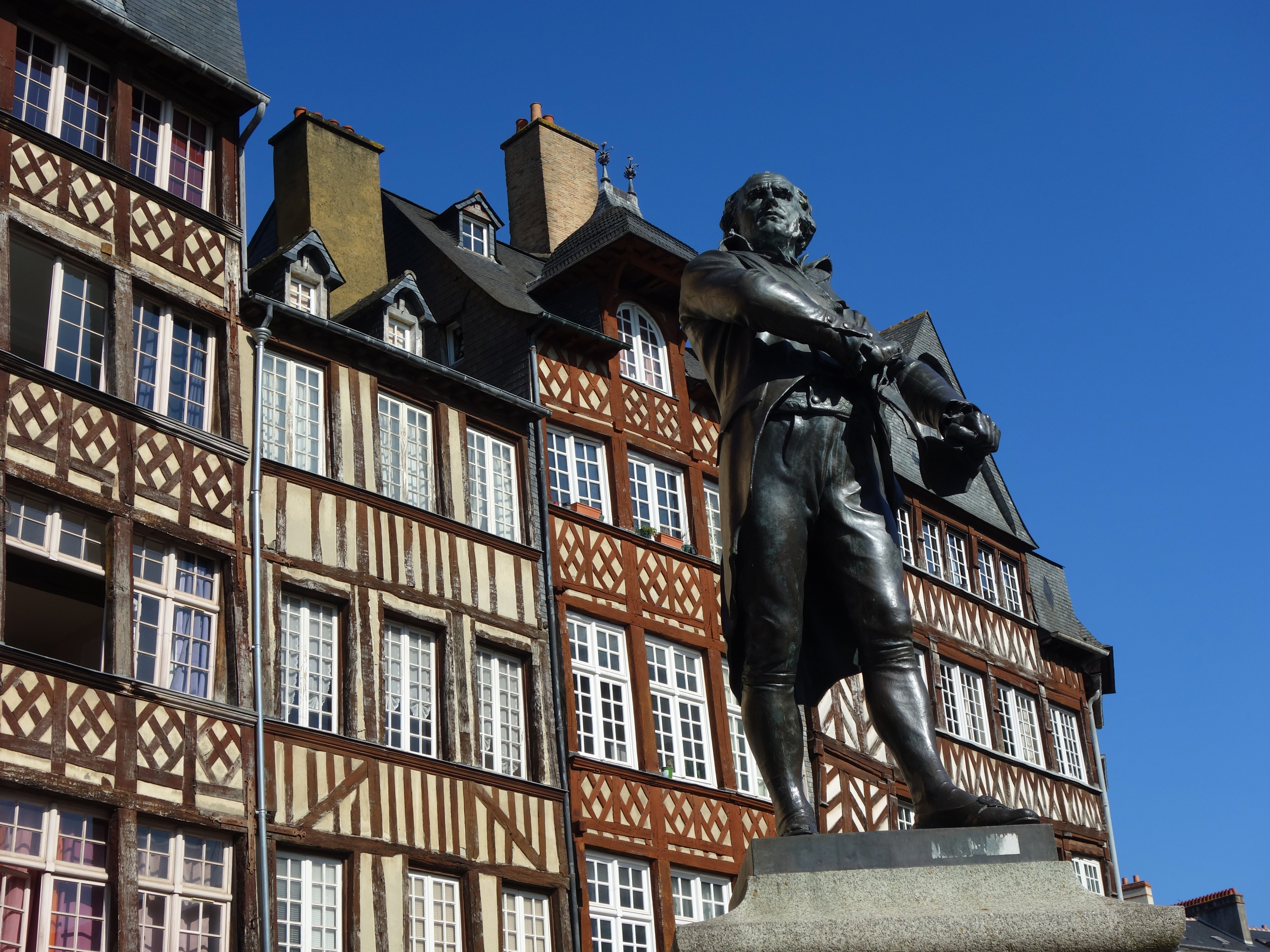
Timber-framed houses in Brittany

Architecture is the process and the product of planning, designing, and constructing buildings or any other structures. Architectural works, in the material form of buildings, are often perceived as cultural symbols and works of art. Historical civilizations are often identified with their surviving architectural achievements.

The earliest surviving written work on architecture is De architectura, by the Roman architect Vitruvius in the early 1st century AD. According to Vitruvius, a good building should satisfy three principles: firmitas, utilitas, venustas, translated as firmness, commodity, and delight. An equivalent in modern English would be:

1. Durability—a building should stand up robustly and remain in good condition.
2. Utility—it should be suitable for the purposes for which it is used.
3. Beauty—it should be aesthetically pleasing.

Building first evolved out of the dynamics between needs (shelter, security, worship, etc.) and means (available building materials and attendant skills). As cultures developed and knowledge began to be formalized through oral traditions and practices, building became a craft, and "architecture" is the name given to the most highly formalized versions of that craft.

== Filmmaking ==
Filmmaking is the process of making a motion picture, from an initial conception and research, through scriptwriting, shooting and recording, animation or other special effects, editing, sound and music work and finally distribution to an audience. It refers broadly to the creation of all types of films, embracing documentary, strains of theatre and literature in film, and poetic or experimental practices, and is often used to refer to video-based processes as well.

== Computer art ==
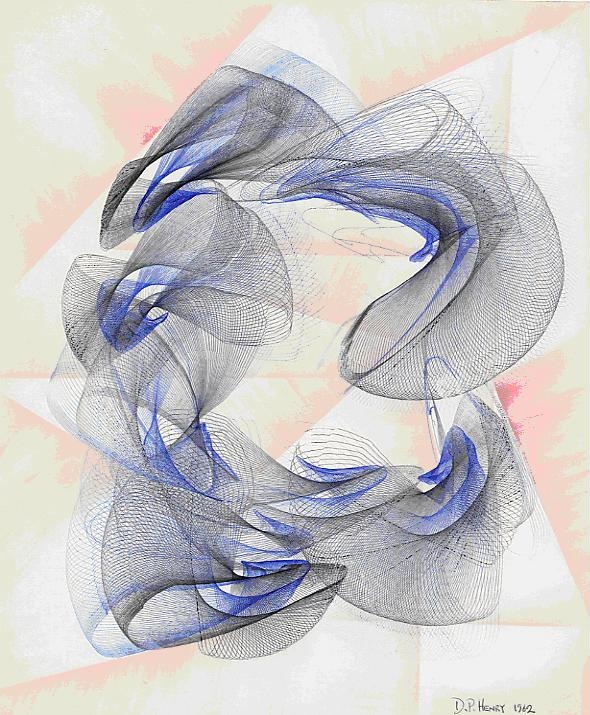
Desmond Paul Henry, Picture by Drawing Machine 1, c. 1960

Visual artists are no longer limited to traditional visual arts media. Computers have been used in the visual arts since the 1960s. Uses include the capturing or creating of images and forms, the editing of those images (including exploring multiple compositions) and the final rendering or printing (including 3D printing).

Computer art is any in which computers play a role in production or display. Such art can be an image, sound, animation, video, CD-ROM, DVD, video game, website, algorithm, performance or gallery installation.

Many traditional disciplines now integrate digital technologies, so the lines between traditional works of art and new media works created using computers have been blurred. For instance, an artist may combine traditional painting with algorithmic art and other digital techniques. As a result, defining computer art by its end product can be difficult. Nevertheless, this type of art appears in art museum exhibits, but can be seen more as a tool, rather than a form as with painting. On the other hand, there are computer-based artworks that belong to a new conceptual and postdigital strand, assuming the same technologies and their social impact as an object of inquiry.

Computer usage has blurred the distinctions between illustrators, photographers, photo editors, 3D modelers, and handicraft artists. Sophisticated rendering and editing software has led to multi-skilled image developers. Photographers may become digital artists. Illustrators may become animators. Handicraft may be computer-aided or use computer-generated imagery as a template. Computer clip art usage has made the distinction between visual arts and page layout less obvious due to the easy access and editing of clip art in the process of paginating a document.

== Plastic arts ==
Plastic arts is a term for art forms that involve physical manipulation of a plastic medium by moulding or modeling, such as sculpture or ceramics. The term has also been applied to all the visual (non-literary, non-musical) arts.

Materials that can be carved or shaped, such as stone, wood, concrete, or steel, have also been included in the narrower definition, since, with appropriate tools, such materials are also capable of modulation. This use of the term "plastic" in the arts is different from Piet Mondrian's use, and with the movement he termed "Neoplasticism".

=== Sculpture ===
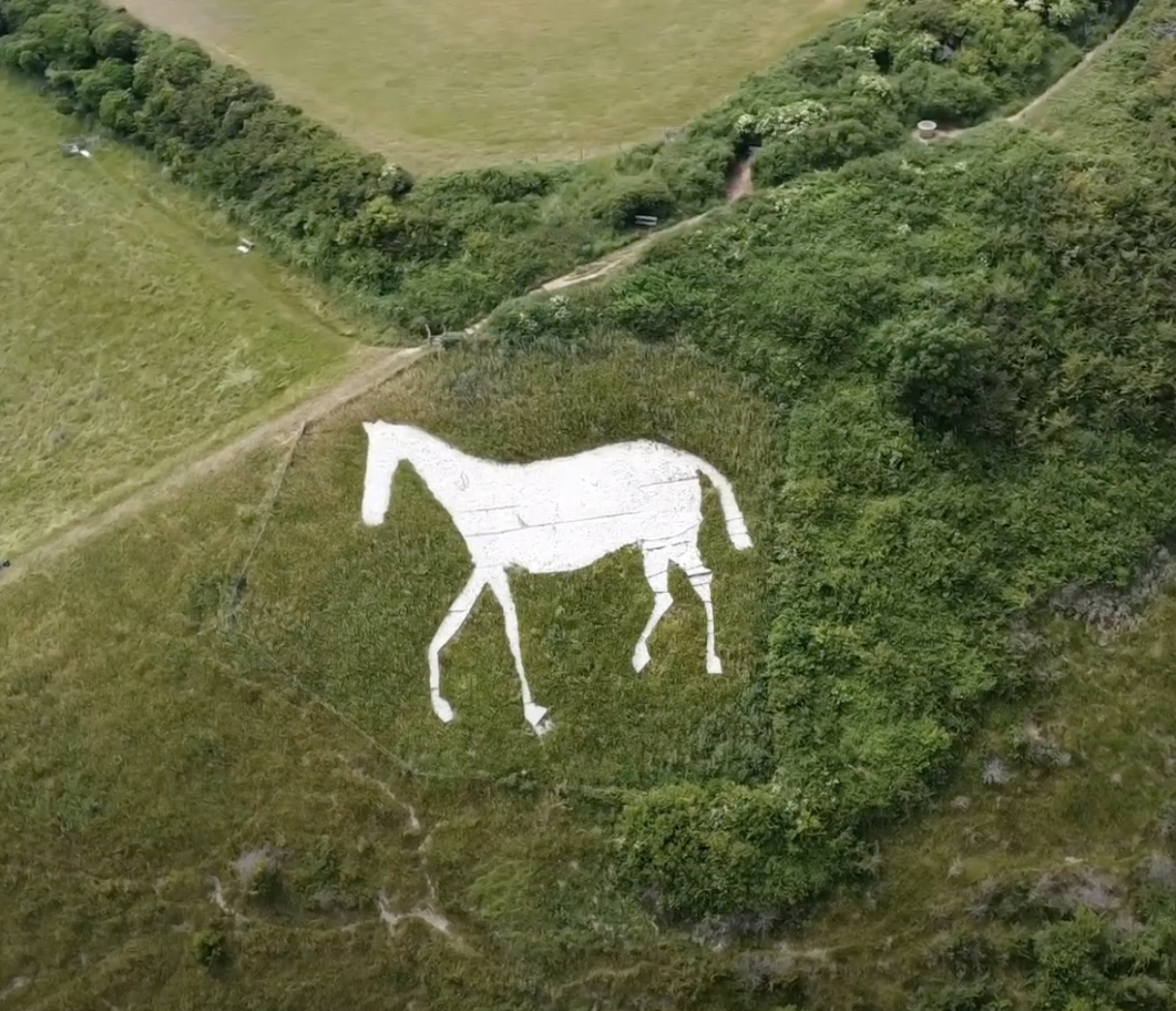
The Litlington White Horse hill figure is an example of land art

Sculpture is three-dimensional artwork created by shaping or combining hard or plastic material, sound, or text and/or light—commonly stone (either rock or marble), clay, metal, glass, or wood. Some sculptures are created directly by finding or carving; others are assembled, built together, and fired, welded, molded, or cast. Sculptures are often painted. A person who creates sculptures is called a sculptor.

The earliest undisputed examples of sculpture belong to the Aurignacian culture, which was located in Europe and southwestern Asia and was active at the beginning of the Upper Paleolithic. As well as producing some of the earliest known cave art, the people of this culture developed finely crafted stone tools, manufacturing pendants, bracelets, ivory beads, and bone flutes, as well as three-dimensional figurines.

Because sculpture involves the use of materials that can be moulded or modulated, it is considered one of the plastic arts. The majority of public art is sculpture. Many sculptures together in a garden setting may be referred to as a sculpture garden. Sculptors do not always make sculptures by hand. With increasing technology in the 20th century and the popularity of conceptual art over technical mastery, more sculptors turned to art fabricators to produce their artworks. With fabrication, the artist creates a design and pays a fabricator to produce it. This allows sculptors to create larger and more complex sculptures out of materials such as cement, metal and plastic that they would not be able to create by hand. Sculptures can also be made with 3D printing technology.

The visual arts also include monumental works that use the natural landscape as a medium, such as land art and hill figures. A notable example is the Litlington White Horse in East Sussex, England. This 20th-century geoglyph is a form of relief sculpture created by the 'subtractive' method of removing turf to reveal the underlying white chalk and requires regular maintenance to preserve its visual contrast against the green downland.

== US copyright definition of visual art ==
In the United States, the law protecting the copyright over a piece of visual art gives a more restrictive definition of "visual art":

A "work of visual art" is —
(1) a painting, drawing, print or sculpture, existing in a single copy, in a limited edition of 200 copies or fewer that are signed and consecutively numbered by the author, or, in the case of a sculpture, in multiple cast, carved, or fabricated sculptures of 200 or fewer that are consecutively numbered by the author and bear the signature or other identifying mark of the author; or
(2) a still photographic image produced for exhibition purposes only, existing in a single copy that is signed by the author, or in a limited edition of 200 copies or fewer that are signed and consecutively numbered by the author.

A work of visual art does not include —
(A)(i) any poster, map, globe, chart, technical drawing, diagram, model, applied art, motion picture or other audiovisual work, book, magazine, newspaper, periodical, data base, electronic information service, electronic publication, or similar publication;
(ii) any merchandising item or advertising, promotional, descriptive, covering, or packaging material or container;
(iii) any portion or part of any item described in clause (i) or (ii);
(B) any work made for hire; or
(C) any work not subject to copyright protection under this title.

== See also ==
- Art materials
- Asemic writing
- Collage
- Conservation and restoration of cultural property
- Crowdsourcing
- Décollage
- Environmental art
- Found object
- Graffiti
- History of art
- Installation art
- Interactive art
- Landscape painting
- Mathematics and art
- Mixed media
- Portrait painting
- Process art
- Recording medium
- Sketch (drawing)
- Sound art
- Theosophy and visual arts
- Vexillography
- Video art
- Visual impairment in art
- Visual poetry
