= Liverpool Plinth =

Public location for displaying art in Liverpool, England

Coordinates: 53.407182°N 2.994823°W

The Liverpool Plinth is an art space that showcases sculptures for a 12-month period on a plinth outside Liverpool Parish Church in Liverpool, UK. The current sculpture is by artist Brigitte Jurack

The art space was first set up in 2018. Each sculpture is chosen via a competition to showcase artists living or working in the north of England (North West, North East, Yorkshire and the Humber). The winner receives £1000.

The project was set up by Liverpool BID Company, working with Liverpool Parish Church along with city gallery and art organisation, dot-art.

== Winners ==
Dates	Winning Sculpture	Artist	Description	Picture
June 2018 – June 2019	Gold Lamé	Tony Heaton	Materials: Fibreglass, steel, automotive paint. Dimensions: 9’9”(h)x4’6”(w) 525(h)x137(w)cm Created: 2014 A suspended, bright gold Invacar which aims to act as a catalyst for discussion and debate on how disabled people are currently viewed and considered within contemporary society, including that of religion and faith. Gold Lamé was originally commissioned by DaDaFest for their festival in 2014.	Gold Lamé by Tony Heaton, sculpture showcased in The Liverpool Plinth in 2018.
June 2019 – July 2020	Split Decision	Sam Shendi	Materials: Bronze, steel, castors Dimensions: 420(w)x120(h)x80(d)cm Split Decision is part of a collection called ‘Only Human’ which as a collective explores the themes of mental health and depression. This particular piece expresses the difficulty in making a decision when you are in a depressed state for whatever length of time. It represents the fear of taking a direction, making a choice, to move from a place a person is currently in. The colours are emotions so for example, red being anger or sexuality, green for hope and innocence, pink for childhood and a sweetness etc. The central figure is black and blue, using the expression ‘black and blue’ for pain. So in this confusion of being unable to make a choice we feel this pain, black and blue, unaware of the bright side of the options or opportunities that lie before us in either direction. This is represented by the legs stretched out and the colours presenting those opportunities.	Split Decision by Sam Shendi, sculpture showcased in The Liverpool Plinth in 2019
July 2020 – July 2021	Tidal Shame	Gail Dooley	Materials: Stoneware Ceramic, Metal and Found Objects Dimensions: 168(h)x93(w)x80(d)cm The ceramic bird depicted in Tidal Shame is a gannet, a sea bird which is common to the city of Liverpool. Trapped by authentic sea plastic and detritus collected from UK shores, this sculptural installation presents a striking image of our global marine problem and the real concern we must have of protecting animals. Not only does Tidal Shame showcase the effects that plastic waste has on the natural world, the sculpture highlights the impact that waste has on the birds that inhabit it. Tidal Shame echoes the importance of celebrating our fellow creatures.	Tidal Shame by Gail Dooley, sculpture showcased in The Liverpool Plinth in 2020
July 2021 – July 2022	Jimmy	Faith Bebbington	Materials: Plastic milk bottle coat, steel, willow and wire inner framework Dimensions: 175(h)x75(w)x155(d)cm Jimmy was initially born in 2013 when Bebbington created Horse Power – a permanent sculpture commissioned by the Canal & River Trust for the National Waterways Museum in Ellesmere Port. Horse Power was a fibreglass resin piece that celebrates the heritage of traditional horse drawn boating and led to National Waterways Museum inviting Bebbington to develop a horse boating themed lantern project to engage the local community. Shortly after the project began, Bebbington fell ill and the life-sized framework for the horse lantern sat in her studio for many years. After the world went into lock-down in 2020, Bebbington decided to complete Jimmy using the cladding of the original framework with added thousands of plastic milk bottles that were washed, cut up and then stitched onto the wire framework. Named after a retired working horse that Bebbington loved to ride regularly as a child, Jimmy was a spirited, rather stubborn horse who would regularly buck riders off! Jimmy now represents those horse drawn boats that were one of the main forms of transporting goods in the UK around 1740. The setting of The Liverpool Plinth is an ideal home for Jimmy as the sculpture now looks towards the Waterfront and the Leeds Liverpool Canal link, which has been open to boats since April 2019.	Jimmy by Faith Bebbington, sculpture showcased in The Liverpool Plinth in 2021
July 2022 - July 2023	2400	Katie McGuire	St Helens based contemporary sculptor, Katie McGuire, is the winning artist from the Open Call, the youngest sculptor to be selected for The Liverpool Plinth. Her work explores the importance of materiality through the theme of industrialism. As a female, Northern, working-class artist, McGuire speaks of her work as exploring her heritage through the depiction and reproduction of industry in an artistic and aesthetic approach. The winning sculpture, 2400, is created solely by hand knitting and is an emblem of the laboured approach of those working on Liverpool’s ships, docks and throughout the slave trade. The sculpture takes an industrial material, backer rod, out of its restricted and internal environment and manipulates it, through knitting, to provide it with a new context. The sculpture will symbolise the chains used on ships or at docks, which are a symbol of a ship’s strength.	
2023–Present	The Boy With The Knife / Carnation	Brigitte Jurack	The sculpture serves as a meditation on the Russian invasion of Ukraine is to be unveiled on The Liverpool Plinth. Boy with ~~knife~~ carnation by Wirral based artist Brigitte Jurack is the sixth sculpture to be installed onto the Plinth. Boy with ~~knife~~ carnation is a piece originally conceived as a meditation on fear and uncertainty and the lingering potential of violence. The knife in the original sculpture is replaced with a carnation, which will be replaced to change colour throughout the year. In Ukrainian culture, different coloured carnations are used to symbolise different feelings and emotions. Red carnations, for example, are given on 8 May to veterans, while white are given as a sign of pure love and pink to mothers to celebrate undying love.	
