= Tony Heaton =

British sculptor (born 1954)

Tony Heaton OBE
- Born: Anthony James Heaton; 11 October 1954 (age 71); Preston, Lancashire, England
- Education: Lancaster University
- Known for: Sculpture
- Movement: Disability art
- Awards: OBE (2013)

Anthony James Heaton OBE (born 11 October 1954) is a British sculptor, disability rights activist and arts administrator, who was appointed an OBE in 2013 for services to the arts and the disability arts movement. He was CEO of the arts charity Shape until March 2017. In 2012, he won the competition to produce an installation celebrating Channel 4's involvement in the London 2012 Paralympic Games. This produced his 'Monument for the Unintended Performer'.

== Early years ==
Heaton was born in Preston, Lancashire, in 1954, the son of a coppersmith. When, at the age of 16, a motor bike accident left him with a spinal injury, he switched from a comprehensive school to a local arts college at Southport. From 1972, he was self-employed as artist, sign writer, disc jockey, record shop proprietor, progressive rock band member and mural painter. According to a Disability Arts Online profile, at this period "Heaton gathered enormous expertise and self-reliance whilst appearing to drift aimlessly". In 1986 he enrolled on a visual arts degree at Lancaster University whilst earning a living as a sign-painter.

A contemporary of Andy Goldsworthy, Heaton experimented with environmental sculpture on sands at Morecambe Bay. Lancaster's head of sculpture, Paul Hatton, noted that the marks left by Heaton were immediately distinguishable from the footprints of his fellow students and urged him to develop work about this. Heaton states that, "A chance comment about how the marks left in the sand by my feet and crutches made my tracks immediately identifiable became the catalyst for a whole series of works relating to disability and my interaction with the environment". Heaton exhibited a plaster cast of his feet and stick imprints, his first piece of disability art.

== Artistic career ==
Heaton's early sculptures often use what Disability Arts in London magazine described as "the everyday impedimenta of disability: collecting cans, NHS wheelchairs, X-rays, Part M of the Building Regulations". But his work contradicts the normal associations of such materials by turning them into "profound and joyously witty statements about the nature of our oppression".

An early piece, "Springback" (1990), is an assemblage including a spinal X-Ray juxtaposed above the shock absorber springs of a scrapped motorcycle, referring to the accident which caused his impairment and the metal strengthening spring placed inside his spine.

'Shaken..not Stirred' (1991) consisted of a seven-feet high pyramid of 1,760 charity collecting cans, its ascending ranks of red plastic referring to the hierarchical nature of the charity system. The whole edifice was brought crashing to the ground when Heaton threw an artificial leg at it, suggesting that the hierarchical system could be destroyed by the collective power of disabled people. As his work has developed, it has embodied ideas about disability and impairment. For instance, "Split" (1995) is a woodcarving made from a piece of ash discarded by a wood turner as useless because it has a shake; a fault running through it. Heaton saw this as "indicative of a society that sees only perfection and disregards all that is damaged or perceived as impaired".

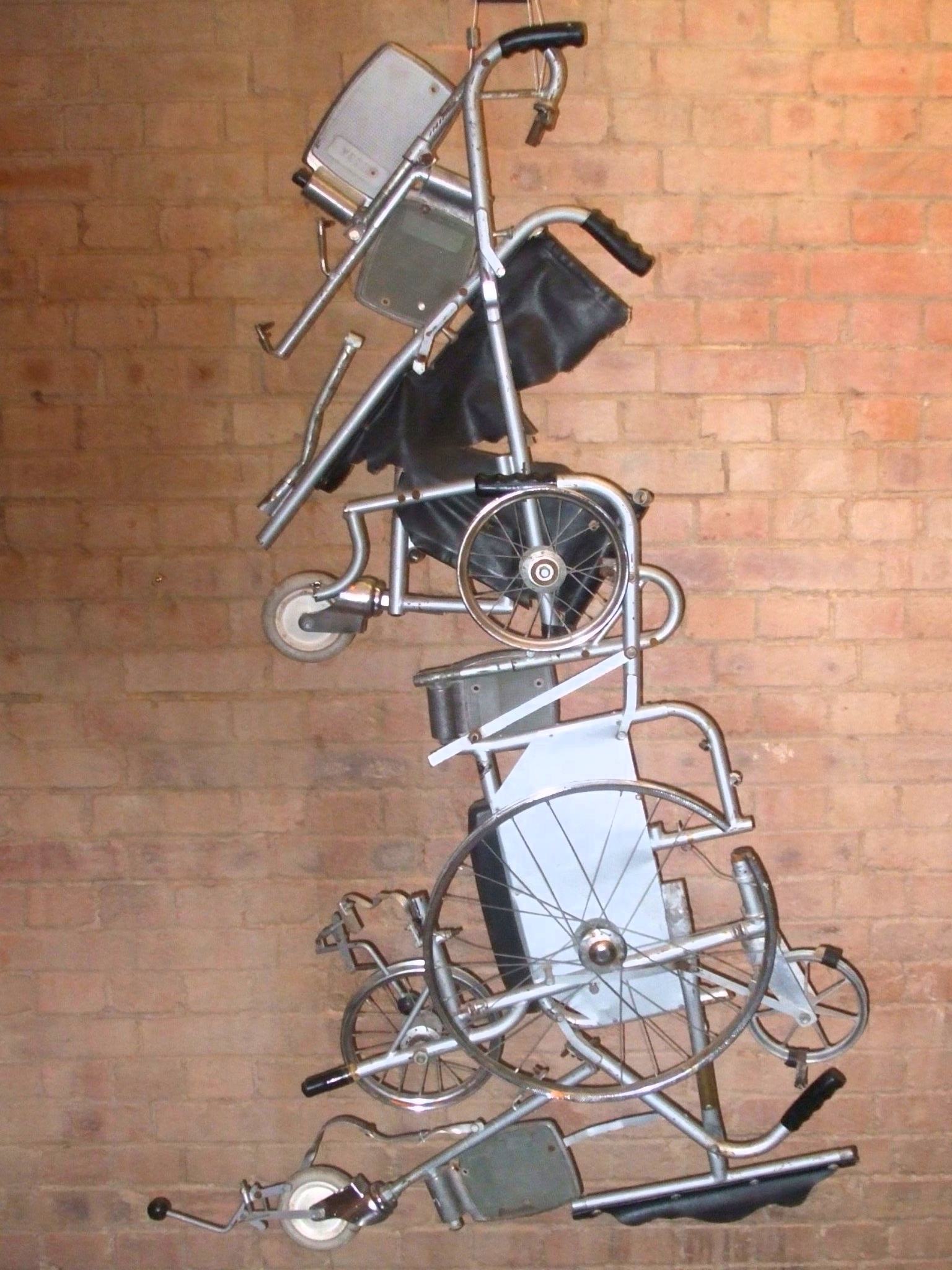
Great Britain from a Wheelchair

The 1994 sculpture, 'Great Britain from a Wheelchair' is a map of Britain made from two grey NHS wheelchairs. "A delightful game, it forms a wonderful repudiation of the value judgement ('This is for some tragic bastard', in Heaton's words) implicit in the wheelchairs." An image of this work was chosen by the National Disability Arts Collection and Archive as an example of work from the 'golden age' of disability arts. During the 2012 Paralympics Heaton was invited to redesign 'Great Britain From a Wheelchair' as lecterns for Lord Coe and Sir Phillip Craven during the opening and closing ceremonies.

In 2012, he was commissioned to produce 'Monument to the Unintended Performer', an installation for the Big 4 sculpture sited outside Channel Four's offices. It brought together three elements in addition to the Big 4: the first based on the classical Greek sculpture Discobolus, the discus thrower, evoking the spirit of the Olympics; the second element, a circle, representing the wheel of the international symbol of access; and lastly, the introduction of gold, silver and bronze considers hierarchy. Heaton stated: "I wanted to use the structure of the Big 4 as one of four elements that would fuse together to form a new cohesive piece - which would provoke thought and celebrate Channel 4's involvement and commitment to the Paralympics. The subtext is the assertion that disabled people are almost always the object of scrutiny and curiosity."

'Gold Lamé', included in the 2014 exhibition Art of The Lived Experiment, is an invalid car painted gold. The title puns on the word "lame". Heaton states that the Invacar has been "transformed from prosthetic to sculpture, transmuted from spazz blue to gold, from Lame to Lamé", mirroring his own life adjustments, where he says, "I transmuted from biker to invalid". Gold Lamé also appeared at the Church of Our Lady and Saint Nicholas, Liverpool as the inaugural winner of the Liverpool Plinth.

== Holton Lee ==
From 1997 to 2007, Heaton was based in Dorset, as Director of the Holton Lee Trust which offers a mix of environmental, artistic and spiritual activities, with short stay residential facilities for Disabled people, in an SSSI comprising 350 acres of woodland, reed bed and heath land landscape adjacent to Poole Harbour.

Heaton developed a ten-year strategic plan for the organisation: a contemporary arts and education programme based on a series of accessible buildings including a gallery and artists' studios, which would enable a new programme of artistic work, a growth in residential capacity and a focus for disability arts. All the buildings would use local materials blending in with Holton Lee's natural surroundings.

The first of these, Faith House gallery, designed by Tony Fretton was hailed by Jonathan Glancey in the Guardian as 'one of the most beautiful new buildings in Britain'.

In 2002, Heaton organised the DA21 Disability Arts Conference at Holton Lee. He also planned the inaugural conference to discuss the establishment of what would become the National Disability Arts Collection and Archive. The idea then envisaged was to create a purpose-built archive as part of the developing Holton Lee campus. This was abandoned after Heaton moved on. NDACA will now take the form of an interactive website and catalogue, after receiving funding of nearly £1 million from the Heritage Lottery Fund in 2015.

== Shape ==
In 2007 Heaton became CEO of Shape Arts, the arts and disability charity founded by dancer Gina Levete. He brought to the organisation a new emphasis on disability arts and professional opportunities for artists.

He instituted the Adam Reynolds Memorial Bursary, which provides 3-month bursaries for disabled artists to undertake residencies at leading visual arts institutions. These have included the Victoria and Albert Museum, Camden Arts Centre, Spike Island, The Baltic Centre for Contemporary Art, the Bluecoat Gallery and New Art Gallery Walsall. The bursary is named after the late sculptor, with whom Heaton had a close friendship. Early winners were Caroline Cardus, Aaron Williamson, Sally Booth and Noëmi Lakmaier.

He also created the Shape Open, an annual open exhibition of artwork by disabled and non-disabled artists created in response to a disability-centred theme. The exhibition's patron is Yinka Shonibare, at whose Guest Projects space in Hackney, London the 2016 exhibition took place.

Heaton has announced that he will stand down as CEO in 2017 and become chair of the organisation.

== Order of the British Empire ==
Heaton was appointed an OBE in the Queen's Birthday Honours, 2013, for services to the arts and the disability arts movement.

== Key works ==
Title	Year	Material
Six Circles	1989	Carved elmwood
Springback	1990	X-ray, bulldog clips, steel motor cycle suspension springs, base
Shaken Not Stirred	1991	Red charity collecting tins, artificial leg, Jungle Doc Dr. Marten boot
Great Britain from a Wheelchair	1994	Wheelchair parts
Split	1995	Ash wood
Greymares	1997	Laser-cut stainless steel, ceramic bricks
Personal column	1998	Carved willow
White on White: Barbara, Johnny and the Quiet Revolution	2002	Conservators' cotton gloves, mount board
Serpent Form	2004	Carrara marble
Zenmen	2004	Carrara marble
Rearranged Penis	2006	Porcelain and paper clay
Loop	2005	Carrara marble
squarinthecircle?	2007	Portland stone
Monument to the Unintended Performer	2012	Stainless steel, neon, polyurethane, LED
Gold Lamé	2014	Fibreglass, steel, perspex, rubber, gold automotive paint

== Exhibitions ==
- 1988 Regional Finalist, Unipart Reflections of Technology Award for Original Sculpture: Exhibition at Yorkshire Sculpture Park, Breton Hall, Yorkshire
- 1990 'Out of Ourselves', Diorama Gallery, London
- 1991 Euroday Disability Arts Festival, Installation 'Shaken Not Stirred', featured on BBC TV
- 1995 'Unleashed - Images and Experience of Disability', Laing Art Gallery, Newcastle upon Tyne
- 1995 'Exposed...Great Britain from a Wheelchair', solo exhibition, Diorama Gallery, London; featured on 'From the Edge', BBC TV
- 2002 Disability Arts at ICI - head office Lancaster Square, London, Exhibition of 'Great Britain from a wheelchair' and 'Zen Men'
- 2005 Sherbourne House, Dorset - joint exhibition with Peter Ursem
- 2008 Tate Modern - Architecture Inside Out - Ro-Tate a collaborative intervention/performance in the Turbine Hall
- 2010 Flux - The Brewhouse Gallery, Taunton, Somerset
- 2015 Art of the Lived Experiment - DaDaFEst, Liverpool and UICA Urban Institute for Contemporary Arts. Grand Rapids, Michigan, USA
- 2016 Art, Life, Activism: Contemporary art and the Politics of Disability. - Attenborough Arts Centre Leicester. Co-curator and exhibitor.

== Commissions ==
- 1997 'Grey Mares' - Public Sculpture commission for Manchester City Council, as a result of a competition organised by Community Arts North West, sited at Beswick
- 2006 Art Plus Award for Art in Public Places, a £50,000 commission to create: squarinthecircle?, a permanent public sculpture for Portsmouth University School of Architecture
- 2012 LOCOG - London Organising Committee for the Olympic Games - commission to create sculptural lecterns for Lord Sebastian Coe and Sir Philip Craven based on the sculpture: Great Britain from a Wheelchair
- 2012 Winner - Channel 4 TV competitive commission to create a sculptural intervention with the Big 4 structure outside the Channel 4 building to celebrate the Paralympics
- 2014 Commissioned by Channel 4 TV to create the film Breathe Nothing of Slaughter as part of the 14-18 Commemoration of World War One
- 2014 Commissioned to create the sculpture Gold Lamé for the exhibition Art of the Lived Experiment, Bluecoat Gallery Liverpool

== Residencies ==
- 1995 'Buried Overground', Collaborative Workshop with ARC Leeds
- 1996 Sculpture residency: East Midlands Shape
- 2004-12 Arco Arte, Carrara, Italy - Annual marble carving workshops with Boutros Romhein

== Awards ==
- 1988 Regional Finalist, Unipart Reflections of Technology Award for Original Sculpture
- 2006 Art Plus Award for Art in Public Places
- OBE, 2013 Queen's Birthday Honours
- 2018 The Liverpool Plinth Winner

== Other information ==
Heaton was chosen by artist Tanya Raabe, in an interview with BBC Ouch, as one of her ideal dinner guests, along with Michael Caine, Frida Kahlo, her husband Diego Rivera, "because he's a womaniser and I think he'd get on marvellously with Tony Heaton and her best friend, Ann Young".
