= Maastricht Hours =

- British Library
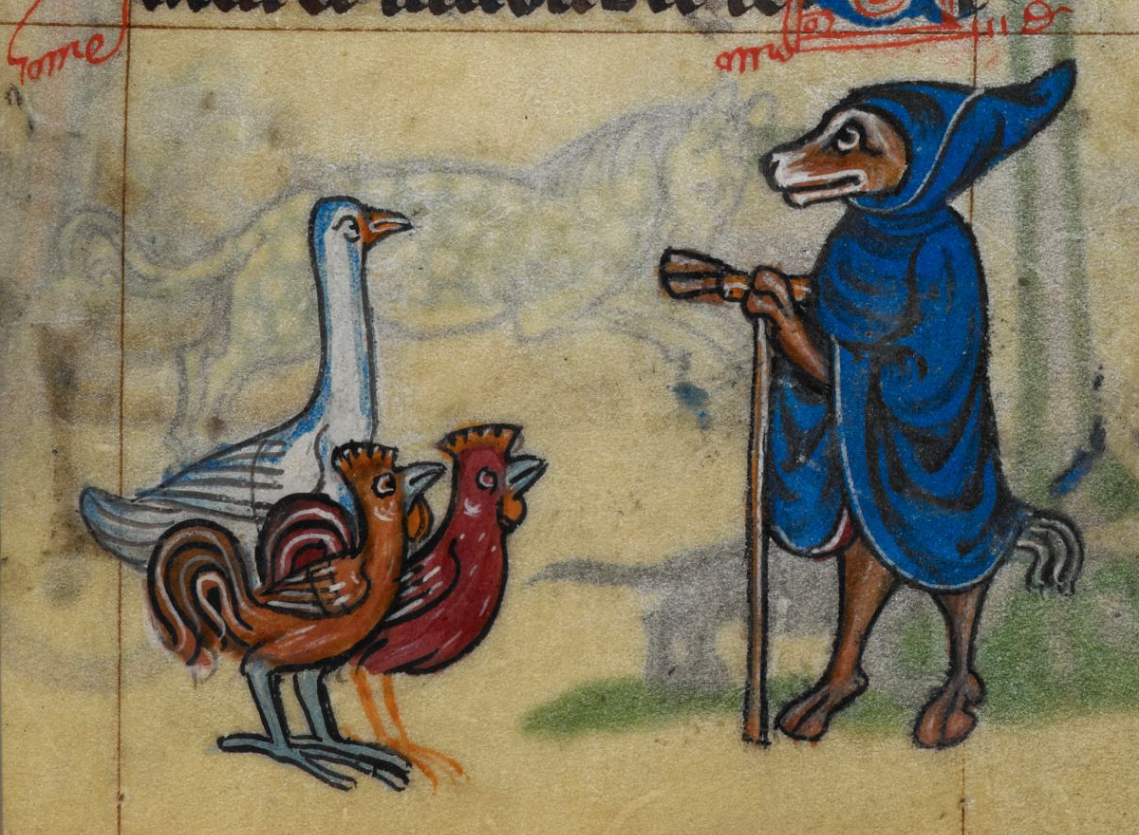
- Place of origin: Meusan county
- Language(s): Latin and French
- Compiled by: First quarter of the 14th century
- Format: 95 × 70 mm

The Maastricht Hours is a book of hours that was produced in the vicinity of Liège early in the 14th century and is now among the Stowe manuscripts of the British Library. It is known for its colourful and imaginative miniatures, often on animal themes. It has been fully digitised and is available on the British Library website.

== Codicological description ==
The manuscript is composed of 273 paper pages. There are 12 endpapers in modern paper, 6 at the front and 6 at the back. The text block measures 50 x 30 mm. The text is written in a column of 13 lines per page. The parts in Latin is written in Blackletter. The Maastricht Hours also contains some prayers in French.

== History ==
The manuscript probably comes from the Meusan county (region of Liège). It was probably commissioned by a lady of the aristocracy who is represented in several places in the manuscript (f18r, f130v, f140r, f157v and f256r). The name "Book of Hours of Maastricht" remains enigmatic. Although the calendar does contain saints typical of the Meuse-Rhine region, it lacks important feasts specific to Maastricht, such as the translation of Servais of Tongres (7 June) and the feast of the founders of the church Monulph of Maastricht and Gondulph of Maastricht (16 July).

== Content ==
- 2v-13r: Calendar of saints
- 18r-139r: Little Office of the Blessed Virgin Mary
- 140r-157r: Penitential Psalms
- 158r-172v: Canticles of the Degrees
- 172v-187r: Litany of All Saints
- 188r-254r: Office of the Dead
- 256r-273r: Various Prayers in French

=== Calendar of saints ===
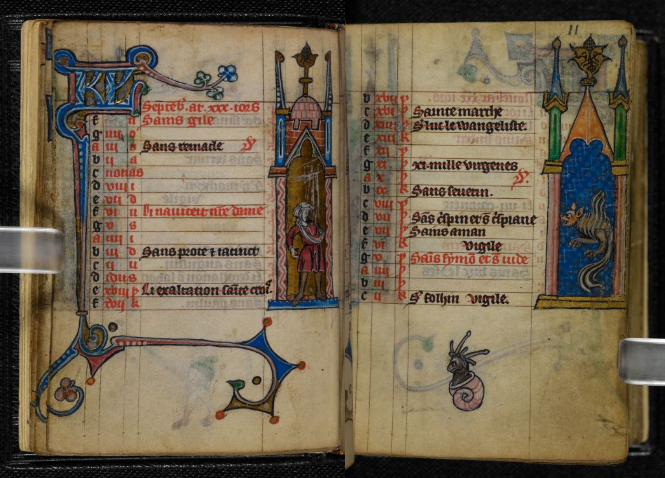
Two pages of the calendar of saints. A folio is missing between f10v (September) and f11r (October). It depicts some saints from the Meuse-Rhine region such as: Remaclus (September 3), Severin (October 23), and Amand (October 26).

The book contains an illuminated calendar with two pages for each month. The folio for the second half of September and the first half of October are missing. The calendar pages have four columns. The first contains the letter of the dominicale, and the second and third indicate the day of the month expressed in calends. The fourth column contains the fixed feasts and the feasts of the saints.

Each page has an architectural decoration in the right margin with a figure illustrating the work of the month on the verso and an image of the sign of the zodiac of the month on the recto. Due to the missing folio, there is no drawing of the zodiac sign of September (Libra) nor work of the month of October. drôleries have been added in the lower margin of the verso, such as a monkey running for the month of March. The initials "KL" end with ornaments that fill the entire margin. Gold was widely used for the illumination of the calendar.

=== Little Office of the Holy Virgin ===
The Marian Hours are preceded by five full-page miniatures. All the miniatures are placed in an architectural frame with medallions at the corners representing figures or angels. gold leaf has also been generously used in these miniatures. We see successively:

- f13v: Saint Catherine and Saint Agnes with male figures holding scrolls in the medallions
- f14v: Two female saints, perhaps Saint Agatha and Saint Saint Apollonia, surrounded by angels playing music in the medallions
- f15v: The birth of Christ with angels playing music in the medallions
- f16v: The Announcement to the Shepherds with the messenger in the upper left medallion and men with scrolls in the other medallions.
- f17v: The Adoration of the Magi with quatrefoil instead of medallions. The quatrefoils represent angels playing music.

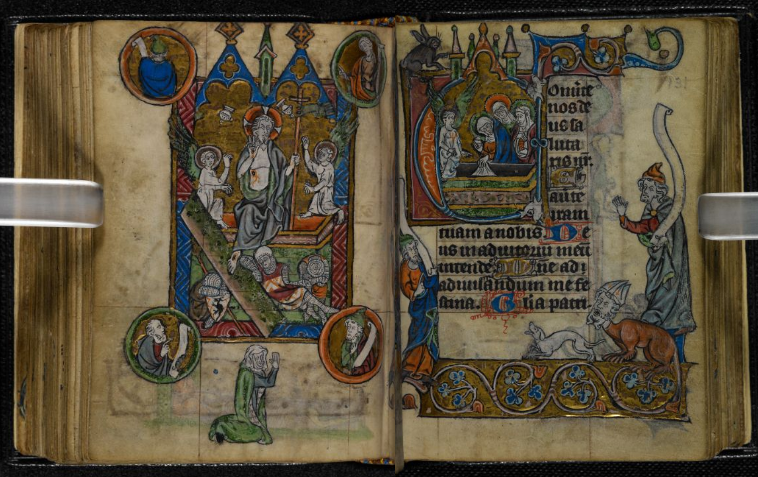
Double page at Compline (f130v-f131r). On the left the Resurrection , on the right the three Marys. At the bottom left perhaps a portrait of the owner of the prayer book. On the right two men with parchments, a dog, and another dog with a bishop's head.

The Marian Hours themselves open with an illuminated Initial 10 lines high, decorated with a Virgin and Child. The other prayer times are always preceded by a full-page miniature depicting a scene from the Passion of Christ on the back of the page. The initial on the recto side (7 to 8 lines high) is always illuminated, as are the miniatures illustrating the scenes from the Passion narrative. On the page with the illuminated initial, there is always an architectural border with saints or other figures, and the recto side is closed at the bottom by a border decorated with floral motifs and medallions, sometimes linked to other representations. In addition, isolated figures or grotesques are sometimes added in the margins. The Marian Hours contain the following miniatures and initials:

- f18r: Matins: Initials (10 lines) with the Virgin and Child
- f52v-f53r: Lauds: Miniature with the arrest of Christ and initial with the derision of Christ
- f71v-f72r: Prime: Miniature with Christ before Annas and Caiaphas and initial with Pontius Pilate washing his hands (in innocence)
- f88v-f89r: Terce: Miniature with the flagellation of Christ and in the initial Christ stripped of his clothes and mocked
- f98v-f99r : Sext: Miniature with the carrying of the cross and in the initial Christ is stripped of his upper garment
- f107v-f108r : Nones : Miniature with the crucifixion with, in the medallions, the symbols of the four evangelists. In the illuminated initial, two men with a ladder preparing for the descent from the cross.
- f116v-f117r : Vespers: Miniature with the descent from the cross with again the symbols of the evangelists in the medallions. In the initial the washing and embalming of the body of Christ are represented.
- f130v-f131r: Compline: In the miniature, the resurrection of Christ and in the initial the three Marys at the empty tomb.

=== Other parts ===
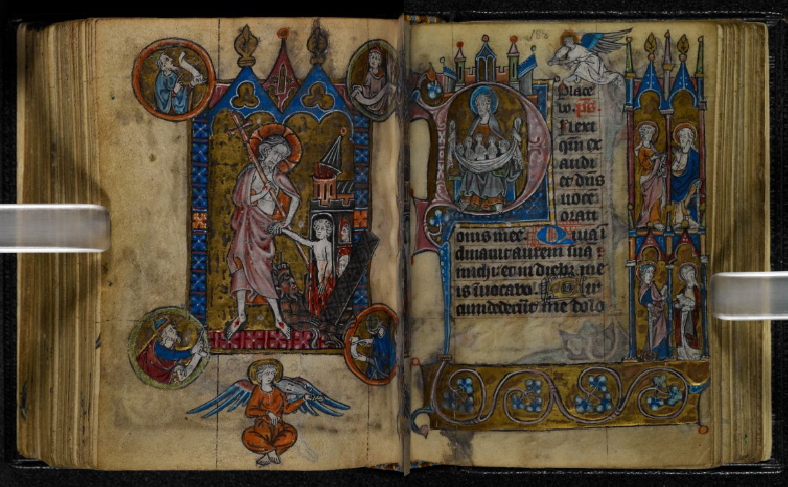
Double page at the Office of the Dead (f187v-f188r): Christ in limbo and souls in Abraham's bosom.

In the following parts of the Book of Hours, full-page miniatures are again used, sometimes accompanied by an illuminated initial, to introduce the various texts.

- f139v-f140r: Penitential Psalms: Miniature with a representation of the Noli me tangere. In the initial, a blessed woman
- f157v: Canticles of the degrees: Miniature with a woman (perhaps the sponsor) praying before a crucifix surrounded by angels playing music in the medallions. No initial
- f187v-f188r: Office of the Dead: Miniature of Christ visiting the limbo of hell and in the initial a representation of the souls resting in the "bosom of Abraham".
- f255v-256r: The prayers in French are preceded by a miniature retracing the life of Theophilus of Adana, who is said to have made a pact with the devil. The initial shows a man praying.

== Marginal decoration ==
In addition to the described miniatures and illuminated initials, there are numerous decorated and inhabited initials three lines high as well as small capital letters one line high, colored and often decorated with fleuron motifs. Almost all the large initials (three lines) develop into an exuberant marginal decoration, generally inhabited by animals and fantastical creatures. The pages on which no large initials are painted nevertheless present abundant marginal decoration with very diverse themes, ranging from religious to scabrous (drolleries), in which animals often play a central role. On page 243v, a donkey operates a catapult to throw stones while dogs attack a castle occupied by monkeys. On page 240r, a monkey captures humans with a bird net. On page 51r, a lady consults a monkey doctor while on 59r a loving couple is in the garden. Finally, on page 62r, a lady converses with an elegant monkey.

Each page presents different scenes and characters. Even in serious miniatures, such as the flagellation of Christ, there is a monkey in the lower margin.

Thanks to the many illustrations, the manuscript provides a wealth of information on medieval musical instruments, weapons and warfare, agriculture, hunting, craft activities, clothing and many other aspects of medieval life.

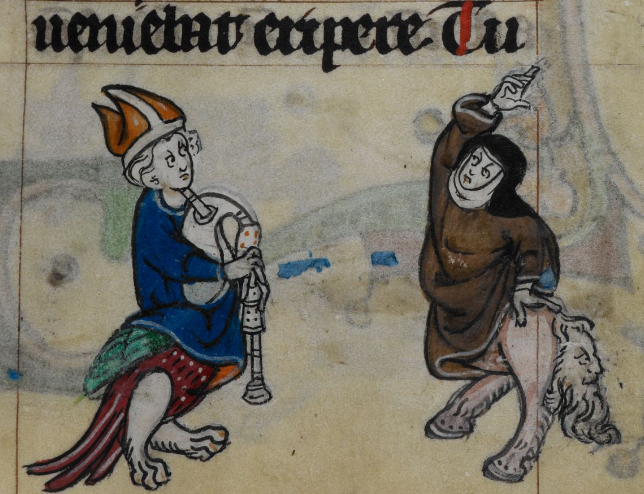
Bishop playing music and dancing nun, both with animal bodies (f49r)

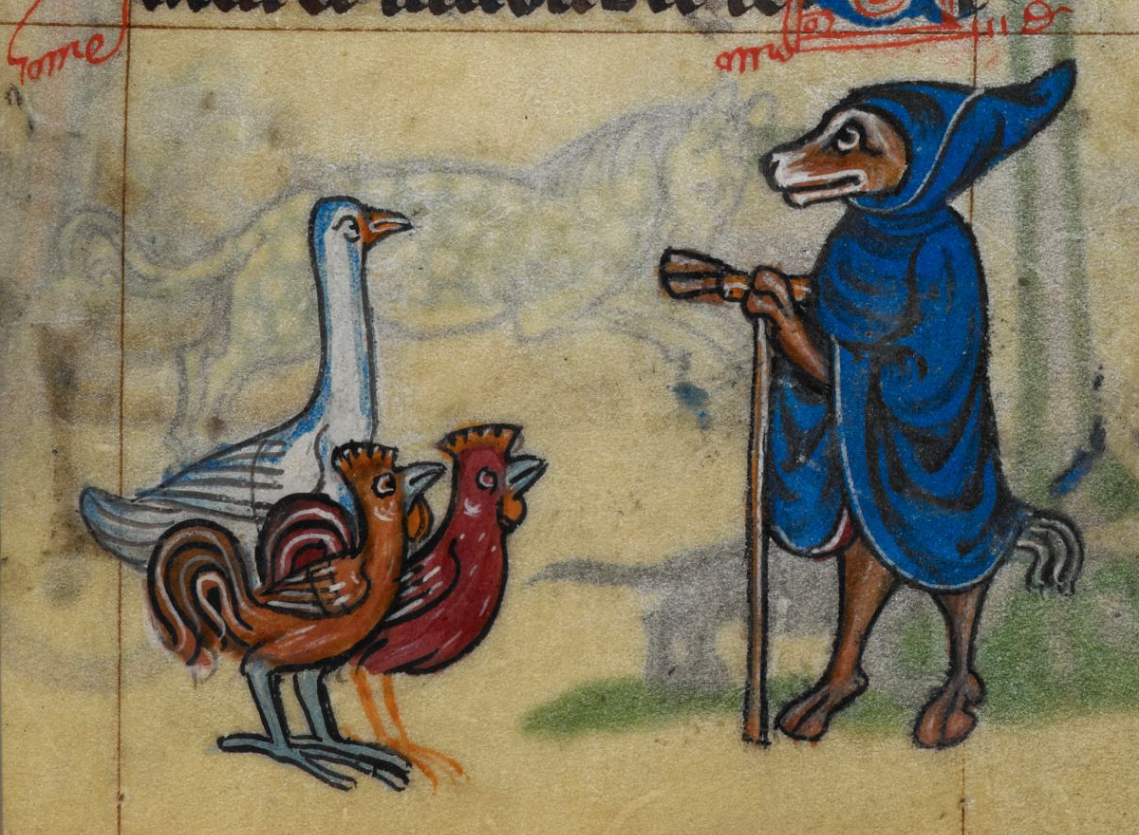
The fox preaching to the geese (f84r)

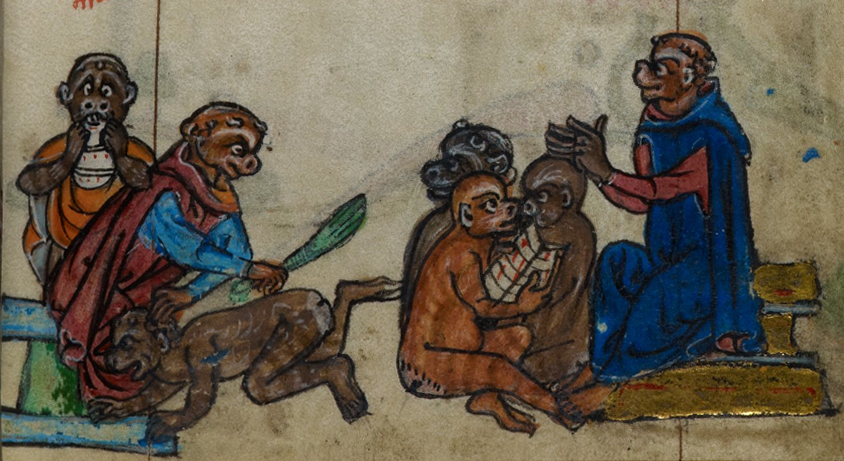
The monkey school (f109r)

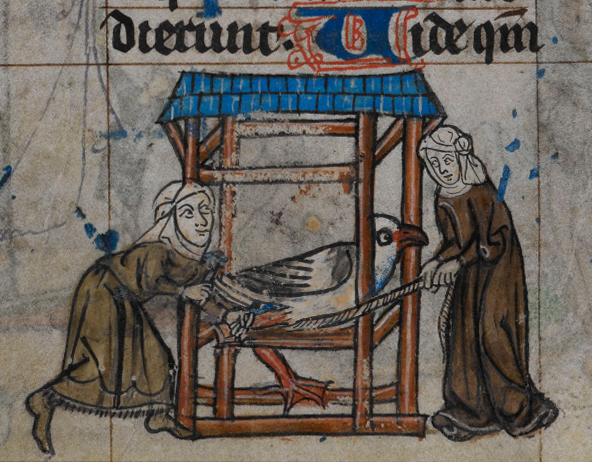
Women who captured a large bird (f112v)
