= Shape Arts =

Arts organisation

- Formation: 1976
- Registration no.: 279184
- Legal status: Charity
- Headquarters: Buckinghamshire New University
- Location: High Wycombe, UK
- Revenue: £2,063,770 (2021)
- Staff: 8 (2021)
- Website: https://www.shapearts.org.uk/

Shape Arts or Shape is a disability-led arts organisation, working across the UK and internationally, funded by Arts Council England. Shape works to improve access to culture for disabled people by providing opportunities for disabled creatives, training cultural institutions to be more open to disabled people, and through running participatory arts and development programmes.

== History ==
Shape was founded by Gina Levete MBE in 1976 with project funding from the Gulbenkian Foundation. Tony Heaton OBE was CEO from 2008-2017, the current CEO is David Hevey.

Shape was informed by the political activism of the 1960s. Disability arts grew out of the disability rights movement, and the wider struggle by disabled people for equality and the right to participate in all aspects of society.

== Activities ==
- The Shape Open: an annual exhibition of artwork by disabled and non-disabled artists created in response to a disability-centred theme. Usually held in high-profile, artist-led spaces.
- NDACA the 'National Disability Arts Collection and Archive': a £1-million digital archive chronicling the history of disability arts in the UK.
- Adam Reynolds Award (formally known as Adam Reynolds Memorial Bursary): a flagship art award, designed to support a mid-career disabled artist or artists, looking to develop their practice and build their profile by offering funds and support.
- Emergent: delivered in partnership with Baltic Centre for Contemporary Art, the programme offers one early-career disabled artists a three-month hybrid residency and a £5k bursary. In addition, both organisations offer a cohort of shortlisted artists a tailored package of support.
- Shape Collection: an expanding collection currently holding over 20 works on long-term or permanent loan, it includes sculptural pieces by the late Adam Reynolds, and the Incarnate photographic series by Tom Shakespeare. Other artists include Jason Wilsher-Mills, Caroline Cardus, James Lake and Tony Heaton OBE.
- Until April 2022, Shape Arts and Artsadmin delivered Unlimited, an arts commissioning programme offering talented disabled artists funds and mentoring support to develop, produce and show ambitious work. As of April 2022, Unlimited are now an independent company.

Shape Arts arranges exhibitions, awards bursaries to promising disabled artists and provides training in media and marketing skills. From December 2012 - Spring 2013, a pop-up exhibition entitled 'Shape in the City' was presented in the centre of the City of London. Shape had a temporary exhibition space for two years at Westfield Stratford City from 2012 - 2014.

In 2024, Shape Arts exhibited Crip Arte Spazio: The DAM in Venice at CREA during the Venice Biennale with funding from Arts Council England and the British Council. The exhibition was inspired by the Diaspora Pavilion that featured artists from diasporic backgrounds from the UK, and featured work by eight disabled artists and the photography archive of Keith Armstrong. Joe Turnbull describes the exhibition: "The show very much tells the story of how the Disability Arts Movement contributed to the UK’s disability human rights struggle, culminating in the Disability Discrimination Act 1995, which enshrined several rights for disabled people in law."

== Notable artists ==
- Yinka Shonibare CBE, who was a Patron of their annual Shape Open, is a disabled artist who worked as an arts development officer at Shape in the 90s. Shonibare acknowledges the role that Shape Arts played in his early career: "I worked for Shape three days a week, running workshops on singing, dancing or visual arts for disabled and older people in day centres and hospitals. The job meant I could afford to rent a studio and it gave me organisational and fundraising skills." In 2013, Shonibare was announced as patron of the annual Shape 'Open' exhibition where disabled and non-disabled artists are invited to submit work in response to a disability-focused theme.
- Guy Evans, a founding member of Echo City, is a progressive rock drummer with Subterraneans who worked at Shape Arts in an administrative role and as a workshop leader.
- Kelly Knox, one of Britain's leading disabled fashion models, worked at Shape Arts for several years as a programme co-ordinator.

== Financial Support ==
Renowned British contemporary artists have donated artworks to Shape to raise money for the charity through an auction at Bonhams. Funds raised from the sale were matched by the Arts Council’s Catalyst Arts Fund and went towards supporting new arts activities and opportunities for disabled people. Works by Jake and Dinos Chapman, Mat Collishaw, Angela de la Cruz, Tacita Dean, Sir Antony Gormley, Marc Quinn and David Shrigley were auctioned at Bonhams London on 4 March 2014.

In 2016, an online auction at Paddle8 included donations of twenty-five artworks from a range of internationally acclaimed artists including Jeremy Deller, Julie Umerle, Candida Hofer, Ragnar Kjartansson, Hito Steyerl, Grayson Perry and Hans Op de Beeck in support of Shape Arts' 40th anniversary and the continued importance of the organisation's work.

== Adam Reynolds' Memorial Bursary ==
The Adam Reynolds Award, formerly the Adam Reynolds Memorial Bursary, was inaugurated in 2008 in memory of the sculptor Adam Reynolds(1959-2005). It is one of the most significant opportunities for disabled visual artists in the UK, offering an opportunity to engage in a three-month residency at a high-profile gallery. Venues that have hosted the residencies include the V & A, Camden Arts Centre, Spike Island, The Baltic, the Bluecoat Gallery and New Art Gallery Walsall.

== See also ==
- Social Model of Disability
- AccessArt
- NDACA
- Disability Arts
- Disability art
