= Holubia =

Holubia is the scientific name of two genera of organisms and may refer to:

- Holubia (beetle), a genus of insects in the family Buprestidae
- Holubia (plant), a genus of plants in the family Pedaliaceae
