= Pterodiscus =

Pterodiscus may refer to:

- Pterodiscus (plant), a genus of plants in the family Pedaliaceae
- Pterodiscus, a genus of fishes in the family Gasteropelecidae, synonym of Gasteropelecus
- Pterodiscus, a genus of gastropods in the family Amastridae, synonym of Tropidoptera
