= Holice =

- Town
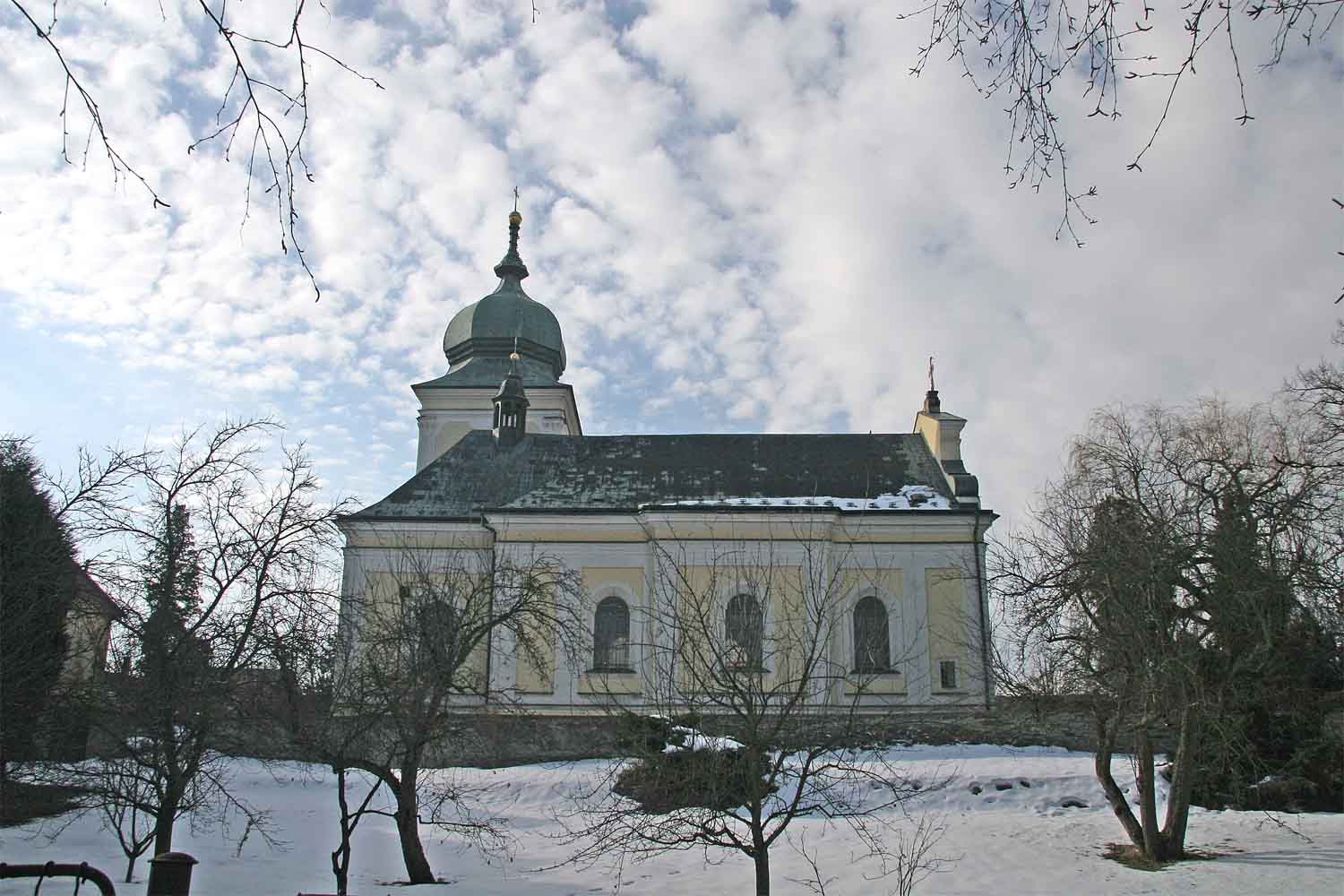
- Church of Saint Martin

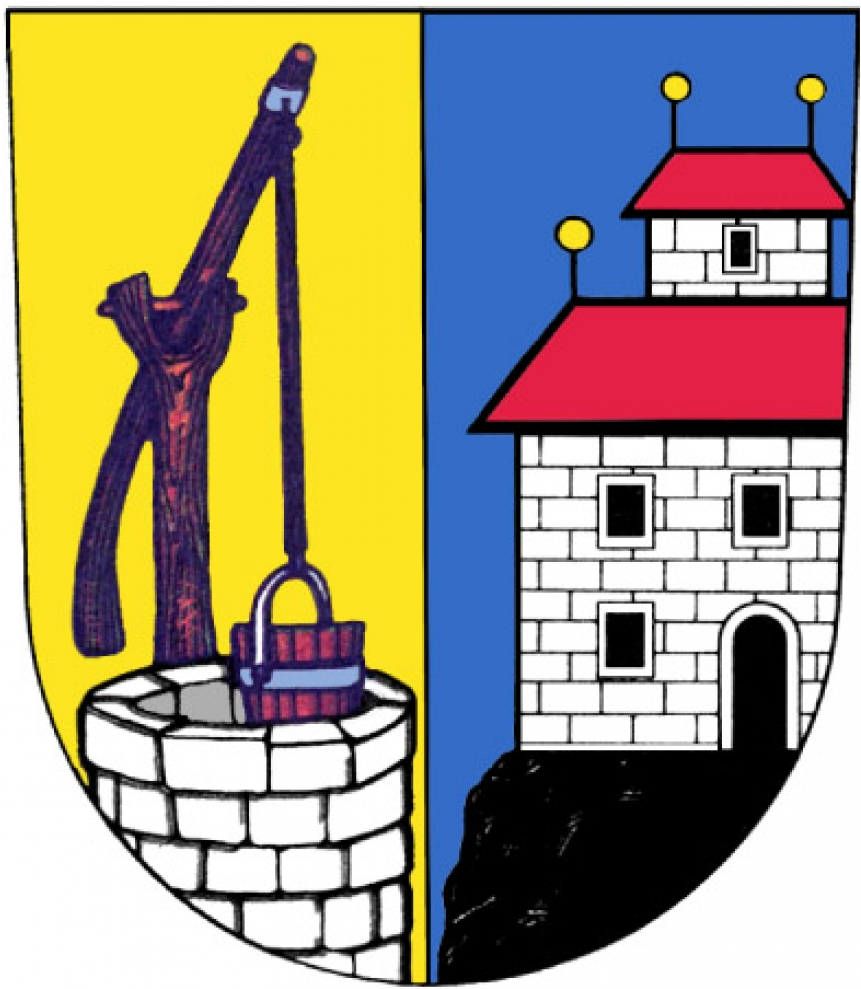
- Flag Coat of arms

- Location in the Czech Republic
- Coordinates: 50°3′58″N 15°59′9″E
- Country: Czech Republic
- Region: Pardubice
- District: Pardubice
- First mentioned: 1336

Government
  - Mayor: Ondřej Výborný

Area
  - Total: 19.65 km^{2} (7.59 sq mi)
- Elevation: 244 m (801 ft)

Population (2026-01-01)
  - Total: 6,783
  - Density: 345.2/km^{2} (894.0/sq mi)
- Time zone: UTC+1 (CET)
  - Summer (DST): UTC+2 (CEST)
- Postal code: 534 14
- Website: www.holice.eu

Holice (Czech pronunciation: [ˈɦolɪtsɛ]; German: Holitz) is a town in Pardubice District in the Pardubice Region of the Czech Republic. It has about 6,800 inhabitants. The town is located on the stream Ředický potok in the East Elbe Table. It is known as the birthplace of the explorer of Africa Emil Holub and there is a museum dedicated to him.

== Administrative division ==
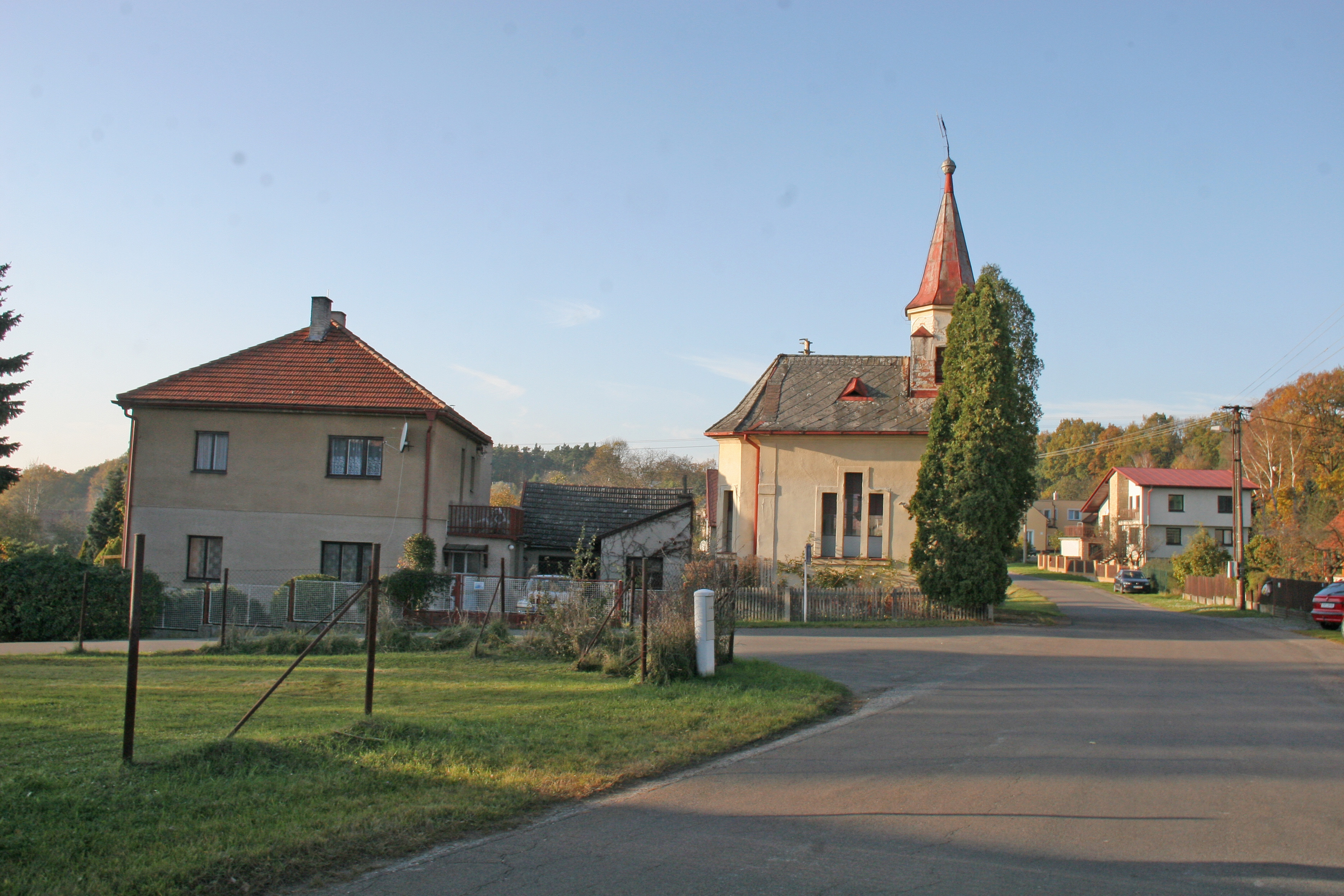
The village of Koudelka

Holice consists of seven municipal parts (in brackets population according to the 2021 census):

- Holice (4,766)
- Kamenec (55)
- Koudelka (253)
- Podhráz (128)
- Podlesí (255)
- Roveňsko (95)
- Staré Holice (1,193)

== Etymology ==
The name is derived from the personal name Hóla or Holý, meaning "the village of Hóla's/Holý's people".

== Geography ==
Holice is located about 14 kilometres (9 mi) east of Pardubice. It lies in a flat landscape in the East Elbe Table. The highest point is the hill Kamenec at 328 m (1,076 ft) above sea level. The stream Ředický potok flows through the town.

== History ==
The first written mention of Holice is from 1336, when it was property of John of Bohemia as a part of the Chvojno estate. The settlement was probably founded at the end of the 13th century. From the mid-14th century until the Hussite Wars, the village belonged to the Sternberg family. In the second half of the 15th century, Holice became a market town with a fortress and a church and became the centre of the estate. In 1481, Neptalim of Frimburk acquired Holice. During his rule, Holice prospered and acquired various privileges, including exemption from paying taxes, exemption from corvée and the right to brew beer.

In 1507, Vilém II of Pernštejn became the owner of the town. From that time until the establishment of a sovereign municipality in 1849, Holice was part of the Pardubice estate. In 1641, during the Thirty Years' War, Holice acquired the right to build a salt warehouse on its territory, but two years later the town was burned down by the Swedish army. Holice was also hit by other fire disasters in 1679 and 1680. The town then prospered until 1758, when it was ravaged by the army of Prussian King Frederick the Great during the Seven Years' War. But after the war, the market town recovered and prospered again.

At the end of the 19th century, the railway was built. At the beginning of the 20th century, the very first bus line, which ran from Pardubice to Holice, was launched. In 1931, Holice was promoted to a town.

== Demographics ==
Historical population

Year	Pop.	±%
1869	4,277	—
1880	5,060	+18.3%
1890	5,208	+2.9%
1900	5,335	+2.4%
1910	5,988	+12.2%

Year	Pop.	±%
1921	6,129	+2.4%
1930	6,585	+7.4%
1950	5,895	−10.5%
1961	6,217	+5.5%
1970	6,208	−0.1%

Year	Pop.	±%
1980	6,545	+5.4%
1991	6,429	−1.8%
2001	6,219	−3.3%
2011	6,581	+5.8%
2021	6,745	+2.5%

Source: Censuses

== Transport ==
Holice lies at the crossroad of two main road: the I/35 (the section from Olomouc to Hradec Králové) and the I/36 (connecting Pardubice with Rychnov nad Kněžnou District).

Holice is the terminus and start of a short railway line from/to Moravany.

== Sport ==
Near the village of Kamenec is a motocross track which bears the name of Michael Špaček.

== Sights ==
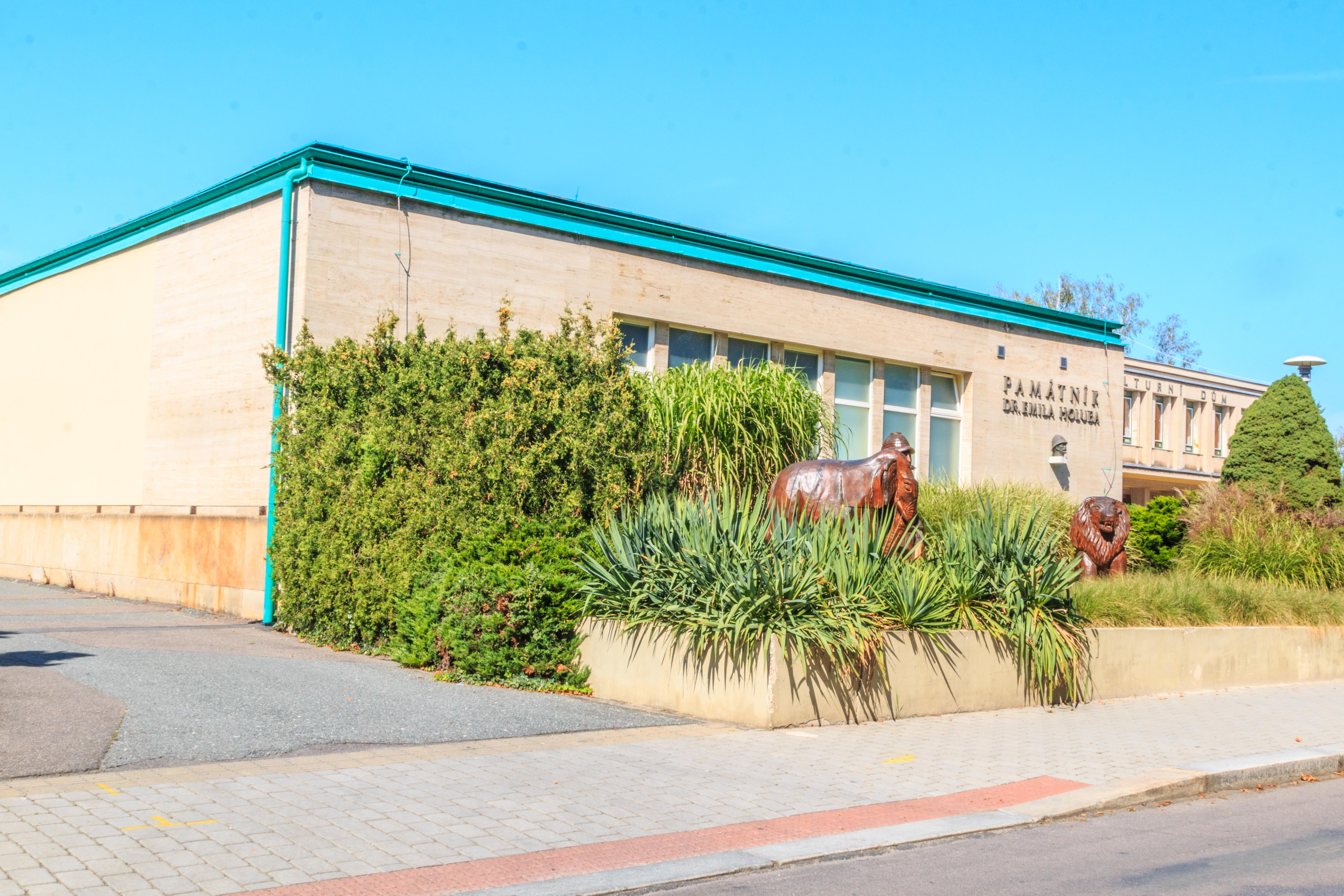
African Museum of Dr. Emil Holub

The main landmark of Holice is the Church of Saint Martin. It is a late Baroque church, built in 1736–1739.

The African Museum of Dr. Emil Holub is a museum dedicated to Emil Holub, the most notable local native. It was originally a memorial hall opened in 1956 and later a memorial, which was renamed the museum in 2012.

== Notable people ==
- Emil Holub (1847–1902), explorer of Africa
- Harry Horner (1910–1994), art director and set designer
- Václav Lohniský (1920–1980), actor
- Jan Kačer (1936–2024), actor and director

== Twin towns – sister cities ==
Holice is twinned with:

- Medzev, Slovakia
- Strzelce Opolskie, Poland
