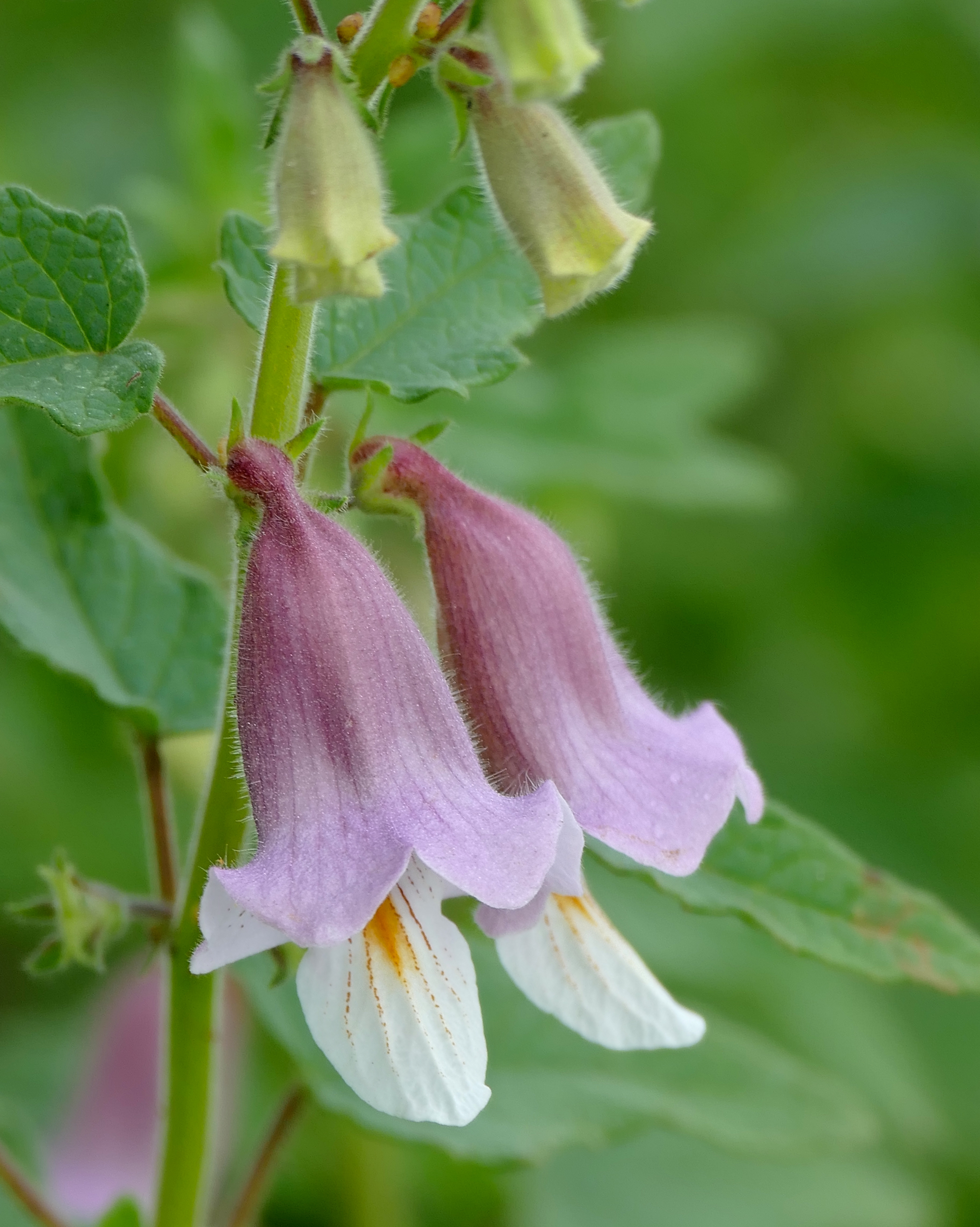

Scientific classification
- Kingdom: Plantae
- Clade: Tracheophytes
- Clade: Angiosperms
- Clade: Eudicots
- Clade: Asterids
- Order: Lamiales
- Family: Pedaliaceae
- Genus: Ceratotheca
- Species: C. sesamoides

Binomial name
- Ceratotheca sesamoides Endl.

= Ceratotheca sesamoides =

Species of flowering plant

Ceratotheca sesamoides is an annual flowering plant in the genus Ceratotheca. It is indigenous to Africa, and grows both as a wild and locally-cultivated species, and is colloquially referred to as false sesame owing to its marked similarities with common sesame (Sesamum indicum). The plant is most commonly cultivated in the African savannah and other semi-arid areas on the continent, and is found across Africa in both tropical and sub-tropical latitudes, usually growing in sandier soils south of the Sahara. It can be identified by numerous hairs on the stem; its pinkish flowers, often showing brown and purple markings; and a sub-erect growth habit. The leaves and flowers are often consumed as a vegetable or used in sauces. The leaves are thought to have medicinal properties, while the seeds can be used to produce cooking oil. Despite its many uses and increasing domestication at a local level, the plant remains predominantly underused and undervalued.

== Description and geography ==
Ceratotheca sesamoides typically grows to a height of around 60 cm, but has been known to reach upwards of 100 cm. It is a narrow, upright herb with pink, mauve or lilac flowers. The fruit produced by the plant is similar to that of Sesamum and is found in the form of a laterally-flattened capsule with slender horns at the distal end. These horns distinguish it from Sesamum, which lacks such horns. False sesame is native to the northern parts of West Africa and has been disseminated by humans across the continent from Senegal to Tanzania and the Democratic Republic of the Congo and southwards to Botswana and Mozambique.

== Growth and ecology ==
Ceratotheca sesamoides typically produces ten or more stems from its basal foliage clump, which often lie prostrate, and the frequent removal of younger shoots allows for protracted vegetative growth and flowering, which extends the productive period. C. sesamoides is a primarily self-pollinating plant, with the flowers opening at dawn. When the pollination process is completed, it takes about six weeks from anthesis to full fruit maturity. The seed germinates at the onset of the rainy season. Like other members of the Pedaliaceae, C. sesamoides is covered in mucilage glands, which can enable the species to survive dehydration without tissue death, making it somewhat drought resistant. False sesame is very flexible with regard to environment and growing conditions, occurring as a weed and in cultivated fields, growing best in well-drained sandy soils with high exposure to the sun, and with less success in rocky areas.

== Agriculture ==
Ceratotheca sesamoides is relatively easy to cultivate. Its rugged nature means that it requires little upkeep and maintenance, apart from some minimal weeding. Its environmental flexibility allows for intercropping with a range of other plants such as eggplant, cowpea, amaranth, sorghum, sweet potato and sesame. False sesame is relatively pest-resistant, often having to contend with mostly minor pests. In Burkina Faso, it is recorded as one of the most disease- and pest-tolerant vegetables.

== Practical uses ==
Ceratotheca sesamoides is a plant with many uses and applications. When cooked directly in soups the mucilage-containing leaves help to minimize nutrient loss into the water. Leaves are finely chopped and can be used in a variety of different sauces, a common example being a mixture of chopped leaves, groundnut flour, salt, onions, tomatoes and a small amount of hot water often eaten with porridge. The seeds can be ground up into a fine paste and mixed with staple foods such as beans and cassava. Seeds can also be crushed to extract oil similar to sesame oil that can be used in salads or in cooking. Adding the sap of false sesame leaves to the boiling seed pulp of Vitellaria paradoxa during the making of shea butter assists in the separation of fat. The leaves can also be used as livestock feed. It is claimed that false sesame also has a range of medical benefits, and is used by local peoples to treat a range of diseases common on the African continent. Aqueous leaf extracts are used in the treatment of diarrhea, due to the alkaloids, phenolics, flavonoids and saponins found in the extract. Warm leaves can be ground up and mixed with ash, then applied to inflamed cervical lymph nodes to help expedite the birthing process in both humans and animals. If the leaves are ground up with the rhizome of Anchomanes difformis the resulting mixture has been used to treat cases of leprosy.
