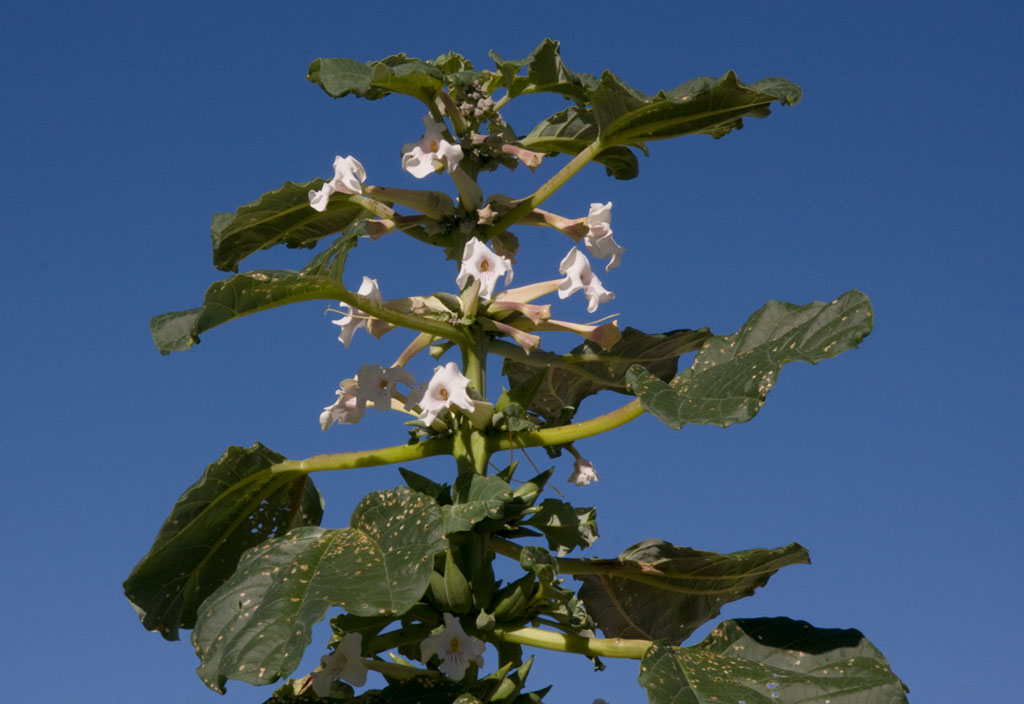
- Rogeria longiflora

Scientific classification
- Kingdom: Plantae
- Clade: Tracheophytes
- Clade: Angiosperms
- Clade: Eudicots
- Clade: Asterids
- Order: Lamiales
- Family: Pedaliaceae
- Genus: Rogeria; J.Gay ex Delile

Synonyms
- Basonca Raf.

= Rogeria (plant) =

Genus of flowering plants

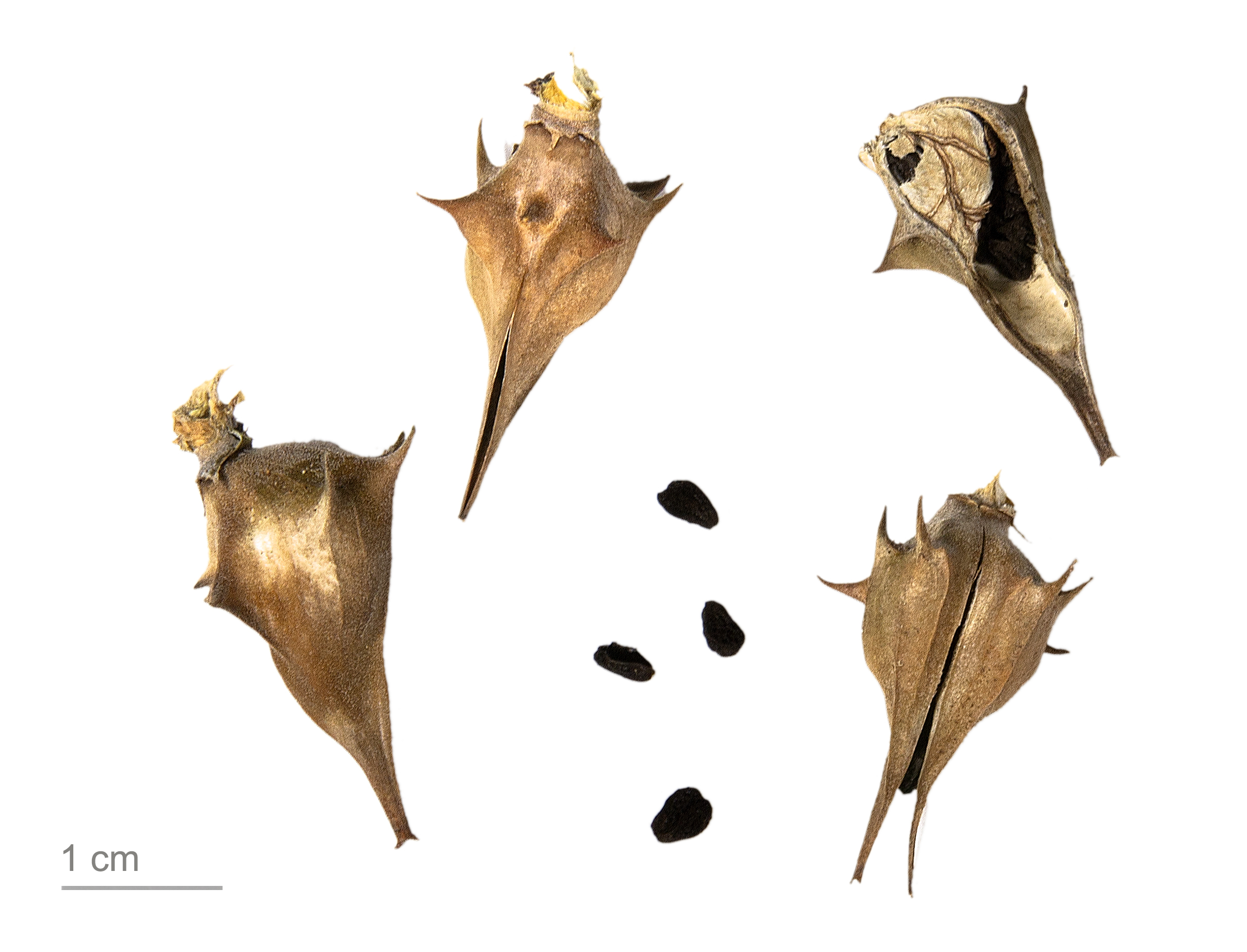
Rogeria adenophylla MHNT

Rogeria is a genus of plants in the Pedaliaceae family consisting of several species, with a native range extending from the island of Cape Verde to Eritrea, Namibia to the Cape Provinces (of South Africa).

It is found in the countries of Angola, Burkina Faso, Cameroon, Cape Verde, Chad, Eritrea, Mali, Mauritania, Namibia, Niger, Nigeria, Senegal, Sudan and South Africa. It was also thought to be found in Brazil as well as Africa, but this seems to be a mix-up with another shrub species.

Some species such as Rogeria longiflora are medicinal plants.

== General description ==
Rogeria species bear long, tubular flowers but with very woody armoured capsules and flattened seeds.

It is a varied genus, it does not have solitary flowers (similar to Uncarina species) and with the common denominator that in the difference in the size of the carpels and the indehiscence (splitting of the seed capsule) of the adaxial carpel. Species Ceratotheca and Rogeria are known as 'Wind-ballists', this is due to when the fruits open at the top but stay on the plant, then as the stems produce strong movements, the seeds are then gradually expelled from the capsule.

The calyx has five sepals (petals), the corolla is tubular and funnel-shaped. The stamens are four in number, and do not project beyond the border of the corolla. The fruit (or seed capsule) is almost nut-like, opens towards the point. It has 4 - 8 spines, and appears to be 4-6 celled. The cells having either an indefinite number or only solitary seeds.

== Taxonomy ==
The generic name of Rogeria is derived from Mr. Roger, a French plant collector, who collected in Senegal. Lotte Burkhardt's book 'Index of Eponymic Plant Names' in 2018 notes that Jacques-François Roger (1787–1849) was a French lawyer, colonial administrator and plant collector.

Rogeria (Pedaliaceae) was initially named by Swiss/French botanist Jaques Étienne Gay in 1824 in Ann. Sci. Nat. (Paris) Vol.1 on page 457, this was later regarded as invalid by Biodiversity Heritage Library and IPNI. As the name was not validly published in 1824 and also because no genus description was provided and the genus was found later not to be monotypic.

Rogeria J.Gay ex Delile, Cent. Pl. Afr. Voy. Méroé 78, 106, t. 2, fig. 3; Atlas 2: t. 63, fig. 3 (1826). by French botanist Alire Raffeneau Delile is regarded as the true author citation. Such as Rogeria adenophylla is the type species and was published by J. Gay ex Delile in Cent. Pl. Afr. Voy. Méroé. ('Centurie de Plantes d'Afrique du Voyage à Méroé') Vol.78, table 2, figure 3. in 1826.

== Species known ==
According to Kew,

- Rogeria adenophylla J.Gay ex Delile
- Rogeria armeniaca Bedigian
- Rogeria bigibbosa Engl.
- Rogeria longiflora (D.Royen) J.Gay ex DC. ('desert foxglove')

Tropicos (lists, as of 9 August 2021); Rogeria adenophylla, Rogeria armeniaca, Rogeria bigibbosa, Rogeria microcarpa Klotzsch and Rogeria etrophila De Wint.

The genus is accepted by United States Department of Agriculture and the Agricultural Research Service, they accept 3 species, Rogeria adenophylla J. Gay ex Delile, Rogeria bigibbosa Engl. and Rogeria longiflora (L.) J. Gay ex DC.
