= Emil Holub =

Czech doctor, explorer and cartographer (1847–1902)

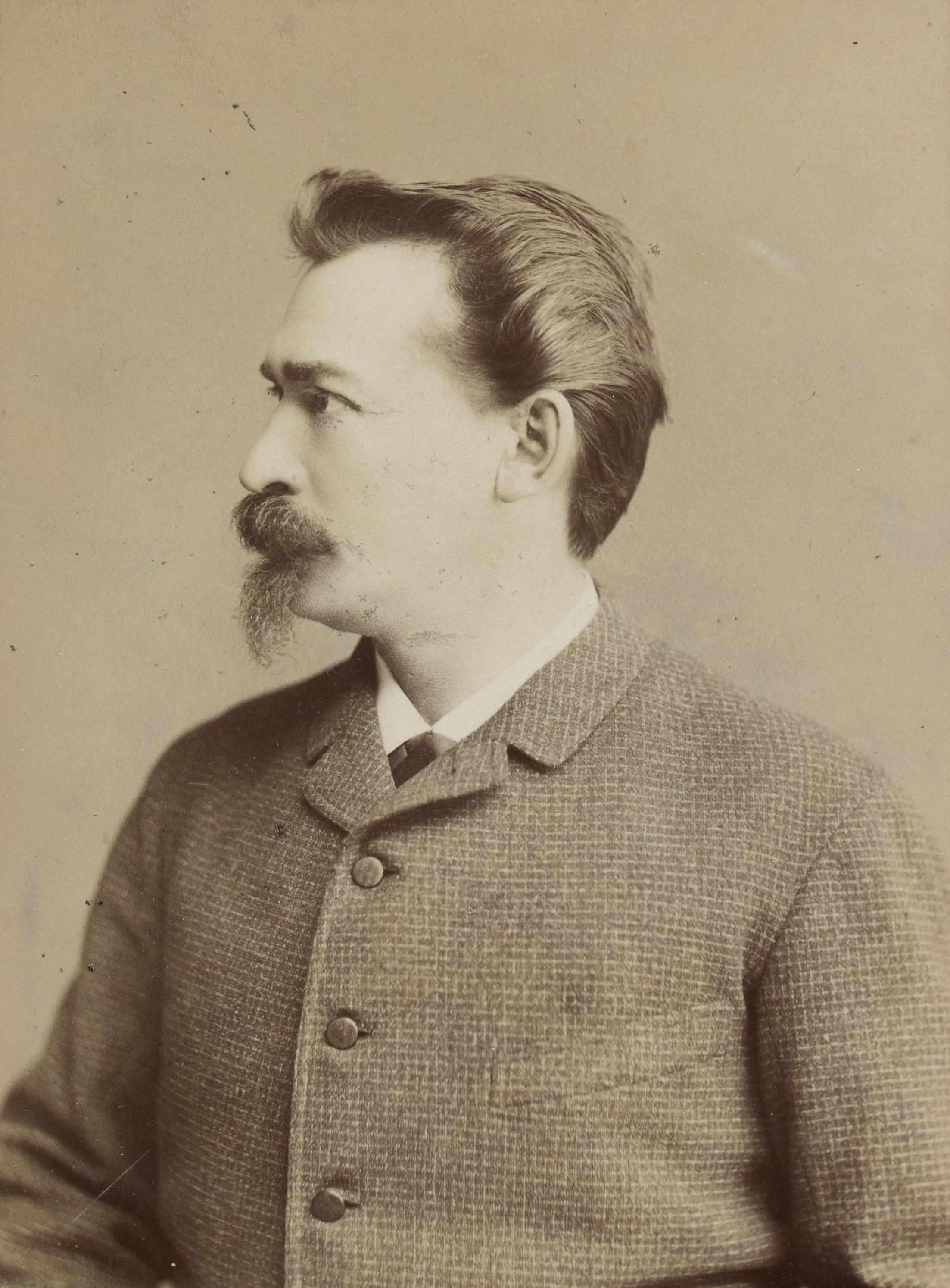
- Born: 7 October 1847; Holice, Bohemia, Austrian Empire
- Died: 21 February 1902 (aged 54); Vienna, Austria-Hungary
- Education: Prague University
- Scientific career
- Fields: Ethnography; exploration

Emil Holub (7 October 1847 – 21 February 1902) was a Czech medical doctor, explorer, cartographer and ethnographer in Africa.

== Early life ==
Holub was born on 7 October 1847, in Holice in eastern Bohemia he family of a municipal doctor. After studying at a German-language grammar school in Žatec (Saaz), he was admitted at Prague University where he obtained a degree as a doctor of medicine (1872).

== Expeditions in Africa ==
Inspired to visit Africa by the diaries of David Livingstone, Holub travelled to Cape Town, South Africa, shortly after graduation and eventually settled in Dutoitspan near Kimberley to practise medicine. After eight months, Holub set out in a convoy of local hunters on a two-month experimental expedition, or "scientific safari", where he began to assemble a large natural history collection.

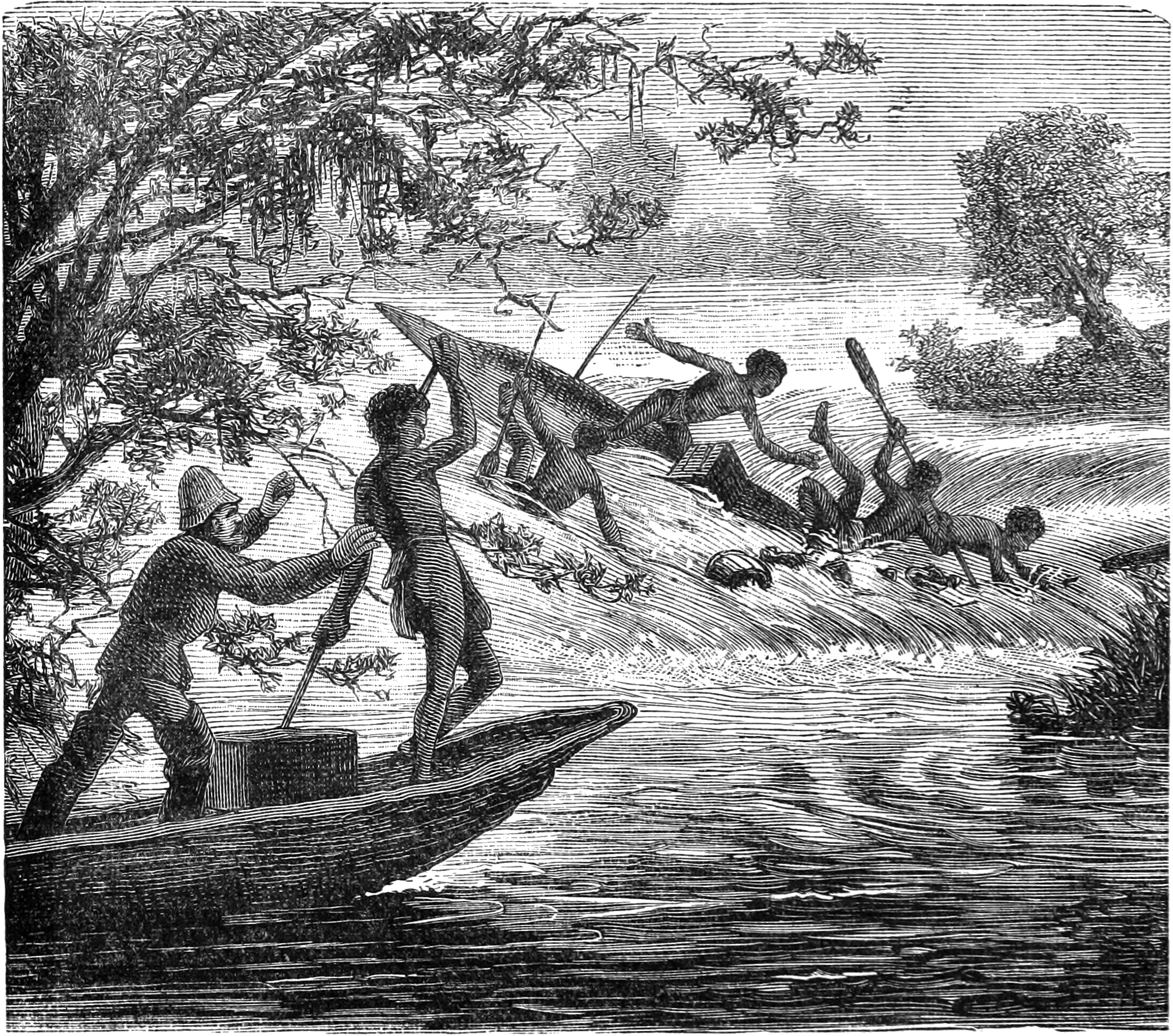
Shipwreck on Zambezi on the third expedition resulting in loss of much collected material, 1881

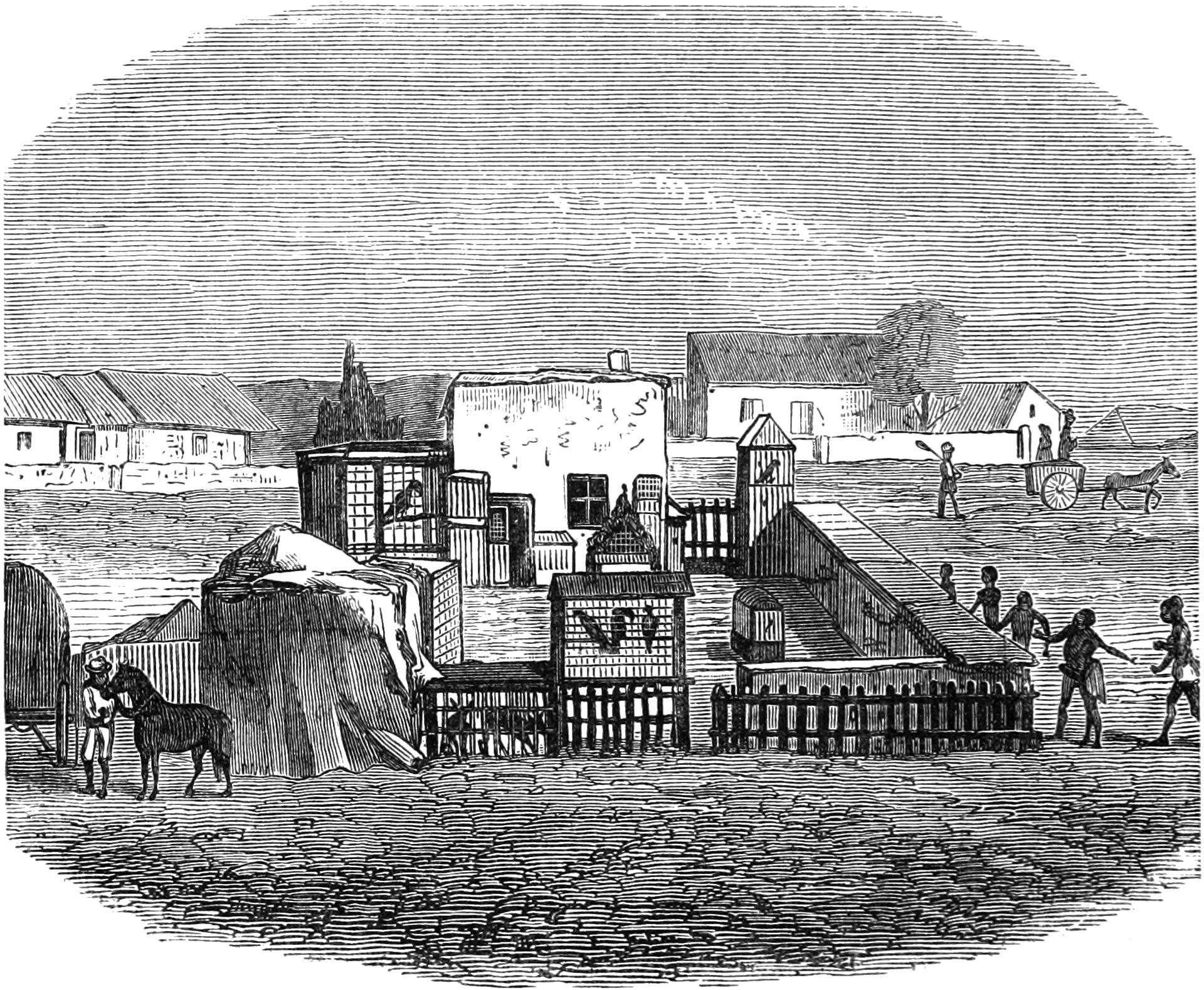
Emil Holub's house in Bultfontein in the 1870s

In 1873, Holub set out on his second scientific safari, devoting his attention to the collection of ethnographic material. On his third expedition in 1875, he ventured all the way to the Zambezi river and made the first detailed map of the region surrounding Victoria Falls. Holub also wrote and published the first book account of the Victoria Falls, published in English in Grahamstown in 1879.

After returning to Prague for several years, Holub made plans for a bold African expedition. In 1883, Holub, along with his new wife Rosa (1865–1958) and six European guides, set out to do what no one had done before: explore the entire length of Africa from Cape Town all the way to Egypt. However, the expedition was troubled by illness, poisoning of draugh oxen by the plant Dichapetalum cymosum and, eventually, the uncooperative or even rebelling Ila tribesmen and Holub's team was forced to turn back in 1886.

Holub mounted two exhibitions, highly attended but ending up in financial loss, in 1891 in Vienna and in 1892 in Prague. Frustrated that he was unable to find a permanent home for his large collection of artefacts, he gradually sold or gave away parts of it to museums, scientific institutions and schools.

Later Holub published a series of documents, contributing to papers and magazines, and delivering lectures. His early death came in Vienna on 21 February 1902, from lingering complications of malaria and other diseases he had acquired while in Africa.

== Commemorations of Holub's legacy ==
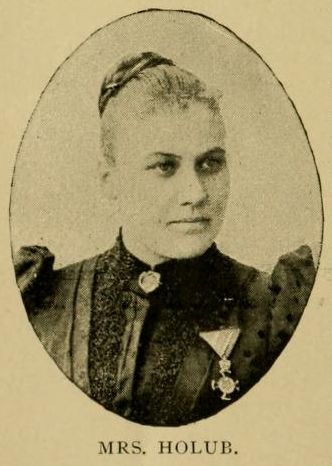
Rosa Holub

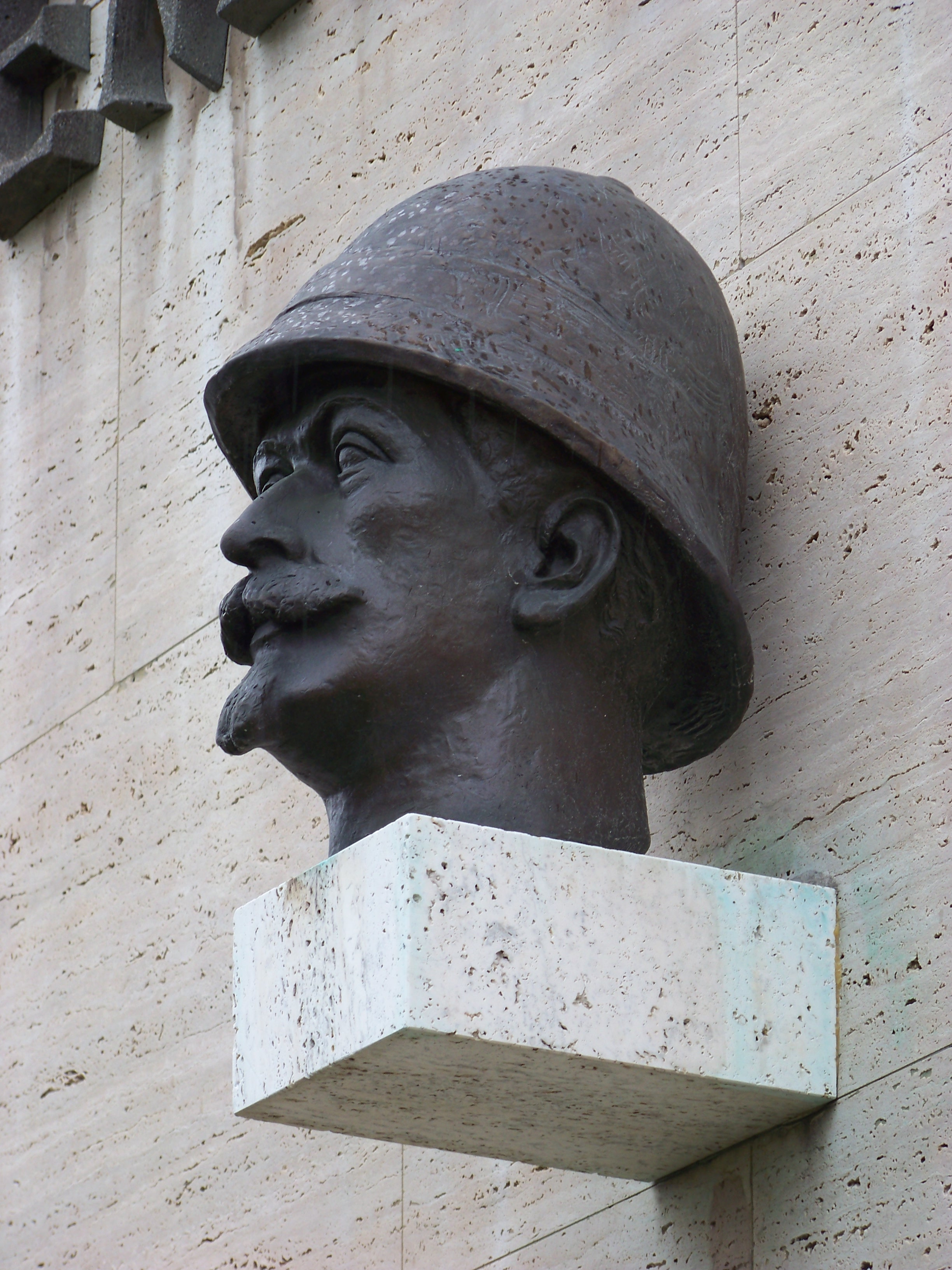
Bust of Holub at his namesake museum in Holice, Czech Republic

- In 1884, Daniel Oliver published and described in Hooker's book Icones Plantarum (Hooker's Icon. Pl.) Vol.15 in table 1475, the plant Holubia saccata, a monotypic genus of flowering plants belonging to the family Pedaliaceae. It was named in Holub's honour.
- In 1949, a monument to Holub by Jindřich Soukup was unveiled in his hometown of Holice.
- In 1952, Czech movie Velké dobrodružství (Great Adventure) was filmed about Holub's expeditions.
- In 1970, the town of Holice opened a museum dedicated to Emil Holub near the main post office with an associated monument nearby. Since 1999 the gymnasium in the town bears explorer's name.
- On 20 February 2002, the Czech National Bank issued a CZK 200 silver coin commemorating the 100th anniversary of Dr. Emil Holub's death
- Between 2002 and 2006, the Embassy of the Czech Republic in Harare organized several events to commemorate Emil Holub.
- In a 2005 poll, he was voted #90 of the 100 greatest Czechs.
- In September 2005, exactly 130 years since Holub's first visit to the Victoria Falls, a bust of Holub by the Zimbabwean sculptor Last Mahwahwa was unveiled by the Ambassador of the Czech Republic, Jaroslav Olša, Jr., and the Ambassador of the Republic of Austria, Michael Brunner, in front of the National Museum of Zambia in Livingstone, the city adjacent to the Victoria Falls.

== Works ==
- Holub, Emil (1881). Seven Years in South Africa: Travels, Researches and Hunting Adventures, Between the Diamond-Fields and the Zambesi (1872–79). Vol. 2 vol. London: Sampson Low, Marston, Searle & Rivington. (Reprinted (1975), Johannesburg: Africana Book Society.)

== Sources ==
- Novák, J. (November 1987). "140 years since the birth of Emil Holub". Časopis českých lékařů. 126 (46): 1447–8. PMID 3319177.
- Kops, J. (November 1975). "From the history of medicine. Conqueror of the black continent (Emil Holub)". Zdravotnická pracovnice. 25 (11): 678–9. PMID 769399.
- Slavĕtínský, M. (June 1972). "Anniversary of a physician-traveler Emil Holub M.D. (Oct. 7, 1847-Feb. 21, 1902)". Vnitřní lékařství. 18 (6): 601. PMID 4557960.
