= Pedaliodiscus =

Scientific classification
- Kingdom: Plantae
- Clade: Tracheophytes
- Clade: Angiosperms
- Clade: Eudicots
- Clade: Asterids
- Order: Lamiales
- Family: Pedaliaceae
- Genus: Pedaliodiscus; Ihlenf.
- Species: P. macrocarpus

Binomial name
- Pedaliodiscus macrocarpus Ihlenf.

Genus of plants

Pedaliodiscus is a monotypic genus of flowering plants belonging to the family Pedaliaceae. The only species is Pedaliodiscus macrocarpus.

Its native range is Eastern Tropical Africa.
