= Linariopsis =

Scientific classification
- Kingdom: Plantae
- Clade: Tracheophytes
- Clade: Angiosperms
- Clade: Eudicots
- Clade: Asterids
- Order: Lamiales
- Family: Pedaliaceae
- Genus: Linariopsis; Welw.

Genus of plants

Linariopsis is a genus of flowering plants belonging to the family Pedaliaceae.

Its native range is Western Tropical Africa to Angola.

Species:

- Linariopsis chevalieri Jacq.-Fél.
- Linariopsis prostrata Welw.
