= Dewinteria =

Scientific classification
- Kingdom: Plantae
- Clade: Tracheophytes
- Clade: Angiosperms
- Clade: Eudicots
- Clade: Asterids
- Order: Lamiales
- Family: Pedaliaceae
- Genus: Dewinteria van Jaarsv. & A.E.van Wyk
- Species: D. petrophila

Binomial name
- Dewinteria petrophila (De Winter) van Jaarsv. & A.E.van Wyk

Monotypic genus of plants

Dewinteria is a monotypic genus of flowering plants belonging to the family Pedaliaceae. The only species is Dewinteria petrophila.

Its native range is Namibia.

Dewinteria petrophila was first collected by Dr Bernard de Winter and Dr Otto Leistner, (botanist and editor at the Botanical Research Institute), in an expedition to the Kaokoveld in 1957 (Gunn & Codd 1981).

The new genus name Dewinteria was named in honour of Dr Bernard de Winter, retired Director of the former Botanical Research Institute in Pretoria.
