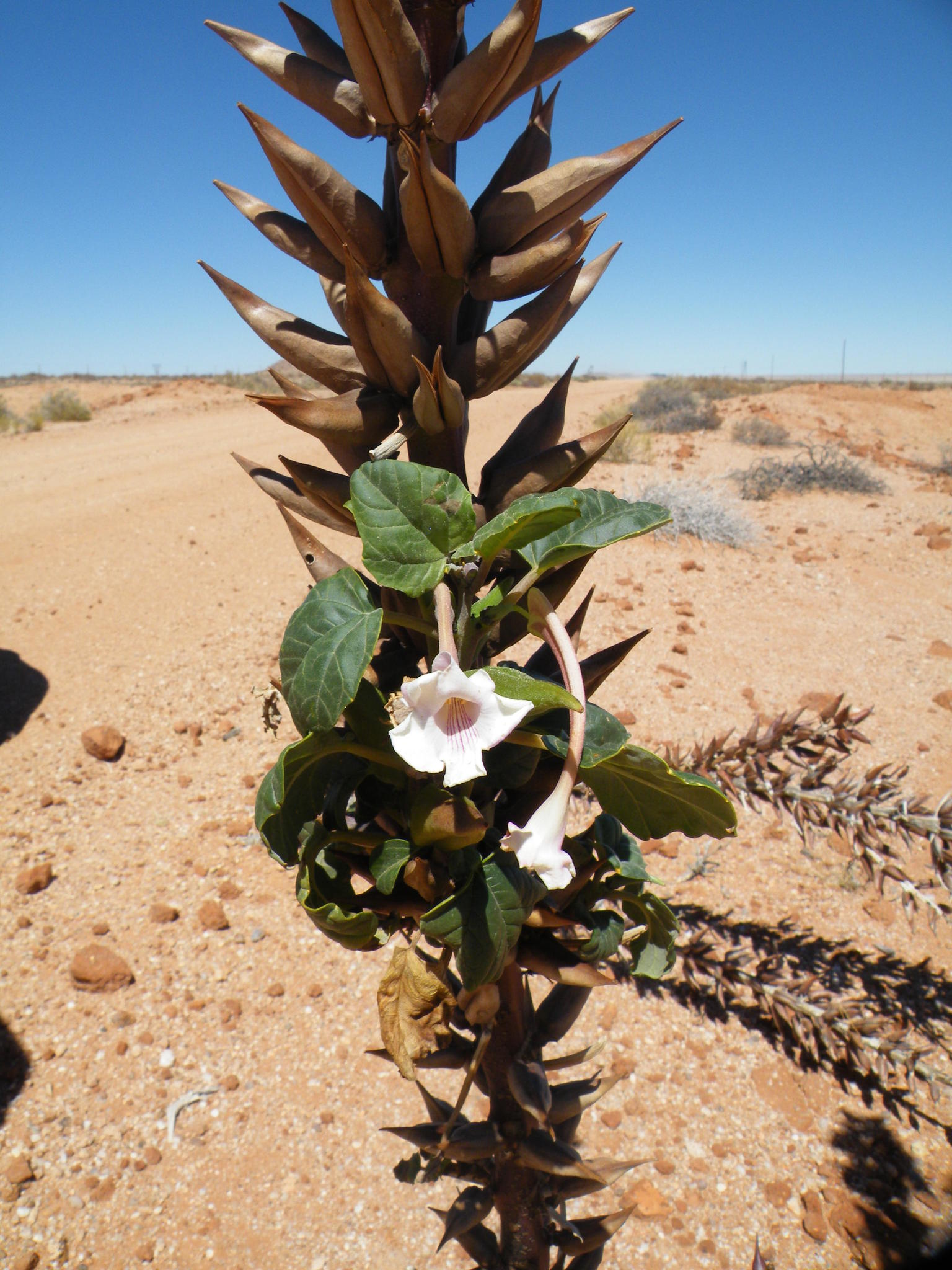

Conservation status
- Least Concern (SANBI Red List)

Scientific classification
- Kingdom: Plantae
- Clade: Tracheophytes
- Clade: Angiosperms
- Clade: Eudicots
- Clade: Asterids
- Order: Lamiales
- Family: Pedaliaceae
- Genus: Rogeria
- Species: R. longiflora

Binomial name
- Rogeria longiflora (Royen) J.Gay ex DC.

Synonyms
- Martynia capensis Gloxin; Basonca longiflora (D.Royen) Raf.; Pedalium longiflorum (D.Royen) Decne.; Rogeria rangeana Dinter

= Rogeria longiflora =

Species of flowering plant

Rogeria longiflora, also known as the white djirrie, is a species of flowering plant in the genus Rogeria. It is native to Namibia and the northern Cape Provinces of South Africa.

== Distribution ==
Rogeria longiflora is found from Namibia to the Northern Cape.

== Conservation status ==
Rogeria longiflora is classified as Least Concern.
