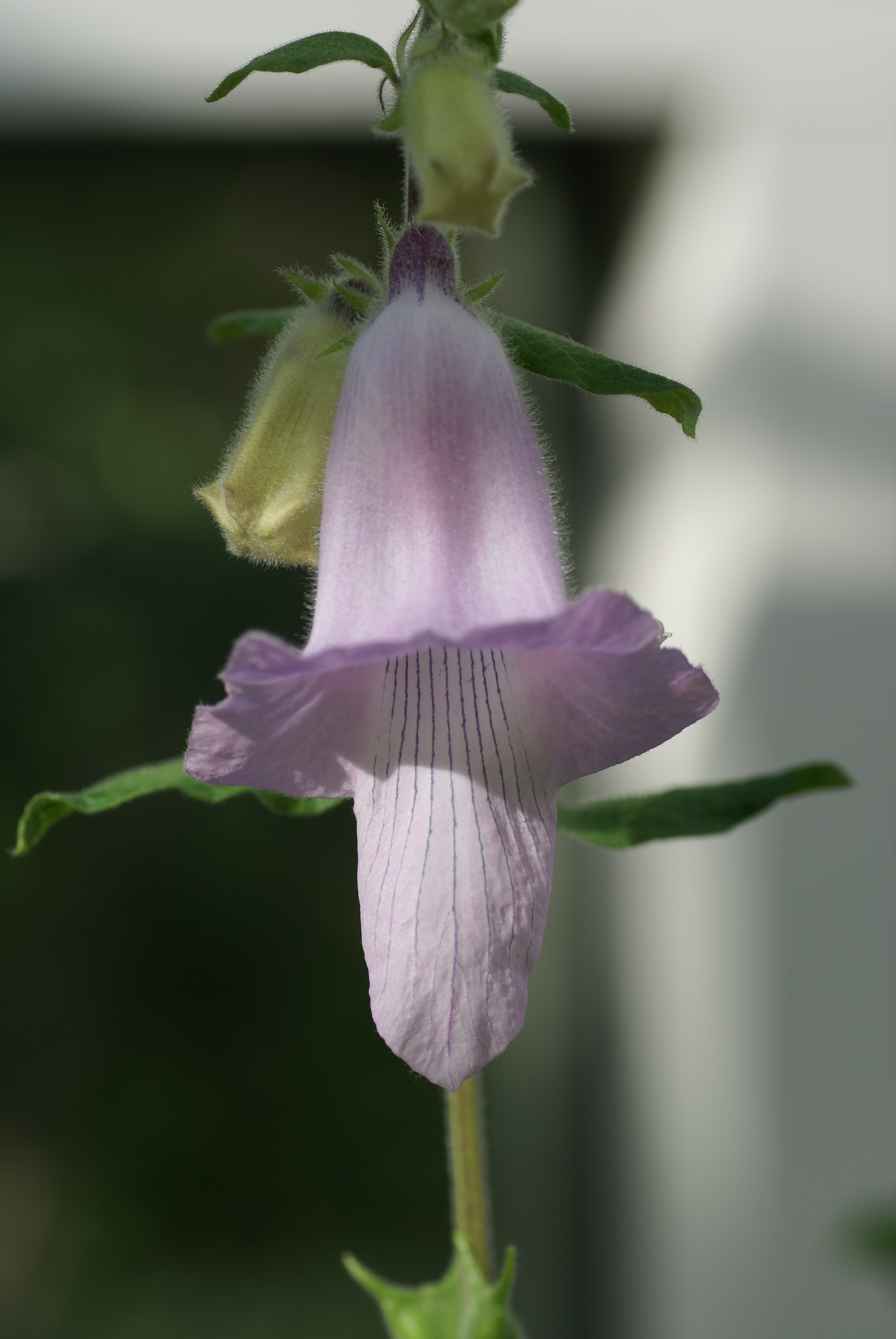
- Ceratotheca triloba

Scientific classification
- Kingdom: Plantae
- Clade: Tracheophytes
- Clade: Angiosperms
- Clade: Eudicots
- Clade: Asterids
- Order: Lamiales
- Family: Pedaliaceae
- Genus: Ceratotheca; Endl.

= Ceratotheca =

Genus of flowering plants

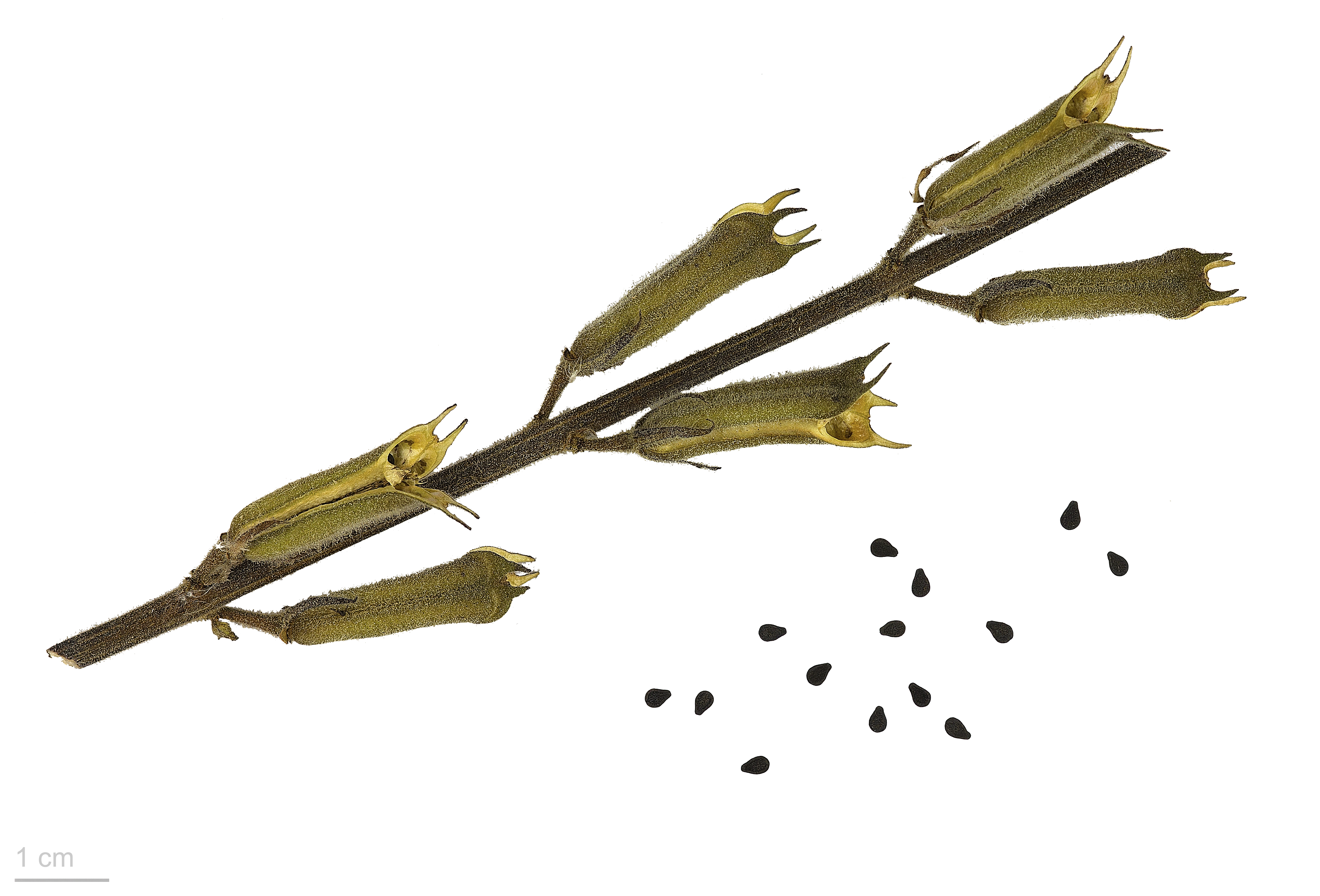
Ceratotheca triloba - MHNT

Ceratotheca is a genus of plants in the family Pedaliaceae (sesame family) comprising about five species native to worldwide tropical areas and to southern Africa.

The genus name is derived from the Greek words keras meaning horn and theke meaning capsule.

== Species ==
Species include:

- Ceratotheca integribracteata Engl.
- Ceratotheca reniformis Abels (Limpopo foxglove)
- Ceratotheca saxicola E.A.Bruce
- Ceratotheca sesamoides Endl. (false sesame)
- Ceratotheca triloba (Bernh.) Hook.f. (South African foxglove)
