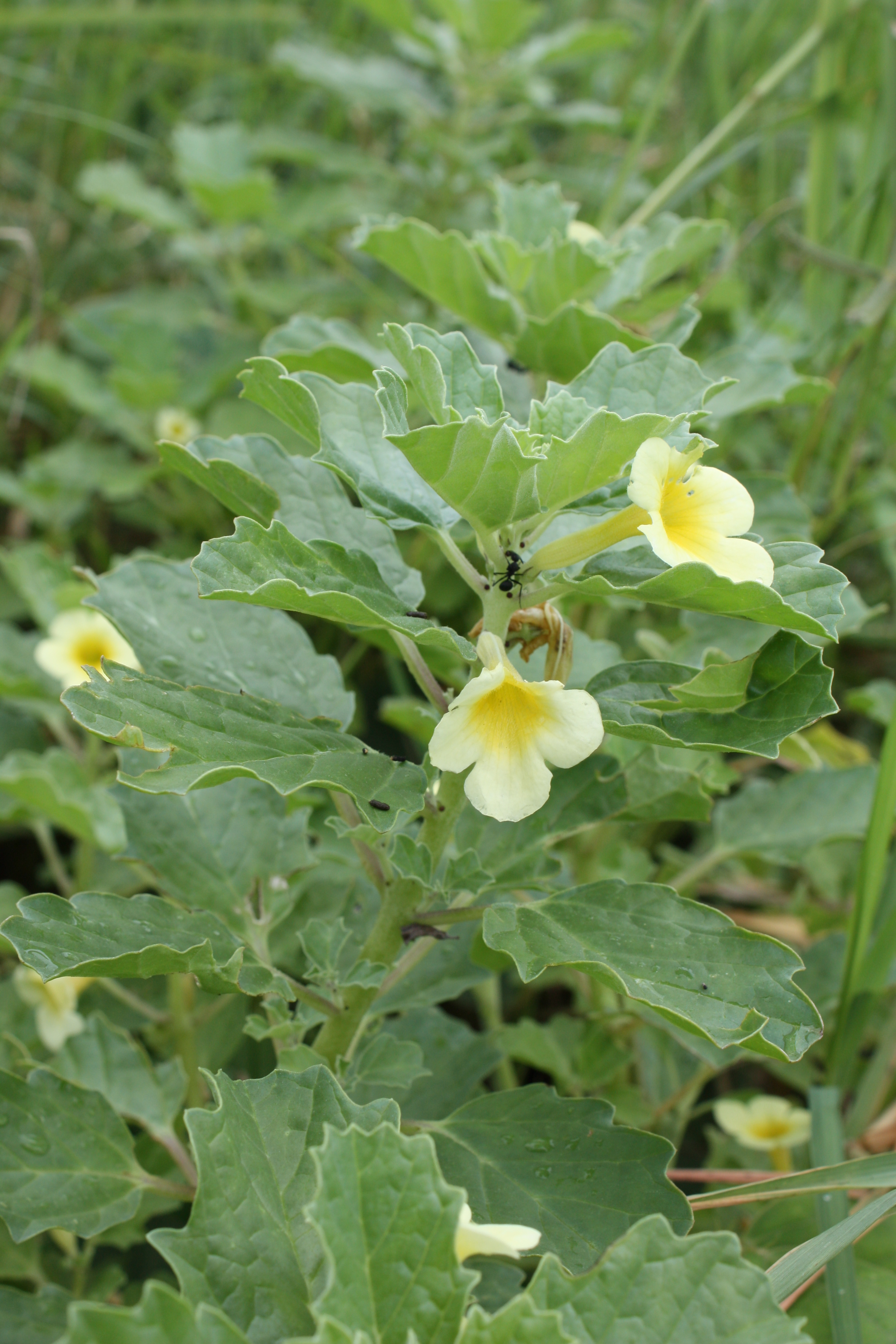
- Pedalium murex

Scientific classification
- Kingdom: Plantae
- Clade: Tracheophytes
- Clade: Angiosperms
- Clade: Eudicots
- Clade: Asterids
- Order: Lamiales
- Family: Pedaliaceae
- Genus: Pedalium; D.Royen
- Species: P. murex

Binomial name
- Pedalium murex L.

Synonyms
- Genus: Cacatali Adans.; Murex L. ex Kuntze; Species: Pedalium microcarpum (Klotzsch) Decne.; Murex burmanni Kuntze; Pedalium muricatum Salisb.; Rogeria microcarpa Klotzsch

= Pedalium =

Genus of flowering plants

Pedalium is a genus of plant in the Pedaliaceae family comprising one species, Pedalium murex. It is distributed in tropical Africa, the Indian subcontinent and Southeast Asia.

== Etymology ==
The genera name is derived from the Greek word pedalion meaning 'rudder of a ship'.
