= Holubia (beetle) =

Scientific classification
- Kingdom: Animalia
- Phylum: Arthropoda
- Class: Insecta
- Order: Coleoptera
- Suborder: Polyphaga
- Infraorder: Elateriformia
- Family: Buprestidae
- Subfamily: Agrilinae
- Genus: Holubia; Obenberger, 1924

Genus of beetles

Holubia is a genus of beetles in the family Buprestidae, containing the following species:

- Holubia gabonica Bellamy, 2008
- Holubia kheili Obenberger, 1924
