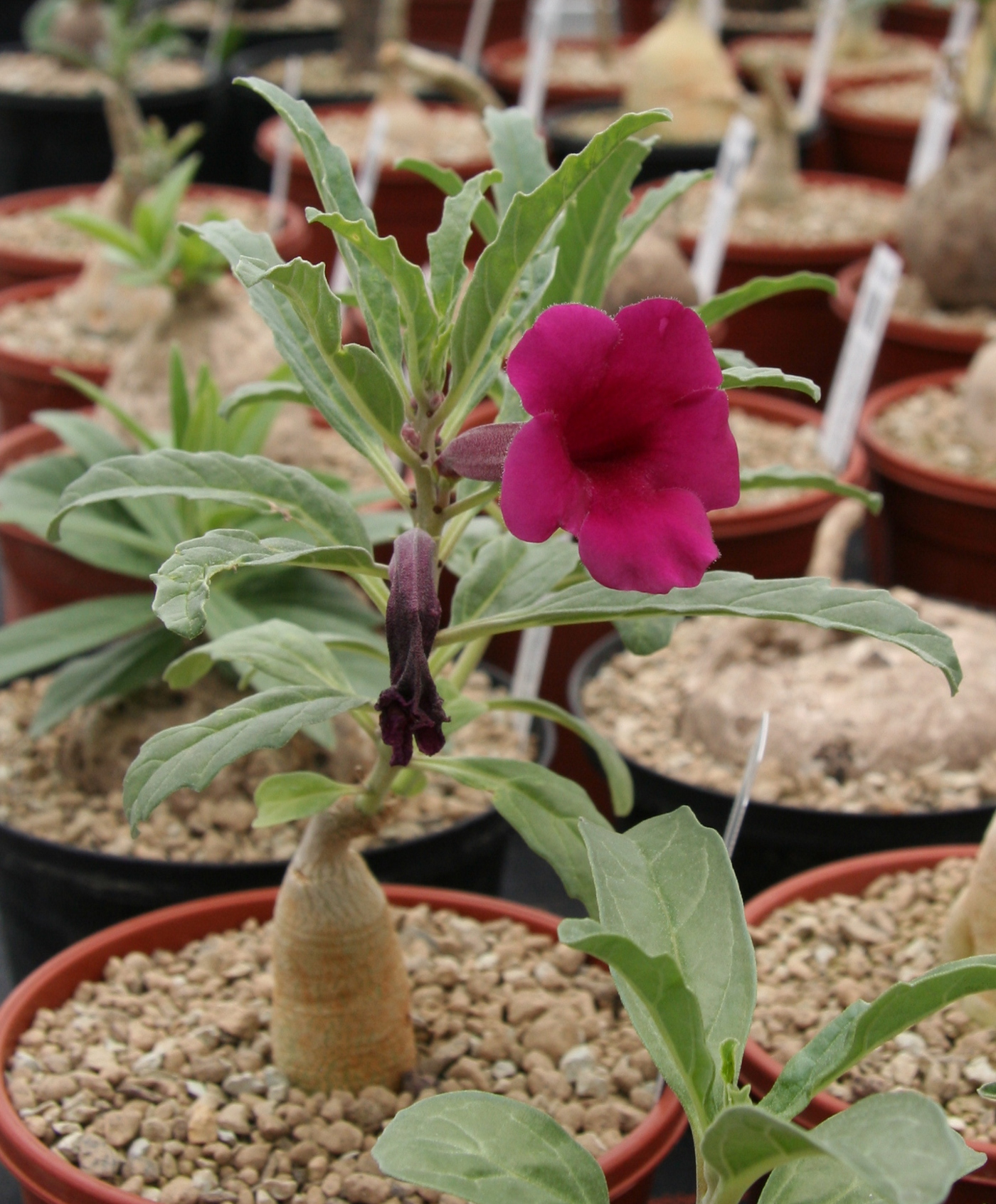
- Pterodiscus speciosus

Scientific classification
- Kingdom: Plantae
- Clade: Tracheophytes
- Clade: Angiosperms
- Clade: Eudicots
- Clade: Asterids
- Order: Lamiales
- Family: Pedaliaceae
- Genus: Pterodiscus; Hook.

Synonyms
- Pedaliophyton Engl.

= Pterodiscus (plant) =

Genus of flowering plants

Pterodiscus is a genus of plant in the Pedaliaceae family comprising several species with a native range from Ethiopia to S. Africa. The range passes through the countries of Angola, Botswana, Ethiopia, Kenya, Mozambique, Namibia, Somalia, Sudan, Tanzania, Zambia and Zimbabwe. Plus it is found also within the Provinces of South Africa in Cape Provinces, Free State, KwaZulu-Natal and Northern Provinces.

The genus was originally established by William Jackson Hooker from one species found in South Africa, Pterodiscus speciosus. The species was first published and described by William Jackson Hooker in Curtis's Bot. Mag. Vol.70 on table 4117 in 1844.

The genus is accepted by United States Department of Agriculture and the Agricultural Research Service but they do not list any species.

== General description ==
They are perennial herbs, that have a thick caudex (rootstock), that is either part of an underground tuber which is as wide as the above ground caudex, or the underground tuber can be wider and broader. Overall the plant does not reach more than 30 cm (12 in) high. From the caudex, an unbranched stem arises, normally every year. The leaves are sub-succulent and fleshy, and very variable in shape, ranging from linear to strap-shaped, undulate to broadly oblong. They are dentate (toothed), pinnatilobed, pinnatifid (meaning pinnately dissected to the central vein) or pinnatipartite. The solitary flowers arise from the leaf axils, which come in a range of colours, from yellow, (sometimes suffused with purple,) brilliant orange, red, wine-red, purple to dark purple. The calyx is small. The corolla is funnel-shaped or narrowly cylindrical, often slightly gibbous (rounded protuberance) at the base with a reduced spur. They have 4 stamens and a bilocular (or 2 compartmented) ovary). The fruit (or seed capsule) is indehiscent (does not split down the side), instead it has 4 broad longitudinal, prominent wings (which are parchment-like). The upper part of the capsule is beak-like. The seeds are variable in both shape and structure of the testa.

== Etymology ==
The genera name is derived from the Greek word ptero meaning 'winged' and the Latin word discus meaning 'disc'. This refers to the fruit structure, a flattened fruit that bears wings.

== Species ==
There were 18 named species in tropical and South Africa, but most of these were found to be synonyms of other species.

Known species include (according to Kew, and Tropicos):

- Pterodiscus angustifolius Engl.
- Pterodiscus aurantiacus Welw.
- Pterodiscus brasiliensis (J.Gay ex DC.) Asch.
- Pterodiscus coeruleus Chiov.
- Pterodiscus kellerianus Schinz.
- Pterodiscus ruspolii Engl.
- Pterodiscus speciosus Hook.

Pterodiscus saccatus S.Moore and Pterodiscus undulatus Baker are listed by Hans-Dieter Ihlenfeldt, and Pterodiscus ngamicus N.E.Br. ex Stapf by Flora of Botswana. Also P. somaliensis Baker ex Stapf, P. wellbyi Stapf, P. heterophyllus Stapf, and P. purpureus Chiov. are listed as synonyms in 2001.

While Encyclopedia of Life, lists 14 species including; Pterodiscus angustifolius Engl., Pterodiscus aurantiacus Welw., Pterodiscus cinnabarinus Peckover, Pterodiscus coeruleus Chiov., Pterodiscus elliottii Baker ex Stapf, Pterodiscus gayi Decne., Pterodiscus kellerianus Schinz, Pterodiscus luridus Hook. fil., Pterodiscus makatiniensis Peckover, Pterodiscus ngamicus N. E. Brown ex Stapf, Pterodiscus ruspolii Engl., Pterodiscus saccatus S. Moore, Pterodiscus speciosus Hook. and Pterodiscus undulatus Baker fil.

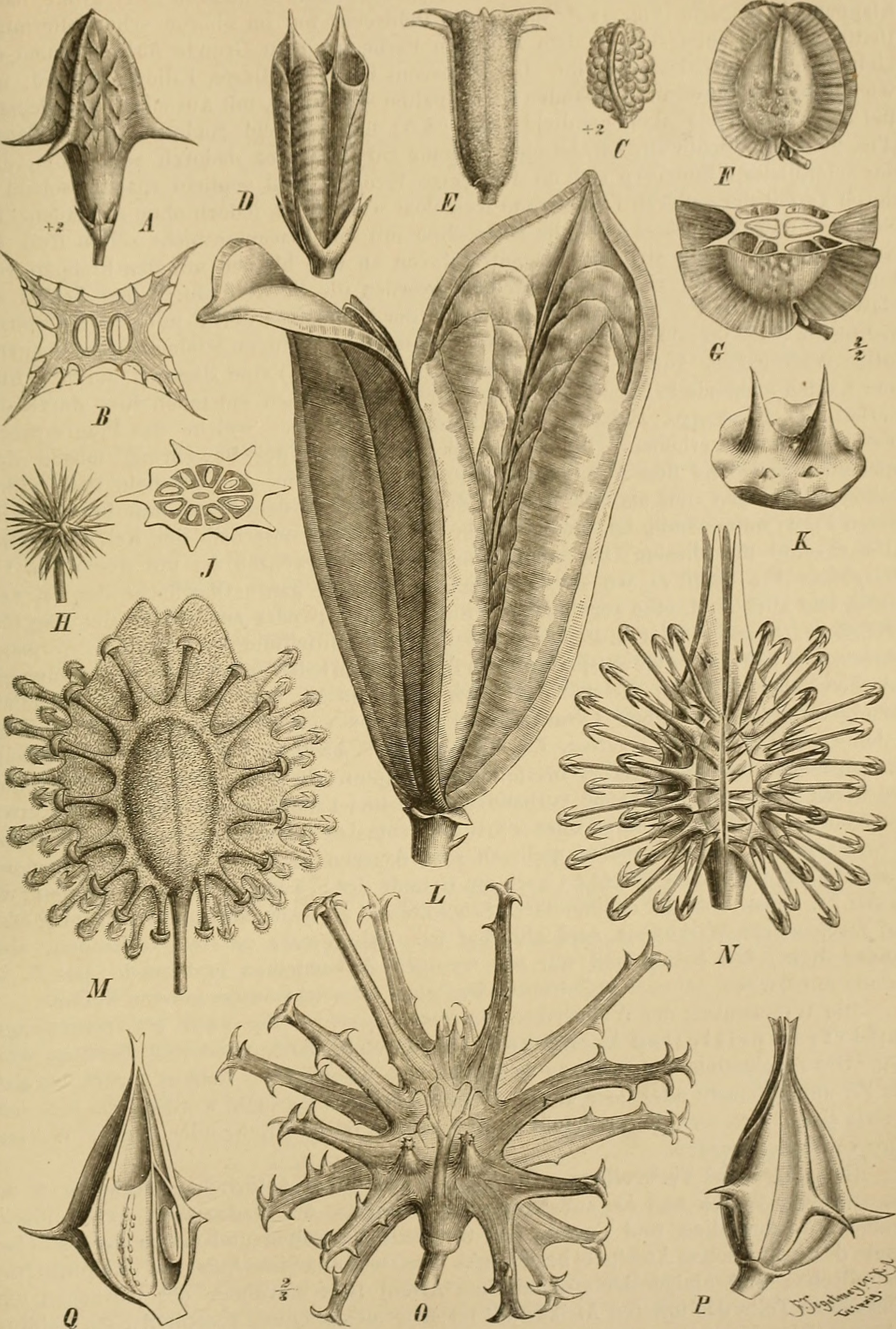
Illustration from Die Natürlichen Pflanzenfamilien showing Pterodiscus at letter F
