= Vysoké Chvojno =

- Municipality
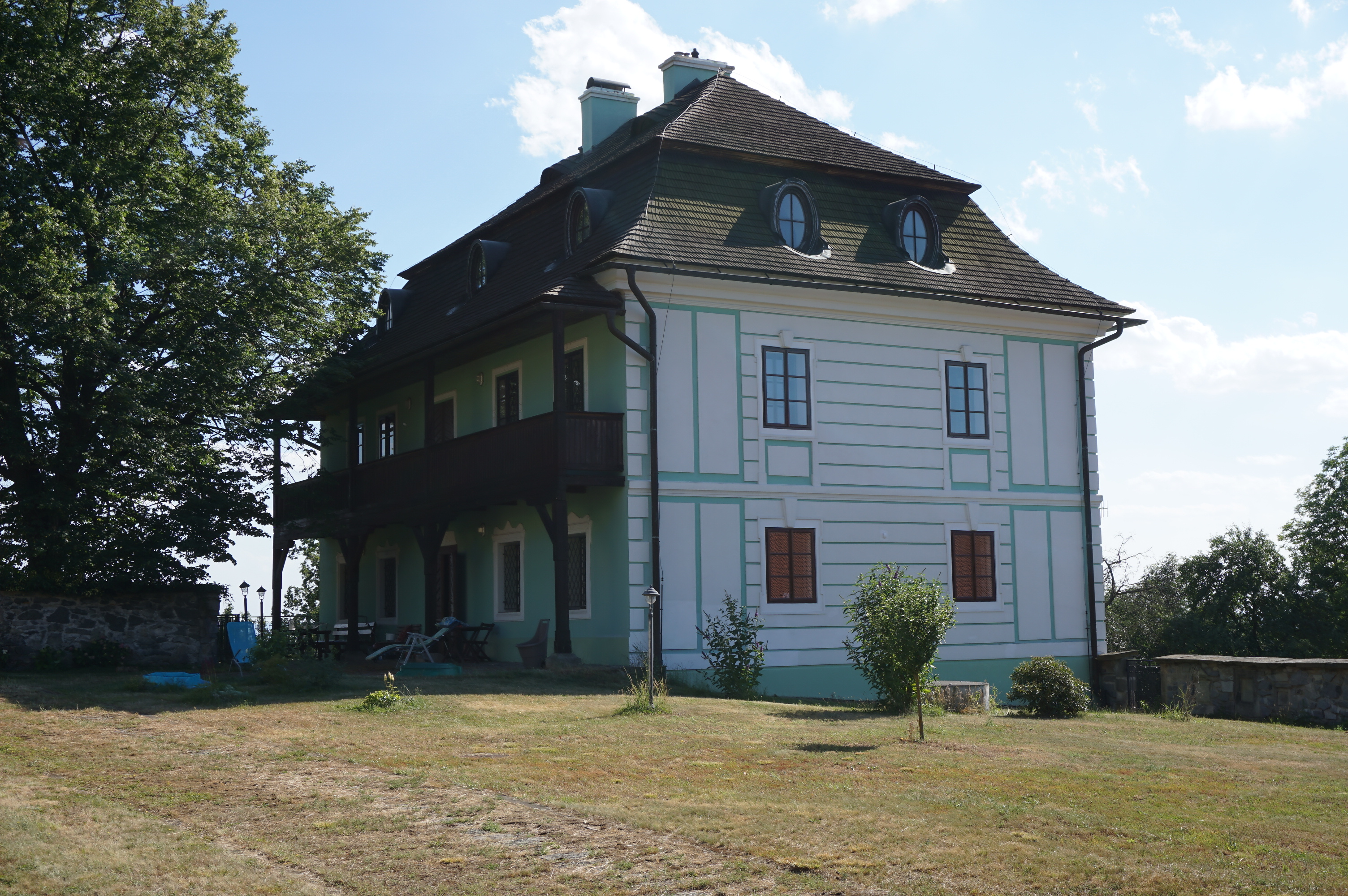
- Baroque rectory

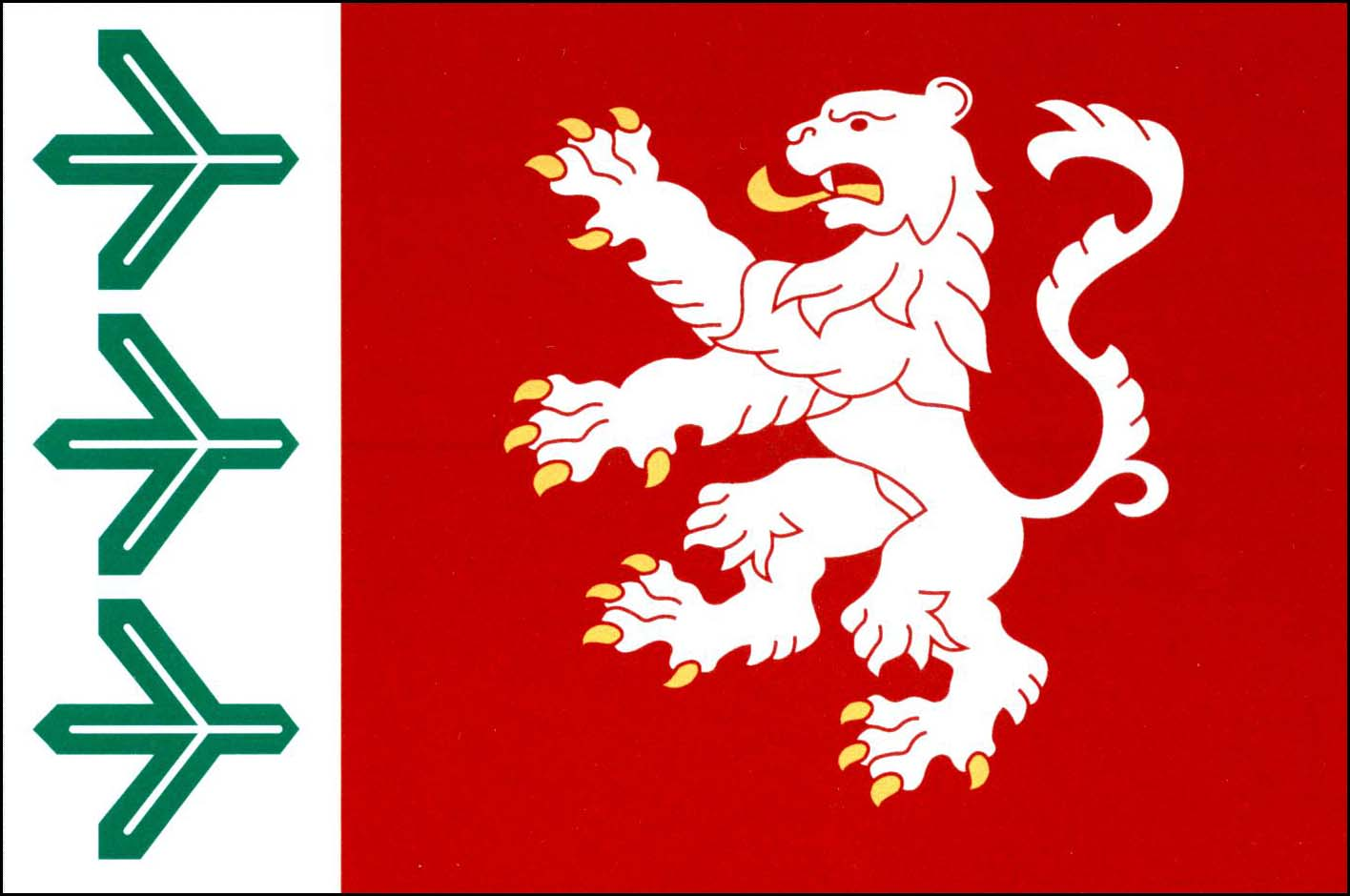
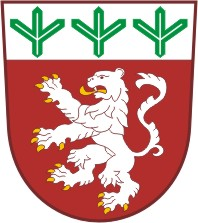
- Flag Coat of arms

- Location in the Czech Republic
- Coordinates: 50°6′33″N 15°58′25″E
- Country: Czech Republic
- Region: Pardubice
- District: Pardubice
- First mentioned: 1336

Area
  - Total: 17.05 km^{2} (6.58 sq mi)
- Elevation: 305 m (1,001 ft)

Population (2026-01-01)
  - Total: 456
  - Density: 26.7/km^{2} (69.3/sq mi)
- Time zone: UTC+1 (CET)
  - Summer (DST): UTC+2 (CEST)
- Postal code: 533 21
- Website: www.vysokechvojno.cz

Vysoké Chvojno is a municipality and village in Pardubice District in the Pardubice Region of the Czech Republic. It has about 500 inhabitants.

== Demographics ==
Historical population
Year	Pop.	±%
1869	450	—
1880	566	+25.8%
1890	640	+13.1%
1900	620	−3.1%
1910	650	+4.8%
1921	642	−1.2%
1930	655	+2.0%
1950	535	−18.3%
1961	537	+0.4%
1970	533	−0.7%
1980	508	−4.7%
1991	417	−17.9%
2001	369	−11.5%
2011	386	+4.6%
2021	428	+10.9%
Source: Censuses
