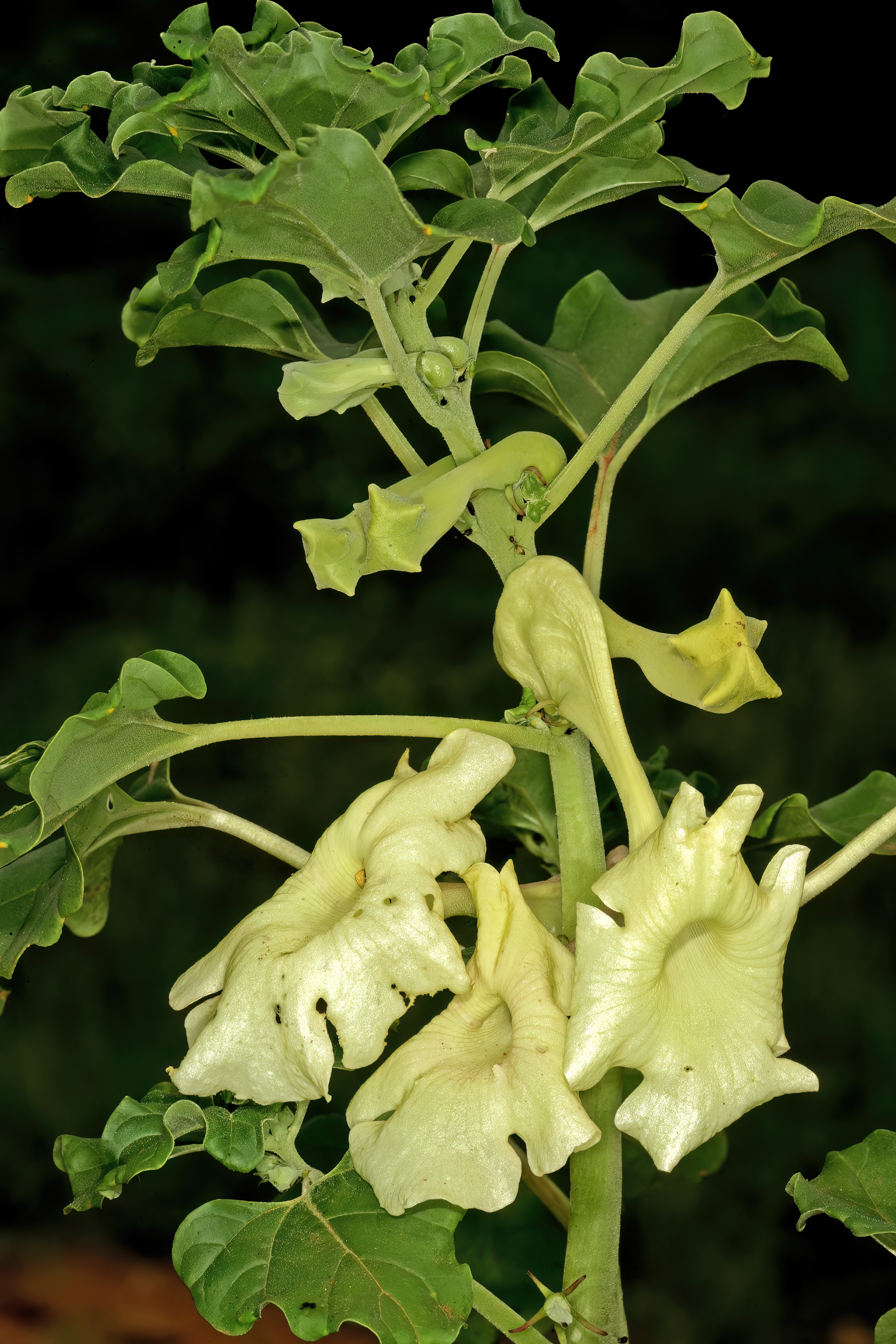

Scientific classification
- Kingdom: Plantae
- Clade: Tracheophytes
- Clade: Angiosperms
- Clade: Eudicots
- Clade: Asterids
- Order: Lamiales
- Family: Pedaliaceae
- Genus: Holubia; Oliv.
- Species: H. saccata

Binomial name
- Holubia saccata Oliv.

= Holubia saccata =

Species of flowering plant

Holubia is a monotypic genus of flowering plants belonging to the family Pedaliaceae. The only species is Holubia saccata.

Its native range is Botswana, Zimbabwe and the Northern Provinces of South Africa.

It is commonly found in disturbed sandy soils along riverbanks and along roadsides.

== General description ==
It is similar in form to Harpagophytum procumbens, another plant in the family of Pedaliaceae. An upright, annual, biennial, or perennial, It grows up to 30–75 cm (12–30 in) tall, with slightly fleshy, square stem and spreading branches. It has opposite leaves, which are also fleshy, circular to ovate shaped. They are petiolate (leaf stalk is long), and spinach-green in colour. They can be up to 7 cm (2.8 in) long, with the petiole reaching 2.5–7 cm (0.98–2.76 in) long. It blooms from summer to autumn, with large, solitary flowers in shades of yellow-green, yellow, cream or white. They have an unpleasant smell. They have a 30–40 mm long, corolla tube that is fox-glove like, and it has a saccate spur, or a flattened sack at the base, which is 30 mm long and 20 mm wide. After flowering, it produces a fruit or seed capsule, that is often tinged with purple, large and angled, or rotund to circular in shape, and up to 5–6 cm (2.0–2.4 in) long, and 5 cm (2.0 in) wide. It has 4 wings. Inside the capsule, is dark brown, or black seeds, which are obovate shaped, 6 mm long and 4 mm wide. They have a leathery seed coat.

== Taxonomy ==
It is known in Tswana language as 'makgabeathutlwa', and in English as 'Sac flower'.

The generic name of 'Holubia' is in honour of Emil Holub (1847–1902), who was Czech medical doctor, explorer, cartographer, and ethnographer in Africa. Also, the specific name of saccata is derived from the Latin saccus, meaning "sac" or "bag", and more specifically "moneybag", which refers to the spurred corolla tube of the flower.

It was first published by Daniel Oliver in Hooker's book Icones Plantarum (Hooker's Icon. Pl.) Vol.15 in table 1475 in 1884.

In 1975, Á. Löve & D. Löve published Holubia as part of the Gentianaceae family in Anales Inst. Bot. Cavanilles Vol.32 on page 226, this has been accepted by many authorities as illegitimate and so mostly ignored.

As of August 2021, the species was unchecked by the Royal Horticultural Society, and the genus of Holubia was verified by United States Department of Agriculture and the Agricultural Research Service on 17 September 1996, but the don't list any species.

== Propagation ==
Holubia saccata can be propagated by seed growing, which take place at any time of the year. It has been recommended that the seed coat should be removed, the blunt end of the seed is then chipped and left in water for a short period of time. When roots start appearing, removed from the water and place the plantlet into small pots filled with sterile soil, or a Coir or sowing mix with added sand or perlite (for drainage). They can be enclosed in plastic wrap and placed under fluorescent lights, for further speedier growth. The pots are then best kept in a greenhouse, with a constant temperature of 20-25 °C and the soil should not dry out.

The only problem is the pest control of Spider mites.

Toxic alkaloids can be found in both leaves and seeds also the seed capsules (fruit) can cause a problem in sheep's wool.

== Other sources ==
- Chapano, C. & Mamuto, M. (2003). Plants of the Chimanimani District National Herbarium and Botanic Garden, Zimbabwe, Page 32.
- Chapano, C. & Mugarisanwa, N.H. (2003). Plants of the Matobo District National Herbarium and Botanic Garden, Zimbabwe, Page 21.
- Ihlenfeldt, H.-D. (1988). Pedaliaceae Flora Zambesiaca 8(3), Pages 89 – 91. (Includes a picture).
- Kirby, G. (2013). Wild Flowers of Southeast Botswana Struik Nature, Cape Town South Africa, Page 213. (Includes a picture).
- Mapaura, A. & Timberlake, J. (eds) (2004). A checklist of Zimbabwean vascular plants Southern African Botanical Diversity Network Report No. 33 Sabonet, Pretoria and Harare, Page 66.
- Setshogo, M.P. (2005). Preliminary checklist of the plants of Botswana. Sabonet Report no. 37. Sabonet, Pretoria and Gaborone, Page 92
- Gideon Smith. (1997). List of Southern African Succulent Plants. Umdaus Press, Page 135
