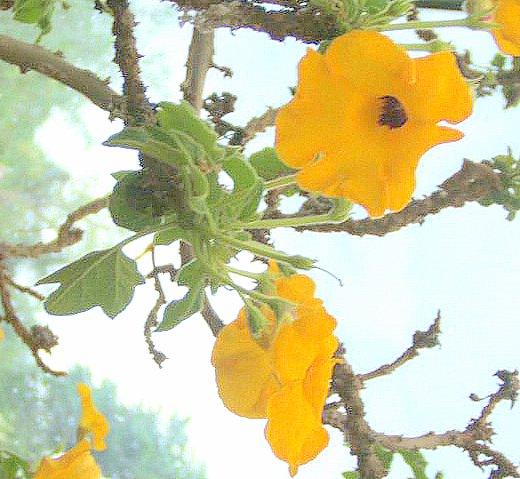
- Uncarina grandidieri

Scientific classification
- Kingdom: Plantae
- Clade: Tracheophytes
- Clade: Angiosperms
- Clade: Eudicots
- Clade: Asterids
- Order: Lamiales
- Family: Pedaliaceae; R.Br.

Genera
- Dewinteria; Harpagophytum; Holubia; Linariopsis; Pedaliodiscus; Pedalium; Pterodiscus; Rogeria; Sesamothamnus; Sesamum; Uncarina

= Pedaliaceae =

Family of flowering plants

Pedaliaceae, the pedalium family or sesame family, is a flowering plant family classified in the order Lamiales. The family includes sesame (Sesamum indicum), the source of sesame seeds.

It comprises 11 genera and approximately 80 species. Eight genera are native to the African continent and one genus (Uncarina) is endemic to Madagascar. Two genera (Sesamum and Pedalium) are mainly African natives but they also include regions to the east (including Madagascar, India, Sri Lanka, Malayan Islands and northern Australia).

The family has a diverse range of seed and fruit dispersal throughout the various species. Including; animal dispersal via burrs, carried by feet (in Harpagophytum) or caught in the fur of passing animals (Uncarina), winged fruits using the wind for dispersal (Holubia and Pterodiscus), or even winged seeds (Sesamothamnus and Sesamum) or via wind-ballists (Rogeria). Wind-ballists are when the fruits open at the top but stay on the plant, then as the stems produce strong movements, the seeds are then gradually expelled.

== Taxonomy ==
The family is in the order Lamiales, as confirmed by the most recent classification of the APG IV system.

The historical Cronquist system placed the family in the Scrophulariales. Cronquist included the family Martyniaceae in Pedaliaceae, but phylogenetic studies have shown that the two families are not closely related and they are maintained as separate by the APG. Both families are characterized by having mucilaginous hairs, which often give the stems and leaves a slimy or clammy feel, and often have fruits with hooks or horns.

== Gallery of Pedaliaceae ==
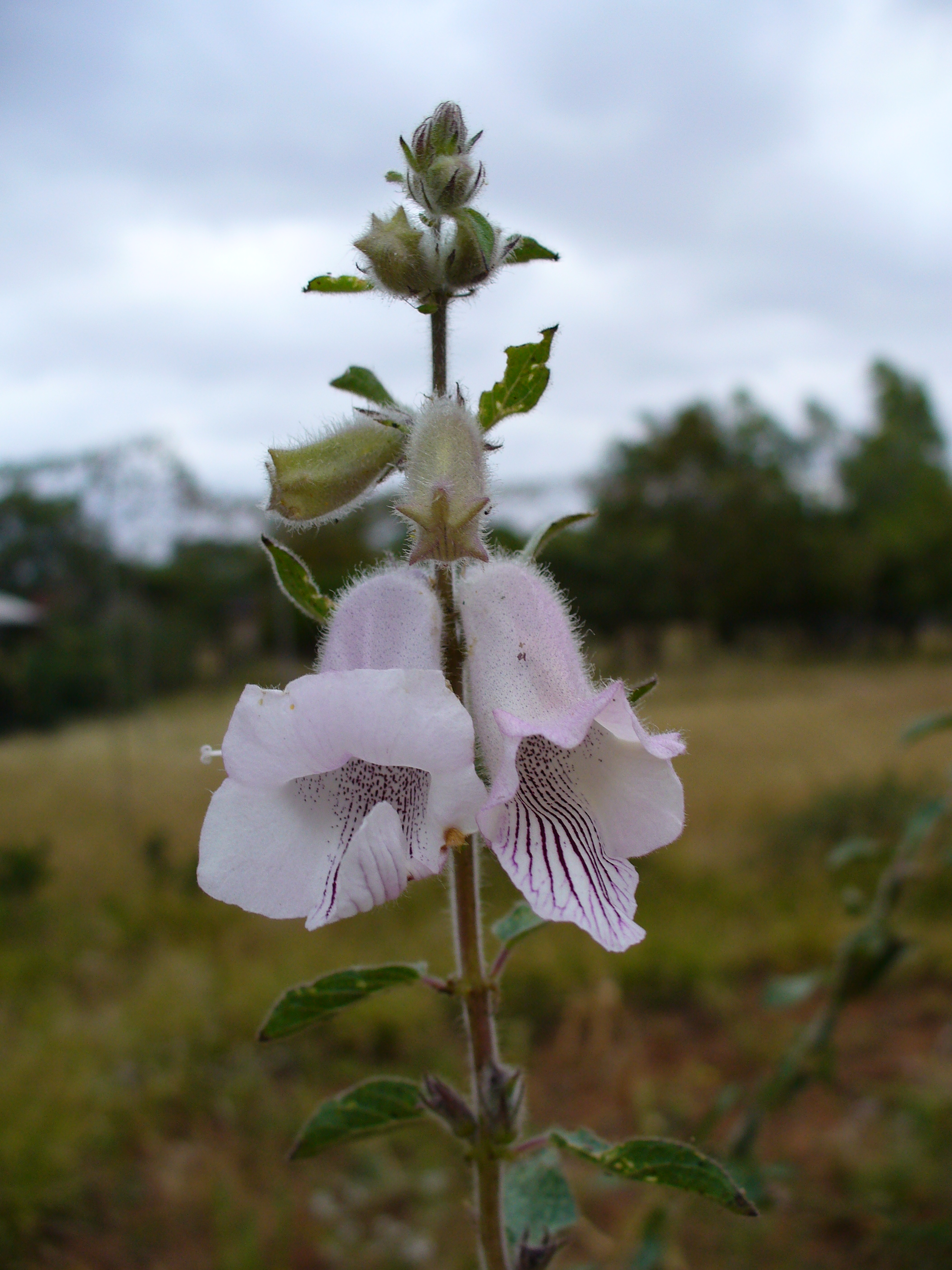
Sesamum trilobum

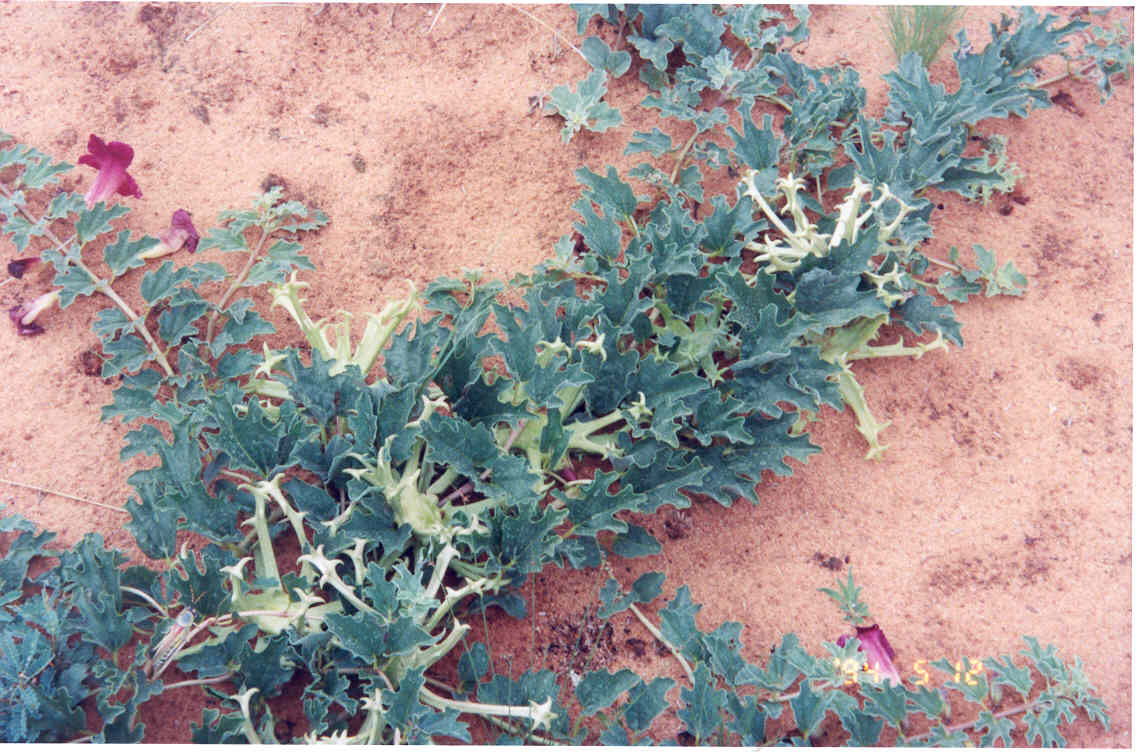
Harpagophytum procumbens

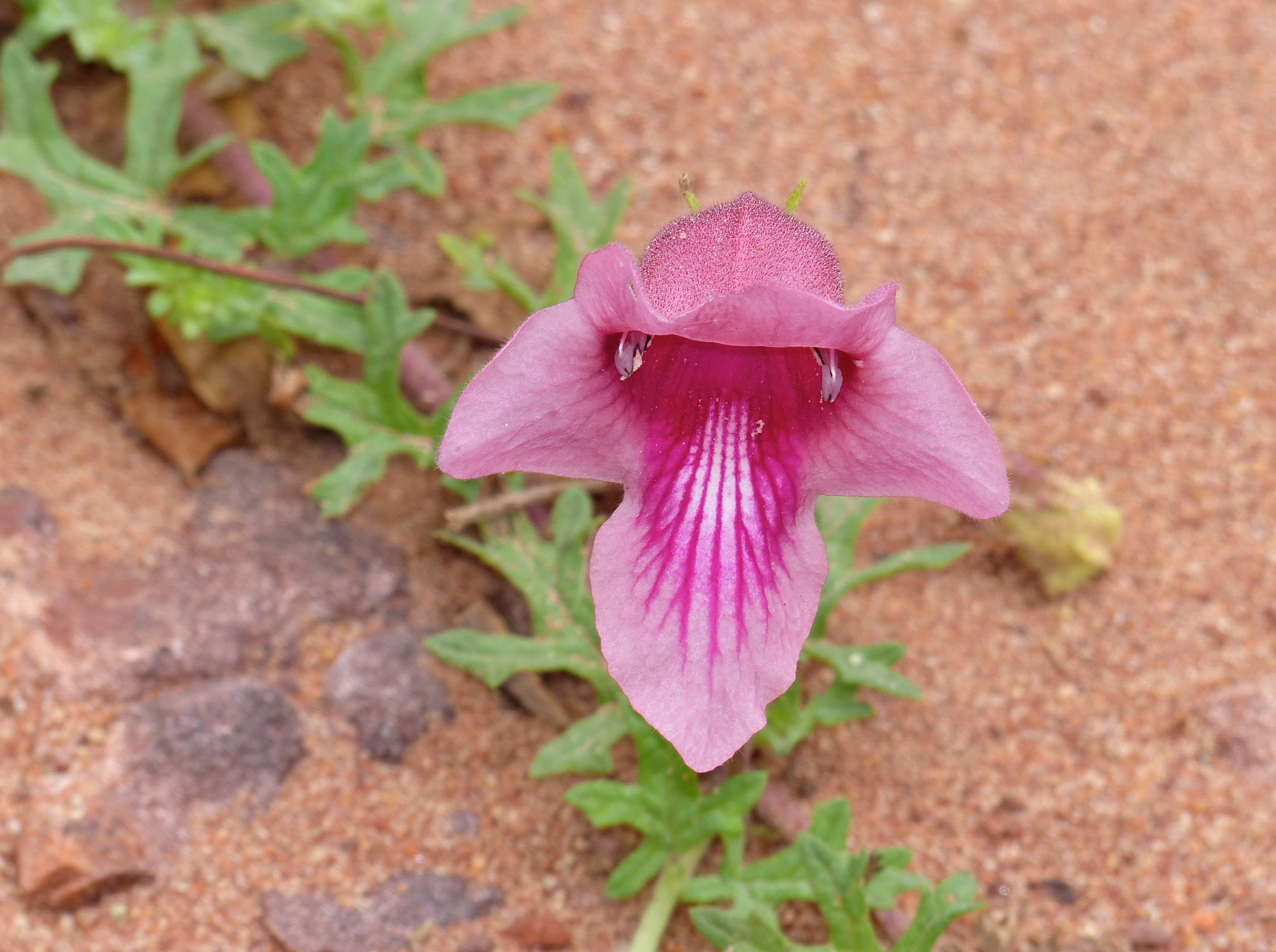
Sesamum senecioides (Devil Thorn)

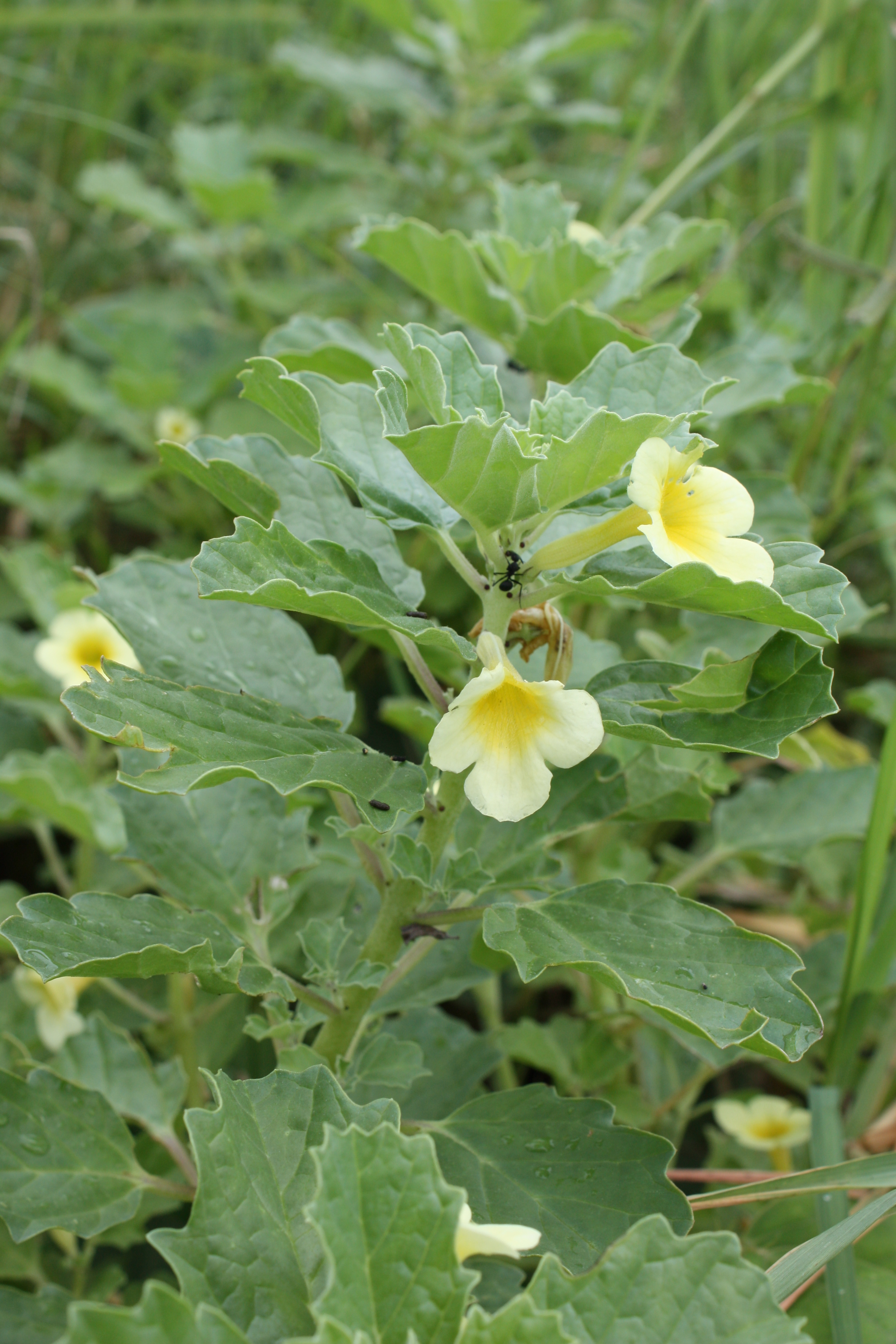
Pedalium murex

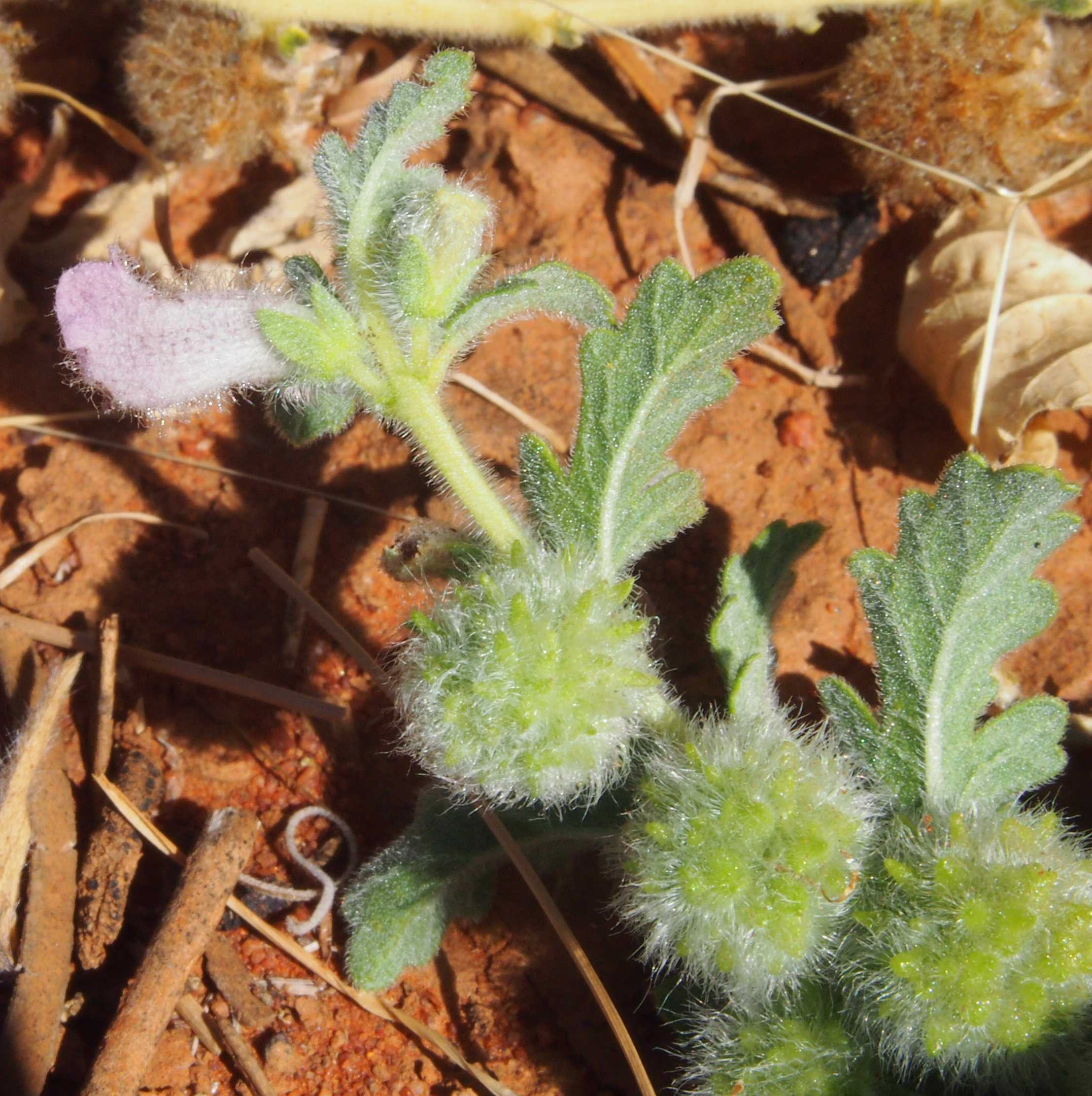
Sesamum eugeniae

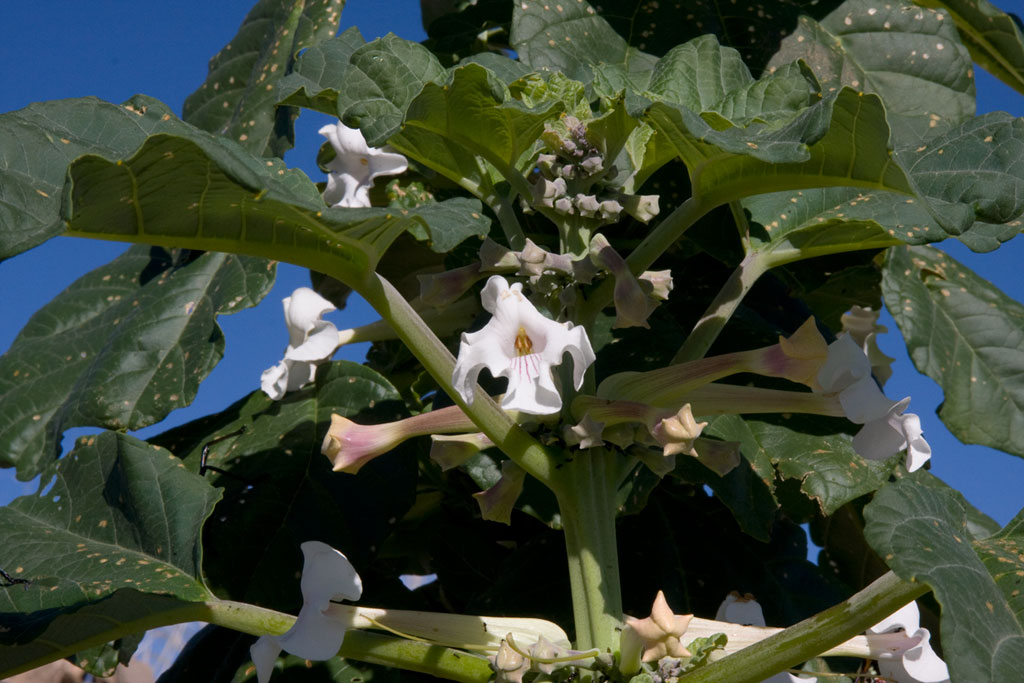
Rogeria longiflora

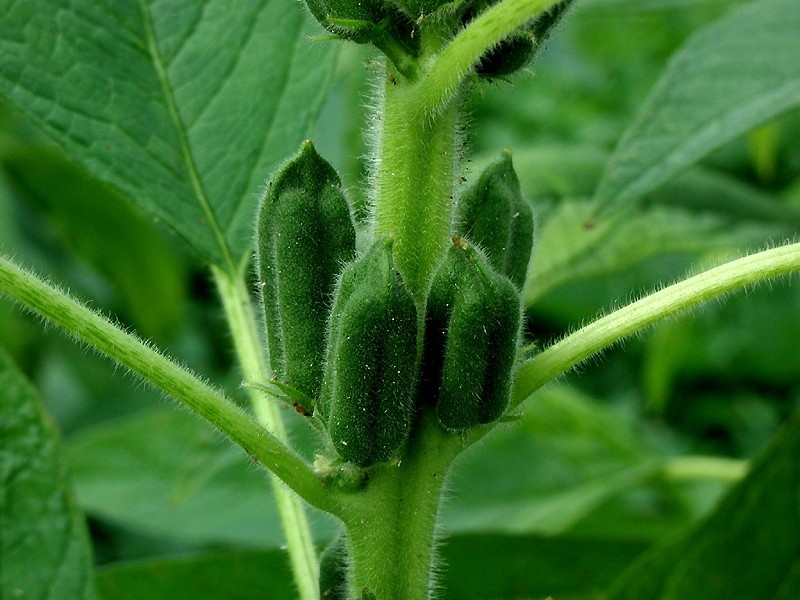
Sesamum indicum

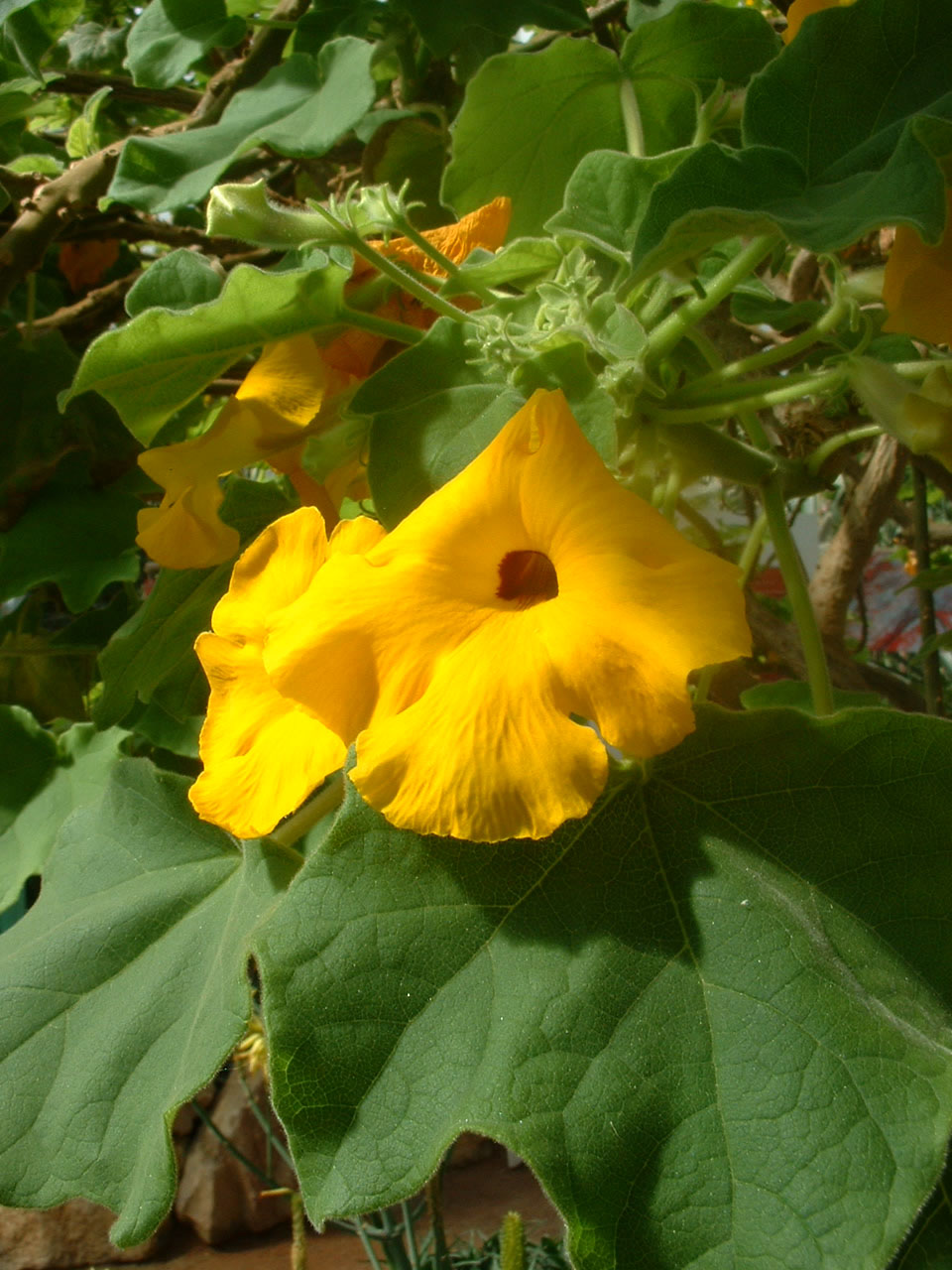
Uncarina grandidieri

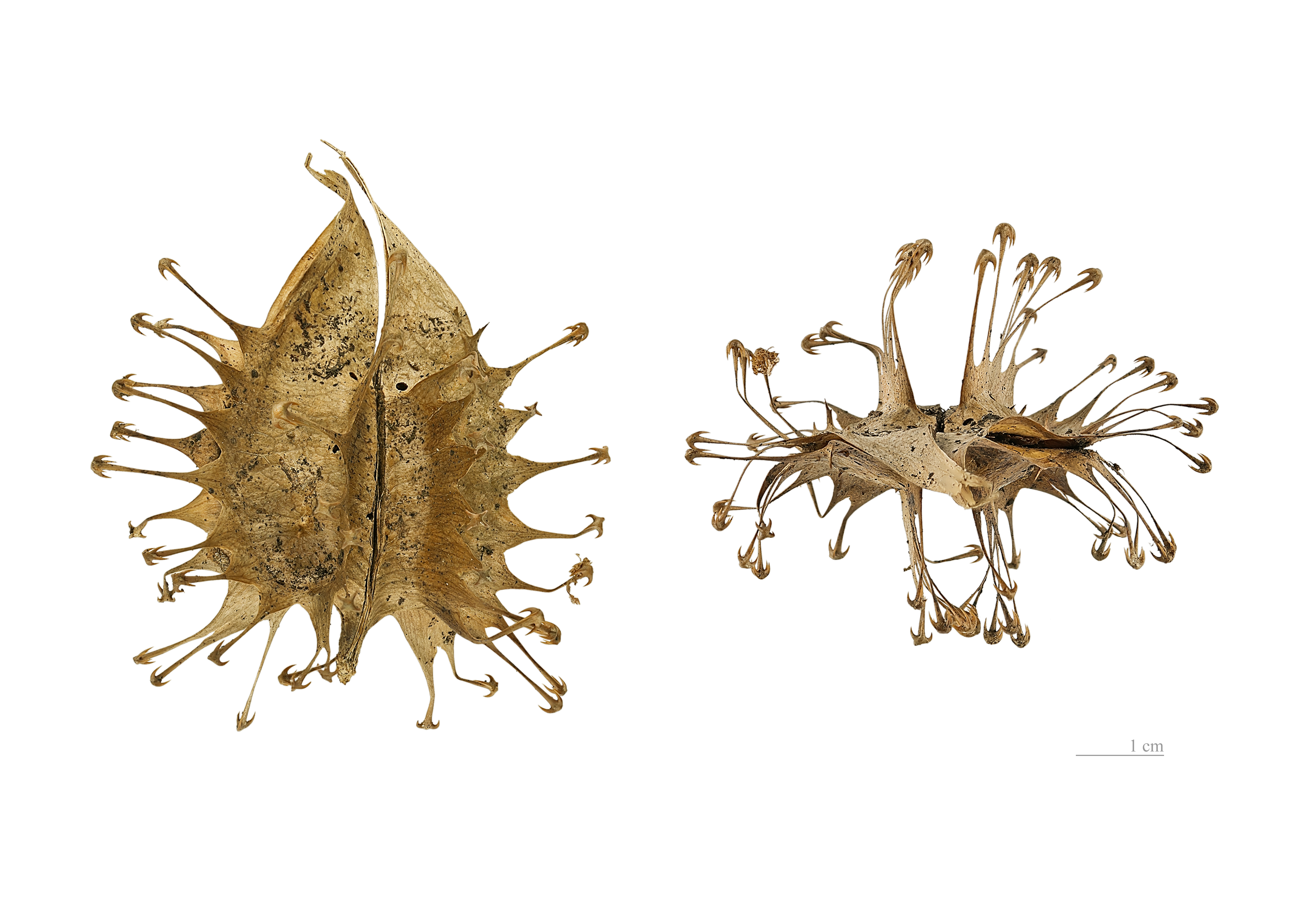
Uncarina ankaranensis

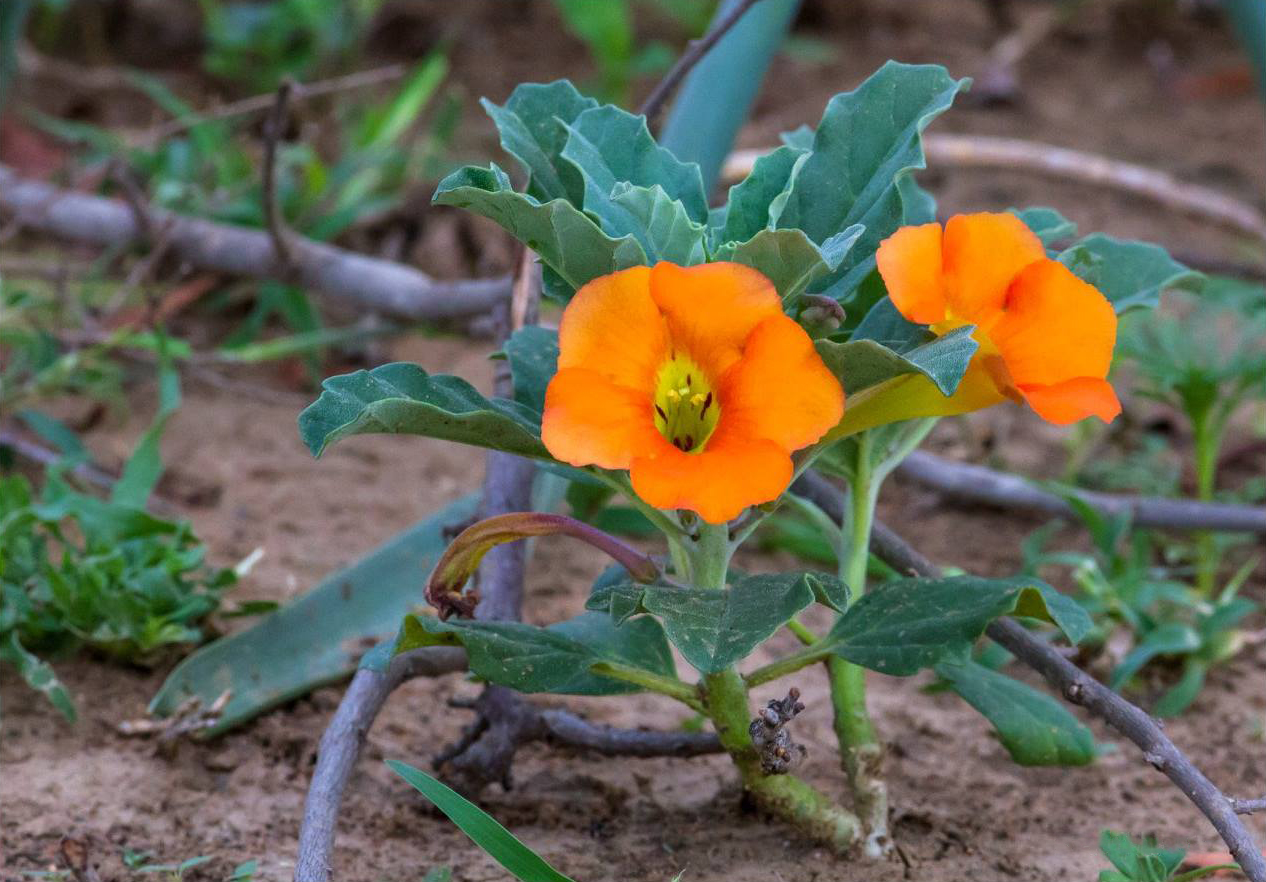
Pterodiscus elliottii
