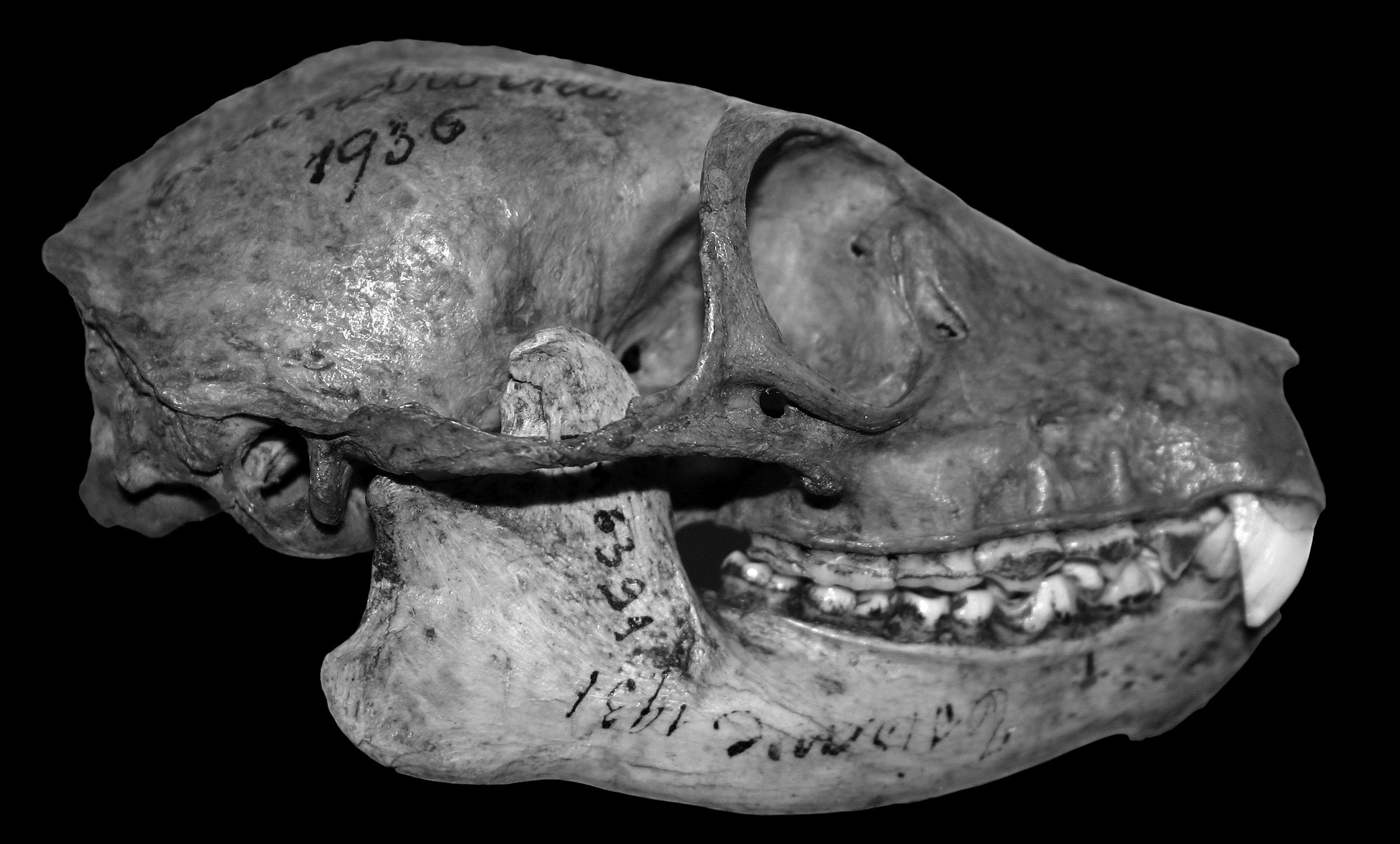
- Right profile view of a Pachylemur insignis skull

Conservation status
- Extinct (680–960 CE)

Scientific classification
- Kingdom: Animalia
- Phylum: Chordata
- Class: Mammalia
- Infraclass: Placentalia
- Order: Primates
- Suborder: Strepsirrhini
- Family: Lemuridae
- Genus: †Pachylemur; Lamberton, 1948

Species
- †P. insignis (Filhol, 1895); Synonyms: Lemur insignis Filhol, 1895; Lemur intermedius Filhol, 1895; †P. jullyi (G. Grandidier, 1899); Synonyms: Palaeochirogalus jullyi G. Grandidier, 1899; Lemur jullyi Standing, 1904; Lemur maxiensis Standing, 1904; Lemur majori Standing, 1908
- Subfossil sites for Pachylemur red = P. insignis; blue = P. jullyi; black = P. sp. (uncertain)

Synonyms
- Palaeochirogalus G. Grandidier, 1899

= Pachylemur =

Pachylemur Temporal range: Pleistocene–Holocene

Extinct genus of lemurs

Pachylemur is an extinct, giant lemur most closely related to the ruffed lemurs of genus Varecia. Two species are known, Pachylemur insignis and Pachylemur jullyi, although there is some doubt as to whether or not they may actually be the same species. Pachylemur is sometimes referred to as the giant ruffed lemur, because although it and the living ruffed lemurs had similar teeth and skeletons, Pachylemur was more robust and as much as three to four times larger. DNA studies have confirmed a sister group relationship between these two types of lemur. Like living ruffed lemurs, Pachylemur specialized in eating fruit, and was therefore an important seed disperser, possibly for tree species with seeds too large for even ruffed lemurs to swallow. In the spiny thickets of southwestern Madagascar, they were also likely to have dispersed seeds evolved to attach to fur and be carried away. Unlike ruffed lemurs, the fore- and hindlimbs of Pachylemur were nearly the same length, and therefore it was likely to be a slow, deliberate climber. However, both used hindlimb suspension to reach fruit on small branches below them.

Like other lemurs, Pachylemur was only found on the island of Madagascar, and its subfossil remains have been found primarily at sites in the central and southwestern parts of the island. Fragmentary and indeterminate remains have also been found in northern Madagascar. Pachylemur once lived in diverse lemur communities within its range, but in many of these locations, 20% or fewer of the original lemur species remain. Pachylemur went into decline following the arrival of humans in Madagascar around 350 BCE. Habitat loss, forest fragmentation, and bushmeat hunting are thought to have been the reasons for its disappearance. Pachylemur is thought to have gone extinct between 680 and 960 CE, although subfossil remains found in a cave pit in southwestern Madagascar may indicate that it survived up until 500 years ago.

Pachylemur remains were first described in 1895 by French zoologist Henri Filhol and were originally included in the genus Lemur, along with the ring-tailed lemur and other close relatives currently classified within the family Lemuridae. In 1948, French paleontologist Charles Lamberton placed the species in the subgenus Pachylemur, which was recognized as a genus by 1979. However, due to earlier uses of the name Pachylemur, the priority of an alternative genus name proposed by Guillaume Grandidier in 1905, and errors in Lamberton's 1948 description of the genus, the availability of the name under the rules of zoological nomenclature was considered questionable. In 2011, a petition was filed with the International Commission on Zoological Nomenclature to preserve the name.

== Evolutionary history ==
Pachylemur was similar to but significantly larger and more robust than living ruffed lemurs (genus Varecia). In addition to their general morphology, studies of their teeth (dental anatomy) also suggest a close relation. In 1953, William Charles Osman Hill noted that the skull of both P. insignis and P. jullyi (then called Lemur insignis and L. jullyi) resembled that of ruffed lemurs more so than the rest of the lemurs classified in the genus Lemur at that time.

Because of the similarities, Pachylemur is sometimes referred to as a giant ruffed lemur. In addition to the morphological similarities, molecular studies also support a close relationship. Based on studies of their DNA, Pachylemur and ruffed lemurs form the sister group relative to the rest of the lemurs in the family Lemuridae. This sister group itself forms a sister group with the clade (related group) containing brown lemurs (Eulemur), the ring-tailed lemur (Lemur), the greater bamboo lemur (Prolemur), and the lesser bamboo lemurs (Hapalemur).

=== Taxonomic classification ===
French zoologist Henri Filhol was the first to scientifically describe a species of Pachylemur; he named Lemur insignis and Lemur intermedius in 1895 on the basis of a few subfossil bones. Descriptions of other species now placed in Pachylemur quickly followed. In 1899, Guillaume Grandidier named a new genus and species, Palaeochirogalus jullyi, (Note: Spelling corrected by Zijlstra, Groves & Dunkel 2011, p. 276.) on the basis of two teeth from Antsirabe, central Madagascar, which he thought similar to dwarf lemurs (Cheirogaleus). In 1903, Grafton Elliot Smith placed this species in the genus Lemur (as Lemur jullyi), and in 1905, Grandidier himself considered the species a synonym of Lemur insignis.

Phylogeny of family Lemuridae

- Lemuridae
  - - Varecia (ruffed lemurs)
    - †Pachylemur
  - - - - Lemur (ring-tailed lemur)
        - Prolemur (greater bamboo lemur)
        - Hapalemur (lesser bamboo lemurs)
      - Eulemur (brown lemurs)

Ruffed lemurs are the closest living relatives of Pachylemur, and both form a sister group to the other lemurids.

Meanwhile, in 1904, Herbert F. Standing had named a different species using the same name, Lemur jullyi, and named another species Lemur maziensis. He noted similarities between this group and the ruffed lemurs, then considered a single species, Lemur varius. In 1908, Standing named another species in the group, Lemur majori, and included his Lemur maziensis in L. jullyi. The name Pachylemur was introduced for these animals in 1948 by Charles Lamberton, who grouped Lemur insignis, Lemur majori, and Lemur jullyi in a subgenus of the genus Lemur.

Since 1979, Pachylemur has generally been regarded as a distinct genus, but some classifications include the genus in Lemur or the ruffed lemur genus Varecia. In a 1982 review, Ian Tattersall recognized two species, Lemur insignis and Lemur jullyi. He did not regard Pachylemur as a distinct genus or even subgenus. As Tattersall noted, Lemur jullyi Standing, 1904, is preoccupied by Palaeochirogalus jullyi Grandidier, 1899, and thus invalid. However, both names are based on material from the central plateau of Madagascar and Tattersall therefore presumed that they belong to the same species, which he could continue to call Lemur jullyi. Recent classifications recognize Pachylemur as a valid genus with two species—P. insignis (Filhol, 1895) and P. jullyi (Grandidier, 1899)—but express doubt about the distinction between the two species.

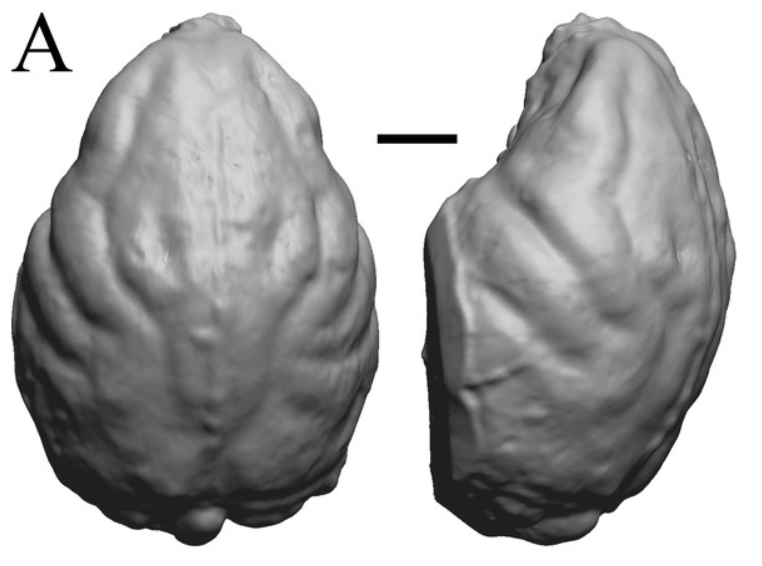
Endocast of the cranial cavity of Pachylemur insignis (FMNH PM 59253).

There are several nomenclatural problems with the current use of the name Pachylemur. First, Filhol had himself used the name Pachylemur in 1874 for a group of primitive primates, including Adapis, that he considered intermediate between pachyderms and lemurs. Several other authors mentioned this name in the 19th and early 20th centuries, but it is questionable that any rendered the name available under the rules of zoological nomenclature. Still, this name potentially renders Pachylemur Lamberton, 1948, invalid under the Principle of Homonymy. In addition, the generic name Palaeochirogalus Grandidier, 1899, predates Pachylemur Lamberton, 1948, by half a century and thus takes precedence under the Principle of Priority, and Pachylemur Lamberton is itself unavailable because Lamberton failed to select a type species. To conserve the name Pachylemur, Jelle Zijlstra, Colin Groves, and Alex Dunkel submitted a petition to the International Commission on Zoological Nomenclature in 2011. The petition asks the Commission to suppress the names Pachylemur Filhol, 1874, Pachylemur Palmer, 1904 (based on Filhol's name), and Palaeochirogalus Grandidier, 1899, and to make Pachylemur Lamberton, 1948, retroactively available with Lemur insignis as its type species.

== Anatomy and physiology ==
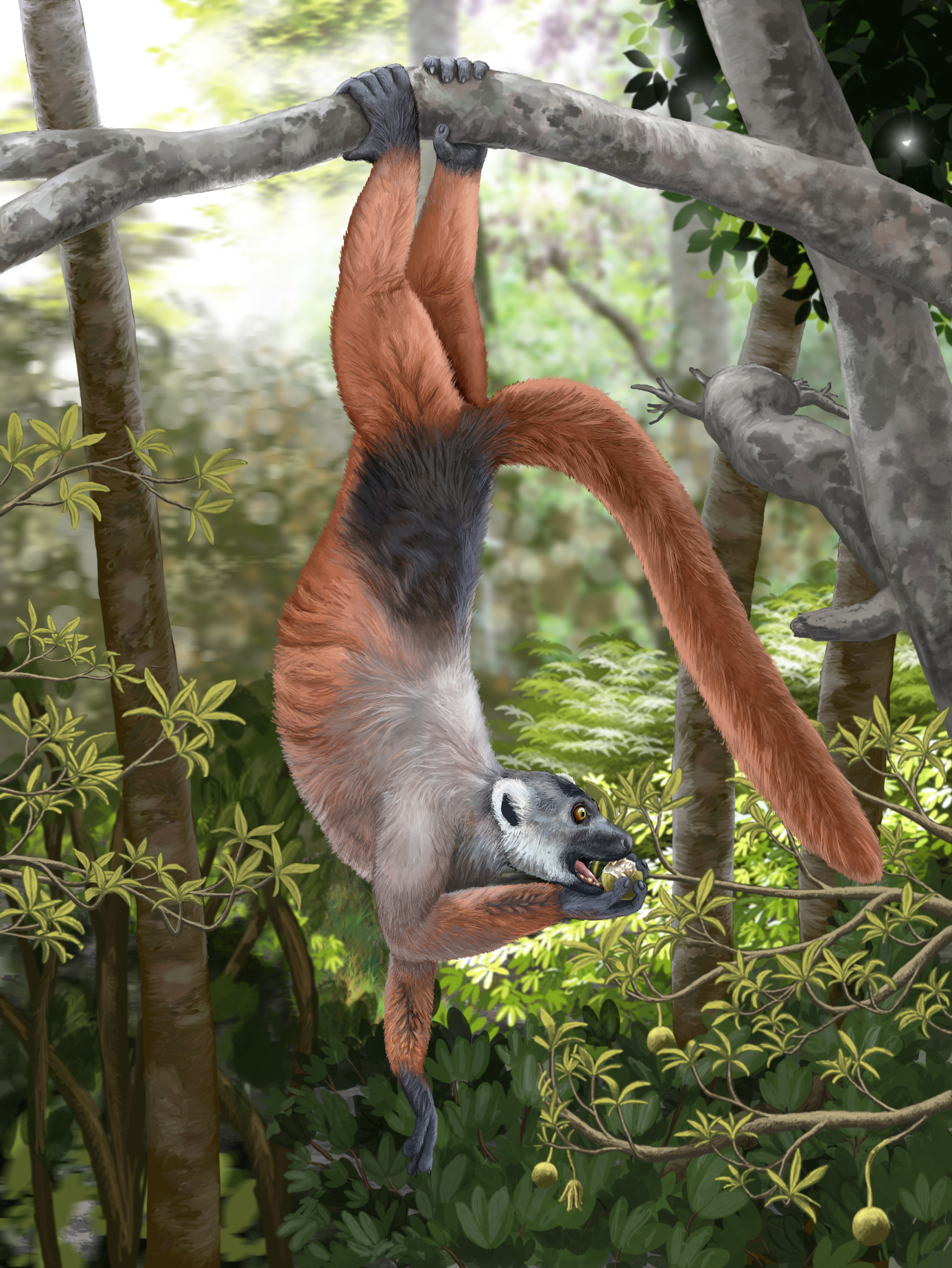
Restoration of Pachylemur insignis

Pachylemur resembled the living ruffed lemurs but was three or four times larger, with an estimated body mass of 10 kg (22 lb) for P. insignis and 13 kg (29 lb) for the larger P. jullyi. In addition, the skeleton is more robust.

The dental formula is 2.1.3.32.1.3.3, as in all lemurids. The toothcomb—a comblike structure formed by the lower front teeth, characteristic of lemurs and lorisoids—is similar to that of other lemurids. The two halves of the mandible (lower jaw) do not fuse at the mandibular symphysis. However, there are some differences in tooth morphology from the living brown and ring-tailed lemurs, similar to those between the ruffed lemurs and the other genera. In Pachylemur, the talonid basin (a basin at the back end of the lower molars) is more elongate, and it is not lined by an entoconid cusp. In the first two upper molars, the lingual cingulum (a shelf on the inner, or lingual, side of the tooth) is expanded towards the front. The two species differ in details of tooth morphology. P. insignis had narrower lower premolars and molars, and the buccal (outer) cusps on these teeth are located to the front of their lingual counterparts. Relative to the ruffed lemurs, Pachylemur has more massive jaws and larger molars.

The skull of Pachylemur is relatively broad, but the orbits (eye sockets) are smaller and oriented more towards the front than in the ruffed lemurs. In the postcranial skeleton, the most distinctive traits of Pachylemur are found. It had shorter and more robust limbs than the ruffed lemurs, and the fore- and hindlimbs were closer in length (intermembral index of approximately 97).

Compared to the axial skeleton of ruffed lemurs, the vertebrae of Pachylemur had shorter vertebral bodies and the spinous process had less anticliny. The head of its femur (thigh bone) was also relatively large. As of 2001, no bones of the digits had been found for either species.

== Behavior ==
Based on dental wear and the presence of dental caries, Pachylemur was likely a fruit specialist, just like the closely related ruffed lemurs, but unlike most of the other leaf-eating, extinct, giant lemurs of Madagascar. Although it primarily ate fruit, as evidenced by dental wear showing it was a mainly frugivorous mixed feeder, it may have supplemented its diet with leaves and other foliage seasonally. Its teeth were similar in appearance to that of ruffed lemurs, while its molars and uneven dental wear suggest that it ate fewer leaves and more hard fruits and stems than today's brown lemur species.

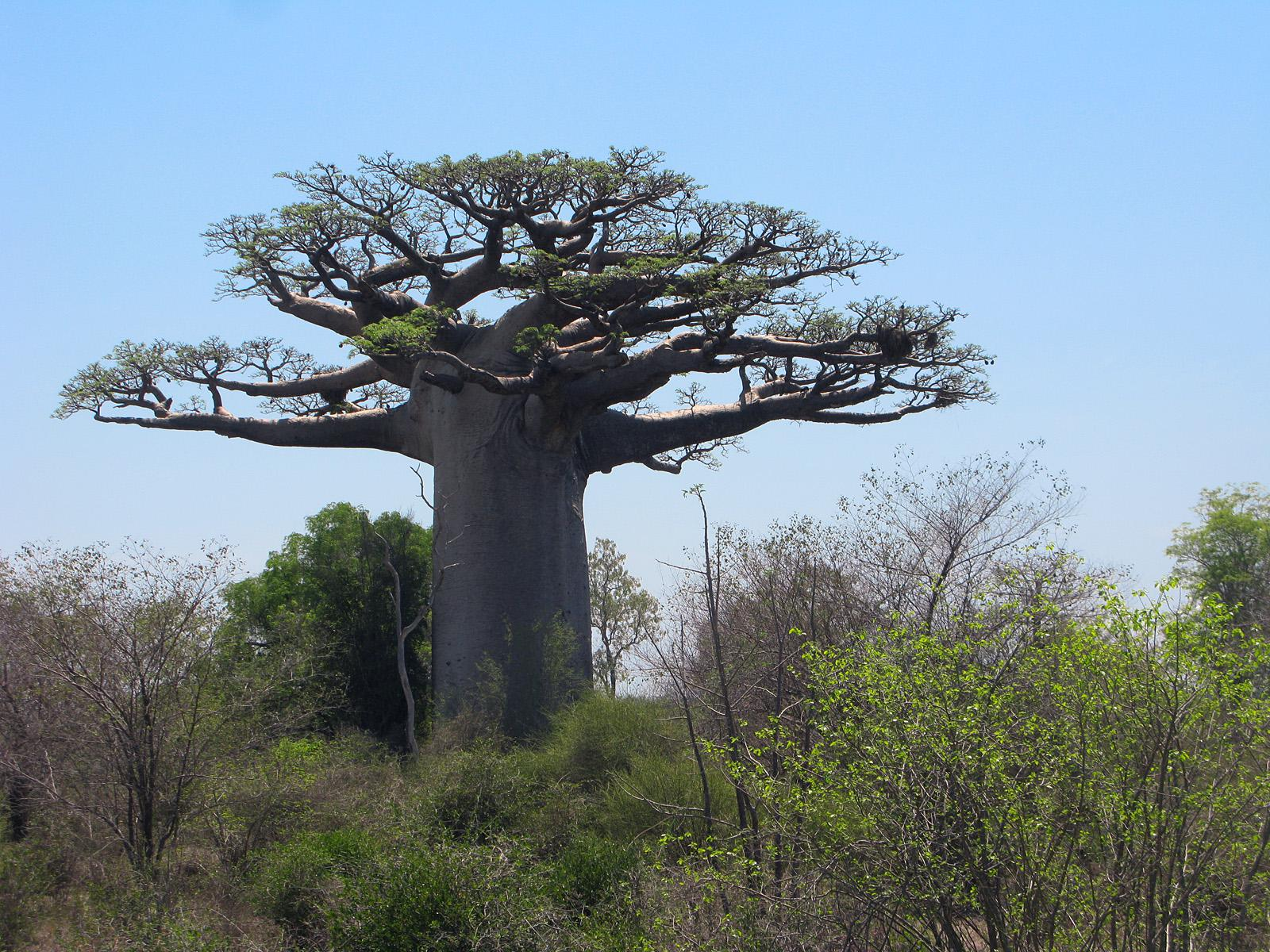
Baobabs in the Madagascar spiny thickets may have once relied on Pachylemur to distribute its large seeds.

Because it ate larger, harder, more fibrous fruits than ruffed lemurs, Pachylemur was likely an important seed disperser compared to the more folivorous extinct giant lemurs. Within the spiny thickets of southwest Madagascar, only P. insignis and Archaeolemur majori, a type of extinct monkey lemur, are suspected of having been large-seed dispersers, particularly for plants that use a form of photosynthesis known as C_{3} carbon fixation. The plants that may have depended on these giant extinct lemurs include Adansonia (baobabs), Cedrelopsis, Commiphora, Delonix, Diospyros, Grewia, Pachypodium, Salvadora, Strychnos, Tamarindus, and Uncarina.

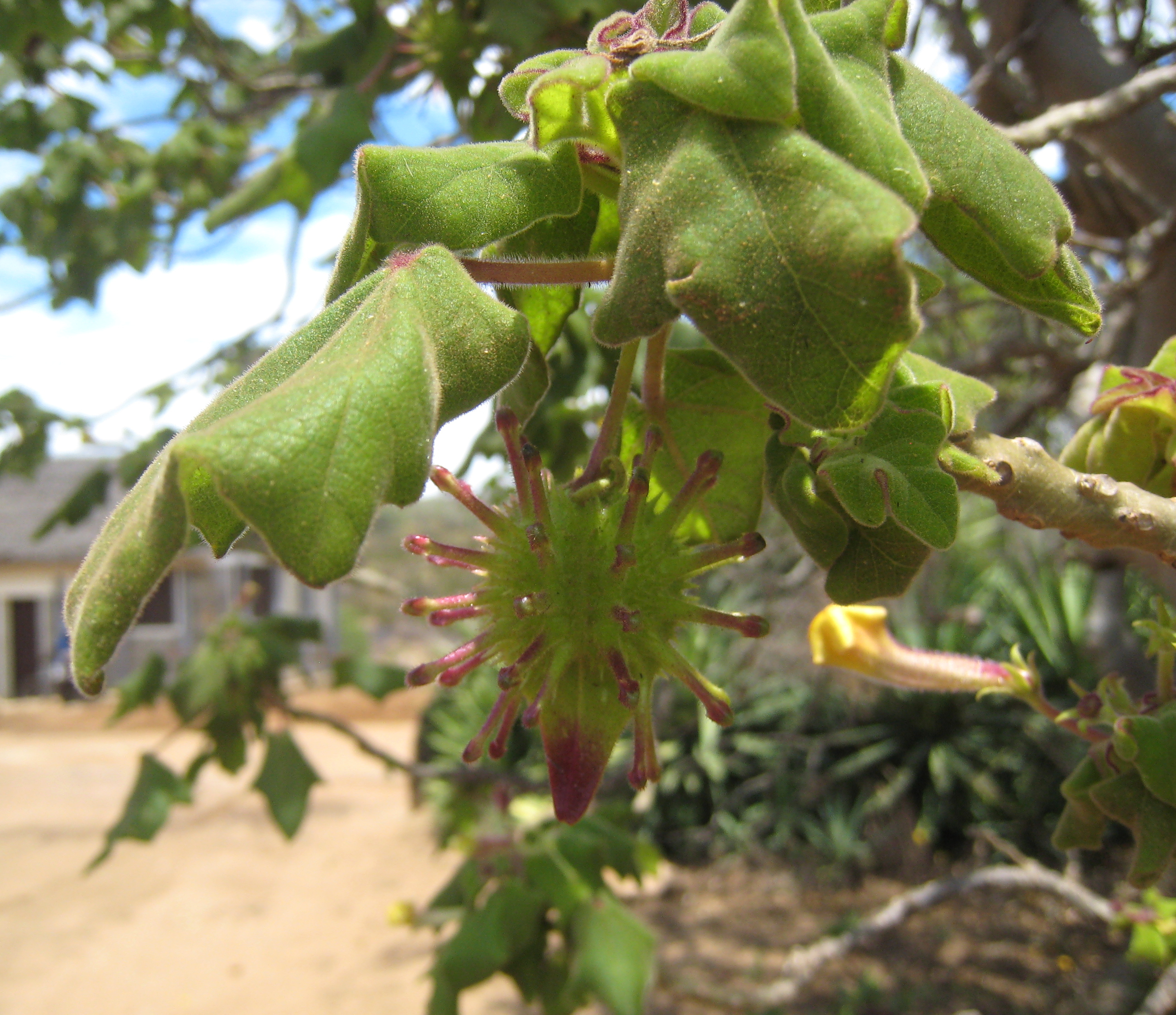
Pachylemur may have spread seeds of plants like Uncarina roeoesliana by carrying them on their fur.

Black-and-white ruffed lemurs can swallow seeds with a diameter up to 30 millimeters (1.2 in), which is larger than any other living lemur. Having been more than twice as large, Pachylemur would have been capable of swallowing even larger seeds. In the case of baobabs, the fruits have large seeds surrounded by a nutritious pulp and may have required seed dispersal through ingestion. In western Madagascar, the genetic diversity of Commiphora guillaminii suggests it had more widespread seed dispersal in the past, but today shows signs of more localized diversity when compared to African species within the same genus that have not lost their seed dispersers.

Many small trees and shrubs in the spiny thickets, such as endemic Uncarina, conserve water by producing seeds with hooks and spines rather than fleshy fruits. These seeds attach themselves to the skin and fur of passing animals for dispersal, and are still dispersed by living lemur species as well as introduced species such as cattle. Pachylemur may also have helped disperse seeds in this fashion.

For many years, palaeoanthropologists thought that Pachylemur was a ground-dwelling lemur due to its robust postcranial skeleton. Yet more recent analysis of its axial and appendicular skeleton—particularly the vertebrae and femur—suggests that it was a tree-dweller (arboreal). Like the ruffed lemurs, Pachylemur was also an arboreal quadruped that frequently exhibited hindlimb suspension in order to reach fruit and leaves on smaller branches. However, Pachylemur was a slow, deliberate climber unlike the ruffed lemurs, which leap and bound through the upper canopy. Like both the living and extinct lemurs, Pachylemur likely conserved energy because of its diet, small brain, and slow climbing.

Because its eyes were comparable in size to those of modern day-living (diurnal) lemurs, Pachylemur was probably diurnal as well, as were most of the giant, extinct lemurs. However, compared to similarly sized anthropoid primates, its visual acuity was relatively poor.

== Distribution and habitat ==
The subfossil remains of Pachylemur have been found in all regions of Madagascar, except in the eastern rainforests where no subfossil sites are known. The two species are typically found in the spiny thickets and succulent woodlands of southern/southwestern Madagascar (P. insignis) and the subhumid forests of the central highlands (P. jullyi), although other indeterminate or fragmentary remains have been discovered at Ankilitelo Cave in southwestern Madagascar, as well as in the dry deciduous forests at Amparihingidro in the northwest (possibly P. insignis) and Ankarana in the northern tip of the island (possibly P. jullyi).

Subfossil sites with P. insignis include Andolonomby, Beloha (near Anavoha), Bemafandry, Andrahomana, Manombo-Toliara, Ambolisatra, Ambararata-Mahabo, Ampoza-Ankazoabo, Belo-sur-mer, Lamboharana, Taolambiby, Tsiandroina, and Tsirave in south and southwestern Madagascar. P. jullyi has been recorded at Ampasambazimba, Antsirabe, and Morarano-Betafo in the central highlands of Madagascar.

In general, lemur diversity has declined since the arrival of humans due to habitat loss, forest fragmentation, and bushmeat hunting. At some subfossil sites, Pachylemur lived alongside as many as 19 or 20 other lemur species, but now as few as 20% of those species remain in those areas.

== Extinction ==
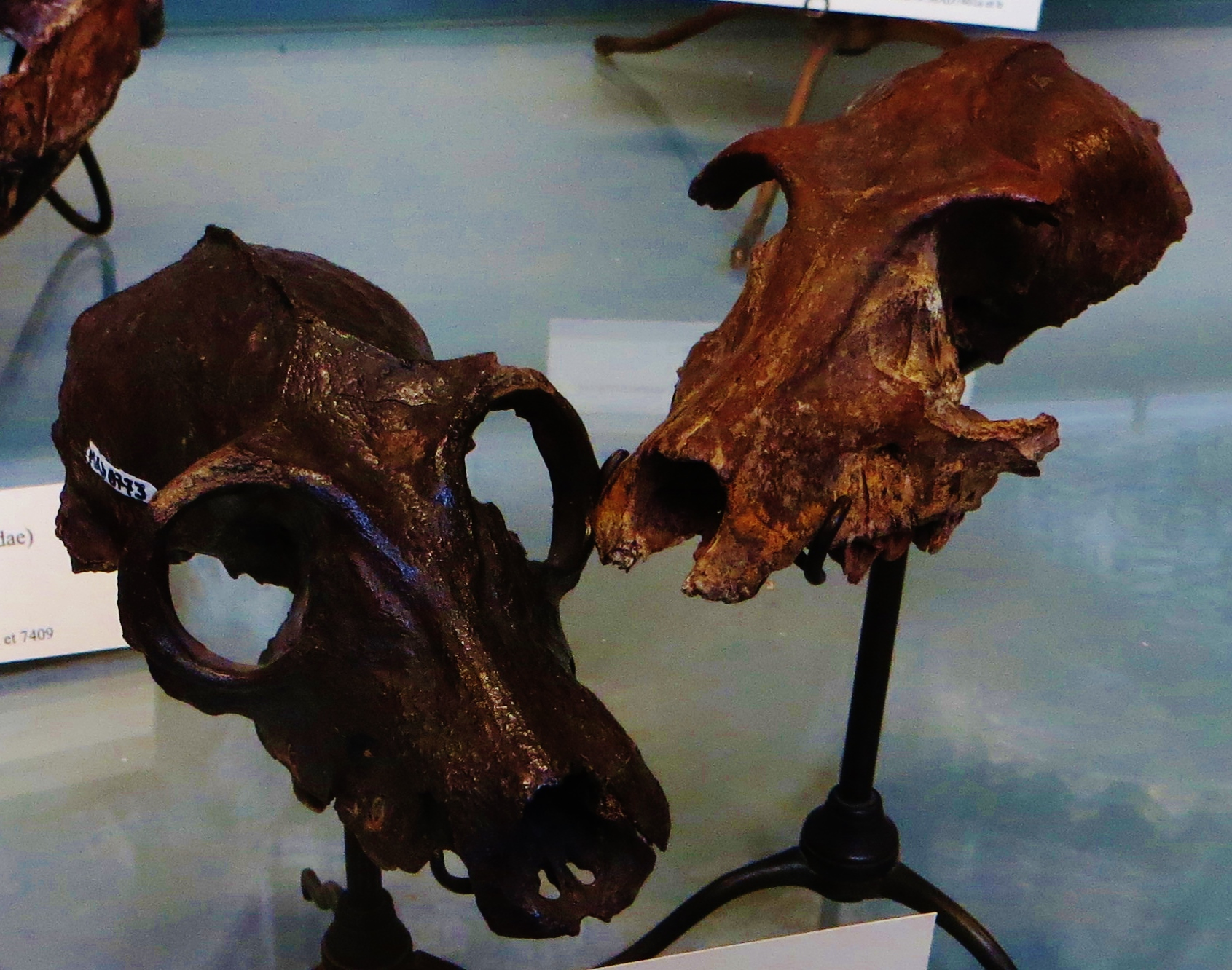
Two P. insignis skulls, Musee d'Histoire Naturelle, Paris

Humans arrived in Madagascar around 350 BCE, but did not cause the extinction of Pachylemur and the other giant lemurs immediately. Instead, many human-related factors, such as habitat loss, forest fragmentation, bushmeat hunting, and the introduction of invasive species, along with the gradual desiccation of certain parts of the island, caused their decline and eventual extinction over more than a millennium. The same factors threaten all living lemur species today.

The initial decline of Pachylemur began within 500 years of human colonization, but prior to the establishment of large human settlements. Hunting in the Central Highlands and the spiny thickets likely caused a substantial drop in its population. Large lemurs, including Pachylemur, survived in the Central Highlands, succulent woodlands, and spiny thickets until around 950 CE. Based on radiocarbon dating of subfossil remains collected as of 2010, the most recent remains of P. insignis out of 17 dated specimens came from Ankilibehandry in the succulent woodlands and dated between 680 and 780 CE. Of eight dated specimens, the most recent remains of P. jullyi came from Ampasambazimba in the Central Highlands and dated between 620 and 680 CE. Pachylemur is generally thought to have gone extinct between 680–960 CE, but remains of P. insignis have been found in Ankilitelo Cave (a pit cave in southwestern Madagascar), which is assumed to be less than 500 years old.
