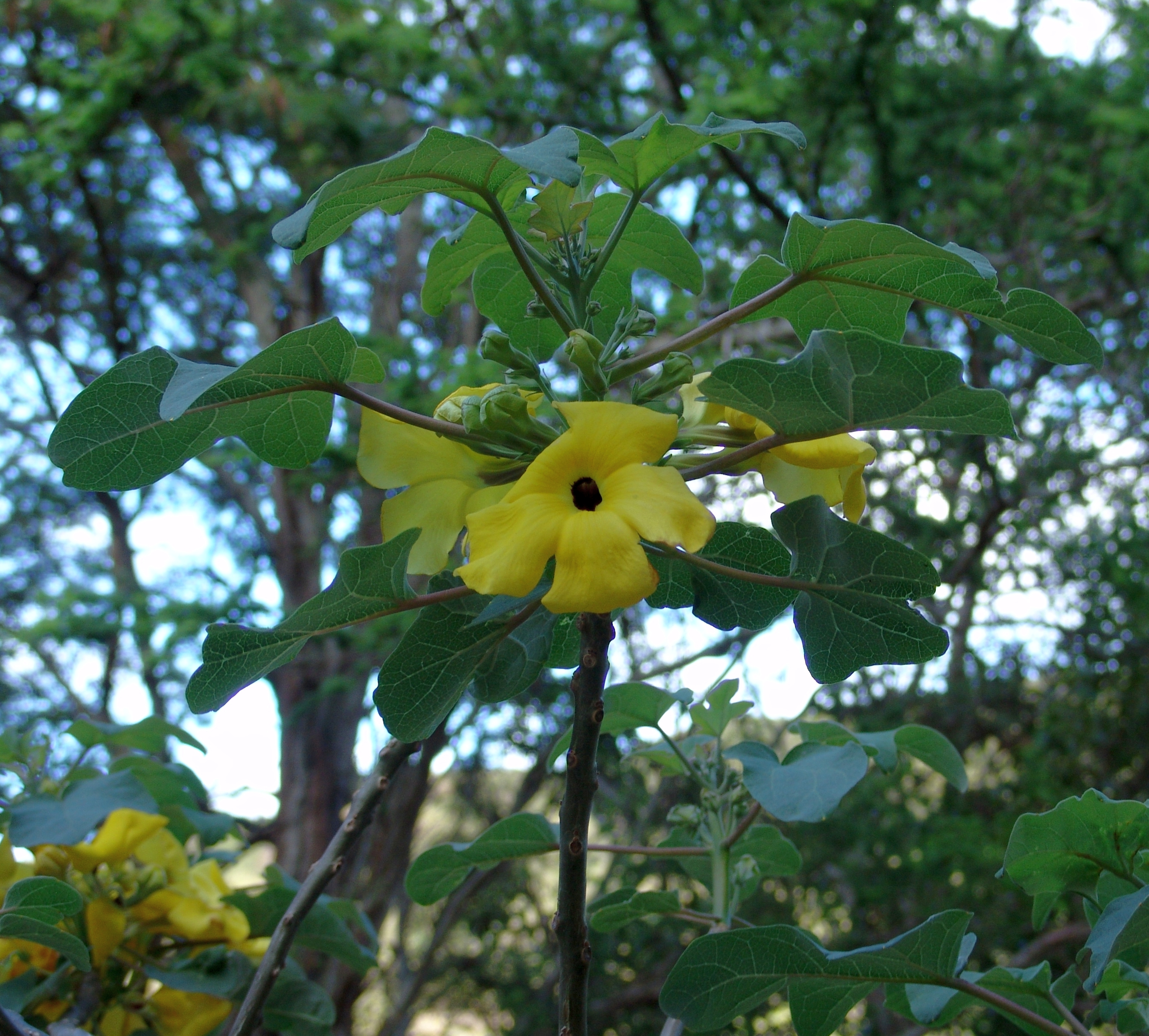

Scientific classification
- Kingdom: Plantae
- Clade: Tracheophytes
- Clade: Angiosperms
- Clade: Eudicots
- Clade: Asterids
- Order: Lamiales
- Family: Pedaliaceae
- Genus: Uncarina
- Species: U. peltata

Binomial name
- Uncarina peltata (Baker) Stapf

Synonyms
- Harpagophytum peltatum Baker Uncaria peltata (Baker) Kuntze

= Uncarina peltata =

Mouse trap tree

Species of flowering plant

Uncarina peltata, also known as farehitse or mousetrap tree, is a sesame relative native to Madagascar.

== See also ==
- Uncarina decaryi
