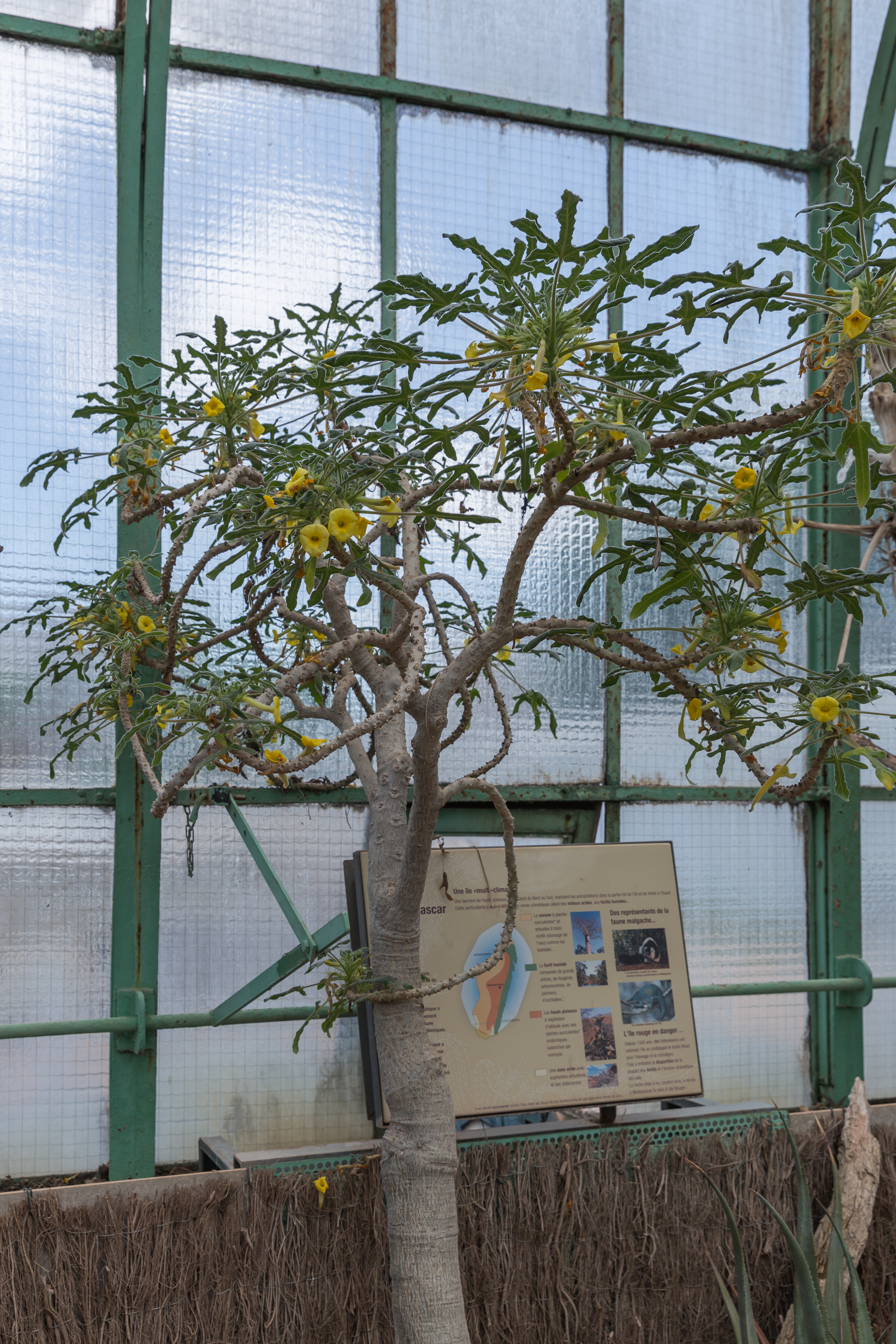
- Uncarina roeoesliana at the Jardin botanique de Lyon, France.

Scientific classification
- Kingdom: Plantae
- Clade: Tracheophytes
- Clade: Angiosperms
- Clade: Eudicots
- Clade: Asterids
- Order: Lamiales
- Family: Pedaliaceae
- Genus: Uncarina
- Species: U. roeoesliana

Binomial name
- Uncarina roeoesliana Rauh. (1996)

= Uncarina roeoesliana =

Wild sweet potato

Species of flowering plant

Uncarina roeoesliana, also called wild sweet potato, is a species of Uncarina native to the regions of Anosy and Toliara in Madagascar.

== Description ==
It is a semi-succulent tree that can grow up to 50 ft (15 m) high. Its leaves are palmate, which almost looks like fig leaves.

== Distribution ==
It is native to the regions of Anosy and Toliara in Madagascar.

== Uses ==
U. roeoesliana is used primarily as an ornamental plant.

== See also ==
- Uncarina grandidieri
