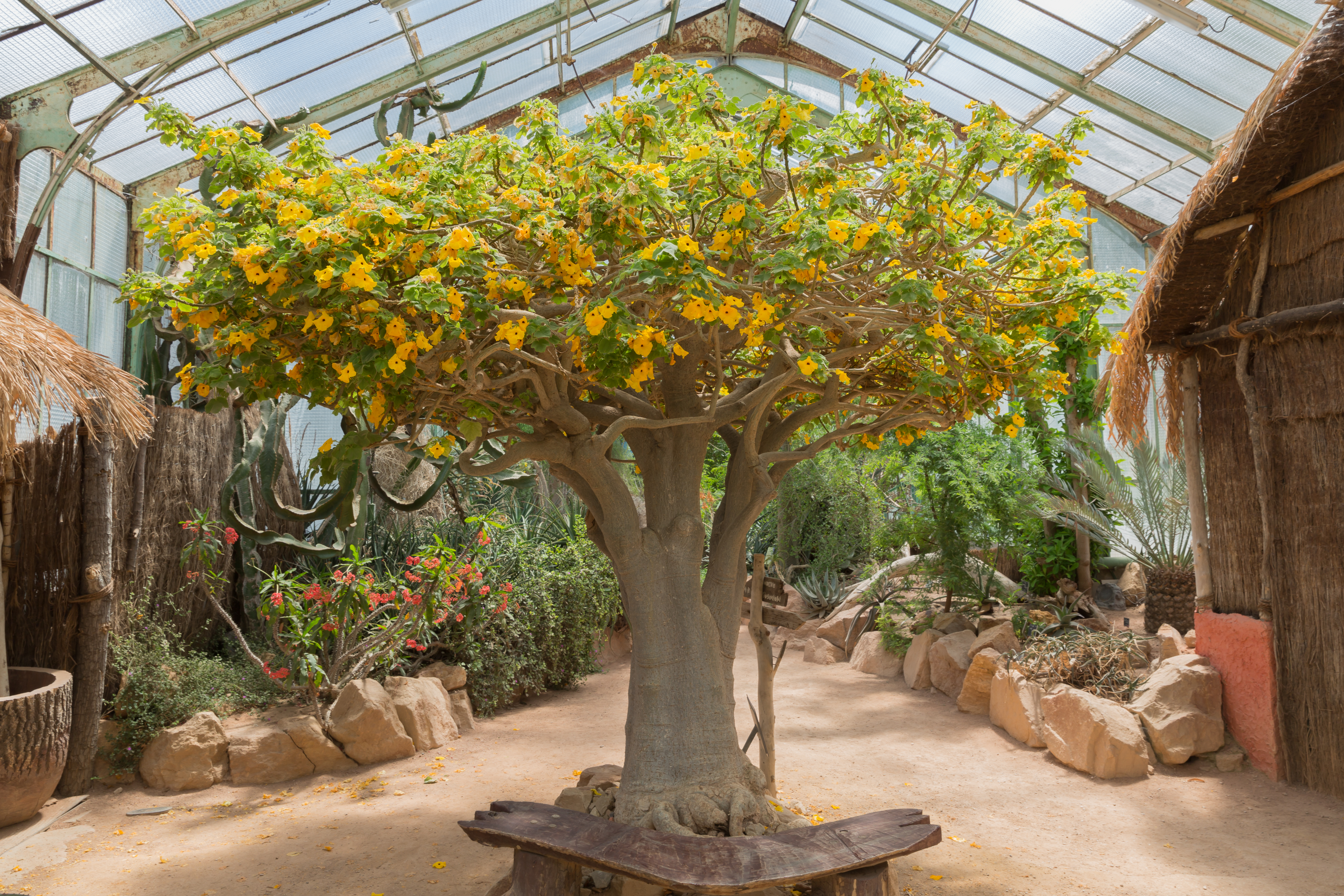

Scientific classification
- Kingdom: Plantae
- Clade: Tracheophytes
- Clade: Angiosperms
- Clade: Eudicots
- Clade: Asterids
- Order: Lamiales
- Family: Pedaliaceae
- Genus: Uncarina
- Species: U. grandidieri

Binomial name
- Uncarina grandidieri (Baill.) Stapf

= Uncarina grandidieri =

Succulent sesame

Species of plant

Uncarina grandidieri, also known as succulent sesame, mousetrap plant, mousetrap tree, farehitra, or farehitsy, is a species of semi-succulent, caudex-forming flowering plants native to South Madagascar. Named by Otto Stapf in 1895, it grows in desert or dry shrubland.

== Description ==
Unlike other Uncarina species, Uncarina grandidieri has smaller leaves with a ciliate texture. The leaves are palmate, hairy, and smaller. The flowers resemble Petunia and Thunbergia flowers and are yellow. Like other Uncarina species, the fruits have barbed hooks that are lethal if swallowed by animals.

== Uses ==
Uncarina grandidieri has been used as an ornamental plant because due to its flowers, which resembles Thunbergia and its caudex.

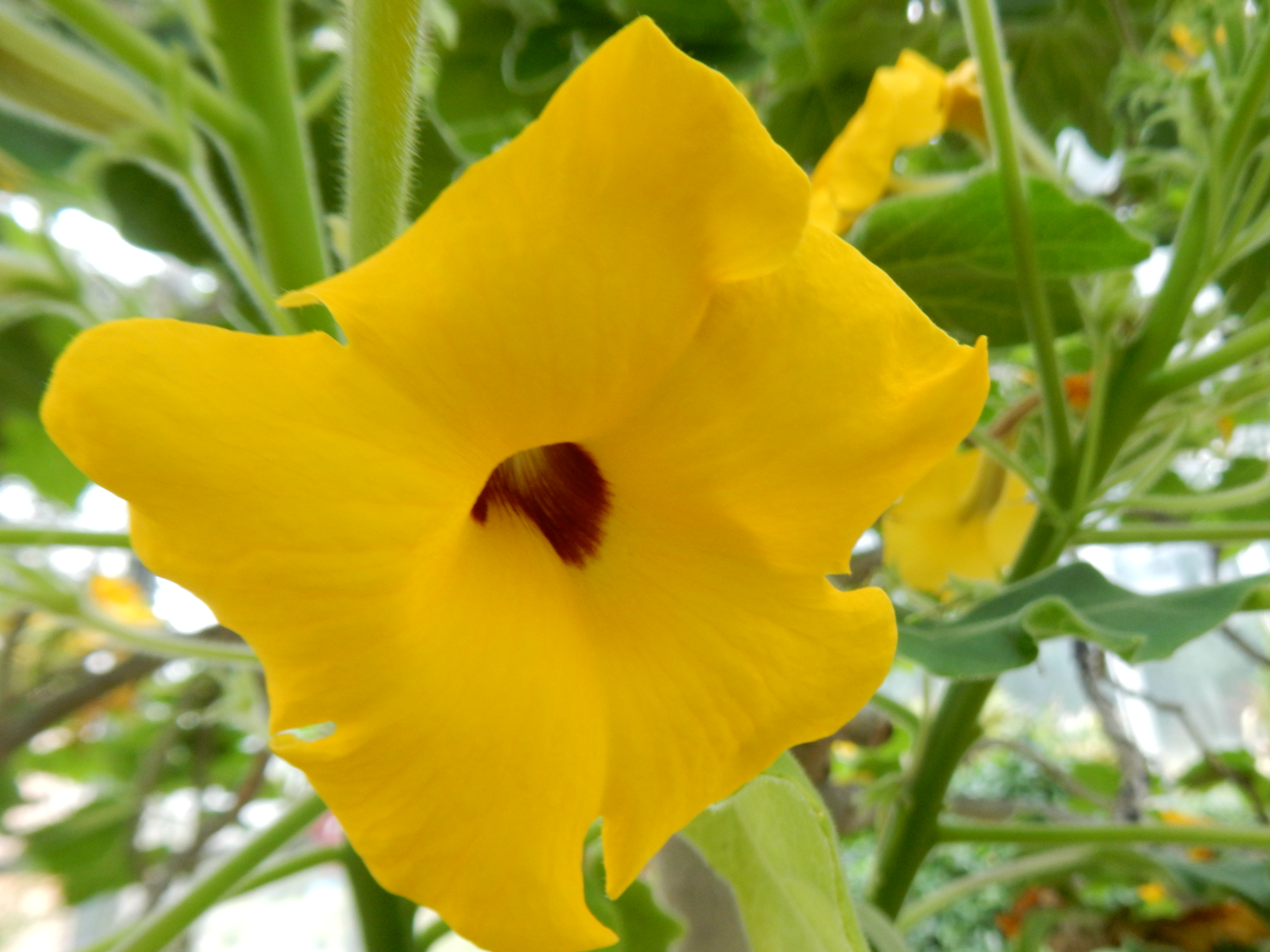
