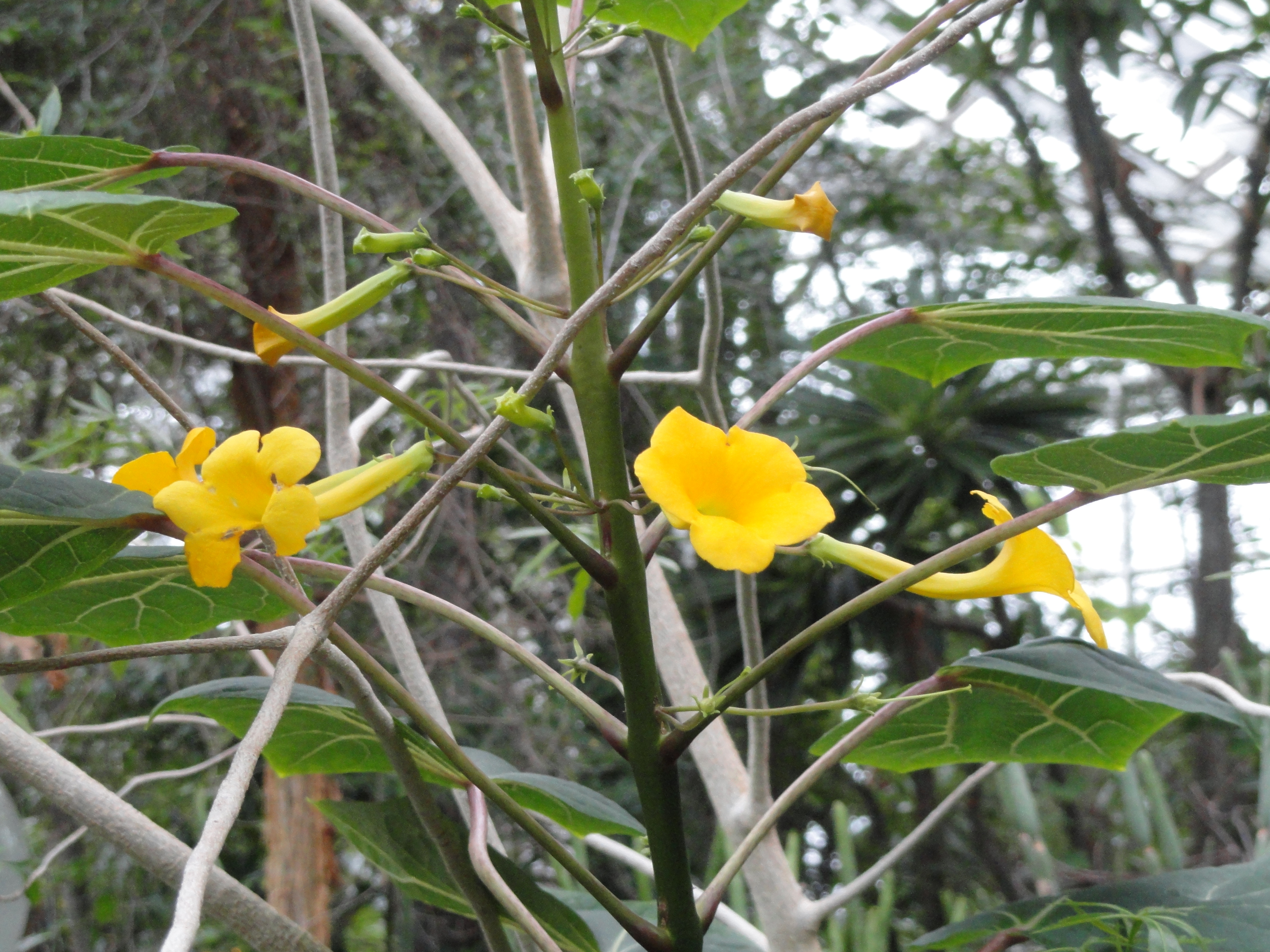
- Detail of the flower

Scientific classification
- Kingdom: Plantae
- Clade: Tracheophytes
- Clade: Angiosperms
- Clade: Eudicots
- Clade: Asterids
- Order: Lamiales
- Family: Pedaliaceae
- Genus: Uncarina
- Species: U. perrieri

Binomial name
- Uncarina perrieri Humbert

= Uncarina perrieri =

Species of plant

Uncarina perrieri, commonly known as succulent sesame, mouse trap plant, or Perrier's Uncarina, is a species of flowering plant, which is indigenous to Madagascar.

It was first described by French botanist, Jean-Henri Humbert, in 1962.
