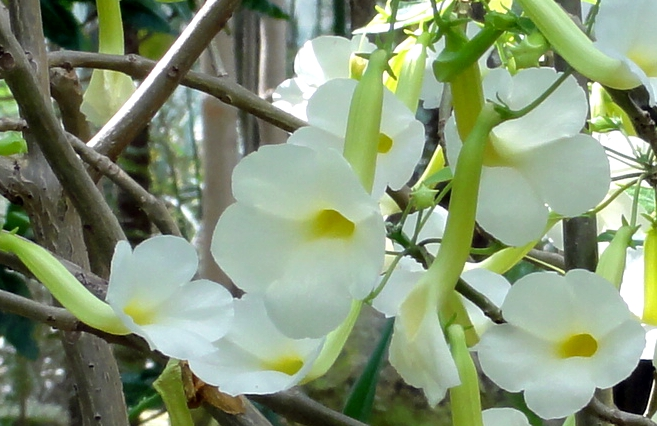
- Uncarina leptocarpa at the Palmengarten Frankfurt

Scientific classification
- Kingdom: Plantae
- Clade: Tracheophytes
- Clade: Angiosperms
- Clade: Eudicots
- Clade: Asterids
- Order: Lamiales
- Family: Pedaliaceae
- Genus: Uncarina
- Species: U. leptocarpa

Binomial name
- Uncarina leptocarpa (Decne.) Ihlenf. & Straka

= Uncarina leptocarpa =

Species of plant

Uncarina leptocarpa is a sesame relative native to Madagascar. Like other Uncarina species, it has been found in the spiny thickets.

== Gallery ==
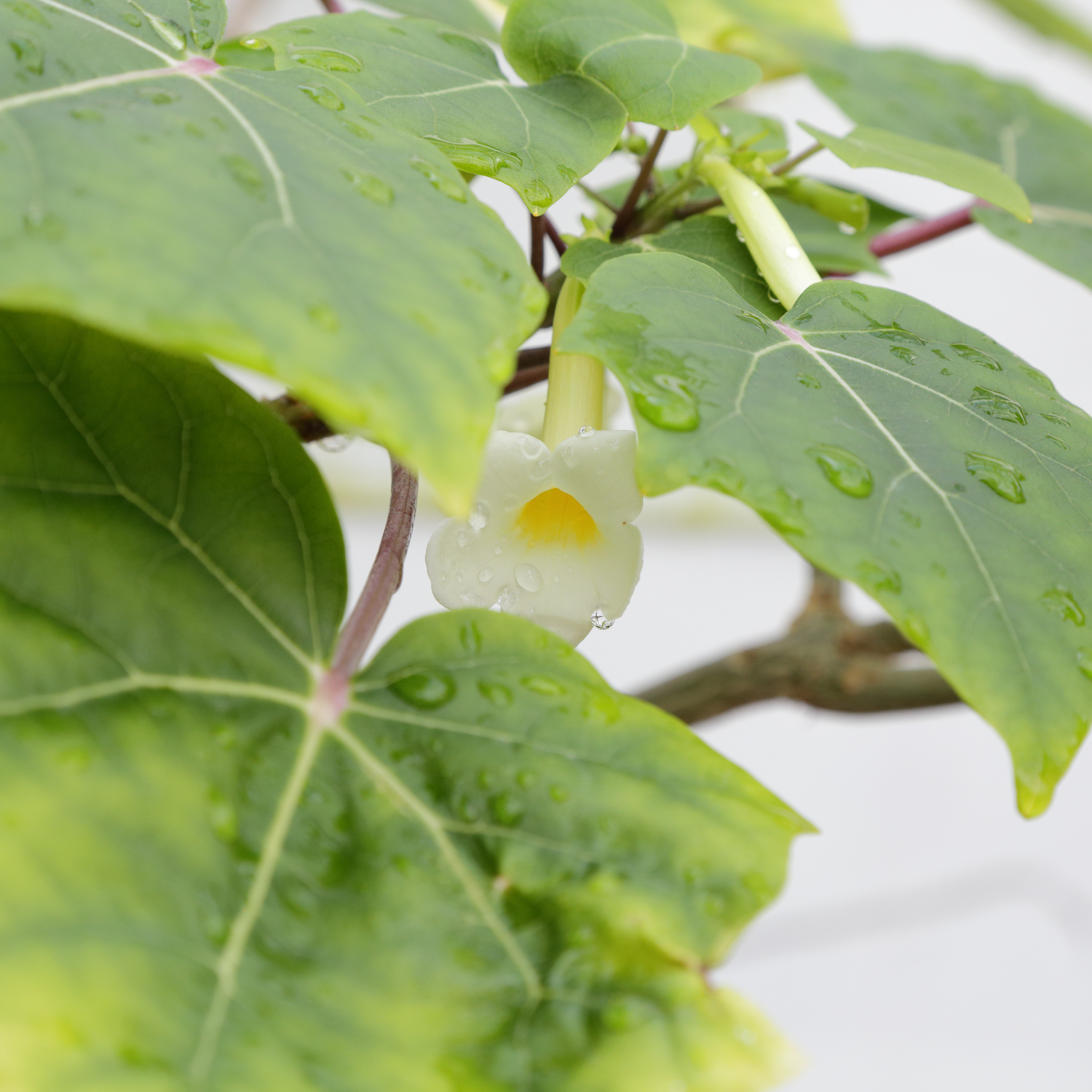

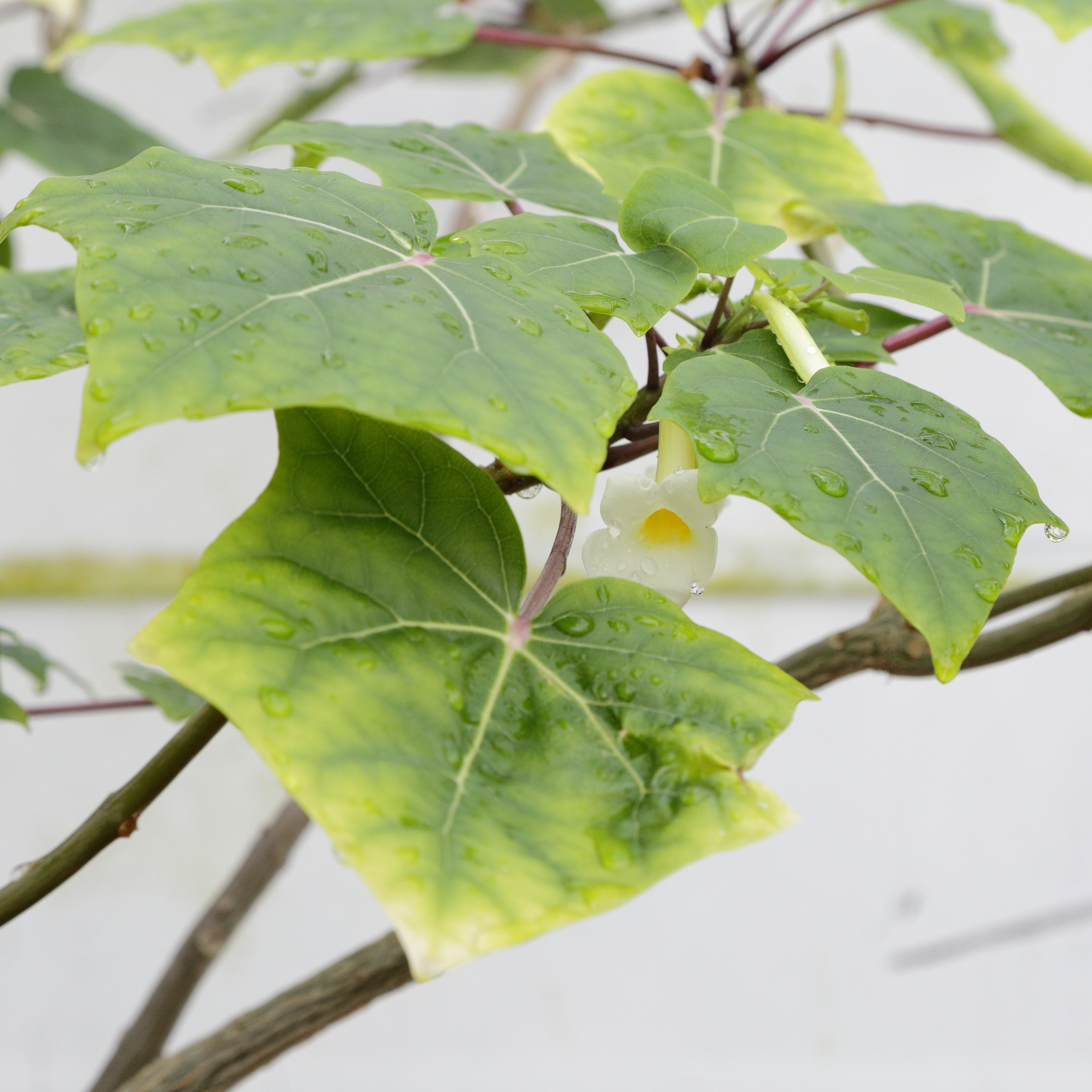
