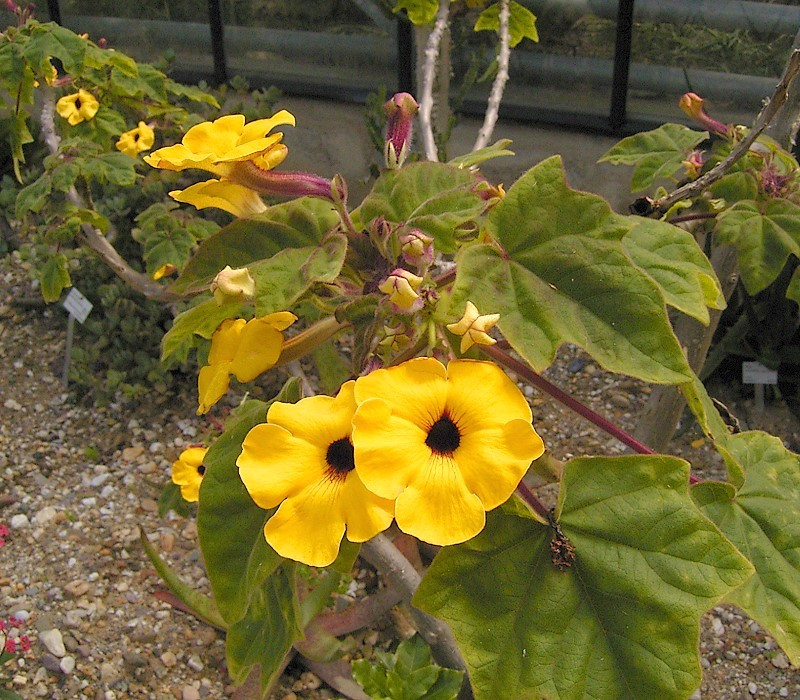

Scientific classification
- Kingdom: Plantae
- Clade: Tracheophytes
- Clade: Angiosperms
- Clade: Eudicots
- Clade: Asterids
- Order: Lamiales
- Family: Pedaliaceae
- Genus: Uncarina
- Species: U. decaryi

Binomial name
- Uncarina decaryi Humbert ex Ihlenf.

= Uncarina decaryi =

Species of succulent

Uncarina decaryi, also called succulent sesame, mouse trap plant, Decary's Uncarina, or Uncarina, is a species of succulent tree native to Madagascar.

== Description ==
Uncarina decaryi had leaves that are lobed, usually bearing up to 7 points, and they have a red petiole and the leaf is cillate in texture.

== Distribution and habitat ==
Like other members in the genus Uncarina, Uncarina decaryi lives in the spiny thickets.

== Gallery ==
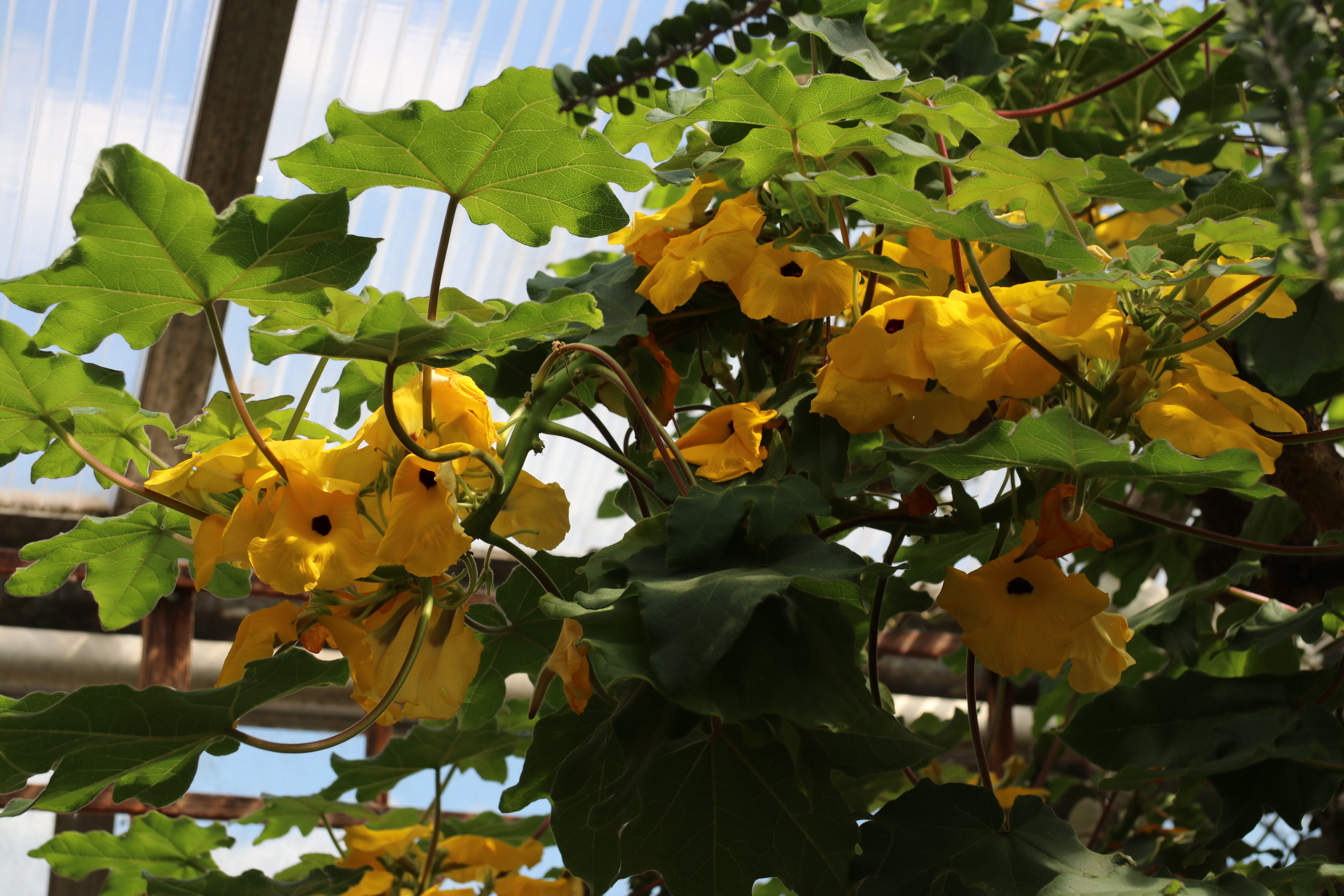

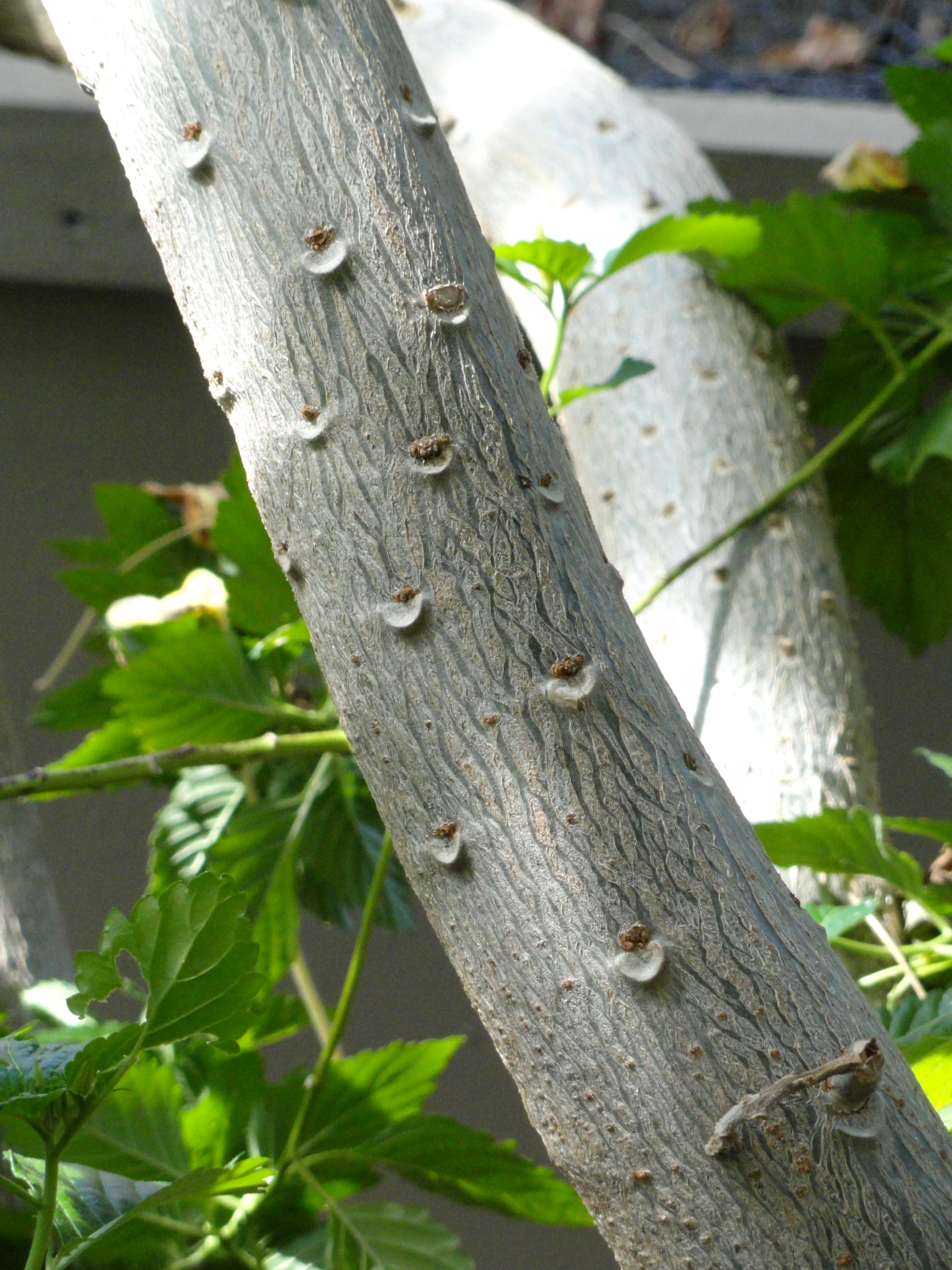

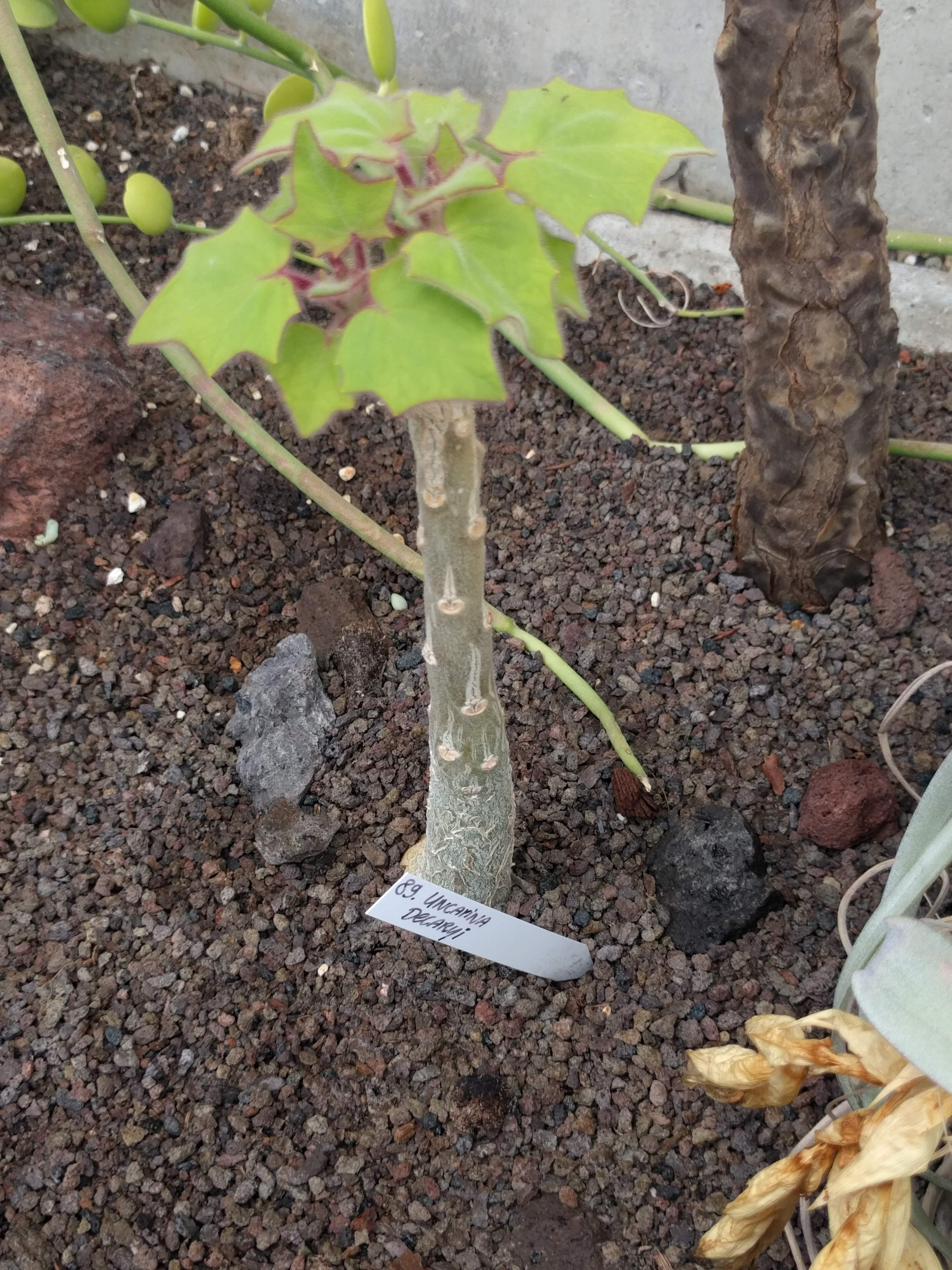

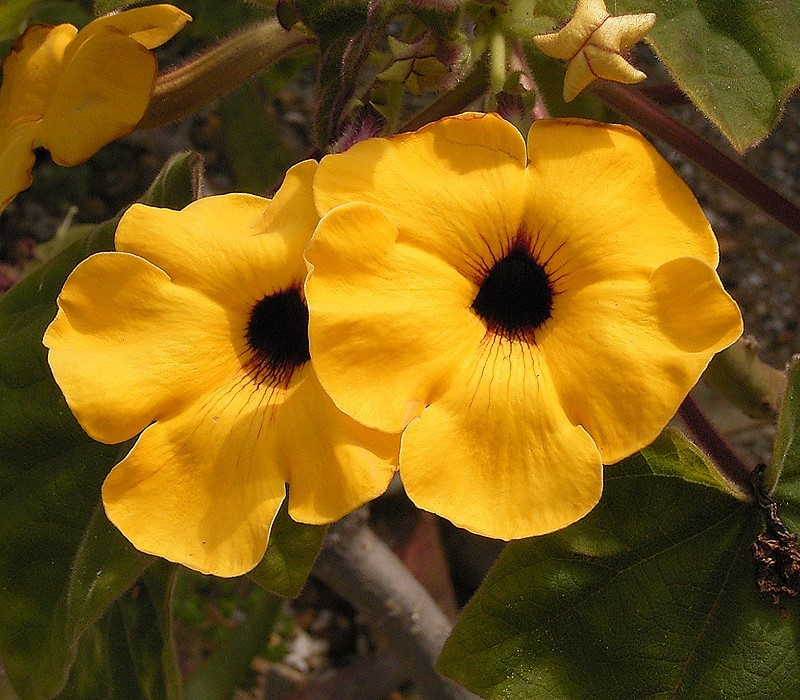

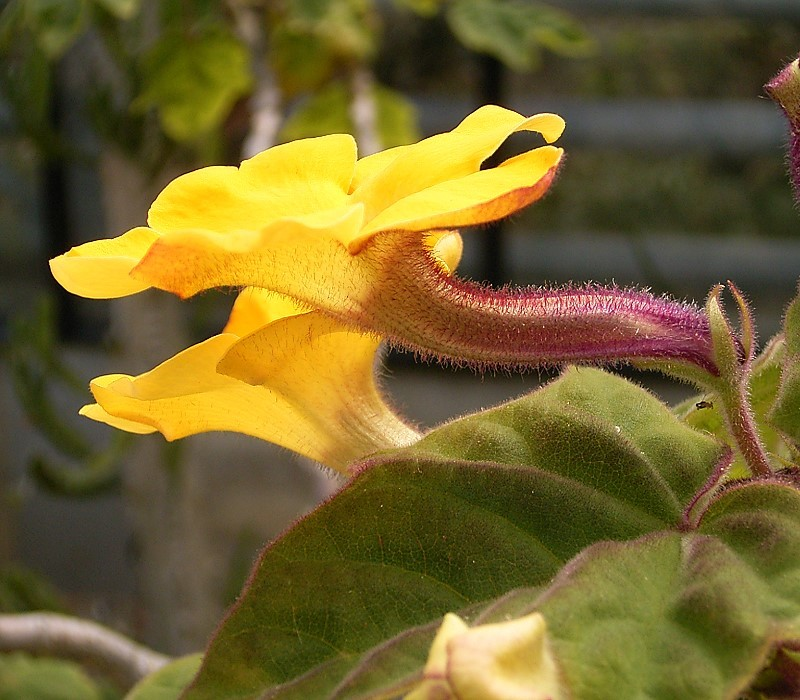

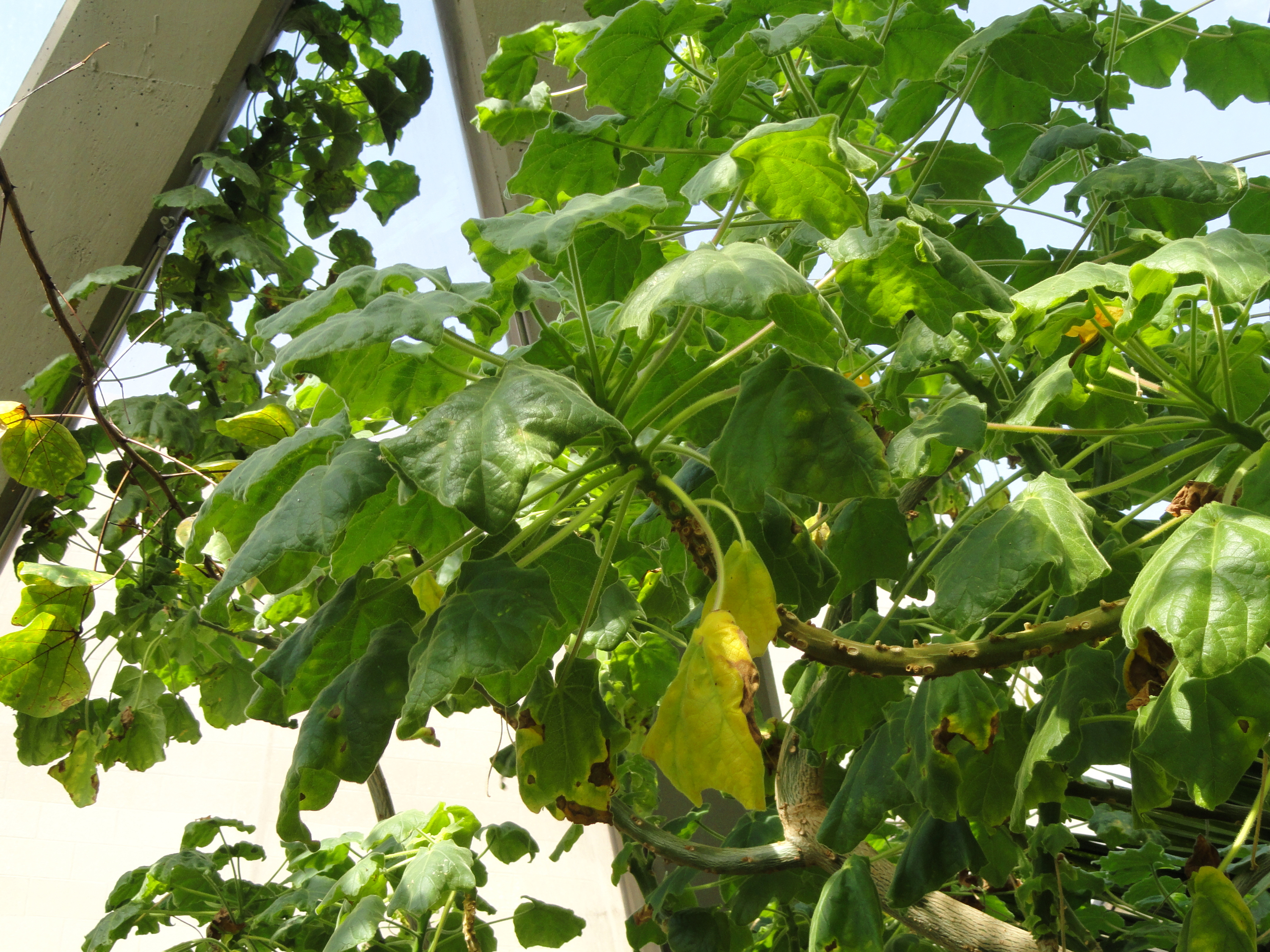

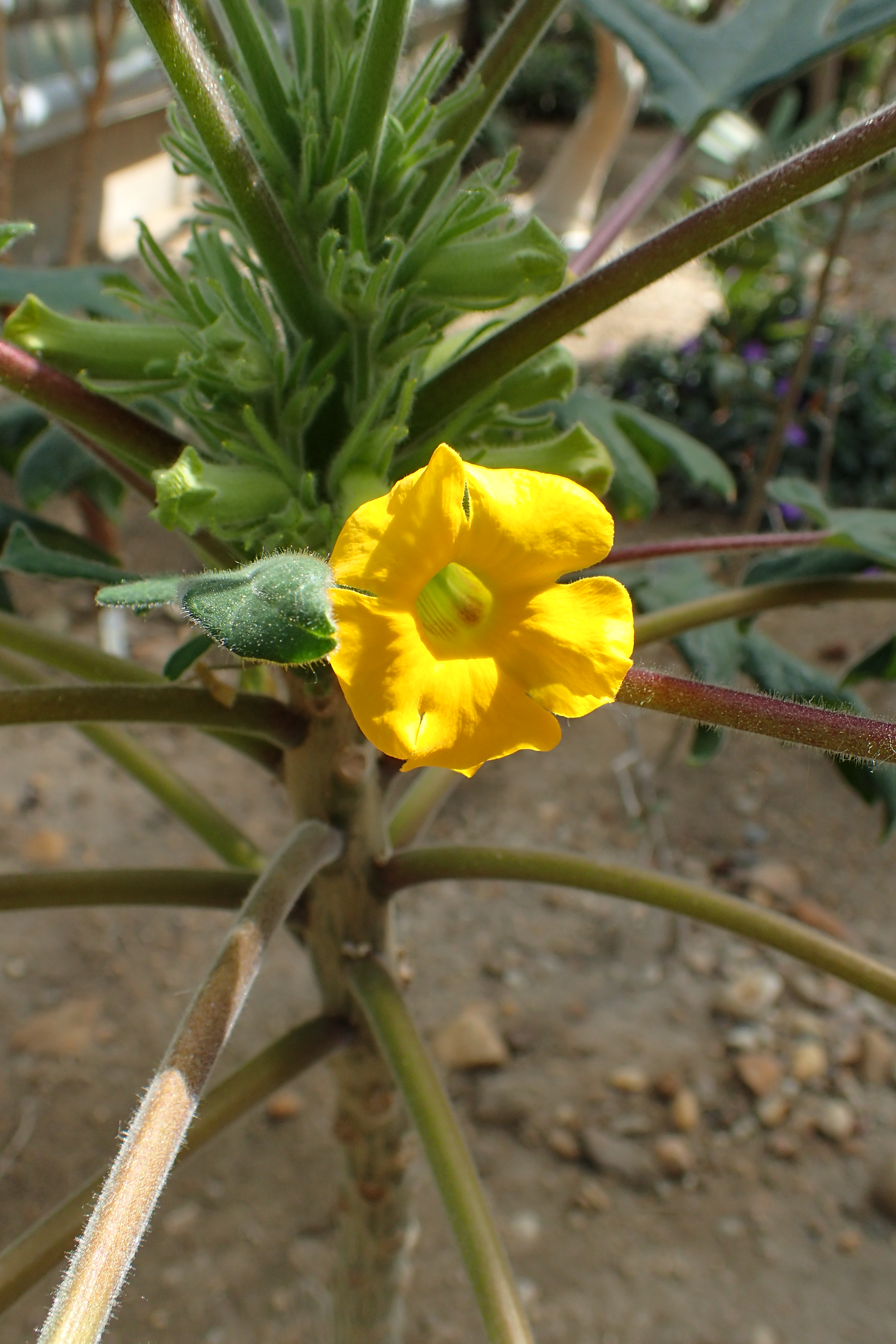

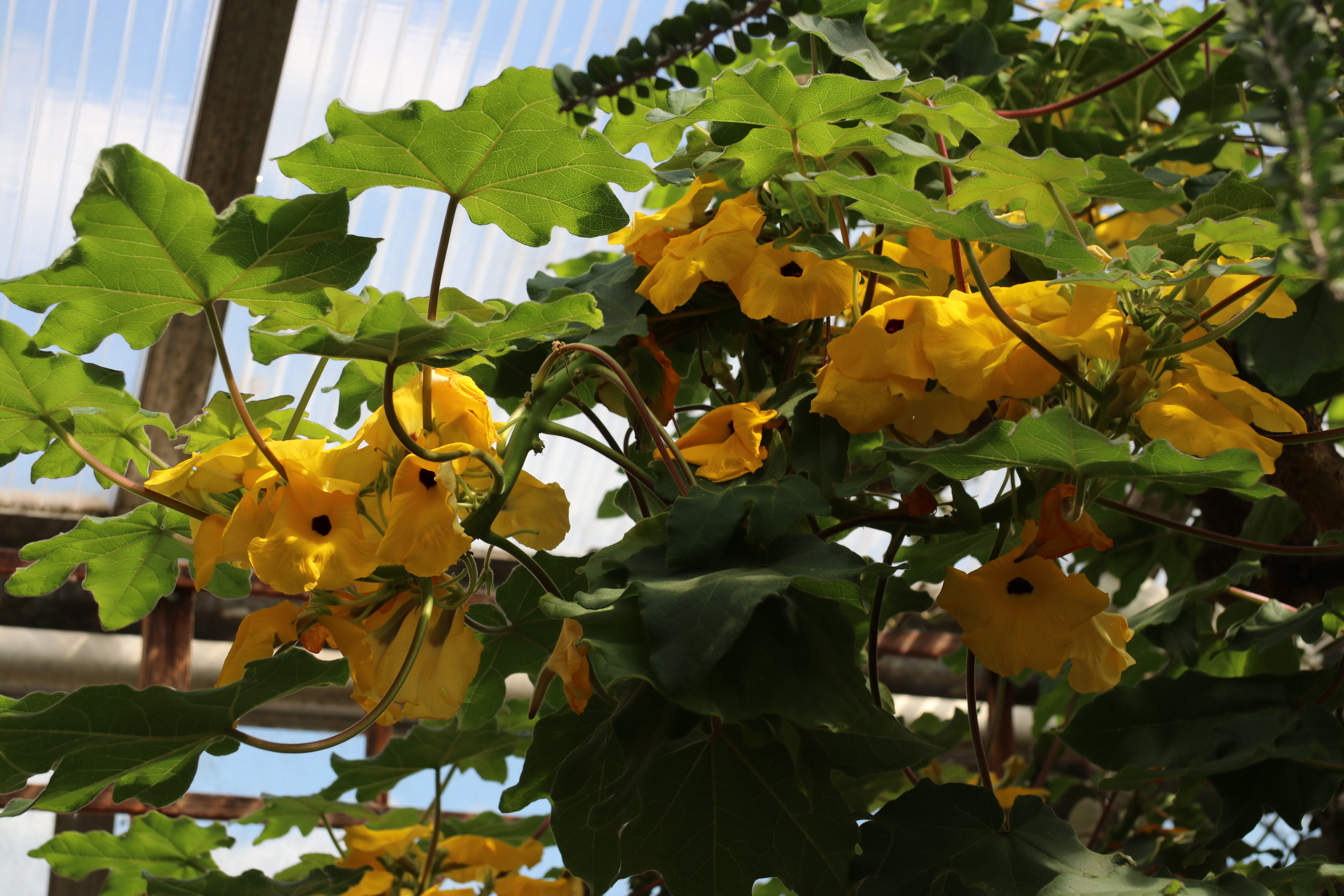
