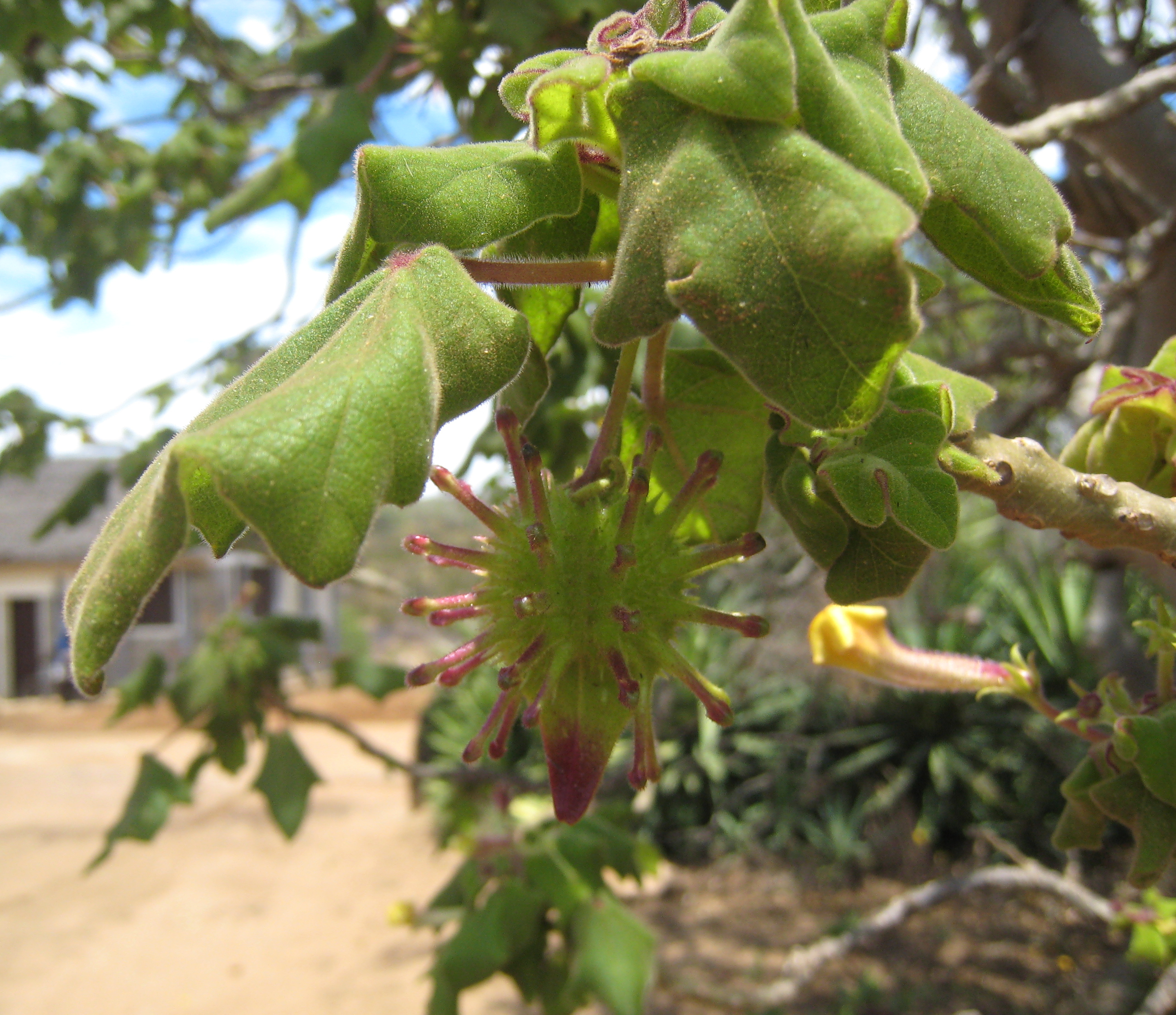

Scientific classification
- Kingdom: Plantae
- Clade: Embryophytes
- Clade: Tracheophytes
- Clade: Spermatophytes
- Clade: Angiosperms
- Clade: Eudicots
- Clade: Asterids
- Order: Lamiales
- Family: Pedaliaceae
- Genus: Uncarina; Stapf

Species
- See text

= Uncarina =

Genus of flowering plants

Uncarina, also called succulent sesame, mousetrap plant, or local names include farehitra or farehitsy, is a genus of semi-succulent flowering plants in the Pedaliaceae (the sesame family) found in Madagascar. As most species within the genus are inhabitants of dry, semi-arid or seasonally-dry regions, many mature into water-storing pachycauls, or "caudiciformes"—a common colloquial term to describe plants that normally inhabit drier climates and develop a large, woody base, or "foot", known as a caudex. In these species, a plant's lower half gradually accumulates and stores water (similarly to a camel's hump); over time, the caudex changes shape, swelling to an often impressive size, as it adds to its own moisture "reservoir" for future periods of drought.

== Etymology ==
The genera name is derived from the Greek word unca meaning hook.

== Species ==
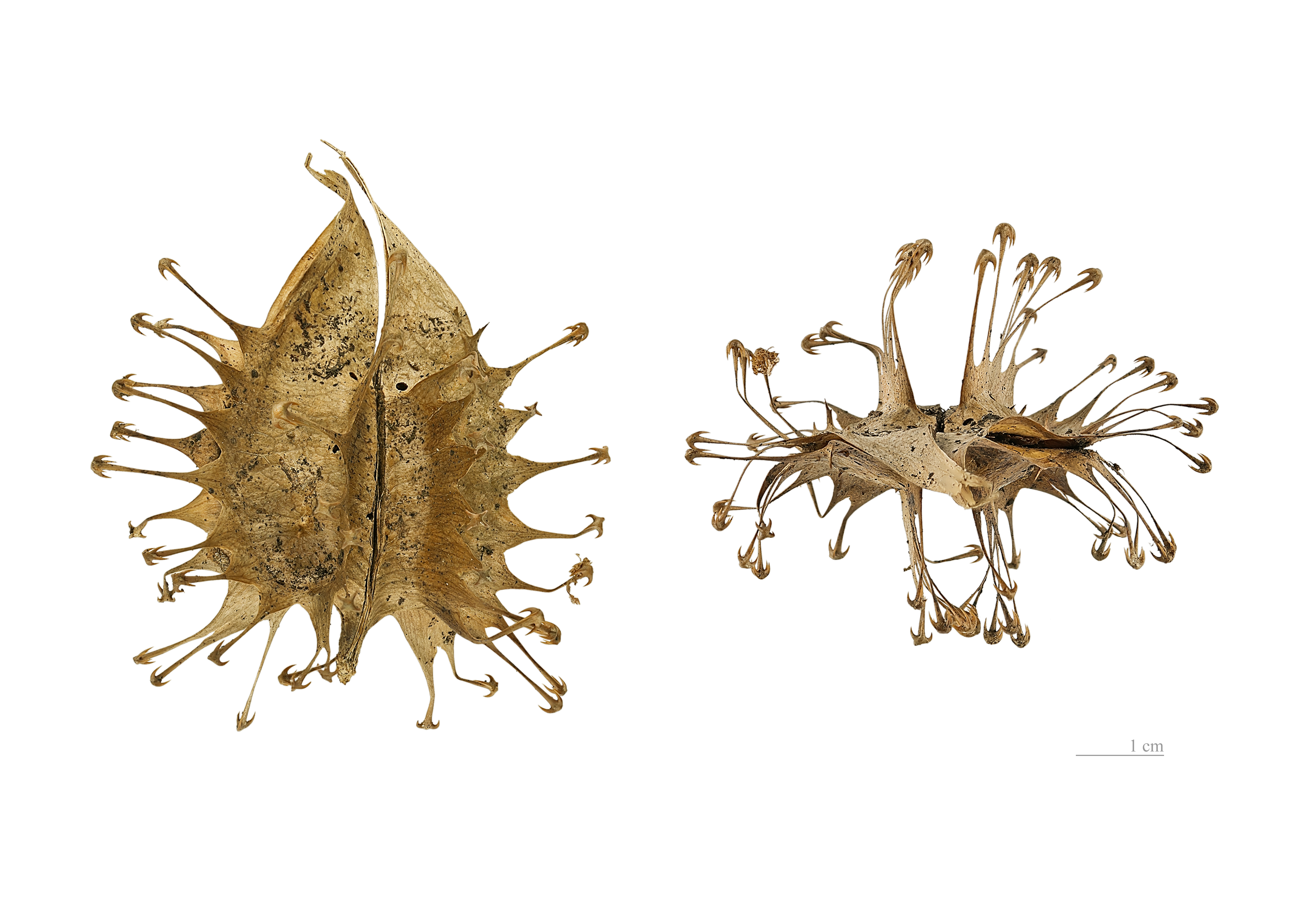
Uncarina ankaranensis

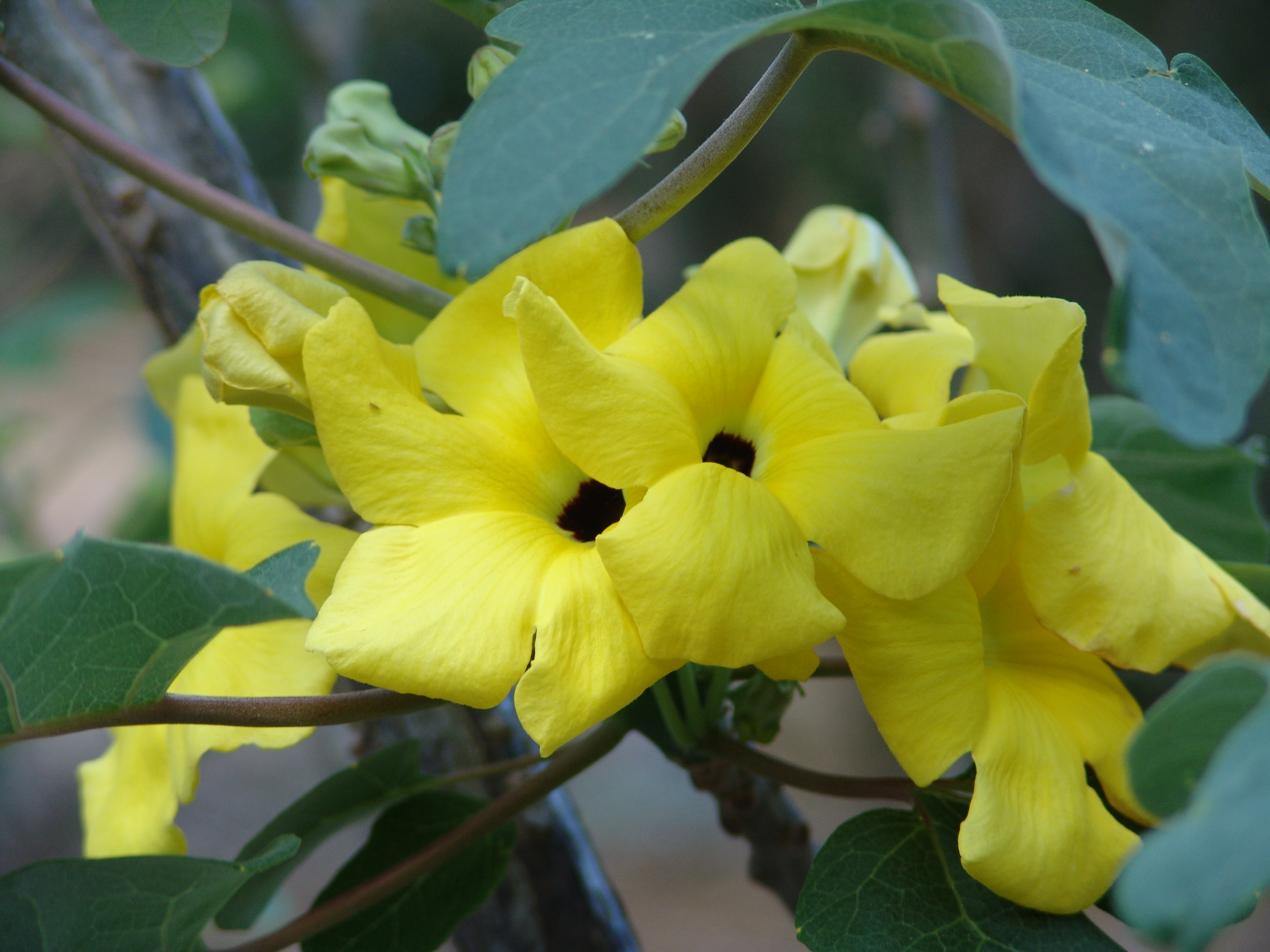
Uncarina peltata

Species include:

Image	Scientific name	Distribution
	Uncarina abbreviata (Baill.) Ihlenf. & Straka	Madagascar
	Uncarina decaryi Humbert ex Ihlenf.	Madagascar
	Uncarina grandidieri (Baill.) Stapf	Madagascar
	Uncarina ihlenfeldtiana Lavranos	Madagascar
	Uncarina leandrii Humbert	Madagascar
	Uncarina leptocarpa (Decne.) Ihlenf. & Straka	Madagascar
	Uncarina peltata (Baker) Stapf	Madagascar
	Uncarina perrieri Humbert	Madagascar
	Uncarina roeoesliana Rauh	Madagascar
	Uncarina sakalava Humbert	Madagascar
	Uncarina stellulifera Humbert	Madagascar
	Uncarina turicana Lavranos	Madagascar
