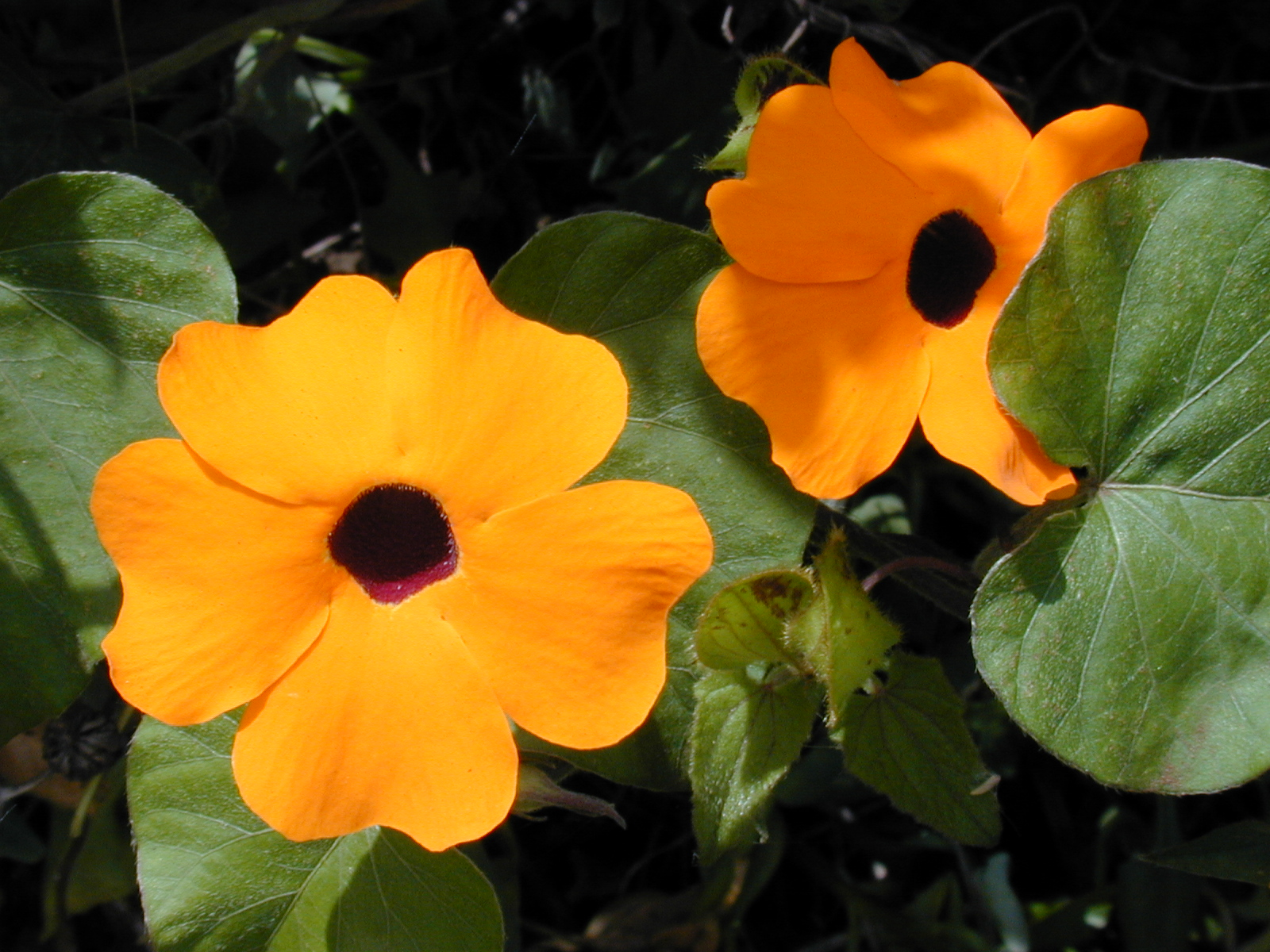

Scientific classification
- Kingdom: Plantae
- Clade: Embryophytes
- Clade: Tracheophytes
- Clade: Angiosperms
- Clade: Eudicots
- Clade: Asterids
- Order: Lamiales
- Family: Acanthaceae
- Genus: Thunbergia
- Species: T. alata

Binomial name
- Thunbergia alata Bojer ex Sims

Synonyms
- List: *Endomelas alata (Bojer ex Sims) Raf.; *Thunbergia albiflora Gordon; *Thunbergia aurantiaca Paxton; *Thunbergia bikimaensis De Wild.; *Thunbergia delamerei S.Moore; *Thunbergia doddsii Paxton; *Thunbergia fuscata T.Anderson ex Lindau; *Thunbergia kamatembica Mildbr.; *Thunbergia manganjensis Lindau; *Thunbergia nymphaeifolia Lindau; *Thunbergia oculata S.Moore; *Valentiana volubilis Raf.

= Thunbergia alata =

Black-eyed Susan vine

Species of plant

Thunbergia alata, commonly called black-eyed Susan vine, is a herbaceous perennial climbing plant species in the family Acanthaceae. It is native to Eastern Africa, and has been naturalized in other parts of the world.

It is grown as an ornamental plant in gardens and in hanging baskets. The name 'Black-eyed Susan' is thought to have come from a character that figures in many traditional ballads and songs. In the Ballad of Black-eyed Susan by John Gay, Susan goes aboard a ship in-dock to ask the sailors where her lover Sweet William has gone. Black-eyed Susan is also a name given to other species of flowers in the genus Rudbeckia.

== Description ==
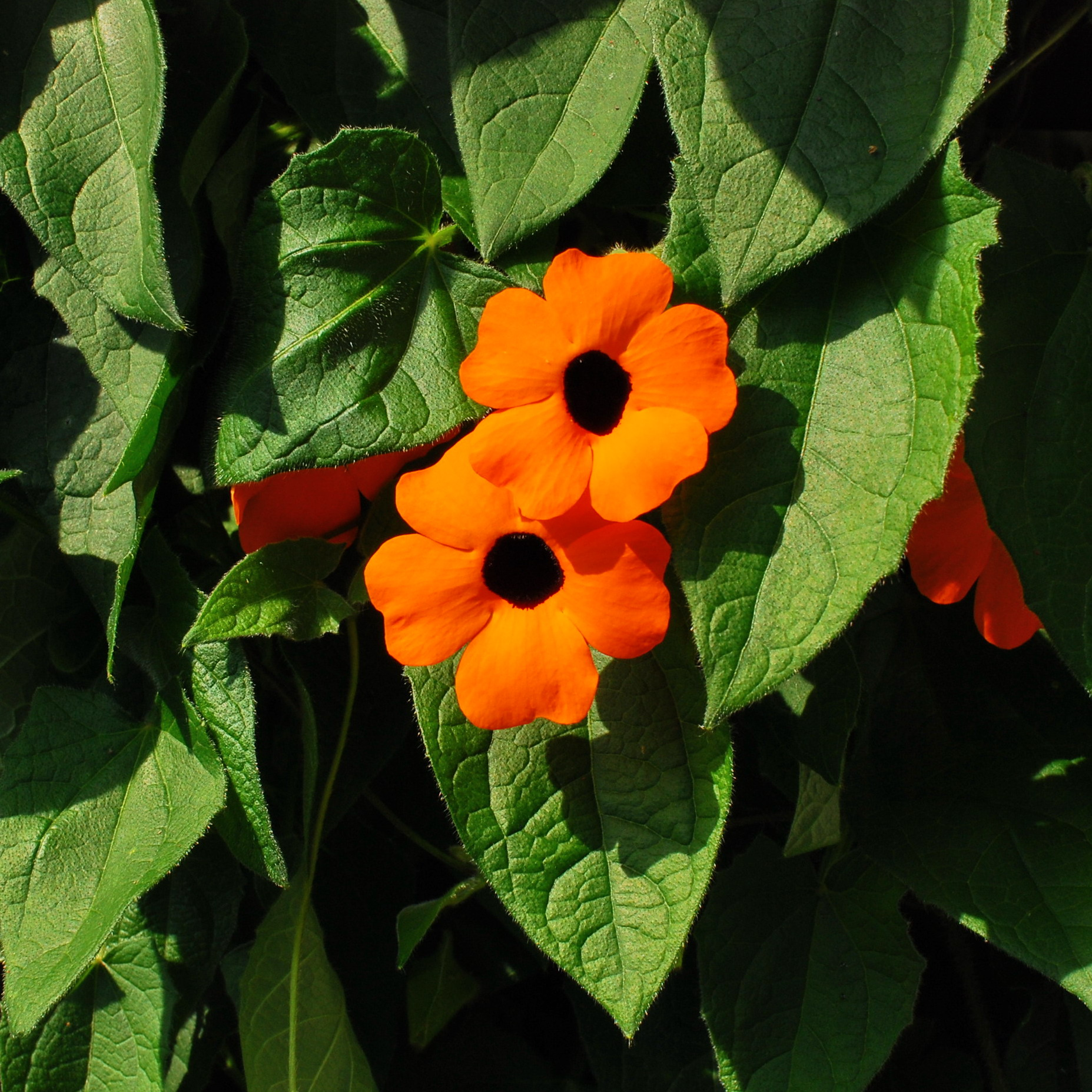
Flowers

Thunbergia alata has a vine habit, and can grow to a height of 5 metres (16 ft) high in warmer zones, or much less as a container plant or as an annual. It has twining stems with heart or arrow-shaped leaves. The three and a half to seven and a half centimeters long and two and a half centimeters wide leaves are triangular to heart-shaped. Their edges are wavy and both surfaces are hairy. The leaf blades sit on up to six and a half centimeters long petioles, which attach at a distance of four and a half to 13 centimeters on the one to one and a quarter millimeter thick stem axis.

=== Inflorescence ===
The hairy, mostly orange-yellow flowers have five petals and appear throughout the growing season, which grow on up to eight and a half centimeters long inflorescence axes. They typically are warm orange with a characteristic dark spot in the centre. The central two centimeter long corolla tube is black-violet. Each of the single flowers has two triangular to oval, hairy bracts that taper towards the outside. They are 18 to 20 millimeters long and nine to ten millimeters wide. The serrated calyx is about two millimeters long and has between 15 and 17 awl-shaped lobes. The corolla tube measures around four centimeters and shows five two centimeter large corolla lobes with right-hand covering buds on the outside.

The plant flowers from mid-summer to the first frost, but it will flower all year round in milder, frostless climate zones.

The 16 to 18 millimeter long fruits are finely hairy. At the base they have a diameter of seven millimeters. The four seeds measure 3.5 millimeters.

== Cultivation ==
Thunbergia alata seed is easy to germinate in humus-rich soil with some sand and it can be grown from cuttings. Soaking the seeds in a dish of warm water over night will help improve seed germination when planted. It is a fast grower, blooming quickly, with light trimming encouraging more blossoms. There are cultivars with red, orange, red-orange, white, pale yellow, or bright yellow flowers, with or without the characteristic chocolate-purple centre which inspires the common name.

== Distribution ==
The plant is originally from East Africa, and has almost a world distribution including tropical and subtropical areas like China, eastern Australia, Hawaii, Southern US in the states of Texas and Florida, Colombia, Puerto Rico, Mexico, South Africa, Portugal, Japan, New Zealand, Cerrado vegetation of Brazil, Argentina, Madagascar, India, Thailand and Philippines, among others.

It is used all around the world as a garden plant, but has managed to "escape" to the wilderness, naturalizing in tropical and temperate forests. It has been widely reported as Invasive species, especially in the Caribbean and Pacific islands, from Mexico to Colombia, and in Japan, due to the fast growing of the plant; the ease of wild pollination during sporadic flowering times; its vine-growing strategies that strangle or create shadow on other plants; its difficulty to eradicate by hand (as it leaves underground rhizomes that rapidly grow back); its lack of usual predators in non native regions; plus, people who are unaware of its harmful nature to other plants in the wilderness tend to admire its beauty and might opt not to remove it.

== Gallery ==
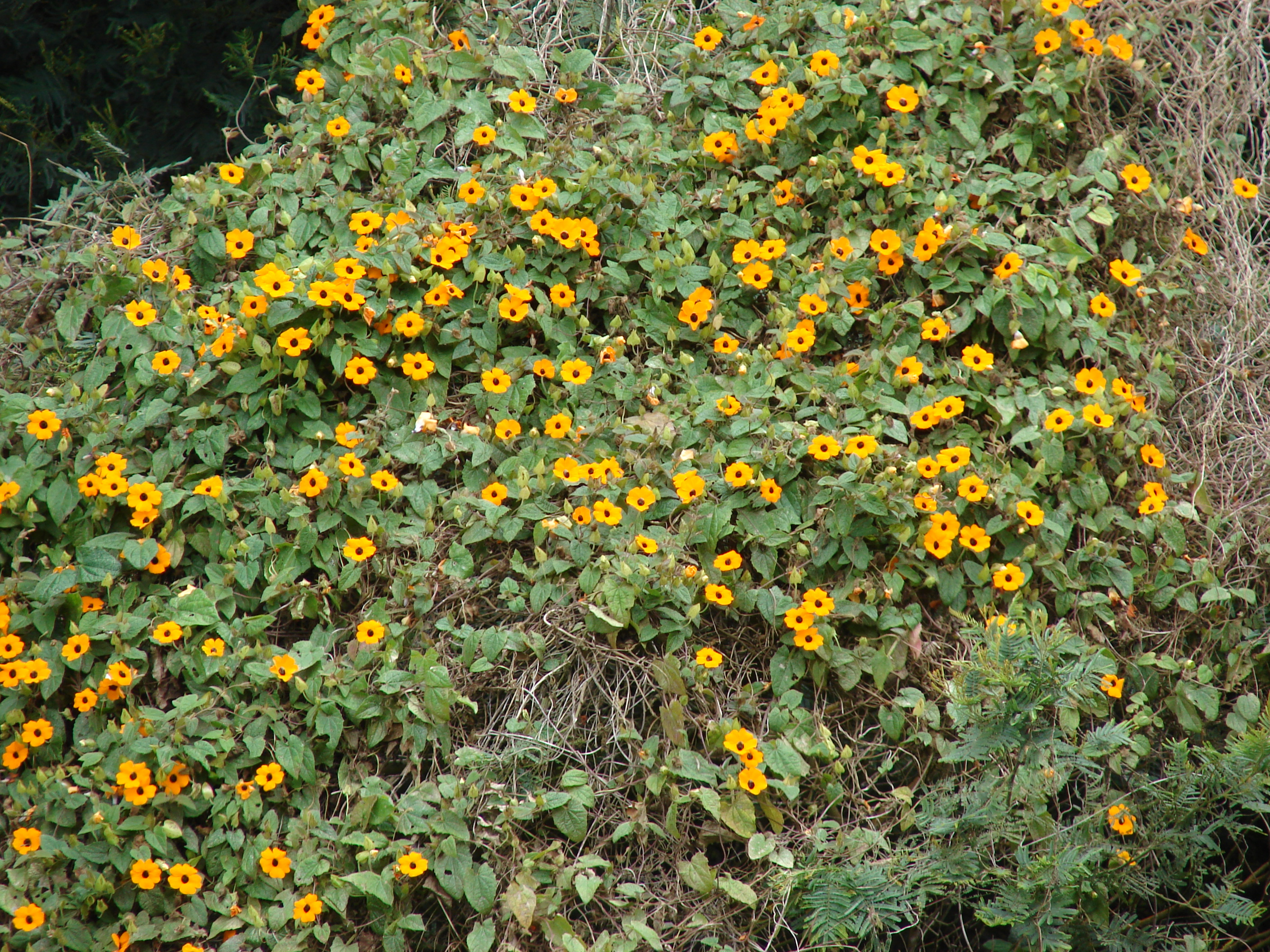
Flowers and leaves

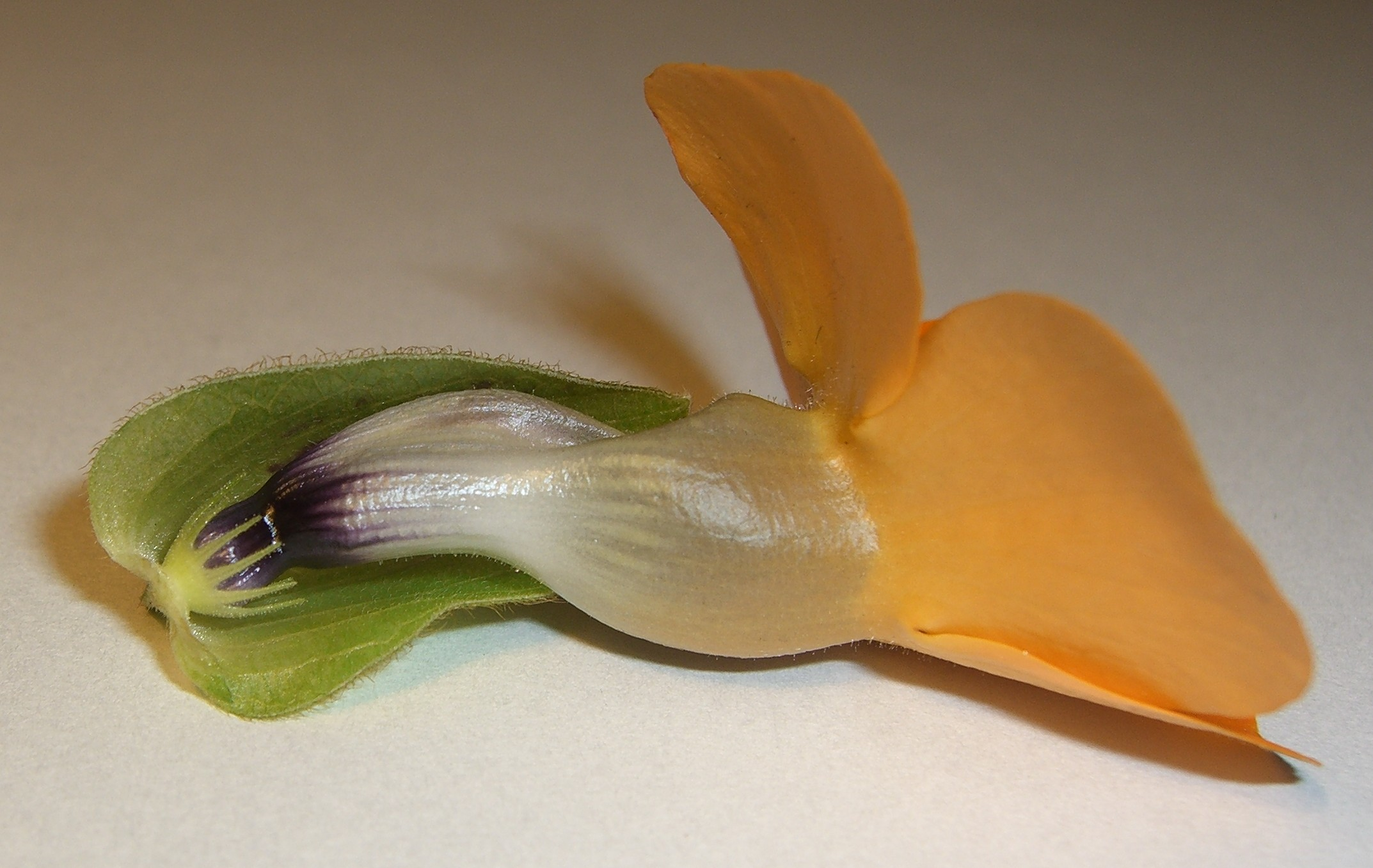
Flower (one of the two bracts removed)

A young plant being trained to grow on a trellis feeder wire

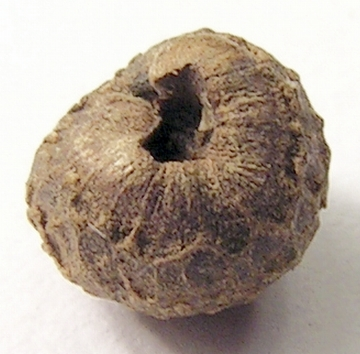
Seed - diameter is appr. 4 mm.

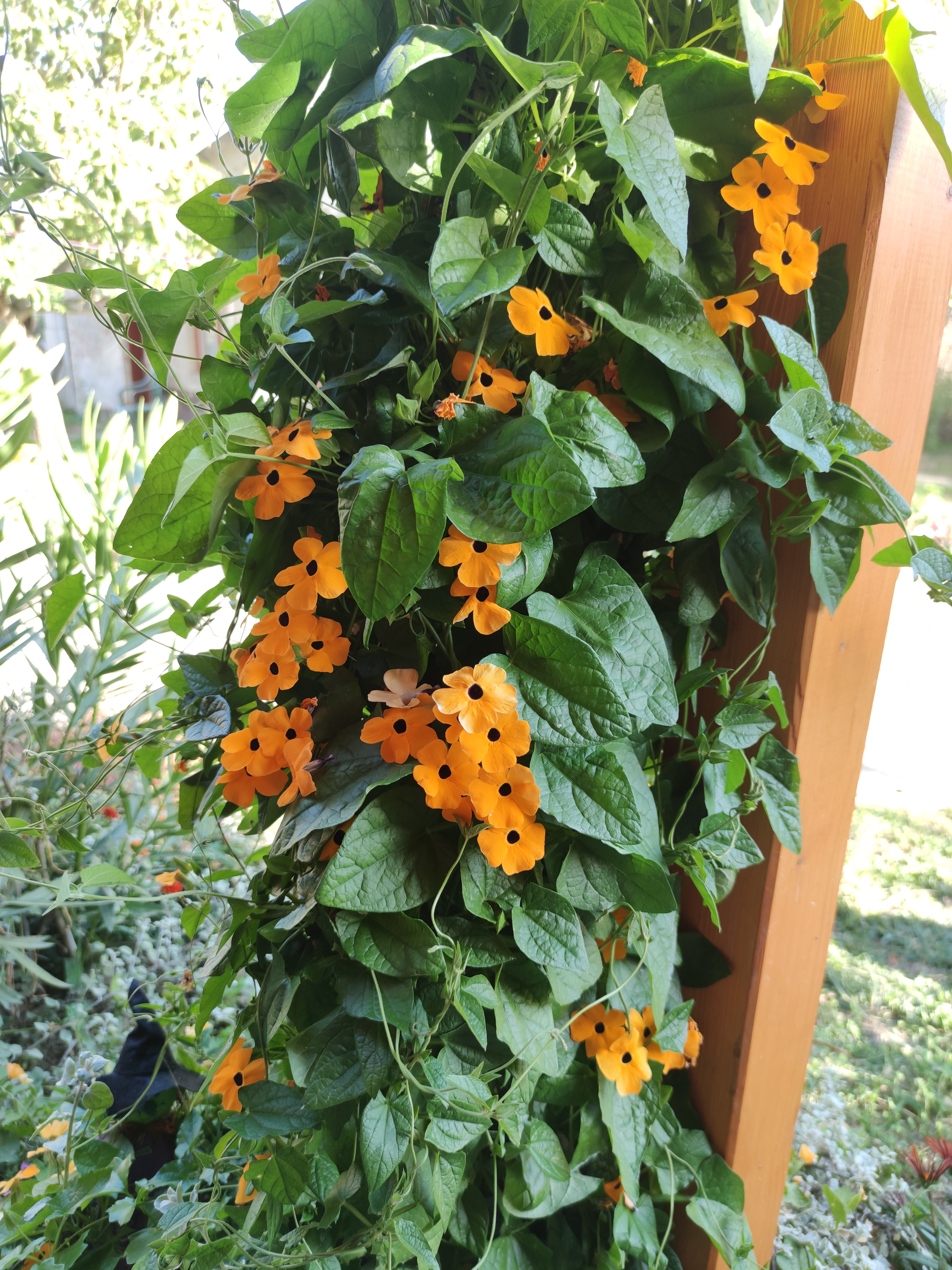
As a porch plant

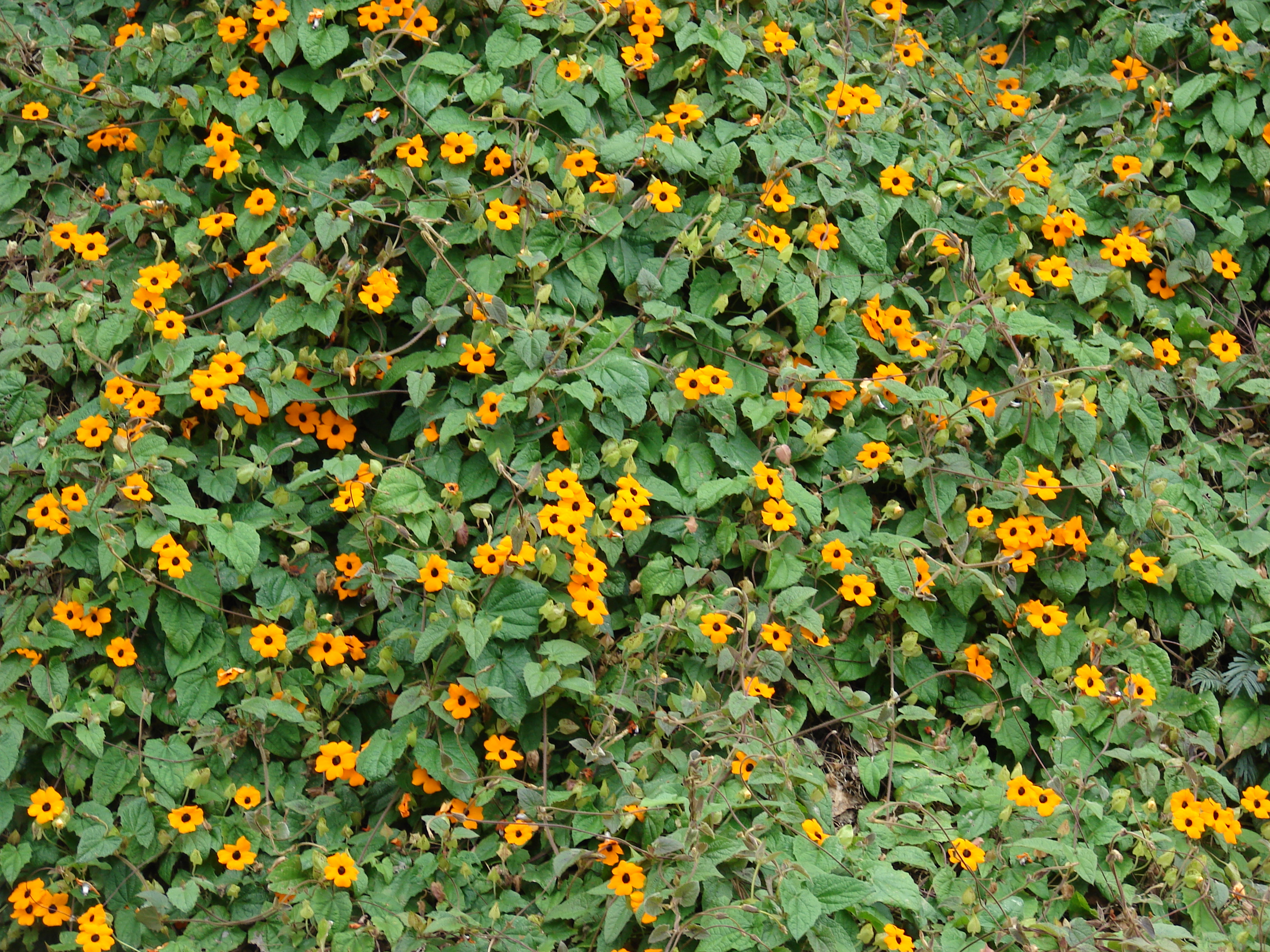
Vigorous growth

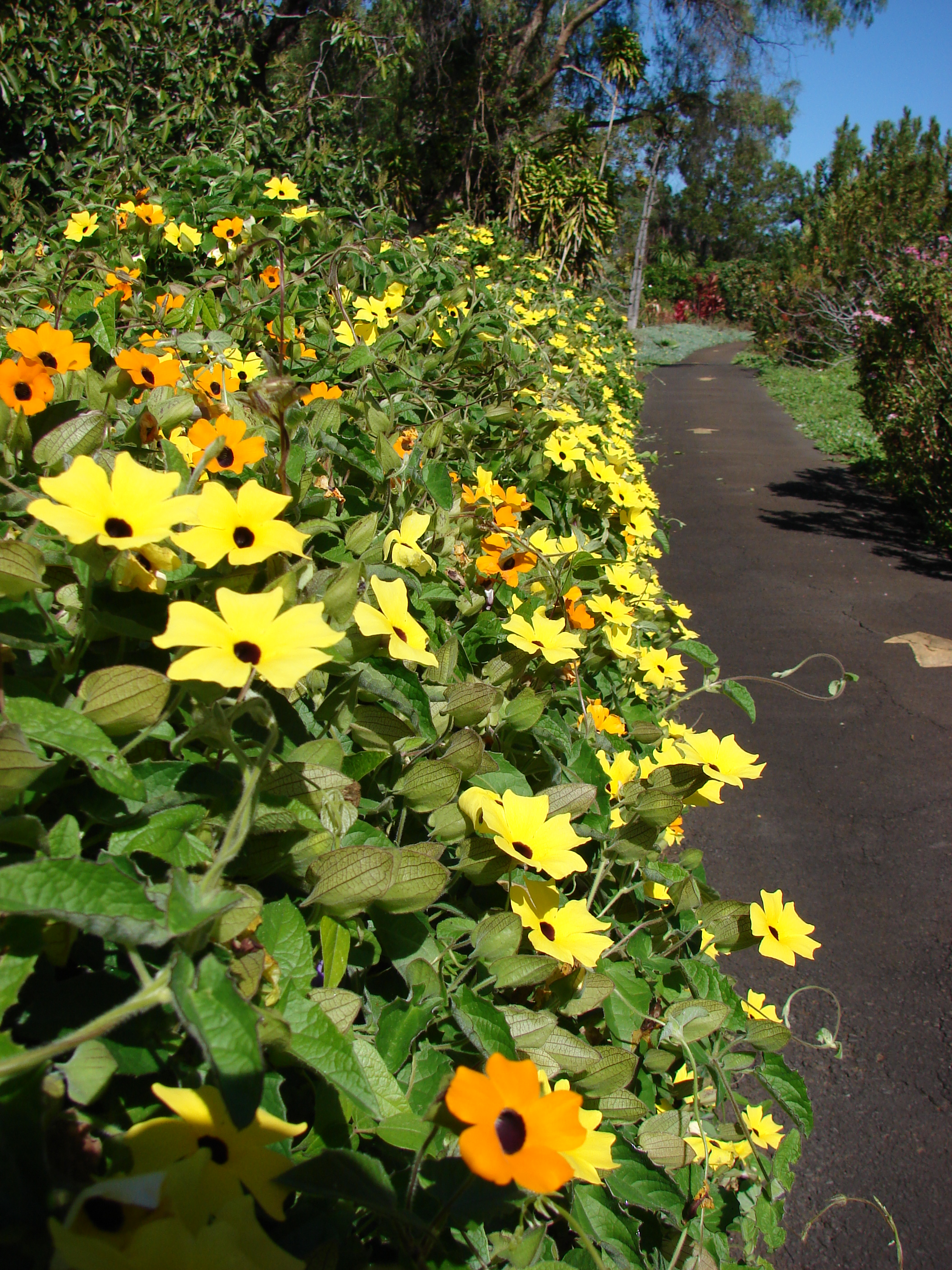
Maui, Enchanting Floral Gardens of Kula
