= Plant stress measurement =

CO2-1PPM

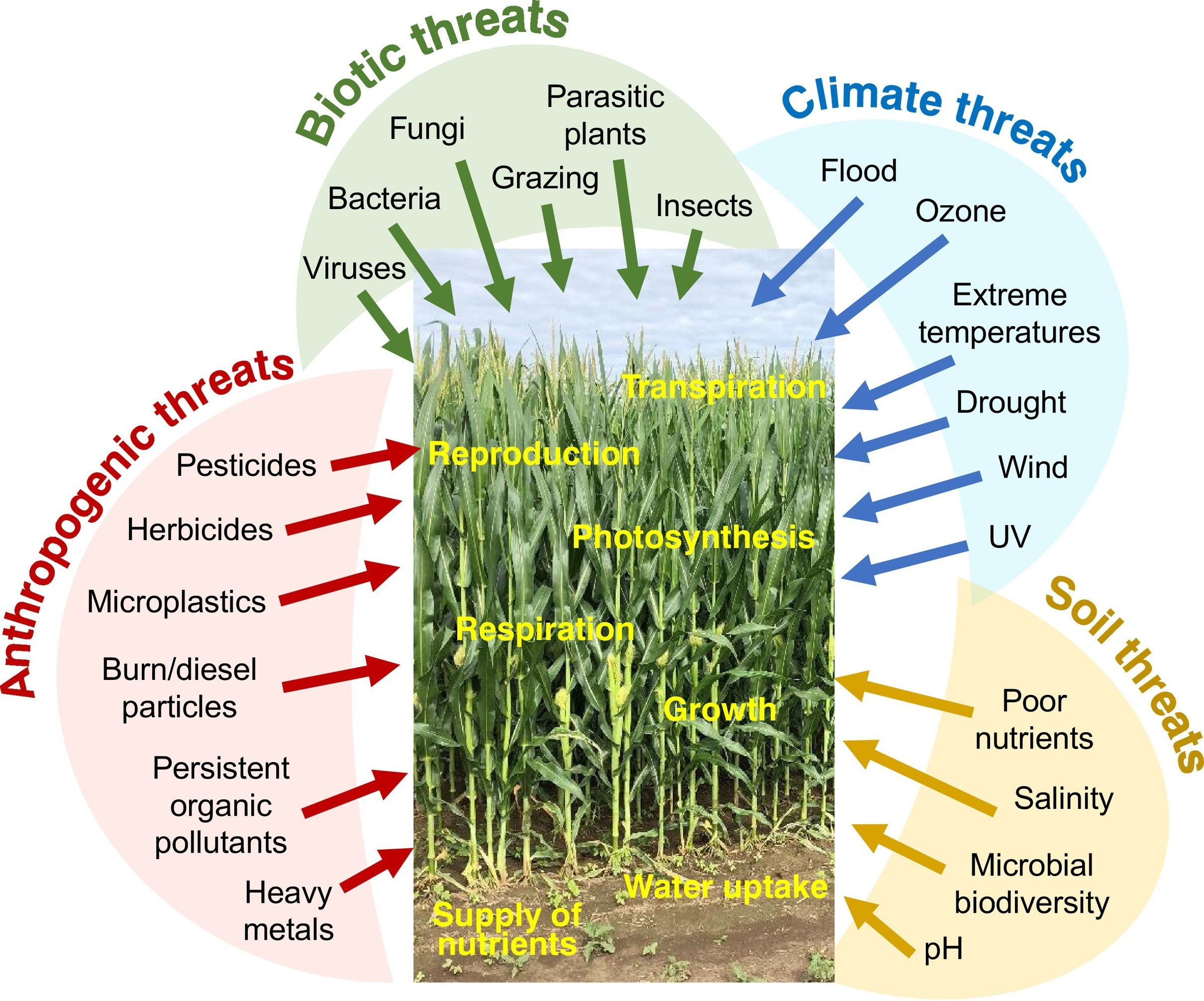
Schematic overview of the classes of stresses in plants

Plant stress measurement is the quantification of environmental effects on plant health. When plants are subjected to less than ideal growing conditions, they are considered to be under stress. Stress factors can affect growth, survival and crop yields. Plant stress research looks at the response of plants to limitations and excesses of the main abiotic factors (light, temperature, water and nutrients), and of other stress factors that are important in particular situations (e.g. pests, pathogens, or pollutants). Plant stress measurement usually focuses on taking measurements from living plants. It can involve visual assessments of plant vitality, however, more recently the focus has moved to the use of instruments and protocols that reveal the response of particular processes within the plant (especially, photosynthesis, plant cell signaling and plant secondary metabolism)

- Determining the optimal conditions for plant growth, e.g. optimizing water use in an agricultural system
- Determining the climatic range of different species or subspecies
- Determining which species or subspecies are resistant to a particular stress factor

== Instruments used to measure plant stress ==
Measurements can be made from living plants using specialized equipment. Among the most commonly used instruments are those that measure parameters related to photosynthesis (chlorophyll content, chlorophyll fluorescence, gas exchange) or water use (porometer, pressure bomb). In addition to these general purpose instruments, researchers often design or adapt other instruments tailored to the specific stress response they are studying.

== Photosynthesis systems ==
Photosynthesis systems use infrared gas analyzers (IRGAS) for measuring photosynthesis. CO_{2} concentration changes in leaf chambers are measured to provide carbon assimilation values for leaves or whole plants. Research has shown that the rate of photosynthesis is directly related to the amount of carbon assimilated by the plant. Measuring CO_{2} in the air, before it enters the leaf chamber, and comparing it to air measured for CO_{2} after it leaves the leaf chamber, provides this value using proven equations. These systems also use IRGAs, or solid state humidity sensors, for measuring H_{2}O changes in leaf chambers. This is done to measure leaf transpiration, and to correct CO_{2} measurements. The light absorption spectrum for CO_{2} and H_{2}O overlap somewhat, therefore, a correction is necessary for reliable CO_{2} measuring results. The critical measurement for most plant stress measurements is designated by "A" or carbon assimilation rate. When a plant is under stress, less carbon is assimilated. CO_{2} IRGAs are capable of measuring to approximately +/- 1 μmol or 1ppm of CO_{2}.

Because these systems are effective in measuring carbon assimilation and transpiration at low rates, as found in stressed plants, they are often used as the standard to compare to other types of instruments. Photosynthesis instruments come in field portable and laboratory versions. They are also designed to measure ambient environmental conditions, and some systems offer variable microclimate control of the measuring chamber. Microclimate control systems allow adjustment of the measuring chamber temperature, CO_{2} level, light level, and humidity level for more detailed investigation.

The combination of these systems with fluorometers, can be especially effective for some types of stress, and can be diagnostic, e.g. in the study of cold stress and drought stress.

== Chlorophyll fluorometers ==
Chlorophyll fluorescence emitted from plant leaves gives an insight into the health of the photosynthetic systems within the leaf. Chlorophyll fluorometers are designed to measure variable fluorescence of photosystem II. This variable fluorescence can be used to measure the level of plant stress. The most commonly used protocols include those aimed at measuring the photosynthetic efficiency of photosystem II, both in the light (ΔF/Fm') and in a dark-adapted state (Fv/Fm). Chlorophyll fluorometers are, for the most part, less expensive tools than photosynthesis systems, they also have a faster measurement time and tend to be more portable. For these reasons they have become one of the most important tools for field measurements of plant stress.

Chlorophyll fluorescence parameters are also used in screening plants for tolerance to abiotic stresses such as drought, salinity, heat, cold, and flooding. In particular, measurements of $F_v/F_m$ and effective quantum yield of photosystem II can indicate whether stress has reduced the efficiency of photochemistry in photosystem II before visible injury appears.

== Fv/Fm ==
Fv/Fm tests whether or not plant stress affects photosystem II in a dark adapted state. Fv/Fm is the most used chlorophyll fluorescence measuring parameter in the world. "The majority of fluorescence measurements are now made using modulated fluorometers with the leaf poised in a known state." (Neil Baker 2004).

Light that is absorbed by a leaf follows three competitive pathways. It may be used in photochemistry to produce ATP and NADPH used in photosynthesis, it can be re-emitted as fluorescence, or dissipated as heat. The Fv/Fm test is designed to allow the maximum amount of the light energy to take the fluorescence pathway. It compares the dark-adapted leaf pre-photosynthetic fluorescent state, called minimum fluorescence, or Fo, to maximum fluorescence called Fm. In maximum fluorescence, the maximum number of reaction centers have been reduced or closed by a saturating light source. In general, the greater the plant stress, the fewer open reaction centers available, and the Fv/Fm ratio is lowered. Fv/Fm is a measuring protocol that works for many types of plant stress.

In Fv/Fm measurements, after dark adaptation, minimum fluorescence is measured, using a modulated light source. This is a measurement of antennae fluorescence using a modulated light intensity that is too low to drive photosynthesis. Next, an intense light flash, or saturation pulse, of a limited duration, is used, to expose the sample, and close all available reaction centers. With all available reaction centers closed, or chemically reduced, maximum fluorescence is measured. The difference between maximum fluorescence and minimum fluorescence is Fv, or variable fluorescence. Fv/Fm is a normalized ratio created by dividing variable fluorescence by maximum fluorescence. It is a measurement ratio that represents the maximum potential quantum efficiency of Photosystem II if all capable reaction centers were open. An Fv/Fm value in the range of 0.79 to 0.84 is the approximate optimal value for many plant species, with lowered values indicating plant stress (Maxwell K., Johnson G. N. 2000), (Kitajima and Butler, 1975). Fv/Fm is a fast test that usually takes a few seconds. It was developed in and around 1975 by Kitajima and Butler. Dark adaptation times vary from about fifteen minutes to overnight. Some researchers will only use pre-dawn values.

In rice, $F_v/F_m$ has been used to evaluate photosystem II responses to flooding and submergence stress. Studies comparing genotypes with different submergence survival strategies have shown that chlorophyll fluorescence can help characterize changes in photosynthetic capacity during submergence and after re-aeration.

== Y(II) or ΔF/Fm' and ETR ==
Y(II) is a measuring protocol that was developed by Bernard Genty with the first publications in 1989 and 1990. It is a light adapted test that allows one to measure plant stress while the plant is undergoing the photosynthetic process at steady-state photosynthesis lighting conditions. Like Fv/Fm, Y(II) represents a measurement ratio of plant efficiency, but in this case, it is an indication of the amount of energy used in photochemistry by photosystem II under steady-state photosynthetic lighting conditions. For most types of plant stress, Y(II) correlates to plant carbon assimilation in a linear fashion in C_{4} plants. In C_{3} plants, most types of plant stress correlate to carbon assimilation in a curve-linear fashion. According to Maxwell and Johnson, it takes between fifteen and twenty minutes for a plant to reach steady-state photosynthesis at a specific light level. In the field, plants in full sunlight, and not under canopy, or partly cloudy conditions, are considered to be at steady state. In this test, light irradiation levels and leaf temperature must be controlled or measured, because while the Y(II) parameter levels vary with most types of plant stress, it also varies with light level and temperature. Y(II) values will be higher at lower light levels than at higher light levels. Y(II) has the advantage that it is more sensitive to a larger number of plant stress types than Fv/Fm.

ETR, or electron transport rate, is also a light-adapted parameter that is directly related to Y(II) by the equation, ETR = Y(II) × PAR × 0.84 × 0.5. By multiplying Y(II) by the irradiation light level in the PAR range (400 nm to 700 nm) in μmols, multiplied by the average ratio of light absorbed by the leaf 0.84, and multiplied by the average ratio of PSII reaction centers to PSI reaction centers, 0.50, relative ETR measurement is achieved.

Relative ETR values are valuable for stress measurements when comparing one plant to another, as long as the plants to be compared have similar light absorption characteristics. Leaf absorption characteristics can vary by water content, age, and other factors. If absorption differences are a concern, absorption can be measured with the use of an integrating sphere. For more accurate ETR values, the leaf absorption value and the ratio of PSII reaction centers to PSI reaction centers can be included in the equation. If different leaf absorption ratios are an issue, or they are an unwanted variable, then using Y(II) instead of ETR, may be the best choice. Four electrons must be transported for every CO_{2} molecule assimilated, or O_{2} molecule evolved, differences from gas exchange measurements, especially in C_{3} plants, can occur under conditions that promote photorespiration, cyclic electron transport, and nitrate reduction.

== Quenching measurements ==
Quenching measurements have been traditionally used for light stress, and heat stress measurements. In addition, they have been used to study plant photoprotective mechanisms, state transitions, plant photoinhibition, and the distribution of light energy in plants.

=== Puddle model and lake model quenching parameters ===
Lake model parameters were provided by Dave Kramer in 2004. Since then, Luke Hendrickson has provided simplified lake model parameters that allow the resurrection of the parameter NPQ, from the puddle model, back into the lake model.

== OJIP or OJIDP ==
OJIP or OJIDP is a dark adapted chlorophyll fluorescence technique that is used for plant stress measurement. It has been found that by using a high time resolution scale, the rise to maximum fluorescence from minimum fluorescence has intermediate peaks and dips, designated by the OJID and P nomenclature. Over the years, there have been multiple theories of what the rise, time scale, peaks and dips mean. In addition, there is more than one school as to how this information should be used for plant stress testing (Strasser 2004), (Vredenberg 2004, 2009, 2011). Like Fv/Fm, and the other protocols, the research shows that OJIP works better for some types of plant stress than it does for others.

== Chlorophyll content meters ==
These are instruments that use light transmission through a leaf, at two wavelengths, to determine the greenness and thickness of leaves. Transmission in the infrared range provides a measurement related to leaf thickness, and a wavelength in the red light range is used to determine greenness. The ratio of the transmission of the two wavelengths provides a chlorophyll content index that is referred to as CCI or alternatively as a SPAD index. CCI is a linear scale, and SPAD is a logarithmic scale. These instruments and scales have been shown to correlate to chlorophyll chemical tests for chlorophyll content except at very high levels.

Chlorophyll content meters are commonly used for nutrient plant stress measurement, that includes nitrogen stress, and sulfur stress. Because research has shown, that if used correctly, chlorophyll content meters are reliable for nitrogen management work, these meters are often the instruments of choice for crop fertilizer management because they are relatively inexpensive. Research has demonstrated that by comparing well fertilized plants to test plants, the ratio of the chlorophyll content index of test plants, divided by the chlorophyll content index of well fertilized plants, will provide a ratio that is an indication of when fertilization should occur, and how much should be used. It is common to use a well fertilized stand of crops in a specific field and sometimes in different areas of the same field, as the fertilization reference, due to differences from field to field and within a field. The research done to date uses either ten and thirty measurements on test and well fertilized crops, to provide average values. Studies have been done for corn and wheat. One paper suggests that when the ratio drops below 95%, it is time to fertigate. The amounts of fertilizer are also recommended.

Crop consultants also use these tools for fertilizer recommendations. However, because strict scientific protocols are more time consuming and more expensive, consultants sometimes use well-fertilized plants located in low-lying areas as the standard well-fertilized plants. They typically also use fewer measurements. The evidence for this approach involves anecdotal discussions with crop consultants. Chlorophyll content meters are sensitive to both nitrogen and sulfur stress at usable levels. Chlorophyll fluorometers require a special assay, involving a high actinic light level in combination with nitrogen stress, to measure nitrogen stress at usable levels. In addition, chlorophyll fluorometers will only detect sulfur stress at starvation levels. For best results, chlorophyll content measurements should be made when water deficits are not present. Photosynthesis systems will detect both nitrogen and sulfur stress.

== See also ==
- Climate change mitigation
- Adaptation to global warming
- Breeding for drought stress tolerance
- Breeding for heat stress tolerance
