= Hardiness (plants) =

Ability to survive adverse growing conditions

Hardiness of plants describes their ability to survive adverse growing conditions. It is usually limited to discussions of climatic adversity. Thus a plant's ability to tolerate cold, heat, drought, flooding, or wind are typically considered measurements of hardiness. Hardiness of plants is defined by their native extent's geographic location: longitude, latitude and elevation. These attributes are often simplified to a hardiness zone. In temperate latitudes, the term most often describes resistance to cold, or "cold-hardiness", and is generally measured by the lowest temperature a plant can withstand.

Hardiness of a plant may be divided into two categories: tender, and hardy. Tender plants are those killed by freezing temperatures, while hardy plants survive freezing—at least down to certain temperatures, depending on the plant. "Half-hardy" is a term used sometimes in horticulture to describe bedding plants which are sown indoors in heat in winter or early spring, and planted outside after all danger of frost has passed. "Fully hardy" usually refers to plants being classified under the Royal Horticultural Society classifications, and can often cause confusion to those not using this method. When this distinction is made a fully tropical plant that requires hot temperatures to grow and display is termed a "tender" plant.

Plants vary greatly in their tolerance of growing conditions, and are capable of adaptation to changes in climate on their own to some extent. The selective breeding of varieties capable of withstanding particular climates forms an important part of agriculture and horticulture. Part of the work of nursery growers of plants consists of cold hardening, or hardening off their plants, to prepare them for likely conditions in later life.

== Winter hardiness ==
Winter-hardy plants grow during the winter, or at least remain healthy and dormant. Apart from hardy evergreens, these include many cultivated plants, including varieties of cabbage and broccoli, and all kinds of carrot. Some bulbs – such as tulips – need cold winters to bloom. Many domestic plants are assigned a hardiness zone that specifies the climates in which they can survive. Winter gardens are dependent upon the cultivation of winter-hardy plants.

=== Mechanisms ===
Woody plants survive freezing temperatures by suppressing the formation of ice in living cells or by allowing water to freeze in plant parts that are not affected by ice formation. The common mechanism for woody plants to survive down to –40 °C (–40 °F) is supercooling. Woody plants that survive lower temperatures are dehydrating their cells, allowing water to freeze between cell walls and the cells to survive. Plants normally considered hardy may not survive freezing if they are not readily acclimated, which renders them unable to use these mechanisms. Some plants are able to withstand freezing temperatures year-round, like those living in Antarctica such as Colobanthus quitensis.

== Hardiness ratings ==
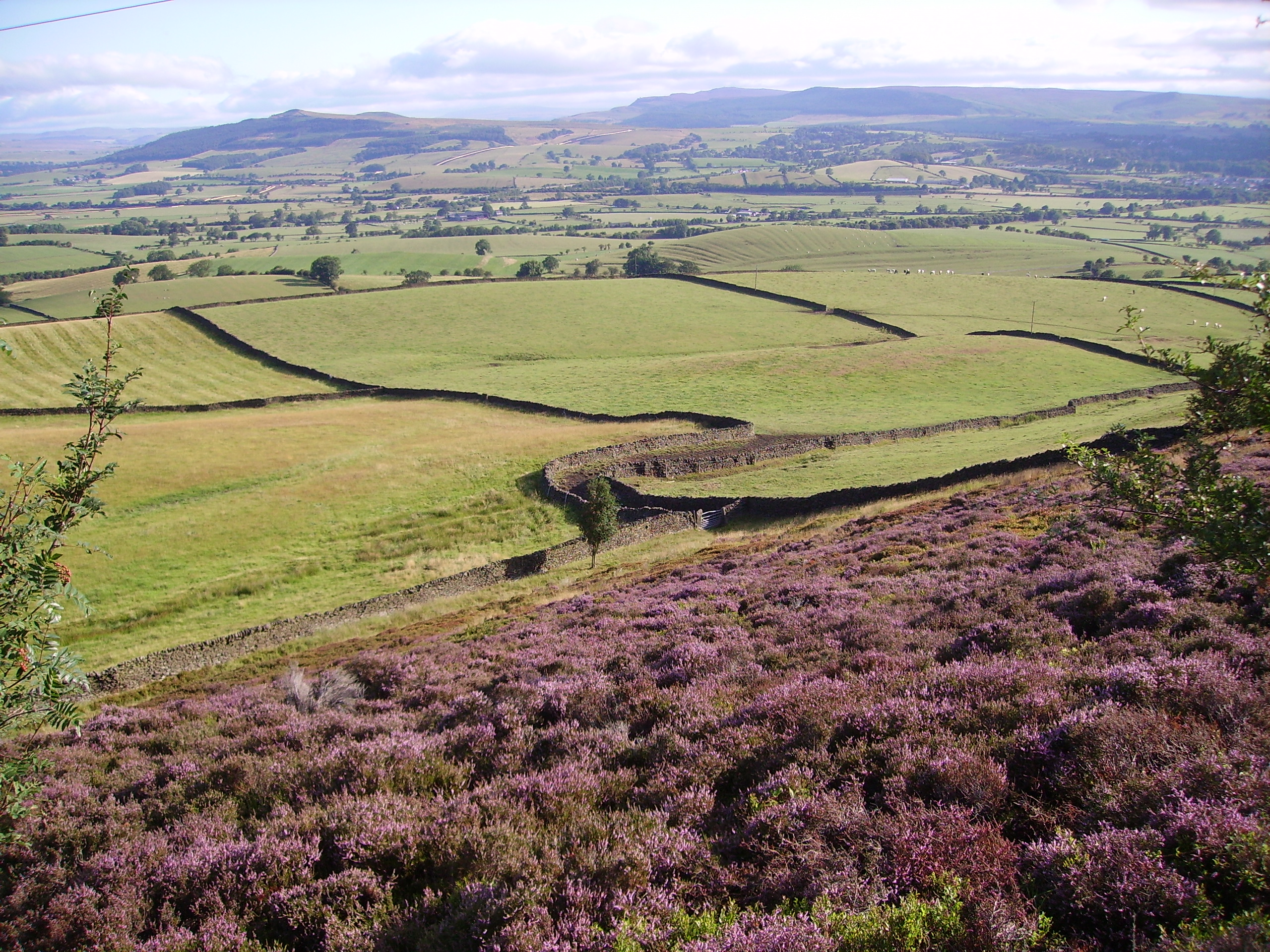
Heather, Calluna vulgaris, one of Britain's hardiest plants (North York Moors)

Various hardiness ratings are published. In the United States (US), the most widely used is the U.S. Department of Agriculture (USDA) system of hardiness zones based on average minimum yearly temperatures. This system was developed specifically for the extremely diverse range of conditions in the US, from baking desert to frozen tundra. Another commonly used system is the Sunset Climate Zone system. This system is much more specific to climates (i.e. precipitation, temperature, and humidity based) and less dependent on the yearly minimum.

In contrast the United Kingdom (UK) and Western Europe have an oceanic climate, and experience a narrower range of temperatures that is tempered by the presence of the Gulf Stream. This results in areas like western Scotland experiencing relatively mild winter conditions and cool summers that enable the growing of some subtropical plants, despite being well to the north of subtropical climate areas. The Royal Horticultural Society has published a set of hardiness ratings applicable to the UK. The ratings range from H1a to H7. H1a, higher than 15 °C (59 °F), applies to tropical plants permanently under glass in heat; while H7, below −20 °C (−4 °F), applies to very cold-tolerant plants such as heathers. Most outdoor plants in the UK fall within the range H4, −10 to −5 °C (14 to 23 °F) (hardy in the average winter) to H5, −15 to −10 °C (5 to 14 °F) (hardy in a cold winter). Also, the average minimum temperature in the UK is much warmer than the average minimums in much of the northern US, while the average maximums in the northern US are often much warmer in summer than the UK.

In addition to cold tolerance, plant hardiness has been observed to be linked to how much stress specific plants are undergoing into the winter, or even how fast the onset of cold weather is in a specific year. This means that often stressed plants will exhibit less cold tolerance than plants that have been well maintained. Plants may also die if the winter changes from balmy to exceptionally cold in a short period of time.

== Hardy plants ==
Hardy plants are generally known as plants that can tolerate a variety of extreme (both cold and hot) temperatures, harsh environments, and poor or eroded soils, such as milkweed and cranesbill. They are economically advantageous because of their little or negligible maintenance.

== Other hardiness ==
Tolerance to other kinds of climatic factors include:

- Heat tolerance, sometimes defined as part of the cold hardiness spectrum, as in the American Horticultural Society's "heat zones". See also Thermoregulation § In plants and Breeding for heat stress tolerance.
- Drought tolerance, discussed in Drought § Impact on crops and Breeding for drought stress tolerance
- Flood tolerance
- Wind tolerance, the mechanisms of which remain poorly understood. Wind not only causes mechanical stress, but also makes the plant colder and dryer. Plants may evolutionally adapt to wind by becoming smaller (to avoid wind) or bigger (to resist the wind). Physiologically, the mechanical force also causes a cascade of signals in the living plant.

== See also ==
- Microclimate
- Hardy Plant Society

== Bibliography ==
- RHS (2017). "RHS hardiness rating". RHS hardiness rating. Royal Horticultural Society.
- "2006 arborday.org Hardiness Zone Map". National Arbor Day Foundation.
- "Differences between 1990 USDA Hardiness Zones and 2006 arborday.org hardiness zones reflect warmer climate". National Arbor Day Foundation.
