= Drought tolerance =

Ability of a plant to withstand dry conditions

In botany, drought tolerance is the ability by which a plant maintains its biomass production during arid or drought conditions. Some plants are naturally adapted to dry conditions, surviving with protection mechanisms such as desiccation tolerance, detoxification, or repair of xylem embolism. Other plants, specifically crops like corn, wheat, and rice, have become increasingly tolerant to drought with new varieties created via genetic engineering. From an evolutionary perspective, the type of mycorrhizal associations formed in the roots of plants can determine how fast plants can adapt to drought.

The mechanisms behind drought tolerance are complex and involve many pathways which allows plants to respond to specific sets of conditions at any given time. Some of these interactions include stomatal conductance, carotenoid degradation and anthocyanin accumulation, the intervention of osmoprotectants (such as sucrose, glycine, and proline), ROS-scavenging enzymes. The molecular control of drought tolerance is also very complex and is influenced other factors such as environment and the developmental stage of the plant. This control consists mainly of transcriptional factors, such as dehydration-responsive element-binding protein (DREB), abscisic acid (ABA)-responsive element-binding factor (AREB), and NAM (no apical meristem).

== Physiology of drought tolerance ==
Plants can be subjected to slowly developing water shortages (i.e., taking days, weeks, or months), or they may face short-term deficits of water (i.e., hours to days). In these situations, plants adapt by responding accordingly, minimizing water loss and maximizing water uptake. Plants are more susceptible to drought stress during the reproductive stages of growth, flowering and seed development. Therefore, the combination of short-term plus long-term responses allow for plants to produce a few viable seeds. Some examples of short-term and long-term physiological responses include:

=== Short-term responses ===
- In the leaf: root-signal recognition, stomatal closure, decreased carbon assimilation
- In the stem: inhibition of growth, hydraulic changes, signal transport, assimilation of transport
- In the root: cell-drought signalling, osmotic adjustment

=== Long-term responses ===
- In the above-ground portion of the plant: inhibition of shoot growth, reduced transpiration area, grain abortion, senescence, metabolic acclimation, osmotic adjustment, anthocyanin accumulation, carotenoid degradation, intervention of osmoprotectants, ROS-scavenging enzymes
- In the below-ground portion of the plant: turgor maintenance, sustained root growth, increased root/shoot, increased absorption area

== Regulatory network of drought tolerance ==
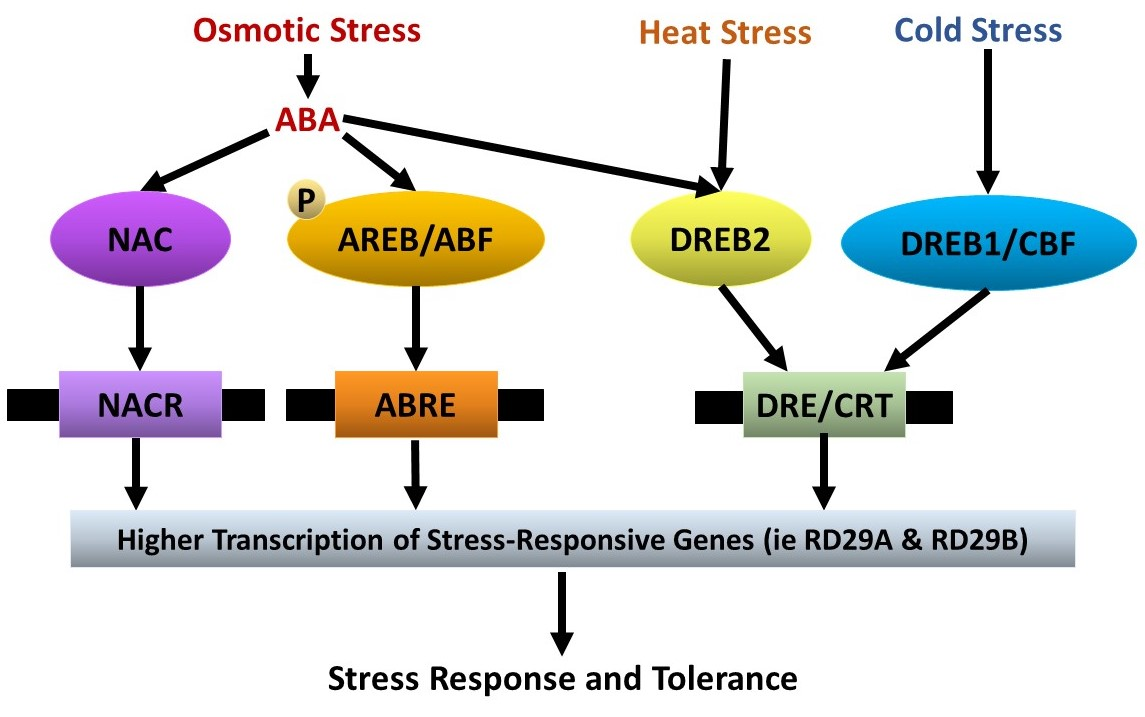
Abiotic stresses (such as drought) induce the expression of the following transcription factors. They bind to cis-elements, resulting in a change in stress response and tolerance.

In response to drought conditions, there is an alteration of gene expression, induced by or activated by transcription factors (TFs). These TFs bind to specific cis-elements to induce the expression of targeted stress-inducible genes, allowing for products to be transcribed that help with stress response and tolerance. Some of these include dehydration-responsive element-binding protein (DREB), ABA-responsive element-binding factor (AREB), no apical meristem (NAM), Arabidopsis transcription activation factor (ATAF), and cup-shaped cotyledon (CUC). Much of the molecular work to understand the regulation of drought tolerance has been done in Arabidopsis, helping elucidate the basic processes below.

=== DREB TFs ===
==== DREB1/CBF TFs ====
DREB1A, DREB 1B, and DREB 1C are plant specific TFs which bind to drought responsive elements (DREs) in promoters responsive to drought, high salinity and low temperature in Arabidopsis. Overexpression of these genes enhance the tolerance of drought, high salinity, and low temperature in transgenic lines from Arabidopsis, rice, and tobacco.

===== DEAR1/DREB and EAR motif protein 1 =====
DEAR1 ("DREB and EAR motif protein 1") is a TF with an entirely different purpose nothing to do with drought stress. Tsutsui et al. 2009 found Arabidopsis DEAR1 (At3g50260) to respond to pathogen infection, chitin, and oligomers of chitin.

==== DREB2 TFs ====
DREB proteins are involved in a variety of functions related to drought tolerance. For example, DREB proteins including DREB2A cooperate with AREB/ABF proteins in gene expression, specifically in the DREB2A gene under osmotic stress conditions. DREB2 also induces the expression of heat-related genes, such as heat shock protein. Overexpression of DREB2Aca enhances drought and heat stress tolerance levels in Arabidopsis.

=== AREB/ABF TFs ===
AREB/ABFs are ABA-responsive bZIP-type TFs which bind to ABA-responsive elements (ABREs) in stress-responsive promoters and activate gene expression. AREB1, AREB2, ABF3, and ABF1 have important roles in ABA signalling in the vegetative stage, as ABA controls the expression of genes associated with drought response and tolerance. The native form of AREB1 cannot target drought stress genes like RD29B in Arabidopsis, so modification is necessary for transcriptional activation. AREB/ABFs are positively regulated by SnRK2s, controlling the activity of target proteins via phosphorylation. This regulation also functions in the control of drought tolerance in the vegetative stage as well as the seed maturation and germination.

=== Other TFs ===
TFs such as NAC (composed of NAM, ATAF, and CUC), are also related to drought response in Arabidopsis and rice. Overexpression in the aforementioned plants improves stress and drought tolerance. They also may be related to root growth and senescence, two physiological traits related to drought tolerance.

== Natural drought tolerance adaptations ==
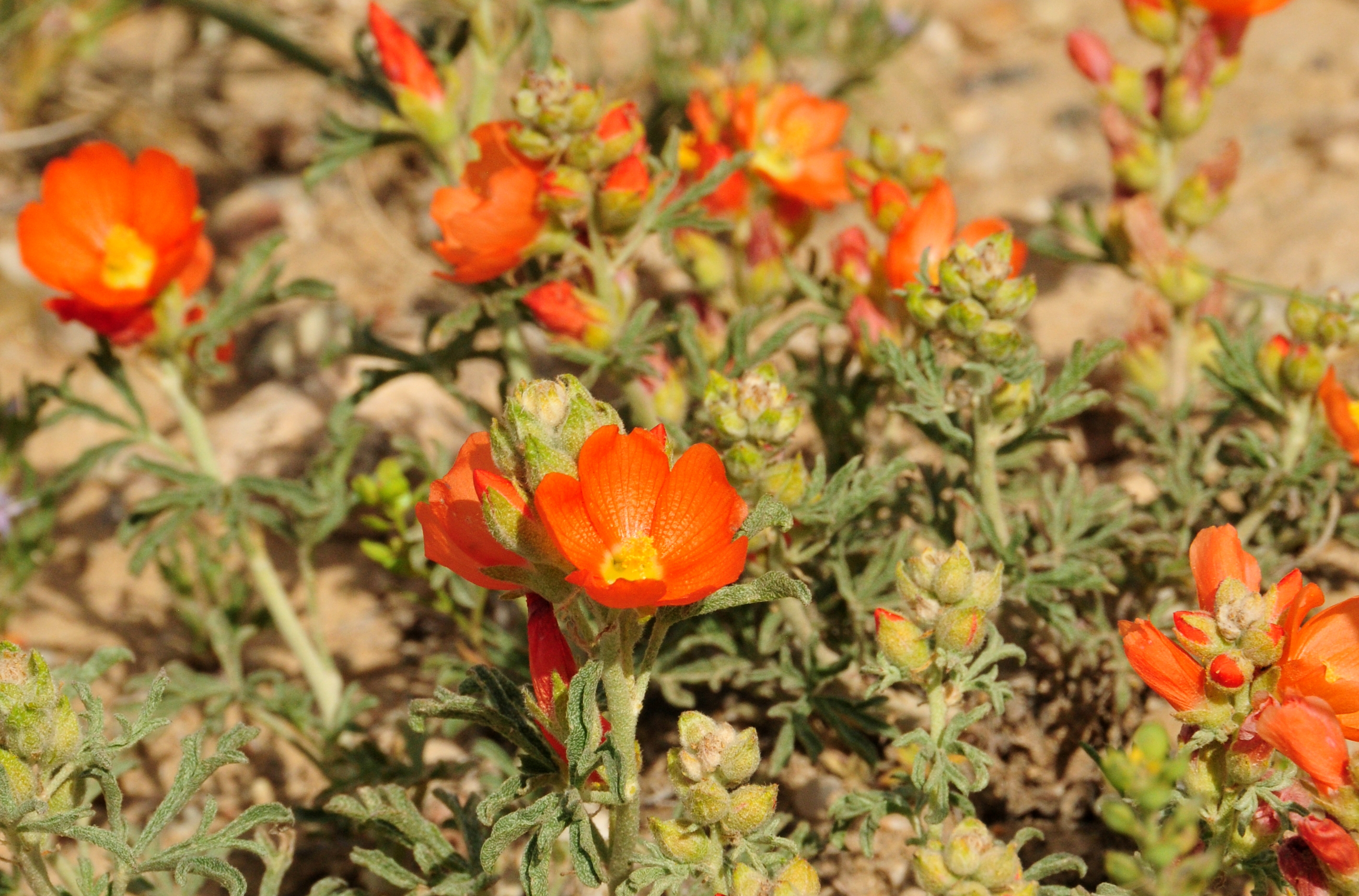
The scarlet globe mallow (Sphaeralcea coccinea) is a drought-escaping plant with natural drought tolerance. Some of its natural adaptations include silver-gray hairs that protect against drying; a deep root system; and having seeds that only germinate when conditions are favorable.

Plants in naturally arid conditions retain large amounts of biomass due to drought tolerance and can be classified into 4 categories of adaptation:

1. Drought-escaping plants: annuals that germinate and grow only during times of sufficient times of moisture to complete their life cycle.
2. Drought-evading plants: non-succulent perennials which restrict their growth only to periods of moisture availability.
3. Drought-enduring plants: also known as xerophytes, these evergreen shrubs have extensive root systems along with morphological and physiological adaptations which enable them to maintain growth even in times of extreme drought conditions.
4. Drought-resisting plants: also known as succulent perennials, they have water stored in their leaves and stems for sparing uses.

=== Structural adaptations ===
Many adaptations for dry conditions are structural, including the following:

- Adaptations of the stomata to reduce water loss, such as reduced numbers, sunken pits, waxy surfaces....
- Reduced number of leaves and their surface area.
- Water storage in succulent above-ground parts or water-filled tubers.
- Crassulacean acid metabolism (CAM metabolism) allows plants to get carbon dioxide at night and store malic acid during the day, allowing photosynthesis to take place with minimized water loss.
- Adaptations in the root system to increase water absorption.
- Trichomes (small hairs) on the leaves to absorb atmospheric water.

== Importance for agriculture ==
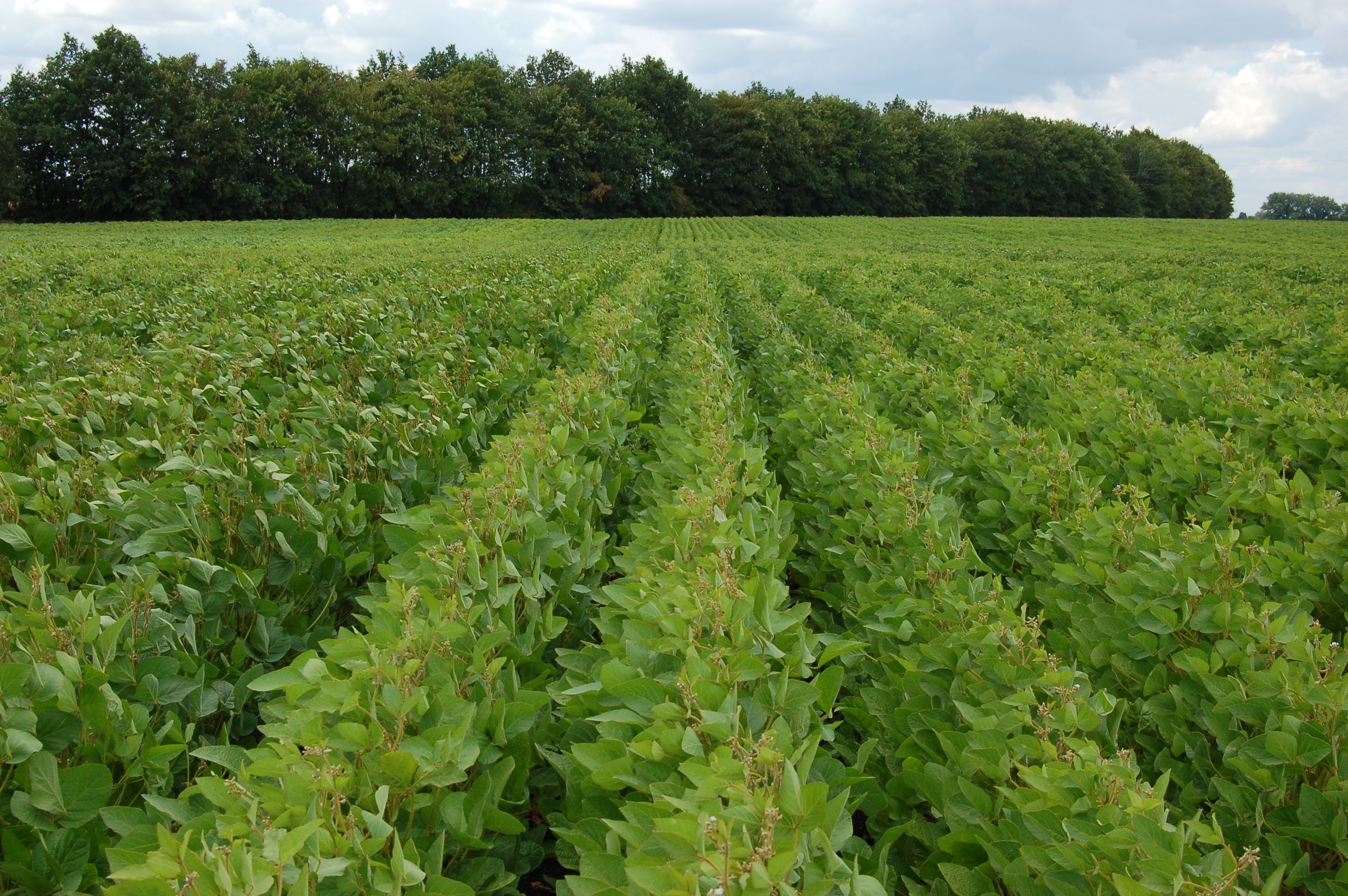
Estafeta is a soybean with enhanced drought tolerance, developed by the Plant Production Institute of Ukraine.

With the frequency and severity of droughts increasing in recent years, damage to crops has become more serious, lowering the crop yield, growth, and production. However, research into the molecular pathways involving stress tolerance have revealed that overexpression of such genes can enhance drought tolerance, leading to projects focused on the development of transgenic crop varieties.

Drought-tolerant plants which are developed through biotechnology enable farmers to protect their harvest and reduces losses in times of intense drought by using water more efficiently.

=== Collaborations to improve drought tolerance in crop-variety plants ===
International research projects to improve drought tolerance have been introduced, such as the Consultative Group on International Agricultural Research (CGIAR). One such project from CGIAR involves introducing genes such as DREB1 into lowland rice, upland rice, and wheat to evaluate drought tolerance in fields. This project aims to select at least 10 lines for agricultural use. Another similar project in collaboration with CGIAR, Embrapa, RIKEN, and the University of Tokyo have introduced AREB and DREB stress-tolerant genes into soybeans, finding several transgenic soybean lines with drought tolerance. Both projects have found improved grain yield and will be used to help develop future varieties that can be used commercially.

Other examples of collaborations to improve drought tolerance in crop-variety plants include the International Center for Agricultural Research in Dry Areas (ICARDA) in Aleppo, Syria; the International Crops Research Institute for the Semi-Arid Tropics (ICRISAT) in Andhra Pradesh, India; the International Rice Research Institute (IRRI) in Los Baños, Philippines.; and the Heat and Drought Wheat Improvement Consortium (HeDWIC), a network that facilitates global coordination of wheat research to adapt to a future with more severe weather extremes.

=== Impediments to the agricultural commercialization of drought tolerant plants ===
The development of genetically modified crops includes multiple patents for genes and promoters, such as the marker genes in a vector, as well as transformation techniques. Therefore, freedom-to-operate (FTO) surveys should be implemented in collaborations for developing drought tolerant crops. Large amounts of money are also needed for the development of genetically modified groups. To bring a new genetically modified crop into the commercial market, it has been estimated to cost US$136 million over 13 years. This poses a problem for development, as only a small number of companies can afford to develop drought-tolerant crops, and it is difficult for research institutions to sustain funding for this period of time. Therefore, a multinational framework with more collaboration among multiple disciples is needed to sustain projects of this size.

== Importance in horticulture ==
Plant transformation has been used to develop multiple drought resistant crop varieties, but only limited varieties of ornamental plants. This significant lag in development is due to the fact that more transgenic ornamental plants are being developed for other reasons than drought tolerance. However, abiotic stress resistance is being explored in ornamental plants by Ornamental Biosciences. Transgenic Petunias, Poinsettias, New Guinea Impatiens, and Geraniums are being evaluated for frost, drought, and disease resistance. This will allow for a wider range of environments in which these plants can grow.

== Drought-tolerant plants ==
This is a list of selected plant families, species and/or genus that tolerate drought:

- Acacia
- Acer rubrum
- Adenium
- Aeonium
- Agapanthus
- Agave
- Aloe
- Angelonia
- Anredera cordifolia
- Araujia sericifera
- Arctotheca calendula
- Araucaria araucana
- Asphodelus
- Asparagus aethiopicus
- Banksia
- Begonia
- Bougainvillea
- Buddleja davidii
- Bulbine
- Cactus
- Calibrachoa
- Callitris
- Carpobrotus
- Cestrum parqui
- Cistus albidus
- Cosmos
- Crassula
- Curio
- Cycas multipinnata
- Dioon
- Drosanthemum
- Dudleya
- Echeveria
- Echinacea
- Eriogonum
- Eucalyptus
- Euphorbia milii
- Gaillardia
- Gazania rigens
- Gonialoe
- Graptopetalum
- Grevillea
- Ginkgo
- Haberlea
- Haloxylon ammodendron
- Haworthia
- Helianthus
- Impatiens hawkeri
- Ipomoea cairica
- Lantana camara
- Laurus nobilis
- Melaleuca
- Mesembryanthemum
- Nandina domestica
- Junipers
- Nerium oleander
- Olea europaea
- Pecan
- Pelargonium
- Petunia
- Pinus edulis
- Portulaca
- Portulacaria afra
- Ramonda serbica
- Ricinus communis
- Platanus racemosa
- Pterocarya fraxinifolia
- Pterocarya stenoptera
- Polystichum acrostichoides
- Rosemary
- Salvia
- Santolina
- Sedum
- Senecio angulatus
- Senecio elegans
- Tetradenia riparia
- Thunbergia alata
- Vinca
- Vitis vinifera
- Yucca
- Zelkova

== See also ==
- Adaptation to global warming
- Abscisic acid
- Breeding for drought stress tolerance
- Climate change mitigation
