= Subsistence agriculture =

Farming to meet basic needs

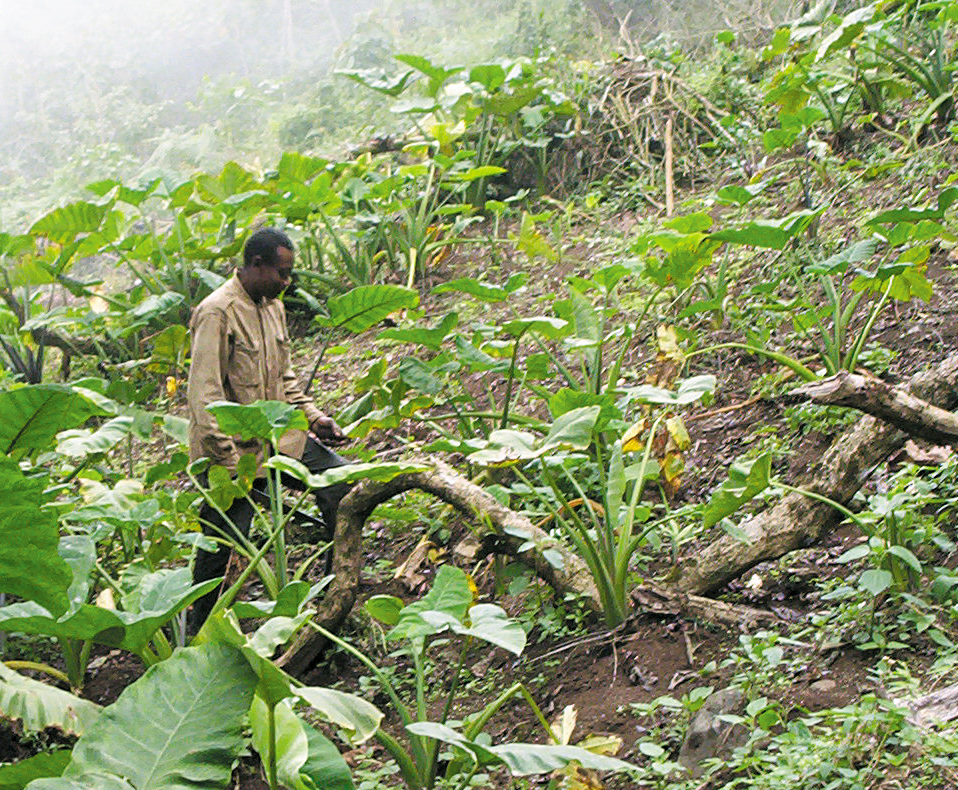
A Bakweri farmer working on his taro field on the slopes of Mount Cameroon, 2005

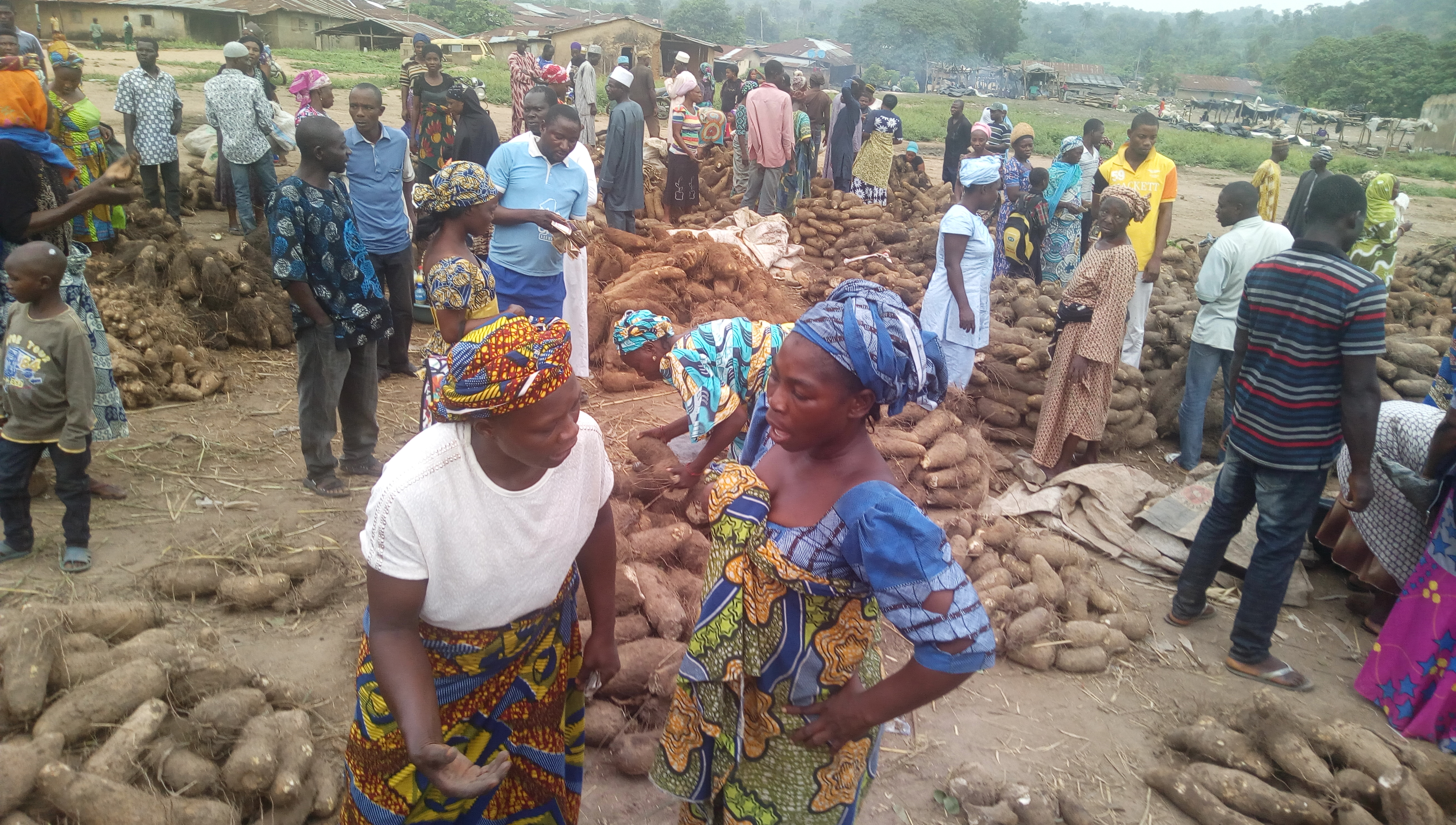
Subsistence farmers selling their produce, 2017

Subsistence agriculture occurs when farmers grow crops on smallholdings to meet the needs of themselves and their families. Subsistence agriculturalists target farm output for survival and mostly for local requirements. Planting decisions occur principally with an eye toward what the family will need during the coming year, and only secondarily toward market prices. Tony Waters, a professor of sociology, defines "subsistence peasants" as "people who grow what they eat, build their own houses, and live without regularly making purchases in the marketplace".

Despite the self-sufficiency in subsistence farming, most subsistence farmers also participate in trade to some degree. Although their amount of trade as measured in cash is less than that of consumers in countries with modern complex markets, they use these markets mainly to obtain goods, not to generate income for food; these goods are typically not necessary for survival and may include sugar, iron roofing-sheets, bicycles, used clothing, and so forth. Many have important trade contacts and trade items that they can produce because of their special skills or special access to resources valued in the marketplace.

Subsistence farming today is most common in developing countries. Subsistence agriculture generally features small capital and finance requirements, mixed cropping, limited use of agrochemicals (such as pesticides and fertilizer), unimproved varieties of crops and animals, little or no surplus yield for sale, use of crude, traditional tools (such as hoes, machetes, and cutlasses), mainly the production of crops, small scattered plots of land, reliance on inexperienced or untrained labor (often family members), and (generally) low yields.

== History ==
Subsistence agriculture was the dominant mode of production in Europe and North America until around 1800, when market-based capitalism became widespread.

During the Industrial Revolution, subsistence farmers moved to the cities and took industrial jobs. This created a large urban population for which the remaining farmers could charge higher prices for their agricultural produce.

Subsistence agriculture largely disappeared in Europe by the beginning of the twentieth century. It began to decrease in North America with the movement of sharecroppers and tenant farmers out of the American South and Midwest during the 1930s and 1940s. In Central and Eastern Europe, semi-subsistence agriculture reappeared within the transition economy after 1990 but declined in significance (or disappeared) in most countries by the accession to the European Union in 2004 or 2007.

== Contemporary practices ==
Subsistence farming continues today in large parts of rural Africa, and parts of Asia and Latin America. In 2015, about 2 billion people (slightly more than 25% of the world's population) in 500 million households living in rural areas of developing nations survive as "smallholder" farmers, working less than 2 hectares (5 acres) of land. Around 98% of China's farmers work on small farms, and China accounts for around half of the total world farms. In India, 80% of the total farmers are smallholder farmers; Ethiopia and Asia have almost 90% being small; while Mexico and Brazil recorded 50% and 20% being small.

Areas where subsistence farming is largely practiced today, such as India and other regions in Asia, have seen a recent decline in the practice. This is due to processes such as urbanization, the transformation of land into rural areas, and the integration of capitalist forms of farming. In India, the increase in industrialization and decrease in rural agriculture have led to rural unemployment and increased poverty for those in lower caste groups. Those who can live and work in urbanized areas can increase their income, while those who remain in rural areas take large decreases, which is why there was no large decline in poverty. This effectively widens the income gap between lower and higher castes and makes it harder for those in rural areas to move up in caste ranking. This era has marked a time of increased farmer suicides and the "vanishing village".

=== Adaptation to global warming ===
Most subsistence agriculture is practiced in developing countries located in tropical climates. Effects on crop production brought about by climate change will be more intense in these regions as extreme temperatures are linked to lower crop yields. Farmers have been forced to respond to increased temperatures through things such as increased land and labor inputs which threaten long-term productivity. Coping measures in response to variable climates can include reducing daily food consumption and selling livestock to compensate for the decreased productivity. These responses often threaten the future of household farms in the following seasons as many farmers will sell draft animals used for labor and will also consume seeds saved for planting. Measuring the full extent of future climate change impacts is difficult to determine as smallholder farms are complex systems with many different interactions. Different locations have different adaptation strategies available to them such as crop and livestock substitutions. Rates of production for cereal crops, such as wheat, oats, and maize have been declining largely due to heat's effects on crop fertility. This has forced many farmers to switch to more heat-tolerant crops to maintain levels of productivity. Substitution of crops for heat-tolerant alternatives limits the overall diversity of crops grown on smallholder farms. As many farmers farm to meet daily food needs, this can negatively affect nutrition and diet among many families practicing subsistence agriculture.

Water availability has a crucial role in determining the productivity of subsistence agriculture, especially in dryland regions. Rain-fed farming, common in many areas, relies only on natural precipitation. Because of this, dryland farming is particularly susceptible to the ill effects of climate change in areas where weather patterns are already very erratic.

== Types of subsistence farming ==
=== Shifting agriculture ===
In this type of farming, a patch of forest land is cleared by a combination of felling (chopping down) and burning, and crops are grown. After two to three years, the fertility of the soil begins to decline, the land is abandoned and the farmer moves to clear a fresh piece of land elsewhere in the forest as the process continues. While the land is left fallow the forest regrows in the cleared area and soil fertility and biomass are restored. After a decade or more, the farmer may return to the first piece of land. This form of agriculture is sustainable at low population densities, but higher population loads require more frequent clearing which prevents soil fertility from recovering, opens up more of the forest canopy, and encourages scrub at the expense of large trees, eventually resulting in deforestation and soil erosion. Shifting cultivation is called bewar, podu or dahya in India, ladang in Indonesia and jhumming in North East India.

=== Sedentary farming ===
While shifting agriculture's slash-and-burn technique may describe the method for opening new land, commonly the farmers in question have in existence at the same time smaller fields, sometimes merely gardens, near the homestead where they practice intensive "non-shifting" techniques. These farmers pair this with "slash and burn" techniques to clear additional land and, by the burning, provide fertilizer (ash). Such gardens near the homestead often regularly receive household refuse. The manure of any household chickens or goats is initially thrown into compost piles just to get them out of the way. However, such farmers often recognize the value of such compost and apply it regularly to their smaller fields. They may also irrigate part of such fields if they are near a source of water.

In some areas of tropical Africa, at least, such smaller fields may be ones in which crops are grown on raised beds. Thus farmers practicing "slash and burn" agriculture are often much more sophisticated agriculturalists than the term "slash and burn" subsistence farmers suggests.

=== Nomadic herding ===
In this type of farming people migrate along with their animals from one place to another in search of fodder for their animals. Generally they rear cattle, sheep, goats, camels and/or yaks for milk, skin, meat and wool. This way of life is common in parts of central and western Asia, India, east and southwest Africa and northern Eurasia. Examples are the nomadic Bhotiyas and Gujjars of the Himalayas. They carry their belongings, such as tents, etc., on the backs of donkeys, horses, and camels. In mountainous regions, like Tibet and the Andes, yak and llama are reared. Reindeer are the livestock in arctic and sub-arctic areas. Sheep, goats, and camels are common animals, and cattle and horses are also important.

=== Intensive subsistence farming ===
In intensive subsistence agriculture, the farmer cultivates a small plot of land using simple tools and more labour. Climate with large number of days with sunshine and fertile soils, permits growing of more than one crop annually on the same plot. Farmers use their small land holdings to produce enough for their local consumption, while the remaining produce is used for exchange against other goods. It results in much more food being produced per acre compared to other subsistence patterns. In the most intensive situation, farmers may even create terraces along steep hillsides to cultivate rice paddies. Such fields are found in densely populated parts of Asia, such as in the Philippines. They may also intensify by using manure, artificial irrigation and animal waste as fertilizer. Intensive subsistence farming is prevalent in the thickly populated areas of the monsoon regions of south, southwest, and southeast Asia.

== Poverty alleviation ==
Subsistence agriculture can be used as a poverty alleviation strategy, specifically as a safety net for food-price shocks and for food security. Poor countries are limited in fiscal and institutional resources that would allow them to contain rises in domestic prices as well as to manage social assistance programs, which is often because they are using policy tools that are intended for middle- and high-income countries. Low-income countries tend to have populations in which 80% of poor are in rural areas. More than 90% of rural households have access to land, yet most of these poor have insufficient access to food. Subsistence agriculture can be used in low-income countries as a part of policy responses to a food crisis in the short and medium term and provide a safety net for the poor in these countries.

Agriculture is more successful than non-agricultural jobs in combating poverty in countries with a larger population of people without education or who are unskilled. However, there are levels of poverty to be aware of to target agriculture towards the right audience. Agriculture is better at reducing poverty in those that have an income of $1 per day than those that have an income of $2 per day in Africa. People who make less income are more likely to be poorly educated and have fewer opportunities; therefore, they work more labor-intensive jobs, such as agriculture. People who make $2 have more opportunities to work in less labor-intensive jobs in non-agricultural fields.

== See also ==
- Allotment (gardening)
- Back-to-the-land movement
- Cash crop
- Commercial agriculture
- Extensive agriculture
- Hoe-farming
- Industrial agriculture
- Opium replacement
- Permaculture
- Subsistence economy
- Subsistence fishing
- Urban agriculture
