= Nitrogen deficiency =

Nutrient deficiency

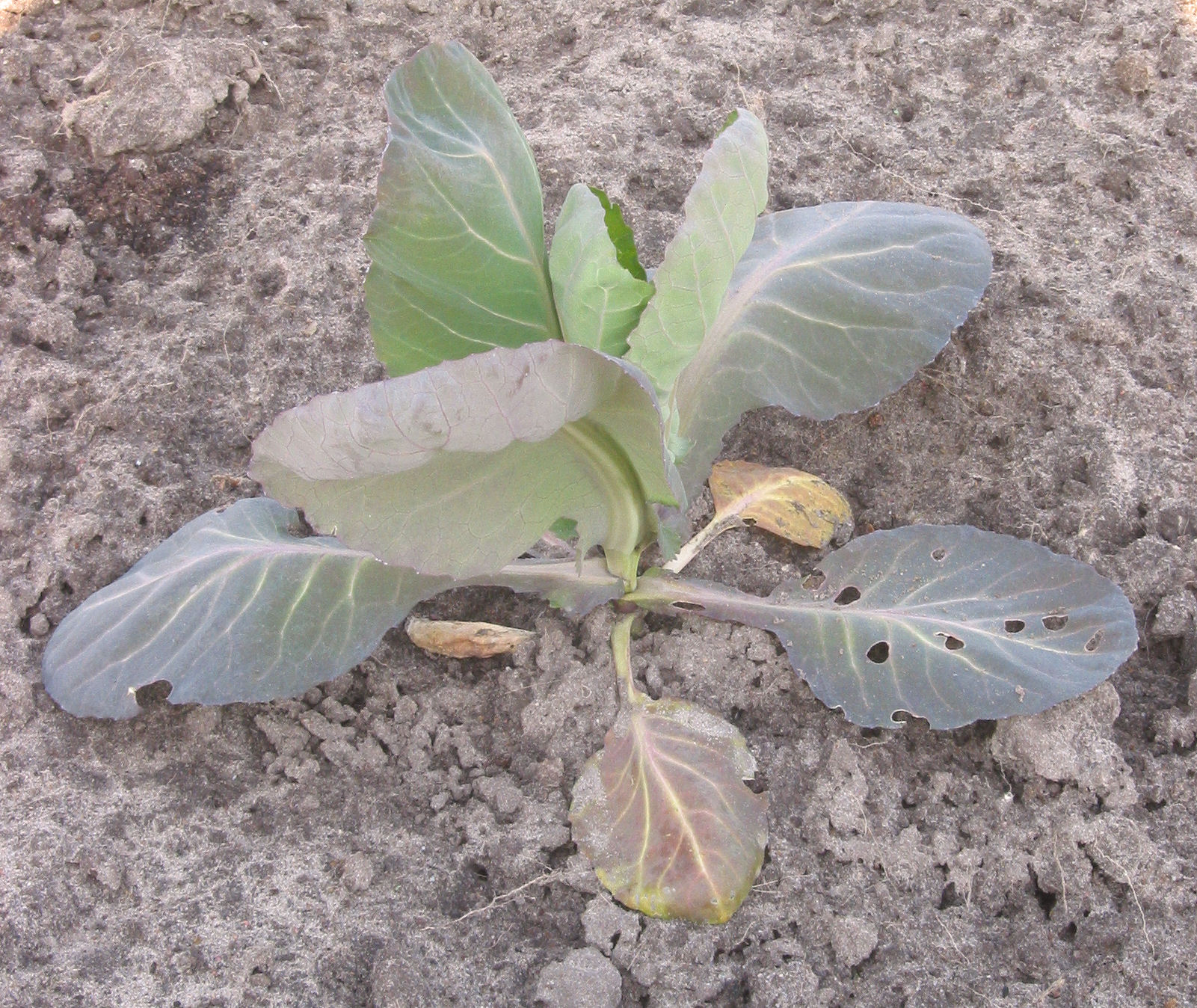
A young cabbage plant exhibiting nitrogen deficiency.

Nitrogen deficiency is a medical condition where a plant is unable to obtain enough nitrogen from the soil. This can lead to stunting, lack of flowering or fruiting, and chlorosis (a lack of chlorophyll, leading to discoloration). This can occur when organic matter with high carbon content, such as sawdust, is added to soil. Soil organisms use any nitrogen available to break down carbon sources, making nitrogen unavailable to plants. This is known as "robbing" the soil of nitrogen. All vegetables apart from nitrogen-fixing legumes are prone to this disorder.

Nitrogen deficiency can be prevented by using grass mowings as a mulch or foliar feeding with manure. Sowing green manure crops such as grazing rye to cover soil over the winter will help to prevent nitrogen leaching, while leguminous green manures such as winter tares will fix additional nitrogen from the atmosphere.

Moreover, poor irrigation system in the field can lead to loss of nitrogen in plants as stagnant water in the field will cause the nitrogen to evaporate in the air.

== Symptoms ==
Symptoms of nitrogen deficiency can include:

1. A loss of chlorophyll content in the plant's leaves, usually leading to a pale yellow color (chlorosis). Older leaves turn completely yellow.
2. Flowering, fruitings, protein and starch contents are reduced. Reduction in protein results in stunted growth and dormant lateral buds.
3. Plants become thin and pale, a condition called general starvation.

=== Effect on Potato Production ===
Symptoms of nitrogen deficiencies in plants is general chlorosis of the leaves, which is when leaves turn pale green and cup upwards severely in deficient plants. Nitrogen deficiencies also cause leaves to remain small and drop prematurely, resulting in less photosynthesis occurring in the plant. In addition, fewer and smaller tubers can form for harvest. There is a direct correlation between tuber size and yield and the amount of plant-available nitrogen in the soil. This makes it crucial that fields have enough nitrogen in the soil to grow prosperous crops. However, excess nitrogen in the soil can also be harmful to potato production, influencing how well the roots are able to develop, and delays can occur in tuber initiation during the tuberization stage of potato growth.

== Detection ==
The visual symptoms of nitrogen deficiency make it relatively easy to detect in some plant species. Symptoms include poor plant growth, and leaves become pale green or yellow because they are unable to make sufficient chlorophyll. Leaves in this state are said to be chlorotic. Lower leaves (older leaves) show symptoms first, since the plant will move nitrogen from older tissues to more important younger ones. Nevertheless, plants are reported to show nitrogen deficiency symptoms at different parts. For example, Nitrogen deficiency of tea is identified by retarded shoot growth and yellowing of younger leaves.

However, these physical symptoms can also be caused by numerous other stresses, such as deficiencies in other nutrients, toxicity, herbicide injury, disease, insect damage or environmental conditions. Therefore, nitrogen deficiency is most reliably detected by conducting quantitative tests in addition to assessing the plant's visual symptoms. These tests include soil tests and plant tissue test.

Plant tissue tests destructively sample the plant of interest. However, nitrogen deficiency can also be detected non-destructively by measuring chlorophyll content.

Chlorophyll content tests work because leaf nitrogen content and chlorophyll concentration are closely linked, which would be expected since the majority of leaf nitrogen is contained in chlorophyll molecules. Chlorophyll content can be detected with a Chlorophyll content meter; a portable instrument that measures the greenness of leaves to estimate their relative chlorophyll concentration.

Chlorophyll content can also be assessed with a chlorophyll fluorometer, which measures a chlorophyll fluorescence ratio to identify phenolic compounds that are produced in higher quantities when nitrogen is limited. These instruments can therefore be used to non-destructively test for nitrogen deficiency.

== Corrective measures ==
Fertilizers like ammonium phosphate, calcium ammonium nitrate, and urea can be supplied. Foliar spray of urea is a quick method.

== See also ==
- Nitrogen fixation
- Protein deficiency
