= Multiplex (sensor) =

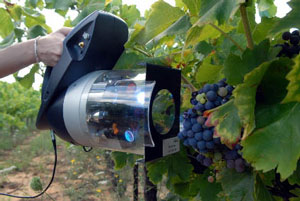
Multiplex is a sensor applied for ecophysiologic research

Multiplex sensor is a hand-held multiparametric optical sensor developed by Force-A. The sensor is a result of 15 years of research on plant autofluorescence conducted by the CNRS (National Center for Scientific Research) and University of Paris-Sud Orsay. It provides accurate and complete information on the physiological state of the crop, allowing real-time and non-destructive measurements of chlorophyll and polyphenols contents in leaves and fruits.

== Technology ==
Multiplex assesses the chlorophyll and polyphenols indices by making use of two attributes of plant fluorescence: the effect of fluorescence re-absorption by chlorophyll and screening effect of polyphenols. The sensor is an optical head which contains:

- Optical sources (UV, blue, green and red)
- Detectors (blue-green or yellow, red and far-red (NIR))

== Applications ==
Alongside with other data, Multiplex is designed to provide input for decision support systems (DSS) for a range of crops, including:

- Fertilization applications
- Crop quality assessments (nitrogen status, maturity, freshness and disease detection)

As a standalone sensor, Multiplex is a tool for rapid collection of information concerning chlorophyll and flavonoids contents of the plant to be applied on ecophysiological research.

== See also ==
- Fluorometer
- Chlorophyll fluorescence
