= Breeding for heat stress tolerance =

Plant breeding is process of development of new cultivars. Plant breeding involves development of varieties for different environmental conditions – some of them are not favorable. Among them, heat stress is one of such factor that reduces the production and quality significantly. So breeding against heat is a very important criterion for breeding for current as well as future environments produced by global climate change (e.g. global warming).

== Breeding for heat stress tolerance in plants ==
Heat stress due to increased temperature is a very important problem globally. Occasional or prolonged high temperatures cause different morpho-anatomical, physiological and biochemical changes in plants. The ultimate effect is on plant growth as well as development and reduced yield and quality. Breeding for heat stress tolerance can be mitigated by breeding plant varieties that have improved levels of thermo-tolerance using different conventional or advanced genetic tools. Marker assisted selection techniques for breeding are highly useful. Recently 41 polymorphic SSR markers has been identified between a heat tolerant rice variety 'N22' and heat susceptible-high yielding variety 'Uma' for the development of new 'high yielding-heat tolerant' rice varieties.

== What is heat stress tolerance ==
Heat stress is defined as increased temperature level sufficient to cause irreversible damage to plant growth and development. Generally a temperature rise, above usually 10 to 15 °C above ambient, can be considered heat shock or heat stress. Heat tolerance is broadly defined as the ability of the plant tolerate heat – means that grow and produce economic yield under high temperatures.

== Significance: current and future - global warming ==
Heat stress is a serious threat to crop production globally (Hall, 2001, 1992). Global warming is particularly consequence of increased level of green house gases such as CO_{2}, methane, chlorofluorocarbons and nitrous oxides. The Intergovernmental Panel on Climatic Change (IPCC) has predicted a rise of 0.3 °C per decade (Jones et al., 1999) reaching to approximately 1 and 3 °C above the present value by 2025 and 2100 AD, respectively.

== Physiological consequence of heat stress ==
At very high temperatures cause severe cellular injury and cell death may occur within short time, thus leading to a catastrophic collapse of cellular organization (Schoffl et al., 1999). However, under moderately high temperatures, the injury can only occur after longer exposure to such a temperature however the plant efficiency can be severely affected. High temperature directly affect injuries such as protein denaturation and aggregation, and increased fluidity of membrane lipids. Other indirect or slower heat injuries involve inactivation of enzymes in chloroplast and mitochondria, protein degradation, inhibition of protein synthesis, and loss of membrane integrity. Heat stress associated injuries ultimately lead to starvation, inhibition of growth, reduced ion flux, production of toxic compounds and production of reactive oxygen species (ROS). Immediately after exposure to high temperature stress-related proteins are expressed as stress defense strategy of the cell. Expression of heat shock proteins (HSPs), protein with 10 to 200 kDa, is supposed to be involved in signal transduction during heat stress. In many species it has been demonstrated that HSPs results in improved physiological phenomena such as photosynthesis, assimilate partitioning, water and nutrient use efficiency, and membrane stability.

Studies have found tremendous variation within and between species, thus this will help to breed heat tolerance for future environment. Some of attempts to develop heat-tolerant genotypes are successful. (Ehlers and Hall, 1998; Camejo et al., 2005)

== Traits associated with heat stress tolerance ==
Different physiological mechanisms may contribute to heat tolerance in the field—for example, heat tolerant metabolism as indicated by higher photosynthetic rates, stay-green, and membrane thermo-stability, or heat avoidance as indicated by canopy temperature depression. Several physiological and morphological traits have been evaluated for heat tolerance - Canopy temperature, leaf chlorophyll, stay green, leaf conductance, spike number, biomass, and flowering date.

(a) Canopy temperature depression (CTD)

CTD has shown clear association with yield in warm environments shows it association with heat stress tolerance. CTD shows high genetic correlation with yield and high values of proportion of direct response to selection (Reynolds et al., 1998) indicating that the trait is heritable and therefore amenable to early generation selection. Since an integrated CTD value can be measured almost instantaneously on scores of plants in a small breeding plot (thus reducing error normally associated with traits measured on individual plants), work has been conducted to evaluate its potential as an indirect selection criterion for genetic gains in yield. CTD is affected by many physiological factors, which makes it a powerful.

(b) Stomatal conductance

Canopy temperature depression is highly suitable for selecting physiologically superior lines in warm, low relative humidity environments where high evaporative demand leads to leaf cooling of up to 10 °C below ambient temperatures. This permits differences among genotypes to be detected relatively easily using infrared thermometry. However, such differences cannot be detected in high relative humidity environments because the effect of evaporative cooling of leaves is negligible. Nonetheless, leaves maintain their stomata open to permit the uptake of CO_{2}, and differences in the rate of CO_{2} fixation may lead to differences in leaf conductance that can be measured using a porometer. Porometry can be used to screen individual plants. The heritability of stomatal conductance is reasonably high, with reported values typically in the range of 0.5 to 0.8. Plants can be assessed for leaf conductance using a viscous flow porometer that is available on the market (Thermoline and CSIRO, Australia). This instrument can give a relative measure of stomatal conductance in a few seconds, making it possible to identify physiologically superior genotypes from within bulks.

(C) Root traits and rhizospheric pH mediated heat tolerance

Roots play an important role in plant adaptation to heat stress by regulating water and nutrient uptake, root growth and overall plant development. Recent research by Lale et al. (2026) demonstrated that rhizospheric pH regulates root growth under heat stress in Arabidopsis thaliana through reactive oxygen species (ROS) signalling. Moderate heat-induced alkalisation promotes root growth through superoxide accumulation, whereas higher temperatures cause rhizospheric acidification and hydrogen peroxide accumulation, inhibiting root growth. The study further identified plasma membrane H⁺-ATPases and the protein kinases TOT3 and TOI5 as regulators of this process. These findings highlight rhizospheric pH regulation and ROS homeostasis as potential targets for improving root thermotolerance and developing heat-resilient crops, although their relevance to crop breeding requires further investigation.

(D) Membrane thermostability

Although resistance to high temperatures involves several complex tolerance and avoidance mechanisms, the membrane is thought to be a site of primary physiological injury by heat, and measurement of solute leakage from tissue can be used to estimate damage to membranes. Since membrane thermostability is reasonably heritable (Fokar et al., 1998) and shows high genetic correlation with yield.

(E) Chlorophyll fluorescence

Chlorophyll fluorescence serves as a highly sensitive, non-destructive indicator of how absorbed light energy is distributed within the photosynthetic apparatus. Absorbed photon energy within a leaf follows three competing pathways: driving photochemical reactions (photosynthesis), dissipating harmlessly as heat (non-photochemical quenching), or being re-emitted as red-shifted light (fluorescence). Because these three processes exist in a strict competitive balance, heat stress that damages the photosynthetic mechanism will trigger a measurable shift in fluorescence kinetics.

Elevated thermal environments primarily target the light-harvesting complex of Photosystem II (PSII), disrupting the oxygen-evolving complex and inducing the physical dissociation of the thylakoid membranes. To diagnose the severity of heat-induced photoinhibition, dark-adapted leaves are tested using Pulse-Amplitude-Modulation (PAM) fluorometry to calculate the maximum quantum efficiency of PSII chemistry, expressed by the ratio:

$$\frac{F_v}{F_m} = \frac{F_m - F_o}{F_m}$$

where $F_o$ represents minimal dark-adapted fluorescence and $F_m$ represents maximal fluorescence induced by a brief saturating light pulse.

While healthy leaves maintain a highly stable, optimal $F_v/F_m$ baseline value of approximately 0.83, severe heat stress causes a pronounced decline in this ratio alongside a distinct increase in basal fluorescence ($F_o$), signaling structural damage to the core proteins of the PSII reaction center. Tracking the real-time fluctuations of this maximum quantum yield is highly effective for crop phenotyping, enabling researchers to accurately screen for heat-tolerant genotypes and monitor their post-stress functional recovery in high-temperature field conditions.

(F) Chlorophyll content and stay green

Chlorophyll content and stay green traits have been found to be associated with heat stress tolerance. Xu et al. (2000) identified three QTLs for chlorophyll content (Chl1, Chl2, and Chl3) (coincided with three stay-green QTL regions (Stg1, Stg2, and Stg3)) were identified in Sorghum. The Stg1 and Stg2 regions also contain the genes for key photosynthetic enzymes, heat shock proteins, and an abscisic acid (ABA) responsive gene.

(G) Photosynthesis

A decline in photosynthesis has been suggested as a measure of heat stress sensitivity in plants. High temperature can reduce photosynthetic carbon assimilation through both stomatal and non-stomatal limitations. Stomatal closure can restrict carbon dioxide diffusion into leaves, while non-stomatal effects include reduced Rubisco activity, inhibition of photosynthetic electron transport, disruption of thylakoid membrane stability, and increased photorespiration. These effects can lower biomass accumulation and yield, especially when heat stress occurs during sensitive growth stages.

Heat-tolerant genotypes often maintain higher photosynthetic rates, better photosystem II efficiency, more stable chlorophyll content, and faster recovery after stress. For this reason, photosynthetic traits, including gas-exchange parameters, chlorophyll content, canopy temperature, and chlorophyll fluorescence, are used in physiological screening and breeding programs for heat stress tolerance.

(H) Water-use efficiency (WUE)

Water-use efficiency is a physiological trait associated with the balance between carbon gain and water loss. Under heat stress, higher temperature can increase transpiration demand and alter stomatal regulation, which may reduce water-use efficiency and affect biomass production. In crop breeding, water-use efficiency and related traits such as stomatal conductance, canopy temperature, and photosynthetic rate are used to evaluate genotypic differences in heat and drought adaptation.

In rice, experimental studies have examined differences in water-use efficiency among varieties under elevated temperature conditions. A study of the rice varieties Ciherang, Jatiluhur, IR64, and Way Apo Buru reported that increased air temperature affected growth and water-use-related traits, indicating that water-use efficiency can be used to compare varietal responses to high-temperature stress.

(I) Stem reserve remobilization

Stem reserve remobilization refers to the movement of previously stored assimilates, especially water-soluble carbohydrates, from vegetative tissues such as stems to developing grains. In cereals, these reserves can contribute to grain filling when current photosynthesis is reduced by heat, drought, disease, or other post-anthesis stresses.

Under heat stress, high temperature can accelerate leaf senescence and reduce photosynthetic carbon assimilation, increasing the importance of stored stem reserves as an alternative carbon source for grain growth. Genotypes with greater capacity to accumulate and remobilize stem reserves may therefore maintain better grain filling and yield stability under terminal heat stress. Stem reserve remobilization is considered a useful physiological trait in breeding programs for heat-stress tolerance, particularly in cereals such as wheat.

== Combination breeding and physiological breeding ==
The physiological-trait-based breeding approach has merit over breeding for yield per se because it increases the probability of crosses resulting in additive gene action. The concept of combination phenomics comes from the idea that two or more stress have common physiological effect or common traits - which is an indicator of overall plant health. Similar analogy in human medical terms is high blood pressure or high body temperature or high white blood cells in body is an indicator of health problems and thus we can select healthy people from unhealthy using such a measure. As both abiotic and abiotic stresses can result in similar physiological consequence, tolerant plant can be separated from sensitive plants. Some imaging or infrared measuring techniques can help to speed the process for breeding process. For example, spot blotch intensity and canopy temperature depression can be monitored with canopy temperature depression.

== See also ==
- Upland rice
- Molecular breeding
- Breeding for drought stress tolerance
