= Plant tissue test =

The nutrient content of a plant can be assessed by testing a sample of tissue from that plant. These tests are important in agriculture since fertilizer application can be fine-tuned if the plants nutrient status is known. Nitrogen most commonly limits plant growth and is the most managed nutrient.

== Most useful times ==
Tissue tests are almost always useful, since they provide additional information about the physiology of the crop. Tissue tests are especially useful in certain situations;

- For monitoring the nitrogen status of a crop throughout the growing season. Soil tests are commonly performed before planting.
- In highly controlled environments, such as hydroponic production in greenhouses, crops require a constant feed of nutrients in their water supply. Even a transient lack of nutrients can reduce yields. Soil testing results cannot reveal actual nutrient uptake and nutrient mobility. Soil tests may be insufficient to manage crop nitrogen status. Soil testing may be more suitable when growing crops in slow-release composts and manures.
- When there is a risk that a nutrient application blocks uptake or unlocks mobility of other nutrients. In over application this can lead to toxic conditions, such as during the application of poultry litter that contains micro nutrients such as copper in high concentrations.
- To guarantee that nitrogen levels in the crop do not exceed a certain limit. High concentrations of nitrates has implications to human health because nitrates can be converted into nitrites in the human digestive tract. Nitrites can react with other compounds in the gut to form nitrosamines, which appear to be carcinogenic. Crops may contain high concentrations of nitrate when excess fertilizer is applied. This can be an issue in crops with high levels of nitrate uptake, such as spinach and lettuce.

== Disadvantages of traditional tests ==
Traditional tissue tests are destructive tests where a sample is sent to a laboratory for analysis. Any laboratory test (soil or tissue test) performed by a commercial company will cost the grower a fee. Laboratory tests take at least a week to complete, usually 2 weeks. It takes time to dry the samples, send them to the lab, complete the lab-tests, and then return the results to the grower. This means the results may not be received by the grower until after the ideal time to take action. Nitrogen tissue tests that can be performed quickly in the field make tissue testing much more useful.

Another issue with laboratory tissue tests is that the results are often difficult to interpret.

== Non-destructive tissue tests ==
Non-destructive tissue tests have advantages over traditional destructive tests. Non-destructive tissue tests can be performed easily in the field, and provide results much faster than laboratory tests.

To non-destructively assess nitrogen content, one can assess the chlorophyll content. Nitrogen content is linked to chlorophyll content because a molecule of chlorophyll contains four nitrogen atoms.

=== Chlorophyll content meters ===
Nitrogen deficiency can be detected with a chlorophyll content meter. The meters determine chlorophyll content by shining a light through a leaf inserted in a slot and measuring the amount of light transmitted.

Chlorophyll meters use different units of measure. For instance, while Minolta uses "SPAD units", the Dualex (produced by METOS® from Pessl Instruments GmbH) uses μg/cm² and ADC uses a Chlorophyll Content Index. All measure essentially the same thing, and conversion tables are available.

While traditional absorption instruments have been very popular with plant scientists and have proved to work well with broad leaf species, they do have limitations. Limitations of absorption meters:

- The sample must completely cover the measuring aperture. Any gaps will give false readings
- The sample measured must be thin, so measuring light is not completely absorbed
- The surface of the sample must be flat
- The Kautsky induction effect limits repeated measurements at the same site.
- Variation in measurements can be caused by mid ribs and veins
- Linear correlation limited to below 300 mg/m^{2}.

There are therefore samples which are not suitable for the absorption technique, these include small leaves, most CAM plants, conifer needles, fruit, algae on rocks, bryophytes, lichens and plant structures like stems and petioles. For these samples it is necessary to measure chlorophyll content using chlorophyll fluorescence.
In his scientific paper Gitelson (1999) states, "The ratio between chlorophyll fluorescence, at 735 nm and the wavelength range 700nm to 710 nm, F735/F700 was found to be linearly proportional to the chlorophyll content (with determination coefficient, r2, more than 0.95) and thus this ratio can be used as a precise indicator of chlorophyll content in plant leaves." The fluorescent ratio chlorophyll content meters use this technique to measure these more difficult samples.

Fluorescent ratio chlorophyll content meters have the following advantages:

- They can measure small samples because the measuring aperture does not need to be filled
- Measurements as high as 675 mg/m^{2} possible (only 300 mg/m^{2} with absorption technique)
- Curved surfaces such as pine needles and petioles can be measured
- Thick samples such as fruit and cacti can be measured
- Multiple measurements can be made at the same site because there is no Kautsky effect
- More consistent readings because leaf veins and mid ribs can be avoided

By measuring chlorophyll fluorescence, plant ecophysiology can be investigated. Chlorophyll fluorometers are used by plant researchers to assess plant stress.

=== Chlorophyll fluorometry ===
Chlorophyll fluorometers are designed to measure variable fluorescence of photosystem II, or PSII. With most types of plant stress, this variable fluorescence can be used to measure the level of plant stress. The most commonly used protocols include: Fv/Fm, a dark adapted protocol, Y(II) or ΔF/Fm’ a light adapted test that is used during steady state photosynthesis, and various OJIP, dark adapted protocols that follow different schools of thought. Longer fluorescence quenching protocols can also be used for plant stress measurement, but because the time required for a measurement is extremely long, only small plant populations can probably be tested. NPQ or non-photochemical quenching is the most popular of these quenching parameters, but other parameters and other quenching protocols are also used.

Another test protocol based on fluorescence is the OJIP test. This method analyses the increase in fluorescence emitted from dark-adapted leaves when they are illuminated. The rise in fluorescence during the first second of illumination follows a curve with intermediate peaks, called the O, J, I, and P steps. In addition, the K step appears during specific types of stress, such as N-deficiency. Research has shown the K step is able to measure N-stress.

== See also ==
- Soil test
- Fertilizer
- Fertility (soil)
- Nitrogen deficiency
