= SNRK =

Protein-coding gene in the species Homo sapiens

Identifiers
- Aliases: SNRK, HSNFRK, SNF related kinase
- External IDs: OMIM: 612760; MGI: 108104; GeneCards: SNRK
Enzyme activity
EC #	BRENDA	ExPASy	KEGG	MetaCyc
2.7.11.1	↗	↗	↗	↗

Gene location (Human)
Chr.	Chromosome 3 (human)
Band	3p22.1	Start	43,286,512 bp
Band	3p22.1	End	43,424,764 bp

Gene location (Mouse)
Chr.	Chromosome 9 (mouse)
Band	9|9 F4	Start	121,946,332 bp
Band	9|9 F4	End	121,998,768 bp
RNA expression pattern
Bgee	Human / Mouse (ortholog); Top expressed in: pericardium; visceral pleura; skin of hip; lower lobe of lung; cerebellar vermis; buccal mucosa cell; parietal pleura; superficial temporal artery; vena cava; urethra / Top expressed in: cerebellar vermis; lobe of cerebellum; left lung lobe; superior cervical ganglion; brown adipose tissue; granulocyte; neural layer of retina; interventricular septum; subcutaneous adipose tissue; pontine nuclei; More reference expression data
BioGPS	n/a
Gene ontology
Molecular function	transferase activity; nucleotide binding; protein kinase activity; protein serine/threonine kinase activity; ATP binding; magnesium ion binding; metal ion binding; kinase activity
Cellular component	cytoplasm; nucleus
Biological process	protein phosphorylation; myeloid cell differentiation; intracellular signal transduction; phosphorylation
Sources:Amigo / QuickGO
Orthologs
Databases	NCBI: entry; OMA: entry
Species	Human	Mouse
Entrez	54861	20623
Ensembl	ENSG00000163788	ENSMUSG00000038145
UniProt	Q9NRH2	Q8VDU5
RefSeq (mRNA)	NM_001100594; NM_017719; NM_001330750	NM_001164572; NM_133741; NM_001357774; NM_001357775; NM_001357776
RefSeq (protein)	NP_001094064; NP_001317679; NP_060189	NP_001158044; NP_598502; NP_001344703; NP_001344704; NP_001344705
Location (UCSC)	Chr 3: 43.29 – 43.42 Mb	Chr 9: 121.95 – 122 Mb
PubMed search
- Wikidata
View/Edit Human	View/Edit Mouse

SNF-related serine/threonine-protein kinase is an enzyme that in humans is encoded by the SNRK gene.
