= Mehler reaction =

The Mehler reaction is named after Alan H. Mehler, who, in 1951, presented data to the effect that isolated chloroplasts reduce oxygen to form hydrogen peroxide (H_{2}O_{2}). Mehler observed that the H_{2}O_{2} formed in this way does not present an active intermediate in photosynthesis; rather, as a reactive oxygen species, it can be toxic to surrounding biological processes as an oxidizing agent. In scientific literature, the Mehler reaction often is used interchangeably with the Water-Water Cycle to refer to the formation of H_{2}O_{2} by photosynthesis. Sensu stricto, the Water Water Cycle encompasses the Hill reaction, in which water is split to form oxygen, as well as the Mehler Reaction, in which oxygen is reduced to form H_{2}O_{2} and, finally, the scavenging of this H_{2}O_{2} by antioxidants to form water.

Beginning in the 1970s, Professor Kozi Asada elucidated that oxygen can be reduced by electrons emerging from ferredoxin of photosystem I, to form superoxide, which is then reduced by superoxide dismutase to form H_{2}O_{2}. This photochemical H_{2}O_{2} is then reduced by the action of ascorbate peroxidase to form water and oxidized ascorbate. Asada argued that oxygen presents an important sink for excess excitation energy acquired during plant exposure to bright light. He would often begin seminars by asking: 'Why aren't plants sunburnt despite being exposed to light?'.

How much of a photoprotective role the Water Water Cycle plays has been occasion for some debate. In terrestrial plants, transfer of electrons to oxygen from ferredoxin at PSI accounts for easily less than 10% of total photosynthetic electron transport. In algae and other uni-cellular photosynthetic organisms, however, this amount can account for 20 to 30% of total electron transport. It is possible that the reduction of oxygen by free electrons emerging from PSI prevents components of the electron transport chain from becoming over-reduced.

The Water Water Cycle is not related to photorespiration, as it comprises different reactions and results in no net oxygen consumption.
