= Breeding for drought stress tolerance =

"Practice of breeding plants against drought-induced impacts"

Breeding for drought resistance is the process of breeding plants with the goal of reducing the impact of dehydration on plant growth.

== Dehydration stress ==
=== Crop plants ===
In nature or crop fields, water is often the most limiting factor for plant growth. If plants do not receive adequate rainfall or irrigation, the resulting dehydration stress can reduce growth more than all other environmental stresses combined.

Drought can be defined as the absence of rainfall or irrigation for a period of time sufficient to deplete soil moisture and cause dehydration in plant tissues. Dehydration stress results when water loss from the plant exceeds the ability of the plant's roots to absorb water and when the plant's water content is reduced enough to interfere with normal plant processes.

=== Global phenomenon ===
About 15 million km2 of the land surface is covered by crop-land, and about 16% of this area is equipped for irrigation (Siebert et al. 2005). Thus, in many parts of the world, including the United States, plants may frequently encounter dehydration stress. Rainfall is very seasonal and periodic drought occurs regularly. The effect of drought is more prominent in sandy soils with low water holding capacity. On such soils some plants may experience dehydration stress after only a few days without water.

During the 20th century, the rate of increase in `blue' water withdrawal (from rivers, lakes, and aquifers) for irrigation and other purposes was higher than the growth rate of the world population (Shiklomanov 1998). Country-wise maps of irrigated areas are available.

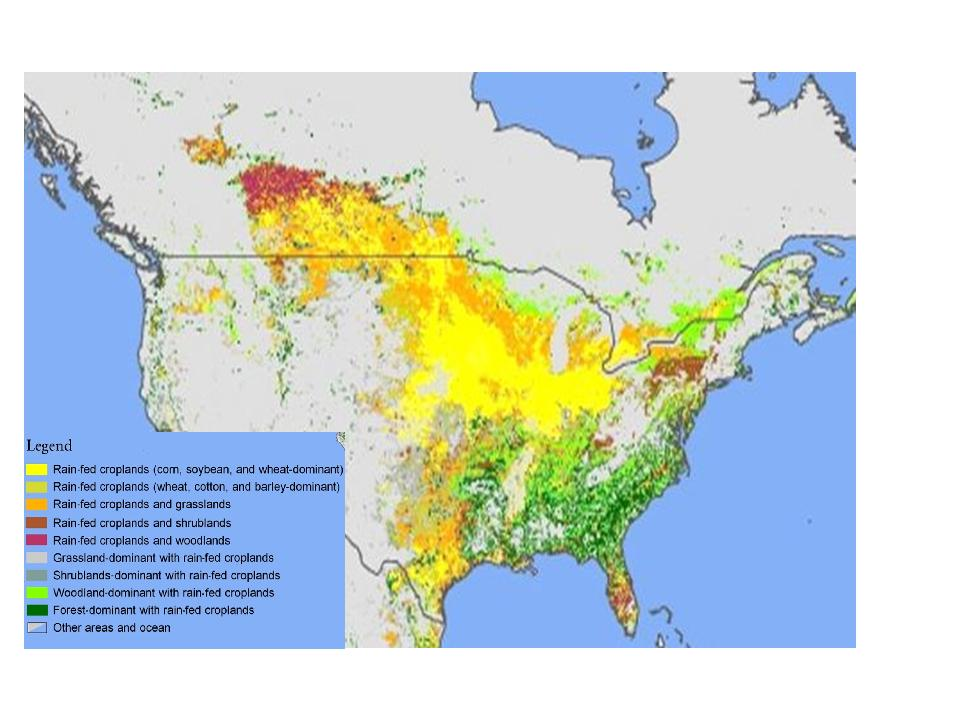
Rain fed areas of USA, for details - Biradar et al. (2009) International J Applied Earth Observation and Geoinformation 11: 114–129

=== Future challenges to crop production ===
Soil moisture deficit is a significant challenge to the future of crop production. Severe drought in parts of the U.S., Australia, and Africa in recent years drastically reduced crop yields and disrupted regional economies. Even in average years, however, many agricultural regions, including the U.S. Great Plains, suffer from chronic soil moisture deficits. Cereal crops typically attain only about 25% of their potential yield due to the effects of environmental stress, with dehydration stress the most important cause. Two major trends will likely increase the frequency and severity of soil moisture deficits:

- Climate change: Higher temperatures are likely to increase crop water use due to increased transpiration. A warmer atmosphere will also speed up melting of mountain snow pack, resulting in less water available for irrigation. More extreme weather patterns will increase the frequency of drought in some regions.
- Limited water supplies: Increased demand from municipal and industrial users will further reduce the amount of water available for irrigated crops.

Although changes in tillage and irrigation practices can improve production by conserving water, enhancing the genetic tolerance of crops to drought stress is considered an essential strategy for addressing moisture deficits.

=== Plant physiology ===
A plant responds to a lack of water by halting growth and reducing photosynthesis and other plant processes in order to reduce water use. As water loss progresses, leaves of some species may appear to change colour — usually to blue-green. Foliage begins to wilt and, if the plant is not irrigated, leaves will fall off and the plant will eventually die. Soil moisture deficit lowers the water potential of a plant's root and, upon extended exposure, abscisic acid is accumulated and eventually stomatal closure occurs. This reduces a plant's leaf relative water content.

The time required for dehydration stress to occur depends on the water-holding capacity of the soil, environmental conditions, stage of plant growth, and plant species. Plants growing in sandy soils with low water-holding capacity are more susceptible to dehydration stress than plants growing in clay soils. A limited root system will accelerate the rate at which dehydration stress develops. A plant's root system may be limited by the presence of competing root systems from neighbouring plants, by site conditions such as compacted soils or high water tables, or by container size (if growing in a container). A plant with a large mass of leaves in relation to the root system is prone to drought stress as the leaves may lose water faster than the roots can supply it. Newly planted plants and poorly established plants may be especially susceptible to dehydration stress because of the limited root system or the large mass of stems and leaves in comparison to roots.

Drought stress also affects photosynthetic physiology through both stomatal and non-stomatal limitations. Stomatal closure reduces carbon dioxide diffusion into leaves, which can lower carbon assimilation and alter the balance between photochemistry, heat dissipation, and excess light energy. Physiological measurements such as relative water content, stomatal conductance, chlorophyll content, gas exchange, and chlorophyll fluorescence are therefore used to evaluate how drought affects photosynthetic performance and stress recovery in crop plants.

=== Other stress factors ===
Aside from the moisture content of the soil, environmental conditions of high light intensity, high temperature, low relative humidity and high wind speed will significantly increase plant water loss. The prior environment of a plant also can influence the development of dehydration stress. A plant that has been exposed to dehydration stress (hardened) previously and has recovered may become more drought resistant. Also, a plant that was well-watered prior to being water-limited will usually survive a period of drought better than a continuously dehydration-stressed plant.

== Mechanisms of Drought Resistance ==
The degree of resistance to drought depends upon individual crops. Generally three strategies can help a crop to mitigate the effect of dehydration stress:

The Drought Resistance terms in summary (Levitt, J. (1980); Blum, A. (2011))

=== Avoidance ===
If the plant shows dehydration avoidance, the environmental factor is excluded from the plant tissues by reducing water loss ("water savers", e.g. by thick leaf epicuticular wax, leaf rolling, leaf posture) or maintaining water uptake ("water spenders", e.g. by growing deeper roots). Dehydration avoidance is desirable in modern agriculture, where drought resistance requires the maintenance of economically viable plant production under dehydration stress. The role of dehydration avoidance is maintaining water supply and sustaining leaf hydration and turgidity with the purpose of maintaining stomatal opening and transpiration as long as possible under water deficit. This is essential for leaf gas exchange, photosynthesis and plant production through carbon assimilation.

=== Tolerance ===
If the plant shows dehydration tolerance, the environmental factor enters the plant tissues but the tissues survive, by e.g. maintaining turgor and osmotic adjustment.

=== Escape ===
Dehydration escape involves e.g. early maturing or seed dormancy, where the plant uses previous optimal conditions to develop vigor. Dehydration recovery refers to some plant species being able to recuperate after brief drought periods.

A proper timing of life-cycle, resulting in the completion of the most sensitive developmental stages while water is abundant, is considered to be a dehydration escape strategy. Avoiding dehydration stress with a root system capable of extracting water from deep soil layers, or by reducing evapotranspiration without affecting yields, is considered as dehydration avoidance. Mechanisms such as osmotic adjustment (OA) whereby a plant maintains cell turgor pressure under reduced soil water potential are categorised as dehydration tolerance mechanisms. Dehydration avoidance mechanisms can be expressed even in the absence of stress and are then considered constitutive. Dehydration tolerance mechanisms are the result of a response triggered by dehydration stress itself and are therefore considered adaptive. When the stress is terminal and predictable, dehydration escape through the use of shorter duration varieties is often the preferable method of improving yield potential. Dehydration avoidance and tolerance mechanisms are required in situations where the timing of drought is mostly unpredictable.

Drought resistance mechanisms are genetically controlled and genes or QTL responsible for drought resistance have been discovered in several crops which opens avenue for molecular breeding for drought resistance.

== Drought resistance traits ==
Resistance to drought is a quantitative trait, with a complex phenotype, often confounded by plant phenology. Breeding for drought resistance is further complicated since several types of abiotic stress, such as high temperatures, high irradiance, and nutrient toxicities or deficiencies can challenge crop plants simultaneously.

=== Osmotic adjustment ===
When a plant is exposed to water deficit, it may accumulate a variety of osmotically active compounds such as amino acids and sugars, resulting in a lowering of the osmotic potential. Examples of amino acids that may be up-regulated are proline and glycine betaine. This is termed osmotic adjustment and enables the plant to take up water, maintain turgor and survive longer.

=== Cell membrane stability ===
The ability to survive dehydration is influenced by a cell's ability to survive at reduced water content. This can be considered complementary to OA because both traits will help maintain leaf growth (or prevent leaf death) during water deficit. Crop varieties differ in dehydration tolerance and an important factor for such differences is the capacity of the cell membrane to prevent electrolyte leakage at decreasing water content, or “cell membrane stability (CMS)”. The maintenance of membrane function is assumed to mean that cell activity is also maintained. Measurements of CMS have been used in different crops and are known to be correlated with yields under high temperature and possibly under dehydration stress.

=== Chlorophyll fluorescence ===
Chlorophyll fluorescence has been used as a non-destructive physiological trait for screening drought responses in crop plants. Drought can reduce photosynthetic performance through stomatal closure, reduced carbon assimilation, and impaired photosystem II activity. Fluorescence-derived parameters, including $F_v/F_m$ and the effective quantum yield of photosystem II, can help detect changes in photochemical efficiency before visible symptoms of stress become apparent.

=== Epicuticular wax ===
In sorghum (Sorghum bicolor L. Moench), drought resistance is a trait that is highly correlated with the thickness of the epicuticular wax layer. Experiments have demonstrated that rice varieties with a thick cuticle layer retain their leaf turgor for longer periods of time after the onset of a water-stress.

=== Partitioning and stem reserve mobilisation ===
As photosynthesis becomes inhibited by dehydration, the grain filling process becomes increasingly reliant on stem reserve utilisation. Numerous studies have reported that stem reserve mobilisation capacity is related to yield under dehydration stress in wheat. In rice, a few studies also indicated that this mechanism maintains grain yield under dehydration stress at the grain filling stage. This dehydration tolerance mechanism is stimulated by a decrease in gibberellic acid concentration and an increase in abscisic acid concentration.

=== Seedling drought resistance traits ===
For emergence from deep sowing (to exploit dry upper soil), this is practised to help seedlings reach the receding moisture profile, and to avoid high soil surface temperatures which inhibit germination. Screening at these stage provides practical advantages, specially when managing large amount of germ-plasms.

== The Drought Resistant Ideotype ==
Usually ideotypes are developed to create an ideal plant variety. The following traits constitutes ideotype of wheat by International Maize and Wheat Improvement Center (CIMMYT).

- Large seed size. Helps emergence, early ground cover and initial biomass.
- Long coleoptiles. For emergence from deep sowing
- Early ground cover.

Thinner, wider leaves (i.e., with a relatively low specific leaf weight) and a more prostrate growth habit help to increase ground cover, thus conserving soil moisture and potentially increasing radiation use efficiency.

- High pre-anthesis biomass.
- Good capacity for stem reserves and remobilisation
- High spike photosynthetic capacity
- High relative leaf water content (RLWC), stomatal conductance (Gs), and/or canopy temperature depression (CTD) during grain filling to indicate ability to extract water
- Osmotic adjustment
- Accumulation of abscisic acid (ABA).

The benefit of ABA accumulation under dehydration has been demonstrated (Innes et al. 1984). It appears to pre-adapt plants to stress by reducing stomatal conductance, rates of cell division, organ size, and increasing development rate. However, high ABA can also result in sterility since high ABA levels may abort developing florets

- Heat Tolerance: The contribution of heat tolerance to performance under dehydration stress needs to be quantified, but it is relatively easy to screen for (Reynolds et al. 1998).
- Leaf anatomy: Waxiness, pubescence, rolling, thickness, posture. These traits decrease radiation load to the leaf surface. Benefits include a lower evapotranspiration rate and reduced risk of irreversible photo-inhibition. However, they may also be associated with reduce radiation use efficiency, which would reduce yield under more favourable conditions.
- High tiller survival: Comparison of old and new varieties have shown that under dehydration older varieties over-produce tillers many of which fail to set grain while modern drought resistant lines produce fewer tillers most of which survive.
- Stay-green: The trait may indicate the presence of drought resistance mechanisms, but probably does not contribute to yield per se if there is no water left in the soil profile by the end of the cycle to support leaf gas exchange. It may be detrimental if it indicates lack of ability to remobilise stem reserves. However, research in sorghum has indicated that Stay-green is associated with higher leaf chlorophyll content at all stages of development and both were associated with improved yield and transpiration efficiency under dehydration.

== Combination phenomics: overall health of crops ==
The concept of combination phenomics comes from the idea that two or more plant stresses have common physiological effects or common traits - which are an indicator of overall plant health. As both biotic and abiotic stresses can result in similar physiological consequence, drought resistant plants can be separated from sensitive plants. Some imaging or infrared measuring techniques can help to speed the process for breeding process. For example, spot blotch intensity and canopy temperature depression can be monitored with canopy temperature depression.

In addition to canopy temperature and chlorophyll content, chlorophyll fluorescence measurements can provide rapid, non-destructive indicators of photosystem II performance under drought and combined stress conditions.

== Molecular breeding for drought resistance ==
Recent research breakthroughs in biotechnology have revived interest in targeted drought resistance breeding and use of new genomics tools to enhance crop water productivity. Marker-assisted breeding is revolutionising the improvement of temperate field crops and will have similar impacts on breeding of tropical crops. Other molecular breeding tool include development of genetically modified crops that can tolerate plant stress. As a complement to the recent rapid progress in genomics, a better understanding of physiological mechanisms of dehydration response will also contribute to the progress of genetic enhancement of crop drought resistance. It is now well accepted that the complexity of the dehydration syndrome can only be tackled with a holistic approach that integrates physiological dissection of crop dehydration avoidance and - tolerance traits using molecular genetic tools such as marker-assisted selection (MAS), micro-arrays and transgenic crops, with agronomic practices that lead to better conservation and utilisation of soil moisture, and better matching of crop genotypes with the environment. MAS has been implemented in rice varieties to assess the drought tolerance and to develop new abiotic stress-tolerant varieties

== See also ==
- Upland rice
- Molecular breeding
